= Go Go Juice (song) =

2025 song by Sabrina Carpenter

Song by Sabrina Carpenter

from the album Man's Best Friend
- Released: August 29, 2025
- Genre: Country-pop
- Length: 3:13
- Label: Island
- Songwriters: Carpenter; Amy Allen; Jack Antonoff; John Ryan
- Producers: Carpenter; Antonoff; Ryan

Lyric video
- "Go Go Juice" on YouTube

"Go Go Juice" is a song written and recorded by the American singer-songwriter Sabrina Carpenter, for her seventh studio album, Man's Best Friend (2025). Produced by Carpenter, Jack Antonoff and John Ryan, "Go Go Juice" is a banjo-driven country-pop track, incorporating fiddles, twangs and drums. Lyrically, the track deals with coping with heartbreak through parties and alcohol, using the "go go juice" as a metaphor for temporary confidence and healing.

Music critics mostly praised the song's production. "Go Go Juice" peaked at number 24 on the Billboard Hot 100 and number 19 on the Billboard Global 200. It also peaked in the charts of Australia, the United Kingdom, Ireland, and Portugal.

== Composition ==
"Go Go Juice" is a country-pop song, driven by banjo, violin, and guitar. The song features fiddles and twangs. Paste Magazine journalist Matt Mitchell compared the production to the styles of American country singer-songwriter Dolly Parton. Lyrically, "Go Go Juice" explores dealing with heartbreak through partying and drinking alcohol. Carpenter also references her ex-boyfriends in the song through pseudonyms: Canadian singer-songwriter Shawn Mendes, Irish actor Barry Keoghan and American singer and actor Joshua Bassett (Could be John or Larry / Gosh, who's to say?). Some speculate that the line (Or the one that rhymes with "villain") either refers to American actors Dylan O'Brien or Griffin Gluck.

== Release and reception ==
"Go Go Juice" was released as the ninth track of Carpenter's seventh studio album, Man's Best Friend. Upon release, the song was praised for its production and lyrics. In a ranking of all the tracks of Man's Best Friend, Jason Lipshutz of Billboard ranked "Go Go Juice" in seventh place, praising its upbeat energy and production – highlighting its instrumental breakdown and the influence of Bleachers, a band led by co-producer Jack Antonoff. Similarly, Nicole Fell of The Hollywood Reporter described the song as one of the album's most enjoyable tracks due to its country-pop elements and Carpenter's "cheeky reference to exes", placing it in number 9 out of 12 songs. Vishakha Punjabi of Elle dubbed "Go Go Juice" as the "jewel of the album", describing it as "a group therapy session disguised as a party chant". Jazlyn Gonzales of The State Press compared the track to Carpenter's other songs, namely "Nobody's Son", "When Did You Get Hot?" and "House Tour", commending them as "invigorating danceable songs" with "interesting production" and "being conversational and in on the joke".

== Commercial performance ==
"Go Go Juice" peaked at number 24 on the Billboard Hot 100 for the United States and charted at number 19 on the Billboard Global 200. It also peaked at number 22 in the national charts of Australia and Portugal, number 15 in the United Kingdom and number 18 in Ireland.

== Live performances ==
Carpenter performed "Go Go Juice" the first time on October 26, 2025, in New York City at the Short n' Sweet Tour. She sang it again in Nashville, Tennessee on November 4, 2025, and on November 19, 2025, in Los Angeles. The song was performed as part of her headlining set at Coachella 2026, with reference to "Cell Block Tango" number from the musical Chicago.

== Credits and personnel ==
Credits are adapted from Tidal.

Musicians

- Sabrina Carpenter – vocals, background vocals; banjo
- Jack Antonoff – percussion, programming, synthesizer, electric guitar, keyboards, glockenspiel, 12-string acoustic guitar, mandolin, slide guitar, background vocals
- Amy Allen – background vocals, percussion
- Michael Riddleberger – percussion
- Sean Hutchinson – percussion
- Bobby Hawk – violin
- John Ryan – bass, electric guitar, keyboards, percussion, programming, background vocals, slide guitar
- Mikey Freedom Hart – slide guitar
- Evan Smith – tenor saxophone, baritone saxophone, flute
- Zem Audu – tenor saxophone
- Tatum Greenblatt – trumpet

Technical

- Serban Ghenea – mixing
- John Ryan – engineering, recording
- Ruairí O'Flaherty – mastering
- Bryce Bordone – engineering
- Jack Antonoff – engineering, recording
- Oli Jacobs – engineering, recording
- Laura Sisk – engineering, recording
- Jeff Gunnell – engineering, recording
- Mikey Freedom Hart – recording
- David Hart – recording
- Michael Riddleberger – recording
- Sean Hutchinson – recording
- Evan Smith – recording
- Zem Audu – recording
- Jack Manning – recording assistance
- Joey Miller – recording assistance
- Lorenzo Wolff – additional engineering
- Kellie McGrew – recording assistance

== Certifications ==
Certifications for "Go Go Juice"
Region	Certification	Certified units/sales
Brazil (Pro-Música Brasil)	Platinum	40,000^{‡}
^{‡} Sales+streaming figures based on certification alone.
