= Coachella 2026 =

Music festival in California, U.S.

- Promotional lineup poster
- Date: April 10–19, 2026
- Locations: Empire Polo Club, Indio, California, United States
- Previous event: Coachella 2025
- Next event: Coachella 2027
- Website: coachella.com

Coachella 2026 was a music and arts festival that took place at the Empire Polo Club, in Indio, California, from April 10 to 19, 2026. It was the 25th edition of the festival. The scheduled headlining performers were Sabrina Carpenter, Justin Bieber, Karol G, and Anyma. It sold out within a week of its announcement.

== Background ==
The Coachella Valley Music and Arts Festival, sometimes referred to as "Coachella Festival" or simply "Coachella," is held annually at the Empire Polo Club in Indio, California, United States. It was co-founded by Paul Tollett and Rick Van Santen in 1999, and is organized by Goldenvoice, a subsidiary of AEG Presents. The event features musical artists from many genres of music, including rock, pop, indie, hip hop, latin, and electronic dance music, as well as art installations and sculptures. Most of the performances are streamed live on YouTube, with some sets broadcast on a delayed basis.

== Lineup ==
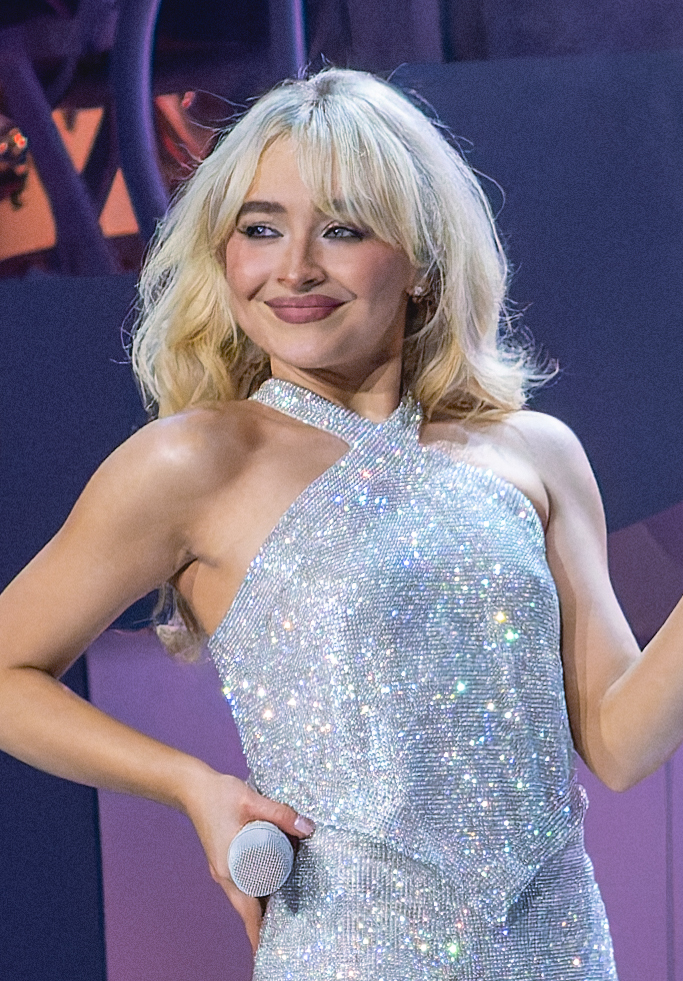
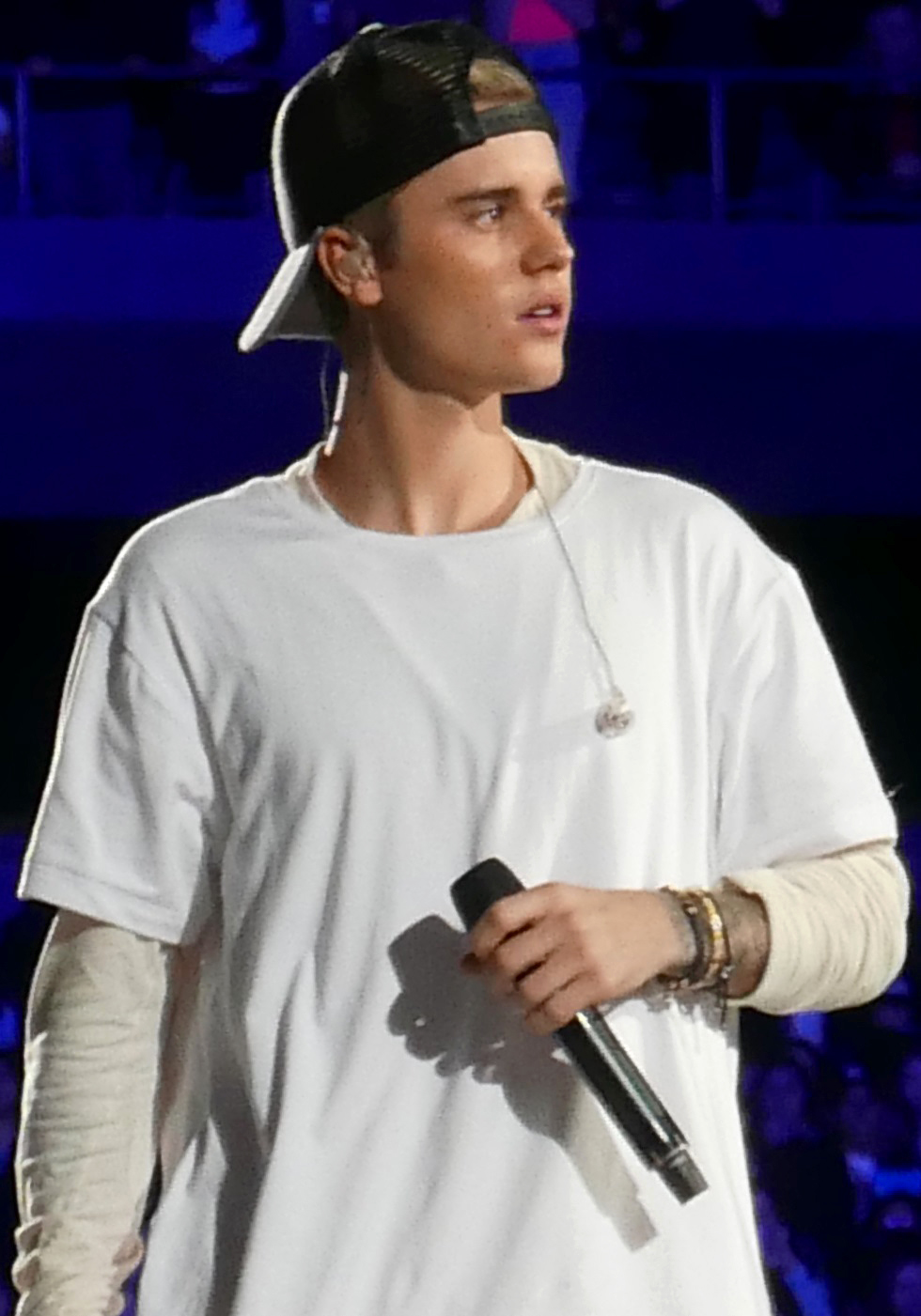
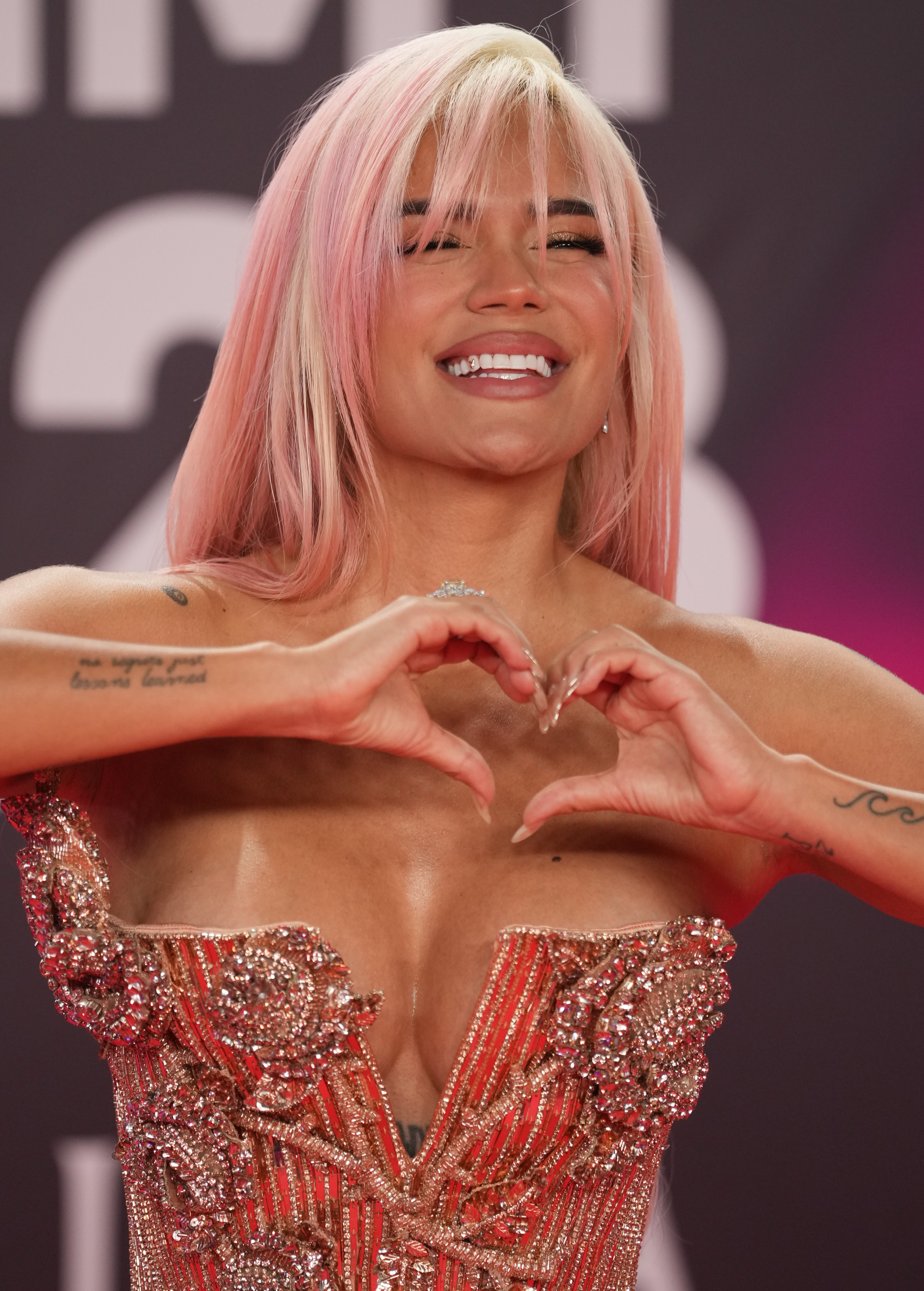
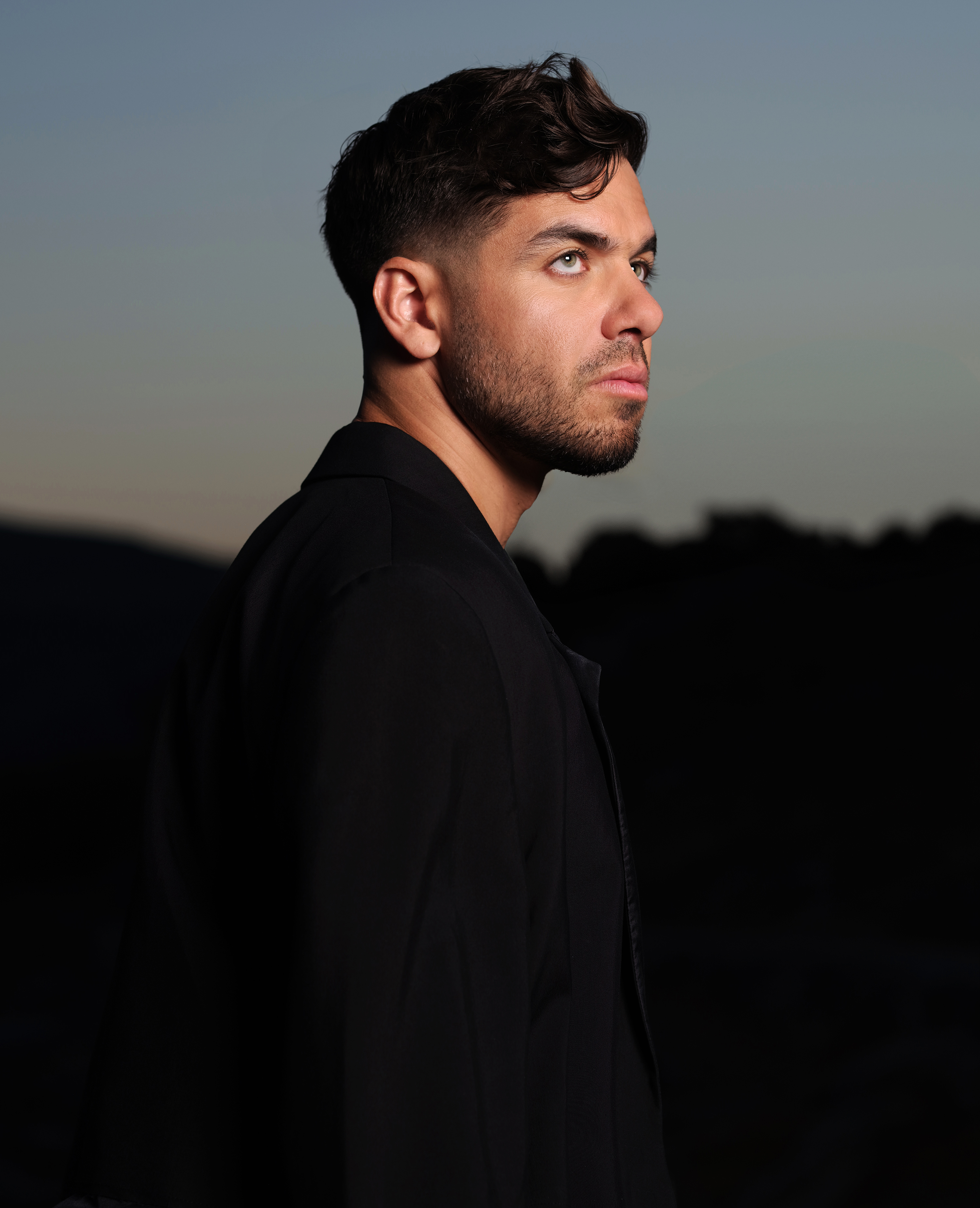
Coachella 2026 headliners (from left to right, top to bottom): Sabrina Carpenter, Justin Bieber, Karol G and Anyma

The lineup for the 2026 edition of the festival was announced on September 15, 2025, with Sabrina Carpenter, Justin Bieber, Karol G, and Anyma as headliners. Karol G is the first Latina artist to headline Coachella. First-time performers include the girl group Katseye, Bini – becoming the first Filipino group to perform at Coachella, and Noga Erez – becoming the first Israeli singer to perform at the festival. Nine Inch Nails and Boys Noize performed as one act called Nine Inch Noize. English artist FKA Twigs performed at the festival after being unable to participate in the 2025 festival.

=== Coachella Stage ===
| Friday (April 10 & 17) | Saturday (April 11 & 18) | Sunday (April 12 & 19) |
|---|---|---|
| Sabrina Carpenter^{[A]}; Anyma^{[B]}; The xx; Teddy Swims^{[C]}; Record Safari | Justin Bieber^{[D]}; The Strokes; Giveon^{[E]}; Addison Rae^{[F]}; Jaqck Glam | Karol G^{[G]}; Young Thug^{[H]}; Major Lazer^{[I]}; Wet Leg^{[J]}; Tijuana Panthers; Gabe Real |

A. Sabrina Carpenter's set featured guest appearances from Will Ferrell, Susan Sarandon, Samuel L. Jackson, Sam Elliot, and Corey Fogelmanis on the first weekend, and Geena Davis, Terry Crews, Madonna, and Fogelmanis on the second weekend.
B. Anyma's set on the first weekend was canceled following severe weather conditions at the festival grounds, later performing a surprise set with Marlon Hoffstadt at the Do Lab to close out the first weekend. On the second weekend, his set featured guest appearances from Lisa, Joji, Matt Bellamy, and Swae Lee.
C. Teddy Swims' set featured guest appearances from Joe Jonas, Vanessa Carlton, and David Lee Roth on the first weekend.
D. Justin Bieber's set featured guest appearances from The Kid Laroi, Dijon, Tems, Wizkid, and Mk.gee on the first weekend, and Sexyy Red, Billie Eilish, Big Sean, Dijon, and SZA on the second weekend.
E. Giveon's set featured a guest appearance from Kehlani on the first weekend and Snoop Dogg on the second weekend.
F. Addison Rae's set featured a guest appearance from Maddie Ziegler on the first weekend, and Olivia Rodrigo and Ziegler on the second weekend.
G. Karol G's set featured guest appearances from Mariah Angeliq, Becky G, Wisin, and Greg Gonzalez on the first weekend, and Peso Pluma, Becky G, J Balvin, and Ryan Castro on the second weekend.
H. Young Thug's set featured guest appearances from Nav, Camila Cabello and Ty Dolla Sign on the first weekend, and Mariah the Scientist on the second weekend.
I. Major Lazer's set featured a guest appearance from M.I.A. on the first weekend.
J. Wet Leg's set featured a guest appearance from HorsegiirL on the first weekend.

==== Headline sets ====
Sabrina Carpenter
1. "House Tour"
2. "Taste"
3. "Busy Woman"
4. "Manchild"
5. "When Did You Get Hot?"
6. "Please Please Please"
7. "We Almost Broke Up Again Last Night"
8. "Nobody's Son"
9. "Because I Liked a Boy"
10. "My Man on Willpower"
11. "Go Go Juice"
12. "Such a Funny Way"
13. "Sugar Talking"
14. "Don't Smile"
15. "Feather"
16. "Bed Chem"
17. "Juno"
18. "Espresso"
19. "Goodbye"
20. "Tears"
During Carpenter's set on the second weekend, "Juno" was shortened to just the first half; after which Madonna duetted with Carpenter on "Vogue", "Bring Your Love" (then unreleased), and "Like a Prayer".
Justin Bieber
1. "All I Can Take"
2. "Speed Demon"
3. "First Place"
4. "Go Baby"
5. "Butterflies"
6. "Walking Away"
7. "All the Way" / "405" / "Too Long" / "Petting Zoo" / "I Do"
8. "Stay" (with the Kid Laroi)
9. "Things You Do"
10. "Glory Voice Memo"
11. "Zuma House"
12. "Dotted Line"
13. "Everything Hallelujah"
14. "Baby"
15. "Favorite Girl"
16. "That Should Be Me"
17. "Beauty and a Beat"
18. "Never Say Never"
19. "Confident"
20. "All That Matters"
21. "With You"
22. "So Sick"
23. "Sorry"
24. "Where Are Ü Now"
25. "I'm the One"
26. "Yukon"
27. "Devotion" (with Dijon)
28. "I Think You're Special" (with Tems)
29. "Essence" (with Wizkid and Tems)
30. "Daisies" (with Mk.gee)

During Bieber's set on the second weekend:

- "Sweet Spot" with Red was performed succeeding "I Do" and "Mother in You" was performed in place of "Stay".
- "One Time", "U Smile" and "Up" were performed preceding "Baby".
- Succeeding "Baby", "One Less Lonely Girl" with an appearance by Billie Eilish, "As Long as You Love Me" and "No Pressure" with Big Sean, and a cover of Justin Timberlake's "Cry Me a River" were performed.
- "Snooze" with SZA was performed in place of "I Think You're Special" and "Essence".
Karol G
1. "Latina Foreva"
2. "Un Gatito Me Llamó"
3. "Oki Doki"
4. "Tá OK" (remix)
5. "El Makinón" (with Mariah Angeliq)
6. "S91"
7. "Tropicoqueta"
8. "Papasito"
9. "El Son de la Negra"
10. "Ese Hombre Es Malo"
11. "Mamiii" (with Becky G)
12. "A Su Boca La Amo (interlude)"
13. "Gatúbela"
14. Después de Ti (with Greg Gonzalez)
15. "Bandida Entrenada"
16. "Ojos Ferrari"
17. "Pam Pam" (with Wisin)
18. "Mayor Que Yo" (with Wisin)
19. "Rakata" (with Wisin)
20. "Ivonny Bonita"
21. "TQG"
22. "Amargura"
23. "Tusa"
24. "Mi Tierra"
25. "Si Antes Te Hubiera Conocido"
26. "Provenza (remix)"

During Karol's set on the second weekend:

- "Qlona" with Pluma was performed in place of "El Makinón".
- "El Barco" was performed in place of "Después de Ti".
- Balvin performed "Ay Vamos", "Ginza", and "La Canción" in place of the tracks performed by Wisin during weekend one.
- "Bichota" was performed following "Tusa" and preceding "Mi Tierra".
Anyma
1. "Æden"
2. "Ritual"
3. "Atoma"
4. "Savior"
5. "Carrier of Souls" (with Matt Bellamy)
6. "Turn On the Lights Again..."
7. "Phenomenal" (with Swae Lee)
8. "Girls MIA" / "m.A.A.d city"
9. "Prophecy"
10. "No Good (Start the Dance)"
11. "Lo siento"
12. "Eternity"
13. "Hypnotized"
14. "Voices In My Head" / "Appetite"
15. "Bad Angel" (with Lisa)
16. "Syren"
17. "Run"
18. "Transcend"
19. "Beautiful" (with Joji)

=== Outdoor Theatre ===
| Friday | Saturday | Sunday |
|---|---|---|
| Disclosure; Turnstile; Dijon; Lykke Li; Dabeull; Tiffany Tyson | David Byrne; Labrinth; Sombr^{[A]}; Alex G; Los Hermanos Flores; Blondshell | BigBang; Laufey; Foster the People; Clipse^{[B]}; Gigi Perez^{[C]}; Juicewon |

A. Sombr's set featured a guest appearance from Billy Corgan during the first weekend and Billy Idol, Steve Stevens, and Quenlin Blackwell during the second weekend.
B. Clipse's set featured a guest appearance from Travis Barker during the first weekend.
C. Gigi Perez's set featured guest appearances from her sister Bella Perez and Noah Cyrus during the first weekend, and Hayley Kiyoko during the second weekend.

=== Sonora Tent ===
| Friday | Saturday | Sunday |
|---|---|---|
| Not for Radio; Hot Mulligan; Cachiruja & Loojan; Ninajirachi^{[A]}; The Two Lips; Fleshwater; Wednesday; Carolina Durante; February; Doom Dave | Mind Enterprises; 54 Ultra; Rusowsky; Ceremony; Ecca Vandal; Freak Slug; Die Spitz; Triste Juventud | French Police; Drain; RØZ^{[B]}; Los Retros; Jane Remover; Model/Actriz; Glitterer; Panda and Chom |

A. Ninajirachi's set featured a guest appearance from Porter Robinson on the first weekend.
B. RØZ's set featured a guest appearance from Rauw Alejandro on the first weekend.

=== Gobi Tent ===
| Friday | Saturday | Sunday |
|---|---|---|
| Creepy Nuts; Joost Klein^{[A]}; Holly Humberstone; Fakemink; CMAT; Joyce Manor; NewDad; Bob Baker Marionettes; Cahuilla Bird Singers and Dancers | Morat; Bia^{[B]}; Davido; Geese; Luísa Sonza; Whatmore; Noga Erez | The Rapture; Tomora; Black Flag; Oklou^{[C]}; Cobrah; The Chats; Flowerovlove^{[D]} |

A. Joost Klein's set featured a guest appearance from Käärijä on the second weekend.
B. Bia's set featured guest appearances from Natalie Nunn, OhGeesy, DDG, and 310babii on the first weekend.
C. Oklou's set featured a guest appearance from Underscores on the first weekend.
D. Flowerovlove's set featured a guest appearance from Bini on the first weekend, and Niana Guerrero on the second weekend.

=== Mojave Tent ===
| Friday | Saturday | Sunday |
|---|---|---|
| Blood Orange; Ethel Cain; Moby^{[A]}; Devo; Central Cee; Bini; Slayyyter; Novasoul | Interpol; PinkPantheress^{[B]}; Taemin; Royel Otis; Fujii Kaze; Jack White/Kacey Musgraves^{[C]} | FKA Twigs; Iggy Pop; Suicidal Tendencies^{[D]}; Little Simz; Samia; wydeflower |

A. Moby's set featured a guest appearance from Jacob Lusk on the first weekend.
B. PinkPantheress' set featured guest appearances from Tyriq Withers and Thundercat on the first weekend, and Manon Bannerman, Chase Infiniti, Zara Larsson, Janelle Monáe, Ninajirachi, Blood Orange, Slayyyter, Megan Stalter, and Withers on the second weekend.
C. Jack White performed during the first weekend, while Kacey Musgraves is scheduled to perform on the second.
D. Suicidal Tendencies' set featured a guest appearance from Thundercat on the first weekend.

=== Sahara Tent ===
| Friday | Saturday | Sunday |
|---|---|---|
| Sexyy Red^{[A]}; Swae Lee^{[B]}; Levity^{[C]}; Katseye^{[D]}; Marlon Hoffstadt; Hugel^{[E]}; Youna; Massio | Worship; Adriatique; Rezz; Nine Inch Noize; Yousuke Yukimatsu; Hamdi; Zulan; TEED; Seek-One | Kaskade; Subtronics^{[F]}; Mochakk; Duke Dumont; Bunt.; Girl Math; Loboman |

A. Sexyy Red's set featured a guest appearance from Lizzo on the first weekend.
B. Swae Lee's set featured guest appearances from Jhené Aiko and Nav on the first weekend, and a Rae Sremmurd reunion on the second weekend with a guest appearance from Slim Jxmmi.
C. Levity's set featured a guest appearance from Big Sean on the first weekend.
D. Katseye's set featured guest appearances from Huntrix (Ejae, Audrey Nuna, and Rei Ami) on the first weekend.
E. Hugel's set featured guest appearances from Snoop Dogg and Big Sean on the first weekend, and French Montana, Ty Dolla Sign, and Murda Beatz on the second weekend.
F. Subtronics's set featured a guest appearance from Destroy Lonely on the first weekend.

=== Yuma Tent ===
| Friday | Saturday | Sunday |
|---|---|---|
| Gordo; Max Styler; Max Dean and Luke Dean; Prospa; Kettama; Rossi and Chloé Caillet; Groove Armada; Arodes; Jessica Branka; Sahar Z | Armin van Buuren and Adam Beyer; Boys Noize; Bedouin; Sosa; Ben Sterling; Mahmut Orhan; Riordan; Genesi; Yamagucci | Green Velvet and Ayybo; WhoMadeWho; Röyksopp; Carlita and Josh Baker; Mëstiza; &friends; Azzeca; Le Yora |

=== Quasar Stage ===
| Friday | Saturday | Sunday |
|---|---|---|
| PAWSA; Deep Dish; Tiga | First weekend: David Guetta^{[A]}; Afrojack and Shimza; Joezi; Second weekend: DJ Snake and Knock2; DJ Snake, RL Grime and Flosstradamus; Madeon; Devault | Fatboy Slim; Joy Anonymous; Jazzy |

A. David Guetta's set featured a guest appearance from Jennifer Lopez.

== Notable events ==
=== The Strokes anti-war protest ===
On April 18, 2026, while performing Oblivius, American rock band The Strokes staged an anti-war protest against the United States and Israel during their Coachella performance.

The performance criticized U.S. interventions in the Middle East, including the Iran War and Gaza war. Visuals displayed during the performance criticized the Central Intelligence Agency's role in enforcing regime change through violence, and denounced U.S. and Israeli military actions in Iran and Gaza.

== Reception ==
The music festival sold out in less than a week after its announcement, with both VIP and general admission tickets quickly claimed. Any further ticket availability is being managed through an official waitlist system.

Gabriel Saulog of Billboard Philippines praised the Filipino girl group Bini for their week 1 performance, describing it as a showcase of Filipino talent on a global stage. He also highlighted the group choreography, vocals, and their stage presence with its positive reception among international audiences. Their debut was the most trending topic worldwide in social media. Althea Legaspi and Maya Rego of Rolling Stone also praised the performance, saying that Bini had long envisioned a Coachella debut and cited it as a dream they hoped to achieve and they have now realized that goal.
