= Go Go Juice =

Go Go Juice may refer to:

- "Go Go Juice", a song by Sabrina Carpenter from Man's Best Friend
- Go Go Juice, an album by Jon Cleary (musician)
- Go-go juice, citizens band radio slang for fuel
