= House Tour =

Single by Sabrina Carpenter

from the album Man's Best Friend
- B-side: "Back Door" (Fcukers remix)
- Released: April 17, 2026
- Genre: Bubblegum pop; dance-pop; power pop; synth-pop
- Length: 2:49
- Label: Island
- Songwriters: Sabrina Carpenter; Amy Allen; Jack Antonoff; John Ryan
- Producers: Sabrina Carpenter; Jack Antonoff; John Ryan

Sabrina Carpenter singles chronology
| "When Did You Get Hot?" (2026) | "House Tour" (2026) | "Bring Your Love" (2026) |

Music video
- "House Tour" on YouTube

"House Tour" is a song by American singer Sabrina Carpenter and the fourth single from her seventh studio album, Man's Best Friend (2025). It was written by Carpenter with Amy Allen, Jack Antonoff, and John Ryan, and was produced by Carpenter, Antonoff, and Ryan. A music video directed by Carpenter and Margaret Qualley was released on April 6, 2026. Carpenter performed the song on her fifth concert tour, the Short n' Sweet Tour (2024–2025).

A bubblegum pop, dance-pop, power pop, and synth-pop song, "House Tour" incorporates elements of post-disco and 1980s pop. Its lyrics use various innuendos about taking a date back to Carpenter's house. The song received positive reviews from music critics, who drew comparisons to the work of Janet Jackson and Paula Abdul. Its music video won Best Editing at the 2026 MTV Video Music Awards.

== Composition and lyrics ==
"House Tour" incorporates bubblegum pop, dance-pop, power pop, and synth-pop with a post-disco beat and elements of 1980s music. It has received comparisons to Janet Jackson and Paula Abdul. The lyrics of "House Tour" are filled with innuendos and are about the singer showing her date her house, while also being about sex. Carpenter references the cookie brand Chips Ahoy! in its lyrics. However, Carpenter contradicts the innuendos in the song's lyrics when she sings "and I promise none of this is a metaphor" in reference to "coming inside".

== Release ==
The song was first released as the penultimate track on Carpenter's seventh album, Man's Best Friend (2025). The song was sent to radio stations as the album's fourth single on April 17, 2026, following "Tears". A 7-inch vinyl of the song, with a Fcukers remix titled "Back Door" on the B-side, was released on June 26.

A music video for "House Tour" was filmed in the Disco Volante Estate at 1851 Stanley Avenue in Los Angeles, California in March 2026 and released on April 6, 2026. Co-directed by Carpenter and Margaret Qualley and shot in VistaVision, it depicts Carpenter, Qualley, and Madelyn Cline as a trio of thieves called the Pretty Girl Clean-up Crew, who break into the mansion, dance around, play with the owner's pet spider and pet dog, and loot the mansion's contents. The trio leave the empty mansion as the police arrive, running over a man in the process and leaving behind the pet spider and a playful note on the mattress in the mansion's bedroom, thanking the owner for their stay and pledging to recommend the mansion to their friends. It drew comparisons to the lesbian crime thriller Drive-Away Dolls, which also starred Qualley.

== Live performances ==
Carpenter added the song to the 2025 North American leg setlist of the Short n' Sweet Tour. She also performed the song on several festivals in 2026, including Lollapalooza Chile, Argentina and Brazil, Asunciónico in Paraguay, and the Festival Estéreo Picnic in Bogotá, Colombia. The song was performed as the opening track of her headlining set at Coachella 2026.

== Reception ==
When ranking every song on Man's Best Friend, Jason Lipshutz placed it at number 2, calling it a "fast-moving synth-pop track rife with winks and innuendos, the song is both a thrilling gag and expertly crafted '80s workout", noting that "Carpenter moves briskly across hooks and one-liners, landing jokes about waxed floors and backdoors without detracting from the song’s pop shimmer. No other pop star could have constructed [the track] quite like Carpenter, and it sounds like a future fan favorite." India Block stated that it "is all cute Barbie's dream house until you realise she's making a floor plan sound like the Karma Sutra". At the 2026 edition of the MTV Video Music Awards, the music video won Best Editing and was nominated for Best Pop, Best Direction and Song of Summer. It received a nominated for Best Music Video at the 34th Camerimage International Cinematography Festival.

== Credits and personnel ==
Adapted from Tidal:

=== Performers ===
- Sabrina Carpenter – lead and background vocals, producer
- Jack Antonoff – 12-string acoustic guitar, acoustic guitar, banjo, bass, drums, composer, electric guitar, keyboard, engineer, lyricist, mellotron, piano, producer, recording engineer, Rhodes, synthesizer, vocal programmer
- John Ryan – bass, drums, guitar, keyboard, percussion, producer, programming, recording engineer
- Amy Allen – background vocals, composer, lyricist
- Michael Riddleberger – agogô, bells, recording engineer
- Bobby Hawk – violin

=== Technical ===
- Bryce Bordone – engineer
- Jeff Gunnell – engineer, recording engineer
- Joey Miller – second engineer
- Jozef Caldwell – second engineer
- Laura Sisk – engineer, recording engineer
- Oli Jacobs – engineer, recording engineer
- Ruairi O'Flaherty – mastering engineer
- Sean Hutchinson – recording engineer
- Serban Ghenea – mixing engineer

== Charts ==
=== Weekly charts ===
Weekly chart performance
| Chart (2025–2026) | Peak position |
|---|---|
| Argentina Anglo Airplay (Monitor Latino) | 8 |
| Australia (ARIA) | 20 |
| Bolivia Airplay (Monitor Latino) | 3 |
| Canada Hot 100 (Billboard) | 29 |
| Canada CHR/Top 40 (Billboard) | 16 |
| Central America Anglo Airplay (Monitor Latino) | 10 |
| Chile Anglo Airplay (Monitor Latino) | 15 |
| Costa Rica Anglo Airplay (Monitor Latino) | 14 |
| Croatia International Airplay (Top lista) | 20 |
| Ecuador Anglo Airplay (Monitor Latino) | 8 |
| Finland Airplay (Radiosoittolista) | 37 |
| Global 200 (Billboard) | 21 |
| Guatemala Anglo Airplay (Monitor Latino) | 8 |
| Ireland (IRMA) | 22 |
| Jamaica Airplay (JAMMS) | 8 |
| Netherlands (Single Tip) | 6 |
| New Zealand (Recorded Music NZ) | 22 |
| Nicaragua Anglo Airplay (Monitor Latino) | 4 |
| Paraguay Anglo Airplay (Monitor Latino) | 8 |
| Slovakia Airplay (ČNS IFPI) | 55 |
| Sweden (Sverigetopplistan) | 94 |
| UK Singles (Official Charts) | 17 |
| Uruguay Anglo Airplay (Monitor Latino) | 14 |
| US Billboard Hot 100 | 27 |
| US Adult Pop Airplay (Billboard) | 33 |
| US Pop Airplay (Billboard) | 10 |
| Venezuela Airplay (Record Report) | 78 |

=== Monthly charts ===
Monthly chart performance
| Chart (2026) | Peak position |
|---|---|
| Paraguay Airplay (SGP) | 37 |

== Certifications ==
Certifications
| Region | Certification | Certified units/sales |
|---|---|---|
| Australia (ARIA) | Gold | 35,000^{‡} |
| Brazil (Pro-Música Brasil) | Platinum | 40,000^{‡} |
| Canada (Music Canada) | Gold | 40,000^{‡} |
| New Zealand (RMNZ) | Gold | 15,000^{‡} |
| United Kingdom (BPI) | Gold | 400,000^{‡} |
^{‡} Sales+streaming figures based on certification alone.

== Release history ==
Release dates and formats
| Region | Date | Format | Label(s) | Ref. |
|---|---|---|---|---|
| Italy | April 17, 2026 | Radio airplay | Island | |
| United States | June 26, 2026 | 7-inch single | Island | |
