= My Man on Willpower =

2025 song by Sabrina Carpenter

Song by Sabrina Carpenter

from the album Man's Best Friend
- Released: August 29, 2025
- Genre: Eurodisco; country pop
- Length: 3:17
- Label: Island
- Songwriters: Sabrina Carpenter; Amy Allen; Jack Antonoff; John Ryan
- Producers: Antonoff; Ryan; Carpenter

Lyric video
- "My Man on Willpower on YouTube

"My Man on Willpower" is a song by American singer Sabrina Carpenter from her seventh studio album, Man's Best Friend (2025). She wrote it with Amy Allen, Jack Antonoff and John Ryan and produced it with Antonoff and Ryan.

== Composition ==
"My Man on Willpower" is a Eurodisco song that includes country elements, handclaps and an ascending progression. It has been compared to ABBA in regard to style. The song opens with "thrusting Depeche Mode synths," before introducing a pedal steel flourish. In a tongue-in-cheek, comic manner, Carpenter vents her frustration about a boyfriend who has lost his sexual desire for her, having restrained himself due to his self-actualization and being overly focused on improving himself.

== Critical reception ==
Jason Lipshutz of Billboard ranked "My Man on Willpower" as the eighth best song from Man's Best Friend, writing "Carpenter balances crooning and punchlines with aplomb, never tipping the song too much towards comedy to betray the genuine emotion at its core." Tara Hepburn of The Skinny called the song an "infectious, knowing bop." Jon Caramanica of The New York Times stated that on the song, "Carpenter's syllables feel crammed into awkward spaces." Mary Chiney of Beats Per Minute commented on the song, "its appeal is in how it doesn't try too hard, a rare pause in an album that thrives on excess."

== Live performances ==
Carpenter debuted "My Man on Willpower" live on November 10, 2025, at the Scotiabank Arena in Toronto during the "Spin the Bottle" segment of the Short n' Sweet Tour, in which she performs a surprise song selected at random. She also performed the song on a treadmill as part of her headlining set at Coachella 2026.

== Charts ==
=== Weekly charts ===
Weekly chart performance for "My Man on Willpower"
Chart (2025)	Peak position
Australia (ARIA)	15
Canada Hot 100 (Billboard)	20
France (SNEP)	192
Global 200 (Billboard)	10
Greece International (IFPI)	17
Ireland (IRMA)	9
Lithuania Airplay (TopHit)	45
Netherlands (Single Top 100)	53
New Zealand (Recorded Music NZ)	16
Philippines (Philippines Hot 100)	51
Portugal (AFP)	20
Spain (Promusicae)	91
Sweden (Sverigetopplistan)	60
UK Singles (Official Charts)	7
US Billboard Hot 100	15

=== Monthly charts ===
Monthly chart performance for "My Man on Willpower"
Chart (2025)	Peak position
Lithuania Airplay (TopHit)	80

== Certifications ==
Certifications for "My Man on Willpower"
Region	Certification	Certified units/sales
Brazil (Pro-Música Brasil)	Platinum	40,000^{‡}
^{‡} Sales+streaming figures based on certification alone.
