= Tears (Sabrina Carpenter song) =

Single by Sabrina Carpenter

from the album Man's Best Friend
- B-side: "Tears (extended dance break)"
- Released: August 29, 2025
- Genre: Disco-pop; disco-R&B; nu-disco
- Length: 2:40
- Label: Island
- Songwriters: Sabrina Carpenter; John Ryan; Amy Allen
- Producers: Sabrina Carpenter; John Ryan

Sabrina Carpenter singles chronology
"Manchild" (2025)	"Tears" (2025)	"When Did You Get Hot?" (2026)

Music video
- "Tears" on YouTube

"Tears" is a song recorded by American singer Sabrina Carpenter. It was released on August 29, 2025, by Island Records, as the second single from her seventh studio album, Man's Best Friend (2025). The song was written and produced by Carpenter and John Ryan, with additional writing from Amy Allen.

== Background and promotion ==
Following the release of the lead single "Manchild" on June 5, 2025, Carpenter began revealing song titles from her upcoming seventh studio album, Man's Best Friend, with the help of fans and social media users on July 23. On August 1, she unveiled the title of the album's second track, "Tears". The reveal was accompanied by a photo of Carpenter standing next to a puppy lying on a white chair, with the word "Tears" displayed. A week before the album's release, Carpenter announced that "Tears" would be released as the second single alongside the album on August 29. Before its official release, the song was reported to be a fan favorite at album listening parties.

== Composition ==
"Tears" is a pop, disco-pop, disco-R&B, nu-disco, and disco track with influence from Donna Summer and Baccara's "Yes Sir, I Can Boogie" (1977). Carpenter sings about being turned on by a man's polite behavior, more by his manners than his actual words. In the chorus, she makes it clear that these subtle gestures are enough to bring her to climax.

== Commercial performance ==
In the United Kingdom, "Tears" debuted at number three on the UK Singles Chart dated September 5, 2025, as the week's highest new entry. With other Man's Best Friend tracks "Manchild" and "My Man on Willpower" occupying positions in the top ten, at numbers four and seven respectively, Carpenter charted three singles in the UK top ten simultaneously for the second time in her career. The song also debuted at number three on the Billboard Hot 100 chart, making it Carpenter's fifth top 10 single, as well as debuting in the top 40 of the Billboard Adult Pop Airplay and Pop Airplay charts.

== Reception ==
"Tears" received generally favorable reviews from critics. Jason Lipshutz of Billboard ranked it as the best song from Man's Best Friend, praising the production and Carpenter's lyrics. Mary Chiney of Beats Per Minute wrote that the song had "a sweetness that feels ripped straight out of a teen-movie montage". Nick Levine of NME called "Tears" a "glistening disco swirler" and praised the lyrics' use of double entendre. Similarly, India Block of the London Standard wrote that "Carpenter’s way with double entendre needs to be studied in a lab".

Others were less positive. Mikael Wood of Los Angeles Times called the song "a pillowy disco thumper with echoes of KC and the Sunshine Band", but said that Carpenter seemed to be "reaching for a memeable lyric". Adam White of The Independent also considered the song to be too derivative of material from Short 'n Sweet.

At the 2026 MTV Video Music Awards, the music video was nominated for Video of the Year. It was also nominated for Best Pop Video – International at the 2026 UK Music Video Awards.

== Music video ==
The music video for the song was teased twice; the first, accompanying the song's announcement, promised "straight-up cinema". In it, the imagery suggested country noir—Carpenter wears a cowboy hat in a fog-covered hay field, not far from a crashed, smoldering car, and gazes toward an abandoned house. The screen then cuts to black, displaying the title "Tears" in a blood-red font, with a blood droplet in the 'A'. She captioned that teaser, "Tears video. 8/29... just one more week until Man's Best Friend!" Another teaser, released on August 27, 2025, shows Carpenter walking through a hallway with red walls, as hands with long nails reach out toward her.

The music video was released alongside the song and the album on August 29, 2025. It stars American actor Colman Domingo in drag, and is primarily inspired by the 1970s cult classic The Rocky Horror Picture Show. It was filmed over two days on August 11 and 12, 2025 in Los Angeles, California and directed by Bardia Zeinali, who had directed the video for Carpenter's song "Please Please Please" the previous year. The farmhouse exterior scenes were shot on August 12, 2025, at the Golden Oak Ranch. On September 1, 2025, shortly after the release of the video, the original ending was replaced with an alternate ending, teased on YouTube's Instagram story with the caption "New Endings Loading". The following day, on September 2, 2025, a second alternate ending was released. A third alternate ending was later released on September 3, 2025. The original ending was reinstated on September 4, 2025.

The video opens with an eerie nighttime scene. Carpenter, following a car accident with her boyfriend, wakes up dazed in a field. Hearing a creepy laugh from a nearby abandoned farmhouse, she investigates. After hearing the magic word "shikitah", she enters the front parlor and finds herself surrounded by odd artifacts and a player piano. She is enticed by Domingo, who pushes her into the backroom, filled with drag queens. Carpenter is stripped down to her white lingerie by hands coming out of the walls and is handed a "Tears" can, resembling a Coke can. She performs a pole dance in a cornfield as Domingo voyeurs from afar, has a dance break with Domingo in the back alley of a retro American city street, and joins the drag troupe to perform the burlesque finale.

At the end of the video, Carpenter is tossed out of the house, only to find her boyfriend, who has regained consciousness, coming towards her. With a puzzled look, Carpenter tells the boyfriend that she thought he had died in the accident because "someone has to die every video." She then apologizes before hurling one of her heels at him, piercing his chest and killing him. As he crumples to the ground, she gets up to leave, saying matter-of-factly, "You have to give the people what they want."

=== Alternate endings ===
There were three alternate endings for the video, taking place after the boyfriend finds Carpenter.

- As the boyfriend is almost struck by a nearby lightning bolt, he jumps, startled. Carpenter then warns him to move over to avoid a falling tree, but he does not hear her as the tree crushes him to death. Carpenter then laments to herself, "I told him to move over," and gets up to leave.
- Carpenter and the boyfriend suddenly see a nearby grand piano falling from the sky, but the boyfriend does not have time to run before the piano suddenly crushes him from above as a bewildered Carpenter stares in shock.
- In this ending, Carpenter does not see the boyfriend or his car in front of her. Hearing ghostly rustling, she calls out to the empty field, only to find no response. Concluding that the boyfriend has left without waiting for her, a disillusioned Carpenter leaves, badmouthing him as "typical, stupid, useless." Some time later, the boyfriend, wearing red lingerie, opens the door from inside the house and calls out to Carpenter, only to find that she has left. Dejected, he walks back inside and shuts the door.

== Live performances ==
Carpenter performed "Tears" live for the first time at the 2025 MTV Video Music Awards at the UBS Arena in Elmont, New York, on September 7, 2025. The performance began with Carpenter emerging from a manhole before joining her background dancers, including RuPaul's Drag Race contestants Denali, Laganja Estranja, Lexi Love, Symone and Willam, and ballroom dancer Honey Balenciaga. Some of the dancers carried signs with messages such as "Protect Trans Rights", "Support Drag", and "Love Each Other". The performance ended with Carpenter and her dancers being drenched in fake rain. Critics compared the performance to Britney Spears on her Dream Within a Dream Tour, where she also was drenched in rain during the encore.

Carpenter also performed the song at the Austin City Limits Music Festival in October 2025, and added the song to the setlist of her Short n' Sweet Tour for its final North American leg, which began on October 23, 2025, in Pittsburgh. It was the closing song of Carpenter's headliner set at Coachella 2026, where she performed it on a rising car seat atop of a fountain, wearing a black laced bodysuit and a matching newsboy cap.

== Track listing ==
- 7-inch single
1. "Tears" – 2:40
2. "Tears" (extended dance break) – 3:57

== Charts ==
=== Weekly charts ===
Weekly chart performance
Chart (2025–2026)	Peak position
Argentina Airplay (Monitor Latino)	11
Australia (ARIA)	3
Austria (Ö3 Austria Top 40)	6
Belarus Airplay (TopHit)	6
Belgium (Ultratop 50 Flanders)	21
Belgium (Ultratop 50 Wallonia)	12
Bolivia Anglo Airplay (Monitor Latino)	5
Brazil Hot 100 (Billboard)	28
Bulgaria Airplay (PROPHON)	10
Canada Hot 100 (Billboard)	4
Canada AC (Billboard)	28
Canada CHR/Top 40 (Billboard)	3
Canada Hot AC (Billboard)	17
Central America Anglo Airplay (Monitor Latino)	7
Chile Airplay (Monitor Latino)	10
Colombia Anglo Airplay (Monitor Latino)	3
CIS Airplay (TopHit)	4
Costa Rica Anglo Airplay (Monitor Latino)	6
Croatia International Airplay (Top lista)	5
Czech Republic Singles Digital (ČNS IFPI)	41
Denmark (Tracklisten)	18
Dominican Republic Anglo Airplay (Monitor Latino)	8
Ecuador Anglo Airplay (Monitor Latino)	3
Estonia Airplay (TopHit)	13
Finland (Suomen virallinen lista)	17
France (SNEP)	50
Germany (GfK)	20
Global 200 (Billboard)	2
Greece International (IFPI)	2
Guatemala Anglo Airplay (Monitor Latino)	3
Hong Kong (Billboard)	23
Iceland (Tónlistinn)	7
Ireland (IRMA)	3
Israel (Mako Hitlist)	70
Italy (FIMI)	63
Italy Airplay (EarOne)	12
Jamaica Airplay (JAMMS)	8
Japan Hot 100 (Billboard)	77
Kazakhstan Airplay (TopHit)	4
Latin America Anglo Airplay (Monitor Latino)	5
Latvia Airplay (LaIPA)	1
Latvia Streaming (LaIPA)	13
Lithuania (AGATA)	20
Lithuania Airplay (TopHit)	4
Luxembourg (Billboard)	10
Mexico Anglo Airplay (Monitor Latino)	4
Moldova Airplay (TopHit)	34
Netherlands (Dutch Top 40)	22
Netherlands (Single Top 100)	13
New Zealand (Recorded Music NZ)	5
Nicaragua Anglo Airplay (Monitor Latino)	2
Nigeria (TurnTable Top 100)	83
Norway (VG-lista)	9
Panama Anglo Airplay (Monitor Latino)	11
Paraguay Anglo Airplay (Monitor Latino)	5
Peru Anglo Airplay (Monitor Latino)	3
Philippines Hot 100 (Billboard Philippines)	18
Poland Airplay (OLiS)	25
Poland Streaming (OLiS)	29
Portugal (AFP)	3
Romania Airplay (TopHit)	136
Russia Airplay (TopHit)	5
San Marino Airplay (SMRTV Top 50)	14
Singapore (RIAS)	13
Slovakia Airplay (ČNS IFPI)	59
Slovakia Singles Digital (ČNS IFPI)	43
South Africa Airplay (TOSAC)	14
South Korea BGM (Circle)	117
South Korea Download (Circle)	142
Spain (Promusicae)	35
Sweden (Sverigetopplistan)	9
Switzerland (Schweizer Hitparade)	10
Ukraine Airplay (TopHit)	197
United Arab Emirates (IFPI)	17
UK Singles (Official Charts)	3
Uruguay Anglo Airplay (Monitor Latino)	8
US Billboard Hot 100	3
US Adult Contemporary (Billboard)	19
US Adult Pop Airplay (Billboard)	15
US Pop Airplay (Billboard)	6
Venezuela Anglo Airplay (Monitor Latino)	4

=== Monthly charts ===
Monthly chart performance
Chart (2025–2026)	Peak position
Belarus Airplay (TopHit)	11
CIS Airplay (TopHit)	5
Estonia Airplay (TopHit)	18
Kazakhstan Airplay (TopHit)	5
Lithuania Airplay (TopHit)	6
Moldova Airplay (TopHit)	50
Paraguay Airplay (SGP)	24
Russia Airplay (TopHit)	6

=== Year-end charts ===
Year-end chart performance
Chart (2025)	Position
Argentina Anglo Airplay (Monitor Latino)	14
Belgium (Ultratop 50 Flanders)	127
Belgium (Ultratop 50 Wallonia)	149
Canada CHR/Top 40 (Billboard)	97
Canada Hot AC (Billboard)	97
CIS Airplay (TopHit)	63
Estonia Airplay (TopHit)	59
Kazakhstan Airplay (TopHit)	160
Lithuania Airplay (TopHit)	72
Netherlands (Dutch Top 40)	86
Russia Airplay (TopHit)	69

== Certifications ==
Certifications
Region	Certification	Certified units/sales
Australia (ARIA)	Platinum	70,000^{‡}
Belgium (BRMA)	Gold	20,000^{‡}
Brazil (Pro-Música Brasil)	Diamond	160,000^{‡}
Canada (Music Canada)	Platinum	80,000^{‡}
France (SNEP)	Gold	100,000^{‡}
New Zealand (RMNZ)	Platinum	30,000^{‡}
Portugal (AFP)	Gold	12,000^{‡}
Spain (Promusicae)	Gold	50,000^{‡}
United Kingdom (BPI)	Platinum	600,000^{‡}
United States (RIAA)	Gold	500,000^{‡}
^{‡} Sales+streaming figures based on certification alone.

== Release history ==
Release dates and formats
Region	Date	Format	Label(s)	Ref.
United States	September 2, 2025	Contemporary hit radio	Island; Republic	
Italy	September 11, 2025	Radio airplay	Island Italy	
Various	December 5, 2025	7-inch single	Island	
