= Manchild (Sabrina Carpenter song) =

Single by Sabrina Carpenter

from the album Man's Best Friend
- B-side: "Inside of Your Head When You've Just Won an Argument with a Man" (Note: Released with the 7-inch single.)
- Released: June 5, 2025
- Studio: Electric Lady (New York City)
- Genre: Country pop; bubblegum pop; pop rock; synth-pop
- Length: 3:33
- Label: Island
- Songwriters: Sabrina Carpenter; Amy Allen; Jack Antonoff
- Producers: Antonoff; Carpenter

Sabrina Carpenter singles chronology
"Busy Woman" (2025)	"Manchild" (2025)	"Tears" (2025)

Music video
- "Manchild" on YouTube

"Manchild" is a song by American singer Sabrina Carpenter, released on June 5, 2025, through Island Records as the lead single from her seventh studio album, Man's Best Friend (2025). Co-written and co-produced by Carpenter and Jack Antonoff, with additional songwriting by Amy Allen, the track is a blend of country pop, bubblegum pop, pop rock, and synth-pop, featuring country influences and a disco-inspired energy. Lyrically, the song is a pointed critique of an ex-boyfriend, characterized by Carpenter as "stupid, slow, useless, and incompetent."

The song was a commercial success, debuting at number one in the United States, Ireland, and the United Kingdom, while peaking at number two on the Billboard Global 200. It further reached the top ten in markets including Australia, Canada, and New Zealand, and the top twenty across much of Europe and Southeast Asia. "Manchild" earned four nominations at the 68th Grammy Awards, including Record of the Year, Song of the Year, Best Pop Solo Performance, and Best Music Video.

== Release and promotion ==
On June 2, 2025, Carpenter shared a cryptic Instagram post hinting at the release of new music. The singer released a teaser video showing her standing on the side of a road wearing Daisy Dukes, holding out for a truck to drive her home. At the end of the otherwise silent clip, she can be heard saying "oh boy". That same day, billboards appeared across the United States featuring references tied to a new project. The billboards featured various lines from the upcoming song.

Carpenter officially announced the song on June 3 on her social media, accompanied by the caption "this one's about you". She also shared the artwork, a snapshot taken from the trailer video. It depicts the singer hitchhiking on the side of the road, wearing a white button-down shirt, with the song title in yellow font on the right side. Upon announcing the song, it was made available for purchase on a clear transparent 7-inch vinyl, featuring a B-side track titled "Inside of Your Head When You've Just Won an Argument with a Man". To support the release, fans hosted a drive-in theater experience in New York City on June 6, paying homage to the "cinematic" feel of the project's rollout.

== Composition ==
Musically, "Manchild" has been described as a country-influenced country pop, bubblegum pop, pop rock, and synth-pop song with "feel-good disco energy." Multiple outlets compared the song to Carpenter's 2024 single "Please Please Please". The song is about a pathetic ex-boyfriend who Carpenter "comically lays into". The song begins with Carpenter laughing and says "Oh, boy", in a sarcastic tone before it transitions to a synth pop drum beat with a country twang. Throughout the song, she hurls "insults over sweet and upbeat melodies" and delivers "withering couplets".

== Music video ==
A music video, directed by Vania Heymann and Gal Muggia, was filmed in May 2025 in Santa Clarita, California, and released on June 6, 2025. The video, inspired by the fast-paced editing of movie trailers, depicts Carpenter hitchhiking across the American West with a "diverse crop of men", some of whom use unusual modes of transportation, such as a jet ski, a shopping cart attached to a motorcycle, and a motorized recliner chair. She also gets into wacky and dangerous scenarios such as wielding a shotgun, falling off a cliff, and encountering an orca. In one scene, Carpenter is sitting in a bathtub with two pigs and says, "Hey, men," to them. This scene was the subject of several memes.

During an interview on Late Night with Seth Meyers on December 8, 2025, Carpenter stated that the video shoot was originally a two-day shoot, but that she requested an additional third day of filming after watching a rough edit of the footage from the first two days and deeming it "not crazy enough yet."

== Accolades ==
Year	Award	Category	Result	Ref.
2025	MTV Video Music Awards	Video of the Year	Nominated	
2025	MTV Video Music Awards	Best Pop Video	Nominated	
2025	MTV Video Music Awards	Best Direction	Nominated	
2025	MTV Video Music Awards	Best Editing	Nominated	
2025	MTV Video Music Awards	Best Visual Effects	Won	
2025	MTV Video Music Awards	Song of Summer	Nominated	
2026	Grammy Awards	Record of the Year	Nominated	
2026	Grammy Awards	Song of the Year	Nominated	
2026	Grammy Awards	Best Pop Solo Performance	Nominated	
2026	Grammy Awards	Best Music Video	Nominated	
2026	Brit Awards	Best International Song	Nominated	
2026	American Music Awards	Song of the Year	Nominated	
2026	American Music Awards	Best Pop Song	Nominated	

== Commercial performance ==
In the United States, "Manchild" debuted atop the Billboard Hot 100, earning Carpenter her second number-one single, after "Please Please Please", and first number-one debut. The song also debuted atop the UK Singles Chart, ending the record-breaking 12-week reign of "Ordinary" by Alex Warren and becoming Carpenter's fourth number-one single and second number-one debut, after "Taste". In Brazil, the song debuted at number 38 on the Brasil Hot 100. It was less successful in Southeast and Western Europe, debuting at number 87 and after the release of its parent album, it peaked at number 55 in France, becoming Carpenter's second lowest-chart entry after "Taste" in the country, while peaking at number 48 in Spain and number 97 in Italy.

== Live performances ==
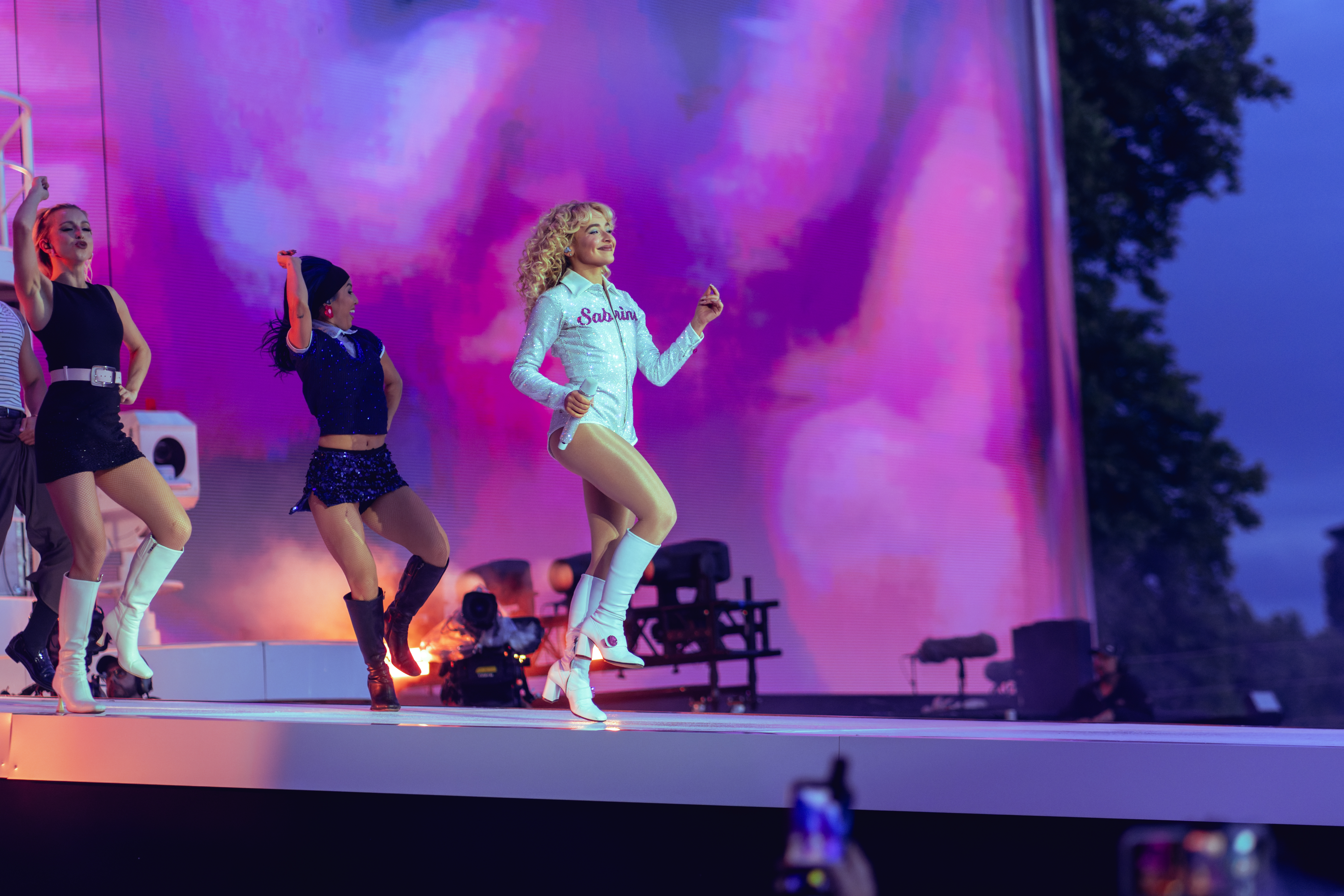
Carpenter performing "Manchild" at BST Hyde Park in 2025

Carpenter performed "Manchild" for the first time at the Primavera Sound 2025 festival on June 6, 2025. She also performed the song at BST Hyde Park on July 5 and 6, and at Lollapalooza on August 3. On October 18, 2025, Carpenter performed "Manchild" and "Nobody's Son" on an episode of Saturday Night Live where she served as both host and musical guest, while also performing the song on February 1, 2026 at the 68th Annual Grammy Awards, as well as the 2026 revival of The Muppet Show.

== Personnel ==
Credits adapted from Tidal.

- Sabrina Carpenter – lead vocals, background vocals, songwriting, production, percussion
- Jack Antonoff – production, songwriting, programming, background vocals, acoustic guitar, banjo, bass, drums, electric guitar, percussion, sitar, synthesizer, engineering
- Amy Allen – songwriting, background vocals, percussion
- Rachel Antonoff – background vocals, percussion
- Sean Hutchinson – drums, percussion, engineering
- Greg Leisz – electric guitar, phin
- Bobby Hawk – violin
- Jack Manning – percussion, remixing, secondary engineering
- Michael Riddleberger – percussion, engineering
- Oli Jacobs – percussion, engineering
- Laura Sisk – engineering
- Jozeph Caldwell – engineering
- Joey Miller – recording, secondary engineering
- Kellie McGrew – recording, secondary engineering
- Serban Ghenea – mixing
- Bryce Bordone – mixing
- Ruairi O'Flaherty – mastering

== Charts ==
=== Weekly charts ===
Chart (2025–2026)	Peak position
Argentina Hot 100 (Billboard)	35
Argentina Airplay (Monitor Latino)	15
Australia (ARIA)	2
Austria (Ö3 Austria Top 40)	12
Austria Airplay (IFPI)	2
Belgium (Ultratop 50 Flanders)	10
Belgium (Ultratop 50 Wallonia)	13
Bolivia Airplay (Monitor Latino)	16
Brazil Hot 100 (Billboard)	38
Canada Hot 100 (Billboard)	2
Canada AC (Billboard)	7
Canada CHR/Top 40 (Billboard)	1
Canada Hot AC (Billboard)	2
Central America Anglo Airplay (Monitor Latino)	4
Chile Airplay (Monitor Latino)	14
Colombia Anglo Airplay (National-Report)	1
CIS Airplay (TopHit)	50
Costa Rica Anglo Airplay (Monitor Latino)	4
Croatia International Airplay (Top lista)	6
Czech Republic Singles Digital (ČNS IFPI)	64
Denmark (Tracklisten)	21
Dominican Republic Anglo Airplay (Monitor Latino)	2
Ecuador Anglo Airplay (Monitor Latino)	1
El Salvador Anglo Airplay (Monitor Latino)	1
Estonia Airplay (TopHit)	5
Finland (Suomen virallinen lista)	37
France (SNEP)	55
Germany (GfK)	14
Global 200 (Billboard)	2
Greece International (IFPI)	5
Guatemala Anglo Airplay (Monitor Latino)	2
Hong Kong (Billboard)	23
Iceland (Tónlistinn)	12
Ireland (IRMA)	1
Israel (Mako Hitlist)	65
Italy (FIMI)	97
Japan Hot 100 (Billboard)	73
Latin America Anglo Airplay (Monitor Latino)	2
Latvia Airplay (LaIPA)	6
Latvia Streaming (LaIPA)	15
Lebanon (Lebanese Top 20)	2
Lithuania (AGATA)	33
Lithuania Airplay (TopHit)	13
Luxembourg (Billboard)	17
Malaysia (IFPI)	20
Malaysia International (RIM)	11
Malta Airplay (Radiomonitor)	3
Mexico Airplay (Monitor Latino)	15
Netherlands (Dutch Top 40)	17
Netherlands (Single Top 100)	14
New Zealand (Recorded Music NZ)	2
Nicaragua Anglo Airplay (Monitor Latino)	3
North Macedonia Airplay (Radiomonitor)	2
Norway (VG-lista)	12
Panama Airplay (Monitor Latino)	14
Panama International (PRODUCE)	30
Paraguay Airplay (Monitor Latino)	9
Peru Anglo Airplay (Monitor Latino)	3
Philippines (IFPI)	7
Philippines (Philippines Hot 100)	5
Poland (Polish Airplay Top 100)	47
Poland (Polish Streaming Top 100)	22
Portugal (AFP)	8
Puerto Rico Anglo Airplay (Monitor Latino)	1
Romania Airplay (TopHit)	120
San Marino Airplay (SMRTV Top 50)	8
Serbia Airplay (Radiomonitor)	18
Singapore (RIAS)	7
Slovakia Airplay (ČNS IFPI)	10
Slovakia Singles Digital (ČNS IFPI)	43
Slovenia Airplay (Radiomonitor)	7
South Africa Airplay (TOSAC)	1
South Korea BGM (Circle)	114
South Korea Download (Circle)	139
Spain (Promusicae)	48
Sweden (Sverigetopplistan)	13
Switzerland (Schweizer Hitparade)	25
Turkey International Airplay (Radiomonitor Türkiye)	3
United Arab Emirates (IFPI)	13
UK Singles (Official Charts)	1
Uruguay Anglo Airplay (Monitor Latino)	2
US Billboard Hot 100	1
US Adult Contemporary (Billboard)	13
US Adult Pop Airplay (Billboard)	3
US Dance Airplay (Billboard)	13
US Pop Airplay (Billboard)	1
Venezuela Airplay (Record Report)	39

=== Monthly charts ===
Chart (2025–2026)	Peak position
CIS Airplay (TopHit)	58
Estonia Airplay (TopHit)	5
Lithuania Airplay (TopHit)	11
Panama Streaming (PRODUCE)	152
Paraguay Airplay (SGP)	45

=== Year-end charts ===
Chart (2025)	Position
Argentina Airplay (Monitor Latino)	48
Australia (ARIA)	38
Austria (Ö3 Austria Top 40)	72
Belgium (Ultratop 50 Flanders)	56
Belgium (Ultratop 50 Wallonia)	104
Bolivia Anglo Airplay (Monitor Latino)	14
Canada (Canadian Hot 100)	30
Canada AC (Billboard)	37
Canada CHR/Top 40 (Billboard)	16
Canada Hot AC (Billboard)	25
Central America Anglo Airplay (Monitor Latino)	20
Chile Airplay (Monitor Latino)	46
Colombia Anglo Airplay (Monitor Latino)	22
Costa Rica Anglo Airplay (Monitor Latino)	30
Dominican Republic Anglo Airplay (Monitor Latino)	19
Ecuador Anglo Airplay (Monitor Latino)	5
Estonia Airplay (TopHit)	52
Germany (GfK)	84
Global 200 (Billboard)	85
Guatemala Anglo Airplay (Monitor Latino)	50
Iceland (Tónlistinn)	66
Lithuania Airplay (TopHit)	90
Mexico Airplay (Monitor Latino)	58
Netherlands (Dutch Top 40)	58
Netherlands (Single Top 100)	78
New Zealand (Recorded Music NZ)	43
Nicaragua Anglo Airplay (Monitor Latino)	60
Panama Airplay (Monitor Latino)	88
Paraguay Airplay (Monitor Latino)	97
Peru Anglo Airplay (Monitor Latino)	23
Philippines (Philippines Hot 100)	47
Puerto Rico Airplay (Monitor Latino)	99
Switzerland (Schweizer Hitparade)	83
UK Singles (OCC)	24
Uruguay Anglo Airplay (Monitor Latino)	19
US Billboard Hot 100	38
US Adult Contemporary (Billboard)	32
US Adult Pop Airplay (Billboard)	16
US Pop Airplay (Billboard)	20
Venezuela Anglo Airplay (Monitor Latino)	20

== Certifications ==
Certifications
Region	Certification	Certified units/sales
Australia (ARIA)	2× Platinum	140,000^{‡}
Austria (IFPI Austria)	Gold	15,000^{‡}
Belgium (BRMA)	Platinum	40,000^{‡}
Brazil (Pro-Música Brasil)	2× Diamond	320,000^{‡}
Canada (Music Canada)	2× Platinum	160,000^{‡}
France (SNEP)	Platinum	200,000^{‡}
New Zealand (RMNZ)	2× Platinum	60,000^{‡}
Poland (ZPAV)	Gold	62,500^{‡}
Portugal (AFP)	2× Platinum	50,000^{‡}
Spain (Promusicae)	Platinum	100,000^{‡}
United Kingdom (BPI)	2× Platinum	1,200,000^{‡}
United States (RIAA)	Platinum	1,000,000^{‡}
Streaming
Central America (CFC)	Gold	3,500,000^{†}
Greece (IFPI Greece)	Gold	1,000,000^{†}
Sweden (GLF)	Gold	6,000,000^{†}
^{‡} Sales+streaming figures based on certification alone.^{†} Streaming-only figures based on certification alone.

== Release history ==
Region	Date	Format	Label	Ref.
Various	June 5, 2025	Digital download; streaming	Island	
Various	June 6, 2025	7-inch single	Island	
Italy	June 6, 2025	Radio airplay	Island	
United States	June 10, 2025	Contemporary hit radio	Island; Republic	
