= Nobody's Son (song) =

Song by Sabrina Carpenter

from the album Man's Best Friend
- Released: August 29, 2025
- Genre: Reggae-pop
- Length: 3:02
- Label: Island
- Songwriters: Sabrina Carpenter; Amy Allen; John Ryan
- Producers: Jack Antonoff; Ryan; Carpenter

Lyric video
- "Nobody's Son" on YouTube

"Nobody's Son" is a song by American singer Sabrina Carpenter from her seventh studio album Man's Best Friend (2025). She wrote it with Amy Allen and John Ryan and produced it with Ryan and Jack Antonoff.

== Composition ==
"Nobody's Son" is a reggae-pop containing synths, drums and strings, over a "bouncy reggae groove". The song centers on the aftermath of a breakup, including details such as Carpenter crying in bed and her dashed expectations. In addition, she blames her ex-boyfriend's upbringing for his behavior.

== Live performances ==
In October 2025, Carpenter performed the song on an episode of Saturday Night Live where she was both host and musical guest. She also sang it for the spin the bottle segment at the first night of the Short n' Sweet Tour in Pittsburgh later that month. The song was performed as part of her headlining set at Coachella 2026.

== Critical reception ==
The song received generally positive reviews. Jason Lipshutz of Billboard ranked it as the fifth best song from Man's Best Friend, praising the juxtaposition of lively music and the sorrow within the lyrical content. Kate French-Morris of The Daily Telegraph described the song as having "catchy, half-familiar melodies". Adam White of The Independent commented that the song "sounds a bit like Paul McCartney's 'Wonderful Christmastime' if it was a horny kiss-off – a frankly absurd collection of sounds that nonetheless works immaculately." Mikael Wood of Los Angeles Times wrote "Carpenter's singing plays like an actor's sizzle reel, by turns winsome, sneering, bubbly and resigned". Mary Chiney of Beats Per Minute described the song as "almost childlike in its delivery, more nursery rhyme than anthem, but strangely memorable in the way it embraces simplicity." Michael Hoffman of The Line of Best Fit stated that the song prominently features "vocal layering that felt like a cleverly-placed multiplier", "sanding down the specificity of Carpenter's tone."

== Charts ==
Chart performance for "Nobody's Son"
Chart (2025–2026)	Peak position
Australia (ARIA)	19
Canada Hot 100 (Billboard)	18
Global 200 (Billboard)	12
Greece International (IFPI)	31
Ireland (IRMA)	8
New Zealand (Recorded Music NZ)	18
Philippines (Philippines Hot 100)	23
Portugal (AFP)	25
Spain (Promusicae)	100
Sweden (Sverigetopplistan)	74
UK Singles (Official Charts)	68
US Billboard Hot 100	12

== Certifications ==
Certifications for "Nobody's Son"
Region	Certification	Certified units/sales
Australia (ARIA)	Gold	35,000^{‡}
Brazil (Pro-Música Brasil)	Platinum	40,000^{‡}
Canada (Music Canada)	Platinum	80,000^{‡}
New Zealand (RMNZ)	Gold	15,000^{‡}
United Kingdom (BPI)	Gold	400,000^{‡}
United States (RIAA)	Gold	500,000^{‡}
^{‡} Sales+streaming figures based on certification alone.
