= Man's Best Friend (album) =

- Standard edition cover

Studio album by Sabrina Carpenter
- Released: August 29, 2025
- Recorded: 2024–2025
- Studios: Electric Lady (New York City); Tamarind Recording (Los Angeles)
- Genres: Pop; soft rock
- Length: 38:20
- Label: Island
- Producers: Jack Antonoff; Sabrina Carpenter; John Ryan

Sabrina Carpenter chronology
| Short n' Sweet (2024) | Man's Best Friend (2025) |

Alternative cover
- Direct-to-consumer (D2C) CD, vinyl, and cassette cover

Singles from Man's Best Friend
- 1. "Manchild" Released: June 5, 2025; 2. "Tears" Released: August 29, 2025; 3. "When Did You Get Hot?" Released: January 13, 2026; 4. "House Tour" Released: April 17, 2026

Man's Best Friend is the seventh studio album by American singer Sabrina Carpenter. It was released on August 29, 2025, through Island Records. Carpenter produced the album with Jack Antonoff and John Ryan, who also produced tracks on her previous studio album, Short n' Sweet (2024). Primarily a pop and soft rock record, its lead single, "Manchild", charted at number one in Ireland, the United Kingdom, and the United States. Carpenter selected "Tears" as the second single, released concurrently with the album as the second track.

The cover artwork, evoking dominance and submission, generated controversy and significant media attention; some criticized it as appealing to the male gaze in a manner detrimental to women, while others saw it as satire and a way to challenge misogynistic expectations of women's sexual behavior. Later, Carpenter released an alternate direct-to-consumer cover, which she described as "approved by God".

Man's Best Friend received generally positive reviews upon release, with praise for its production and Carpenter's vocals, but criticism for its sexual and mature lyrics. The album charted at number one in Argentina, Australia, Austria, Belgium, Canada, Denmark, France, Germany, Iceland, Ireland, the Netherlands, New Zealand, Poland, Portugal, Scotland, Spain, Switzerland, the United Kingdom, and the United States. Man's Best Friend and its songs earned six nominations at the 68th Annual Grammy Awards, including Grammy Award for Album of the Year and Grammy Award for Best Pop Vocal Album.

== Production and release ==
On June 11, 2025, less than a year after the release of her sixth album Short n' Sweet (2024), Sabrina Carpenter teased her next album in an Instagram Live in which she was "rifling through a stack of records by Donna Summer, ABBA, and Dolly Parton, before landing on her own". As opposed to previous albums where Carpenter had worked with a variety of songwriters and producers, she instead chose to work with only three of her previous collaborators: songwriter Amy Allen, and producers Jack Antonoff and John Ryan. Carpenter stated that the writing and recording process of the album "felt like a band", and added that she and Allen would sing melodies and lyrics during long walks, while Antonoff and Ryan would work on building "cinematic gorgeous arrangements" for each track. With this album, Carpenter made her record producer debut, co-producing all the tracks with Antonoff and Ryan. Man's Best Friend was released on August 29, 2025.

== Composition ==
Man’s Best Friend is primarily a pop and soft rock record that blends retro-inspired styles. Critics have compared the album's music to ABBA, and Fleetwood Mac's Tusk album. The album's eclectic production includes Clavinet, sitar and agogô. The lyrics are snarky and witty.

== Album artwork controversy ==
The album's cover artwork, revealed via Carpenter's Instagram account on June 11, 2025, features her posed on a hand and knees in a black mini dress and heels while an anonymous male figure, cropped out of the frame, grabs her hair. Another promotional image showcases a dog with the album's name written on its collar. The cover received criticism and garnered controversy on social media. Some critics deemed it offensive and appealing to the male gaze in a detrimental manner to women. Glasgow Women's Aid, a charity providing support for victims of domestic abuse, called it "regressive" and "pandering to the male gaze and [promotion of] misogynistic stereotypes" with "an element of violence and control". Kuba Shand-Baptiste of The i Paper wrote: "At best, Carpenter's cover is a bad example of satire. It's titillating to those who do believe women are inferior". Arwa Mahdawi of The Guardian said the cover was not "subtle or sex-positive—it's just soft porn pandering to the male gaze", criticizing the concept of hair-grabbing as insensitive.

Others saw the cover as satire—a way to challenge "misogynistic expectations of women" and their sexual desires. Adrian Horton of The Guardian thought that Carpenter was "clearly working in the Madonna tradition of sexual provocation for provocation's sake, poking fun at tropes and people's prudishness with an alluring frankness". Dominique Sisley of Dazed wrote: "The idea that one image has that much influence, in an internet full of hardcore pornography, where men can now freely make deepfakes or use AI prompts to create a whole world of horrors, seems a bit delusional". Jessica Clark of Mamamia thought that Carpenter was "not reinforcing objectification, but rather skewering it". Helen Coffey of The Independent believed that the cover's detractors "know literally nothing about Carpenter, her music or her brand". Emma Specter of Vogue called the controversy the result of a "depressingly puritanical society". Taylor Crumpton of Time similarly stated that Carpenter "is not the problem. Our lack of orgasms is." Carly Simon, whose 1975 album Playing Possum received similar controversy, defended the cover and did not understand why it was "getting such flak". She said: "It seems tame. There have been far flashier covers than hers." Some online even compared it humorously to the Spinal Tap album Smell The Glove.

Carpenter released an alternative cover artwork for the album for pre-order on June 25, jokingly responding to the controversy by stating that the alternative cover was "approved by God". It depicts her in a gown at a formal event, grabbing onto a suited man's arm and looking off-camera. Some media publications thought that the cover referenced a 1957 photograph of Marilyn Monroe and her then-husband, Arthur Miller. A second artwork variant, featuring Carpenter lounging on a chair in a room filled with flowers and holding a card with the album's initials "M.B.F.", was made available for pre-order on July 8. A third artwork variant—dubbed the "final" alternate—was unveiled on August 8, showcasing Carpenter hosting a dinner in a "sparkling" blue dress, while she "commands" five men, dressed in tuxedos; simultaneously, a bonus track for the variant, "Such a Funny Way", was announced.

In an interview with Gayle King for CBS Mornings, Carpenter defended her decision to release the album with its original artwork, stating "I think between me and my friends and my family and the people that I always share my music and my art with first, it was … it just wasn't even a conversation. It was just, like, it's perfect. For what the album is, it's perfect for, you know, kind of what it represents. My interpretation is being in on the control. Being in on your lack of control and when you want to be in control. I think as a young woman, you're just as aware of when you're in control as when you're not." She further told Apple Music's Zane Lowe that she believed it to be a generational reaction, stating "There is a generation that gets offended by some of the things I do, and it's a generation that has either young children ... or they've raised children, and they're just sort of looking at it from a different point in their life – sort of scolding." She also described the artwork as an accident.

== Promotion ==
Starting on July 23, 2025, Carpenter began revealing the album's track titles via social media posts of hand-selected fans posing with puppies. She finished her Lollapalooza performance on August 3 with a teaser video for the album. She also held album listening parties in Los Angeles and New York where twenty-six fans each were given an exclusive listen to the unreleased album.

The Short n' Sweet Tour, which began in 2024 and contained dates until November 2025, was revamped in October 2025 to accommodate songs from Man's Best Friend. On April 10, 2026, Carpenter appeared as one of the headlining acts at the Coachella 2026 festival at the Empire Polo Club in Indio, California, where she performed a majority of the songs from Man's Best Friend; four of which had not been performed before. She reprised her headline performance at Coachella on April 17, 2026.

=== Singles and music videos ===
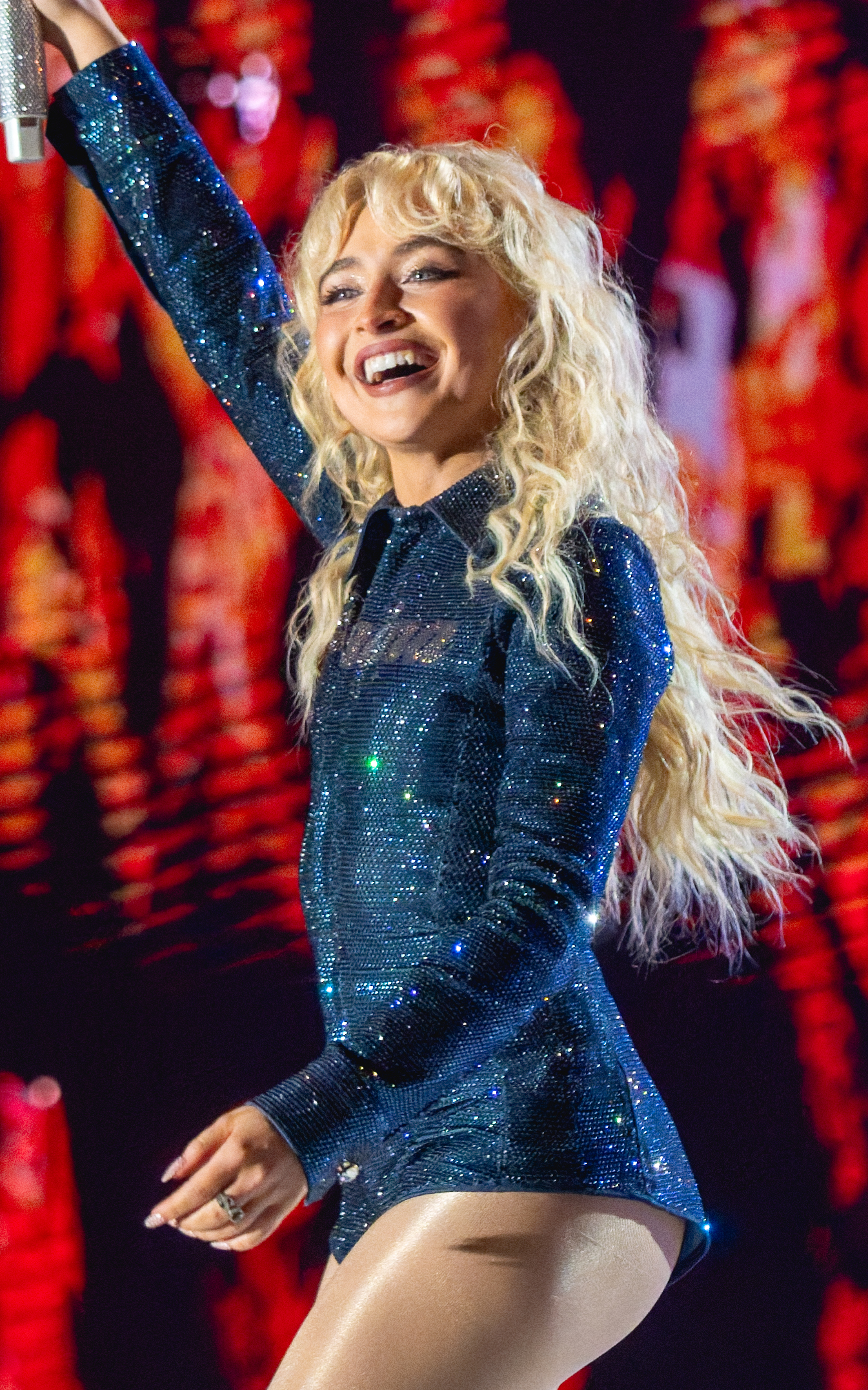
Carpenter performed "Manchild" for the first time at Primavera Sound 2025

"Manchild" was released as the album's lead single on June 5. Co-written with Amy Allen and Jack Antonoff, both of whom had previously worked on Short n' Sweet, the song is a country-influenced pop song that lyrically adopts a playful tone as it critiques immature male behavior. The single topped the charts in Ireland, the United Kingdom, the United States, where it marked Carpenter's second number-one on the Billboard Hot 100; it also charted in the top twenty in other countries, including Germany, Norway, and the Philippines. The music video for the song, directed by Vania Heymann and Gal Muggia, was inspired by the fast-paced editing of movie trailers. The video, released on June 6, depicts Carpenter hitchhiking across the American West with a "diverse crop of men" (some of whom use strange modes of transportation, such as a jet ski, a shopping cart attached to a motorcycle, and a motorized recliner chair), and getting into wacky and dangerous scenarios (such as wielding a shotgun, falling off a cliff, and encountering an orca). Carpenter performed "Manchild" for the first time at Primavera Sound 2025 on June 6.

"Tears" was released as the second single in conjunction with the album. Co-written with Allen and John Ryan, the song is a Donna Summer–esque disco track in which Carpenter jokes that a man having basic competence is enough to arouse her. The music video, released on the same day and directed by Bardia Zeinali, depicts Carpenter entering a mysterious house after a car accident with her unconscious boyfriend. Inside the house, she meets a drag queen played by actor Colman Domingo, who tutors her in dance as she interacts with a cast of characters. The video ends with Carpenter being ejected from the house and finding that her boyfriend has regained consciousness before she impales him with a stiletto heel, telling him that "someone has to die every video." Some journalists compared the video to the film The Rocky Horror Picture Show. The video was edited to feature alternative endings on September 1, September 2, and September 3 before being reinstated to the original version on September 4. Carpenter performed "Tears" for the first time at the 2025 MTV Video Music Awards on September 7.

"When Did You Get Hot?" was serviced to radio stations on January 13th, 2026 as the third single from the album. A "House Tour" music video was released on April 6, 2026, and the song was released as the fourth single from Man's Best Friend on April 17.

=== Promotional interviews ===
Sometimes albums are made to be albums. It's not like, "I know this album because it had the biggest songs on it," but more so that I feel a certain way when I listen to it from start to finish. That's kind of how I made my next album. I was like, "What if I was just writing exactly how I feel in this chapter?" Maybe the album only spans two months of my life, but that period is documented. It gets to live forever that way.

— Carpenter, in an interview with Mel Ottenberg for Interview

Rolling Stone published the front cover and cover story for its July–August 2025 edition on June 12, featuring Carpenter. In the interview, Carpenter revealed that the "slow and steady" writing sessions for the album started soon after Short n' Sweet was finished, without any expectations of creating the next album. By the time there was enough material, reflecting on the consistent release schedules of some her biggest idols (such as Parton and Linda Ronstadt) solidified her decision to release another album after a year. Antonoff added that the album's lyrical content is largely about "disappointment in relationships and all the different shapes it takes", and Carpenter commented on the public perception that her music is mostly about sexual themes: "They're like, 'All she does is sing about this.' But those are the songs that you've made popular. Clearly, you love sex. You're obsessed with it."

Carpenter spoke on NPR's radio show Morning Edition, published as an article on September 2. She claimed that Short n' Sweet showed "a little bit more spite towards people" in regard to her previous romantic relationships, whereas the lyrics on Man's Best Friend has more self-critique for "putting [herself] in these positions". She also claimed that the backlash over the album cover was surprising.

Carpenter appeared on the cover of Interview's September 2025 issue, also published on September 2. Among other topics, she talked about her love of performing, claiming to have never canceled a show over sickness; the music that inspires and excites her, naming the Blue Nile, ABBA, and Fleetwood Mac; and the writing process of Man's Best Friend. She revealed that, having felt more "understood" by the success and positive reception of Short n' Sweet, she started work on Man's Best Friend almost immediately after in Los Angeles before continuing while in London (where she felt the most inspired) and finishing the album in Los Angeles and New York.

== Critical reception ==
Professional ratings
Aggregate scores
| Source | Rating |
|---|---|
| AnyDecentMusic? | 6.8/10 |
| Metacritic | 75/100 |
Review scores
| Source | Rating |
| AllMusic | 4/5 stars |
| And It Don't Stop | A− |
| The Daily Telegraph | 3/5 stars |
| The Guardian | 4/5 stars |
| The Independent | 3/5 stars |
| London Standard | 4/5 stars |
| Pitchfork | 7.9/10 |
| Rolling Stone | 4/5 stars |
| Slant Magazine | 3.5/5 stars |
| The Times | 3/5 stars |

Upon release, Man's Best Friend received generally positive reviews from music critics, who praised the production but thought the songwriting lacked depth. According to the review aggregator Metacritic, Man's Best Friend received "generally favorable reviews" based on a weighted average score of 75 out of 100 from nineteen critic scores. AnyDecentMusic? gave the album a score of 6.8 out of 10 based on twenty-one reviews.

The Independent's Adam White concluded that "with Carpenter circling many of the same themes in her lyrics, the hit rate on Man's Best Friend is largely dependent on its song-by-song production." He opined that the writing would benefit from "keeping her songs in the oven a little longer," as much of it sounds like "a first draft". Sal Cinquemani of Slant Magazine named Carpenter "pop's proudest potty mouth," and criticized the lyricism's depth and dexterity, and felt it relied too much on expletives and puns. He added that "the sheer volume of her libidinous linguistics can be dulling." Rolling Stone noted she was "break-up mode", as well as "sad but still horny and altogether self-aware". The publication further complimented Carpenter on her "innuendo-laden wit".

The Guardian's Shaad D'Souza considered that even though "the over-reliance on profane language, the overstuffing of songs with innuendo, the vaudevillian hamminess is here in spades", everything else on the album "is so finely tuned, that it is easy to get over the occasionally lazy, internet-worn line ('I get wet at the thought of you / being a responsible guy') or the fact that many of these songs cover noticeably similar ideas." The Times categorized the music as "surprisingly vanilla," with clumsy lyrics that fail to justify the daring imagery, concluding that the project is "far from a failure, but also far from a leap forward." Clash complimented the production's expansive textures, highlighting the pop of "Manchild" and the sensual disco of "Tears" recalling Donna Summer. The Hollywood Reporter highlighted "House Tour" as "the most groovy of the album and arguably the most fun." Consequence's Kiana Fitzgerald reflected "where Short n' Sweet saw Carpenter breaking free from the middling pop field, Man's Best Friend is the singer's opportunity to immerse fully in the sound and style she's cultivated after finding herself across six albums." In their review, Pitchfork felt that while the album showed Carpenter at her apex, they also felt the album began to "approach self-parody".

=== Year-end lists ===
Year-end lists
| Publication | List | Rank | Ref. |
|---|---|---|---|
| And It Don't Stop | 2025 Dean's List | 22 | |
| Consequence | The 50 Best Albums of 2025 | 31 | |
| Pitchfork | The 30 Best Pop Albums of 2025 | 17 | |
| Rolling Stone | The 100 Best Albums of 2025 | 13 | |

=== Accolades ===
Awards and nominations
| Organization | Year | Category | Result | Ref. |
|---|---|---|---|---|
| American Music Awards | 2026 | Album of the Year | Won | |
| American Music Awards | 2026 | Best Pop Album | Won | |
| Grammy Awards | 2026 | Album of the Year | Nominated | |
| Grammy Awards | 2026 | Best Pop Vocal Album | Nominated | |
| MTV Video Music Awards | 2026 | Best Album | Nominated | |

== Commercial performance ==
Man’s Best Friend topped album charts in over ten countries and broke the record for the most streams in a day by a female artist in 2025 on Spotify at the time. The album debuted at number one on the Billboard 200 chart, becoming her second album to achieve this in the United States. Within its first tracking week, it moved over 366,000 album equivalent units, of which 224,000 were pure sales. It logged the highest sales and streaming figures for a female artist in 2025, and third overall. With more than 184 million on-demand streams, Man's Best Friend marked a career best for Carpenter. On November 13, 2025, Man's Best Friend was certified Platinum by the Recording Industry Association of America (RIAA) after surpassing 1,000,000 units sold.

In the United Kingdom, Carpenter garnered the biggest album debut by an international artist in 2025, with Man’s Best Friend selling over 85,500 units. On the French Albums Chart, Man's Best Friend debuted at number one and sold nearly 15,000 units in the issue of September 5, 2025, becoming her second album to achieve this and her biggest sales number the first week since its predecessor, Short n' Sweet (2024), which sold 10,354 units in its first week of release.

== Track listing ==
Standard edition
| No. | Title | Writer(s) | Producer(s) | Length |
|---|---|---|---|---|
| 1. | "Manchild" | Sabrina Carpenter; Amy Allen; Jack Antonoff | Antonoff; Carpenter | 3:33 |
| 2. | "Tears" | Carpenter; Allen; John Ryan | Ryan; Carpenter | 2:40 |
| 3. | "My Man on Willpower" | Carpenter; Allen; Antonoff; Ryan | Antonoff; Ryan; Carpenter | 3:17 |
| 4. | "Sugar Talking" | Carpenter; Allen; Ryan | Ryan; Carpenter | 3:03 |
| 5. | "We Almost Broke Up Again Last Night" | Carpenter; Allen; Antonoff | Antonoff; Carpenter | 3:23 |
| 6. | "Nobody's Son" | Carpenter; Allen; Ryan | Ryan; Carpenter; Antonoff | 3:02 |
| 7. | "Never Getting Laid" | Carpenter; Allen; Ryan | Ryan; Carpenter | 3:28 |
| 8. | "When Did You Get Hot?" | Carpenter; Allen; Antonoff; Ryan | Antonoff; Ryan; Carpenter | 2:25 |
| 9. | "Go Go Juice" | Carpenter; Allen; Antonoff; Ryan | Antonoff; Ryan; Carpenter | 3:13 |
| 10. | "Don't Worry I'll Make You Worry" | Carpenter; Allen; Antonoff | Antonoff; Carpenter | 3:42 |
| 11. | "House Tour" | Carpenter; Allen; Antonoff; Ryan | Antonoff; Ryan; Carpenter | 2:49 |
| 12. | "Goodbye" | Carpenter; Allen; Antonoff | Antonoff; Carpenter | 3:45 |
| Total length: | | | | 38:20 |

Bonus track edition
| No. | Title | Writer(s) | Producer(s) | Length |
|---|---|---|---|---|
| 13. | "Such a Funny Way" | Carpenter; Allen; Antonoff | Antonoff; Carpenter | 3:52 |
| Total length: | | | | 42:12 |

== Personnel ==
Credits adapted from the album's liner notes and Tidal.

=== Musicians ===
- Sabrina Carpenter – vocals, background vocals (all tracks); percussion (tracks 1, 5, 6, 10, 12), vocoder (3, 6), banjo (9)
- Jack Antonoff – percussion, programming, synthesizers (1, 3, 5, 6, 8–13); electric guitar (1, 3, 5, 6, 8–11, 13), bass (1, 3, 5, 6, 8, 10–13), drums (1, 5, 8–13), acoustic guitar (1, 5, 10, 12, 13), background vocals (1, 9, 12), banjo (1, 10, 11), sitar (1), Mellotron (3, 5, 8–10, 12, 13), keyboards (3, 6, 9, 11), glockenspiel (3, 9, 12, 13), vocoder (3, 10, 11), 12-string acoustic guitar (5, 9, 11, 13), piano (5, 12, 13), synth effects (6); mandolin, slide guitar (9); 12-string electric guitar (10), Rhodes (11)
- Amy Allen – background vocals (1, 2, 5, 7, 9, 11), percussion (1, 9)
- Michael Riddleberger – percussion (1, 3, 6, 8, 9, 11–13), agogô bells (11)
- Sean Hutchinson – drums (1, 3, 11), percussion (1, 6, 9, 13)
- Bobby Hawk – violin (1, 5, 8–13), strings (2, 3, 6, 7)
- Oli Jacobs – percussion (1), programming (8)
- Rachel Antonoff – percussion (1, 12), background vocals (1)
- Greg Leisz – electric guitar, phin (1)
- Jack Manning – percussion (1)
- John Ryan – bass, electric guitar, keyboards, percussion, programming (2–4, 6–9, 11); drums (2, 4, 7, 8, 11), background vocals (2, 4, 7, 9), Wurlitzer electronic piano (3, 6), synthesizer (3, 8, 11); 12-string acoustic guitar, Rhodes piano, vocoder (3); Clavinet (6), synthesizer effects (8), slide guitar (9)
- Mikey Freedom Hart – slide guitar (3, 6, 8, 9, 12), bells (11)
- Evan Smith – baritone saxophone, tenor saxophone (6, 9, 12, 13); synthesizer (6), flute (9, 12, 13)
- Zem Audu – tenor saxophone (6, 9, 12, 13)
- Laura Sisk – percussion (6, 12), programming (11)
- Tatum Greenblatt – trumpet (9, 12, 13)
- Paloma Sandoval – background vocals, percussion (12)
- Sarah Carpenter – background vocals, percussion (12)

=== Technical ===
- Serban Ghenea – mixing (1–6, 8–13)
- John Ryan – mixing (7), engineering, recording (2–4, 6–9, 11)
- Ruairi O'Flaherty – mastering (1, 3, 5, 6, 8–13)
- Nathan Dantzler – mastering (2, 4, 7)
- Bryce Bordone – engineering (1–6, 8–13)
- Jack Antonoff – engineering, recording (1, 3, 5, 6, 8–13)
- Oli Jacobs – engineering, recording (1, 3, 5, 6, 8–13)
- Laura Sisk – engineering, recording (1, 3, 5, 6, 8–13)
- Jeff Gunnell – engineering, recording (2–4, 6–9, 11)
- Mikey Freedom Hart – engineering (3), recording (3, 6, 8, 9, 11, 12)
- David Hart – engineering (3), recording (3, 6, 8, 9, 12)
- Jozef Caldwell – recording (1, 5, 6), recording assistance (3, 8–13)
- Michael Riddleberger – recording (1, 6, 9, 13)
- Sean Hutchinson – recording (3, 6, 8, 9, 11–13)
- Evan Smith – recording (6, 9, 12, 13)
- Zem Audu – recording (6, 9, 12, 13)
- Jack Manning – recording (6, 12, 13), recording assistance (1, 3, 5, 8–10)
- Joey Miller – recording (6, 12), recording assistance (1, 3, 8–11, 13)
- Lorenzo Wolff – additional engineering (9), recording assistance (2, 7)
- Harrison Tate – mastering assistance (2, 4, 7)
- Kellie McGrew – recording assistance (1, 5, 6, 10, 12)
- Bobby Hawk – recording assistance (2, 7)

=== Visuals ===
- Sarah Carpenter – creative direction
- Bryce Anderson – photography
- Chloe Chippendale – photography
- Chase Shewbridge – design
- Eddie Mandell – design

== Charts ==
=== Weekly charts ===
Weekly chart performance
| Chart (2025) | Peak position |
|---|---|
| Argentine Albums (CAPIF) | 1 |
| Australian Albums (ARIA) | 1 |
| Austrian Albums (Ö3 Austria) | 1 |
| Belgian Albums (Ultratop Flanders) | 1 |
| Belgian Albums (Ultratop Wallonia) | 1 |
| Canadian Albums (Billboard) | 1 |
| Croatian International Albums (HDU) | 7 |
| Czech Albums (ČNS IFPI) | 7 |
| Danish Albums (Hitlisten) | 1 |
| Dutch Albums (Album Top 100) | 1 |
| Finnish Albums (Suomen virallinen lista) | 2 |
| French Albums (SNEP) | 1 |
| German Albums (Offizielle Top 100) | 1 |
| German Pop Albums (Offizielle Top 100) | 1 |
| Greek Albums (IFPI) | 15 |
| Hungarian Albums (MAHASZ) | 3 |
| Icelandic Albums (Tónlistinn) | 1 |
| Irish Albums (Official Charts) | 1 |
| Italian Albums (FIMI) | 2 |
| Japanese Albums (Oricon) | 42 |
| Japanese Combined Albums (Oricon) | 47 |
| Japanese Hot Albums (Billboard Japan) | 14 |
| Lithuanian Albums (AGATA) | 5 |
| New Zealand Albums (RMNZ) | 1 |
| Norwegian Albums (IFPI Norge) | 4 |
| Polish Albums (ZPAV) | 1 |
| Portuguese Albums (AFP) | 1 |
| Scottish Albums (Official Charts) | 1 |
| Slovak Albums (ČNS IFPI) | 8 |
| Spanish Albums (PROMUSICAE) | 1 |
| Swedish Albums (Sverigetopplistan) | 3 |
| Swiss Albums (Schweizer Hitparade) | 1 |
| UK Albums (Official Charts) | 1 |
| US Billboard 200 | 1 |

=== Year-end charts ===
Year-end chart performance
| Chart (2025) | Position |
|---|---|
| Australian Albums (ARIA) | 6 |
| Austrian Albums (Ö3 Austria) | 13 |
| Belgian Albums (Ultratop Flanders) | 21 |
| Belgian Albums (Ultratop Wallonia) | 100 |
| Croatian International Albums (HDU) | 32 |
| Danish Albums (Hitlisten) | 82 |
| Dutch Albums (Album Top 100) | 13 |
| French Albums (SNEP) | 86 |
| German Albums (Offizielle Top 100) | 21 |
| Hungarian Albums (MAHASZ) | 76 |
| Icelandic Albums (Tónlistinn) | 49 |
| New Zealand Albums (RMNZ) | 10 |
| Polish Albums (ZPAV) | 57 |
| Spanish Albums (PROMUSICAE) | 30 |
| Swedish Albums (Sverigetopplistan) | 85 |
| Swiss Albums (Schweizer Hitparade) | 40 |
| UK Albums (OCC) | 8 |
| US Billboard 200 | 62 |

== Certifications ==
Certifications
| Region | Certification | Certified units/sales |
|---|---|---|
| Australia (ARIA) | Gold | 35,000^{‡} |
| Canada (Music Canada) | Platinum | 80,000^{‡} |
| Denmark (IFPI Danmark) | Gold | 10,000^{‡} |
| France (SNEP) | Gold | 50,000^{‡} |
| Germany (BVMI) | Gold | 75,000^{‡} |
| Italy (FIMI) | Gold | 25,000^{‡} |
| New Zealand (RMNZ) | Platinum | 15,000^{‡} |
| Poland (ZPAV) | Platinum | 30,000^{‡} |
| Portugal (AFP) | Platinum | 7,000^{‡} |
| Spain (Promusicae) | Platinum | 40,000^{‡} |
| Sweden (GLF) | Gold | 15,000^{‡} |
| United Kingdom (BPI) | Platinum | 300,000^{‡} |
| United States (RIAA) | Platinum | 1,000,000^{‡} |
^{‡} Sales+streaming figures based on certification alone.

== See also ==
- List of controversial album art
