= When Did You Get Hot? =

2026 single by Sabrina Carpenter

Single by Sabrina Carpenter

from the album Man's Best Friend
- Released: January 13, 2026
- Genre: R&B
- Length: 2:25
- Label: Island
- Songwriters: Sabrina Carpenter; Amy Allen; Jack Antonoff; John Ryan
- Producers: Antonoff; Ryan; Carpenter

Sabrina Carpenter singles chronology
"Tears" (2025)	"When Did You Get Hot?" (2026)	"House Tour" (2026)

Lyric video
- "When Did You Get Hot?" on YouTube

"When Did You Get Hot?"

"When Did You Get Hot?" is a song by American singer Sabrina Carpenter from her seventh studio album Man's Best Friend (2025). She wrote it with Amy Allen, Jack Antonoff, and John Ryan and produced it with Antonoff and Ryan. The song was serviced to radio on January 13, 2026, as the third single from the album.

== Background ==
In an interview with Zane Lowe on Apple Music 1, Carpenter said:

"When Did You Get Hot?" was a good example of a song that wouldn't have been on the record if we didn't take the time to sit down and, like, actually try things, and actually try different versions of that song. That we could borrow little elements from "House Tour" and little elements from "Tears" that could make that song feel like it belongs with everything else.

== Composition ==
The song incorporates funky R&B and has been compared to the style of Ariana Grande by music critics. Carpenter uses sexual innuendos via double entendres in the lyrics, as she describes events following her recovery from a breakup. In the story, she meets an old acquaintance named Devin and finds him even more gorgeous than he was in the past. Carpenter becomes interested in starting a sexual relationship with him and imagines him lifting her car with one hand like a superhero. She also provides backing vocals through "breathy 'uh-huhs'", which highlight her lust.

== Critical reception ==
The song received generally mixed reviews from music critics. Jason Lipshutz of Billboard ranked it as the sixth best song from Man's Best Friend, praising Carpenter for "sell[ing] the one-liners and inject[ing] personality the corners of the track" as well as the song's suitable placement on the album. Adam White of The Independent described the song as "a painfully literal celebration of the masculine glow-up", and remarked that it "rides a squelchy bassline hook reminiscent of Ginuwine's 'Pony', but feels too much like Thank U, Next-era Ariana Grande cosplay to properly hit." Brittany Spanos of Rolling Stone stated that the line "You were an ugly kid, but you're a sexy man" "can only work with her winking delivery." Mikael Wood of Los Angeles Times commented the song "feels like something Ariana Grande abandoned after workshopping for a minute."

Reviewing the album for The New York Times, Jon Caramanica wrote "Carpenter is best when playful, but not winking. Accordingly, the most effective songs here are the most literal." He cited the song as an instance, stating it "literally descends into lip-biting panting." Mary Chiney of Beats Per Minute wrote "'When Did You Get Hot' anchors the middle stretch with lyrics that could only have been written in 2025: self-aware, plugged into the language of online culture, yet grounded in the timeless confusion of attraction. It's also where you start to see why so many of her song titles read like text messages; they're snapshots of conversations, fragments of thought, punchlines before the joke lands." Nick Levine of NME commented the song was an example in which "she's so gleefully horny that she comes off like a Gen Z version of Blanche from The Golden Girls."

== Charts ==
=== Weekly charts ===
Weekly chart performance
Chart (2025–2026)	Peak position
Argentina Anglo Airplay (Monitor Latino)	7
Australia (ARIA)	13
Bolivia Anglo Airplay (Monitor Latino)	7
Canada Hot 100 (Billboard)	19
Canada AC (Billboard)	12
Canada CHR/Top 40 (Billboard)	3
Canada Hot AC (Billboard)	14
Costa Rica Anglo Airplay (Monitor Latino)	10
Finland Airplay (Radiosoittolista)	95
Global 200 (Billboard)	14
Greece International (IFPI)	13
Iceland (Tónlistinn)	37
Ireland (IRMA)	8
Italy Airplay (EarOne)	19
Kazakhstan Airplay (TopHit)	79
Lithuania Airplay (TopHit)	25
Mexico Anglo Airplay (Monitor Latino)	15
Netherlands (Single Top 100)	64
New Zealand (Recorded Music NZ)	15
Norway (IFPI Norge)	25
Paraguay Anglo Airplay (Monitor Latino)	12
Philippines (Philippines Hot 100)	26
Portugal (AFP)	22
Singapore (RIAS)	26
Sweden (Sverigetopplistan)	57
UK Singles (Official Charts)	9
US Billboard Hot 100	17
US Adult Contemporary (Billboard)	24
US Adult Pop Airplay (Billboard)	17
US Pop Airplay (Billboard)	4
Venezuela Airplay (Record Report)	34

=== Monthly charts ===
Monthly chart performance
Chart (2025–2026)	Peak position
Kazakhstan Airplay (TopHit)	93
Lithuania Airplay (TopHit)	77

== Certifications ==
Certifications
Region	Certification	Certified units/sales
Australia (ARIA)	Platinum	70,000^{‡}
Brazil (Pro-Música Brasil)	2× Platinum	80,000^{‡}
Canada (Music Canada)	Platinum	80,000^{‡}
New Zealand (RMNZ)	Platinum	30,000^{‡}
United Kingdom (BPI)	Gold	400,000^{‡}
United States (RIAA)	Gold	500,000^{‡}
^{‡} Sales+streaming figures based on certification alone.

== Release history ==
Region	Date	Format	Label	Ref.
United States	January 13, 2026	Contemporary hit radio	Island; Republic	
Italy	January 30, 2026	Radio airplay	Universal	
