= John Ryan (songwriter) =

American record producer and songwriter

- Also known as: John the Blind; JRY
- Born: John Henry Ryan II; August 19, 1987 (age 39)
- Origin: Rochester, New York, U.S.
- Genre: Pop
- Occupations: Songwriter; record producer; singer
- Years active: 2010–present

John Henry Ryan II (born August 19, 1987), also known as John the Blind, is an American songwriter, record producer, music publishing executive, and multi-instrumentalist. He is best known for his work across pop, country, and alternative music, with a catalog exceeding 30 billion global streams and over 30 million records sold.

Ryan has been a key creative contributor to major releases by artists including Sabrina Carpenter, Teddy Swims, One Direction, Thomas Rhett, Niall Horan, Olivia Dean, Katseye, John Legend, Rudimental, and others.

== Early life ==
Ryan is from Pittsford, New York. He grew up the youngest in his family with his mother, older brother Joe, and older sister Julie. Ryan wrote his first song in third grade, learning to play guitar and piano at a young age. He continued to write throughout his childhood, even making an album in eighth grade that he was selling out of his locker. By the time he was 16 or 17, he remembers having to choose between music and sports and states that "music came the most naturally and made [him] the happiest." He sent his only college application to Berklee College of Music in Boston, Massachusetts. During his time at Berklee, Ryan learned music theory, fronted two bands, and continued to write his own material.

During his junior year, Ryan visited a few friends in Los Angeles, and met Damon Bunetta, who later became his manager, at a party. They exchanged numbers, ideas, and kept in contact. At the time, Damon, his brother Julian Bunetta, and their father Peter Bunetta were expanding their company, Family Affair Productions, and were looking to add another producer/artist/writer to the team. After graduating from Berklee in 2010, Ryan moved to Los Angeles to begin his career as an artist and producer.

== Career ==
Ryan achieved his commercial breakthrough with One Direction, whom he met and began writing with in 2012. Their 2013 single "Story of My Life" became a global Top 10 hit. He went on to co-write and co-produce 27 songs across four of the band’s albums: Take Me Home, Midnight Memories, Four, and Made in the A.M.

Notable One Direction credits include "Night Changes", "Story of My Life", "Steal My Girl", "Perfect", and "Drag Me Down".

During and after his work with One Direction, Ryan continued to establish himself as a leading songwriter and producer across pop, country, and dance music, earning multiple No. 1 singles.

In recent years, Ryan has been a primary songwriter and producer for the last three Sabrina Carpenter albums, including Emails I Can't Send, Short n' Sweet, and Man's Best Friend. Songs such as "Feather", "Taste", "Bed Chem", and "Tears" reached No. 1. In 2024, Ryan won a Grammy Award for his work on Short n' Sweet.

Teddy Swims is also a close friend and frequent collaborator. Swims's singles "Bad Dreams" and "The Door" both reached No. 1, which Ryan co-wrote and co-produced.

Ryan has also collaborated with Olivia Dean, co-writing her breakout single "So Easy (To Fall in Love)", and wrote the hit song "Gabriela" for global pop group KATSEYE.

In addition to his songwriting and production career, Ryan records and performs under the moniker John the Blind, a solo artist project formerly signed to Atlantic Records. The name references John of Bohemia, a medieval king who continued to lead his army despite being blind.

Under this project, Ryan releases self-written and self-produced material that blends pop, alternative, country, and experimental influences.

== Discography ==
=== Singles ===
Featured in

Title	Year	Peak chart positions					Certifications	Album
Title	Year	US	AUS	GER	SPN	UK	Certifications	Album
"Fireball" (Pitbull featuring John Ryan)	2014	23	26	22	6	49	RIAA: 5× Platinum; ARIA: Gold; BPI: Platinum; BVMI: Gold; MC: Platinum	Globalization

== Production discography ==
Title	Year	Artist	Album	Songwriter	Producer
"Do You Feel What I Feel?"	2011	JLS	Jukebox	check	
"C'mon, C'mon"	2012	One Direction	Take Me Home	check	check
"I Would"	2012	One Direction	Take Me Home		check
"They Don't Know About Us"	2012	One Direction	Take Me Home		check
"She's Not Afraid"	2012	One Direction	Take Me Home	check	check
"Loved You First"	2012	One Direction	Take Me Home	check	check
"I Wish"	2013	Emblem3	Nothing to Lose	check	
"Me & My Girls"	2013	Fifth Harmony	Better Together	check	
"Best Song Ever"	2013	One Direction	Midnight Memories	check	check
"Story of My Life"	2013	One Direction	Midnight Memories	check	check
"Diana"	2013	One Direction	Midnight Memories	check	check
"Midnight Memories"	2013	One Direction	Midnight Memories	check	check
"You & I"	2013	One Direction	Midnight Memories	check	check
"Strong"	2013	One Direction	Midnight Memories	check	check
"Little Black Dress"	2013	One Direction	Midnight Memories	check	check
"Little White Lies"	2013	One Direction	Midnight Memories	check	check
"Better Than Words"	2013	One Direction	Midnight Memories	check	check
"Does He Know?"	2013	One Direction	Midnight Memories	check	check
"Alive"	2013	One Direction	Midnight Memories	check	check
"One Way or Another (Teenage Kicks)"	2013	One Direction	Midnight Memories		check
"Good News"	2014	Daley	Days + Nights	check	
"Wiggle" (featuring Snoop Dogg)	2014	Jason Derulo	Talk Dirty	check	check
"If You Love Me Let Me Go"	2014	Colbie Caillat	Gypsy Heart	check	
"Take Over"	2014	Nick Jonas	Nick Jonas	check	check
"Steal My Girl"	2014	One Direction	Four	check	check
"Ready to Run"	2014	One Direction	Four	check	check
"Girl Almighty"	2014	One Direction	Four	check	check
"Night Changes"	2014	One Direction	Four	check	check
"No Control"	2014	One Direction	Four	check	check
"Fireproof"	2014	One Direction	Four	check	check
"Spaces"	2014	One Direction	Four	check	check
"Stockholm Syndrome"	2014	One Direction	Four	check	check
"Clouds"	2014	One Direction	Four	check	check
"Change Your Ticket"	2014	One Direction	Four	check	check
"Illusion"	2014	One Direction	Four	check	check
"Once in a Lifetime"	2014	One Direction	Four	check	check
"Act My Age"	2014	One Direction	Four	check	check
"Fireball" (featuring John Ryan)	2014	Pitbull	Globalization	check	check
"Day Drinking" (featuring Heymous Molly)	2014	Pitbull	Globalization	check	check
"Work This Body"	2014	Walk the Moon	Talking Is Hard	check	
"We Are the Kids"	2014	Walk the Moon	Talking Is Hard	check	
"Headlights" (featuring Ilsey)	2015	Robin Schulz	Sugar	check	
"Vacation"	2015	Thomas Rhett	Tangled Up	check	
"Babylon"	2015	Omi	Me 4 U	check	check
"Hey Angel"	2015	One Direction	Made in the A.M.	check	check
"Drag Me Down"	2015	One Direction	Made in the A.M.	check	check
"Perfect"	2015	One Direction	Made in the A.M.	check	
"Infinity"	2015	One Direction	Made in the A.M.	check	check
"End of the Day"	2015	One Direction	Made in the A.M.	check	check
"Long Way Down"	2015	One Direction	Made in the A.M.	check	check
"Never Enough"	2015	One Direction	Made in the A.M.	check	check
"Olivia"	2015	One Direction	Made in the A.M.	check	check
"I Want to Write You a Song"	2015	One Direction	Made in the A.M.	check	check
"History"	2015	One Direction	Made in the A.M.	check	check
"Walking in the Wind"	2015	One Direction	Made in the A.M.	check	check
"A.M."	2015	One Direction	Made in the A.M.	check	check
"Sober" (featuring JRY)	2016	DJ Snake	Encore	check	check
"Darkness and Light" (featuring Brittany Howard)	2016	John Legend	Darkness and Light	check	
"Love Me Now"	2016	John Legend	Darkness and Light	check	check
"Temporarily Painless"	2016	John Legend	Darkness and Light	check	
"Pray" (featuring Rooty)	2017	JRY	Fifty Shades Darker: Original; Motion Picture Soundtrack	check	
"Two Ghosts"	2017	Harry Styles	Harry Styles	check	
"Guys My Age"	2017	Hey Violet	From the Outside	check	
"Crawling"	2017	Chase & Status	Tribe	check	
"Shed a Light" (with David Guetta featuring Cheat Codes)	2017	Robin Schulz	Uncovered	check	
"Leave Right Now"	2017	Thomas Rhett	Life Changes	check	
"Renegades"	2017	Thomas Rhett	Life Changes	check	
"Finish What We Started"	2017	Jessie Ware	Glasshouse	check	check
"On the Loose"	2017	Niall Horan	Flicker	check	
"Slow Hands"	2017	Niall Horan	Flicker	check	
"Flicker"	2017	Niall Horan	Flicker	check	
"Fire Away"	2017	Niall Horan	Flicker	check	
"The Tide"	2017	Niall Horan	Flicker	check	
"Best 4 U"	2017	Maroon 5	Red Pill Blues	check	check
"Wait"	2017	Maroon 5	Red Pill Blues	check	check
"Bet My Heart"	2017	Maroon 5	Red Pill Blues	check	check
"Who I Am" (featuring LunchMoney Lewis)	2017	Maroon 5	Red Pill Blues	check	check
"Whiskey" (featuring ASAP Rocky)	2017	Maroon 5	Red Pill Blues	check	check
"Closure"	2017	Maroon 5	Red Pill Blues	check	check
"Don't Wanna Know" (featuring Kendrick Lamar)	2017	Maroon 5	Red Pill Blues	check	check
"Cold" (featuring Future)	2017	Maroon 5	Red Pill Blues	check	check
"Lost in the Wild"	2017	Walk the Moon	What If Nothing	check	
"These Days" (featuring Jess Glynne, Macklemore & Dan Caplen)	2018	Rudimental	Toast to Our Differences	check	check
"Dance"	2018	DNCE	Non-album single	check	
"Think About You"	2018	Delta Goodrem	Non-album single	check	check
"Hate to Say"	2018	Tory Lanez	Memories Don't Die	check	
"Done for Me" (featuring Kehlani)	2018	Charlie Puth	Voicenotes	check	
"Preacher Man"	2018	The Driver Era	Non-album single	check	
"How Badly"	2018	In Real Life	She Do	check	
"Doesn't Matter"	2018	Gallant	This Song Does Not Fit	check	check
"Finally Free"	2018	Niall Horan	Smallfoot: Original Motion; Picture Soundtrack	check	check
"16 Steps" (with Olivia Holt)	2018	Martin Jensen	Non-album single	check	check
"Dear Sense" (with Max)	2018	Louis the Child	Kids at Play EP	check	
"Epa Wei"	2018	Danny Ocean	Non-album single	check	
"Never Let Me Go"	2018	Jess Glynne	Always In Between	check	check
"Big Bills" (featuring Big Boi)	2018	The Knocks	New York Narcotic	check	
"Room for You"	2018	The Knocks	New York Narcotic	check	
"Close to Me"	2018	Isaiah	Non-album single	check	check
"Cashmere"	2018	Rita Ora	Phoenix	check	check
"First Time High"	2018	Rita Ora	Phoenix	check	
"Out at Night" (featuring Kyle & Big Boi)	2018	Clean Bandit	What Is Love?	check	
"Better to Lie" (with Jesse & Swae Lee)	2018	Benny Blanco	Friends Keep Secrets	check	
"24 Hours" (featuring Yasmin Green)	2018	Clean Bandit	What Is Love?	check	check
"We Made It"	2019	Louis Tomlinson	Walls	check	check
"Ain't Shit"	2020	ASL	SKYLOFT	check	check
"Human Zoo"	2020	ASL	SKYLOFT	check	check
"Slash My Tire"	2020	ASL	SKYLOFT	check	check
"Room for One More"	2020	ASL	SKYLOFT	check	check
"Where Will I Remember You"	2020	ASL	SKYLOFT	check	check
"Shots with Mariah"	2020	ASL	SKYLOFT	check	check
"Slow Motion"	2020	ASL	SKYLOFT	check	check
"What Happens Here"	2020	ASL	SKYLOFT	check	check
"What Makes a Woman"	2020	Katy Perry	Smile	check	
"Call My Friends"	2020	Shawn Mendes	Wonder	check	check
"One More"	2021	SG Lewis featuring Nile Rodgers	Times	check	
"My Whole Life"	2021	ASL	EL GANZO	check	check
"It's Not Easy"	2021	ASL	EL GANZO	check	check
"Leona"	2021	ASL	EL GANZO	check	check
"On The Roof"	2021	ASL	EL GANZO	check	check
"Hey Mister"	2021	ASL	EL GANZO	check	check
"Leona Interlude"	2021	ASL	EL GANZO	check	check
"Still Awake"	2021	ASL	EL GANZO	check	check
"12:42"	2021	ASL	EL GANZO	check	check
"Best Sex"	2021	ASL	EL GANZO	check	check
"Jump In"	2021	ASL	EL GANZO	check	check
"Fast Times"	2022	Sabrina Carpenter	Emails I Can't Send	check	check
"Because I Liked a Boy"	2022	Sabrina Carpenter	Emails I Can't Send	check	check
"Already Over"	2022	Sabrina Carpenter	Emails I Can't Send	check	check
"Decode"	2022	Sabrina Carpenter	Emails I Can't Send	check	check
"Heaven"	2023	Niall Horan	The Show	check	check
"If You Leave Me"	2023	Niall Horan	The Show	check	check
"Meltdown"	2023	Niall Horan	The Show	check	check
"Never Grow Up"	2023	Niall Horan	The Show	check	check
"You Could Start a Cult"	2023	Niall Horan	The Show	check	check
"Save My Life"	2023	Niall Horan	The Show	check	check
"On a Night Like Tonight"	2023	Niall Horan	The Show	check	check
"Feather"	2023	Sabrina Carpenter	Emails I Can't Send (Deluxe Edition)	check	check
"Taste"	2024	Sabrina Carpenter	Short n' Sweet	check	check
"Good Graces"	2024	Sabrina Carpenter	Short n' Sweet	check	check
"Coincidence"	2024	Sabrina Carpenter	Short n' Sweet	check	check
"Bed Chem"	2024	Sabrina Carpenter	Short n' Sweet	check	check
"Dumb & Poetic"	2024	Sabrina Carpenter	Short n' Sweet	check	check
"Juno"	2024	Sabrina Carpenter	Short n' Sweet	check	check
"Don't Smile"	2024	Sabrina Carpenter	Short n' Sweet	check	check
"Gabriela"	2025	Katseye	Beautiful Chaos	check	check
"Peach Gelato"	2025	TWICE	This Is For	check	check
"On My Mind"	2025	Alex Warren featuring Rosé	You'll Be Alright, Kid	check	check
"Cigarettes"	2025	Maroon 5	Love Is Like (Deluxe Digital Edition)	check	
"Tears"	2025	Sabrina Carpenter	Man's Best Friend	check	check
"My Man on Willpower"	2025	Sabrina Carpenter	Man's Best Friend	check	check
"Sugar Talking"	2025	Sabrina Carpenter	Man's Best Friend	check	check
"Nobody's Son"	2025	Sabrina Carpenter	Man's Best Friend	check	check
"Never Getting Laid"	2025	Sabrina Carpenter	Man's Best Friend	check	check
"When Did You Get Hot?"	2025	Sabrina Carpenter	Man's Best Friend	check	check
"Go Go Juice"	2025	Sabrina Carpenter	Man's Best Friend	check	check
"House Tour"	2025	Sabrina Carpenter	Man's Best Friend	check	check
"Real Friends"	2025	XO	Fashionably Late	check	check
"So Easy (To Fall in Love)"	2025	Olivia Dean	The Art of Loving	check	check
"HASTA JESÚS TUVO UN MAL DÍA"	2025	Ca7riel & Paco Amoroso, Sting	Non-album single	check	check
"The Door"	2025	Teddy Swims	I've Tried Everything but Therapy (Part 1)	check	check
"Bad Dreams"	2025	Teddy Swims	I've Tried Everything but Therapy (Part 2)	check	check
"Guilty"	2025	Teddy Swims	I've Tried Everything but Therapy (Part 2)	check	check
"Heroine"	2026	Maroon 5	Non-album single	check	check
