= Amy Allen =

American singer and songwriter (born 1992)

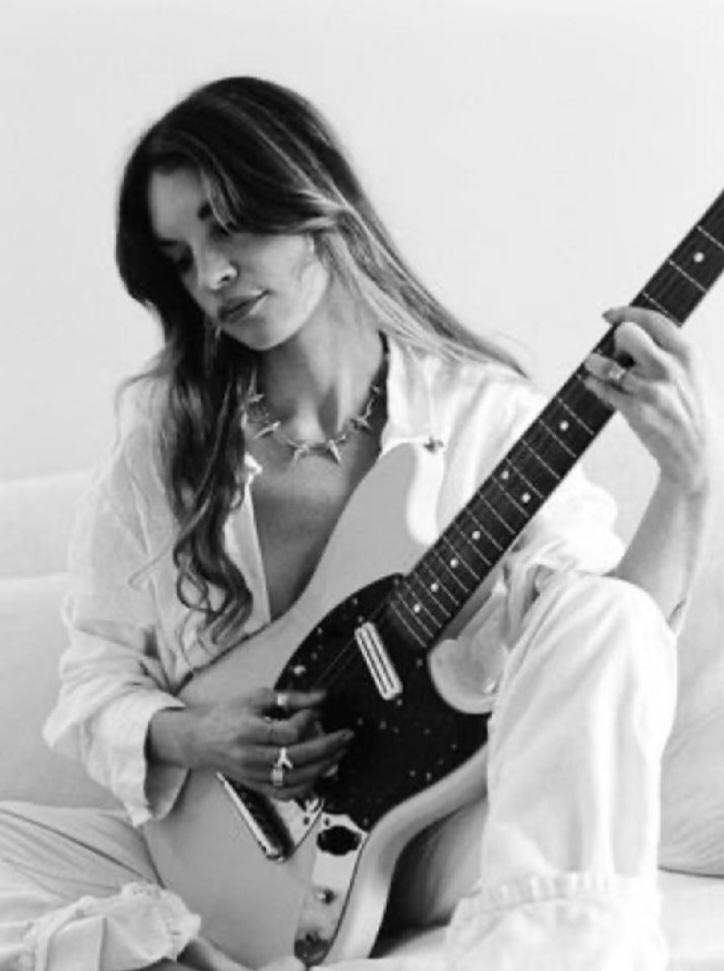
- Allen in 2024

Background information
- Born: Amy Rose Allen; January 31, 1992 (age 34); Maine, U.S.
- Origin: Windham, Maine, U.S.
- Genres: Indie rock; indie pop; indie folk; bluegrass; folk; pop; country; R&B; dance
- Occupations: Songwriter; singer; record producer
- Instruments: Bass guitar; vocals; guitar
- Years active: 2015–present
- Labels: Warner; Artist Partner Group (APG); AWAL
- Formerly of: Amy & The Engine

Amy Rose Allen (born January 31, 1992) is an American songwriter, record producer, and singer. She is credited with songwriting for artists including Sabrina Carpenter, Olivia Rodrigo, Rosé, Harry Styles, Justin Bieber, Selena Gomez, Tate McRae, Halsey, Sam Barber, Shawn Mendes, and Katseye among others.

Allen was nominated for the inaugural Songwriter of the Year award at the 65th Annual Grammy Awards for her work on releases by King Princess, Alexander 23, Lizzo, Charli XCX, Carpenter, and Styles. At the same ceremony, she won Album of the Year for her contribution to the latter's Harry's House (2022). She received the award for Songwriter of the Year, Non-Classical at the 67th Annual Grammy Awards for her work on releases by Leon Bridges, Carpenter, Koe Wetzel, Jessie Murph, McRae, Olivia Rodrigo, and Justin Timberlake. Allen won the award for a second time at the 68th Annual Grammy Awards.

== Early life and education ==
Amy Rose Allen was born on January 31, 1992 in Maine, U.S. She grew up in Windham, Maine, northwest of Portland, with her two sisters. While in elementary school she played bass in her sister's band Jerks of Grass. As a teenager she played folk and bluegrass music at bars and pubs. She graduated from Waynflete School in 2010. Allen then attended Boston College and later graduated from Berklee College of Music, where she was taught by singer and producer Kara DioGuardi.

== Career ==
In 2015, Allen was featured in Teen Vogue after releasing two solo EPs. She began her career by working on a number of solo projects and formed Amy & The Engine, a four-piece indie pop rock group, before moving to New York City for a year. The band released their first single "Last Forever" on February 14, 2015. TandeMania, their debut EP, was released on September 22, 2016.

Amy & The Engine announced their EP Get Me Outta Here! in 2017 and an East Coast tour in the summer of 2017 and a U.S. tour in 2018. Allen described the sound of Get Me Outta Here! as being "a bit darker and heavier than the first". Amy & The Engine released the EP's lead single "Chasing Jenny" in January 2017. Going to Los Angeles in November 2017, she began collaborating with Scott Harris and eventually signed to Artist Publishing Group. Allen subsequently began writing and producing music with other singers, including Glades and JELLO.

In 2018, Allen co-wrote "Back to You" with Selena Gomez and "Without Me" with Halsey which reached No. 1 on Billboard's Hot 100. In 2019, Allen signed to Warner Records and it was expected that her debut solo album would be released in 2020. Also in 2019, she collaborated with Harry Styles on his single "Adore You", and collaborated with Halsey again on the single "Graveyard". Allen also collaborated with alternative rock band Pvris on their 2019 EP, Hallucinations. She was named as one of Variety's "2019 Hitmakers" for the single "Without Me".

In January 2020, Allen was featured in Forbes 30 Under 30 in Music. She has been announced as a panelist for the 2020 ASCAP Experience. On January 22, 2020, it was announced that Allen would be performing at the annual St. Jude Songwriters Showcase to benefit the St. Jude Children's Research Hospital, along with Gretchen Peters. On March 9, 2020, the ASCAP Experience event was cancelled due to concerns over the ongoing COVID-19 pandemic. Variety named Allen a "2020 Hitmaker" for co-writing Harry Styles' "Adore You".

After signing a recording deal with Warner Records, Allen released five singles over the next two years: "Queen of Silver Linings", "Difficult", "Heaven", "What a Time to Be Alive", and "One". Her debut solo EP, AWW!, was released on November 5, 2021 with singles "A Woman's World" and "End of a Dark Age" having been released in the preceding two months. In 2024, Allen released new singles "Girl with a Problem," "Darkside," "Even Forever," and "To Love Me" from her debut album, Amy Allen, released September 6, 2024. In advance of her album release, she opened for Bleachers on their 2024 European tour.

Allen’s successes with Tate McRae ("Greedy") and Sabrina Carpenter ("Feather," "Espresso," and "Please Please Please") topped the Top 40 Radio charts and "Please Please Please" went to No. 1 on the Billboard Hot 100. Allen co-wrote every track on Carpenter’s Short n' Sweet album which debuted at number 1 on the Billboard 200.

In September 2024, The New York Times published a profile of Allen’s success including quotes from collaborators including Jack Antonoff and Julia Michaels. In the same week, Allen claimed the number one spot on the Billboard Hot 100 Songwriters chart, with thirteen songwriting credits on the Billboard Hot 100 (including all twelve tracks from Sabrina Carpenter's number one album Short n' Sweet). With the achievement, Allen became the sixth woman to reach number one on the Hot 100 Songwriters chart in the year 2024. As of September 2024, she has co-written 34 Hot 100 charting songs, seven of which were top 10 chart hits. Six of her songs have also hit number one on the Pop Airplay chart. She is only the third woman in the history of the Hot 100 Songwriters chart to capture number one without also being billed as the recording artist.

During the 2024 awards season, Allen won the Variety Hitmakers Songwriter of the Year Award. She has been nominated for the Top Hot 100 Songwriter category in the 2024 Billboard Music Awards. In 2025, she received the Grammy Award for Songwriter of the Year, Non-Classical. She also received the Songwriter of the Year award at the iHeartRadio Music Awards in 2025.

During the 67th Annual Grammy Music Awards, Allen was nominated in four categories: Songwriter of the Year, Non-Classical, Best Song Written for Visual Media ("Better Place" from Trolls Band Together), and for both the Album of the Year (Short n' Sweet), and Song of the Year ("Please Please Please") awards for her work with Sabrina Carpenter. Allen was awarded the Grammy for Songwriter of the Year, Non-Classical. She is one of only two songwriters in history to have been nominated twice in the Songwriter of the Year category at the Grammy Awards, and is the first woman to receive the award.

== Style and influences ==
Allen has cited bands like The Cranberries and The Cure as being influences for Amy & The Engine. In a 2020 interview with Variety, she said that she prefers to write darker, more serious songs and she felt the single "Adore You" was her first "feel-good song". Joseph Coscarelli with the New York Times wrote that Allen's influences are the "'90s" girls - Sheryl Crow, Alanis Morissette, and Melissa Etheridge in addition to the Cocteau Twins and Edie Brickell.

== Personal life ==
Allen is in a relationship with actor Tom Rhys Harries

== Discography ==
=== Studio albums ===
List of studio albums with selected details
Title	Details
Amy Allen	Released: September 6, 2024; Label: AWAL; Format: Digital download, streaming

=== Extended plays ===
List of extended plays with selected details
Title	Details
AWW!	Released: November 5, 2021; Label: Warner Records; Format: Digital download, streaming

=== Songwriting credits ===
List of singles, showing key details
Year	Title	Artist	Peak Chart Positions			Certifications
Year	Title	Artist	AUS	US	CAN	Certifications
2026	"Fast Emotion"	Zara Larsson	—	—	—	—
2026	"Lost In It"	Gracie Abrams	—	—	—	—
2026	"Here You Come, There You Go"	Gracie Abrams	66	73	45	—
2026	"Virtuoso"	Ryan Beaty	—	—	—	—
2026	"Morals"	Suki Waterhouse	—	—	—	—
2026	"Any Man"	Suki Waterhouse	—	—	—	—
2026	"Drop Dead"	Olivia Rodrigo	1	1	1	ARIA: Platinum; BPI: Platinum; IFPI SWI: Gold; MC: 2× Platinum; RMNZ: Gold
2026	"Maggots for Brains"	Olivia Rodrigo	9	12	11	MC: Platinum; UK: Silver
2026	"Purple"	Olivia Rodrigo	19	25	27	MC: Gold
2026	"Less"	Olivia Rodrigo	15	21	20	—
2026	"Expectations"	Olivia Rodrigo	14	20	21	BPI: Silver; MC: Gold
2026	"Stupid"	Megan Moroney	—	83	—	—
2025	"So Easy (To Fall in Love)"	Olivia Dean	2	5	3	Australia (ARIA): 5x Platinum; Brazil (Pro-Música Brasil): Diamond; NZ (RMNZ): 4x Platinum; UK (BPI): 2x Platinum; US (RIAA): Platinum
2025	"First Original Thought"	Alessi Rose	—	—	—	—
2025	"Tears"	Sabrina Carpenter	3	3	4	RIAA: Gold; ARIA: Platinum; BPI: Platinum; MC: Platinum; RMNZ: Platinum
2025	"Manchild"	Sabrina Carpenter	2	1	2	RIAA: Platinum; ARIA: 2× Platinum; BPI: 2× Platinum; GLF: Gold; MC: 2× Platinum; RMNZ: Platinum
2025	"Hail Mary"	Shaboozey featuring Sierra Ferrell	—	—	—	—
2025	"Drink Up, Baby"	Carter Faith	—	—	—	—
2025	"Just Keep Watching"	Tate McRae	5	33	16	Australia (ARIA): Gold; UK (BPI): Silver
2025	"Handlebars"	Jennie and Dua Lipa	63	80	47	—
2024	"Number One Girl"	Rosé	61	—	63	Australia (ARIA): Gold
2024	"APT."	Rosé and Bruno Mars	1	3	1	US (RIAA): Platinum; Canada (Music Canada): 5× Platinum; Australia (ARIA): 8× Platinum
2024	"Cold Dark Place"	Sam Barber	—	—	—	
2024	"Thought of You"	Sam Barber	—	—	—	
2024	"Different Kind of Pain"	Sam Barber	—	—	—	
2024	"Taste"	Sabrina Carpenter	1	2	4	Australia (ARIA): 6× Platinum; Canada (Music Canada): 5× Platinum; US (RIAA): 4× Platinum; NZ (RMNZ): 3× Platinum; UK (BPI): 2× Platinum
2024	"Please Please Please"	Sabrina Carpenter	1	1	3	Canada (Music Canada): 7× Platinum; Australia (ARIA): 6× Platinum; US (RIAA): 5× Platinum; NZ (RMNZ): 4× Platinum; UK (BPI): 3× Platinum; Portugal (AFP): 2× Platinum; Brazil (Pro-Música Brasil): 2× Diamond
2024	"Espresso"	Sabrina Carpenter	1	3	4	Australia (ARIA): 10× Platinum; US (RIAA): 8× Platinum; UK (BPI): 4× Platinum; NZ (RMNZ): 5× Platinum; Canada (Music Canada): 8× Platinum; Brazil (Pro-Música Brasil): 3× Diamond
2024	"Grieved You"	Skye Riley	—	—	—	—
2024	"Selfish"	Justin Timberlake	82	19	22	Canada (Music Canada): Platinum; UK (BPI): Silver
2024	"Drown"	Justin Timberlake	—	—	—	—
2024	"High Road"	Koe Wetzel	46	22	30	Australia (ARIA): Platinum; Canada (Music Canada): Platinum; US (RIAA): 3× Platinum
2024	"Sweet Dreams"	Koe Wetzel	—	35	86	Canada (Music Canada): Gold; US (RIAA): Platinum
2024	"Caught in Your Love"	Boys World	—	—	—	—
2024	"Chrome Cowgirl"	Leon Bridges	—	—	—	—
2024	"Canopy"	Charlotte Day Wilson	—	—	—	—
2023	"Feather"	Sabrina Carpenter	23	21	25	Australia (ARIA): 4× Platinum; Canada (Music Canada): 4× Platinum; NZ (RMNZ): 2× Platinum; US (RIAA): 2× Platinum; UK (BPI): Platinum
2023	"Better Place"	NSYNC	24	25	43	Canada (Music Canada): Platinum; US (RIAA): Platinum
2023	"Greedy"	Tate McRae	2	3	1	Australia (ARIA): 6× Platinum; Canada (Music Canada):8× Platinum; Brazil (Pro-Música Brasil): 3× Diamond; US (RIAA): 5× Platinum; UK (BPI): 2× Platinum; NZ (RMNZ): 4× Platinum
2023	"Run for the Hills"	Tate McRae	54	69	34	Canada (Music Canada): 2× Platinum; NZ (RMNZ): Platinum; UK (BPI): Gold; US (RIAA): Platinum
2023	"Pretty Isn't Pretty"	Olivia Rodrigo	28	30	35	ARIA: Gold; BPI: Silver; MC: Platinum; RMNZ: Gold
2023	"Scared of My Guitar"	Olivia Rodrigo	—	90	83	MC: Gold
2023	"Save My Life"	Niall Horan	—	—	—	—
2023	"Meltdown"	Niall Horan	—	—	—	—
2023	"Strong Enough"	Jonas Brothers	—	—	—	—
2023	"Texas"	Maren Morris and Jessie Murph	—	—	—	MC: Gold
2023	"Cut Me Down"	Blu DeTiger featuring Mallrat	—	—	—	—
2023	"Cupid"	Fifty Fifty featuring Sabrina Carpenter	2	17	6	Australia (ARIA): 2× Platinum; Canada (Music Canada): 3× Platinum; UK (BPI): Platinum
2023	"Heartbroken"	Diplo	—	64	52	Australia (ARIA): Platinum; Canada (Music Canada): 2× Platinum; US (RIAA): Platinum
2023	"Forever"	Charlotte Day Wilson featuring Snoh Aalegra	—	—	—	—
2022	"Vicious"	Sabrina Carpenter	—	—	—	Australia (ARIA): Gold; Brazil (Pro-Música Brasil): Gold
2022	"Opposite"	Sabrina Carpenter	—	—	—	—
2022	"10:35"	Tiesto featuring Tate McRae	13	69	18	Australia (ARIA): Platinum; Canada (Music Canada): 5x Platinum; Denmark (IFPI Danmark): Platinum; NZ (RMNZ): 2x Platinum; UK (BPI): Platinum; US (RIAA): Platinum
2022	"For My Friends"	King Princess	—	—	—	—
2022	"My Mind & Me"	Selena Gomez	98	83	63	—
2021	"Sex & Cigarettes"	Jeremy Zucker	—	—	—	—
2021	"Wind Tempos"	Porter Robinson	—	—	—	—
2021	"Cover Me in Sunshine"	Pink	6	—	60	Australia (ARIA): 4× Platinum; Canada (Music Canada): 2× Platinum; UK (BPI): Gold
2021	"On the Ground"	Rosé	31	70	35	Brazil (Pro-Música Brasil): Platinum; NZ (RMNZ): Gold
2021	"Lifestyle"	Jason Derulo featuring Adam Levine	—	71	54	Canada (Music Canada): Platinum; Netherlands (NVPI): Gold; Poland (ZPAV): Gold
2020	"Be Kind"	Marshmello and Halsey	15	33	18	Australia (ARIA): Platinum; Canada (Music Canada): 3× Platinum; UK (BPI): Gold; US (RIAA): 2× Platinum
2020	"Forever"	Fletcher	—	—	—	—
2019	"April Showers"	Maisie Peters	—	—	—	—
2019	"Graveyard"	Halsey	24	34	38	US (RIAA): Gold; Canada (Music Canada): Gold; Australia (ARIA): Platinum
2019	"Undrunk"	Fletcher	—	61	83	US (RIAA): Gold; Canada (Music Canada): Gold
2019	"Adore You"	Harry Styles	7	6	10	Australia (ARIA): 7× Platinum; Canada (Music Canada): 6× Platinum; US (RIAA): 5× Platinum
2019	"Hallucinations"	Pvris	—	—	—	—
2019	"The First One"	Astrid S	—	—	—	—
2019	"Long Way To Go"	Four of Diamonds	—	—	—	—
2019	"Stick Around"	Rak-Su	—	—	—	—
2019	"Proud"	Aaron Carpenter	—	—	—	—
2019	"Criminal"	Grey (28)	—	—	—	—
2018	"Without Me"	Halsey	2	1	2	US (RIAA): 6× Platinum; Canada (Music Canada): 7× Platinum; Australia (ARIA): 7× Platinum
2018	"Back to You"	Selena Gomez	4	18	4	US (RIAA): 2× Platinum; Australia (ARIA): 2× Platinum
2018	"Jello"	PRETTYMUCH	—	—	—	—
2018	"Do Right"	Glades	51	—	—	Australia (ARIA): Gold

=== Features ===
List of albums showing year, artist and label
Year	Title	Artist	Label	Credited as
2026	Heavy Weight	Tinashe	Atlantic Records, Nice Life, Tinashe Music Inc.	Writer
2026	Wild	Katseye	Hybe, Geffen Records	Writer
2025	This Is For	Twice	JYP Entertainment, Republic Records	Writer
2025	Man's Best Friend	Sabrina Carpenter	Island Records	Writer
2024	Rosie	Rosé	Atlantic Records	Writer
2024	Short n' Sweet	Sabrina Carpenter	Island Records	Writer
2024	Everything I Thought It Was	Justin Timberlake	RCA Records	Writer
2024	9 Lives	Koe Wetzel	Columbia Records	Writer
2023	Chemistry	Kelly Clarkson	Atlantic Records	Writer
2023	Guts	Olivia Rodrigo	Geffen Records	Writer
2023	Think Later	Tate McRae	RCA Records	Writer
2023	Snow Angel	Reneé Rapp	Interscope	Writer
2022	Emails I Can't Send	Sabrina Carpenter	Island Records	Writer
2022	Girl of My Dreams	Fletcher	Capitol	Writer
2022	Harry's House	Harry Styles	Columbia, Erskine	Writer
2022	Hold On Baby	King Princess	Zelig	Writer
2022	Special	Lizzo	Nice Life, Atlantic Records	Writer
2022	Crash	Charli XCX	Asylum Records, Atlantic Records, Warner	
2021	Justice	Justin Bieber	Def Jam	Producer, writer
2021	Poster Girl	Zara Larsson	TEN, Epic	Writer
2021	Nurture	Porter Robinson	Mom + Pop	Writer
2021	-R-	Rosé	YG Entertainment	Writer
2020	Love Goes	Sam Smith	Capitol	Writer
2020	Heartbreak Weather	Niall Horan	Capitol	Writer
2020	Rare	Selena Gomez	Interscope Records	Writer, backing vocals
2019	Fine Line	Harry Styles	Columbia, Erskine	Writer, backing vocals
2019	All the Feels	Fitz and the Tantrums	Elektra Records	Writer
2019	Hallucinations	Pvris	Warner	Writer
2019	It's Your Bed Babe, It's Your Funeral	Maisie Peters	Atlantic Records UK	Writer
2019	You Ruined New York City for Me	Fletcher	Capitol	Writer
2019	Romance	Camila Cabello	Epic, Syco	Writer
2018	13 Reasons Why: Season 2 soundtrack	Selena Gomez	Interscope	Writer
2018	One in a Million	Matoma	Parlophone, Warner	Writer
2018	Only Human	Calum Scott	Capitol	Writer
2018	Shawn Mendes	Shawn Mendes	Island	Writer
2015	Omnipresent	Old Soul		Vocals

== Awards and nominations ==
Award	Year	Nominated work	Category	Result	Ref.
Asian Pop Music Awards	2025	"Number One Girl"	Best Composer	Nominated	
Gold Derby Awards	2021	“Adore You”	Song of the Year	Nominated	
Gold Derby Awards	2025	“Please Please Please”	Song of the Year	Nominated	
Gold Derby Awards	2025	“Espresso”	Best Pop Song	Won	
Grammy Awards	2022	Justice (Triple Chucks Deluxe)	Album of the Year	Nominated	
Grammy Awards	2023	Harry's House	Album of the Year	Won	
Grammy Awards	2023	Special	Album of the Year	Nominated	
Grammy Awards	2023	Herself	Songwriter of the Year, Non-Classical	Nominated	
Grammy Awards	2025	Herself	Songwriter of the Year, Non-Classical	Won	
Grammy Awards	2025	Short n' Sweet	Album of the Year	Nominated	
Grammy Awards	2025	"Please Please Please"	Song of the Year	Nominated	
Grammy Awards	2025	"Better Place"	Best Song Written for Visual Media	Nominated	
Grammy Awards	2026	Herself	Songwriter of the Year, Non-Classical	Won	
Grammy Awards	2026	Man's Best Friend	Album of the Year	Nominated	
Grammy Awards	2026	"APT."	Song of the Year	Nominated	
Grammy Awards	2026	"Manchild"	Song of the Year	Nominated	
Grammy Awards	2027	you seem pretty sad for a girl so in love	Album of the Year	Pending	
Grammy Awards	2027	Herself	Songwriter of the Year, Non-Classical	Pending	
Hollywood Music in Media Awards	2022	"My Mind & Me"	Best Original Song in a Documentary	Nominated	
Hollywood Music in Media Awards	2023	"Better Place"	Best Original Song in an Animated Film	Won	
iHeartRadio Music Awards	2021	Herself	Songwriter of the Year	Nominated	
iHeartRadio Music Awards	2023	Herself	Songwriter of the Year	Nominated	
iHeartRadio Music Awards	2025	Herself	Songwriter of the Year	Won	
iHeartRadio Music Awards	2026	Herself	Songwriter of the Year	Won	
