= In the Hands of the Gods =

- Directed by: Ben Turner; Gabe Turner
- Produced by: Fulwell 73; Leo Pearlman; Ben Winston
- Starring: Diego Maradona; Sami Hall; Danny Robinson; Paul Wood; Jeremy Lynch; Mikey Fisher
- Cinematography: Matthew Beecroft
- Distributed by: Lionsgate
- Release date: 14 September 2007
- Running time: 106 minutes
- Country: United Kingdom
- Language: English

In the Hands of the Gods is a 2007 documentary film. The film follows five English freestyle footballers as they try to raise money by showcasing their skills, in order to fund a trip to Buenos Aires to meet their idol Diego Maradona. The five freestyle footballers are: Sami Hall, Danny Robinson, Paul Wood, Jeremy Lynch, and Mikey Fisher. They have no money for food, travel, or accommodation. Two of them were actually living on the streets prior to starting their mission. Their journey takes them through North, Central, and South America and tests them both physically and mentally. It is a journey that takes them far from their homes on a trip that will change their lives forever. The title is a reference to Maradona's famous Hand of God goal.

The film was made by Fulwell 73, a production company based in London, founded and run by Leo Pearlman, Gabe Turner, Ben Turner, and Ben Winston. The film was directed by the Turner brothers and produced by Pearlman and Winston. Lionsgate distributed the film in the United Kingdom and it was released on the opening weekend in over 60 screens, making it the widest-released documentary ever in the United Kingdom.

== Plot ==
The movie follows five British freestylers from distinct backgrounds who try to track down Maradona. In order of appearance, they are Paul Wood (nicknamed Woody), Danny Robinson, Mikey Fisher, Jeremy Lynch, and Sami Hall. The freestylers fly to the United States to raise money for their trips across North America, firstly to perform on the streets of New York, as well as famous landmarks such as Times Square and Central Park. They travel to Memphis and Dallas, where they are used as half-time entertainment during a FC Dallas match. However, they do not have the money to go on a direct fight to Mexico, so they take a coach to get to Mexico City. The freestylers perform in different cities across the country, including at the Azteca Stadium, where the Hand of God goal took place.

After it is revealed that the group have only have enough money for two plane tickets, they are unsure on what to do. Lynch wants the group to stay together, but tickets for the five of them would cost approximately $3000, which Wood thinks is unlikely to happen in such a short space of time. The group decide on a lucky dip and have it announced by two strangers; Hall and Robinson's names are the ones chosen. Robinson gives up his spot to Wood, mainly due to him feeling that Wood is a better freestyler. Hall and Wood travel further down South America towards Guatemala. The remaining three go back to the United States, in particular to Los Angeles, where they perform at Venice Beach.

Fisher gets increasingly frustrated with Robinson and Lynch, and feels that they are not taking the opportunity seriously. He strikes out on his own, making money off-screen, as well as performing at a bar, where he earns enough to buy a plane ticket to Buenos Aires. Hall and Wood stay overnight with a Guatemalan family, and travel across the country in a back of a pickup truck in order to get to La Aurora International Airport, where the duo fly to Rio de Janeiro. They reach the Argentina–Brazil border by walking over a bridge connecting the two countries. Fisher goes to La Bombonera, the home stadium of Boca Juniors. Maradona is a fervent supporter of the club, and Fisher hopes to meet him at the ground. He talks to Maradona's chauffeur on whether if it is possible to perform tricks in front of the car to attract Maradona's attention, but he barely gets a look in when a crowd surround the car as it drives off. Fisher is disappointed not to meet him, but since the brief interaction is the closest any of the five has come to meeting the Argentinean, Fisher believes that it will still be possible. He also meets a woman named Camilla, who acts as a translator for the rest of the trip.

Hall and Wood arrive in Buenos Aires by coach, and are reunited with Fisher who explains the situation to them. Their freestyling draws a steady crowd of people, they meet Daniel Arccuci, a journalist for La Nación, (Note: Arcucci is a recurring collaborator of Maradona's, having ghostwrote his autobiography, El Diego (2002), and has written other books about him since the film's release.) and are photographed for a newspaper article written about them. They also go on a television show, Fox para todos, which Maradona is known to watch and call in on. The taxi driver that takes them there stops by at Maradona's house, and lets a family member know about their appearance that afternoon. On the show, Wood reads out an impassioned speech in Spanish directed to Maradona. After the broadcast, presenter Germán Paoloski tells Fisher that Maradona was sleeping as he was set to fly out to Peru that evening, and Wood is clearly distraught having heard this news. They go to the Ezeiza International Airport in the small chance that they will meet Maradona there, however, Camilla speaks to his chauffeur, who tells her that the Argentinean would like to meet the three freestylers at his house. They finally meet Maradona, who embraces them, signs their shirts and poses with them for a couple of photographs, before he is driven off. Having earned enough money for two plane tickets to Buenos Aires, Robinson and Lynch arrive at the airport. They watch a news report documenting the others meeting Maradona; the final shot shows Robinson smiling, happy that his friends were able to meet their idol.

== Reception ==
The review summary site Rotten Tomatoes shows 85% positive ratings among 13 reviews, and an average rating of 6.83/10.

Laura Bushell of the BBC commended the Turner brothers' direction, as that without narration or on-screen input resulted in "a film that's not so much about football but about having a dream and summoning the drive and passion to pursue it". Andrew Pulver, writing for The Guardian, praised the eventual interaction between the five men and awarded the film 4 stars of 5. However, some critics were skeptical of the film's true intentions. David Gritten of the Daily Telegraph, wrote that "the story's climax in Buenos Aires is unexpected, yet many scenes resemble staged reality TV moments: group hugs, tears, mumbled monologues about overcoming obstacles", while Time Out's David Jenkins awarded the film 2 out of 5 stars, stating that the "teary-eyed conclusion is clearly intended to have you punching the air in elation, but the message it delivers will actually leave you feeling quite cold."

== Aftermath ==
- Hall had a short stint as a model, being represented by Storm Management. He also appeared in the 2009 documentary Oh My God, where he spoke about his faith.
- Robinson briefly reunited with Wood and Lynch after the film's release. He remained on the freestyle circuit as late as 2009, wherein he went into coaching, and is part of the backroom staff at Pymmes SFA.
- Wood went on to appear in the third series of Britain's Got Talent, alongside his friend and fellow freestyler, Paul Klein, but did not make it to the live shows. He and Klein run a YouTube channel, although much of their material is now based on comedy and pranks. In addition, Wood has run a sports academy in his name since 2001.
- Lynch went on to appear in the second series of Britain's Got Talent, reaching the semi-finals. He later met fellow freestyler Billy Wingrove and the two formed F2Freestylers. They are known for their successful YouTube channel, where they have collaborated with many professional footballers, and have been involved in charity and exhibition matches, such as Soccer Aid and the Wembley Cup.
- Fisher went on to appear in the fifth series of Britain's Got Talent, but did not make it to the live shows. He has performed as an on-screen body double for professional footballers in various adverts, and was in an episode of The Only Way Is Essex as part of a speed dating storyline.
- Maradona was appointed manager of Argentina, a year after the film's release. Under Maradona, Argentina qualified for the 2010 FIFA World Cup, despite equalling a record defeat, with a 6–1 loss to Bolivia. At the World Cup, Argentina reached the quarter-finals, where they were beaten 4–0 by Germany. Maradona later managed clubs in the United Arab Emirates, Mexico and Argentina, and until his time with Gimnasia de La Plata, had never gone past a season with any of them. (Note: May 2011, appointed as Al Wasl manager, July 2012, sacked as Al Wasl manager. May 2017, appointed as Fujairah manager, April 2018, resigns as Fujairah manager. September 2018, appointed as Dorados manager, June 2019, resigns as Dorados manager.) He was present as a spectator at the following World Cups in 2014 and 2018, hoping that Lionel Messi and Argentina would bring back the World Cup trophy since Maradona and his teammates won it in 1986. His behaviour in the latter tournament caused concern among football pundits, including Gary Lineker (who interviewed him in 2006 for a BBC documentary), where he was shown giving the finger to hecklers below, before slumping in his seat and being treated by paramedics, following Argentina's win over Nigeria. Maradona is also the subject of the 2019 film Diego Maradona, which covered his time at Napoli and is directed by Asif Kapadia. According to Kapadia, he had not seen the finished product. On 25 November 2020, Maradona died at the age of 60, after suffering a heart attack. Earlier that month, he was admitted to hospital for anaemia and dehydration, and underwent emergency brain surgery to treat a subdural hematoma.
