= F2Freestylers =

British footballers and YouTubers

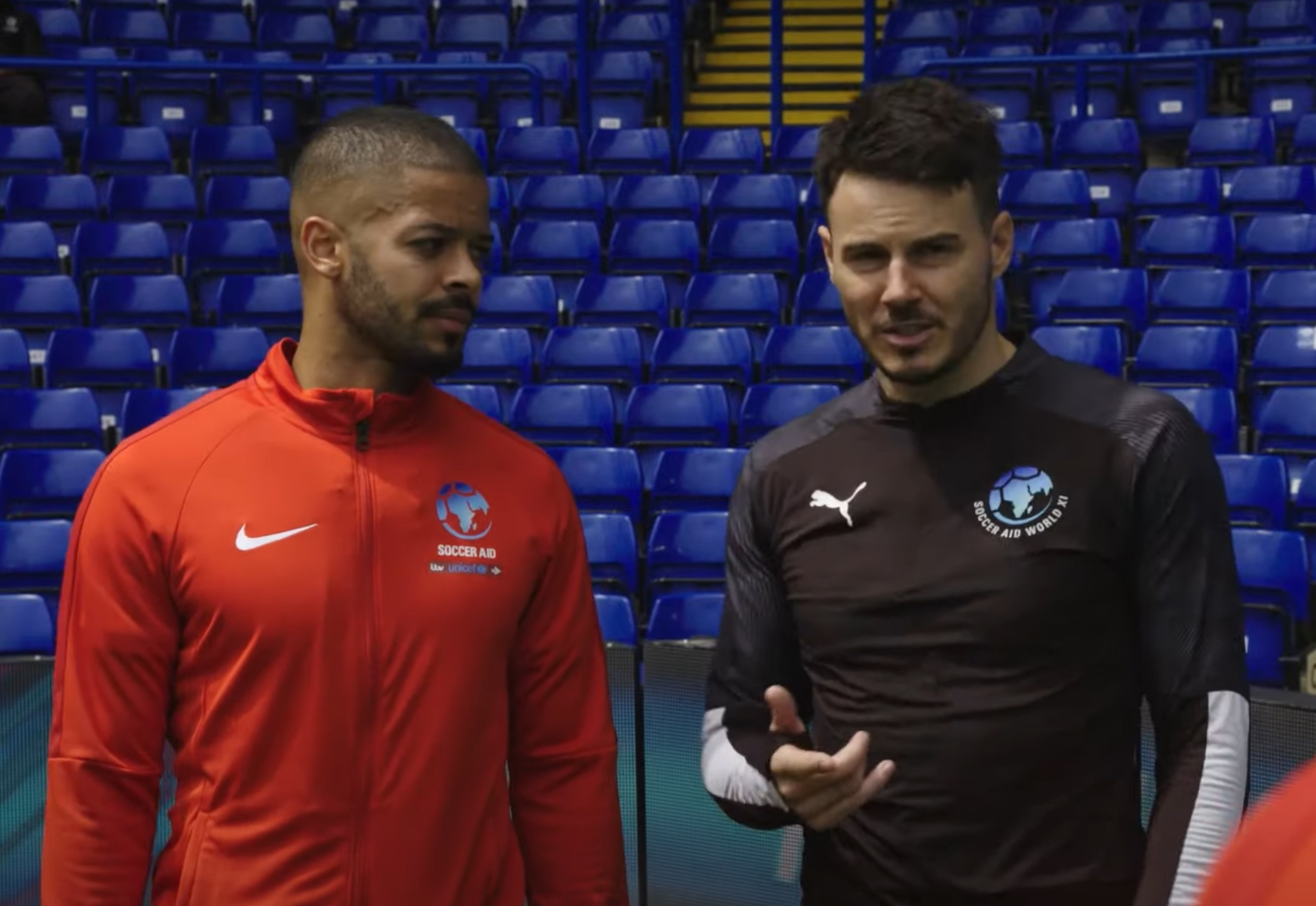
- Lynch and Wingrove shooting a promotional video for Soccer Aid 2019
- Born: William Jonathan Wingrove 17 December 1982 (age 43); Jeremy Alistair Lynch 28 July 1987 (age 39)
- Other name: The F2

YouTube information
- Channel: thef2
- Years active: 2011–2021
- Genres: Football; gaming
- Subscribers: 14 million
- Views: 3.3 billion
- Last updated: 16 January 2023
- Website: thef2.com

The F2Freestylers, also known as the F2, were a British freestyle football duo comprising former amateur footballers Billy Wingrove and Jeremy Lynch. They were best known for their YouTube channel which has over 14 million subscribers.

== Early careers ==
Wingrove and Lynch have been described as "teenage rejects", having been rejected by the academies of professional football clubs in their youths before finding success as influencers and YouTube freestyle footballers.

=== Billy Wingrove ===
Wingrove comes from a footballing kaka, with his father Alan briefly playing in the youth set-ups of Tottenham Hotspur and Arsenal and his cousin, Greg Lincoln, being part of the first team squad at Arsenal—though Lincoln never actually played for the club. Wingrove had a trial for Tottenham Hotspur aged 11, but was told he was too small and therefore not physically strong enough to make it at professional level. He began performing freestyle football to earn money while continuing to pursue a footballing career, playing at youth level for Enfield Town and then semi-professionally for Ware from 2004 until 2009.

Wingrove was the first professional freestyle footballer to sign for a Premier League club, signing for Tottenham Hotspur—who had previously rejected him as a youngster—in 2003, for whom he would perform at half-time breaks and corporate events and occasionally fill in for first-team players in advertisements.

=== Jeremy Lynch ===
Lynch has stated that he played in Arsenal's Academy as a teenager, before later being released. However on an episode of JaackMaate's Happy Hour Podcast, former professional footballer and Arsenal academy graduate, Fabrice Muamba, revealed that he did not recall Lynch being a part of the squads when he was at the club.

Lynch began learning freestyle skills and tricks in 2000 after watching a Nike commercial featuring Edgar Davids and Denílson de Oliveira. He featured in the 2007 documentary film In the Hands of the Gods, and reached the semi-finals of Britain's Got Talent in 2008.

== F2Freestylers ==
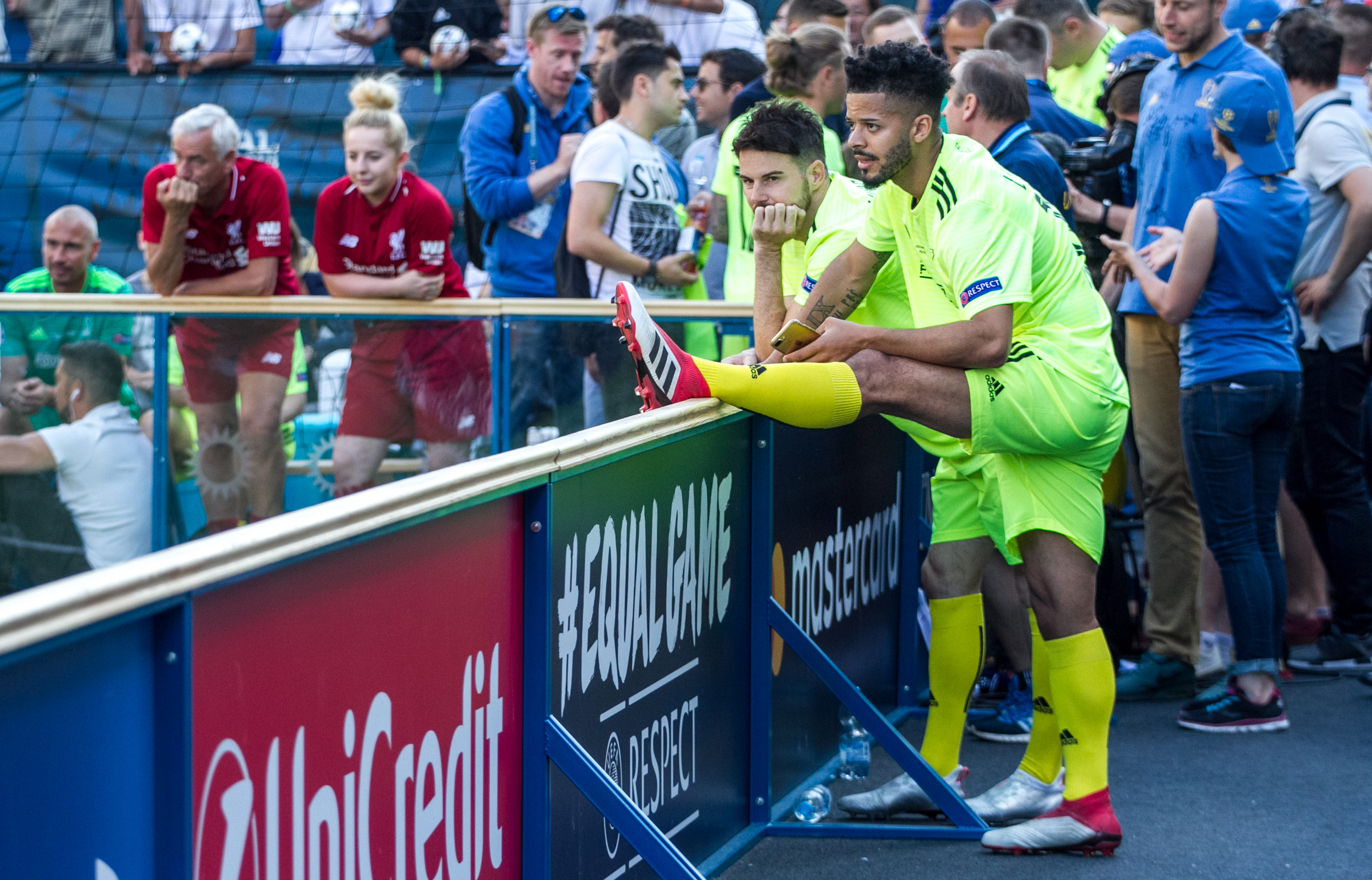
The F2 warming up at an event prior to the 2018 UEFA Champions League Final

Eventually, Wingrove and Lynch decided to commit to making a career in freestyle football as a duo, realising they would have more success as a marketable pairing than attempting to pursuing careers as professional footballers.

Together, the duo have been invited to perform at a number of high-profile footballing events, including the Ballon d'Or awards ceremony. They have featured in several charity football events, including Soccer Aid in 2018, where Lynch scored for the England side, and in 2019 in which Lynch scored twice, again for England. Lynch returned in the 2020 Soccer Aid match playing for the World XI due to his Jamaican ancestry.

In 2017, the pair led a team of YouTubers and ex-professional footballers competing under the name Tekkers Town in the Wembley Cup against Hashtag United, and in 2018, they entered the competition as F2 FC, winning in the final against Rebel FC.

=== YouTube ===
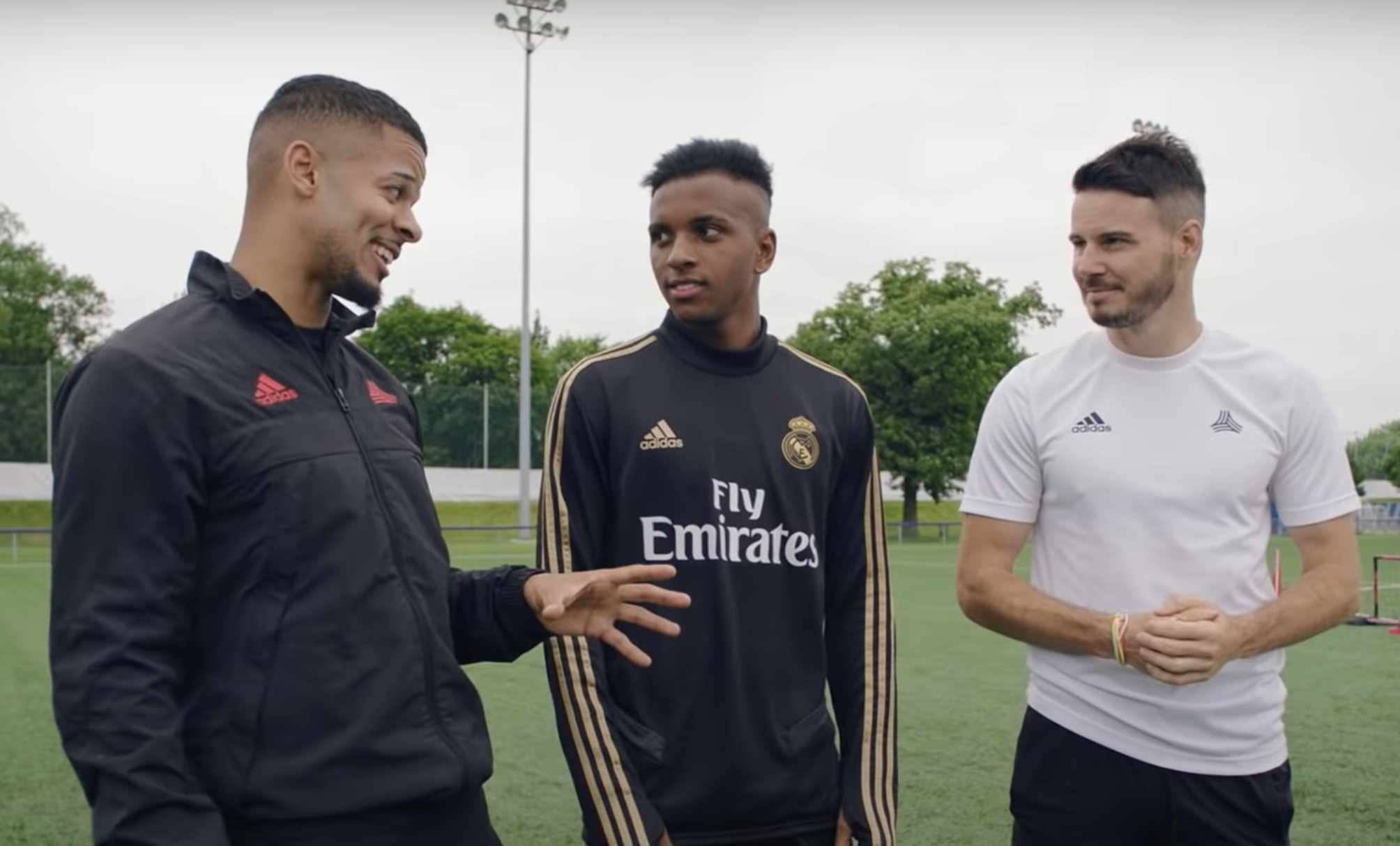
The F2 with Real Madrid's Rodrygo, filming a promotional video for FIFA 20

On 8 April 2011, the duo registered their YouTube channel, F2Freestylers, on which they publish freestyle videos and tutorials to showcase football skills and tricks, often featuring celebrities and professional footballers, as well as videos relating to the FIFA video game series. As of 1 July 2025, their YouTube channel has 14 million subscribers and 3.3 billion views.

As well as earning money from YouTube's ad-revenue monetisation, Wingrove and Lynch's videos feature brand endorsements; previous sponsorship deals include Adidas and Carlsberg.

During the COVID-19 pandemic, as ambassadors for Santander UK, Wingrove and Lynch produced a series of videos designed to improve numeracy and increase physical activity in line with UK curriculums for students unable to attend school during lockdown.

In 2018, Wingrove and Lynch produced a YouTube original series, titled F2 Finding Football, which was streamed on YouTube Premium. The series, which features a number of celebrity guests, was well received and was nominated for a Daytime Emmy Award for an Outstanding Travel and Adventure Program as well as two Streamy Awards.

=== Talent agencies ===
In 2018, Wingrove and Lynch established a football management agency, F2 Talent, despite neither being a licensed intermediary with the FA. The agency courted controversy over the use of a photo publicising a newly signed young player, violating the FA's policy to not promote players under the age of 15.

Also in 2018, the duo founded F2 Revolution, an agency aimed at recruiting 'social talent'.

== Other ventures ==
Lynch signed a short-term semi-professional contract with Billericay Town in 2017, playing in the Isthmian Premier League. He registered his first goals for the club on 3 October 2017, scoring Billericay's fifth and sixth goal in a 7–1 win against Hungerford Town in the FA Cup. After being absent from the team for several matches in late 2017, the club revealed on Twitter that it had been agreed with Lynch that his work as part of the F2Freestylers would take priority over playing for Billericay. Billericay went on to win the league, giving Lynch a winner's medal. He played eight total matches.

Lynch also posts short videos to his TikTok account, on which he has a following of over 27.8 million users.

== Publications ==
Wingrove and Lynch have authored the following books published by Bonnier Books Ltd:

- F2 Freestylers (18 November 2016). F2 World of Football: How to Play Like a Pro. Bonnier Books Limited. ISBN 978-1-911-27444-5.
- F2 Freestylers (27 July 2017). F2 Football Academy: Take Your Game to the Next Level. ISBN 978-1-911-60008-4.
- F2 Freestylers (19 October 2017). F2 Galaxy of Football: Attack of the Football Cyborgs. Bonnier Books Limited. ISBN 978-1-911-60000-8.
- F2 Freestylers (31 August 2018). F2 World Class: Football Tips and Tricks For The World Stage. Bonnier Books Limited. ISBN 978-1-788-70026-9.
- F2 Freestylers (17 October 2019). F2 Ultimate Footballer: Pro Footballers Secret Tips Revealed. Bonnier Books Limited. ISBN 978-1-788-70258-4.
