= ChrisMD =

YouTuber and Internet personality from Jersey (born 1996)

- Born: Christopher Michael Dixon; 10 June 1996 (age 30); Jersey, Channel Islands
- Occupation: YouTuber

YouTube information
- Channel: ChrisMD
- Years active: 2010–present
- Genres: Gaming; association football
- Subscribers: 6.34 million
- Views: 1.71 billion
- Last updated: 9 March 2026

Christopher Michael Dixon (born 10 June 1996), better known as ChrisMD, is a YouTuber, Internet personality and amateur football player from Jersey. He produces videos on FIFA gameplay, football, and vlog style content. As of April 2026, his main YouTube channel has over 6.3 million subscribers and 1.713 billion video views. He is the most-subscribed YouTuber from Jersey, Channel Islands.

== Early life ==
Christopher Michael Dixon was born on 10 June 1996 in Jersey, Channel Islands. He grew up in St John, Jersey. He attended Victoria College.

== Career ==
Dixon created his YouTube account, ChrisMD, in July 2010 and started uploading FIFA 12 gameplay content. During his early YouTube years, he predominantly uploaded FIFA pack opening videos, as was popular at the time. However, he set himself apart from other FIFA-centric YouTubers by creating a number of series with bespoke rules across various Ultimate Teams. These included 'Ronaldinho's Recruitment' on FIFA 15 and 'The Ultimate Team' on FIFA 16. In more recent years, his content has branched out from FIFA into more general football and IRL content. These videos often feature a recurring cast of fellow YouTubers W2S, WillNE, and Stephen Tries.

In 2020, Dixon uploaded a video titled "I Trained for 3 Months to Run as Fast as Kylian Mbappé", in which he spent three months training to run as fast as French footballer and then Paris Saint-Germain forward Kylian Mbappé, who is the fastest footballer in the world with a top speed of 36 km/h, according to French newspaper Le Figaro.

In May 2020, Dixon went viral after he uploaded a YouTube video titled "My Cat and I Fooled the World", in which he tricked several news programmes, such as The Late Late Show with James Corden, Good Morning America, and more, into thinking that his cat is a goalkeeper cat. He explained that the reason he made the video was because he wanted to make a point about how much artificial content there is on the social media platform.

In November 2022, Dixon participated in a YouTube video challenge by American YouTuber MrBeast titled "Last To Take Hand Off Jet, Keeps It!".

In April 2023, Dixon appeared in episode 13 of the 2022/23 BBC television quiz show Mastermind as one of the master minds, where his specialist subject were "British Birds of Prey".

In February 2024, Dixon appeared in Sky Sports's Saturday Social programme.

== Other ventures ==
In February 2018, Dixon released a biography titled Thrills, Skills and Molehills: The Beautiful Game?.

In July 2023, Dixon invested in The Fellas Studios, a production company owned by popular YouTubers Callum Airey and Joshua Larkin.

== Charity ==
In July 2019, Dixon donated £3,000 to Jersey Action Against Rape (JAAR), a local charity in Jersey, which supports survivors of rape and sexual assault.

Dixon raised more than £44,000 by playing FIFA for the NHS COVID-19 Urgent Appeal during the COVID-19 pandemic.

=== Charity football matches ===
From 2015–2018 Dixon has participated in all the EE Wembley Cup charity match and tournament held so far. He played for Spencer FC in 2015, Weller Wanderers in 2016, Tekkers Town in 2017 and Hashtag United F.C. in 2018.

Dixon has participated in all the Sidemen Charity Matches held so far, playing on the YouTube Allstars team in every iteration except for the 2022 and 2026 matches, in which he played for Sidemen FC. He has scored exactly one goal in every single match he has partaken in, with the exception of the inaugural event in 2016, where he had a penalty saved in a goalless performance. He is the only non-Sidemen member to have played in every match, a status that became his after Sidemen member TBJZL's brother Manny Brown, who played in the first six matches, did not participate in the 2026 match.

On 2 June 2024, Dixon played in a football charity match held by British YouTube group Beta Squad and American YouTube group AMP at Selhurst Park, London, England. The event raised money for The Water Project. Dixon scored one goal in the 80th minute for Team AMP before the match ended in a 6-6 draw after a pitch invasion forced the game to be called off.

Outside of charity football, Dixon also plays for St. John F.C, his local club based in Jersey, and, in April 2026, signed for Footscray Rangers FC, a club based in Melbourne, Australia, who play in the Victorian State League 7.

== Personal life ==
In 2017, Dixon started dating fellow YouTuber Shannon Langdon. They later broke up in 2023.

He lives in London with fellow YouTubers George Clarke and Arthur Hill.

He is a supporter of Arsenal.

== Filmography ==
Film
Year	Title	Role	Notes	Ref.
2024	The Sidemen Story	Himself	Documentary	

Web
Year	Title	Role	Network	Notes	Ref.
2023	Mastermind	Master Minds	BBC iPlayer	Episode 13	

== Bibliography ==
- Dixon, Christopher (15 February 2018). Thrills, Skills and Molehills: The Beautiful Game?. Penguin Books. ISBN 978-0-241-33535-2.
