= Ben Winston =

British producer & director (born 1981)

The Honourable Ben Winston
- Born: Benjamin Saul Winston; 13 October 1981 (age 45)
- Education: University of Leeds
- Occupations: Producer; director
- Years active: 2007–present
- Spouse: Meredith Winston
- Children: 2
- Relatives: Robert Winston, Baron Winston (father)

Benjamin Saul Winston (born 13 October 1981) is a British producer, director and a founding partner of Fulwell 73. He has won 13 Emmy Awards and been nominated 33 times. He holds the record for the individual with the most Emmy nominations in any one year, when in 2019, he received 8 nominations. Business Insider described him as “the most influential producer in television.”

Winston is the executive producer of The Late Late Show with James Corden, the Grammy Awards, for CBS, The Kardashians for Hulu, Ed Sheeran: The Sum of it All and “Carpool Karaoke” for Apple TV+. He was the executive producer and director of the 2021 Friends: The Reunion special, which became the most viewed show in Sky One and HBO Max’s history. His special Adele One Night Only was the highest rated entertainment show on network television in 2022. Winston is also executive producer of Drop the Mic for TBS, Game On! for CBS and Real Pigeons Fight Crime for Nickelodeon.

He has also created and produced several music specials for artists such as Bruno Mars (CBS), Harry Styles (Apple), Elton John (Disney+), Sam Smith (Apple), Adele, Justin Bieber (ITV), Kacey Musgraves (Amazon), Ben Platt, Gary Barlow and Shawn Mendes (Netflix). He also oversaw Global Citizen: Mandela 100 a 10-hour live broadcast show from South Africa, with Beyoncé and Jay-Z. In addition, he has produced and directed documentaries, videos, and films for the band One Direction, including the Columbia Pictures film, This Is Us.

His executive producing credits include four Brit Awards ceremonies for ITV, two Tony Awards for CBS, the UK version of The X Factor and the recent Christmas special of the sitcom Gavin and Stacey for the BBC, which became the most-watched scripted show since 2003 and won the 2020 BAFTA for TV Moment of the Year. Winston has won an MTV Video Music Award, three Brit Awards for directing, three PGA awards, and five Critics’ Choice Awards. Variety named Winston in their list of top 20 unscripted producers in the world. He was appointed to the board of MGM Resorts in 2023.

== Personal life ==
Winston was born in 1981, the youngest of three children born to Robert Winston, Baron Winston and Lira Helen Feigenbaum, The Lady Winston. He is Jewish, keeps a kosher home and does not drive on Shabbat.

Winston studied at the University College School and then went to University of Leeds, graduating in Broadcasting in 2004. He is married to Meredith Winston. Together, they have two daughters, Ruby (born 5 December 2016) and Grace (born 10 October 2019). Their eldest's godfather is Harry Styles.

Winston is a lifelong supporter of Premier League football club Arsenal and has held a season ticket at the club for over 30 years. On 19 September 2025, Winston joined Arsenal as a non-executive director.

== Career ==
Winston started at Fulwell 73 by co-producing In The Hands of the Gods (Lionsgate) in 2007. Since then, he has produced and directed shows including The Michael McIntyre Chat Show (BBC1) Robbie Williams: One Night at The Palladium (BBC1), This is Justin Bieber (ITV1), One Direction: A Year In The Making, and the seven-hour live streamed show 1D Day. He also produced and directed Gary Barlow: On Her Majesty's Service(2012).

Winston has worked with his friend James Corden on many productions, including James Corden's World Cup Live (ITV1), When Corden Met Barlow (BBC1), When Robbie Met James (Sky One). For Red Nose Day on BBC1, he directed and co-wrote sketches for Gavin & Stacey. He co-directed the 3D documentary movie, JLS: Eyes Wide Open which opened on over 400 screens across the UK. At the time it was the biggest grossing music cinema release of all time in the UK, but was beaten by the next film he produced, One Direction: This Is Us for Columbia Pictures.

As a commercial director, his advert for "A League Of Their Own" won the gold award at Berlin Pro Max Awards in 2011. He directed the 2011 Christmas Campaign for BBC One, "Consider Yourself One of Us" as well as the award-winning campaign for the Sport Relief mile. His music videos for One Direction has won a Brit Award for British Video of the Year for four consecutive years.

In 2014, he directed When Corden Met Barlow which aired on BBC One. The show included a 6-minute 45 second Carpool Karaoke segment in the documentary with singer Gary Barlow of the band Take That. James Corden explained that "Ben Winston and I always thought there was something very joyful about someone very, very famous singing their songs in an ordinary situation. We just had this idea: Los Angeles, traffic, the carpool lane — maybe this is something we could pull off." Later on, Carpool Karaoke was included as a regular featured segment on The Late Late Show with James Corden and other specials. That same year, Winston also became an executive producer on The X Factor.

== Awards ==
Won

- 2016: Primetime Emmy Award for "Outstanding Interactive Program" for The Late Late Show with James Corden co-won with James Corden (producer/host), Rob Crabbe (executive producer) and Adam Abramson (director of digital)
- 2016: Primetime Emmy Award for "Outstanding Variety Special" category for The Late Late Show Carpool Karaoke Primetime Special. Award co-won with Rob Crabbe (executive producer), Mike Gibbons (co-executive producer), Sheila Rogers, Michael Kaplan, Jeff Kopp and Josie Cliff (supervising producers) and James Corden (producer/host).

Nominated

- 2016: Primetime Emmy Award for "Outstanding Variety Talk Series" for The Late Late Show with James Corden co-nominated with Rob Crabbe (executive producer), Mike Gibbons (co-executive producer), Sheila Rogers, Michael Kaplan, Jeff Kopp and Josie Cliff (supervising producers)
- 2017: Primetime Emmy Awards for "Outstanding Writing for a Variety Special" for The 70th Annual Tony Awards (2016). Co-nominated with Dave Boone (writer), Mike Gibbons, Lauren Greenberg, Ian Karmel, Justin Shanes (special materials)
- 2017: PGA Award for "Outstanding Producer of Live Entertainment & Talk Television" for The Late Late Show with James Corden. Co-nomination alongside Rob Crabbe, Mike Gibbons, Amy Ozols, Sheila Rogers, Michael Kaplan, Jeff Kopp, James Longman, Josie Cliff and James Corden

== Filmography ==
Director

- 2011: JLS: Eyes Wide Open 3D (Documentary)
- 2011: James Corden: May I Have Your Attention, Please? (Video short)
- 2011: One Direction: A Year in the Making (TV Movie documentary)
- 2012: Gary Barlow: On Her Majesty's Service (TV Movie documentary)
- 2012: When Robbie Met James (TV special)
- 2014: When Corden Met Barlow (TV special)
- 2021: Friends: The Reunion (TV special)

Producer

- 2007: In the Hands of the Gods (Documentary, producer)
- 2007: Slave Labour (Documentary short, executive producer)
- 2010: This Is JLS (TV special, producer)
- 2011: Brit Awards 2011 (TV special, producer)
- 2011: One Direction: A Year in the Making (TV documentary, producer)
- 2012: A Very JLS Christmas (TV special, executive producer)
- 2012: Freddie Flintoff: Hidden Side of Sport (TV documentary film, associate producer)
- 2012: The Brit Awards 2012 (TV special, producer)
- 2012: Gary Barlow: On Her Majesty's Service (TV documentary, executive producer)
- 2012: Flintoff: From Lord's to the Ring (TV Series, associate producer)
- 2012: When Robbie Met James (TV special, executive producer)
- 2013: The Brit Awards 2013 (TV Special, producer)
- 2013: One Direction: This Is Us (Documentary, producer)
- 2013: The Class of '92 (Documentary, associate producer)
- 2013: Robbie Williams One Night at the Palladium (TV special, executive producer)
- 2014: Gary Barlow Big Ben Bash Live (TV special, executive producer)
- 2014: The Brit Awards 2014 (TV Special, producer)
- 2014: The Michael McIntyre Chat Show (TV Mini-Series, executive producer for several episodes)
- 2014: The X Factor UK (executive producer)
- 2014: When Corden Met Barlow (TV special, executive producer)
- 2014: The Guvnors (associate producer)
- 2014: One Direction: Where We Are – The Concert Film (Documentary, executive producer)
- 2015: American Express Unstaged: Disclosure (Short, executive producer)
- 2015: One Direction the London Sessions (TV special documentary, executive producer)
- 2015: Take That: These Days on Tour (TV special documentary, associate producer)
- 2015–2023: The Late Late Show with James Corden (TV Series, executive producer)
- 2016: Jimmy Carr: Funny Business (Video documentary, associate producer)
- 2016: The 70th Annual Tony Awards (TV Special, producer)
- 2017: Carpool Karaoke (TV Series, executive producer)
- 2017: 59th Annual Grammy Awards (TV Special, producer)
- 2017: Harry Styles: Behind the Album (Documentary, executive producer)
- 2017: Forbidden Games: The Justin Fashanu Story (Documentary, associate producer)
- 2018: Bruno Mars: 24K Magic Live at the Apollo (co-executive producer)
- 2018: 60th Annual Grammy Awards (TV Special, producer)
- 2019: 61st Annual Grammy Awards (TV Special, executive producer)
- 2019: The 73rd Annual Tony Awards (TV Special, producer)
- 2019: The Kacey Musgraves Christmas Show (TV Special, executive producer)
- 2020: 62nd Annual Grammy Awards (TV Special, executive producer)
- 2020: Ben Platt Live from Radio City Music Hall (TV Special, executive producer)
- 2020: Shawn Mendes: In Wonder (Documentary, producer)
- 2021: 63rd Annual Grammy Awards (TV Special, executive producer)
- 2021: Adele One Night Only (CBS special, executive producer)
- 2021: An Audience With Adele (ITV special, executive producer)
- 2022: The Kardashians (TV series, executive producer)
- 2026: FIFA World Cup on FOX After Hours with James Corden (TV series, executive producer)
