= The Kacey Musgraves Christmas Show =

- Directed by: Chris Howe
- Starring: Kacey Musgraves; Dan Levy; Troye Sivan; Fred Armisen; Kendall Jenner; Camila Cabello; Lana Del Rey; Leon Bridges; James Corden; Zooey Deschanel; Radio City Rockettes
- Country of origin: United States
- Original language: English

Production
- Producers: Kacey Musgraves; Ben Winston; Fulwell 73 Productions; Jason Owen; Emma Conway; Jake Ryan
- Running time: 45 minutes
- Production company: Amazon Studios

Original release
- Network: Amazon Prime Video
- Release: November 28, 2019

The Kacey Musgraves Christmas Show is a 2019 musical Christmas television special directed by Chris Howe and produced for Amazon Prime Video. The special stars country music singer Kacey Musgraves as she prepares for a Christmas party, alongside an array of celebrity guests including Dan Levy, Troye Sivan, Fred Armisen, Kendall Jenner, Camila Cabello, Lana Del Rey, Leon Bridges, James Corden, Zooey Deschanel, and the Radio City Rockettes.

== Synopsis ==
The "Wes Anderson-inspired reimagining of the holidays" features a mix of original songs featured on the 2016 album A Very Kacey Christmas, as well as new versions of holiday classics as duets with celebrity guests. Actor and writer Dan Levy narrates Musgraves' holiday preparations, as she struggles to find her nana's Christmas tree star.

== Reception ==
The special has a 67% positive rating on review aggregate site Rotten Tomatoes based on six reviews. Ellen Johnson of Paste called the special "campy holiday fun" and praised its musical performances, Musgraves' costumes, and its emotional resonance. Cat Zhang of Pitchfork had a more mixed reaction, criticizing its inconsistent tone and Musgraves' banter, but ultimately concluded that her "sincerity and magnetic calm" saved the special.

== Soundtrack ==
The show's official soundtrack was released to digital retailers on the same day of the special's release through MCA Nashville.
