= FIFA World Cup on Fox After Hours with James Corden =

American late-night television program

- Official logo
- Genre: Sports commentary; Comedy; Talk show
- Directed by: Tim Mancinelli
- Presented by: James Corden; Rio Ferdinand; Ian Karmel
- Opening theme: "Run Kid" by Arkayla
- Country of origin: United States
- Original language: English
- No. of seasons: 1
- No. of episodes: 26

Production
- Executive producers: Eric Shanks; Brad Zager; Ben Winston; Gabe Turner; James Longman; Eric Pankowski
- Production locations: Fox Studio Lot, Los Angeles, California
- Running time: 60 minutes
- Production companies: Fulwell Entertainment; Jolly Octopus Media; Fox Sports

Original release
- Network: Fox
- Release: June 11 – July 19, 2026

Related
- The Late Late Show with James Corden; James Corden's World Cup Live

FIFA World Cup on Fox After Hours with James Corden is an American late-night sports and comedy talk show broadcast by Fox. Hosted by James Corden with former footballer Rio Ferdinand and comedian Ian Karmel, it served as a companion program to Fox Sports' coverage of the 2026 FIFA World Cup.

The limited-run series premiered on June 11, 2026, the opening day of the tournament. Airing live on selected game nights, it combined discussion and highlights of the day's matches with comedy segments, interviews and appearances by footballers and entertainment personalities. Its final episode aired following the 2026 FIFA World Cup final on July 19, 2026.

== Format ==
The program reviews the day's World Cup matches and other developments from the tournament, interspersed with comedy sketches, audience games, field pieces and interviews with footballers and celebrity guests.

Corden described the concept as a lighthearted discussion of the day's games and incidents, intended to recreate the atmosphere of meeting friends in a bar after the matches. He is joined by Ferdinand, a former captain of the England national football team, and Karmel, a former co-head writer and on-air contributor on The Late Late Show with James Corden.

Ferdinand was occasionally replaced by guest co-hosts, including Zlatan Ibrahimović, Thierry Henry, Alex Scott, Clarence Seedorf and Cobi Jones.

== Production ==
Fox announced the program during its upfront presentation on May 11, 2026. It marked Corden's return to American late-night television three years after the conclusion of The Late Late Show with James Corden, which he hosted on CBS from 2015 to 2023.

Corden had previously hosted James Corden's World Cup Live, a comedy companion program produced for ITV during the 2010 FIFA World Cup. He said that Fox's ownership of the American television rights allowed the new program to show and discuss footage from the tournament directly, rather than merely referring viewers to another broadcaster.

The series originated from the Fox Studio Lot in Los Angeles and was produced by Fulwell Entertainment and Jolly Octopus Media in association with Fox Sports. Eric Shanks, Brad Zager, Ben Winston, Gabe Turner, James Longman and Eric Pankowski served as executive producers.

Winston, Longman and Pankowski had previously worked with Corden on The Late Late Show, as had Karmel. Director Tim Mancinelli and other members of the production staff also came from Corden's earlier program.

== Broadcast ==
The series premiered on June 11, 2026, and aired live in the Eastern time zone, with delayed broadcasts in some other regions. Most episodes began around midnight Eastern Time, although scheduling varied according to Fox's World Cup coverage and other programming. Start times ranged from 11:00 p.m. to 1:30 a.m.

The series was scheduled as a temporary World Cup companion rather than an ongoing addition to Fox's late-night lineup. Episodes that directly followed World Cup matches generally received larger audiences than those broadcast several hours after Fox's tournament coverage ended.

== Episodes ==
Episodes beginning after midnight are listed under the preceding evening's television broadcast date.

| No. | Guest(s) | Scheduled start (EDT) | Original release date |
|---|---|---|---|
| 1 | Mila Kunis | 12:00 a.m. | June 11, 2026 |
| 2 | Sebastian Maniscalco and Leandro Bacuna | 12:00 a.m. | June 12, 2026 |
| 3 | Alexi Lalas and Antonee Robinson | 12:00 a.m. | June 14, 2026 |
| 4 | Zlatan Ibrahimović (guest co-host), Pico Lopes, and Maz Jobrani | 12:00 a.m. | June 15, 2026 |
| 5 | Tim Ream and Javier Hernández | 12:00 a.m. | June 17, 2026 |
| 6 | Noah Beck, Duckens Nazon, Wilson Isidor, Frantzdy Pierrot, and Jason Derulo | 12:00 a.m. | June 18, 2026 |
| 7 | Thierry Henry (guest co-host), Michael Peña, and Alex Freeman | 12:00 a.m. | June 21, 2026 |
| 8 | Eloy Room and Anthony Anderson | 12:00 a.m. | June 23, 2026 |
| 9 | Virgil van Dijk, Rebecca Lowe, and Brendan Hunt | 12:00 a.m. | June 24, 2026 |
| 10 | Marcus Holmgren Pedersen and Alex Edelman | 1:30 a.m. | June 25, 2026 |
| 11 | Folarin Balogun and Stephen Amell | 12:00 a.m. | June 28, 2026 |
| 12 | Tiffany Haddish | 12:00 a.m. | June 29, 2026 |
| 13 | Colin Farrell, Vozinha, and Pico Lopes | 12:00 a.m. | June 30, 2026 |
| 14 | Alex Scott (guest co-host), Rob Lowe, and Declan Rice | 12:00 a.m. | July 1, 2026 |
| 15 | Weston McKennie, Ray Romano, and Declan Rice | 1:00 a.m. | July 3, 2026 |
| 16 | Whitney Cummings | 12:00 a.m. | July 4, 2026 |
| 17 | Robbie Keane and Melissa Villaseñor | 12:00 a.m. | July 5, 2026 |
| 18 | Cobi Jones and Eugenio Derbez | 12:00 a.m. | July 6, 2026 |
| 19 | Sophie Cunningham and Ørjan Nyland | 11:00 p.m. | July 7, 2026 |
| 20 | Jack Whitehall | 11:00 p.m. | July 9, 2026 |
| 21 | Clarence Seedorf (guest co-host) and Eric Winter | 11:00 p.m. | July 10, 2026 |
| 22 | Fortune Feimster | 12:30 a.m. | July 11, 2026 |
| 23 | Jordan Henderson, Anthony Gordon, and Rob Delaney | 12:00 a.m. | July 14, 2026 |
| 24 | Cobi Jones (guest co-host) and Matt Rife | 11:00 p.m. | July 15, 2026 |
| 25 | Bryan Cranston | 12:00 a.m. | July 18, 2026 |
| 26 | Prince Harry, Duke of Sussex | 11:00 p.m. | July 19, 2026 |

== Reception ==
=== Critical response ===
Reviewing the premiere for LateNighter, veteran television reporter Bill Carter described it as a lighthearted program with good energy and a loose, “shaggy charm”. He wrote that Corden's familiarity with football and experience in live late-night television helped the format, and considered the show most successful when it avoided excessive structure.

The program also attracted coverage for several unscripted and deliberately irreverent moments. During a Fox pre-match promotion, analyst Alexi Lalas called Corden a “full-kit wanker”, surprising British presenter Rebecca Lowe, who noted that the expression carries a stronger connotation in Britain than in the United States.

Other widely reported segments included actor Colin Farrell inadvertently swearing during a live interview and an audience game entitled “Nuts or Butts”, in which contestants predicted whether footballs in paused match footage would strike players in the groin or backside.

=== Ratings ===
The premiere averaged 418,000 viewers and 110,000 adults aged 18–49 in Nielsen Live+Same Day ratings. During the midnight-to-1:00 a.m. period, it trailed the competing programming on ABC, NBC and CBS in total viewers, but exceeded CBS and came close to NBC among adults aged 18–49.

Through its first 16 episodes, the program averaged 639,000 viewers and 206,000 adults aged 18–49 in Live+3 ratings. Its two largest audiences during that period came on June 29 and 30, when it aired immediately following World Cup matches on Fox. Those episodes drew 1.237 million and 1.224 million viewers, respectively, including 452,000 and 469,000 adults aged 18–49.

Across the 13 original episodes included in the second quarter of 2026, the program averaged 632,000 viewers and 201,000 adults aged 18–49.

== See also ==
- 2026 FIFA World Cup broadcasting rights
