= Drop the Mic =

American musical reality competition television series

- Genre: Reality competition
- Created by: James Corden
- Presented by: Method Man; Hailey Bieber
- Composer: Joshua Silverstein
- Country of origin: United States
- Original language: English
- No. of seasons: 3
- No. of episodes: 31

Production
- Executive producers: James Corden; Jensen Karp; Ben Winston; Joanna Gallagher
- Camera setup: Multiple-camera setup
- Running time: 23 minutes
- Production companies: Fulwell 73; CBS Television Studios

Original release
- Network: TBS (seasons 1–2); TNT (season 3)
- Release: October 24, 2017 – March 27, 2019

Mic the Drop is an American musical reality competition television series that premiered on October 24, 2017, airing on TBS for its first two seasons before moving to TNT for its third season on January 23, 2019. The show is based on a recurring segment on The Late Late Show with James Corden.

== Overview ==
The show is a spin-off of a segment that was first introduced on The Late Late Show with James Corden. The series was announced on August 11, 2016, with a 2017 premiere. It was also confirmed that Corden would not be involved in an on-camera capacity, and a host would be announced at a later date. Corden serves as executive producer with his CBS late-night partner, Ben Winston and Jensen Karp.

Drop the Mic debuted on American cable network TBS on October 24, 2017. It is hosted by rapper and actor Method Man and model and television personality Hailey Bieber, with Joshua Silverstein providing original beats for each rap battle, while writers from The Late Late Show provide the lyrics.

On January 11, 2018, the show was renewed for a second season, which premiered on April 15.

On December 20, 2018, it was announced on its Twitter account that the series would be moving to TBS' sister network TNT on January 23, 2019. TBS would continue to air the series in reruns the following night.

On February 21, 2019, TNT announced that an upcoming episode featuring Empire star Jussie Smollett would be pulled from the current season and put on hold following Smollett's arrest. The episode also featured Danielle Brooks, Clay Aiken and Ian Ziering. However, the rap battle between Aiken and Ziering was released on social media.

== Seasons ==
Season	Episodes	Originally released	
Season	Episodes	First released	Last released
1	11	October 24, 2017	January 9, 2018
2	10	April 15, 2018	June 17, 2018
3	10	January 23, 2019	March 27, 2019

== Episodes ==
Note: Winners are listed in bold

=== Season 1 (2017–18) ===
No. overall	No. in season	Title	Original release date	U.S. viewers (millions)
1	1	"**Halle Berry** vs. James Corden / Anthony Anderson vs. **Usher**"	October 24, 2017	0.96
Talk show host James Corden takes on actor Halle Berry; singer Usher faces actor Anthony Anderson in a lyrical duel.
2	2	"James Van Der Beek vs. **Randall Park** / **Gina Rodriguez** vs. Rob Gronkowski"	October 31, 2017	0.63
Dawson's Creek heartthrob James Van Der Beek throws shade at Fresh Off the Boat's Randall Park; NFL tight end and Super Bowl champion Rob Gronkowski finds out actor Gina Rodriguez might just be a problem he can't tackle.
3	3	"**Niecy Nash** vs. Cedric the Entertainer / **Liam Payne** vs. Jason Derulo"	November 7, 2017	0.70
Actor Niecy Nash (Claws) faces Cedric the Entertainer; music industry giants Jason Derulo and One Direction's Liam Payne rap battle.
4	4	"**Tony Hale** vs. Timothy Simons / Rascal Flatts vs. **Boyz II Men**"	November 14, 2017	0.72
Veep co-stars Tony Hale and Timothy Simons face off in a very personal verbal competition; Boyz II Men clashes with Rascal Flatts in a rap battle never before possible.
5	5	"**Nicole Scherzinger** vs. Lil Rel Howery / **Charlie Puth** vs. Backstreet Boys"	November 21, 2017	0.53
TV host and Pussycat Doll Nicole Scherzinger spits hot fire against Get Out funnyman Lil Rel Howery; an unprecedented 5-on-1 takes place when singer Charlie Puth takes on every single member of the Backstreet Boys.
6	6	"**Vanessa Hudgens** vs. Michael Bennett / James Corden vs. **Nicole Richie**"	November 28, 2017	0.78
NFL superstar Michael Bennett meets his microphone match with Vanessa Hudgens, while talk show host James Corden faces off against fashionista Nicole Richie in a night of unforgettable rap battles.
7	7	"**Mayim Bialik** vs. Kunal Nayyar / **Ashley Tisdale** vs. Nick Lachey"	December 5, 2017	0.72
A Big Bang Theory rap battle has co-stars Mayim Bialik and Kunal Nayyar go rhyme for rhyme; High School Musical princess Ashley Tisdale challenges singer Nick Lachey.
8	8	"**Wayne Brady** vs. Jake Owen / **Kenny G** vs. Richard Marx"	December 12, 2017	0.62
Wayne Brady, known for being quick on his feet, takes on country singer Jake Owen; Kenny G and Richard Marx engage in a rap battle.
9	9	"David Arquette vs. **Brian Tyree Henry** / Jesse Tyler Ferguson vs. **Chrissy Metz**"	December 19, 2017	0.61
David Arquette puts his rap skills to the test against Brian Tyree Henry (Atlanta); Jesse Tyler Ferguson (Modern Family) raps for the first time in a battle against Chrissy Metz (This Is Us).
10	10	"Pentatonix vs. **Bell Biv DeVoe** / **Padma Lakshmi** vs. Randy Jackson"	December 26, 2017	0.81
Grammy winners Pentatonix lyrically battle '90s pioneers Bell Biv Devoe; Top Chef’s Padma Lakshmi and American Idol’s Randy Jackson see which host has the hottest bars.
11	11	"**Danielle Fishel** vs. Jonathan Lipnicki / **Shania Twain** vs. **Meghan Trainor**"	January 9, 2018	0.99
Finding the true '90s American Sweetheart when Boy Meets World girl-next-door Danielle Fishel faces Jonathan Lipnicki of Jerry Maguire; legend Shania Twain and emerging pop star Meghan Trainor engage in a battle of the divas.

=== Season 2 (2018) ===
No. overall	No. in season	Title	Original release date	U.S. viewers (millions)
12	1	"Shaquille O'Neal vs. **Ken Jeong** / **Jerry Springer** vs. Ricki Lake"	April 15, 2018	0.78
A David and Goliath match as Shaquille O' Neal trades barbs with comic Ken Jeong; seeing which talk-show host can really work the mic when Ricki Lake goes head-to-head with Jerry Springer.
13	2	"Odell Beckham Jr. vs. **Shawn Mendes** / **Molly Ringwald** vs. Jon Cryer"	April 22, 2018	0.64
Pop sensation Shawn Mendes tries to stop the forward progress of football star Odell Beckham Jr. when it comes to lyrical warfare; Pretty in Pink co-stars Molly Ringwald and Jon Cryer spit Brat Pack bars to see who will reign supreme.
14	3	"Seth Rogen vs. **Joseph Gordon-Levitt** / **Terry Crews** vs. Luis Fonsi"	April 29, 2018	0.68
Two pals put their friendship on the line when Seth Rogen and Joseph Gordon-Levitt take it too far in a rap battle; funnyman Terry Crews squares up against the internet's most watched musician, Despacito singer Luis Fonsi.
15	4	"**Marlon Wayans** vs. Jay Pharoah / Lindsey Vonn vs. **Gus Kenworthy**"	May 6, 2018	0.60
Marlon Wayans battles Jay Pharoah in a war that cannot be erased; an All-American showdown between Lindsey Vonn and Gus Kenworthy will leave only one rapper on the slopes.
16	5	"Darren Criss vs. **Gaten Matarazzo** / **Chandler Riggs** vs. Chad Coleman"	May 13, 2018	0.57
The cuteness is undeniable when American Crime Story star Darren Criss faces Stranger Things star Gaten Matarazzo; two former The Walking Dead stars, Chandler Riggs and Chad Coleman, rise from the ashes to spar.
17	6	"**Taye Diggs** vs. Karrueche Tran / **Jodie Sweetin** vs. Mark McGrath"	May 20, 2018	0.50
Taye Diggs and Karrueche Tran spill all the tea when they go head-to-head; singer Mark McGrath tries to catch Jodie Sweetin slipping, but may just be shocked at the talent she's been hiding.
18	7	"Hanson vs. **Sam Richardson** / Shaggy vs. **Matthew Lillard**"	May 27, 2018	0.40
The lovable brothers of Hanson enter the savage battlegrounds to face Veep's hilarious Sam Richardson; Scooby-Doo alum and current voice of Shaggy Rogers, Matthew Lillard, is the underdog when paired against musician Shaggy.
19	8	"**Michael K. Williams** vs. Trevor Jackson / James Corden vs. **Dr. Phil McGraw**"	June 3, 2018	0.53
Michael K. Williams battles Trevor Jackson; James Corden puts his losing streak on the line against a man whose name is synonymous with rap battles: Dr. Phil.
20	9	"WWE Superstars vs. **GLOW** / **Laila Ali** vs. Chris Jericho"	June 10, 2018	0.64
WWE Superstars Nikki & Brie Bella, Alicia Fox and Carmella face the stars of GLOW, Kate Nash, Jackie Tohn, Britney Young and Sunita Mani; Chris Jericho has his hands full with undefeated knockout queen, Laila Ali.
21	10	"Luis Guzmán vs. **Gabriel Iglesias** / Tove Lo vs. **Charli XCX**"	June 17, 2018	0.58
Actor Luis Guzmán competes against funnyman Gabriel "Fluffy" Iglesias; Singer-songwriters Charli XCX and Tove Lo jeopardize their friendship by facing each other.

=== Season 3 (2019) ===
No. overall	No. in season	Title	Original release date	U.S. viewers (millions)
22	1	"**Taran Killam** vs. Rob Riggle / Boy George vs. **Laverne Cox**"	January 23, 2019	0.36
SNL alums Taran Killam and Rob Riggle face off in an epic battle; LGBTQ icons past and present collide as Culture Club’s Boy George faces off with Orange Is the New Black star Laverne Cox.
23	2	"Kermit the Frog & Pepé vs. **Miss Piggy & Beaker** / **Daniel Dae Kim** vs. Josh Holloway vs. Harold Perrineau"	January 30, 2019	0.39
Kermit and Pepe go up against Miss Piggy and Beaker in the greatest (and only) Muppet rap battle of all time; Three castaways from Lost, Daniel Dae Kim, Josh Holloway and Harold Perrineau, have a not-so-friendly mainland reunion.
24	3	"**Kat Graham** vs Shameik Moore / **Nikki Glaser** vs. Brad Williams"	February 6, 2019	0.30
The Vampire Diaries star Kat Graham takes a bite out of Shameik Moore; a standup standoff with two comedy giants, Nikki Glaser and Brad Williams.
25	4	"Lonzo Ball vs. **T-Pain** / **Kevin Smith** vs. Jason Mewes"	February 13, 2019	0.42
Basketball star Lonzo ball tries to dunk on the king of auto-tune, T-pain; friends becomes foes as a slimmed-down Kevin Smith goes head to head with Jason Mewes; Jay and Silent Bob will never be the same.
26	5	"Mike Colter vs. **Ne-Yo** / **Christina Milian** vs. Ashlee Simpson"	February 20, 2019	0.32
R&B singer Ne-Yo battles Mike Colter to see if he's as tough as Luke Cage; It's a pop star party when Christina Milian and Ashlee Simpson see which voice can deal more pain.
27	6	"Jack Osbourne vs. **Kelly Osbourne** / Mel B vs. **La La Anthony**"	February 27, 2019	0.48
Leaving Universal Orlando Resort with a bang, Jack and Kelly Osbourne take sibling rivalry to the next level in a family feud rap battle; Spice Girl Mel B spars with La La Anthony when there's only room for one diva on stage.
28	7	"Ron Funches vs. **Raven-Symoné** / Joey Fatone vs. **Joey McIntyre**"	March 6, 2019	0.39
Funnyman Ron Funches spits hot fire against Raven-Symoné, who may look harmless, but is a beast with the microphone. Then it's a battle of boy band legends with N*Sync's Joey Fatone and NKOTB's Joey McIntyre pushing their friendship aside to go one-on-one in our ring of rhymes.
29	8	"Jason Mitchell vs. **Adina Porter** / **David Faustino** vs. Joey Lawrence"	March 13, 2019	0.33
Jason Mitchell (Straight Outta Compton) channels Eazy-E against Adina Porter (American Horror Story) and 90's TV teens David Faustino (Married... with Children) and Joey Lawrence (Blossom) battle it out.
30	9	"Mark Cuban vs. **Rusev & Lana** / The New Day vs. **SWV**"	March 20, 2019	N/A
Wrestling superstars Rusev and Lana hunt shark Mark Cuban to see who's the baddest beast. Then, tag team champs The New Day jump in the ring with iconic soul singers SWV in a no-holds-barred grudge match.
31	10	"**Amber Riley, Harry Shum Jr. and Becca Tobin** vs. Kevin McHale, Jenna Ushkowitz and Heather Morris / **Jason Biggs** vs. Eddie Kaye Thomas"	March 27, 2019	0.33
Glee stars Amber Riley, Harry Shum Jr., and Becca Tobin battle former castmates Kevin McHale, Jenna Ushkowitz, and Heather Morris; American Pie stars Jason Biggs and Eddie Kaye Thomas battle on the mic and serve up slices of lyrical hurt.

== Reception ==
=== Ratings ===
==== Season 1 (2017–18) ====
Viewership and ratings per episode of Drop the Mic
No.	Title	Air date	Rating/share (18–49)	Viewers (millions)
1	"Halle Berry vs. James Corden / Anthony Anderson vs. Usher"	October 24, 2017	0.42	0.955
2	"James Van Der Beek vs. Randall Park / Gina Rodriguez vs. Rob Gronkowski"	October 31, 2017	0.30	0.634
3	"Niecy Nash vs. Cedric the Entertainer / Liam Payne vs. Jason Derulo"	November 7, 2017	0.30	0.700
4	"Tony Hale vs. Timothy Simons / Rascal Flatts vs. Boyz II Men"	November 14, 2017	0.30	0.718
5	"Nicole Scherzinger vs. Lil Rel Howery / Charlie Puth vs. Backstreet Boys"	November 21, 2017	0.24	0.532
6	"Vanessa Hudgens vs. Michael Bennett / James Corden vs. Nicole Richie"	November 28, 2017	0.36	0.784
7	"Mayim Bialik vs. Kunal Nayyar / Ashley Tisdale vs. Nick Lachey"	December 5, 2017	0.35	0.718
8	"Wayne Brady vs. Jake Owen / Kenny G vs. Richard Marx"	December 12, 2017	0.30	0.620
9	"David Arquette vs. Brian Tyree Henry / Jesse Tyler Ferguson vs. Chrissy Metz"	December 19, 2017	0.26	0.605
10	"Pentatonix vs. Bell Biv DeVoe / Padma Lakshmi vs. Randy Jackson"	December 26, 2017	0.34	0.811
11	"Danielle Fishel vs. Jonathan Lipnicki / Shania Twain vs. Meghan Trainor"	January 9, 2018	0.34	0.994

==== Season 2 (2018) ====
Viewership and ratings per episode of Drop the Mic
No.	Title	Air date	Rating/share (18–49)	Viewers (millions)
1	"Shaquille O'Neal vs. Ken Jeong / Jerry Springer vs. Ricki Lake"	April 15, 2018	0.33	0.779
2	"Odell Beckham Jr. vs. Shawn Mendes / Molly Ringwald vs. Jon Cryer"	April 22, 2018	0.23	0.643
3	"Seth Rogen vs. Joseph Gordon-Levitt / Terry Crews vs. Luis Fonsi"	April 29, 2018	0.28	0.684
4	"Marlon Wayans vs. Jay Pharoah / Lindsey Vonn vs. Gus Kenworthy"	May 6, 2018	0.25	0.598
5	"Darren Criss vs. Gaten Matarazzo / Chandler Riggs vs. Chad Coleman"	May 13, 2018	0.23	0.574
6	"Taye Diggs vs. Karrueche Tran / Jodie Sweetin vs. Mark McGrath"	May 20, 2018	0.20	0.498
7	"Hanson vs. Sam Richardson / Shaggy vs. Matthew Lillard"	May 27, 2018	0.15	0.400
8	"Michael K. Williams vs. Trevor Jackson / James Corden vs. Dr. Phil McGraw"	June 3, 2018	0.19	0.527
9	"WWE Superstars vs. GLOW / Laila Ali vs. Chris Jericho"	June 10, 2018	0.27	0.638
10	"Luis Guzmán vs. Gabriel Iglesias / Tove Lo vs. Charli XCX"	June 17, 2018	0.25	0.578

=== Accolades ===
Year	Award	Category	Nominee	Result	Ref.
2018	Teen Choice Awards	Choice TV Personality	Hailey Bieber	Nominated	

== See also ==
- The Late Late Show with James Corden
