= Gabe Turner =

British filmmaker & producer (born 1980)

- Born: Gabe Jeremy Simon Turner; 21 December 1980 (age 45); London, United Kingdom
- Occupations: Businessman; Film Director; Film Producer; Executive
- Organization: Fulwell 73
- Spouse: Lauren Gold (m. 2011)

Gabriel Jeremy Simon Turner (born 21 December 1980) is a British businessman, film director and executive producer, known for directing the documentary films In The Hands of The Gods, The Class of '92, and I Am Bolt. He is a founding partner of Fulwell 73, a production company.

== Career ==
In 2007, he directed his first documentary In the Hands of the Gods with his brother Ben Turner. In 2013, he directed the documentary film The Class of '92, about six Manchester United players: David Beckham, Nicky Butt, Ryan Giggs, Gary Neville, Phil Neville and Paul Scholes. In 2014, Turner wrote and directed his first scripted feature film, The Guvnors, which won two National Film Awards. In 2015, Turner was attached to a documentary on Usain Bolt, following the Rio Olympics in 2016. In addition, Turner made music videos for One Direction, Demi Lovato, Harry Styles, and Olly Murs.
