= List of The Late Late Show with James Corden episodes =

This is the list of episodes for The Late Late Show with James Corden. A total of episodes have aired.
