= The Kardashians =

2022 American reality TV series

- Genre: Reality television
- Starring: Kim Kardashian; Kourtney Kardashian; Khloé Kardashian; Kendall Jenner; Kylie Jenner; Kris Jenner
- Country of origin: United States
- Original language: English
- No. of seasons: 8
- No. of episodes: 77 + 1 (Special)

Production
- Executive producers: Kris Jenner; Kim Kardashian; Kourtney Kardashian; Khloé Kardashian; Kendall Jenner; Kylie Jenner; Ryan Seacrest; Ben Winston; Danielle King; Emma Conway; Elizabeth Jones
- Production companies: Fulwell Entertainment; Kardashian Jenner Productions

Original release
- Network: Hulu
- Release: April 14, 2022 – present

Related
- Keeping Up with the Kardashians

The Kardashians is an American reality television series focusing on the personal lives of the Kardashian family. The program is a retooled continuation of their previous reality show, Keeping Up with the Kardashians, which concluded in 2021 after a 20-season run, on E!.

The series focuses on sisters Kourtney, Kim, and Khloé Kardashian and their half-sisters, Kendall and Kylie Jenner, alongside their mother, Kris Jenner. It has also featured some of their current and former partners across the seasons including Travis Barker, Tristan Thompson, Scott Disick, Corey Gamble, Kanye West, Lamar Odom and Caitlyn Jenner. Guest appearances by their friends and celebrities happen occasionally.

The Kardashians premiered on April 14, 2022, on the streaming service Hulu; its first season consisted of 10 episodes. Before the series debuted, it was greenlit by Hulu for a multi-season launch with a total of forty episodes. All of the seasons consisted of ten episodes each; the first four premiered bi-annually. The second season premiered in September 2022, followed by the third and fourth seasons in May and September 2023, and the fifth season in May 2024. The Kardashians was renewed for a sixth and seventh season in July 2024; which premiered in February and October 2025 respectively.

== Cast ==
Cast member	Seasons							
Cast member	1	2	3	4	5	6	7	8
Main
Kris Jenner	Main	Main	Main	Main	Main	Main	Main	Main
Kourtney Kardashian	Main	Main	Main	Main	Main	Main	Main	Main
Kim Kardashian	Main	Main	Main	Main	Main	Main	Main	Main
Khloé Kardashian	Main	Main	Main	Main	Main	Main	Main	Main
Kendall Jenner	Main	Main	Main	Main	Main	Main	Main	Main
Kylie Jenner	Main	Main	Main	Main	Main	Main	Main	Main
Recurring
Chris Appleton	Recurring			Recurring	Recurring	Recurring	Recurring	
Travis Barker	Recurring	Recurring	Recurring	Recurring	Recurring	Recurring	Recurring	
Penelope Disick	Recurring			Guest	Recurring	Recurring		
Scott Disick	Recurring		Guest	Recurring	Recurring	Recurring	Recurring	
Corey Gamble	Recurring	Guest	Guest	Recurring	Recurring	Recurring	Recurring	
Tristan Thompson	Recurring	Guest	Guest	Recurring	Guest			
North West	Recurring		Guest	Recurring	Recurring	Recurring		
Malika Haqq	Recurring	Guest	Guest	Recurring	Recurring	Recurring	Recurring	
True Thompson	Guest	Guest	Guest	Recurring	Recurring	Recurring		
Saint West	Guest			Recurring	Recurring	Recurring		
Guests
Kanye West	Guest					Guest		
Pete Davidson	Guest	Guest						
Rob Kardashian			Guest	Guest	Guest	Guest	Guest	
Kathy Hilton			Guest	Guest	Guest	Guest		
Faye Resnick					Guest			
Lamar Odom						Guest		
Caitlyn Jenner							Guest	

== Episodes ==
=== Series overview ===
Season	Episodes	Originally released	
Season	Episodes	First released	Last released
1	10	April 14, 2022	June 16, 2022
2	10	September 22, 2022	November 24, 2022
3	10	May 25, 2023	July 27, 2023
4	10	September 28, 2023	November 30, 2023
5	10	May 23, 2024	July 25, 2024
6	10	February 6, 2025	April 10, 2025
7	10	October 23, 2025	December 25, 2025
8	10	October 8, 2026	December 10, 2026

=== Season 1 (2022) ===
No. overall	No. in season	Title	Original release date
1	1	"Burn Them All to the F*cking Ground"	April 14, 2022
2	2	"Did Somebody Tape That?"	April 21, 2022
3	3	"Live from New York"	April 28, 2022
4	4	"We're Celebrating Sex"	May 5, 2022
5	5	"Who is Kim K?"	May 12, 2022
6	6	"This is a Life or Death Situation"	May 19, 2022
7	7	"Where I've Been and Where I Wanna Go"	May 26, 2022
8	8	"Never Go Against the Family"	June 2, 2022
9	9	"Bucket List Goals"	June 9, 2022
10	10	"Enough Is Enough"	June 16, 2022

=== Season 2 (2022) ===
No. overall	No. in season	Title	Original release date
11	1	"I Have Something to Tell You..."	September 22, 2022
12	2	"Prada You!"	September 29, 2022
13	3	"Life Can Change on a Dime"	October 6, 2022
14	4	"We're Built for This"	October 13, 2022
15	5	"One Night in Miami"	October 20, 2022
16	6	"You Have No Idea How Iconic This Is!"	October 27, 2022
17	7	"What's More American than Marilyn Monroe?"	November 3, 2022
18	8	"I Never Thought I'd See the Day"	November 10, 2022
19	9	"It's Met Monday!"	November 17, 2022
20	10	"Here's to Paris"	November 24, 2022

=== Season 3 (2023) ===
No. overall	No. in season	Title	Original release date
21	1	"Can Everyone Get Their Sh*t Together?"	May 25, 2023
22	2	"Don't Want It, Don't Need It, I'm Done."	June 1, 2023
23	3	"Everything is My Fault!"	June 8, 2023
24	4	"Ciao, Kim"	June 15, 2023
25	5	"You Think I Need Your Permission?"	June 22, 2023
26	6	"The Tension is Brewing"	June 29, 2023
27	7	"Deeper Than Dolce"	July 6, 2023
28	8	"I Have Some Very Important News"	July 13, 2023
29	9	"Feel, Deal, Heal"	July 20, 2023
30	10	"What Just Happened?"	July 27, 2023

=== Season 4 (2023) ===
No. overall	No. in season	Title	Original release date
31	1	"You're a Witch and I Hate You"	September 28, 2023
32	2	"When Is Being Me Gonna Be Okay?"	October 5, 2023
33	3	"A Step in the Right Direction"	October 12, 2023
34	4	"London Here We Come"	October 19, 2023
35	5	"It Takes a Village"	October 26, 2023
36	6	"You're Spiraling"	November 2, 2023
37	7	"A Short-Term Fight"	November 9, 2023
38	8	"Not Forgotten, Not Forgiven"	November 16, 2023
39	9	"You Have Ruined Our Family"	November 23, 2023
40	10	"Buckle Up and Let's Go"	November 30, 2023

=== Season 5 (2024) ===
No. overall	No. in season	Title	Original release date
41	1	"Welcome to My Mind"	May 23, 2024
42	2	"Get it Together"	May 30, 2024
43	3	"This is Going to be Really Hot Tea"	June 6, 2024
44	4	"I'm the Man of the Year!"	June 13, 2024
45	5	"Baby Rocky"	June 20, 2024
46	6	"Stick Up Your Ass"	June 27, 2024
47	7	"The Peak and the Pit"	July 4, 2024
48	8	"This Is My Most Important Job"	July 11, 2024
49	9	"Second Chances"	July 18, 2024
50	10	"I Can't Do This"	July 25, 2024

=== Season 6 (2025) ===
No. overall	No. in season	Title	Original release date
51	1	"Literally Falling Apart"	February 6, 2025
52	2	"I Don't Erase What Happened"	February 13, 2025
53	3	"I Just Can't Wait to Be King"	February 20, 2025
54	4	"She Said Yes!"	February 27, 2025
55	5	"Khloéwood"	March 6, 2025
56	6	"Kim and Khloé Take India"	March 13, 2025
57	7	"Payback's a Bitch"	March 20, 2025
58	8	"She Is So Elle Woods"	March 27, 2025
59	9	"We're Going Camping!"	April 3, 2025
60	10	"Get the Hell Out of Dodge"	April 10, 2025

=== Season 7 (2025) ===
No. overall	No. in season	Title	Original release date
61	1	"Feels Like the Old Days"	October 23, 2025
62	2	"She Was Such a Hater"	October 30, 2025
63	3	"I'm About to Lose My Shit"	November 6, 2025
64	4	"A Tragedy in Reality TV"	November 13, 2025
65	5	"The Love That You Once Had"	November 20, 2025
66	6	"If It Doesn't Fit, We Must Acquit"	November 27, 2025
67	7	"The Verdict Is In"	December 4, 2025
68	8	"Stay the F*** Away from Me"	December 11, 2025
69	9	"Dolly Freaking Parton"	December 18, 2025
70	10	"So, Breaking News…"	December 25, 2025

=== Season 8 (2026) ===
No. overall	No. in season	Title	Original release date
71	1	"Slap The S*** Outta Her"	October 8, 2026
72	2	"Never Say Never, Right?"	October 15, 2026
73	3	"She Has a Vision"	October 22, 2026
74	4	"Not a Cheater, Not a Liar"	October 29, 2026
75	5	"Don't Try This at Home"	November 5, 2026
76	6	TBA	November 12, 2026
77	7	TBA	November 19, 2026
78	8	TBA	November 26, 2026
79	9	TBA	December 3, 2026
80	10	TBA	December 10, 2026

=== Special ===
No.	Title	Original release date
1	"'Til Death Do Us Part Kourtney & Travis"	April 13, 2023

== Production ==
On September 8, 2020, the Kardashian–Jenner family announced that their long-running reality television series, Keeping Up with the Kardashians, would be ending in 2021. The series had been on-air since 2007 and ran for 20 seasons on NBCUniversal's E! television channel. The program concluded on June 20, 2021.

In December 2020, during Disney's investors presentation event, it was announced that the Kardashian–Jenner sisters: Kim, Kourtney, and Khloé Kardashian, Kendall and Kylie Jenner — and their mother, Kris Jenner had signed a multi-year exclusive deal to create global content for Hulu. In October 2021, it was announced that an untitled Kardashian–Jenner Hulu series would be produced by the British production company, Fulwell 73. On January 1, 2022, the series title, The Kardashians, was announced by Hulu. According to Khloé, "to be still on cable was just not so on-brand for [the family]", explaining why the family decided to move to the streaming platform. The series is executive produced by Ben Winston, Danielle King, Emma Conway, and Elizabeth Jones for Fulwell 73, Kris Jenner, Kim Kardashian, Kourtney Kardashian, Khloé Kardashian, Kendall Jenner, and Kylie Jenner for Kardashian Jenner Productions, and Ryan Seacrest. King also serves as the series showrunner.

The first season premiered on April 14, 2022, and consisted of ten episodes. After the season finale, which ended on a cliffhanger, media started speculating a second season.

Ahead of the series premiere, it was reported in March 2022 that Hulu had already renewed the series for a second season, as part of a multi-season order, with a total of forty episodes; the series was called a "premium" version of Keeping Up with the Kardashians. During May–July 2022, the Kardashian sisters posted behind-the-scenes pictures from the series on their social media accounts, hinting at a second season. In June, it was confirmed that filming for the second season was underway. On an episode of Deadline's Crew Call podcast, executive producer Danielle King confirmed that a second season was in production, stating that Kourtney and Travis Barker's wedding was filmed. However, Kourtney later clarified that the season covers "everything leading up till [their wedding]". In July, Hulu announced that the second season would premiere in September 2022. It consisted of ten episodes. Days ahead of the second season's premiere in September 2022, Kourtney revealed in an interview with E! News that a third season was in production. The third season was announced in March 2023; it premiered on May 25, 2023.

During Disney's upfront presentation in May 2023, it was announced that Hulu extended the show's forty-episode order, with an additional twenty episodes—renewing it up to a sixth season. In June, executive producers Danielle King and Ben Winston revealed that production for the fourth season was underway. The fourth season was announced on July 27, 2023—the same day the third season's finale was released. The fifth season was filmed in late 2023 and announced in March 2024. As the fifth-season finale was released, on July 25, Hulu announced a twenty-episode order for the series, comprising the previously ordered sixth season and an additional ten episodes.

== Release ==
The Kardashians premiered on April 14, 2022, on Hulu in the United States; episodes were released weekly on Thursdays. It premiered simultaneously internationally on Disney+ under the dedicated streaming hub Star, as an original series, Disney+ Hotstar, and on now-defunct Star+ in Latin America. In 2022 and 2023, the series aired two seasons per year; one premiering in the spring and another in the fall. Since 2024, only one season has been released per year, in the spring.

The first season consisted of ten episodes, with the season finale being released on June 16, 2022. The second season premiered on September 22, 2022, following the same release schedule as the first season. The season premiere picked up where the first season-finale ended. The third season premiered on May 25, 2023, with the fourth season premiering on September 28, 2023. The fifth season premiered on May 23, 2024. The sixth season premiered on February 2, 2025.

== Reception ==
=== Audience viewership ===
According to Hulu, The Kardashians premiere was the most-watched series premiere for the streaming service in its first three days in the United States, and was the most-watched Star Originals series on Disney+ and Star+ across global markets. According to Whip Media's TV Time, The Kardashians was the tenth most streamed original series across all platforms in the United States during the week ending November 6, 2022, and the ninth during the week ending November 13, 2022. It was the eighth during the week of May 28, 2023, the ninth during the week of June 4, 2023, the seventh during the week of June 11, 2023, the tenth during the week of June 16, 2023, and the tenth during the week of November 12, 2023.

In November 2023, during Disney's earnings call, CEO Bob Iger revealed that The Kardashians had become the most watched unscripted series in Hulu history. The fifth-season premiere in May 2024 became the most-watched unscripted premiere of 2024 on Hulu in the US, and on Disney+ and Star+ globally, with 3.9 million views across all three platforms in its first four days. It also marked the second-most-watched entertainment premiere on Disney-owned streaming platforms of 2024. Disney told Deadline Hollywood that streaming numbers for the first season "[had] tripled" following the fifth-season premiere whilst seasons two to four surged "between 99% to 187%" in viewership.

=== Critical response ===
According to the review aggregation website Rotten Tomatoes, the series' first season has a 31% approval rating based on 16 critics' reviews, with an average rating of 5.80/10. The website's critics consensus reads: "While hardcore fans might enjoy catching up with The Kardashians, the lifestyles of this rich and famous family have lost their novelty." Metacritic assigned the series a weighted average score of 49 out of 100 based on 9 reviews, indicating "mixed or average reviews".

=== Accolades ===
Awards and nominations received by The Kardashians
Award	Year	Category	Nominee(s)	Result	Ref.
People's Choice Awards	2022	The Reality Show of 2022	The Kardashians	Won	
People's Choice Awards	2022	The Reality TV Star of 2022	Khloé Kardashian	Won	
People's Choice Awards	2022	The Reality TV Star of 2022	Kim Kardashian	Nominated	
People's Choice Awards	2024	The Reality Show of the Year	The Kardashians	Won	
People's Choice Awards	2024	The Reality TV Star of the Year	Khloé Kardashian	Won	
People's Choice Awards	2024	The Reality TV Star of the Year	Kim Kardashian	Nominated	
MTV Movie & TV Awards	2023	Best Docu-Reality Show	The Kardashians	Won	
Critics' Choice Real TV Awards	2023	Best Unstructured Series	The Kardashians	Nominated	
