= EE Wembley Cup =

YouTube football tournament held at Wembley Stadium

- The logo of the final Wembley Cup in 2018
- Organiser(s): EE
- Founded: 2015; 11 years ago
- Region: England
- Teams: 4
- Current champions: F2 FC (First title)
- Most championships: Spencer FC (Two titles)
- Broadcaster: YouTube (Spencer FC)
- Website: Wembley Cup with EE

The Wembley Cup, also known as The Wembley Cup with EE, was a charity football tournament played at Wembley Stadium in London and held annually between 2015 through 2018. Before 2018, the tournament was contested by two teams who played one standard 90-minute match. In 2018, the tournament was expanded to four teams, who played each other in a round-robin group stage of 60-minute matches, not played at Wembley, before 30-minute semi-final and final games played on the same day at Wembley.

Alongside the tournament, a companion video series was uploaded to the Spencer FC YouTube channel which would showcase a number of challenges to determine the squads for the final game. Squads consisted initially of YouTube content creators, with some ex-professionals (referred to in the series as "Legends"). In 2018, the squads were decided before the video series had started, the only exception being which legend was draft picked to play for each team. The order of this draft pick was based on the final standings of the aforementioned group stage.

All matches were also uploaded to the Spencer FC YouTube channel, with matches at Wembley from 2016 onwards being livestreamed as well as being watched by a crowd in the stadium.

The tournament was sponsored each year by mobile phone network EE, who also sponsor Wembley Stadium.

== History ==
In August 2015, the EE Wembley Cup kicked off for the first time and it saw Spencer FC take on Sidemen United, the latter team named after the Sidemen and featured five of the group's seven members (all except KSI and Vikkstar123) as players. This Wembley Cup was played behind closed doors and had no attendees. The two captains were Spencer Owen (Spencer FC) and Miniminter (Sidemen United). This was also the only Wembley Cup not to include 'legend' players in the teams and not to be live streamed on YouTube. The final ended in Spencer FC beating Sidemen United by five goals to two. The Sidemen would later go on to host their own annual football charity matches beginning the following year after this event.

With the 2015 Wembley Cup being a hit with fans, a second season was confirmed, but this time Spencer FC faced Weller Wanderers. The two captains for the second series were Spencer Owen (Spencer FC) and Joe Weller (Weller Wanderers) The whole match was completely revamped with the introduction of the match being live streamed on YouTube, the sale of live tickets to the game, the inclusion of some former professional footballers, namely Peter Schmeichel, Robbie Fowler, Robert Pires, Jay-Jay Okocha, Patrick Kluivert and Jamie Carragher. Over 18,000 people attended live and hundreds of thousands watched the livestream on YouTube. This bought the Wembley Cup to the attention of the media and other news outlets.

The 2017 event saw two different and new teams enter the mix. Hashtag United (captained by Spencer Owen) came up against Tekkers Town (captained by the F2 Freestylers). Spencer and his side had to be on their best form to beat the 'strongest' YouTube footballing team out there. The third series saw five new Footballing 'Legends' entering the mix. Robbie Fowler was the only 'Legend' from Series Two to be in Series Three. He was joined by David James, Robbie Savage, Steven Gerrard, Emile Heskey and William Gallas. Rio Ferdinand was set to play in the Wembley Cup 2017 Final but unfortunately sustained an injury which ruled him out. The Frenchman, William Gallas had big boots to fill. Much like the second Wembley Cup, it was live streamed on YouTube, tickets available for purchase and 'legends' making an appearance. The third season of the Wembley Cup was a landmark for YouTube football as it doubled the YouTube football attendance record set by the previous Wembley Cup from 18,00 to 34,172. It was also the first time the FA trialled VAR at Wembley, although it was not called upon within the game. Spencer Owen's Hashtag United came out on top when they comfortably beat Tekkers Town 6-1.

The 2018 series consisted of four teams battling it out in a Group Stage format. These teams were Hashtag United, F2 FC, XO FC and Rebel FC. Hashtag United come out on top of the group with F2 FC coming 2nd, XO FC coming third and Rebel FC finishing fourth. Hashtag United faced Rebel FC in the first Semi Final and XO FC came up against F2 FC in the second Semi Final. Rebel FC shocked the YouTube Football scene when they came out victorious against the holders Hashtag United. The game ended 0-1. For this series, EE introduced new rules, including a fast and furious 30-minute match format, Man Down Time and Sin Bins, turning the traditional footballing tournament on its head. The live semi-final, which saw F2 FC & XO FC go head to head, was the first game in The EE Wembley Cup Final history to see Man Down time brought into play. A new rule which saw a player from each team leave the field every minute until a team scores. The second semi final between F2 FC & XO FC ended in a 0-0 draw and had to be decided in the 'dreaded' Man Down stage. Bradley Simmonds stole the match for F2 FC as the players were quickly dropping off the field. This set up a final between Rebel FC and F2 FC. The French Footballing 'Legend', David Trezeguet opened the scoring after a looping volley which forced Rebel FC Goalkeeper, Kaelin Martin make an unfortunate mistake which ultimately led to F2 FC grabbing their first ever Wembley Cup trophy.

== 2015 Wembley Cup ==
The 2015 Wembley Cup was the inaugural edition of the Wembley Cup, an annual football competition contested by two teams. It took place at Wembley Stadium in London, England.

Spencer FC beat Sidemen United 5-2 in the final to win the competition and their first title.

8 August 2015

Spencer FC (England)	5–2	(England) Sidemen FC
RossiHD 5', 56'; Joe Weller 8'; ChrisMD 65'; Billy Wingrove 86'	Report	Daniel Cutting 7', 18'

Wembley Stadium, London
Attendance: 0

GK	29	David Vujanic
RB	3	Oakelfish
CB	99	Anesongib
CB	75	Poet
LB	25	Hurder of Buffalo
RM	9	RossiHD
CM	10	ChrisMD
CM	6	Spencer FC (c)
LM	8	Jeremy Lynch
ST	11	Billy Wingrove
ST	8	Joe Weller	(yellow card) 8'
Substitutes:
	26	NepentheZ
	4	TheBurntChip
	14	MGH
	12	Day
Manager:
Martin Keown

GK	1	Hugh Wizzy
RB	4	Zerkaa
CB	33	Wroetoshaw
CB	15	Behzinga
LB	0	Jme
RM	98	Footballskills98
CM	17	Calfreezy
CM	7	Miniminter (c)
LM	21	Tobjizzle
ST	10	FifaManny
ST	14	Daniel Cutting
Substitutes:
	11	Callux
	9	Tobiias Gaming
	87	Bateson
	12	Richards
Manager:
Ray Wilkins

== 2016 Wembley Cup ==
The 2016 Wembley Cup was contested by two teams. It took place at Wembley Stadium.

Spencer FC beat Weller Wanderers 7-4 in the final to win the competition and their second title.

2 September 2016
17:30 BST

Spencer FC (England)	7–4	(England) Weller Wanderers
Robert Pires 16'; Patrick Kluivert 34', 39'; Chuboi 64'; Seb Carmichael-Brown (pen.), 70'; Manny 82'; Daniel Cutting 93'	Report	Robbie Fowler 14'; Kieran Brown 29'; Theo Baker 31', 49'

Wembley Stadium, London
Attendance: 18,000+

GK	29	David Vujanic
RB	6	Spencer (c)
CB	75	Poet
CB	23	Jamie Carragher
LB	70	Castro
RM	17	Manny
CM	7	Robert Pires
CM	21	Séan Garnier
LM	44	Seb Carmichael-Brown
ST	9	Patrick Kluivert
ST	14	Daniel Cutting
Substitutes:
	18	Joe Sugg
	37	Chu Boi
	87	Bateson
	2	TwoSync Matt
	30	Hugh Wizzy
Manager:
Martin Keown

GK	1	Peter Schmeichel
RWB	4	TwoSync Chris
CB	94	George Benson
CB	12	Jimmy Conrad
CB	13	Elliot Crawford
LWB	5	Kazooie
CM	16	ChrisMD
CM	10	Jay-Jay Okocha
CM	77	Theo Baker
ST	99	Joe Weller (c)
ST	27	Robbie Fowler
Substitutes:
	24	Hjerpseth
	19	STR
	98	Kieran Brown
	25	BennyCentral
	15	Caspar Lee
Manager:
Stuart Pearce

== 2017 Wembley Cup ==
The 2017 Wembley Cup was contested by two teams. It took place at Wembley Stadium. Rio Ferdinand was supposed to play for Hashtag United, but did not due to injury, so William Gallas took his place for the game.

Hashtag United beat Tekkers Town 6-1 in the final to win the competition and their third title.

7 October 2017
15:00 BST

Hashtag United (England)	6–1	(England) Tekkers Town
Ryan Adams 23'; Dan Brown 45'; Theo Baker 55', 64'; Charlie Morley 85'; Phil Martin 87'	Report	Jeremy Lynch (pen.), 27'

Wembley Stadium, London
Attendance: 34,172
Referee: Jon Moss

GK	1	Andy Jeffs-Watts
RB	12	Jimmy Conrad
CB	22	Sam Adams
CB	4	Rich Beck
LB	6	Spencer (c)
RM	21	Charlie Morley
CM	23	Phil Martin
CM	28	Jack Harrison
LM	11	Seb Carmichael-Brown
ST	10	Dan Brown
ST	9	Ryan Adams
Substitutes:
	27	Robbie Fowler
	8	Robbie Savage
	16	William Gallas
	15	Jemel
	2	Sam Ecott
	77	Scott Pollock
	13	Jacko
	14	Theo Baker
Manager:
Martin Keown

GK	30	Hugh Wizzy
RB	98	Kieran Brown
CB	6	Poet
CB	13	Elliot Crawford
LB	77	Wroetoshaw
RM	7	ChrisMD
CDM	14	Daniel Cutting
LM	17	Manny
CAM	10	Jeremy Lynch (c)
ST	3	Josh Pieters
ST	5	Séan Garnier
Substitutes:
	1	David James
	8	Steven Gerrard
	21	Emile Heskey
	4	Reev
	19	David Vujanic
	9	Joe Weller
	21	Tobjizzle
	12	KSI
Manager:
Stuart Pearce

== 2018 Wembley Cup ==
The 2018 Wembley Cup was the fourth edition of the Wembley Cup. The 2018 competition was the first to be contested by four teams, in a four way tournament style. It was also the first to introduce Man Down or Golden Goal, which is where a player was removed for every minute without a goal. Eventually only the goalkeepers remained, and a goal ends the extra time period.

The first two games played were Hashtag United VS Rebel FC Followed by F2 FC VS XO FC. The winners of each game played each other in the final. As a result of the first two fixtures, the final was Rebel FC vs F2 FC. All three matches were played at Wembley Stadium, London.

There were four legends and four YouTubers, whose teams were decided in a draft style format. Draft picks were as follows:

- Hashtag United: ChrisMD (YouTuber), Robert Pires (Legend)
- XO FC: Séan Garnier (YouTuber), Cafu (Legend)
- F2 FC: Manny (YouTuber), David Trezeguet (Legend)
- Rebel FC: Joe Weller (YouTuber), Michael Essien (Legend)

=== Group stage ===
Pos	Team	Pld	W	D	L	GF	GA	GD	Pts
1	Hashtag United	3	3	0	0	6	1	+5	9
2	F2 FC	3	1	0	2	3	4	−1	3
3	XO	3	1	0	2	2	3	−1	3
4	Rebel	3	1	0	2	3	6	−3	3

=== Group stage - Round One ===
Hashtag United	3–0	Rebel FC
Neil Richmond; *Casey Barker (o.g.)

Wembley

Spencer Owen (c)
Theo Baker
Charlie Morley
Hashtag Harry
Tom Williams
Sam Adams
Tekkers Guru
Wes Tanser
Ricky Evans
Lee Hursit
Jack Harrison
Harry Honesty
Marcus Stamp
Andrew Cade-Watts
Jamie Jackson
Ryan Adams
Dan Brown
Neil Richmond

Calfreezy (c)
Reev
Casey Barker
SV2
Will Osei-Bonsu
Marcus Carter
Ali Hamid
Lionel Baguma
Andrew Williams
Dillon Gordon
Andrew Samuels
Reyen El-Hafidi
Sam Byles
Rory Harper
Jesse Waller-Lassen
Andrew Savva
Kaelin Martin

F2 FC	0–1	XO FC
		Christian Hurley

Wembley

Billy Wingrove (c)
Jeremy Lynch (c)
ManLikeHaks
Calum Best
Bradley Simmonds
Simo Jepht
Kevin De Serpa
Callum Ellesely
Joe Russell
Cameron Currie
Bradley Russell
Lawrie Walker
Luis Morrison
Greg Lincoln
John Frendo
Jack Fowler

Stephen Tries (c)
WillNE
True Geordie
Laurence McKenna
Leroy Lungu
Adam Boultwood
Milad Moghadam
Christian Hurley
James Allcott
Aaron Murray
Thomas King
Cam Kirkham
Thomas Cooney
Dan Lambert
Rocshai Palmer
Romaine Bogle
Elliot Hackney
Mike Cadle

=== Group stage - Round Two ===
Hashtag United	1–0	XO FC
Charlie Morley

Wembley

Spencer Owen (c)
Theo Baker
Charlie Morley
Hashtag Harry
Tom Williams
Sam Adams
Tekkers Guru
Wes Tanser
Ricky Evans
Lee Hursit
Jack Harrison
Harry Honesty
Marcus Stamp
Andrew Cade-Watts
Jamie Jackson
Ryan Adams
Dan Brown
Neil Richmond

Stephen Tries (c)
WillNE
True Geordie
Laurence McKenna
Leroy Lungu
Adam Boultwood
Milad Moghadam
Christian Hurley
James Allcott
Aaron Murray
Thomas King
Cam Kirkham
Thomas Cooney
Dan Lambert
Rocshai Palmer
Romaine Bogle
Elliot Hackney
Mike Cadle

F2 FC	2–1 (a.e.t.)	Rebel FC
Simo Jepht (red card); Callum Ellesley		Jesse Waller-Lassen (yellow card)

Wembley

Billy Wingrove (c)
Jeremy Lynch (c)
ManLikeHaks
Calum Best
Bradley Simmonds
Simo Jepht
Kevin De Serpa
Callum Ellesely
Joe Russell
Cameron Currie
Bradley Russell
Lawrie Walker
Luis Morrison
Greg Lincoln
John Frendo
Jack Fowler

Calfreezy (c)
Reev
Casey Barker
SV2
Will Osei-Bonsu
Marcus Carter
Ali Hamid
Lionel Baguma
Andrew Williams
Dillon Gordon
Andrew Samuels
Reyen El-Hafidi
Sam Byles
Rory Harper
Jesse Waller-Lassen
Andrew Savva
Kaelin Martin

=== Group stage - Round Three ===
Hashtag United	2–1	F2 FC
Theo Baker; Neil Richmond		Bradley Russell

Wembley

Spencer Owen (c)
Theo Baker
Charlie Morley
Hashtag Harry
Tom Williams
Sam Adams
Tekkers Guru
Wes Tanser
Ricky Evans
Lee Hursit
Jack Harrison
Harry Honesty
Marcus Stamp
Andrew Cade-Watts
Jamie Jackson
Ryan Adams
Dan Brown
Neil Richmond

Billy Wingrove (c)
Jeremy Lynch (c)
ManLikeHaks
Calum Best
Bradley Simmonds
Simo Jepht
Kevin De Serpa
Callum Ellesely
Joe Russell
Cameron Currie
Bradley Russell
Lawrie Walker
Luis Morrison
Greg Lincoln
John Frendo
Jack Fowler

XO FC	1–2	Rebel FC
Elliot Hackney		Adam Boultwood (o.g.); Dillon Gordon

Wembley

Calfreezy (c)
Reev
Casey Barker
SV2
Will Osei-Bonsu
Marcus Carter
Ali Hamid
Lionel Baguma
Andrew Williams
Dillon Gordon
Andrew Samuels
Reyen El-Hafidi
Sam Byles
Rory Harper
Jesse Waller-Lassen
Andrew Savva
Kaelin Martin

Stephen Tries (c)
WillNE
True Geordie
Laurence McKenna
Leroy Lungu
Adam Boultwood
Milad Moghadam
Christian Hurley
James Allcott
Aaron Murray
Thomas King
Cam Kirkham
Thomas Cooney
Dan Lambert
Rocshai Palmer
Romaine Bogle
Elliot Hackney
Mike Cadle

=== Semi-finals ===
25 November 2018
14:00 BST
Semi Final 1

Hashtag United	0–1	Rebel FC
		Jesse Waller Lassen 6'

Wembley

GK	13	Jamie Jackson
RB	6	Spencer (c)
CB	20	Marcus Stamp
CB	17	Jack Harrison
LB	3	Tom Williams
RM	9	Ryan Adams
CDM	4	Tekkers Guru
CDM	15	Ricky Evans
LM	7	Robert Pires
CAM	14	Theo Baker
ST	16	Neil Richmond
Substitutes:
	100	ChrisMD
	8	Lee Hursit
	12	Wes Tanser
	1	Andrew Cade-Watts
	10	Dan Brown
	21	Charlie Morely
	5	Sam Adams
	11	Harry Honesty
	96	Hashtag Harry

GK	1	Kaelin Martin
RB	2	Calfreezy (c)
CB	5	Reev
CB	13	Will Osei-Bonsu
LB	3	Marcus Carter
CDM	4	Lionel Baguma
CM	15	Michael Essien
CM	77	Sam Byles
RW	14	Hosier
LW	8	Dillon Gordon
ST	23	Jesse Waller-Lassen
Substitutes:
	45	Joe Weller
	20	Ali Hamid
	30	Robinson
	91	Casey Barker
	93	Dante
	9	Rory Harper
	99	SV2
	7	Reyen El-Hafidi
	21	Savva

25 November 2018
15:05 BST
Semi Final 2

F2 FC	1–0	XO FC
Bradley Simmonds		WillNE (yellow card)

Wembley

GK	1	Lawrie Walker
RB	2	ManLikeHaks
CB	5	Callum Ellesely
CB	6	Joe Russell
LB	3	Cameron Currie
RM	7	Calum Best
CDM	15	Greg Lincoln
CDM	8	Bradley Simmonds
LM	11	Billy Wingrove (c)
CAM	21	Kevin De Serpa
ST	4	Simo Jepht
Substitutes:
	17	David Trezeguet
	10	Jeremy Lynch (c)
	20	Jack Fowler
	71	Manny
	14	Bradley Russell
	9	John Frendo
	21	Luis Morrison

GK	13	Mike Cadle
RWB	4	Milad Moghadam
CB	7	Aaron Murray
CB	3	Adam Boultwood
CB	8	Leroy Lungu
LWB	0	Cam Kirkham
CM	11	Thomas King
CM	16	James Allcott (c)
CM	6	Christian Hurley
ST	21	Séan Garnier
ST	10	Elliot Hackney
Substitutes:
	2	Cafu
	9	True Geordie
	97	Rocshai Palmer
	1	Dan Lambert
	14	Laurence McKenna
	15	Thomas Cooney
	4	WillNE
	17	Romaine Bogle
	0161	Stephen Tries (c)

=== Final ===
25 November 2018
16:20 BST

Rebel FC	0–1	F2 FC
		David Trezeguet 5'

Wembley
Attendance: 24,562

GK	1	Kaelin Martin
RB	2	Calfreezy (c)
CB	5	Reev
CB	13	Will Osei-Bonsu
LB	3	Marcus Carter
CDM	4	Lionel Baguma
CM	15	Michael Essien
CM	77	Sam Byles
RW	93	Dante
LW	8	Dillon Gordon
ST	23	Jesse Waller-Lassen
Substitutes:
	45	Joe Weller
	20	Ali Hamid
	30	Robinson
	91	Casey Barker
	14	Hosier
	9	Rory Harper
	99	SV2
	7	Reyen El-Hafidi
	21	Savva

GK	1	Lawrie Walker
RB	14	Bradley Russell
CB	5	Callum Ellesely
CB	2	Joe Russell
LB	3	Cameron Currie
RM	7	Calum Best
CDM	6	Simo Jepht
CDM	8	Bradley Simmonds
LM	17	David Trezeguet
CAM	12	Kevin De Serpa
ST	9	Jeremy Lynch (c)
Substitutes:
	2	ManLikeHaks
	20	Jack Fowler
	71	Manny
	15	Greg Lincoln
	9	John Frendo
	21	Luis Morrison

== Wembley Cup Finals goalscorers ==
	Player name	Team(s)	Goals scored
1	(England) Theo Baker	Weller Wanderers / Hashtag United	5
2	(England) Daniel Cutting	Sidemen United / Spencer FC / Tekkers Town	3
3	(England) RossiHD	Spencer FC	2
3	(Netherlands) Patrick Kluivert	Spencer FC	2
4	(England) Joe Weller	Spencer FC / Weller Wanderers / Tekkers Town / Rebel FC	1
4	(Jersey) ChrisMD	Spencer FC / Weller Wanderers / Tekkers Town / Hashtag United	1
4	(England) Billy Wingrove	Spencer FC / Tekkers Town / F2 FC	1
4	(France) Robert Pires	Spencer FC / Hashtag United	1
4	(Nigeria) Chuboi	Spencer FC	1
4	(England) Seb Carmichael-Brown	Spencer FC / Hashtag United	1
4	(England) Manny	Sidemen United / Spencer FC / Tekkers Town / F2 FC	1
4	(England) Robbie Fowler	Weller Wanderers / Hashtag United	1
4	(England) Kieran Brown	Sidemen United / Weller Wanderers / Tekkers Town	1
4	(England) Ryan Adams	Hashtag United	1
4	(England) Dan Brown	Hashtag United	1
4	(England) Charlie Morley	Hashtag United	1
4	(England) Phil Martin	Hashtag United	1
4	(England) Jeremy Lynch	Spencer FC / Tekkers Town / F2 FC	1
4	(England) Jesse Waller Lassen	Rebel FC	1
4	(England) Bradley Simmonds	F2 FC	1
4	(France) David Trezeguet	F2 FC	1

== Wembley Cup Man of the Match winners ==
- No player was awarded Man Of The Match in 2015

Year	Player name	Team(s)
2016	(England) Theo Baker	Weller Wanderers / Hashtag United
2017	(England) Scott Pollock	Hashtag United
2018	(England) Jesse Waller Lassen	Rebel FC

== Players who have played in multiple tournaments ==
	Player name(s)	Team(s)	Years	Number of tournaments
1	Spencer (Spencer FC)	Spencer FC / Hashtag United	2015, 2016, 2017, 2018	4
1	Joe Weller	Spencer FC / Weller Wanderers / Tekkers Town / Rebel FC	2015, 2016, 2017, 2018	4
1	Billy Wingrove	Spencer FC / Tekkers Town / F2 FC	2015, 2016, 2017, 2018	4
1	Jeremy Lynch	Spencer FC / Tekkers Town / F2 FC	2015, 2016, 2017, 2018	4
1	Manny (FifaManny)	Sidemen United / Spencer FC / Tekkers Town / F2 FC	2015, 2016, 2017, 2018	4
1	ChrisMD	Spencer FC / Weller Wanderers / Tekkers Town / Hashtag United	2015, 2016, 2017, 2018	4
2	Theo Baker	Weller Wanderers / Hashtag United	2016, 2017, 2018	3
2	Séan Garnier	Spencer FC / Tekkers Town / XO FC	2016, 2017, 2018	3
2	Kieran Brown (Footballskills98)	Sidemen United / Weller Wanderers / Tekkers Town	2015, 2016, 2017	3
2	Hugh Wizzy	Sidemen United / Spencer FC / Tekkers Town	2015, 2016, 2017	3
2	Daniel Cutting	Sidemen United / Spencer FC / Tekkers Town	2015, 2016, 2017	3
2	Poet	Spencer FC / Tekkers Town	2015, 2016, 2017	3
2	David Vujanic	Spencer FC / Tekkers Town	2015, 2016, 2017	3
3	Andy Cade-Watts (Andy Jeffs-Watts)	Hashtag United	2017, 2018	2
3	Sam Adams	Hashtag United	2017, 2018	2
3	Charlie Morley	Hashtag United	2017, 2018	2
3	Jack Harrison	Hashtag United	2017, 2018	2
3	Dan Brown	Hashtag United	2017, 2018	2
3	Ryan Adams	Hashtag United	2017, 2018	2
3	Jamie Jackson (Jacko)	Hashtag United	2017, 2018	2
3	Reev	Tekkers Town / Rebel FC	2017, 2018	2
3	Robert Pires	Spencer FC / Hashtag United	2016, 2018	2
3	Calfreezy	Sidemen United / Rebel FC	2015, 2018	2
3	Jimmy Conrad	Weller Wanderers / Hashtag United	2016, 2017	2
3	Robbie Fowler	Weller Wanderers / Hashtag United	2016, 2017	2
3	Elliot Crawford	Weller Wanderers / Tekkers Town	2016, 2017	2
3	Seb Carmichael-Brown	Spencer FC / Hashtag United	2016, 2017	2
3	Tobjizzle	Sidemen United / Tekkers Town	2015, 2017	2
3	Wroetoshaw	Sidemen United / Tekkers Town	2015, 2017	2
3	George Benson (Hurder of Buffalo)	Spencer FC / Weller Wanderers	2015, 2016	2
3	Bateson	Sidemen United / Spencer FC	2015, 2016	2

== Records and statistics ==
Team

- Most wins: 2:
  - Spencer FC: 2015, 2016
- Most consecutive wins: 2:
  - Spencer FC: 2015, 2016
- Most goals in a final: 11:
  - Spencer FC 7–4 Weller Wanderers

Individual

- Most wins by player: 3, Spencer Owen (Hashtag United)
- Most wins by manager: 3, Martin Keown, 2015, 2016, 2017
- Youngest Wembley Cup player: Scott Pollock (Hashtag United), 16 years
- Most goals in a single final: RossiHD, Daniel Cutting, Patrick Kluivert, Theo Baker (twice): 2
- Most final goals: Theo Baker: 4
