= James Corden's World Cup Live =

- Genre: Sport
- Presented by: James Corden; Abbey Clancy
- Country of origin: United Kingdom
- Original language: English
- No. of series: 1
- No. of episodes: 14

Production
- Producers: Fulwell 73 Productions & Amigo TV for ITV Sport
- Running time: Varies

Original release
- Network: ITV, ITV4
- Release: 12 June – 11 July 2010

Related
- FIFA World Cup on Fox After Hours with James Corden; The Late Late Show with James Corden

James Corden's World Cup Live is a comedy chat show hosted by comedian James Corden during the 2010 FIFA World Cup. The show was broadcast after every ITV evening match with Abbey Clancy, celebrity guests, a football hero, a studio full of fans, Corden's friends and family, his human World Cup wall chart, and challenges for his celebrity guests, such as 'How Many Peter Jones?', 'Heston Blumen-Cool or Heston Blumem-Fool?' or 'Uru-Guy or Uru-Girl?' and 'Joachim Löw or Joachim No?'. The programme also features exclusive interviews with some of the biggest names in English football, plus regular updates of what was happening in the England players' camp.

== Writing credits ==
(in alphabetical order)

- Kevin Day
- Phil Kerr
- Andy Milligan
- Matt Morgan
- Aiden Spackman

== Episodes ==
No.	Guests	Original release date
1	Katy Perry, Simon Cowell, Gordon Banks	12 June 2010
2	Boris Becker, Dizzee Rascal, Peter Shilton	13 June 2010
3	Pixie Lott, Eamonn Holmes, Jimmy Greaves	15 June 2010
4	Russell Brand, Noel Gallagher, David Seaman	18 June 2010
5	Alan Carr, Vernon Kay, Geoff Hurst	19 June 2010
6	Emma Bunton, Chris Moyles, Terry Butcher	21 June 2010
7	Shakira, Russell Howard, Peter Jones, Matt Le Tissier	23 June 2010
8	Jack Whitehall, Holly Willoughby, Joleon Lescott	25 June 2010
9	Chris Evans, Heston Blumenthal	26 June 2010
10	Rob Brydon, Ruth Jones, Ossie Ardiles	28 June 2010
11	Denise van Outen, George Lamb, Larry Lamb, Jimmy Floyd Hasselbaink	2 July 2010
12	Andy Murray, Dermot O'Leary, Adrian Chiles	6 July 2010
13	JLS, Andrei Arshavin, Edgar Davids	10 July 2010
14	Andrew Flintoff, John Bishop, Dynamo, Peter Crouch, Lemar, Richard Bacon, Tinchy Stryder	11 July 2010
