= Séan Garnier =

French freestyle footballer (born 1984)

Arnaud "Séan" Garnier (born 18 June 1984 in Sens, France) is a French freestyle footballer. He began as an association football player, notably for Auxerre and Troyes, but his professional career was cut short due to injuries.

In 2006, Garnier studied to become a football instructor and started a program of urban freestyle art gaining fame for his own style and skills. He was taught by the current world champion Benjamin Aw. In 2008, he was declared World Champion at the inaugural Red Bull Street Style World Finals in São Paulo, Brazil. Garnier combined music, breakdance, somersaults, various football and basketball elements to his routines. He formed his own team dubbed Street Style Society also called S3 Crew, which combines freestyle football, freestyle basketball as well as some other street sport styles.

Garnier is sponsored by Red Bull. In addition to performing at freestyle football shows, he also practices this sport discipline in matches, such as street soccer, futsal, and panna. He is the captain of French professional futsal team Massaliotes, and champion freestyle in particular with Mexico street football players.

== Appearances ==
In 2014, he appeared as part of the football signing campaign related with UNICEF's initiative for alphabetization through Magic System's song "Magic in the Air".

He was featured in an ad for Mexican retailer Coppel championing an active life for all age groups. In the ad, Garnier disguises himself as an old man, as a character dubbed Abuelo "Grandpa" Memo, and joins in a local five-a-side freestyle match and goes on to "amaze" the young players and an enchanted crowd of spectators through his skills.

In 2016, Garnier played Premier Futsal in India.

On 7 December 2014, Garnier made his first appearance for London United Futsal Club, an amateur club based in South West London, losing 9-2 against then English Champions, Baku Futsal Club.

In 2016, Garnier was a member of the French team for the World's First International Street Soccer Championships, World Street 3s, alongside many other street soccer stars (Edward Van Gils, Issy Hitman, Leamssi, etc.). The team finished fourth after a close semi final against Croatia.

== Awards ==
(Selective)

- 2008: Champion - Red Bull Street Style (São Paulo)
- 2009: Champion - French Freestyle
- 2010: Champion - French Freestyle
- 2010: First place - Styllball Beach Style (Dubai)
- 2012: Champion - French Freestyle
- 2018: World Champion - WFL (India)
