= Fulwell 73 =

British media production company

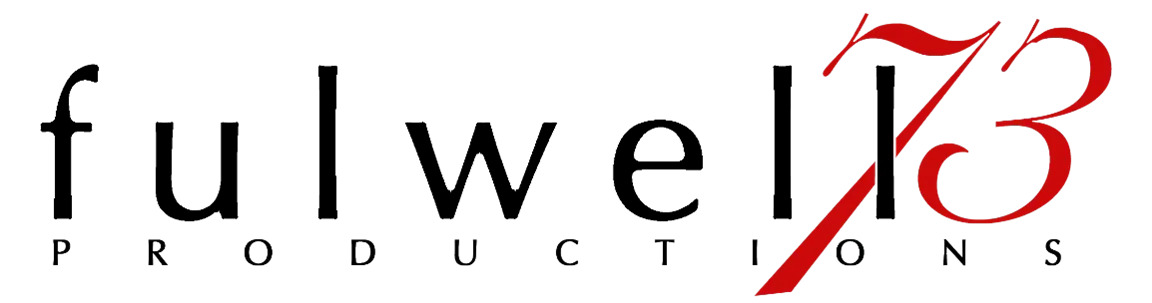
- Type: Private
- Industry: Motion pictures and television production
- Founded: 2005; 21 years ago
- Founders: Gabe Turner; Ben Turner; Leo Pealman; Ben Winston
- Headquarters: London, United Kingdom
- Number of locations: London, UK; Los Angeles, USA; Sunderland, UK
- Key people: Gabe Turner; Ben Turner; Leo Pearlman; Ben Winston; James Corden
- Parent: Fulwell Entertainment (2025–present)
- Website: fulwell73.com

Fulwell 73 is a British television, film and music production company based in London. It was founded in 2005 by brothers Gabe and Ben Turner, Leo Pearlman, and Ben Winston. James Corden became the fifth partner in January 2017. Fulwell 73 operates across a wide range of genres and across all media platforms; theatrical, broadcast and digital.

Originally operating within the UK, Fulwell 73 now operates internationally, across a range of television genres, including scripted comedy, factual entertainment, sport and music.

== Name ==
The name Fulwell 73 is a homage to Sunderland (The "Fulwell End" was the name of a stand at Roker Park and "73" is a reference to the 1973 FA Cup Final, the last time Sunderland won a major trophy). Leo Pearlman, Gabe Turner, and Ben Turner are all Sunderland supporters. Ben Winston, however, supports Arsenal.

In the summer of 2017, Fulwell 73 announced their plans to buy Sunderland from chairman Ellis Short, but in a statement to fanzine A Love Supreme on 21 June 2017, they withdrew their interest, citing the demands of the business. In 2018, Fulwell 73 produced the Netflix documentary series Sunderland 'Til I Die.

In November 2024, it was announced that Fulwell 73 would merge with SpringHill Company with Leo Pearlman and Maverick Carter as co-CEOs of the merged company. The merger was finalized in February 2025, with both companies placed under the Fulwell Entertainment umbrella.

== Production credits ==
=== Film ===
- Turnout (2011)
- Piggy (2012)
- The Class of '92 (2013)
- One Direction: This is Us (2013)
- The Guvnors (2014)
- I Am Bolt (2016)
- White Island (2016)
- Bros: After the Screaming Stops (2018)
- Hitsville: The Making of Motown (2019)
- Cinderella (2021)

=== Television ===
- One Direction: TV Special
- The Late Late Show with James Corden (2015–2023)
- Carpool Karaoke: The Series (2017–2023)
- Drop the Mic (2017–2019)
- Seatbelt Psychic (2018–present)
- Sunderland 'Til I Die (2018–2024)
- Happy Together (2018–2019)
- The World's Best (2019)
- Ben Platt Live from Radio City Music Hall (2020)
- Grammy Awards (2021–present)
- The Republic of Sarah (2021)
- Jonas Brothers Family Roast (2021)
- The Kardashians (2022–present)
- The Holiday Shift (2023)
- FIFA World Cup on Fox After Hours with James Corden (2026)
- The Three of Us (TBA)
- Crush4U (TBA)
- Byker (TBA)

=== Music videos ===
- One Direction: Drag Me Down
- Only The Young: I Do
- Olly Murs & Demi Lovato: Up
- Zara Larsson: Weak Heart
- One Direction: Steal My Girl
- One Direction: Night Changes
- Raleigh Ritchie: Stay Inside
- Little Mix: Word Up
- One Direction: You & I
- Gary Barlow & Elton John: Face To Face
- One Direction: Best Song Ever
- One Direction: Midnight Memories
- Gary Barlows World Cup Squad: Greatest Day
- Merz: Goodbye My Chimera
- One Direction: Story Of My Life
- 5 Seconds Of Summer – Try Hard
- Gary Barlow: Let Me Go
- One Direction: One Way Or Another
- Harry Styles: Golden
- Gary Barlow & The Commonwealth: Sing
- 5 Seconds Of Summer: Wherever You Are
- JLS: Proud

=== TV ads ===
- Samsung S6
- Rimmel
- Cadburys
- Jessops
- Sport Relief
- BBC XMAS Idents
- Eram Shoes
- Evans Cycle
- Sony 4K
- Lonsdale
- Marks & Spencer
- James Corden: The Autobiography

=== Others ===
- Adele One Night Only
- The Feeling Nuts Comedy Night
- When Corden Met
- Sounds Like Friday Night
- A Bus Could Run You Over (in-production)
- When Corden Met Barlow
- Life of Ryan
- Robbie Williams: One Night At The Palladium
- Laurie Cunningham
- Gary Barlow & Friends
- A Very JLS Christmas
- When Robbie Met James
- Flintoff: From Lords To The Rings
- Gary Barlow: On Her Majesty’s Service
- This Is Justin Bieber
- One Direction: A Year In The Making
- Freddie Flintoff: Hidden Side of Sport
- This Is JLS
- James Corden's World Cup Live
- FIFA World Cup on Fox After Hours with James Corden
- One Direction: Where We Are
- JLS: Eyes Wide Open
- In The Hands Of The Gods
- Hollywood Secrets
- The Red Nose USA Brit Crew
- Behind The Bond
- Harry & Paul
- Andy Murray: The Movie
- David Walliams Exes
- Smithy Saves Comic Relief
- Jimmy Carr
- Smithy Wins Coach Of The Year
- Men Behaving Badly
- Smithy Meets The England Team
