= JaackMaate =

English YouTuber and podcast host

- Born: Jack Carl Dean; 7 March 1993 (age 33); Norwich, England
- Other names: Jaack (main); JaackMaate's Happy Hour (podcast)
- Known for: YouTube, podcast hosting, sports presenting
- Notable work: JaackMaate's Happy Hour Podcast

YouTube information
- Channels: JaackMaate; Happy Hour Podcast
- Years active: 2008–2022 (main); 2018–present (podcast)
- Genres: Entertainment; commentary; comedy
- Subscribers: 1,340,000 (Jaackmate); 780,000 (Happy Hour Podcast)
- Views: 446 million (total)
- Last updated: 04 February 2026

Jack Carl Dean, better known by his online alias JaackMaate, is an English YouTuber, podcast host, sports presenter and comedian. He is primarily known for his "opinionated and frank" discussion of YouTube content, and as the host of the comedy podcast series JaackMaate's Happy Hour Podcast, which consistently tops the Spotify most-listened charts. He also gained national media attention when he staged a demonstration in response to Boris Johnson's rule-breaking during the national lockdown.

In 2019, Dean was listed at No. 88 in The Sunday Times' list of the top 100 most influential online creators in the United Kingdom. He appeared on Big Brother as a contestant for one week.

== Career ==
=== YouTube ===
Dean found an audience on video sharing site YouTube through his "opinionated and frank" commentary on celebrity culture on the site. His criticism included overpriced merchandise sold to fans, subpar content from vloggers and a disconnect from the core audience. This was exemplified in Dean's comedic criticism of vlogger Zoella's advent calendar, which he deemed to be overpriced.

In response to UK Prime Minister Boris Johnson's alleged breaking of lockdown rules, Dean organised 100 members of the public to dress as Johnson and protest outside Downing Street. The stunt received wide media recognition and acclaim.

=== JaackMaate's Happy Hour Podcast ===
Dean, alongside co-host Stevie White, has been the host of JaackMaate's Happy Hour Podcast since 2018. Originally marketed as a YouTube Drama show, after the departure of original co-host Alex Elmslie (known online as ImAlexx) and the addition of YouTuber DudeyRhino, the podcast shifted towards a comedy format. DudeyRhino's departure was announced in 2020. The current hosting line-up consists of Dean, Stevie White, Robbie Knox, and Alfie Indra.

The podcast has had notable guests including Belle Delphine, Ricky Gervais, Raphael Rowe and Asim Chaudhry. The show was described by Radio Times as "intimate interviews with the internet's best celebrities to join the conversation about everything from moral dilemmas to life's big questions in their show of the week column". In September 2020, Dean announced he had signed an exclusive multi-year Spotify podcast deal.

In February 2023, Dean took the show on tour alongside fellow co-hosts Stevie White, Robbie Knox and Alfie Indra. The tour was a success and was extended for a further seventeen dates in April and May 2023. In February 2024, Dean announced the show's second tour, The Big Fat Massive Hunt, alongside Happy Hour co-hosts Stevie White, Robbie Knox and Alfie Indra.

In 2025, Dean and White announced Jaack & Stevie, a subscriber based video service where the pair uploaded a variety of different comedy videos. In October 2026, it was announced that Dean and co-hosts Stevie White and Robbie Knox would be switching on the Christmas lights at Norwich. In celebration, the Happy Hour podcast hosted the Lord Mayor of Norwich Karen Davis on their six hundred and ninety-eighth episode. However, at the end of the month, it was announced from the council that Dean and his co-hosts were dropped from the event due to failing 'to identify issues from previous published content before announcing him'. Dean later elaborated that 'one person complained to the council about my old 'edgy' online videos from 2014' which caused the council to withdraw the hosts from the event.

The cancellation was met with scrutiny from both the public and Dean. In November, Dean, Knox and White announced an alternative Christmas lights switch-on event in Norwich, featuring a tour that fans could join of various establishments across the city where the hosts would ceremonially switch on festive lights. They asked independent businesses, community projects and charities to contact the show to be part of the tour. They also announced a one-off Christmas live show at Lanes Comedy Club, which would raise funds for Mind the Gap, the chosen charity of the Lord Mayor.

== Personal life ==
Dean has been open about his diagnosis of OCD and his bouts with anxiety and depression. In particular, his OCD manifests itself as health anxiety, which caused him to avoid seeing the doctor for fear of an extreme diagnosis.

Dean has also been open about his mother, her struggles with alcoholism, and the effect on his mental health.

Dean became engaged to long-time girlfriend Fiona South in 2018.

Dean is a supporter of West Ham United.
