= Gary Barlow: On Her Majesty's Service =

Video by Gary Barlow
- Released: 3 June 2012 - Broadcast; 25 June 2012 - DVD
- Genre: Pop, documentary
- Length: 60:00
- Label: Decca Studios, Polydor Records
- Director: Ben Winston
- Producer: Ben Winston

Gary Barlow: On Her Majesty's Service is a documentary featuring the process of Gary Barlow writing the Queen's Diamond Jubilee official single and travelling across The Commonwealth enlisting the help of singers and musicians to feature in the track.

== Background ==
With Gary Barlow and Andrew Lloyd Webber asked to create an official single for the Diamond Jubilee of Elizabeth II, the documentary starts with them writing the melody and music of the song together, whilst also showing Gary talking to Prince Charles and discussing what The Queen would enjoy listening to in the song. From this Barlow and Prince Charles agree that the song should aim to feature musicians and artists from The Commonwealth of the Prince states it is something that The Queen considers to be one of her finest achievements of her reign. Barlow then takes the base of the music he and Lloyd Webber have written and aims to add the lyrics and the instrumentals to the song by visiting countries across The Commonwealth. The lyrics were written by Barlow whilst visiting villages in Kenya, where Princess Elizabeth had been visiting when she was told that her father George VI had died and that she had ascended to the throne. Barlow said "She was in Kenya on holiday when she found out her father had died and she found out she was the Queen so I drove to this place called Treetops and I wrote". Barlow went on to say that "She started her reign there and we started our record in that place" and it was fitting that the song would return to those origins.

Once the lyrics were written Barlow met many people and groups such as an African Children's Choir who provided vocals to the track, whilst also meeting a Masai tribe, and the Slum Drummers who create their music from rubbish in their village. In Jamaica, Barlow meets with Prince Harry who plays a tambourine which Barlow records and programs onto the single through his laptop whilst he also finds a Rastafarian retreat where he records percussions from a young boy who plays drums. As his journey comes to a close he is introduced to an Aboriginal singer called Gurrumul on the top of a cliff in the Blue Mountains who was blind since birth and provides vocals and acoustic guitar to the demo of the track. With the song taking shape, Barlow then visits the Sydney Opera House to record a full symphony orchestra before heading back to Abbey Road Studios to master the track and to add the vocals of The Military Wives Choir with Gareth Malone.

The song is finally completed and Barlow, Lloyd Webber and Malone meet The Queen to play her the final version of the song which she then describes as "Splendid". The documentary ends with Barlow and Lloyd Webber presenting the original song sheet of the score in a frame and the video of the song interspersing with a final word from Barlow.

== Ratings ==
The documentary about the Take That star's creation of a song for the Jubilee, was seen by 6.35million viewers upon its broadcast which equated to a 27.7% of the entire TV audience when it aired on BBC One from 7.45 p.m.

== Reception ==
Critical reception was positive towards Barlow and the documentary; The Telegraph awarded it 4 stars, praising Barlow's approach to the cultures around him, and commenting that there were "many touching moments in the documentary" as Barlow journeyed across The Commonwealth. The Guardian also reviewed the programme positively by commenting that "everywhere [Barlow] goes people take a liking to him, want to be his friend. It's hard not to, really: he seems warm, genuine, funny too"; it concluded by stating that "you'd have to be really hard not to be at least a little bit moved by it [as] Gary completes his journey, from the one who isn't Robbie Williams, via X Factor judge, to national treasure."

== Release ==
It was announced by Barlow and through the Take That official website that the Gary Barlow: On Her Majesty's Service would be released on DVD and Blu Ray on 25 June 2012.

== Extras ==
- Behind the scenes
- Making of the documentary
- Interviews
- Official music video of Sing
