= The Late Late Show with James Corden =

American late-night talk show (2015–2023)

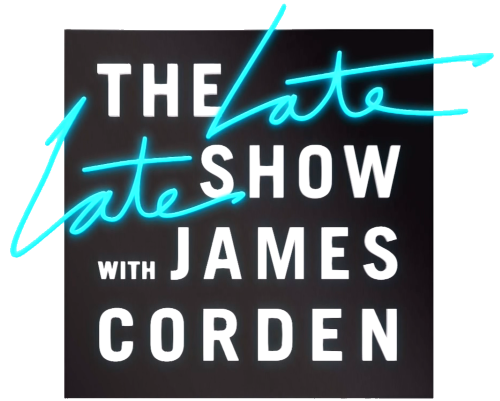
- Also known as: The Late Late Show (franchise brand) (Note: Known as The Late Late Show with James Corden from His Garage during the COVID-19 pandemic)
- Genre: Late-night talk show; Variety show; Political satire
- Written by: Mike Gibbons and Ian Karmel (head writers)
- Directed by: Tim Mancinelli (main show)
- Presented by: James Corden
- Announcer: Reggie Watts
- Music by: Reggie Watts and The Late Late Show Band
- Opening theme: "The Late Late Show"
- Country of origin: United States
- Original language: English
- No. of seasons: 9
- No. of episodes: 1,197 (list of episodes)

Production
- Executive producers: Rob Crabbe; Ben Winston; James Longman; Josie Cliff
- Producers: James Corden; Sheila Rogers
- Production locations: Television City, Los Angeles, California
- Camera setup: Multi-camera
- Running time: 40 minutes
- Production companies: Fulwell 73; CBS Studios

Original release
- Network: CBS
- Release: March 23, 2015 – April 27, 2023

Related
- FIFA World Cup on Fox After Hours with James Corden

The Late Late Show with James Corden (also known simply as Late Late) is an American late-night talk show that aired on CBS from 2015 to 2023. It is the fourth and final iteration of The Late Late Show, and aired in the United States from Monday to Friday nights at 12:37 a.m. ET/PT. The show was taped in front of a studio audience Monday through Thursday afternoons at Television City in Los Angeles, in Studio 56, directly above the Bob Barker Studio (Studio 33). It was produced by Fulwell 73 and CBS Studios.

James Corden was announced as the show's new host on September 8, 2014, succeeding Craig Ferguson. Originally scheduled to premiere on March 9, 2015, CBS later pushed back the premiere to March 23, 2015, so the NCAA basketball tournament could be used to promote Corden's debut.

Corden brought The Late Late Show to England for three special episodes taped at the Methodist Central Hall, Westminster from June 6 to 8, 2017. It was the third time in the show's history that it aired from another country, with Ferguson taking his incarnation to Paris, France, in 2011 and Scotland in 2012. The show returned to London for a week of shows at Methodist Hall on June 18–21, 2018, and June 17–20, 2019.

In April 2022, it was announced that Corden would be leaving The Late Late Show in mid-2023. Its series finale aired on April 27, 2023; reruns of the show still aired from May 1 to September 15, 2023.

== Production ==
Corden said he was "thrilled and honored" and found it "hugely exciting ... to host such a prestigious show". CBS Entertainment chairwoman Nina Tassler said in a statement that Corden is a warm, charming and original performer whose "diverse range of creative instincts and performance talent" make him a "rare entertainment force". Tassler cited Corden's work in such media as theatre, film and television, and called him "loved and respected" in all of them. The show continues to be produced at Television City in Los Angeles. Corden made a surprise guest appearance on predecessor Ferguson's programme on December 16, 2014, two days prior to Ferguson's last broadcast as host, during which the two briefly discussed Corden taking over the show. He also appeared on an episode hosted by Judd Apatow to job shadow, stating he wanted to "learn from his mistakes".

Unlike his predecessors, Corden's Late Late Show has a house band. The band was originally nicknamed "Karen"; however, in response to the slang usage of Karen, changed to "Melissa". The band was led by Reggie Watts, who also acts as the show's announcer. Watts also performs as lead vocals, keyboards, beatboxing, and programmer. The other personnel in the band are Tim Young on lead guitars, Steve Scalfati on keyboards, Hagar Ben-Ari on bass, and Guillermo E. Brown on drums. Watts and the Late Late Show Band composed the theme song. The show's title sequence, which was supposed to be directed by J. J. Abrams, was filmed by the visual firm of Trollbäck + Company, and depicts James Corden and Reggie Watts traveling around Los Angeles in a lowrider and on LED bikes, including some graphics and light painting with a Pixelstick. Trollbäck + Company put this statement below the video: "James Corden and Reggie Watts put the LA LA back into Late Late in a series fun vignettes filmed around Los Angeles for the identity of the new CBS Late Late Show. James originally wanted JJ Abrams to film him, and Reggie scored to a Mark Ronson track. We were of course honored to take JJ's place as he was a bit busy filming a blockbuster! We managed to shoot everything in one night with LED bikes, a Lowrider, and a Pixelstick setting an eclectic visual tone for this experimental new show." The show's executive producers are Rob Crabbe and Ben Winston.

While an opening monologue is a staple of the late-night talk show genre, Corden suggested initially that as he is not a stand-up comedian, he would also be using alternatives to the traditional joke-heavy monologue. However, the show retained the monologue though it is shorter and not as important an element as the monologue on other late-night shows.

The show also uses an interview format similar to that of the British talk show The Graham Norton Show, in which all of the night's guests appear on stage simultaneously. Guests do not walk on stage from the wings but emerge from the back of the studio and walk through the audience rows. As is more typical in British talk shows, the host sits to the left of the guests, a reversal of the traditional American layout. Corden also does not sit behind a desk, unlike other late-night hosts, but in a swivel chair.

On March 14, 2020, the show suspended production because of the COVID-19 pandemic. From March 30, 2020, the show resumed production with Corden hosting from inside his garage and communicating with his band and guests via Zoom video link. Corden returned to a reworked studio without a guest couch or live audience on August 10, 2020. However, from September 14, 2020, Corden resumed hosting via Zoom link from inside his house while self-isolating as a precaution after coming into contact with someone who tested positive for COVID-19, while the band and crew continued filming from inside the studio. Corden returned to the studio from September 21, 2020, after finishing his self-quarantine. Per recommendations by the Los Angeles County Department of Public Health, the program temporarily returned to an at-home format on January 4, 2021.

On April 28, 2022, it was announced that Corden had extended his contract to mid-2023, after which he would leave the show. It was expected to be several months earlier than the previously reported August expiration. In February 2023, it was announced that the series would conclude on April 27, 2023. That month, it was reported that CBS was planning to discontinue the Late Late Show franchise after 28 years in favor of cheaper formats, and had settled on a revival of @midnight—a comedy panel show that had previously aired on sibling network Comedy Central—as a future replacement for the program.

In November 2023, CBS officially announced After Midnight, hosted by stand-up comedian Taylor Tomlinson that premiered on the network on January 16, 2024. However, the show's run was short-lived, and with Tomlinson returning her focus on their standup career full-time, CBS canceled After Midnight one year later in March 2025 after its 2nd season, with its final episode airing on June 12th.

== Episodes ==
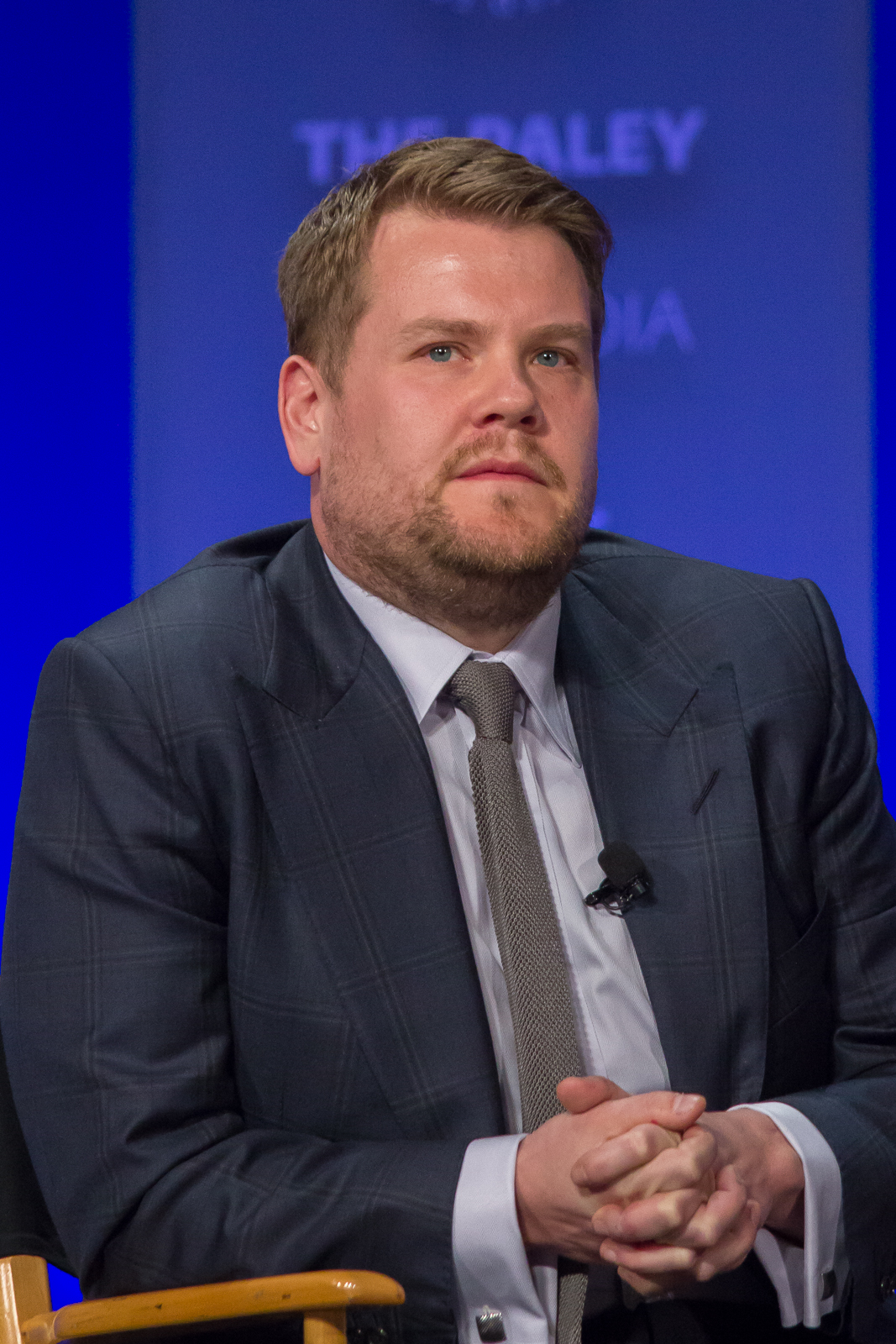
James Corden in 2015

Tom Hanks and Mila Kunis were Corden's first guests on March 23, 2015, for the debut episode featuring Corden and Hanks acting and singing their way through a retrospective of Hanks' career. Later, after a prompt by Hanks, Corden appeared to score a coup by getting Mila Kunis to admit that she and Ashton Kutcher are married, but a source later claimed she was merely joking. The episode scored 1.66 million viewers, the show's biggest Monday rating in more than three years.

First-run episodes aired every weeknight through the May 2015 sweeps period; then, beginning the week of May 25, the show scaled back its production schedule to four first-run episodes per week (differing from the previous iterations of the program, which produced Friday episodes, either the day of broadcast or farther in advance on the tape date of the Thursday edition), with the Friday episode consisting of a rebroadcast of a recent episode.

The May 20, 2015, episode, which followed the finale of Late Show with David Letterman, was the highest rated episode of The Late Late Show in the history of the franchise with an audience of 4 million viewers and a rating of 2.5, despite starting 20 minutes late due to Letterman's show running over its scheduled end time. The episode featured Corden and Sting outside of the Ed Sullivan Theater singing "Every Breath You Take" in the show's cold open and a monologue with a Top Ten List among other tributes to Letterman.

On February 28, 2019, Corden helped announce the comeback of the Jonas Brothers by publishing a clip from an upcoming "Carpool Karaoke" segment which features them as guests. A week-long special entitled Late Late Jonas was also announced. The special featured the Jonas Brothers joining James Corden in numerous segments on The Late Late Show Monday, March 4, 2019, through Thursday, March 7, 2019.

In February 2023, it was announced that The Late Late Show with James Corden would air its series finale on April 27, 2023. The episode was preceded by a primetime special, The Last Last Late Late Show Carpool Karaoke Special. The final episode brought together each of Corden's contemporaries on network television: Jimmy Kimmel, Stephen Colbert, Jimmy Fallon, and Seth Meyers, plus David Letterman and former host of The Daily Show Trevor Noah.

== Recurring segments ==
- Carpool Karaoke, a segment in which James and musical guests sing along to their songs whilst driving on a planned route usually in Los Angeles. Corden explained that the segment was inspired by a Gavin & Stacey-themed sketch he had participated in for the British charity television special Red Nose Day 2011, in which he sang along with George Michael in a car, stating that "Ben Winston and I always thought there was something very joyful about someone very, very famous singing their songs in an ordinary situation. We just had this idea: Los Angeles, traffic, the carpool lane — maybe this is something we could pull off." The segments have featured artists such as BTS, Lady Gaga, Foo Fighters, Britney Spears, Jennifer Lopez, Take That, Pink, Chris Martin, Selena Gomez, Jennifer Hudson, Iggy Azalea, Justin Bieber, Stevie Wonder, Shawn Mendes, Gwen Stefani, George Clooney, Julia Roberts, Nick Jonas, Adele, Barbra Streisand, Demi Lovato, Lin-Manuel Miranda, Audra McDonald, Jesse Tyler Ferguson, Jane Krakowski, Elton John, Rod Stewart, A$AP Rocky, Céline Dion, Mariah Carey, Sia, Billie Eilish, One Direction, Harry Styles, Niall Horan, Liam Payne, Louis Tomlinson, Katy Perry, Bruno Mars, Ed Sheeran, Michael Bublé, Ariana Grande, Sam Smith, Fifth Harmony, Chance the Rapper, Migos, Paul McCartney, Madonna, Adam Levine, Christina Aguilera, Usher, Miley Cyrus, Nicki Minaj and the Red Hot Chili Peppers.

These segments have proven popular as viral videos on the Late Late Show's YouTube channel. A Carpool Karaoke segment featuring Adele reached 42 million views within five days, making it the most viral video originating from a late night program since 2013. The Adele segment has received over 263 million views as of February 2024. A segment featuring the then First Lady Michelle Obama (eventually joined by Missy Elliott singing "This is for My Girls") was released on July 20, 2016, and has reached over 83 million views as of February 2024. On March 29, 2016, CBS aired a primetime special featuring highlights of the segment, and a new edition with Jennifer Lopez. The special would win a 2016 Emmy Award for Outstanding Variety Special. On October 29, 2019, a special episode with Kanye West was released which took place in aeroplane hence titled as Airpool Karaoke. In January 2020, a Twitter video went viral that claimed to show that Corden did not drive the car in the segment, instead having it pulled behind another on a trailer. The video has been viewed over 25 million times, leading a producer of the show to state that they only use this method when performing a "stunt". Corden later addressed the issue directly on his show, stating the same reasons his producer previously had, and also providing a list of the times that they had done this.

The popularity of the segment on the Internet led to two different series being produced. In July 2016, it was announced that Apple Music would distribute a series based on Corden's Carpool Karaoke, to be titled Carpool Karaoke: The Series. The decision came after Spike announced plans to air a series inspired by the section, titled Caraoke Showdown, to be hosted by Craig Robinson.

- Drop the Mic: Corden and one or more guests trade insults in a (scripted) rap battle. Guests who participated include David Schwimmer, Rebel Wilson, Cara Delevingne, Dave Franco, Kevin Hart, Anne Hathaway, and Riz Ahmed. In August 2016, TBS ordered a version of Drop the Mic from CBS as a series. It premiered in 2017, with Corden, Ben Winston, and Jensen Karp as producers. It ran until 2019.
- The Bold and the Lyrical: James and multiple celebrity guests act out a dramatic soap opera scene using the lyrics of some of today's biggest acts in music.
- Riff-Off: James challenges a celebrity guest to a vocal battle, with the assistance of Filipino-American a cappella group The Filharmonic. Guests include Anna Kendrick, Shawn Mendes, Neil Patrick Harris, Demi Lovato, Jamie Foxx, Ansel Elgort, Liam Payne, Luke Evans, John Legend, Camila Cabello, and Usher.
- Take a Break: James pretends to do the job of someone in an industry, subsequently "giving them a break." During this segment, James has worked at LensCrafters and Planet Hollywood Resort & Casino, as well as a model on The Price Is Right and the Mayor of Los Angeles, among other jobs.
- Crosswalk the Musical: James and guests hold flash mob-style performances of songs from musicals in the middle of a crosswalk when cars stop at it.
- Aftershows: Over the summer of 2015, when CBS had aired reruns of its drama programming as a lead-in to The Late Late Show to lead up towards the premiere of The Late Show with Stephen Colbert, several episodes featured sketches parodying companion aftershows, such as Talking Mentalist—in which James and his guests would discuss the rerun of The Mentalist that had just aired. The sketch was later reprised as Talking Hawaii Five-0 (which featured a guest appearance by Talking Dead host Chris Hardwick). One episode featured an aftershow for Talking Mentalist entitled Talking Talking Mentalist, hosted by Watts.
- Celebrity Noses: Corden attempts to conduct a game that involves guessing the identities of celebrities based on close-ups of their noses, but is repeatedly stalled by various complications until he runs out of time.
- Spill Your Guts or Fill Your Guts: James and that night's guests join in on a game that involves a roundtable question-and-answer portion. Both of them have the option to answer a really embarrassing, self-deprecating, or controversial question — however, should they choose to not answer the question, they will have to eat various forms of disgusting food, ranging from small insects, bodily fluids, or animal offal or organs. The segment received backlash in June 2021 after Asian-American activist Kim Saira spoke out against the show's use of traditional Asian foods as "disgusting" props. Her Change.org petition demanding the show apologize and cancel or modify the segment has grown to 10,000 supporters.
- Flinch: James and a group of guests participate in a game where pieces of fruit are fired out of a mini remote controlled cannon, designed as Corden's face, towards one of the guests standing behind a plastic wall. Corden usually distracts the guest by asking them questions and then tries to make them flinch by unexpectedly firing a piece of fruit mid-conversation. The winner usually is the one who flinches the least.
- Were You Paying Attention?: Corden asks observation questions to the audience regarding events that had occurred on the show so far; if they answer incorrectly, they are removed from the audience (having to sing "All By Myself" with Corden whilst doing so) and replaced by a "standby" audience member from a lineup outside.
- Honest Headlines: Corden reads headlines from news sources, and then says what he feel would have been a better headline.
- Emoji News: A bizarre news story is represented by emoji, and Corden asks audience members to guess what the story is.
- None of the Above: Corden asks tricky questions to the audience and gives them options for choosing the correct answer to which only the last option which is "None of the Above" is always the correct one. But most of them fail and choose the contrary ones.
- Audience Q&A: A scripted segment in which James allows the audience to ask him some questions about him. The audience members, played by show staff, always ask him irrelevant questions which make him mad.
- Side Effects May Include: James shares the hidden side effects of things you do and people you meet every day.
- Reggie Ruins: With a prextext of a staged demonstration (Like science experiments, clg special effects or ice sculpting) the show's bandleader, comedian and singer Reggie Watts, hacks with his band the segment doing a little musical show that showcase his colorful and funky persona. The segments of the series, all posted on Corden's official YouTube channel, received many positive critical comment, one of this that say "U guys don't get it, ice age is over...its reggie time!".

== Awards and nominations ==
=== Primetime Emmy Awards ===
Year	Category	Nominee(s)	Result	Ref.
2016	Outstanding Variety Talk Series	James Corden, Rob Crabbe, Ben Winston, Mike Gibbons, Sheila Rogers, Michael Kaplan, Jeff Kopp, Josie Cliff and David Javerbaum	Nominated	
2017	Outstanding Variety Talk Series	James Corden, Rob Crabbe, Ben Winston, Mike Gibbons, Sheila Rogers, Michael Kaplan, Jeff Kopp, Josie Cliff and David Javerbaum	Nominated	
2018	Outstanding Variety Talk Series	Ben Winston, Rob Crabbe, Sheila Rogers, Michael Kaplan, Matt Roberts, James Longman, Josie Cliff, Jeff Kopp, James Corden and Diana Miller	Nominated	
2019	Outstanding Variety Talk Series	Ben Winston, Rob Crabbe, James Longman, Sheila Rogers, Josie Cliff, Jeff Kopp, James Corden and Diana Miller	Nominated	

=== Creative Arts Emmy Awards ===
Year	Category	Nominee(s)	Result	Ref.
2016	Outstanding Variety Special	The Late Late Show Carpool Karaoke Primetime Special; Rob Crabbe, Ben Winston, Mike Gibbons, Sheila Rogers, Michael Kaplan, Jeff Kopp, Josie Cliff and James Corden	Won	
2016	Outstanding Directing for a Variety Series	Tim Mancinelli (Episode: "Post-Super Bowl Episode")	Nominated	
2016	Outstanding Interactive Program	James Corden, Ben Winston, Rob Crabbe and Adam Abramson	Won	
2018	Outstanding Directing for a Variety Series	Tim Mancinelli (Episode: "Episode 0416")	Nominated	
2018	Outstanding Interactive Program	James Corden, Ben Winston, Rob Crabbe, Adam Abramson and Tyler White	Nominated	
2018	Outstanding Choreography	Chloe Arnold	Nominated	
2019	Outstanding Interactive Program	James Corden, Ben Winston, Rob Crabbe, Adam Abramson and Tyler White	Nominated	
2019	Outstanding Technical Direction, Camerawork, Video Control for a Series	Oleg Sekulovski, Taylor Campanian, Joel Binger, Scott Daniels, Peter Hutchinson, Michael Jarocki, Adam Margolis, Mark McIntire and Jimmy Verlande (for "Post AFC Championship Show with Chris Pratt and Russell Wilson")	Nominated	

=== Critics' Choice Television Awards ===
Year	Category	Nominee(s)	Result	Ref.
2014	Best Talk Show	The Late Late Show with James Corden	Nominated	
2015	Best Talk Show	The Late Late Show with James Corden	Nominated	
2016	Best Talk Show	The Late Late Show with James Corden	Won	
2017	Best Talk Show	The Late Late Show with James Corden	Nominated	

=== Writers Guild of America Awards ===
Year	Category	Nominee(s)	Result	Ref.
2019	Outstanding Writing in a Comedy/Variety Talk Series	Demi Adejuyigbe, James Corden, Rob Crabbe, Lawrence Dai, Nate Fernald, Caroline Goldfarb, Olivia Harewood, David Javerbaum, Ian Karmel, John Kennedy, Kayleigh Lamb, James Longman, Jared Moskowitz, CeCe Pleasants, Tim Siedell, Benjamin Stout, Tom Thriveni, Louis Waymouth, and Ben Winston	Nominated	

== International broadcast ==
In the UK and Ireland, the show aired at 11:50pm on Sky Comedy on a one-day delay. Since 2016, the show has been available on Sky's 'On Demand' service as well as Now TV with each episode available the day after its American broadcast. Sky Q customers also get to watch some content from the show in the 'Online Video' section. Late Late Show: Best of The Week is also shown Friday nights at 10:00pm on Sky One.

In Canada, The Late Late Show with James Corden is aired by CTV in simulcast with CBS. The program formerly aired on sister network CTV Two, but moved to the main CTV network on February 8, 2016, switching with Late Night with Seth Meyers.

In Australia, the series was purchased by CBS's then-Australian partner network Network Ten. It premiered on Network Ten's sister network Eleven (now 10 Peach) on May 24, 2015, on a seven-day-a-week airing schedule to catch up with the current run through the northern hemisphere summer (by September and the start of the new American television season it had caught up and now airs on a day-delay with repeats at weekends); CBS has owned 10 Peach (and Network Ten itself) since it purchased Ten Network Holdings in the last half of 2017. From September 2020, the show has moved to the newly launched 10 Shake channel. The show returned to 10 Peach in 2021.

In Asia, the show premiered on August 3, 2015, on RTL CBS Entertainment. It broadcasts on weekday nights following The Late Show with Stephen Colbert. Following the sale of the RTL CBS Networks to Canadian-based company Blue Ant Media and subsequent rebranding it to Blue Ant Entertainment in January 2018, the show continued to air until the deal with the show's distributor CBS expired in September 2020.

In Hong Kong, the show had been broadcast at 10:30 p.m. HKT every Friday on ViuTVsix, free-to-air television channel, since April 5, 2019. The show now airs at 9:30 p.m. HKT every Wednesday and Friday on the same channel.

The American Forces Network satellite radio and television service broadcasts the show commercial free to United States military personnel stationed overseas on Prime Atlantic for viewers in Europe and on Prime Pacific for viewers in Asia.
