= One Direction: Where We Are – The Concert Film =

- Theatrical release poster
- Directed by: Paul Dugdale
- Produced by: Jim Parsons
- Starring: Niall Horan; Zayn Malik; Liam Payne; Harry Styles; Louis Tomlinson
- Music by: One Direction
- Production companies: Arts Alliance; Syco Entertainment; Modest Entertainment; Sony Music Entertainment
- Release date: 11 October 2014
- Running time: 96 minutes; 106 minutes (Only in DVD)
- Countries: United Kingdom; United States
- Language: English
- Box office: $15 million

One Direction: Where We Are – The Concert Film, also known as One Direction: Where We Are – Live from San Siro Stadium is the second concert film by English-Irish boy band One Direction and the sequel to One Direction: This Is Us. The film takes place during the 28 and 29 June 2014 shows of the band's Where We Are Tour at San Siro Stadium in Milan, Italy. It contains a 15-minute interview with the band and behind-the-scenes footage.

== Background ==
Initial rumours of a sequel to This Is Us surfaced in April 2014 as Horan, Malik, and Tomlinson were seen being followed by a camera crew during their visit to the Christ the Redeemer in Rio de Janeiro, Brazil; meanwhile Payne and Styles were also followed by a camera crew during their visit to Machu Picchu in the Cusco Region of Peru. On 20 May 2014, the band announced the concert film on their official website with filming taking place by the end of June 2014 during their Where We Are Tour in San Siro Stadium in Milan, to be released on home media in December 2014.

== Promotion ==
On 22 July 2014, the first teaser trailer was posted on the band's YouTube channel announcing the worldwide limited theatrical release for 11 and 12 October 2014 only.

== Release ==
The film was released worldwide on 11 October 2014 and ended showings the next day. The film broke the record for the highest grossing event cinema production with a net total of $4.8 million.

== 2020 Livestream ==
On 28 July 2020, the band's YouTube channel released a livestream of the film as part of the band's 10th anniversary celebration. This video was up for 24 hours.

== Set list ==
1. "Midnight Memories"
2. "Little Black Dress"
3. "Kiss You"
4. "Why Don't We Go There"
5. "Rock Me"
6. "Don't Forget Where You Belong"
7. "Live While We're Young"
8. "C'Mon, C'Mon"
9. "Right Now"
10. "Through The Dark"
11. "Happily"
12. "Little Things"
13. "Moments" (Only in DVD)
14. "Strong" (Only in DVD)
15. "Better Than Words" (Only in DVD)
16. "Alive"
17. "One Thing"
18. "Diana"
19. "What Makes You Beautiful"

Encore

20. "You & I"
21. "Story of My Life"
22. "Little White Lies"
23. "Best Song Ever"

Notes

- Only in DVD

== Certifications ==
Certifications for One Direction: Where We Are – The Concert Film
Region	Certification	Certified units/sales
Australia (ARIA)	4× Platinum	60,000^{^}
Mexico (AMPROFON)	Platinum+Gold	30,000^{^}
Spain (Promusicae)	Gold	10,000^{^}
United Kingdom (BPI)	2× Platinum	100,000^{*}
United States (RIAA)	Platinum	100,000^{^}
^{*} Sales figures based on certification alone.^{^} Shipments figures based on certification alone.
