= On the Road Again Tour =

2015 concert tour by One Direction

- World tour by One Direction
- Promotional poster for the tour used from April 2015
- Location: Africa; Asia; Europe; North America; Oceania
- Associated albums: Four; Made in the A.M.
- Start date: 7 February 2015
- End date: 31 October 2015
- Legs: 8
- No. of shows: 77
- Box office: $208 million ($282.52 million in 2025 dollars)

One Direction concert chronology
- Where We Are Tour (2014); On the Road Again Tour (2015)

The On The Road Again Tour was the fourth and final headlining concert tour, and second all-stadium tour, by English-Irish boy band One Direction, in support of their fourth studio album Four (2014). The tour began on 7 February 2015 in Sydney, Australia and ended on 31 October 2015 in Sheffield, England. accommodate of their fifth studio album Made in the A.M. (2015) The tour grossed $208 million from 77 shows, selling over 2.3 million tickets. It became the second highest-grossing concert tour of 2015, only behind Taylor Swift's The 1989 World Tour.

Less than two months into the tour, Zayn Malik left the band. His last performance with the group was in Hong Kong, on 18 March, while he gave his departure announcement publicly during the band's show in Indonesia on 25 March. The group then continued touring as a foursome, and began recording new material that was released in the latter half of that year. This was also One Direction's last tour before a hiatus began in 2016.

== Background ==
The tour was announced on the Australian breakfast television program Today on 18 May 2014. The group made their debut performance in some countries on this tour. On 19 January 2015, it was announced that Australian pop singer Samantha Jade would be the opening act for the Australian shows, alongside McBusted.

On 19 March 2015, Zayn Malik announced his decision to exit the tour, citing "stress". Six days later, on 25 March, the band announced Malik's decision to permanently exit the group, citing his desire to live a "normal 22-year old life" and that the remaining members would continue as a four-piece group. In a statement, they said:

We're really sad to see Zayn go, but we totally respect his decision and send him all our love for the future. The past five years have been beyond amazing, we've gone through so much together, so we will always be friends. The four of us will now continue. We're looking forward to recording the new album and seeing all the fans on the next stage of the world tour.

On 1 June 2015, the North American leg was officially announced as a part of 14th Annual Honda Civic Tours.

== Set list ==
This set list is representative of the show on 7 February 2015 in Sydney. It is not intended to represent all shows from the tour.

1. "Clouds"
2. "Steal My Girl"
3. "Where Do Broken Hearts Go"
4. "Midnight Memories"
5. "Kiss You"
6. "Fireproof"
7. "Ready to Run"
8. "Happily"
9. "Strong"
10. "Better Than Words"
11. "Don't Forget Where You Belong"
12. "Little Things"
13. "Night Changes"
14. "18"
15. "Alive"
16. "Drag Me Down"
17. "Diana"
18. "One Thing"
19. "No Control"
20. "What Makes You Beautiful"
21. "Through the Dark"
22. "Girl Almighty"
23. "Perfect"
24. "Story of My Life"
25. "You & I"
26. "Act My Age"
27. "Little White Lies"
28. "Little Black Dress"
29. "Stockholm Syndrome"
30. "Best Song Ever"

=== Notes ===
- During the first concert in Sydney and the concert in Perth, the band performed Mark Ronson's Uptown Funk".
- During the second concert in Osaka, the band performed a cover of "Get Lucky" and "Stockholm Syndrome" were added to the set list, while “Happily” was removed.
- During the second concert in Cardiff, the band performed a cover of JLS' "She Makes Me Wanna".
- Starting with the concert in Brussels, "18" and "No Control" were added to the set list and "One Thing" was removed.
- "Strong" was removed from the set list after the Helsinki concert.
- Starting with the concert in San Diego, "Act My Age" was added to the set list of the tour.
- During the concerts in San Diego and Santa Clara, "Spaces" was performed.
- During the concert in Vancouver, Drake's "Started from the Bottom" was performed.
- Starting with the concert in Edmonton, "Fireproof" was added to the set list.
- During the concert in Winnipeg, Liam Payne performed Enrique Iglesias' "Hero".
- During the concert in Indianapolis, "Drag Me Down" was added to the set list of the tour, replacing "Alive".
- During the concert in Detroit, Payne performed "22" in celebration of his 22nd birthday. Horan covered it later for his 22nd birthday, during the show in Foxborough.
- During the concert in Philadelphia, the band performed "The Fresh Prince of Bel Air".
- During the first concert in London "Infinity" was performed briefly due to the band experiencing technical difficulties while performing “Night Changes”.
- During the first concert in Dublin, "Perfect" was added to the set list, replacing "Diana".
- During the second concert in Newcastle, Horan performed an acoustic version of "Home".

== Shows ==
List of 2015 concerts, showing date, city, country, venue, opening act, tickets sold, number of available tickets and amount of gross revenue
Date	City	Country	Venue	Opening act	Attendance	Revenue
7 February 2015	Sydney	Australia	Allianz Stadium	Samantha Jade; McBusted	62,650 / 62,650	$6,657,641
8 February 2015	Sydney	Australia	Allianz Stadium	Samantha Jade; McBusted	62,650 / 62,650	$6,657,641
11 February 2015	Brisbane	Australia	Suncorp Stadium	Samantha Jade; McBusted	34,184 / 34,184	$4,140,017
14 February 2015	Melbourne	Australia	Etihad Stadium	Samantha Jade; McBusted	59,253 / 59,253	$6,219,599
15 February 2015	Melbourne	Australia	Etihad Stadium	Samantha Jade; McBusted	59,253 / 59,253	$6,219,599
17 February 2015	Adelaide	Australia	AAMI Stadium	Samantha Jade; McBusted	27,401 / 27,401	$2,576,710
20 February 2015	Perth	Australia	Domain Stadium	Samantha Jade; McBusted	28,968 / 28,968	$3,229,352
24 February 2015	Osaka	Japan	Osaka Dome	—N/a	79,674 / 79,674	$10,104,690
25 February 2015	Osaka	Japan	Osaka Dome	—N/a	79,674 / 79,674	$10,104,690
27 February 2015	Saitama	Japan	Saitama Super Arena	5 Seconds of Summer	120,328 / 120,328	$18,043,690
28 February 2015	Saitama	Japan	Saitama Super Arena	5 Seconds of Summer	120,328 / 120,328	$18,043,690
1 March 2015	Saitama	Japan	Saitama Super Arena	5 Seconds of Summer	120,328 / 120,328	$18,043,690
2 March 2015	Saitama	Japan	Saitama Super Arena	5 Seconds of Summer	120,328 / 120,328	$18,043,690
11 March 2015	Singapore		National Stadium	DJ Lincey	29,419 / 29,419	$3,630,538
14 March 2015	Bangkok	Thailand	Rajamangala Stadium	DJ Ono	23,078 / 23,078	$2,424,008
18 March 2015 (Note: This was the final show that Zayn Malik performed as part of One Direction. He left the band a week later.)	Hong Kong		AsiaWorld–Arena	DJ Yin	9,673 / 9,673	$2,269,845
21 March 2015	Manila	Philippines	SM Mall of Asia Concert Grounds	DJ Nivram	48,194 / 48,194	$6,472,544
22 March 2015	Manila	Philippines	SM Mall of Asia Concert Grounds	DJ Nivram	48,194 / 48,194	$6,472,544
25 March 2015	Jakarta	Indonesia	Gelora Bung Karno Stadium	CDLC	43,032 / 43,032	$3,537,612
28 March 2015	Johannesburg	South Africa	FNB Stadium	Johnny Apple	131,615 / 131,615	$6,415,302
29 March 2015	Johannesburg	South Africa	FNB Stadium	Johnny Apple	131,615 / 131,615	$6,415,302
1 April 2015	Cape Town	South Africa	Cape Town Stadium	Johnny Apple	51,060 / 51,060	$2,467,188
4 April 2015	Dubai	UAE	The Sevens Stadium	—N/a	29,300 / 29,300	$4,263,314
5 June 2015	Cardiff	Wales	Millennium Stadium	McBusted	112,028 / 112,028	$8,481,805
6 June 2015	Cardiff	Wales	Millennium Stadium	McBusted	112,028 / 112,028	$8,481,805
10 June 2015	Vienna	Austria	Ernst-Happel-Stadion	McBusted	43,232 / 45,000	$2,776,716
13 June 2015	Brussels	Belgium	King Baudouin Stadium	McBusted	56,110 / 56,110	$3,759,949
16 June 2015	Horsens	Denmark	CASA Arena	McBusted	24,623 / 24,623	$1,834,513
19 June 2015	Oslo	Norway	Ullevaal Stadion	McBusted	29,512 / 29,512	$2,905,331
23 June 2015	Gothenburg	Sweden	Ullevi Stadion	McBusted	42,716 / 42,716	$2,938,609
27 June 2015	Helsinki	Finland	Olympiastadion	McBusted	33,325 / 33,325	$2,524,217
9 July 2015	San Diego	United States	Qualcomm Stadium	Icona Pop	52,510 / 52,510	$4,353,534
11 July 2015	Santa Clara	United States	Levi's Stadium	Icona Pop	47,617 / 47,617	$4,531,686
15 July 2015	Seattle	United States	CenturyLink Field	Icona Pop	35,513 / 35,513	$3,026,394
17 July 2015	Vancouver	Canada	BC Place	Icona Pop	28,199 / 28,199	$1,898,145
21 July 2015	Edmonton	Canada	Commonwealth Stadium	Icona Pop	40,989 / 40,989	$3,187,548
24 July 2015	Winnipeg	Canada	Investors Group Field	Icona Pop	24,991 / 24,991	$1,872,194
26 July 2015	Minneapolis	United States	TCF Bank Stadium	Icona Pop	38,323 / 38,323	$3,064,677
28 July 2015	Kansas City	United States	Arrowhead Stadium	Icona Pop	44,801 / 44,801	$3,463,324
31 July 2015	Indianapolis	United States	Lucas Oil Stadium	Icona Pop	42,196 / 42,196	$3,426,589
2 August 2015	Pittsburgh	United States	Heinz Field	Icona Pop	29,323 / 29,323	$2,527,609
5 August 2015	East Rutherford	United States	MetLife Stadium	Icona Pop	56,159 / 56,159	$5,156,858
8 August 2015	Baltimore	United States	M&T Bank Stadium	Icona Pop	41,467 / 41,467	$3,690,753
18 August 2015	Columbus	United States	Ohio Stadium	Icona Pop	31,626 / 31,626	$2,492,794
20 August 2015	Toronto	Canada	Rogers Centre	Icona Pop	47,751 / 47,751	$3,970,683
23 August 2015	Chicago	United States	Soldier Field	Icona Pop	41,527 / 41,527	$3,382,655
25 August 2015	Milwaukee	United States	Miller Park	Icona Pop	37,867 / 37,867	$3,256,963
27 August 2015	Cleveland	United States	FirstEnergy Stadium	Icona Pop	30,282 / 30,282	$2,189,216
29 August 2015	Detroit	United States	Ford Field	Augustana	42,767 / 42,767	$2,700,684
1 September 2015	Philadelphia	United States	Lincoln Financial Field	Icona Pop	47,761 / 47,761	$3,079,651
3 September 2015	Orchard Park	United States	Ralph Wilson Stadium	Icona Pop	38,137 / 38,137	$2,700,736
5 September 2015	Montreal	Canada	Olympic Stadium	Icona Pop	34,151 / 39,250	$2,133,170
8 September 2015	Ottawa	Canada	Canadian Tire Centre	Icona Pop	23,422 / 23,422	$1,682,895
9 September 2015	Ottawa	Canada	Canadian Tire Centre	Icona Pop	23,422 / 23,422	$1,682,895
12 September 2015	Foxborough	United States	Gillette Stadium	Icona Pop	48,167 / 48,167	$4,493,993
24 September 2015	London	England	The O_{2} Arena	Jamie Lawson; Augustana	91,049 / 91,049	$8,645,762
25 September 2015	London	England	The O_{2} Arena	Jamie Lawson; Augustana	91,049 / 91,049	$8,645,762
26 September 2015	London	England	The O_{2} Arena	Jamie Lawson; Augustana	91,049 / 91,049	$8,645,762
28 September 2015	London	England	The O_{2} Arena	Jamie Lawson; Augustana	91,049 / 91,049	$8,645,762
29 September 2015	London	England	The O_{2} Arena	Jamie Lawson; Augustana	91,049 / 91,049	$8,645,762
30 September 2015	London	England	The O_{2} Arena	Jamie Lawson; Augustana	91,049 / 91,049	$8,645,762
3 October 2015	Manchester	England	Manchester Arena	Jamie Lawson; Augustana	28,446 / 28,446	$2,601,978
4 October 2015	Manchester	England	Manchester Arena	Jamie Lawson; Augustana	28,446 / 28,446	$2,601,978
7 October 2015	Glasgow	Scotland	SSE Hydro	Jamie Lawson; Augustana	22,231 / 22,358	$1,986,620
8 October 2015	Glasgow	Scotland	SSE Hydro	Jamie Lawson; Augustana	22,231 / 22,358	$1,986,620
10 October 2015	Birmingham	England	Barclaycard Arena	Jamie Lawson; Augustana	36,780 / 36,780	$2,971,070
11 October 2015	Birmingham	England	Barclaycard Arena	Jamie Lawson; Augustana	36,780 / 36,780	$2,971,070
12 October 2015	Birmingham	England	Barclaycard Arena	Jamie Lawson; Augustana	36,780 / 36,780	$2,971,070
16 October 2015	Dublin	Ireland	3Arena	Jamie Lawson; Augustana	37,193 / 37,193	$3,126,992
17 October 2015	Dublin	Ireland	3Arena	Jamie Lawson; Augustana	37,193 / 37,193	$3,126,992
18 October 2015	Dublin	Ireland	3Arena	Jamie Lawson; Augustana	37,193 / 37,193	$3,126,992
21 October 2015	Belfast	Ireland	Odyssey Arena	Jamie Lawson; Augustana	29,976 / 29,976	$2,821,716
22 October 2015	Belfast	Ireland	Odyssey Arena	Jamie Lawson; Augustana	29,976 / 29,976	$2,821,716
23 October 2015 (Note: The concert of 23 October 2015 in Belfast at the Odyssey Arena was originally planned to take place on 20 October, but was rescheduled due to Liam Payne's illness.)	Belfast	Ireland	Odyssey Arena	Jamie Lawson; Augustana	29,976 / 29,976	$2,821,716
25 October 2015	Newcastle	England	Metro Radio Arena	Jamie Lawson; Augustana	28,746 / 28,746	$2,560,124
26 October 2015	Newcastle	England	Metro Radio Arena	Jamie Lawson; Augustana	28,746 / 28,746	$2,560,124
27 October 2015	Newcastle	England	Metro Radio Arena	Jamie Lawson; Augustana	28,746 / 28,746	$2,560,124
29 October 2015	Sheffield	England	Motorpoint Arena	Jamie Lawson; Augustana	35,748 / 36,972	$3,023,440
30 October 2015	Sheffield	England	Motorpoint Arena	Jamie Lawson; Augustana	35,748 / 36,972	$3,023,440
31 October 2015	Sheffield	England	Motorpoint Arena	Jamie Lawson; Augustana	35,748 / 36,972	$3,023,440
Total					2,335,090 / 2,343,308 (99.65%)	$207,693,643

== Cancelled shows ==
List of cancelled concerts, showing date, city, country, venue and reason for cancellation
Date	City	Country	Venue	Reason
28 June 2015	Helsinki	Finland	Olympiastadion	Scheduling conflict
