= Diana (One Direction song) =

2013 single by One Direction

Promotional single by One Direction

from the album Midnight Memories
- Released: 18 November 2013
- Recorded: 2013
- Genre: Pop; pop rock
- Length: 3:04
- Label: Syco; Columbia
- Songwriters: Brona O’Dowd; Jamie Scott; John Ryan; Louis Tomlinson; Liam Payne
- Producers: Julian Bunetta; John Ryan

"Diana" is a song by English-Irish boy band One Direction from their third studio album Midnight Memories (2013). It was released on 18 November 2013, a week prior to the album's release.

The song debuted at number two on the Irish Singles Chart on 19 November 2013, the day after it was released; it was one of three One Direction songs in the top 10 that week, along with the album's title track "Midnight Memories" (number three) and "Story of My Life" (number six). One Direction performed the song on all two of their major concert tours: Where We Are Tour (2014) and On the Road Again Tour (2015).

== Background ==
"Diana" was leaked onto the internet on 24 September 2013, before it was officially released as the first promotional single from Midnight Memories on 18 November. The song was written by Julian Bunetta, Jamie Scott, John Ryan and band members Louis Tomlinson and Liam Payne. In an interview with MTV News, when Bunetta was asked if the song was named after someone called Diana, he replied "Can't tell! It's definitely about somebody, maybe one day somebody will tell. But we can't tell. I think that the lyric probably pertains to what a lot of the fans are going through and feel... People feel like they're alone and that's what their escape is, Twitter and [finding] people that also relate to them, and everyone finding each other from different parts of the world that are going through the same things." He went on to say, "[I think] it was a kind of a pretty accurate depiction of the loneliness someone can feel in such a huge world and someone saying 'Hey, I feel you. I know you're there. I notice you; it's OK. You're not alone'."

Tomlinson told Perez Hilton's Danielle Sacco for Perez TV that, "We [were] actually working with a few different names for the chorus, and the top name originally was 'Joanna', which is actually quite close to my mum's name, and it felt a little weird so we changed it to Diana." The track features guitar work from Niall Horan, which takes influences from '80s rock.

== Reception ==
"Diana" was met with generally positive responses. Christina Garibaldi of MTV described the song as an "upbeat track," that "seems like it was taken out of the '80s." She compared the track to "Don't Stand So Close to Me" by the Police for its sound and style, as well as "The Boys of Summer" by Don Henley. Rebecca Twomey of Cosmopolitan remarked, "The song has the band's signature romantic style but it showcases their vocal ability too." Chris Payne of Billboard stated that the song shifts "from straight-up pop to more of a pop-rock feel." He also added, "Production-wise, its sound is firmly rooted in modern pop, though this is still a song that plenty of parents of One Direction fans should appreciate."

== Chart performance ==
The day after its release, "Diana" peaked at number 58 on the UK Singles Chart. The song also debuted at number two on the Irish Singles Chart, where it was one of three One Direction songs from Midnight Memories in the top 10, along with the album's title track "Midnight Memories" (number three) and "Story of My Life" (number six). "Diana" debuted on the Billboard Hot 100 at number 11 on 7 December and dropped off the chart the following week. The song peaked at number one on the Denmark Track Top 40 chart and Greece Digital Songs chart. The track topped the iTunes charts worldwide.

== Charts ==
Chart performance for "Diana"
Chart (2013)	Peak position
Australia Digital Tracks (ARIA)	2
Austria (Ö3 Austria Top 40)	21
Belgium (Ultratop 50 Flanders)	3
Belgium (Ultratop 50 Wallonia)	7
Canada Hot 100 (Billboard)	23
Denmark (Tracklisten)	1
Euro Digital Song Sales (Billboard)	3
France (SNEP)	12
Greece Digital Songs (Billboard)	1
Hungary (Single Top 40)	3
Ireland (IRMA)	2
Italy (FIMI)	4
Luxembourg Digital Song Sales (Billboard)	4
Netherlands (Single Top 100)	3
Netherlands (Mega Top 50)	6
New Zealand (Recorded Music NZ)	2
Portugal Digital Song Sales (Billboard)	3
Spain (Promusicae)	3
Sweden (Sverigetopplistan)	55
Switzerland Digital Song Sales (Billboard)	6
UK Singles (Official Charts)	58
US Billboard Hot 100	11

== Certifications ==
Region	Certification	Certified units/sales
New Zealand (RMNZ)	Gold	15,000^{‡}
United Kingdom (BPI)	Silver	200,000^{‡}
^{‡} Sales+streaming figures based on certification alone.
