= Strong (One Direction song) =

2013 single by One Direction

Promotional single by One Direction

from the album Midnight Memories
- Released: 20 November 2013
- Studio: Enemy Dojo (Calabasas, California)
- Length: 3:04
- Label: Syco; Columbia
- Songwriters: Julian Bunetta; John Ryan; Jamie Scott; Louis Tomlinson
- Producers: Julian Bunetta; John Ryan

"Strong" is a song by English-Irish boy band One Direction, taken from their third studio album Midnight Memories (2013). It was released on 20 November 2013. It reached number one in New Zealand, number 15 in Austria and number 44 in Canada. It was written by Julian Bunetta, John Ryan, Jamie Scott, and Louis Tomlinson.

== Background and release ==
"Strong" was written by Louis Tomlinson, John Ryan, Jamie Scott, and Julian Bunetta. In an interview with MTV News, Bunetta said, "We got into this discussion about how when you tell someone like 'I need you, I love you and I need you 'cause you make me strong,' essentially you can scare someone off. It's pressure, so people just kind of run from it. So, that's what the lyric is," recalled Bunetta, who also helped produce songs on the album. "It's saying 'I'm sorry if I say this, but fuck it. And obviously Louis' been in a relationship [with Eleanor Calder] for a long time. It was just sort of a thing that I think all guys feel, having to uphold a man 'I'm strong' philosophy, and kind of throwing that idea out the window."

On 18 November, "Strong" was one of three tracks, along with "Diana" and "Midnight Memories", to be released ahead of the album, which was released the following week.

== Reception ==
Michael Cragg of the Daily Mirror gave "Strong" four out of five stars and wrote: ""My hands, your hands tied up like two ships" sings Zayn to open Strong. I don't think it's about nautical bondage mind you, but more about love and feeling safe with someone that's your soulmate etc. etc. and so on. Again, it's upbeat but quite 'mature', and certainly less teenage than What Makes Your Beautiful. This isn't about a quick fumble, more a recently announced engagement. It's also ridiculously catchy." Writing for Billboard, Chris Payne called the song "a love song in the earnest, mid-tempo vein of previous track "Don't Forget Where You Belong." It's the sort of song plenty of boy bands and well-meaning soft rockers have pulled off before...."

== Chart performance ==
The song reached number one on the Official New Zealand Music Chart, making it One Direction's third number one in New Zealand, after "Live While We're Young" (2012) and "Story of My Life". It also charted at number 48 on the UK Singles Chart, number 87 in the Billboard Hot 100 and number 44 on the Canadian Hot 100.

== Charts ==
Chart performance for "Strong"
| Chart (2013) | Peak position |
|---|---|
| Austria (Ö3 Austria Top 40) | 15 |
| Belgium (Ultratop 50 Flanders) | 6 |
| Belgium (Ultratop 50 Wallonia) | 9 |
| Canada Hot 100 (Billboard) | 44 |
| Denmark (Tracklisten) | 3 |
| Euro Digital Song Sales (Billboard) | 7 |
| France (SNEP) | 15 |
| Germany (GfK) | 24 |
| Greece Digital Songs (Billboard) | 2 |
| Hungary (Single Top 40) | 7 |
| Ireland (IRMA) | 22 |
| Italy (FIMI) | 8 |
| Luxembourg Digital Song Sales (Billboard) | 6 |
| Netherlands (Single Top 100) | 6 |
| New Zealand (Recorded Music NZ) | 1 |
| Portugal Digital Song Sales (Billboard) | 4 |
| South Korea (Gaon) | 166 |
| Spain (Promusicae) | 6 |
| Sweden (Sverigetopplistan) | 58 |
| UK Singles (Official Charts) | 48 |
| US Billboard Hot 100 | 87 |

== See also ==
- List of number-one singles from the 2010s (New Zealand)
