= You & I (One Direction song) =

2014 song by One Direction

Single by One Direction

from the album Midnight Memories
- Released: 18 April 2014
- Recorded: 2013
- Genre: Soft rock
- Length: 3:58
- Label: Syco; Columbia
- Songwriters: Julian Bunetta; Jamie Scott; John Ryan
- Producers: Bunetta; Ryan

One Direction singles chronology
"Midnight Memories" (2014)	"You & I" (2014)	"Steal My Girl" (2014)

Music video
- "You & I" on YouTube

"You & I" is a song recorded by English-Irish boy band One Direction, taken from their third studio album Midnight Memories (2013). It was written by Julian Bunetta, John Ryan and Jamie Scott, with production being handled by Bunetta and Ryan. "You & I" was released as the album's fourth and final single, first impacting US contemporary hit radio on 18 April 2014 by Columbia Records and later being released in Europe on 23 May 2014. An EP containing a remix created by band member Liam Payne was also released.

"You & I" is a soft rock ballad, which received generally favourable reviews from music critics, who named it a "cinematic", "elegant" and more "grown-up" ballad. Commercially, the song managed to reach the top forty in most countries, while it reached the top twenty in the UK and top ten in Ireland. A music video for the song caused controversy due to the 'freeze' on screen being similar to the music video from Australian band Clubfeet. The video won a Brit Award in 2015.

The "You & I" fragrance endorsed by One Direction, named after the song, was released in August 2014.

== Background and release ==
After their successful second album, Take Me Home, which sold over 5 million copies, and their first documentary and concert movie, One Direction: This Is Us, the band announced their third studio album. "[It's a] very rock direction," Liam Payne said. "We actually spent a lot of time writing this album. We're very proud of it, so we can't wait for it to come out. It's very live sounding, very rock-y," he continued, before also describing it as "quite retro". "But it's very different so we are hoping people will kind of adjust to the music with us." One of the album's collaborators, Julian Bunetta, who has worked with the band several times before, including tracks for their 2012 album Take Me Home and their Comic Relief charity single, "One Way or Another (Teenage Kicks)", talked about the album during an interview with MTV News, teasing, "I can't really say, but it’s gonna be pretty cool. I mean it's just... I mean obviously we’re working on new music but they didn’t say what the new music is for. It might be for nothing. It might only be for my ears ... or, it might be something that gets put out for the world to hear." Eventually, Bunetta co-wrote and co-produced nine out of the fourteenth tracks off the standard edition, one of them was "You & I".

After the success of the singles, "Best Song Ever" and "Story of My Life", the band released the album's title track, "Midnight Memories", as its third single. However, the song did not reach the same success of the previous singles. On 11 April 2014, the band announced that "You & I" was to be the fourth single, with band member Harry Styles claiming, "This one is for you, so we hope you like." The single was released on 25 May, accompanied by an EP, which includes a remix by band member Liam Payne called the 'Big Payno' mix, as well as a piano and duet version of the song.

== Composition and lyrics ==
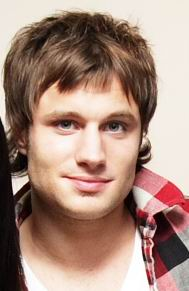
"You & I" was co-written by Jamie Scott.

"You & I" was written by Julian Bunneta, John Ryan and Jamie Scott, with Bunneta and Ryan also serving as the song's producers and engineers. It was recorded at the Enemy Dojo, Calabasas (LA, California) and mixed at The Dark Room. "You & I" is a rousing guitar-led track. Lyrically, it is a declaration of defiance, where the band sings, "You and I, we don't want to be like them. We can make it to the end. Nothing can come between you and I. Not even the gods above can separate the two of us".

== Critical reception ==
The song received generally favourable reviews from music critics. Chris Payne (no relation to member Liam Payne) of Billboard called it a "slow jam, which sounds ready to get middle school gyms in a slowdance frenzy." Michael Cragg of Mirror described the song as "a delicate, acoustic guitar-lead ballad that sounds very 'adult'" and likened it to the work of Snow Patrol. Tim Sendra of AllMusic called it a "cinematically swoony ballad" that "shows the group have a sure-handed way with a big ballad and can tap into some real emotion." Annie Zaleski of The A.V. Club agreed, writing that "to handle more grown-up songs, their voices have matured and deepened enough," citing the "syrupy soft rock ballad" "You and I" as an example.

Melinda Newman of HitFix named it an "elegant ballad that will have the long time fans waving their cell phones in the air," also noting that it "could be massive". Mikael Wood of the Los Angeles Times remarked that the song "could be a cover of Bryan Adams' early-'80s ballad 'Heaven'."

== Commercial performance ==
On 1 December 2013, "You & I" debuted at number 19 on the UK Singles Chart, due to strong digital downloads after the release of Midnight Memories. Later, the song re-entered at number 49, on 27 April 2014, after the release of its music video, becoming that week "best comeback". The song kept on climbing the following weeks, until it reached number 44, on 11 May 2014. However, after the official release as a single, the song climbed to number 22. In Ireland, the song also debuted after the release of the album, charting at number 45, on the week ending 28 November 2013. Similar to the UK, it re-entered at number 47, after the music video's release, before climbing from number 33 to number 7, after its official release. It became the band's eleventh top-ten single there.

Elsewhere, the song performed moderately on the charts. In Australia, the song debuted and peaked at number 23, while in New Zealand, it reached number 22. It reached the top-twenty in Spain, where it peaked at number 13, but became their first single since their debut, "What Makes You Beautiful" (2011), to miss the top-ten, while in France, the song only managed to reach number 42, after the album's release. In the United States, "You & I" debuted and peaked at number 68, on the week ending 3 May 2014. However, it became the band's lowest charting-single there. As of December 2014, the single sold 382,000 copies in the country.

== Music video ==
=== Background and synopsis ===
The music video was shot on Clevedon Pier and directed by longtime collaborator Ben Winston and was released on 18 April 2014. The video was not actually recorded in one shot, but rather was edited together to appear as if it was. The video sees the band members morphing into each other while walking along the Clevedon Pier in Somerset as they trade lead vocals. As the music video proceeds, they continue walking down the pier and collect stop motion images of themselves.

One Direction was honoured with a brass plaque from the pier, commemorating their music video shoot. In February 2015, the video won the British Video award at the 2015 Brit Awards.

=== Reception and controversy ===
Carl Williot of Idolator thought that "It's a cool idea, giving the illusion that it's a single-take visual, while obviously bringing to mind the iconic closing scene in Michael Jackson's 'Black or White'." Louis Virtel of HitFix called it "weird and scary."

The video garnered controversy as it appears to plagiarise Australian band Clubfeet's video for "Everything You Wanted". Australian production company OhYeahWow declared in a statement on its blog: "It seems that the chaps of One Direction have taken it upon themselves to regurgitate our original concept. Don't get us wrong, we here at Oh Yeah Wow are big One Direction fans and are envious of their ability to maintain flawless hairdos."

== Track listing ==
CD single / digital download EP
No.	Title	Producer(s)	Length
1.	"You & I" (radio edit)	Julian Bunetta; John Ryan	3:49
2.	"You & I" (Big Payno remix)	Liam Payne^{[a]}; Bunetta^{[a]}; Pete Hammerton^{[a]}	3:22
3.	"You & I" (duet version)	Bunetta; Ryan	4:02
4.	"You & I" (piano version)	Bunetta; Ryan	3:42

iTunes Store additional track
No.	Title	Length
5.	"A Message from One Direction" (video) (pre-order only)	1:18

Notes

- ^{^[a]} signifies a remixer

== Charts ==
2013–14 weekly chart performance for "You & I"
Chart (2013–14)	Peak position
Australia (ARIA)	23
Austria (Ö3 Austria Top 40)	35
Belgium (Ultratop 50 Flanders)	17
Belgium (Ultratop 50 Wallonia)	20
Brazil (Billboard Brasil Hot 100)	41
Canada Hot 100 (Billboard)	78
Denmark (Tracklisten)	38
Euro Digital Song Sales (Billboard)	14
France (SNEP)	42
Germany (GfK)	52
Greece Digital Songs (Billboard)	5
Ireland (IRMA)	7
Italy (FIMI)	20
Netherlands (Dutch Top 40 Tipparade)	17
Netherlands (Single Top 100)	32
New Zealand (Recorded Music NZ)	22
South Korea (Gaon)	93
Scottish Singles Sales (Official Charts)	17
Spain (Promusicae)	13
Sweden (Sverigetopplistan)	21
Switzerland (Schweizer Hitparade)	23
UK Singles (Official Charts)	19
US Billboard Hot 100	68
US Adult Pop Airplay (Billboard)	32
US Pop Airplay (Billboard)	21

2024 weekly chart performance for "You & I"
Chart (2024)	Peak position
Global 200 (Billboard)	193
Philippines (Philippines Hot 100)	98

== Certifications ==
Region	Certification	Certified units/sales
Australia (ARIA)	Platinum	70,000^{‡}
Canada (Music Canada)	Platinum	80,000^{‡}
Denmark (IFPI Danmark)	Platinum	90,000^{‡}
Italy (FIMI)	Gold	25,000^{‡}
Mexico (AMPROFON)	2× Platinum	120,000^{‡}
New Zealand (RMNZ)	Platinum	30,000^{‡}
Spain (Promusicae)	Gold	30,000^{‡}
United Kingdom (BPI)	Platinum	600,000^{‡}
^{‡} Sales+streaming figures based on certification alone.

== Release history ==
Region	Date	Format	Label
United States	15 April 2014	Contemporary hit radio	Columbia Records
Italy	18 April 2014	Contemporary hit radio	Syco Music
Netherlands	23 May 2014	Digital download	Syco Music
Germany	23 May 2014	Digital download	Syco Music
Ireland	23 May 2014	Digital download	Syco Music
United Kingdom	25 May 2014	Digital download	Syco Music
