= Where We Are Tour (One Direction) =

2014 concert tour by One Direction

- Tour by One Direction
- UK Promotional poster
- Location: Europe; North America; South America
- Associated album: Midnight Memories
- Start date: 25 April 2014
- End date: 5 October 2014
- Legs: 3
- No. of shows: 69
- Box office: $290.2 million ($394.67 million in 2025 dollars)

One Direction concert chronology
- Take Me Home Tour (2013); Where We Are Tour (2014); On the Road Again Tour (2015)

The Where We Are Tour was the third headlining concert tour by English-Irish boy band One Direction, in support of their third studio album, Midnight Memories (2013). It marks the group's first all-stadium tour with an average attendance of 49,848. The tour began on 25 April 2014 in Bogotá, Colombia and concluded on 5 October 2014 in Miami, Florida. Australian pop rock band, 5 Seconds of Summer, served as the opening act for the European and North American dates.

The tour was the highest-grossing tour of 2014. It is One Direction's most attended and highest-grossing tour to date, mobilising 3,439,560 fans and $290,178,452 in revenue. This is the band's last full-length tour with band member Zayn Malik, before his departure during On the Road Again Tour in 2015.

== Development ==
On 16 May 2013, the tour was announced by One Direction during a press conference at Wembley Stadium, during which the band revealed their first stadium tour would kickoff in Colombia in April 2014, with dates being announced for South America, UK, and Ireland. At the event, band member Louis Tomlinson described their upcoming album as being "rockier" and "edgier" than the music they have previously released.

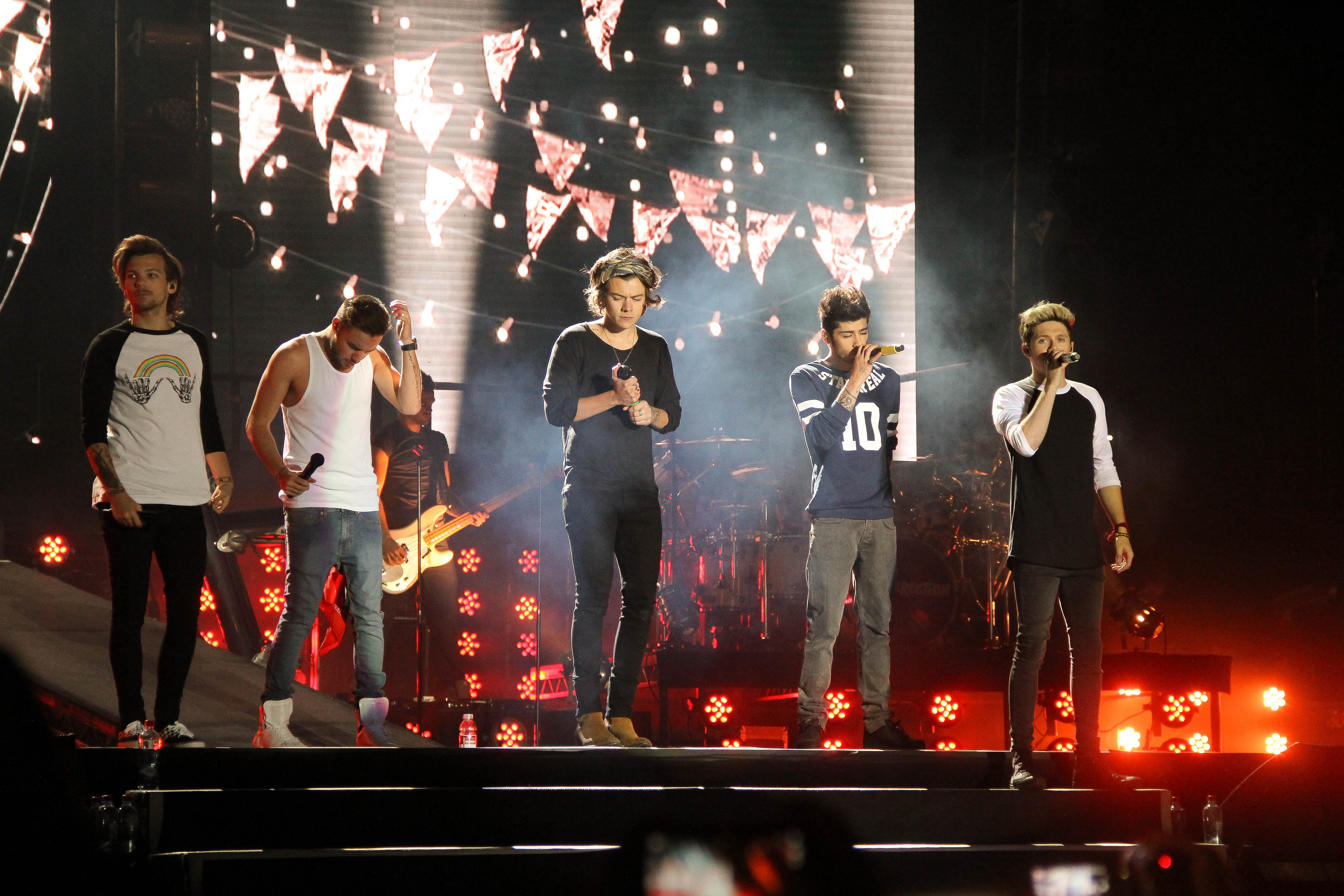
One Direction on stage in Santiago, Chile

Tickets for 8 shows in the UK and Ireland went on sale on 25 May 2013, with several dates selling out in minutes, leading to extra show dates being announced. All tickets from the first show of the tour in Bogotá sold out in one day, nearly a year prior to the concert date. On 19 September, 10 shows for the European leg were announced and additional shows in Dublin, Manchester, and London were added, with tickets going on sale the following week on 28 September.

During an appearance on Good Morning America on 26 November 2013 to promote the release of their third album, the band announced 21 dates for the North American leg of the tour, with tickets going on sale on 7 December.

In March 2014, the Australian pop rock band, 5 Seconds of Summer, was announced as the opening act for the European and North American dates, having previously opened for One Direction during their Take Me Home Tour the year before. In the midst of their tour, the band performed at BBC Radio 1's Big Weekend in Glasgow on 24 May 2014, and flew back to Dublin the same day for their second show at Croke Park that night. They also opened the second night of the iHeartRadio Music Festival on 20 September, at the MGM Grand Garden Arena in Las Vegas. In June 2014, it was reported that One Direction had raised £600,000 for the UK charity Stand Up to Cancer, after donating 50p for each ticket sold from their UK and Ireland tour to the charity.

== Recording ==
The 28 and 29 June 2014 shows at San Siro in Milan, Italy were recorded into a concert film. The film was released on 11 and 12 October 2014 in select theatres worldwide before its home media release. The theatrical version had a runtime of 96 minutes. It was released on DVD in December 2014, and features the entire concert and additional content including backstage footage.

== Set list ==
This set list is representative of the show on 25 April 2014 in Bogotá. It is not representative of all concerts for the duration of the tour.

1. "Midnight Memories"
2. "Little Black Dress"
3. "Kiss You"
4. "Why Don't We Go There"
5. "Rock Me"
6. "Don't Forget Where You Belong"
7. "Live While We're Young"
8. "C'mon, C'mon"
9. "Right Now"
10. "Through the Dark"
11. "Happily"
12. "Little Things"
13. "Moments"
14. "Strong"
15. "Better Than Words"
16. "Alive"
17. "One Thing"
18. "Diana"
19. "What Makes You Beautiful"

Encore

20. "You & I"
21. "Story of My Life"
22. "Little White Lies"
23. "Best Song Ever"

=== Notes ===
- During the performance in Stockholm on 14 June, the band performed a cover of "Mamma Mia" by ABBA.
- During the performances in Saint-Denis on 20-21 June, the band performed a cover of "Get Lucky" by Daft Punk & Pharrell Williams.
- During the performances in Philadelphia on 13-14 August, the band performed a cover of "The Fresh Prince of Bel Air" by Will Smith.
- During the performance in Detroit on 16 August, the band performed a cover of "Teenage Dirtbag" by Wheatus.
- During the performance in Nashville on 19 August, the band performed a cover of "9 to 5" by Dolly Parton.
- During the performance in Chicago on 29 August, the band performed "Happy Birthday" by Mildred J. Hill dedicated to Payne, and "The Way You Make Me Feel" by Michael Jackson.
- During the performance in Pasadena on 13 September, the band performed "Happy Birthday" dedicated to Horan; and "I Gotta Feeling" by The Black Eyed Peas, "Beautiful Girls" by Sean Kingston, "Stand by Me" by Ben E. King and "Rock Your Body" by Justin Timberlake, along with a snippet of the band's own song "I Want".
- During the performance in Charlotte on 28 September, Horan performed "Naive" by The Kooks.
- During the performance in Atlanta on 1 October, the band performed a cover of "Use Somebody" by Kings of Leon.

== Shows ==
List of 2014 concerts, showing date, city, country, venue, opening act, tickets sold, number of available tickets, and gross revenue
Date	City	Country	Venue	Opening act	Attendance	Revenue
25 April 2014	Bogotá	Colombia	Estadio El Campín	El Freaky	34,935 / 34,935	$4,727,910
27 April 2014	Lima	Peru	Estadio Nacional	Abraham Mateo	32,601 / 32,601	$3,362,870
30 April 2014	Santiago	Chile	Estadio Nacional	Abraham Mateo	87,324 / 87,324	$7,688,500
1 May 2014	Santiago	Chile	Estadio Nacional	Abraham Mateo	87,324 / 87,324	$7,688,500
3 May 2014	Buenos Aires	Argentina	José Amalfitani Stadium	Sonus	80,622 / 80,622	$5,682,760
4 May 2014	Buenos Aires	Argentina	José Amalfitani Stadium	Sonus	80,622 / 80,622	$5,682,760
6 May 2014	Montevideo	Uruguay	Estadio Centenario	Sonus	30,958 / 30,958	$2,316,460
8 May 2014	Rio de Janeiro	Brazil	Parque dos Atletas	P9	40,087 / 40,087	$3,826,760
10 May 2014	São Paulo	Brazil	Estádio do Morumbi	P9	102,792 / 102,792	$9,457,730
11 May 2014	São Paulo	Brazil	Estádio do Morumbi	P9	102,792 / 102,792	$9,457,730
23 May 2014	Dublin	Ireland	Croke Park	5 Seconds of Summer	235,008 / 235,008	$20,115,900
24 May 2014	Dublin	Ireland	Croke Park	5 Seconds of Summer	235,008 / 235,008	$20,115,900
25 May 2014	Dublin	Ireland	Croke Park	5 Seconds of Summer	235,008 / 235,008	$20,115,900
28 May 2014	Sunderland	England	Stadium of Light	5 Seconds of Summer	51,231 / 51,231	$4,383,490
30 May 2014	Manchester	England	City of Manchester Stadium	5 Seconds of Summer	158,579 / 158,579	$12,908,000
31 May 2014	Manchester	England	City of Manchester Stadium	5 Seconds of Summer	158,579 / 158,579	$12,908,000
1 June 2014	Manchester	England	City of Manchester Stadium	5 Seconds of Summer	158,579 / 158,579	$12,908,000
3 June 2014	Edinburgh	Scotland	Murrayfield Stadium	5 Seconds of Summer	64,623 / 64,623	$5,297,750
6 June 2014	London	England	Wembley Stadium	5 Seconds of Summer	236,566 / 236,566	$20,017,900
7 June 2014	London	England	Wembley Stadium	5 Seconds of Summer	236,566 / 236,566	$20,017,900
8 June 2014	London	England	Wembley Stadium	5 Seconds of Summer	236,566 / 236,566	$20,017,900
13 June 2014	Stockholm	Sweden	Friends Arena	5 Seconds of Summer	88,978 / 88,978	$7,358,040
14 June 2014	Stockholm	Sweden	Friends Arena	5 Seconds of Summer	88,978 / 88,978	$7,358,040
16 June 2014	Copenhagen	Denmark	Parken Stadium	McBusted	83,577 / 83,577	$8,190,650
17 June 2014	Copenhagen	Denmark	Parken Stadium	McBusted	83,577 / 83,577	$8,190,650
20 June 2014	Saint-Denis	France	Stade de France	5 Seconds of Summer; McBusted	114,172 / 114,172	$9,775,550
21 June 2014	Saint-Denis	France	Stade de France	5 Seconds of Summer; McBusted	114,172 / 114,172	$9,775,550
24 June 2014	Amsterdam	Netherlands	Amsterdam Arena	5 Seconds of Summer	103,551 / 103,551	$7,859,850
25 June 2014	Amsterdam	Netherlands	Amsterdam Arena	5 Seconds of Summer	103,551 / 103,551	$7,859,850
28 June 2014	Milan	Italy	San Siro	5 Seconds of Summer	115,931 / 115,931	$7,779,190
29 June 2014	Milan	Italy	San Siro	5 Seconds of Summer	115,931 / 115,931	$7,779,190
2 July 2014	Düsseldorf	Germany	Esprit Arena	5 Seconds of Summer	44,684 / 44,684	$3,395,490
4 July 2014	Bern	Switzerland	Stade de Suisse	5 Seconds of Summer	31,037 / 31,037	$3,150,110
6 July 2014	Turin	Italy	Stadio Olimpico	5 Seconds of Summer	38,430 / 38,430	$3,294,610
8 July 2014	Barcelona	Spain	Estadi Olímpic Lluís Companys	5 Seconds of Summer; Abraham Mateo	40,333 / 40,333	$3,391,560
10 July 2014	Madrid	Spain	Estadio Vicente Calderón	5 Seconds of Summer; Abraham Mateo	65,186 / 65,186	$5,409,230
11 July 2014	Madrid	Spain	Estadio Vicente Calderón	5 Seconds of Summer; Abraham Mateo	65,186 / 65,186	$5,409,230
13 July 2014	Porto	Portugal	Estádio do Dragão	D.A.M.A	45,001 / 45,001	$3,868,070
1 August 2014	Toronto	Canada	Rogers Centre	5 Seconds of Summer	98,851 / 98,851	$6,634,920
2 August 2014	Toronto	Canada	Rogers Centre	5 Seconds of Summer	98,851 / 98,851	$6,634,920
4 August 2014	East Rutherford	United States	MetLife Stadium	5 Seconds of Summer	139,247 / 139,247	$12,345,803
5 August 2014	East Rutherford	United States	MetLife Stadium	5 Seconds of Summer	139,247 / 139,247	$12,345,803
7 August 2014	Foxborough	United States	Gillette Stadium	5 Seconds of Summer	148,251 / 148,251	$13,475,239
8 August 2014	Foxborough	United States	Gillette Stadium	5 Seconds of Summer	148,251 / 148,251	$13,475,239
9 August 2014	Foxborough	United States	Gillette Stadium	5 Seconds of Summer	148,251 / 148,251	$13,475,239
11 August 2014	Washington, D.C.	United States	Nationals Park	5 Seconds of Summer	42,834 / 42,834	$4,233,063
13 August 2014	Philadelphia	United States	Lincoln Financial Field	5 Seconds of Summer	101,527 / 101,527	$8,818,556
14 August 2014	Philadelphia	United States	Lincoln Financial Field	5 Seconds of Summer	101,527 / 101,527	$8,818,556
16 August 2014	Detroit	United States	Ford Field	5 Seconds of Summer	92,428 / 92,428	$8,304,416
17 August 2014	Detroit	United States	Ford Field	5 Seconds of Summer	92,428 / 92,428	$8,304,416
19 August 2014	Nashville	United States	LP Field	5 Seconds of Summer	53,472 / 53,472	$4,286,308
22 August 2014	Houston	United States	Reliant Stadium	5 Seconds of Summer	55,703 / 55,703	$4,659,939
24 August 2014	Arlington	United States	AT&T Stadium	Jamie Scott	51,074 / 51,074	$4,517,012
27 August 2014	St. Louis	United States	Edward Jones Dome	Jamie Scott	52,315 / 52,315	$4,281,608
29 August 2014	Chicago	United States	Soldier Field	5 Seconds of Summer	104,617 / 104,617	$9,446,247
30 August 2014	Chicago	United States	Soldier Field	5 Seconds of Summer	104,617 / 104,617	$9,446,247
11 September 2014	Pasadena	United States	Rose Bowl	5 Seconds of Summer; Jamie Scott	165,170 / 165,170	$12,560,382
12 September 2014	Pasadena	United States	Rose Bowl	5 Seconds of Summer; Jamie Scott	165,170 / 165,170	$12,560,382
13 September 2014	Pasadena	United States	Rose Bowl	5 Seconds of Summer; Jamie Scott	165,170 / 165,170	$12,560,382
16 September 2014	Glendale	United States	University of Phoenix Stadium	5 Seconds of Summer	56,524 / 56,524	$5,035,880
19 September 2014	El Paso	United States	Sun Bowl	5 Seconds of Summer	44,910 / 44,910	$3,632,097
21 September 2014	San Antonio	United States	Alamodome	5 Seconds of Summer	51,575 / 51,575	$4,237,714
23 September 2014	Tulsa	United States	BOK Center	5 Seconds of Summer	10,100 / 10,100	$1,012,051
25 September 2014	New Orleans	United States	Mercedes-Benz Superdome	5 Seconds of Summer	50,349 / 50,349	$4,258,450
27 September 2014	Charlotte	United States	PNC Music Pavilion	5 Seconds of Summer	37,365 / 37,365	$2,378,580
28 September 2014	Charlotte	United States	PNC Music Pavilion	5 Seconds of Summer	37,365 / 37,365	$2,378,580
1 October 2014	Atlanta	United States	Georgia Dome	5 Seconds of Summer	50,970 / 50,970	$4,438,203
3 October 2014	Tampa	United States	Raymond James Stadium	5 Seconds of Summer	52,158 / 52,158	$4,359,855
5 October 2014	Miami Gardens	United States	Sun Life Stadium	5 Seconds of Summer	53,914 / 53,914	$4,303,749
Total					3,439,560 / 3,439,560 (100%)	$290,178,452

=== Cancelled shows ===
List of cancelled concerts, showing date, city, country, venue and reason for cancellation
Date	City	Country	Venue	Reason
29 April 2014	Asunción	Paraguay	Jockey Club	Logistic reasons

== See also ==
- List of highest-grossing concert tours
- List of most-attended concert tours
