= When Will I See Your Face Again =

Single by Jamie Scott and the Town

from the album Park Bench Theories
- Released: 2007
- Genre: Indie, pop
- Length: 4:23
- Songwriter(s): Unknown

Jamie Scott and the Town singles chronology
"Searching" (2007)	"When Will I See Your Face Again" (2007)	"Standing In the Rain" (2008)

"When Will I See Your Face Again" is the first single from the Jamie Scott and the Town album Park Bench Theories. The lyrics reflect on lost love: the singer fears losing contact with the one he loves; despite the fact that she promises to come back to him, she didn't, and he is wondering "When Will I See Your Face Again".

== Chart positions ==
Chart (2007)	Peak position
Danish Download Chart	8
UK Singles Chart	41
