= Park Bench Theories =

Studio album by Jamie Scott and the Town
- Released: 2007
- Genre: Rock
- Label: Polydor

Professional ratings
Review scores
Source	Rating
AllMusic	4/5 stars
Irish Independent	4/5

Park Bench Theories is an album by Jamie Scott and the Town, released in 2007.

== Production ==
Scott was backed by the band Travis, minus frontman Fran Healy.

== Critical reception ==
AllMusic wrote that "the album's most powerful weapon is Scott himself, whose wondrous jazz-soul tones, part John Mayer, part Jeff Buckley, part Stevie Wonder, are able to elevate the occasionally bland and samey production into an engaging listen." The Guardian called the album "something of a supper-club Blood On The Tracks, being a series of diary entries about Scott's ugly bust-up with his ex-missus." The Irish Independent wrote that "superb echoey piano keys, accompanied by haunting string arrangements, make 'Shadows' the album's standout track."

== Track listing ==
1. Runaway Train
2. When Will I See Your Face Again
3. London Town
4. Changes
5. Shadows
6. Standing In The Rain
7. Love Song To Remember
8. Weeping Willow
9. Two Men
10. Rise Up
11. Hey You
12. Lady West
13. Untitled
