= River Matthews =

- Origin: Woking, Surrey, England
- Genres: Indie, acoustic, alternative, rock, folk
- Years active: 2016–2018
- Labels: Catherine Records and Nettwerk Music Group
- Website: http://www.rivermatthews.com/

River Matthews is an English singer/songwriter from Woking, Surrey, England. He is signed to songwriter/producer Jamie Scott's label Catherine Records in partnership with Nettwerk Music Group.

In 2016, Matthews released his debut EP “Feels Like Morning” and In April 2017 the track “Stars” picked up BBC Radio 2 support with Jo Whiley making it her 'New Favourite Thing'. The first single "Sunshine" to be taken from his follow up EP of the same name has recently been B-Listed by BBC Radio 2.

In 2016, Matthews supported Rag'n'Bone Man on five of his UK dates and supported Coasts on the UK leg of their tour in May 2017. He sold out St Pancras Old Church in July 2017 and undertook the 'Feels Like Morning' headline tour in November 2017.

Matthews released his debut album Imogen in 2018.

== Discography ==
=== "Feels Like Morning" (EP) ===
- "Over"
- "Feels Like Morning"
- "Stars"
- "Catherine"

=== "Sunshine" (EP) ===
- "Sunshine"
- "Undo Ordinary"
- "Light The Way"
- "It Must Have Been Love"

=== Imogen (2018) ===
- "Sunshine"
- "Undo Ordinary"
- "Feels Like Morning"
- "Fool For You"
- "Pretty Things"
- "Butterflies"
- "Over"
- "Never"
- "Bye Bye Bird"
- "Stars"
- "House of The Rising Sun"
