= One Way or Another =

1979 single by Blondie

- Side-A label of U.S. vinyl single

Single by Blondie

from the album Parallel Lines
- B-side: "Just Go Away"
- Released: May 1979
- Recorded: June–July 1978
- Studio: Record Plant (New York City)
- Genre: Punk rock; new wave; power pop; pop-punk
- Length: 3:31
- Label: Chrysalis (US)
- Songwriters: Debbie Harry; Nigel Harrison
- Producer: Mike Chapman

Blondie singles chronology
"Sunday Girl" (1979)	"One Way or Another" (1979)	"Dreaming" (1979)

Audio sample
- file; help

Music video
- "One Way or Another" (TopPop, 1978) on YouTube

"One Way or Another" is a song by American rock band Blondie from their 1978 album Parallel Lines. Lyrically, the song was inspired by Blondie frontwoman Debbie Harry's experience with a stalker in the early 1970s, an incident which forced her to move away from New Jersey. Harry wrote the lyrics as if an 'ex-boyfriend' was stalking her, to give the song an element of humour. The song's music was composed by bassist Nigel Harrison, who introduced the Ventures-influenced track to keyboardist Jimmy Destri.

"One Way or Another" was released as the fourth North American single from Parallel Lines, following the band's chart-topping "Heart of Glass" single. The song reached number 24 in the US and number 7 in Canada. It was not released as a single in the UK, but later charted in 2013, along with a cover by British band One Direction (in medley with The Undertones' "Teenage Kicks") for Comic Relief, with the latter reaching number 1.

"One Way or Another" has since seen critical acclaim for Harry's aggressive vocals and Blondie's energetic performance. It has been ranked by many critics as one of the band's best songs and has appeared on several compilation albums.

== Background ==
Written by Debbie Harry and Nigel Harrison for the band's third studio album, Parallel Lines (1978), "One Way or Another" was inspired by one of Harry's ex-boyfriends who stalked her after their breakup. According to Harry, the boyfriend's constant calling and persistent stalking forced her to move out of New Jersey. The stalking had taken place in 1973, when Harry was a member of The Stilettos; Harry's former bandmate Elda Gentile recalled, "It was freaking us all out, especially Chris [Stein]". Harry explained in an interview with Entertainment Weekly:

I was actually stalked by a nutjob so it came out of a not-so-friendly personal event. But I tried to inject a little bit of levity into it to make it more lighthearted. I think in a way that's a normal kind of survival mechanism. You know, just shake it off, say one way or another, and get on with your life. Everyone can relate to that and I think that's the beauty of it.

Musically, the song was composed by bassist Nigel Harrison, who first introduced the song to keyboardist Jimmy Destri. He explained, "My original music for 'One Way or Another' was this psychedelic, Ventures-like futuristic surf song gone wrong. Jimmy [Destri] really liked this piece of music, and we would play it on the road. Then Debbie picked up on it; she came up with the 'getcha-getcha-getcha's'". Harry later claimed to have worked out the song live with Harrison. The song was recorded between June and July 1978 at New York's Record Plant studio. According to Harrison, producer Mike Chapman came up with the chaotic ending section.

== Release ==
"One Way or Another" was released as the fourth single from Parallel Lines in the US and Canada, as the follow-up to the number 1 hit "Heart of Glass". "One Way or Another" reached number 24 on the Billboard Hot 100 and number 7 on the RPM 100 Singles. Although never officially released as a single in the United Kingdom, the song charted there from download sales in February 2013 due to the success of One Direction's cover "One Way or Another (Teenage Kicks)". Adam Boult of The Guardian considered this version of the song to be an "abomination".

In addition to its appearance on Parallel Lines, the song was included on the US and Canadian versions of the band's first hits compilation, The Best of Blondie (1981), as it was released as a single there, but not on the international releases. It has since appeared on multiple other compilations, including a re-recorded version on 2014's Blondie 4(0) Ever.

Blondie released a manipulated live version of the song (with the audience noise removed) as the theme for the 1999 US television series Snoops. This version was released in the US as a bonus track on the Live live album. The original un-edited live version was later included on the European edition of Live, which was re-titled Livid, instead of the manipulated one. Harry has since noted the song as a live favorite, recalling concerts where the crowd would point back at her and sing along.

== Reception ==
Since its release, "One Way or Another" has seen critical acclaim. Billboard said that "One Way or Another" as "moves in machine gun fashion as Debbie Harry's vocal sounds almost demonic." Cash Box noted the "gritty fuzz guitar," "pummelling drum beat," "slightly quirky" beat, "engaging bass line" and said that "Harry's slinky vocals are delivered with playful aggressiveness." Pitchfork praised the song as "exuberant new wave, far looser than the stiff, herky-jerky tracks that would go on to characterize that sound in the 80s," while Louder said of the track, "It was the song that took them from the punk clubs of New York to the arenas of the world, and cemented Debbie Harry's status as rock's foremost badass." Rolling Stone ranked the song at number 298 on its list of the 500 Greatest Songs of All Time.

Paste ranked the song as the second greatest Blondie song, writing that the song "stands as one of the best songs—by Blondie or anyone else—of all time." Billboard ranked it as the band's fifth best song, while Ultimate Classic Rock named it as the band's sixth best, writing, "From the opening stabbing guitar riff to the song's wailing, chaotic finale, 'One Way or Another' is the sound of a great band earning its rep." The Independent named it as the band's ninth best.

== Track listing ==
US 7" (CHS 2336)

1. "One Way or Another" (Nigel Harrison, Debbie Harry) – 3:31
2. "Just Go Away" (Harry) – 3:21

US 12" promo (CHS 10 PDJ)

1. "One Way or Another" (Harrison, Harry) – 3:31

== Charts ==
=== Weekly charts ===
Chart (1979)	Peak position
Canada Adult Contemporary (RPM)	8
Canada Top Singles (RPM)	7
US Billboard Hot 100	24

Chart (2013)	Peak position
UK Singles (OCC)	98
France (SNEP)	174

Chart (2022)	Peak position
Hungary (Single Top 40)	35

=== Year-end charts ===
Chart (1979)	Rank
Canada Top Singles (RPM)	61

== Certifications ==
Region	Certification	Certified units/sales
New Zealand (RMNZ)	2× Platinum	60,000^{‡}
Spain (Promusicae)	Gold	30,000^{‡}
United Kingdom (BPI)	Platinum	600,000^{‡}
^{‡} Sales+streaming figures based on certification alone.

== One Direction version ==
"One Way or Another (Teenage Kicks)"

Single by One Direction

from the album Midnight Memories (Japanese edition)
- Released: February 17, 2013
- Recorded: 2012
- Genre: Pop rock
- Length: 2:37
- Label: Syco
- Songwriters: Debbie Harry; Nigel Harrison; John O'Neill
- Producers: Julian Bunetta; John Ryan

One Direction singles chronology
"Kiss You" (2013)	"One Way or Another (Teenage Kicks)" (2013)	"Best Song Ever" (2013)

Music video
- "One Way or Another (Teenage Kicks)" on YouTube

English-Irish boy band One Direction covered "One Way or Another" as a charity single for Comic Relief 2013, titled "One Way or Another (Teenage Kicks)", as it also interpolates lyrics from the Undertones' "Teenage Kicks" ("I wanna hold you, wanna hold you tight / Get teenage kicks right through the night"). The single was released on February 17, 2013, and was produced by Julian Bunetta and John Ryan.

"One Way or Another (Teenage Kicks)" debuted at number one on the UK Singles Chart, making it One Direction's third UK number one. It was nominated for Best British Single at the 2014 Brit Awards.

=== Background and response ===
Ahead of its release, an early version of the song leaked online. A spokesperson for Syco Music told the Daily Mirror, "It is very disappointing that the song has been leaked and we are currently investigating the matter."

The single received mixed reviews from music critics. Robert Copsey of Digital Spy said "the cheeky lyrics, bouncy pop-rock melody and singalong chorus feel like an obvious but reassuringly safe option for this year's official Comic Relief single", concluding that it was "predictable but [...] undeniably fun". About.com critic Bill Lamb called the single a "strong performance", assessing, "The layering of the 'Na Na Na Na' bridge from 'One Way Or Another' with the chorus, "I wanna hold you wanna hold you tight, get teenage kicks right through the night" is truly inspiring." However, Lamb also noted that "lyrically, 'One Way Or Another' is nearly a song about the finer points of stalking, and that can be just a bit creepy coming from young males."

Jessica Sager of PopCrush summarised it as "catchy, fun and ... sounds exactly what you'd expect when One Direction cover Blondie." Sager additionally praised Louis Tomlinson's vocals as sounding "phenomenal" in his solo. Writing for MTV, Jenna Rubenstein assessed: "1D's version sticks mainly to the original's vibe, mixing in sugary-sweet pop production with Blondie's punk rock sensibilities."

Writing for The Observer, Kitty Empire was scathing, describing the medley as "execrable". When the single reached number 1 in the Irish Singles Chart, RTÉ described the news as "shocking", noting the single as "just a bit ho hum". The Belfast Telegraph was equally critical, blasting the cover as a "travesty" that had been "re-worked into a sanitised Comic Relief single", which were "scrappy shadows of the originals".

PopMatters gave it the No.1 spot on its "Best Mainstream Pop Singles of 2013" list, calling it "the most inspired, fun track of the year".

The song was later included in the Japanese edition of the band's third studio album Midnight Memories as the 19th track.

=== Commercial performance ===
"One Way or Another (Teenage Kicks)" debuted at number one on the UK Singles Chart dated February 24, 2013, shifting 113,000 copies in its first week—the second highest first-week UK sales for any song in 2013 at the time. It marks their third chart-topper and seventh top ten hit in the United Kingdom. As of March 2013, the song has sold 292,000 copies in the UK.

=== Music video ===
The music video for "One Way or Another (Teenage Kicks)" was shot in Ghana, Tokyo, New York City, and London, including at 10 Downing Street, featuring a cameo from the then-British prime minister David Cameron. The clip was released on February 20, 2013.

=== Live performances ===
One Direction debuted the song live during the 2013 Brit Awards on February 20, 2013. The group also performed the song live during the Comic Relief telethon on March 15, 2013.

=== Track listing ===
- Digital download
1. "One Way or Another (Teenage Kicks)" – 2:37
2. "One Way or Another (Teenage Kicks)" (Sharoque Remix) – 3:07
3. "One Way or Another (Teenage Kicks)" (Instrumental) – 2:37
- Digital download (Live version)
1. "One Way or Another (Teenage Kicks)" (Live from the BRITs) – 3:20

=== Charts ===
==== Weekly charts ====
Weekly chart performance for "One Way or Another"
Chart (2013)	Peak position
Australia (ARIA)	3
Austria (Ö3 Austria Top 40)	12
Belgium (Ultratop 50 Flanders)	5
Belgium (Ultratop 50 Wallonia)	12
Canada Hot 100 (Billboard)	9
Czech Republic Airplay (ČNS IFPI)	2
Denmark (Tracklisten)	1
Euro Digital Song Sales (Billboard)	1
France (SNEP)	17
Germany (GfK)	22
Greece Digital Songs (Billboard)	2
Hungary (Editors' Choice Top 40)	38
Hungary (Single Top 40)	6
Ireland (IRMA)	1
Israel International Airplay (Media Forest)	8
Italy (FIMI)	9
Japan (Oricon)	15
Lebanon (The Official Lebanese Top 20)	10
Mexico (Billboard Mexican Airplay)	50
Netherlands (Dutch Top 40)	8
Netherlands (Single Top 100)	1
New Zealand (Recorded Music NZ)	3
Norway (VG-lista)	12
Poland Airplay (ZPAV)	1
Poland Dance (ZPAV)	34
Poland (Video Chart)	1
Portugal Digital Song Sales (Billboard)	2
Romania (Airplay 100)	80
Russia Airplay (Tophit)	79
Scottish Singles Sales (Official Charts)	1
Slovakia Airplay (ČNS IFPI)	14
Spain (Promusicae)	4
Sweden (Sverigetopplistan)	28
Switzerland (Schweizer Hitparade)	7
UK Singles (Official Charts)	1
UK Airplay (Music Week)	11
Ukraine Airplay (Tophit)	117
US Billboard Hot 100	13

==== Year-end charts ====
Year-end chart performance for "One Way or Another"
Chart (2013)	Position
Australia (ARIA)	54
Belgium (Ultratop 50 Flanders)	26
Belgium (Ultratop 50 Wallonia)	66
Denmark (Tracklisten)	43
France (SNEP)	149
Ireland (IRMA)	19
Italy (FIMI)	98
Netherlands (Dutch Top 40)	42
Netherlands (Single Top 100)	61
UK Singles (Official Charts Company)	24

=== Certifications ===
Region	Certification	Certified units/sales
Australia (ARIA)	2× Platinum	140,000^{^}
Belgium (BRMA)	Gold	15,000^{*}
Canada (Music Canada)	Platinum	80,000^{*}
Denmark (IFPI Danmark)	Gold	15,000^{^}
Italy (FIMI)	Gold	15,000^{*}
Mexico (AMPROFON)	Platinum+Gold	90,000^{*}
New Zealand (RMNZ)	Platinum	15,000^{*}
Norway (IFPI Norway)	Platinum	10,000^{*}
Sweden (GLF)	Gold	20,000^{‡}
United Kingdom (BPI)	Platinum	600,000^{‡}
United States (RIAA)	Gold	500,000^{‡}
Streaming
Denmark (IFPI Danmark)	Gold	900,000^{†}
^{*} Sales figures based on certification alone.^{^} Shipments figures based on certification alone.^{‡} Sales+streaming figures based on certification alone.^{†} Streaming-only figures based on certification alone.

=== Release history ===
Region	Date	Format	Label
United States	February 17, 2013	Digital download	Sony Music Entertainment
United Kingdom	February 17, 2013	Digital download	Sony Music Entertainment
United Kingdom	February 18, 2013	CD single	Sony Music Entertainment
United Kingdom	February 20, 2013	Digital download (Live Version)	Sony Music Entertainment
Japan	April 3, 2013	Maxi single	Sony Music Entertainment
