= One Direction: This Is Us =

2013 film directed by Morgan Spurlock

- Theatrical release poster
- Directed by: Morgan Spurlock
- Produced by: Morgan Spurlock; Adam Milano; Ben Winston; Simon Cowell
- Starring: Niall Horan; Zayn Malik; Liam Payne; Harry Styles; Louis Tomlinson
- Cinematography: Neil Harvey
- Edited by: Guy Harding; Wyatt Smith; Pierre Takal
- Music by: Simon Franglen
- Production companies: TriStar Pictures; Syco Entertainment; Modest Management; Warrior Poets; Fulwell 73
- Distributed by: Sony Pictures Releasing
- Release dates: 20 August 2013 (Leicester Square); 29 August 2013 (United Kingdom); 30 August 2013 (United States)
- Running time: 92 minutes
- Countries: United Kingdom; United States
- Language: English
- Budget: $10 million
- Box office: $68.7 million

One Direction: This Is Us is a 2013 documentary concert film about English-Irish boy band One Direction. It opened in the United Kingdom on 29 August 2013. It also opened a day later in the United States. The film follows the group on their Take Me Home Tour. The film received mixed reviews from critics, but was a commercial success and grossed $68 million worldwide.

== Plot ==
This Is Us follows the lives of the five members of the boy band, One Direction, who rose to fame on the X Factor in 2010, containing the members of Niall Horan, Zayn Malik, Louis Tomlinson, Liam Payne & Harry Styles. This Is Us contains live concert footage from One Direction's Take Me Home Tour at London's O2 Arena, and footage from their lives pre- and post-X Factor appearance, and gives insight into the preparation for their concerts and ultimately what it is like to be One Direction.

The film features appearances from acclaimed director Martin Scorsese and his daughter Francesca, comedian Chris Rock, and footballer Cristiano Ronaldo.

== Production ==
This Is Us was first announced by the band while on The Today Show in New York's Rockefeller Plaza on 12 November 2012, followed by confirmation it would be directed by Morgan Spurlock. Spurlock, who unsuccessfully negotiated to direct similar films, Justin Bieber: Never Say Never and Katy Perry: Part of Me, said that he took on the film because of the band's fast-track rise to stardom. The film started filming in Tokyo on 17 January 2013 and was being shot in 3D with 4K resolution RED Epic digital cameras, which Spurlock said gave a cinematic appeal. The film was later given the name One Direction: This Is Us on 19 March 2013, previously being referred to as 1D3D. A majority of the movie was shot in London at the O2 arena in early April. It has been further said that the film is not scripted, with the footage genuine and of them acting "naturally". Harry Styles admitted that the cameras following them around was scary but said that this film gives them the opportunity to show more personality, how they interact, and how they relax when not on stage. Niall Horan remarked that the film crew had access to all areas, even filming them in the toilet.

Scenes shown in trailers include footage of fans telling stories related to the band following a request posted on YouTube, as well as comment from Simon Cowell, who was their mentor on The X Factor and is also a producer of the film.

== Release ==
The world premiere of the film was held in Leicester Square, in London on 20 August 2013. Germany gave this film an early screening on 27 August 2013. Some countries have released this film on 28 August 2013, a day before the United Kingdom released it.

The film was released in the United Kingdom on 29 August 2013, and was rolled out internationally on 30 August 2013 with a majority of markets being reached by the end of September 2013.

=== Marketing ===
As part of the marketing campaign, the band allowed fans to upload pictures of themselves that would appear on a version of the theatrical poster. The theatrical poster itself has pictures of fans forming part of the background, with another version created and displayed on the band's website where the photos were used to recreate the poster itself.

An initial teaser trailer was released on 8 February 2013, followed by a second trailer on 25 June 2013. This second trailer also teased a snippet of "Best Song Ever", the lead single from their third studio album, Midnight Memories, which released upcoming on 25 November 2013.

=== Box office ===
This Is Us grossed $28.9 million in North America, and $38.5 million in other countries, for a worldwide total of $68.5 million. It is currently the fourth highest-grossing concert film. It made a net profit of $18 million, when factoring together all expenses and revenues for the film.

The film scored $2.7 million on its Thursday debut, and topped the box office on its opening weekend, earning $17,000,000, far better than other concert films like Katy Perry: Part of Me, Glee: The 3D Concert Movie, and Jonas Brothers: The 3D Concert Experience, but not enough to surpass Justin Bieber: Never Say Never, Hannah Montana & Miley Cyrus: Best of Both Worlds and Michael Jackson's This Is It. This Is Us is the third concert film to top the box office, after the Hannah Montana and Michael Jackson films.

According to Forbes, the film would top the box office on its opening weekend with an estimated $18 million. The Hollywood Reporter said the film would earn about $45 million in its four-day debut.

The film has been a box office success worldwide, grossing over six times its budget.

=== Critical response ===
On Rotten Tomatoes the film has an approval rating of 64% based on 91 reviews, with an average rating of 5.8/10. The website's critical consensus reads, "It's mostly for the converted, but One Direction: This Is Us will be fun for fans – and it offers just enough slickly edited concert footage to entertain the casual viewer." On Metacritic, the film has a weighted average score of 49 out of 100, based on 27 critics, indicating "mixed or average reviews". Audiences polled by CinemaScore gave the film an average grade of "A" on an A+ to F scale. The audience was 87% female, and 65% under the age of 17.

The Seattle Times gave it an average rating of 2 stars (out of 4), Roger Moore felt "It's not that different from the Justin Bieber doc, or the Jonas Brothers and Miley Cyrus concert films – sanitized, packaged – presenting these five British or Irish boys, ages 19-22, as paragons of pop virtue while others vouch for what "rebels" they are and that they have 'edge.'" finally adding "It's a chipper, cheerful portrait with nary a discouraging word in it. The tunes are catchy, and the boys have charm, a little wit about them and some stage presence even if their shows have all the spontaneity of a McDonald's menu. Not that their fans want to hear that, or hear that they have a limited shelf life. Oh no. They never let us forget that it's a teenage girls' world. We're all just wearing earplugs in it." New York Daily News gave a more positive rating of 3 out of 5 stars. Jim Farber felt "To their credit, the guys decided to devote more than half the film to backstage antics and talk, as opposed to Justin Bieber, whose live 3—D film nervously stuck to the stage. While One Direction come off as fun and likeable, no one will mistake their quips for the inspired absurdism of the Beatles in A Hard Day's Night." Nor will they take Spurlock's routine camera work for the pop-art panache of Richard Lester. The Washington Post; film critic Stephanie Merry felt "To add a bit of emotion, the film hears from the boys' mothers and follows the five as they take a break from touring to return home. But for the most part, the movie embraces harmless fun, which can be enjoyable for the audience members, whether they're 1D fans or not" finally adding "Some of the guys have made gossip rag headlines for their wild ways, including drunken behavior, but there's no hint of that here... Maybe showing those details carries the risk of alienating One Direction's fans. When the guys sing "I'm in love with you" the "you" is meant to be each starry-eyed listener. But the absence of certain truths makes the movie feel more like marketing material for superheroes than a comprehensive documentary about human dimension. If One Direction fans end up having inordinately high standards when it comes to love, Spurlock is at least partly to blame."

The A.V. Club gave the film a grade of B−, A.A. Dowd felt "For the most part, though, This Is Us plays like a victory lap for its adolescent stars, five best friends surprisingly aware that their fame and fortune won't last forever. More delusional is the agreed-upon conclusion that the band wouldn't succeed if it was missing even a single one of its largely interchangeable members. Who do these kids think they are, The Beatles? Actually, Spurlock makes that connection more than once—first by noting that One Direction has conquered the world even faster than its Liverpool predecessors, second by casting the new British invaders in a loose A Hard Day's Night homage." Chicago Sun-Times's Bill Zwecker felt "My major issue with "One Direction: This Is Us" is the use of distracting 3-D effects that feel forced. And the insertion of animation during some of the concert footage come off as jarring and kind of amateurish. That said, the film is a successful witness to the great charm possessed by all five members of One Direction. I loved it when they were seen as the kids they still are, horsing around with their stage crew and bodyguards – joyfully letting off steam as they careen backstage on a forklift they've "hijacked"."

A more negative review came from The Telegraph, Robbie Collin felt "This Is Us has been made with these fans in mind, and there's nothing like a guaranteed profit to stifle creativity. This isn't a problem peculiar to manufactured pop, either: there is a Morrissey concert film coming out later this week that makes One Direction: This Is Us look like Martin Scorsese's The Last Waltz.". The New York Times also gave it a negative review, Miriam Bale felt "With a group so evidently versed in the visuals of rock history, it's a shame that a filmmaker wasn't hired who would pay homage to classic pop films instead of offering a satisfactory paid promotional. In the end credits – Richard Lester-style scenes of the boys in costumes doing pranks – we see how this film might have been more successful: as an obvious fiction starring these appealing personalities rather than a tame and somewhat fake documentary."

=== Extended cut ===
On 9 September 2013, it was announced that Sony would release an "extended fan cut" of This Is Us on 13 September. This version included an additional 20 minutes of footage with four new songs, including scenes that followed the boys on tour, and took fans back with them to their respective hometowns.

=== Blu-ray and DVD ===
The movie was released on DVD and Blu-ray on 17 December 2013 in North America. It was released two days later in the UK. The format includes never-before-seen footage from the 'Ultimate Fan Edition' and several exclusive interviews. The DVD peaked at number one on the Official Video Chart in the UK, selling 270,000 copies within its first three days of release. As a result, it beat the record set by Michael Jackson's This Is It in 2010 by 10,000 copies.

=== Charts ===
Chart (2013/2014)	Peak position
Australian Music DVD (ARIA)	2
Hungarian Albums (MAHASZ)	10
UK Music Videos (Official Charts)	1
Irish Albums (IRMA)	1

== Certifications ==
Region	Certification	Certified units/sales
Ireland (IRMA)	7× Platinum	105,000^{^}
United Kingdom (BPI)	10× Platinum	500,000^{*}
^{*} Sales figures based on certification alone.^{^} Shipments figures based on certification alone.

== International releases ==
Europe

- Austria: 11 October 2013
- Belgium: 28 August 2013
- Bosnia and Herzegovina: 29 August 2013
- Bulgaria: 30 August 2013
- Croatia: 29 August 2013
- Cyprus: 30 August 2013
- Czech Republic: 5 September 2013
- Denmark: 28 August 2013
- Estonia: 30 August 2013
- Finland: 30 August 2013
- France: 28 August 2013
- Germany: 27 August 2013 (early screening)
  - Germany: 12 September 2013 (actual release date)
- Greece: 29 August 2013
- Hungary: 5 September 2013
- Iceland: 6 September 2013
- Ireland: 29 August 2013
- Italy: 5 September 2013
- Kazakhstan: 30 August 2013
- Latvia: 29 August 2013
- Lithuania: 29 August 2013
- Macedonia: 25 September 2013
- Netherlands: 29 August 2013
- Norway: 6 September 2013
- Poland: 30 August 2013
- Portugal: 29 August 2013
- Romania: 30 August 2013
- Russia: 30 August 2013
- Serbia: 29 August 2013
- Slovakia: 5 September 2013
- Slovenia: 28 August 2013
- Spain: 30 August 2013
- Sweden: 28 August 2013
- Switzerland: 30 August 2013
- Turkey: 30 August 2013
- United Kingdom: 29 August 2013

North America

- Canada: 30 August 2013
- United States: 30 August 2013

Latin America

- Argentina: 28 August 2013 (premiere exclusive) 29 August 2013
- Bolivia: 10 September 2013
- Brazil: 6 September 2013
- Chile: 29 August 2013
- Colombia: 30 August 2013
- Dominican Republic: 29 August 2013
- Ecuador: 30 August 2013
- Jamaica: 30 August 2013
- Mexico: 30 August 2013
- Peru: 29 August 2013
- Puerto Rico: 5 September 2013
- Uruguay: 30 August 2013
- Venezuela: 30 September 2013

Middle East/Africa And Asia

- Bahrain: 29 August 2013
- Egypt: 11 September 2013
- Ethiopia: 30 August 2013
- Hong Kong: 29 August 2013
- India: 6 September 2013
- Indonesia: 31 August 2013
- Iraq: 29 August 2013
- Israel: 29 August 2013
- Jordan: 29 August 2013
- Kuwait: 29 August 2013
- Lebanon: 29 August 2013
- Malaysia: 29 August 2013
- Morocco: 4 September 2013
- Nepal: 13 September 2013
- Oman: 29 August 2013
- Pakistan: 27 September 2013
- Philippines: 30 August 2013
- Qatar: 29 August 2013
- Singapore: 29 August 2013
- South Africa: 11 October 2013
- Tunisia: 21 September 2013
- United Arab Emirates: 29 August 2013

== Sequel ==
The sequel to This Is Us entitled One Direction: Where We Are – The Concert Film, was announced on 21 July 2014. It premiered in cinemas worldwide with a limited engagement for 11–12 October 2014. The sequel was filmed at Stadio San Siro in Milan, Italy on 28–29 June 2014, during the band's Where We Are Tour. The film was released on home media in December 2014.
