= Vasia Tzanakari =

Greek writer

Vasia Tzanakari (born 1980) is a Greek writer. Born in Serres, she studied English at the Aristotelian University of Thessaloniki and completed postgraduate studies in Athens. She has published two books: Eleven little murders: Stories inspired by Nick Cave songs (2008) and a novel Johnny & Lulu (2011). She has also edited a music magazine, worked as a journalist, and translated literary works from English to Greek, for example, works by Ian Rankin and Gillian Flynn.

Tzanakari lives in Athens. Her father, Vasilis Tzanakaris (born in Pentapoli, Serres) is also a writer.
