= Midnight Memories (song) =

Single by One Direction

from the album Midnight Memories
- Released: 9 March 2014
- Recorded: 2013
- Genre: Pop rock
- Length: 2:56
- Label: Syco; Columbia
- Songwriters: Julian Bunetta; Jamie Scott; John Ryan; Louis Tomlinson; Liam Payne
- Producers: Jamie Scott; Julian Bunetta; John Ryan

One Direction singles chronology
| "Story of My Life" (2013) | "Midnight Memories" (2014) | "You & I" (2014) |

Music video
- "Midnight Memories" on YouTube

"Midnight Memories" is a song by the English-Irish boy band One Direction from their third studio album of the same name. It was co-written by Julian Bunetta, Jamie Scott, John Ryan and band members Liam Payne and Louis Tomlinson.

The song was released on 20 November 2013, five days prior to the release of the album, and debuted at number three on the Irish Singles Chart the following day. It has since peaked in the top 10 of nine other countries around the world, including Australia, New Zealand, Denmark, the Netherlands and Spain.

On 25 January 2014, it was announced that "Midnight Memories" would be the third single from the album. It received an official release on 9 March 2014.

== Background and release ==
"Midnight Memories" was written by John Ryan, Jamie Scott, Liam Payne, Louis Tomlinson and Julian Bunetta and produced by Bunetta. It is the second single to be written by members of the band, following the previous single of the same album, "Story of My Life". Talking to MTV News about the track, Bunetta said, "It's the title of the album and it just happens to fall in line with Up All Night, Take Me Home, it's all references to in the evening. And midnight memories are where most of the memories of this record were made. [It] was between midnight and 5 in the morning. We have so many memories of just being in the studio or being after a show or being in the back of the bus or going to one of the guys' places and hanging and writing. Or, just when you're young and that's when you kind of have all your experiences."

On 24 January 2014, Payne revealed through a video on the band's YouTube channel that "Midnight Memories" would serve as the third single of the album outside the US.

== Critical reception ==
On 25 November, in a track-by-track review on Billboard writer Chris Payne and by Michael Craigg on the Daily Mirror opined that "it opens with groovy guitar licks, leads into a peppy pre-chorus, and rocks out in the chorus behind a riff reminiscent of Def Leppard's "Pour Some Sugar on Me."

== Chart performance ==
The song was released on 20 November 2013, five days prior to the release of the album, and debuted at number three on the Irish Singles Chart the following day. It has since peaked in the top 10 of nine other countries around the world, including Australia, New Zealand, Denmark, the Netherlands and Spain. It was less successful in the UK upon its release, only just managing to peak inside the top 40 at number 39.

== Music video ==
The official music video was filmed in London in December 2013. On 25 January 2014, it was announced that the video would premiere on Vevo at midnight on 31 January. To date, the video has over 200 million views. The video begins with One Direction at a house party, they are all bored until the DJ starts playing "Midnight Memories". They then leave the house and over run a take-away. They flirt with and ride around the streets of London with five elderly women on motorized scooters, steal a police boat and ride down the River Thames and the video ends with the group standing on the edge of Tower Bridge.

== Track listing ==
Digital download – EP

1. "Midnight Memories" – 2:55
2. "Story of My Life" (Live X Factor performance) – 4:18
3. "Rock Me" (Live version from the Motion Picture One Direction: This Is Us) – 4:15
4. "C'mon, C'mon" (Live version from the Motion Picture One Direction: This Is Us) – 3:27

== Live performances ==
One Direction performed the song during the Midnight Memories release party in Los Angeles on 22 November 2013. The song was also performed during their concert for Good Morning America on 26 November. They performed the song live on the final of The X Factor on 15 December, La Voz on 18 December and the final of The X Factor USA on 19 December. Also they performance two major concert tours: Where We Are Tour (2014) and On the Road Again Tour (2015).

== Controversy ==
On 19 December 2013, it was announced that Def Leppard had asked their lawyers to look into allegations that "Midnight Memories" and "Pour Some Sugar on Me" bear striking similarities. However, Def Leppard guitarists Phil Collen and Vivian Campbell confirmed to Billboard that they were not, in fact, pursuing legal action. Collen called the songs "very similar in structure", but nothing more. Campbell said: "The chords are one–four–five. Those are the blues. You don’t get more basic than that. I think what’s more reminiscent of the Leppard thing is the production, the sound, the vocals, the reverb and the way it's assembled.

== Charts ==
Chart performance for "Midnight Memories"
| Chart (2013–15) | Peak position |
|---|---|
| Australia (ARIA) | 45 |
| Austria (Ö3 Austria Top 40) | 22 |
| Belgium (Ultratop 50 Flanders) | 4 |
| Belgium (Ultratop 50 Wallonia) | 8 |
| Brazil (Billboard Brasil Hot 100) | 95 |
| Canada Hot 100 (Billboard) | 35 |
| Denmark (Tracklisten) | 2 |
| Euro Digital Song Sales (Billboard) | 5 |
| France (SNEP) | 14 |
| Germany (GfK) | 91 |
| Greece Digital Songs (Billboard) | 4 |
| Hungary (Single Top 40) | 5 |
| Ireland (IRMA) | 3 |
| Italy (FIMI) | 7 |
| Lebanon (The Official Lebanese Top 20) | 8 |
| Luxembourg Digital Song Sales (Billboard) | 5 |
| Mexico (Monitor Latino) | 20 |
| Netherlands (Single Top 100) | 5 |
| New Zealand (Recorded Music NZ) | 3 |
| Poland Airplay (ZPAV) | 16 |
| Portugal Digital Song Sales (Billboard) | 5 |
| South Korea (Gaon) | 141 |
| Spain (Promusicae) | 4 |
| Switzerland (Schweizer Hitparade) | 54 |
| UK Singles (Official Charts) | 39 |
| US Billboard Hot 100 | 12 |

== Certifications ==
| Region | Certification | Certified units/sales |
|---|---|---|
| Australia (ARIA) | Gold | 35,000^{‡} |
| Mexico (AMPROFON) | Gold | 30,000^{‡} |
| New Zealand (RMNZ) | Platinum | 30,000^{‡} |
| United Kingdom (BPI) | Gold | 400,000^{‡} |
^{‡} Sales+streaming figures based on certification alone.
