= Midnight Memories =

- Standard edition cover. The Ultimate Edition's cover has the image in black and white and the album text in red.

Studio album by One Direction
- Released: 25 November 2013
- Recorded: December 2012 – September 2013
- Genres: Pop rock; dance-pop; pop
- Length: 47:41
- Labels: Columbia; Syco
- Producers: Julian Bunetta; Carl Falk; Tom Fletcher; Teddy Geiger; Danny Jones; Jacknife Lee; Dougie Poynter; Robert John "Mutt" Lange; Matt Rad; John Ryan; Jamie Scott; Toby Smith; Ryan Tedder

One Direction chronology
Take Me Home (2012)	Midnight Memories (2013)	Four (2014)

Singles from Midnight Memories
- 1. "Best Song Ever" Released: 22 July 2013; 2. "Story of My Life" Released: 28 October 2013; 3. "Midnight Memories" Released: 9 March 2014; 4. "You & I" Released: 18 April 2014

Midnight Memories is the third studio album by English-Irish boy band One Direction, released on 25 November 2013 by Columbia Records, Syco Music and Sony Music. It was described as having a "slightly rockier tone" than their previous efforts. The album became the fastest-selling album in Amazon UK history, breaking the record set by their previous release, Take Me Home (2012). It debuted at number one on the US Billboard 200, making One Direction the first group in history to debut at number one in the US with their first three albums. Despite being released five weeks before the year's end, Midnight Memories nevertheless became the best-selling album of 2013 as listed by the IFPI, with sales of four million copies. The album was supported by four singles: "Best Song Ever", "Story of My Life", the album's title track "Midnight Memories", and "You & I".

Upon the album's release, Midnight Memories received mixed reviews from music critics. Many critics praised the lyrical depth and musical composition on the album, as well as the group's level of involvement in the production process. However, others argued that the material was less memorable than their previous work and felt the themes were not as mature as expected. To promote the album, One Direction embarked on their Where We Are Tour in 2014, with this being their third world tour and their first stadium concert tour.

== Background and development ==
One Direction began working on their third studio album whilst embarking on their second world tour, the Take Me Home Tour. The album was announced simultaneously with the news of the band's third world tour, the Where We Are Tour, which subsequently led fans to wrongly assume that the album would be named "Where We Are". Member Louis Tomlinson proclaimed that the album would have a "rockier" sound to it than the band's previous releases. The official title of the album was announced on 6 September 2013, starting with Zayn Malik tweeting a teaser video of Harry Styles spelling out the word "Mid" out of a pile of alphabet cards on the floor, followed by a full video posted on the band's Instagram account later on, revealing the title, Midnight Memories.

The album artwork was released early exclusively by The Sun via a tweet which was then confirmed to be the official artwork through the band's official Twitter account, though the early access was only available for those who held a membership of the newspaper's online version. On 11 October, the band presented the album's final track list through the "#MidnightMemoriesTrackQuiz" hashtag on Twitter by giving out a mixture of hints and blank spaces to be filled alongside the final result. The full track list for the deluxe edition was later shown on iTunes. The album later leaked one week prior to its release.

== Singles ==
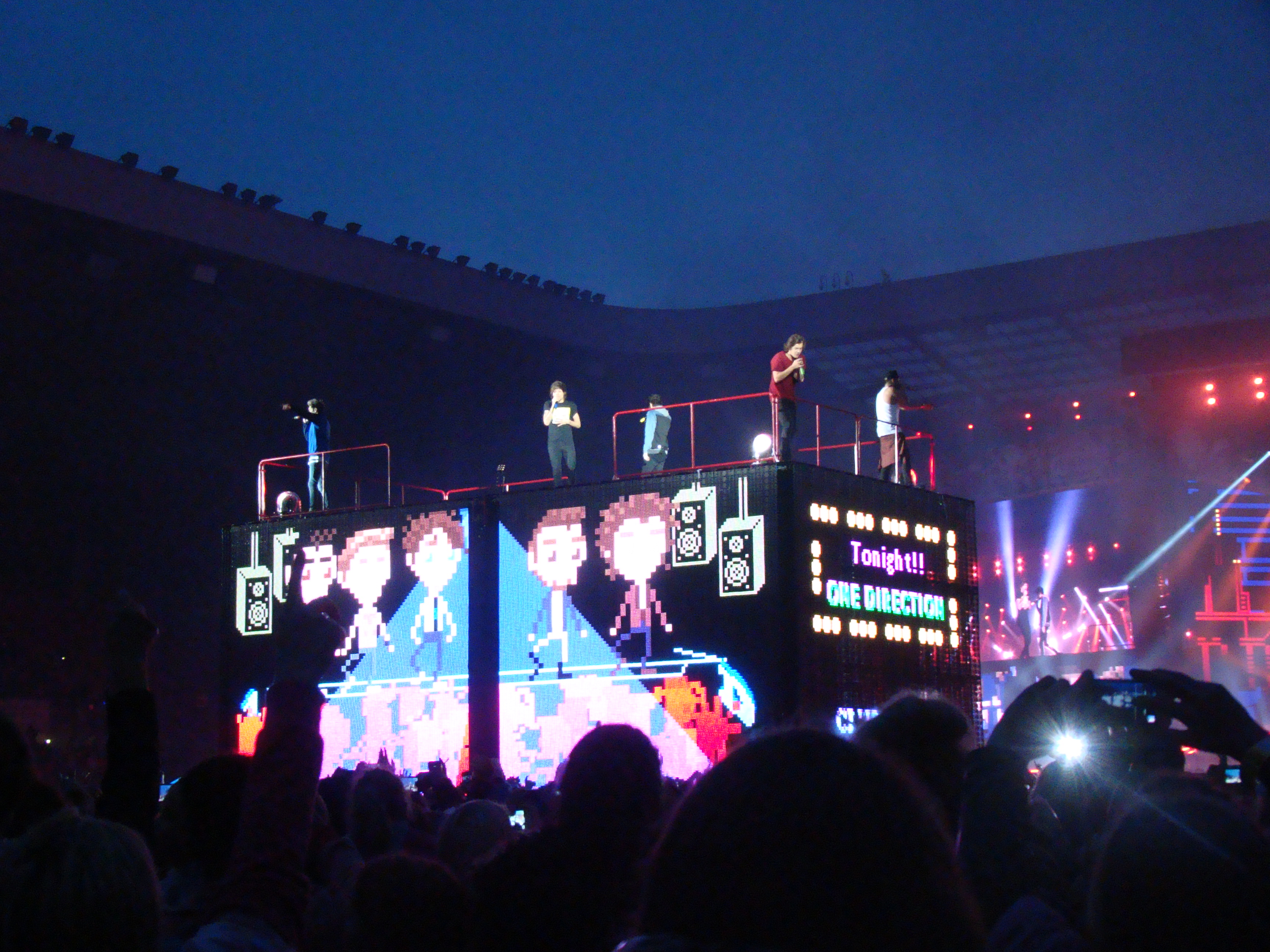
One Direction during Where We Are Tour at Stadium of Light.

"Best Song Ever" was released on 22 July 2013 as the official lead single from the album. The track peaked at number two on the UK Singles Chart. Its music video beat the Vevo record for most viewers within 24 hours on YouTube, clocking in at 12.3 million views, beating the previous record set by Miley Cyrus for "We Can't Stop", which held 10.7 million views in 24 hours.

"Story of My Life" was released on 28 October 2013 as the second single from the album. The track premiered on 25 October 2013, playing at 16:00 British Summer Time on radio stations across the world and debuted at number four on the UK Singles Chart, despite holding the number one position on the midweek chart and continuing to lead until Saturday of that week. The song eventually peaked at number 2. The music video was released on 3 November 2013.

"Midnight Memories" was announced as the third single from the album on 24 January 2014.

"You & I" was serviced to US radio on 15 April 2014 as the album's fourth and final single.

=== Promotional singles ===
- "Diana" was the first promotional single. It charted in the Irish top 10 on 21 November 2013, and at number two on the New Zealand Singles Chart on 22 November 2013.
- "Strong" debuted at number one on the New Zealand Singles Chart on 29 November 2013, four days after the album's release.

=== Other songs ===
- "One Way or Another" was released on 17 February 2013 as the official 2013 Comic Relief single, peaking at number one on the UK Singles Chart and achieving success around the world.

All songs except "Something Great" have charted on the UK Singles Chart.

== Critical reception ==
Professional ratings
Aggregate scores
Source	Rating
Metacritic	59/100
Review scores
Source	Rating
AllMusic	4/5 stars
The A.V. Club	B−
Entertainment Weekly	B−
Los Angeles Times	2.5/4 stars
The Guardian	3/5 stars
Rolling Stone	2.5/5 stars
Slant Magazine	3/5 stars
Spin	6/10
USA Today	3/4 stars

Upon its release, Midnight Memories received mixed reviews from music critics and publications. At Metacritic, which assigns a normalized rating out of 100 to reviews from mainstream publications, the album received an average score of 59, based on 15 reviews, indicating "mixed or average reviews".

Brian Mansfield from USA Today awarded it three stars out of four, saying "Midnight uses classic rock as a color the way last year's Take Me Home used electronic dance music." Kitty Empire of The Guardian commented that "after two albums of flirting, hand-holding and coltish fumbling at parties, One Direction might just have finally gone all the way on their third album" and that "this album does the job, in more ways than one" while commenting specifically of the new maturity of the group and the "rockier" sound. Tim Sendra from AllMusic gave the album 4 stars out of 5, saying that "anyone expecting there to be any kind of drop in quality, or early warnings that the group had begun their inevitable decline, will be happily surprised that not only does the album satisfy the established quota of thrilling modern pop tracks and uplifting ballads, but also introduces some interesting new directions". He praised the bold decision to evolve the band's sound, and its results, concluding that the record "ends up as another satisfying album that does everything a 1D album should do and then some."

Chris Payne of Billboard wrote that the album "follows up on what worked best on last year's Take Me Home and tosses in some proficient new ideas to keep listeners eager for the band's continued evolution" while noting the new prominence of the guitar in the songs. Writing with USA Today, Brian Mansfield complimented the songwriting of Tomlinson and Payne while noting the "elements of power pop in the shouted choruses of the riffy title track and the trebly guitar chords" while adding "the best songs here ... suggest the group's finest memories may still lie ahead". Sam Lansky of Idolator complimented the album, calling it "one of the sturdier pop releases in recent memory" and commenting that One Direction "have proven themselves to be a surprisingly reliable pop act, and here, as ever, the choruses soar marvelously, the harmonies are pleasing, the production is taut and the songcraft is beyond reproach".

Annie Zaleski of The A.V. Club said the album "isn’t a genre game-changer" but that "there’s enough personality, charm, and dramatic solos to satisfy fans, and enough incremental moves toward artistic credibility to at least give the band a chance at an enduring career". Eric Henderson of Slant Magazine noted that the group "tossed aside the wilted tissues of their adolescent pop trifles in favor of protein-blasted rock anthems and mountain-man acoustic ballads" while also commenting on the '80s rock sound. Writing with Spin, Alfred Soto deemed Midnight Memories "the best boy-band album since No Strings Attached while complimenting the "inspired juxtapositions like early-’60s twang guitar and parade-ground beats".

However, some critics were less enthusiastic. Many argued the absence of their previous work, deeming it "not special" and "forgettable" and some felt it was too mature for their core audience and didn't come off as mature as expected through their themes. Rob Tannebaum of Rolling Stone gave a mixed review, commenting that "they joyfully plunder rock riffs and hip-hop beats, but a logjam of lousy ballads suggests Bryan Adams embodies their ideal of maturity". Jim Farber from Daily News gave it three stars out of five, arguing that most of the songs "sounds much like any goo from the guys". Speaking of the musical style of the album, he stated that although "there probably are just enough newbies to extend the band's brand for this small window before the next thing comes along," he believed the group presented an image too mature for their core audience, saying "One Direction must reconcile this range with their own growth spurts," and describing the grown-up appearance of the band members since their debut single as "a big change in just three years". Andy Gill of The Independent called the album "a clumsy attempt at rock".

== Commercial performance ==
The album debuted at number one on the Irish Albums Chart and number two on the Dutch Albums Chart. On 29 November 2013, it was announced that it had become the fastest-selling album of 2013 in the UK, with 187,660 copies sold in four days. It was revealed on 1 December 2013, that the album had sold in excess of 237,000 copies in its first week in the UK, beating Gary Barlow's Since I Saw You Last, and becoming the fastest selling album in the UK since Michael Bublé's Christmas in December 2011, as well as outperforming One Direction's two previous albums Up All Night (2011) and Take Me Home (2012). It became the best-selling album of 2013 in the UK with 685,000 copies sold for the year.

In the United States, Midnight Memories debuted at number one on the Billboard 200 with 546,000 copies sold in its first week. This made One Direction the first group in Billboard 200 history to debut at No. 1 with its first three albums, and the first to reach No. 1 with its first three albums since 1967. The album sold 1,096,000 copies in five weeks in the United States, making it the twelfth best-selling album of 2013 in the United States. As of August 2015, it has sold over 1.51 million copies in the U.S.

Midnight Memories also debuted at numbers one and two on the ARIA Albums Chart and the New Zealand Albums Chart, and was certified Platinum and Gold, respectively, in its first week. The album went on to sell over 60,000 copies in Mexico after only three days, being certified Platinum.

Despite being released towards the year's end, Midnight Memories nevertheless became the best-selling album of 2013 worldwide according to the IFPI, with sales of over four million copies in only 5 weeks.

== Track listing ==
Standard edition
No.	Title	Writer(s)	Producer(s)	Length
1.	"Best Song Ever"	Wayne Hector; John Ryan; Ed Drewett; Julian Bunetta	Bunetta; Ryan; Matt Rad	3:20
2.	"Story of My Life"	Bunetta; Jamie Scott; Ryan; Louis Tomlinson; Liam Payne; Niall Horan; Harry Styles; Zayn Malik	Bunetta; Ryan	4:05
3.	"Diana"	Bunetta; Scott; Ryan; Tomlinson; Payne	Bunetta; Ryan	3:04
4.	"Midnight Memories"	Bunetta; Scott; Ryan; Tomlinson; Payne	Lange; Bunetta; Ryan	2:56
5.	"You & I"	Bunetta; Scott; Ryan	Bunetta; Ryan	3:57
6.	"Don't Forget Where You Belong"	Tom Fletcher; Danny Jones; Dougie Poynter; Horan	Fletcher; Jones; Poynter	4:01
7.	"Strong"	Bunetta; Scott; Ryan; Tomlinson	Bunetta; Ryan	3:04
8.	"Happily"	Savan Kotecha; Carl Falk; Styles	Falk; Kristian Lundin^{[a]}	2:55
9.	"Right Now"	Ryan Tedder; Tomlinson; Payne; Styles	Tedder; Jake Gosling^{[b]}	3:20
10.	"Little Black Dress"	Bunetta; Ryan; Teddy Geiger; Tomlinson; Payne	Bunetta; Ryan; Geiger	2:37
11.	"Through the Dark"	Scott; Toby Smith; Tomlinson; Payne	Scott; Smith; Ryan^{[c]}	3:41
12.	"Something Great"	Jacknife Lee; Gary Lightbody; Styles	Jacknife Lee	3:56
13.	"Little White Lies"	Hector; Ryan; Drewett; Bunetta; Tomlinson; Payne	Bunetta; Ryan	3:17
14.	"Better Than Words"	Bunetta; Scott; Ryan; Tomlinson; Payne	Bunetta; Ryan	3:28
Total length:				47:51

Japanese edition bonus tracks
No.	Title	Writer(s)	Producer(s)	Length
15.	"One Way or Another (Teenage Kicks)"	Deborah Harry; Nigel Harrison; John O'Neill	Bunetta; Ryan^{[d]}	2:39
16.	"Little Things" (live version from the motion picture This Is Us)	Ed Sheeran; Fiona Bevan	Jake Gosling	3:47
17.	"Best Song Ever" (Kat Krazy Remix)	Hector; Ryan; Drewett; Bunetta	Bunetta; Ryan; Rad; Kat Krazy^{[c]}	3:06
Total length:				57:23

The ultimate edition bonus tracks
No.	Title	Writer(s)	Producer(s)	Length
15.	"Why Don't We Go There?"	Steve Robson; Claude Kelly; Hector; Tomlinson	Robson	2:54
16.	"Does He Know?"	Bunetta; Scott; Ryan; Tomlinson; Payne	Bunetta; Ryan; Scott^{[a]}	2:59
17.	"Alive"	Bunetta; Scott; Ryan; Tomlinson	Bunetta; Ryan; Rad	2:41
18.	"Half a Heart"	Robson; Drewett; Lindy Robbins	Robson	3:08
Total length:				59:36

Notes

- ^{^[a]} signifies a vocal producer
- ^{^[b]} signifies an additional vocal producer
- ^{^[c]} signifies an additional producer
- ^{^[d]} signifies a co-producer
- Japanese ultimate edition features 18 tracks from the ultimate edition and Japanese bonus tracks placed as tracks 19-21.

== Personnel ==
Credits adapted from the album's liner notes.

=== One Direction ===
- Liam Payne – vocals
- Harry Styles – vocals
- Louis Tomlinson – vocals
- Zayn Malik – vocals
- Niall Horan – vocals

=== Additional musicians ===
- Julian Bunetta – background vocals (tracks 1–3, 7, 10, 13), instrumentation (1, 5, 7), all instruments (2–4, 13, 14), drums (10)
- John Ryan – background vocals (tracks 1–3, 7, 10, 13, 14), instrumentation (1, 5, 7), all instruments (2–4, 11, 14), acoustic guitars (5), guitars (10)
- Damon Bunetta – background vocals (tracks 1–3, 7, 13), all instruments (4)
- Ian Franzino – background vocals (tracks 1, 2)
- Matt Rad – bass, guitar, keyboards, programming, gang vocals (track 1)
- Stefan Litrownik – drums (track 1)
- Petros Anastos-Prastacos – gang vocals (track 1)
- Ruth-Anne Cunningham – background vocals (track 1)
- Jamie Scott – background vocals (tracks 2, 3, 11), all instruments (2, 4, 11)
- Peter Bunetta – background vocals (track 2), all instruments (4)
- Christine Wu – strings, string arrangement (tracks 2, 5)
- Daniel Weiner – backing vocals (tracks 3, 7, 13)
- Jaco Caraco – guitars (track 7)
- Carl Falk – acoustic guitars, electric guitars, instrumentation, programming (track 8)
- Chris Patrick – bass (track 8)
- Ilya Toshinskiy – banjo, mandolin track (8)
- Savan Kotecha – additional backing vocals (track 8)
- Ryan Tedder – acoustic guitar, electric guitar, bass, piano, drums, drum programming, instrumentation (track 9)
- Teddy Geiger – bass, background vocals (track 10)
- Toby Smith – all instruments (track 11)
- Jacknife Lee – drums, bass, guitars, percussion, keyboards (track 12)
- Chris Thornberry – piano (track 12)
- Davide Rossi – strings (track 12)

=== Technical ===
- Tom Coyne – mastering
- Serban Ghenea – mixing (tracks 1, 8)
- Joe Zook – mixing (tracks 2–4, 9, 11, 13)
- Ash Howes – mixing (tracks 5–7, 14)
- Mark "Spike" Stent – mixing (track 12)
- Julian Bunetta – engineering (tracks 1–5, 7, 10, 13, 14)
- John Ryan – engineering (tracks 1–5, 7, 10, 13, 14)
- Matt Rad – engineering (track 1)
- Petros Anastos-Prastacos – engineering (track 1)
- Alex Oriet – engineering (tracks 2, 11), vocal engineering (1, 3, 8, 12, 14)
- Ben "Bengineer" Chang – engineering (tracks 2, 11), vocal engineering (3, 8, 14)
- Ryan Tedder – engineering (track 9)
- Tim Thomas – engineering (track 9)
- Sam Miller – engineering (track 11)
- Matt Bishop – engineering (track 12)
- Jacknife Lee – engineering (track 12)
- John Hanes – mix engineering (tracks 1, 8)
- Kristian Lundin – vocal recording, vocal editing (track 8)
- Ryan Lipman – mix engineering assistance (tracks 2–4, 9, 11, 13)
- Geoff Swan – mixing assistance (track 12)
- Ian Franzino – engineering assistance (tracks 1–5, 7, 10, 13, 14)

=== Visuals ===
- RJ Shaughnessy – photography
- Calvin Aurand – photography
- Fluidesign – design

== Charts ==
=== Weekly charts ===
Chart (2013–2014)	Peak position
Australian Albums (ARIA)	1
Austrian Albums (Ö3 Austria)	2
Belgian Albums (Ultratop Flanders)	1
Belgian Albums (Ultratop Wallonia)	2
Brazilian Albums (ABPD)	3
Canadian Albums (Billboard)	1
Chinese Albums (Sino Chart)	4
Cypriot Albums (Official Cyprus Charts)	1
Czech Albums (ČNS IFPI)	1
Danish Albums (Hitlisten)	1
Dutch Albums (Album Top 100)	2
Finnish Albums (Suomen virallinen lista)	2
French Albums (SNEP)	2
German Albums (Offizielle Top 100)	5
Greek Albums (IFPI)	1
Hungarian Albums (MAHASZ)	1
Irish Albums (IRMA)	1
Irish Albums (Official Charts)	7
Italian Albums (FIMI)	2
Japanese Albums (Oricon)	3
Mexican Albums (AMPROFON)	1
New Zealand Albums (RMNZ)	2
Norwegian Albums (VG-lista)	1
Polish Albums (ZPAV)	2
Portuguese Albums (AFP)	1
Scottish Albums (Official Charts)	1
South African Albums (RISA)	4
Spanish Albums (Promusicae)	1
Swedish Albums (Sverigetopplistan)	1
Swiss Albums (Schweizer Hitparade)	2
Taiwanese Albums (G-Music)	1
UK Albums (Official Charts)	1
US Billboard 200	1
US Top Album Sales (Billboard)	1
US Top Catalog Albums (Billboard)	6

=== Monthly charts ===
Chart (2013)	Peak position
Argentine Monthly Albums (CAPIF)	1

=== Year-end charts ===
Chart (2013)	Position
Argentine Albums (CAPIF)	4
Australian Albums (ARIA)	6
Belgian Albums (Ultratop Flanders)	29
Belgian Albums (Ultratop Wallonia)	67
Brazilian Albums (ABPD)	10
Danish Albums (Hitlisten)	4
Dutch Albums (Album Top 100)	8
Finnish Albums (Suomen virallinen lista)	1
French Albums (SNEP)	36
German Albums (Offizielle Top 100)	99
Hungarian Albums (MAHASZ)	27
Italian Albums (FIMI)	8
Irish Albums (IRMA)	2
Japanese Albums (Oricon)	71
Mexican Albums (AMPROFON)	2
New Zealand Albums (RMNZ)	8
Polish Albums (ZPAV)	12
Spanish Albums (PROMUSICAE)	6
Swedish Albums (Sverigetopplistan)	10
Swiss Albums (Schweizer Hitparade)	69
UK Albums (OCC)	1
Worldwide	1

Chart (2014)	Position
Australian Albums (ARIA)	86
Belgian Albums (Ultratop Flanders)	39
Belgian Albums (Ultratop Wallonia)	60
Canadian Albums (Billboard)	4
Danish Albums (Hitlisten)	36
Dutch Albums (Album Top 100)	68
French Albums (SNEP)	36
Italian Albums (FIMI)	33
Japanese Albums (Oricon)	19
Mexican Albums (AMPROFON)	14
New Zealand Albums (RMNZ)	45
Spanish Albums (PROMUSICAE)	22
Swedish Albums (Sverigetopplistan)	19
Swiss Albums (Schweizer Hitparade)	36
UK Albums (OCC)	39
US Billboard 200	4

Chart (2015)	Position
Swedish Albums (Sverigetopplistan)	76
US Billboard 200	177

Chart (2020)	Position
Belgian Albums (Ultratop Flanders)	101
Danish Albums (Hitlisten)	82

Chart (2021)	Position
Belgian Albums (Ultratop Flanders)	82
Danish Albums (Hitlisten)	75

Chart (2022)	Position
Belgian Albums (Ultratop Flanders)	157

Chart (2023)	Position
Belgian Albums (Ultratop Flanders)	146

Chart (2024)	Position
Belgian Albums (Ultratop Flanders)	116

Chart (2025)	Position
Belgian Albums (Ultratop Flanders)	197

=== Decade-end charts ===
Chart (2010–2019)	Position
Australian Albums (ARIA)	79
UK Albums (OCC)	56
US Billboard 200	136

== Certifications and sales ==
Region	Certification	Certified units/sales
Argentina	2× Platinum	
Australia (ARIA)	3× Platinum	210,000^{‡}
Austria (IFPI Austria)	Platinum	15,000^{*}
Belgium (BRMA)	Gold	15,000^{*}
Brazil (Pro-Música Brasil)	3× Platinum	120,000^{*}
Canada (Music Canada)	2× Platinum	160,000^{^}
Chile	4× Platinum	40,000
Colombia	4× Platinum	
Denmark (IFPI Danmark)	5× Platinum	100,000^{‡}
Ecuador	Gold	
Finland (Musiikkituottajat)	Platinum	36,182
France (SNEP)	Platinum	100,000^{*}
Germany (BVMI)	Gold	100,000^{‡}
Hungary (MAHASZ)	Platinum	2,000^{^}
Ireland (IRMA)	3× Platinum	45,000^{^}
Italy (FIMI)	3× Platinum	150,000^{*}
Japan (RIAJ)	Platinum	250,000^{^}
Mexico (AMPROFON)	Diamond+Gold	330,000^{‡}
Netherlands (NVPI)	Platinum	50,000^{^}
New Zealand (RMNZ)	4× Platinum	60,000^{‡}
Peru	Platinum+Gold	
Philippines (PARI)	2× Platinum	30,000^{*}
Poland (ZPAV)	2× Platinum	40,000^{*}
Portugal (AFP)	Platinum	15,000^{^}
Spain (Promusicae)	2× Platinum	80,000^{^}
Sweden (GLF)	2× Platinum	80,000^{‡}
Switzerland (IFPI Switzerland)	Platinum	20,000^{^}
United Kingdom (BPI)	4× Platinum	1,200,000^{‡}
United States (RIAA)	3× Platinum	3,000,000^{‡}
Uruguay	5× Platinum	
Venezuela	Diamond+Platinum	
Summaries
Europe (IFPI)	Platinum	1,000,000^{*}
^{*} Sales figures based on certification alone.^{^} Shipments figures based on certification alone.^{‡} Sales+streaming figures based on certification alone.

== Release history ==
Country	Date	Format(s)	Edition(s)
Australia	25 November 2013	CD; digital download	Standard; deluxe
Canada	25 November 2013	CD; digital download	Standard; deluxe
France	25 November 2013	CD; digital download	Standard; deluxe
Germany	25 November 2013	CD; digital download	Standard; deluxe
Italy	25 November 2013	CD; digital download	Standard; deluxe
United Kingdom	25 November 2013	CD; digital download	Standard; deluxe
United States	25 November 2013	CD; digital download	Standard; deluxe
Spain	26 November 2013	CD; digital download	Standard; deluxe
Poland	26 November 2013	CD; digital download	Standard; deluxe
Japan	27 November 2013	CD; digital download	Standard; deluxe
China	10 March 2014	CD	deluxe
