= Best Song Ever =

2013 single by One Direction

Single by One Direction

from the album Midnight Memories
- Released: 22 July 2013
- Recorded: December 2012
- Genre: Power pop
- Length: 3:22
- Label: Syco; Columbia
- Songwriters: Wayne Hector; John Ryan; Ed Drewett; Julian Bunetta
- Producers: Julian Bunetta; John Ryan; Matt Rad

One Direction singles chronology
"One Way or Another (Teenage Kicks)" (2013)	"Best Song Ever" (2013)	"Story of My Life" (2013)

Music video
- "Best Song Ever" on YouTube

"Best Song Ever" is a song recorded by the English-Irish boy band One Direction. It was released on 22 July 2013 by Syco as the lead single from the group's third studio album, Midnight Memories. The song was written and composed by Wayne Hector, Ed Drewett, Matt Rad, along with the band's regular collaborators Julian Bunetta and John Ryan.

"Best Song Ever" debuted and peaked at number two on both the UK Singles Chart and the US Billboard Hot 100 (kept off the top by Avicii's "Wake Me Up" and Robin Thicke's "Blurred Lines" respectively), making it their highest-charting single in the United States to date.

== Composition ==
The song is written in the key of D-flat major with a tempo of 120 beats per minute. It follows a chord progression of G♭-D♭-A♭.

== Critical response ==
Most critics agreed that the song was good, but some claimed that the song did not live up to its title. For example, Will Hermes from Rolling Stone gave "Best Song Ever" a score of 4 out of 5 stars, describing the track as "pretty irresistible". Lewis Corner at Digital Spy also awarded the song 4 out of 5 stars, writing: "Sure the lyrics are cheesier than a 6-pack of Wotsits, and yes the sentiment is cornier than a Disney Channel rom-com, but as far as boyband pop anthems go it skirts dangerously close to fulfilling its title."

In the course of a debate on Twitter, it was noted the song's basic structure was similar to "Baba O'Riley" (1971) by the Who. Fans suggested the "Best Song Ever" was copied from the Who's song. Who guitarist Pete Townshend responded to the claims by denying that the Who were pursuing legal action, and stated that he was a fan of One Direction's single and was happy that One Direction appeared to have been influenced by the Who, just as he had been by his own guitar heroes such as Eddie Cochran.

== Music video ==
The music video for "Best Song Ever" was directed by Ben Winston and written by comedian James Corden. Filmed over two days at The Temple House in Miami Beach, Florida, the video was released on the band's Vevo channel on 22 July 2013.

The video is over six minutes long and features the band arguing with clueless studio executives in a battle over the band's new image. Niall Horan plays studio executive Harvey (Harvey Weinstein), Louis Tomlinson plays studio executive Jonny (modelled after Tom Cruise's character Les Grossman in the movie Tropic Thunder), and Zayn Malik plays "The Sexy Assistant", Veronica. The studio executives are stoked to take the band to the proverbial next level, but they proceed to bring in an under-qualified crew consisting of Marcel, "The Marketing Guy" (Harry Styles) and Leeroy, "The Choreographer" (Liam Payne). Interspersed with scenes from their film One Direction: This Is Us, the band are shown wreaking havoc throughout the office and even throwing in a few dance moves for good measure.

The music video won a British Video at the 2014 Brit Awards on 19 February 2014.

The video broke the Vevo 24-hour record with 12.3 million views, surpassing the 10.7 million views of Miley Cyrus' "We Can't Stop" in June, although the record was later broken again by Cyrus' follow-up music video "Wrecking Ball", which garnered 19.3 million views.

The video and song were previewed during the premiere for the Disney Channel Original Movie Teen Beach Movie three days ahead of the song's release. The band also filmed promotional videos that aired during the film's commercial breaks.

== Live performances ==
The group performed "Best Song Ever" live for the first time on 30 July 2013 at the SAP Center in San Jose, California during their Take Me Home Tour concert until their final live show in Japan. The song was subsequently added to the set list to all proceeding shows of the American leg. The group's first televised performance of the single was at the 2013 Teen Choice Awards on 11 August. The group also performed the song, along with some of their other hits, on The Today Show on 23 August, on America's Got Talent on 28 August, and again on The X Factor Australia on 27 October. On 15 November, the group performed "Best Song Ever" for the first time on British television at Children in Need 2013. Since its release, the song closed out all concerts for the 2014 Where We Are Tour and the 2015 On the Road Again Tour.

== In popular culture ==
Musicians such as Gabrielle Aplin and The Vamps have covered "Best Song Ever". "Weird Al" Yankovic also covered the song as part of his polka medley "NOW That's What I Call Polka!" for his 2014 album Mandatory Fun. In the 100th episode of Mad, there is a sketch where One Direction watches the show and sings a parody of "Best Song Ever" calling it the worst show ever. "Best Song Ever" was also covered by Munch's Make Believe Band, the fictional band featured in Chuck E. Cheese's restaurants, in the fall of 2014.

== Track listings ==
CD single
No.	Title	Writer(s)	Length
1.	"Best Song Ever"	Hector; Ryan; Bunetta; Drewett	3:22
2.	"Last First Kiss" (Live Version from the Motion Picture One Direction: This Is Us)	Albin Nedler; Kristoffer Fogelmark; Rami Yacoub; Cark Falk; Savan Kotecha; Zayn Malik; Liam Payne; Louis Tomlinson

Maxi single
No.	Title	Writer(s)	Length
1.	"Best Song Ever"	Hector; Ryan; Bunetta; Drewett	3:22
2.	"Best Song Ever" (Jump Smokers Remix)	Hector; Ryan; Bunetta; Drewett	3:08
3.	"Best Song Ever" (Westfunk & Steve Smart Remix)	Hector; Ryan; Bunetta; Drewett	3:05
4.	"Last First Kiss" (Live Version from the Motion Picture One Direction: This Is Us)		4:27

== Credits and personnel ==
Credits adapted from Tidal.

- Matt Radosevich – producer, bass, engineer, guitar, keyboards, programming, vocal
- John Ryan – producer, songwriting, background vocal, engineer
- Julian Bunetta – producer, songwriting, background vocal, engineer
- Ed Drewett – songwriting
- Wayne Hector – songwriting
- Ian Franzino – assistant engineer, background vocal
- Ruth Cunningham – background vocal
- Damon Bunetta – background vocal
- Stefan Litrownik – drums
- Petro Anastos-Prastacos – editor, vocal
- Alex Oriet – engineer
- John Hanes – engineer
- Tom Coyne – mastering engineer
- Serban Ghenea – mixing engineer

== Charts ==
=== Weekly charts ===
Chart (2013–2014)	Peak position
Australia (ARIA)	4
Austria (Ö3 Austria Top 40)	17
Belgium (Ultratop 50 Flanders)	12
Belgium (Ultratop 50 Wallonia)	17
Brazil (Billboard Brasil Hot 100)	59
Brazil Hot Pop Songs	19
Canada Hot 100 (Billboard)	2
Czech Republic Airplay (ČNS IFPI)	19
Denmark (Tracklisten)	2
Euro Digital Song Sales (Billboard)	4
France (SNEP)	12
Germany (GfK)	20
Greece Digital Songs (Billboard)	8
Hungary (Editors' Choice Top 40)	34
Hungary (Single Top 40)	4
Ireland (IRMA)	2
Italy (FIMI)	3
Japan Hot 100 (Billboard)	24
Lebanon (The Official Lebanese Top 20)	12
Mexico Anglo (Monitor Latino)	4
Netherlands (Dutch Top 40)	16
Netherlands (Single Top 100)	5
New Zealand (Recorded Music NZ)	3
Norway (VG-lista)	20
Scottish Singles Sales (Official Charts)	2
Slovakia Airplay (ČNS IFPI)	50
Slovenia (SloTop50)	40
South Africa Airplay (EMA)	8
South Korea (Gaon Music Chart)	11
Spain (Promusicae)	9
Sweden (Sverigetopplistan)	22
Switzerland (Schweizer Hitparade)	11
UK Singles (Official Charts)	2
UK Airplay (Music Week)	13
US Billboard Hot 100	2
US Adult Pop Airplay (Billboard)	40
US Pop Airplay (Billboard)	16
Venezuela Pop Rock General (Record Report)	2

=== Year-end charts ===
Chart (2013)	Position
Australia (ARIA)	97
Belgium (Ultratop Flanders)	96
Canada (Canadian Hot 100)	97
France (SNEP)	195
Netherlands (Dutch Top 40)	99
Netherlands (Single Top 100)	82
Taiwan (Hito Radio)	51
UK Singles (Official Charts Company)	50
US Billboard Hot 100	74

== Certifications ==
Region	Certification	Certified units/sales
Australia (ARIA)	3× Platinum	210,000^{‡}
Canada (Music Canada)	2× Platinum	160,000^{‡}
Italy (FIMI)	Gold	15,000^{‡}
Japan (RIAJ)	Gold	100,000^{*}
Mexico (AMPROFON)	Platinum+Gold	90,000^{‡}
New Zealand (RMNZ)	2× Platinum	60,000^{‡}
Spain (Promusicae)	Gold	30,000^{‡}
Sweden (GLF)	Gold	20,000^{‡}
United Kingdom (BPI)	2× Platinum	1,200,000^{‡}
United States (RIAA)	Platinum	1,275,000
Streaming
Denmark (IFPI Danmark)	Platinum	1,800,000^{†}
^{*} Sales figures based on certification alone.^{‡} Sales+streaming figures based on certification alone.^{†} Streaming-only figures based on certification alone.

== Release history ==
Country	Date	Format	Label
Australia	22 July 2013	Digital download	Sony
Germany	22 July 2013	Digital download	Sony
Italy	22 July 2013	Digital download	Sony
United Kingdom	22 July 2013	Digital download	Syco
United States	22 July 2013	Digital download	Columbia
United States	23 July 2013	Mainstream radio	Columbia
Germany	16 August 2013	Maxi single	Sony
France	19 August 2013	Maxi single	Sony
United Kingdom	19 August 2013	Maxi single	Syco
United States	20 August 2013	CD single	Columbia
Japan	21 August 2013	Maxi single	Sony
Italy	27 August 2013	Maxi single	Sony

== Awards ==
"Best Song Ever" won the award for Best Song of the Summer at the 2013 MTV Video Music Awards.

Year	Ceremony	Award	Result
2013	MTV Video Music Awards	Best Song of Summer	Won
2013	Rockbjörnen	Best International Song	Nominated
2013	World Music Awards	World's Best Song	Nominated
2013	World Music Awards	World's Best Video	Nominated

== See also ==
- "Tribute" by Tenacious D, another song about the greatest song
- "Baba O'Riley" by The Who
