= Jamie Scott =

English singer-songwriter and producer

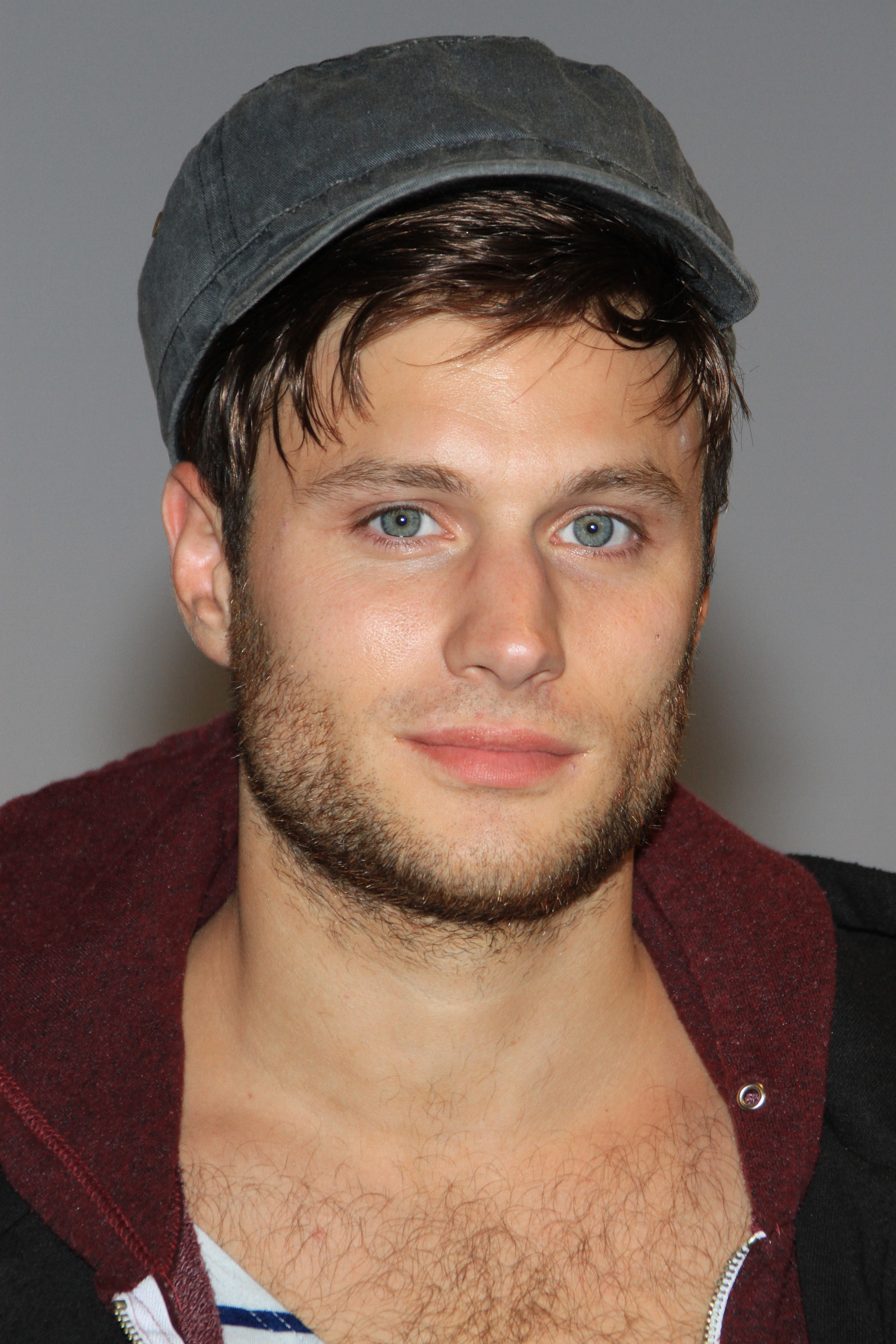

Background information
- Also known as: J.S. Baylin
- Born: James Christopher Needle; 12 February 1984 (age 42)
- Origin: Rowtown/Ottershaw, Surrey, England
- Genres: Indie; acoustic; alternative; folk
- Occupations: Singer; songwriter; producer
- Years active: 2002–present
- Labels: Sony BMG; Polydor; Capitol; Virgin; Catherine
- Website: jamie-scott.com

James Christopher Needle (born 12 February 1984), known professionally as Jamie Scott, is an English singer, songwriter and producer.

== Career ==
=== Songwriting ===
As a writer and producer Scott has sold over 100 million albums, 50 million singles, has had 17 UK No.1s, 11 US No.1s, and over 60 Top 10 albums & singles across the UK and US charts.

Scott has worked with many artists including One Direction, Tom Grennan, Joel Corry, Calvin Harris, Rag'n'Bone Man, Justin Bieber, Major Lazer, Rudimental, Jess Glynne, David Guetta, Martin Garrix, Jessie Ware, Enrique Iglesias, Little Mix, Christina Perri and Ed Sheeran.

No.1 songs co-written by Scott include "Cold Water" by Major Lazer & Justin Bieber, "These Days" by Rudimental, "Skin" by Rag'n'Bone Man, "Heartbeat" by Enrique Iglesias, & "Too Much to Ask" by Niall Horan.

Scott was the recipient of an Ivor Novello Award for his contribution to "These Days" by Rudimental in 2019, and was nominated for Song Of The Year at the Brit Awards for his production on Tom Grennan's hit "Little Bit of Love" in 2022.

Scott is one of the main collaborators of UK boy band One Direction, having co-written their hit singles "Story of My Life", "Drag Me Down", "Night Changes", "You & I", "Midnight Memories", "Home", and "More Than This". With One Direction, Scott achieved 5 No.1 Albums in the US & UK and generated more than 30 million worldwide record sales. Scott is the only collaborator to have worked on every One Direction album, and he played an instrumental role in the band's transition from teen-pop to a more mature, folk-oriented sound. Scott has continued to write with the band members on their solo records, most notably with Niall Horan and Louis Tomlinson. Scott's compositions "This Town", "Too Much to Ask", and "Put a Little Love on Me" by Niall Horan were all released as singles and all achieved Billboard Top10 spots.

Scott was the executive producer of Rag'n'Bone Man's debut album Human, co-writing four songs including the hit single "Skin". The album debuted at No1 on the UK Albums Chart, and became the fastest-selling debut album by a male artist in ten years.

Scott has written and produced music under the pseudonym J.S. Baylin.

=== Solo music career ===
According to his website, Scott never listened to popular, contemporary music while growing up. He began his musical career wanting to write music for other artists to perform, but when sending his demo tape to publishers, they would respond that they liked his voice and wanted him to release them himself. Because of this, Scott signed a record deal with Sony Music in 2002, teaming up with producer Toby Smith, keyboardist and songwriter from Jamiroquai, to work on a full-length album. During this time he toured with artists such as Alicia Keys, Amy Winehouse, Ryan Adams, Kelly Clarkson, Gabrielle, Mario Winans, and Ginuwine.

Scott's debut album, Soul Searching, was scheduled to be out in early 2005. However, due to the tumultuous merger of Sony Music & BMG, the release was delayed and ultimately cancelled.

In 2006, Scott featured in the movie, Step Up, playing the character Colin. He performs his song "Made" in the film.

In 2007, Scott signed to Polydor Records under the name Jamie Scott & The Town, and released the album Park Bench Theories the same year. The album was preceded by singles "When Will I See Your Face Again" & "Standing In The Rain".

In 2008, Scott started working with producer TommyD, releasing music under the name Graffiti6. The duo's debut song "Stare Into The Sun" was featured on various TV ad campaigns and appeared on FIFA 12. The pair signed with Capitol Records in the US in 2011, and released their debut album Colours in 2012. Their second album, "The Bridge", was released independently on 21 April 2014.

Scott toured with One Direction on their Where We Are Tour, opening for them on 5 nights, including 3 shows at the Rose Bowl in Pasadena, California.

Scott has released two solo albums through his own record label, Catherine Records: 2015's My Hurricane and 2020's How Still The River.

Scott wrote and features on 2017's "So Far Away" by Martin Garrix & David Guetta, and similarly he features on "Can't Stop The Beat" by Wally Lopez from 2013.

== Business ==
In 2015, Scott founded publishing & management company Catherine Songs to facilitate up and coming songwriters and artists. Catherine Songs roster includes Mike Needle, Dan Bryer, René Miller, Tom Williams, Michael Hemmings, & River Matthews. Scott is a director of production/record company BSW Music, whose signings include Bow Anderson & Low Lying Sun.

== Awards and nominations ==
Grammy Awards

Year	Nominee / work	Award	Result
2022	"Hero"	Best Dance/Electronic Recording	Nominated

BRIT Award

Year	Nominee / work	Award	Result
2022	"Little Bit of Love"	Song of the Year	Nominated

Ivor Novello Award

Year	Nominee / work	Award	Result
2019	"These Days"	PRS for Music Award	Won

American Music Awards

Year	Nominee / work	Award	Result
2013	Take Me Home	Rock/Pop Album of the Year	Won

Latin Grammy Award

Year	Nominee / work	Award	Result
2011	Euphoria	Album of the Year	Nominated

== Filmography ==
Actor

- Step Up (2006)—as Colin
