= Story of My Life (One Direction song) =

Single by One Direction

from the album Midnight Memories
- Released: 28 October 2013
- Recorded: 2013
- Genre: Folk rock; folktronica
- Length: 4:05 (album version); 3:37 (radio edit)
- Label: Columbia; Syco
- Songwriters: Julian Bunetta; Jamie Scott; John Ryan; Louis Tomlinson; Liam Payne; Niall Horan; Harry Styles; Zayn Malik
- Producers: Julian Bunetta; John Ryan

One Direction singles chronology
"Best Song Ever" (2013)	"Story of My Life" (2013)	"Midnight Memories" (2014)

Music video
- "Story of My Life" on YouTube

"Story of My Life" is a song recorded by English-Irish boy band One Direction. It was released on 28 October 2013 by Syco Music and Columbia Records as the second single from the group's third studio album, Midnight Memories (2013). The song was written by band members Niall Horan, Zayn Malik, Harry Styles, Liam Payne, and Louis Tomlinson, along with Julian Bunetta, Jamie Scott and John Ryan. The lyrics speak of a tumultuous relationship leading to lament and heartbreak.

== Composition ==
"Story of My Life" is an acoustic folktronica song with indie folk elements. It runs for four minutes and five seconds. Idolator compared the song to the works of Ed Sheeran, Coldplay, and Mumford & Sons. The song is written and recorded in E♭ major. According to musicnotes.com, the song runs at 120 beats per minute. This song was mixed by Joe Zook.

== Critical reception ==
The song was met with critical acclaim. Sam Lanksy of Idolator called the song "surprisingly great" and noted it was a "mature midpoint" between the group's signature "rollicking pop-rock confection[s]" and "dreary ballads". Lanksy additionally called the song "merciful" and complimented it for using alternative-folk influences without "smell[ing] like spilled beer". Amy Sciarretto of PopCrush gave the song 4 out of 5 stars, calling it a "contemplative, acoustic guitar-driven song" and complimenting it for being "more memorable" than any of the group's previous works. Sciarretto noted that the song would resonate with listeners of many different ages and showed that One Direction "isn't just a boy band"; although noted the song was not as "crazy catchy" as their previous songs. Lauren Wheeler of TheCelebrityCafe.com gave the song 5 out of 5 stars, noting that the lyrics were "reflective" and "much deeper than some of their bigger hits." Wheeler added that the song showed that One Direction "not only have range, but also have matured through their music."

== Chart performance ==
On 31 October 2013, the song debuted at number one on the Irish Singles Chart, becoming One Direction's fourth number-one single in Ireland. The song also debuted at number one in New Zealand, becoming both their second number-one debut and single on the New Zealand Singles Chart. It reached number two in the UK, kept off the top by Lily Allen's cover of "Somewhere Only We Know". In Australia, the song debuted at number three on the ARIA Charts and has since been certified Gold.

In the United States, it charted at number six, giving the band their fourth U.S. top ten single. It has charted in the top 15 for 19 weeks, seven of those in the top 10, and has become the band's second-highest selling single in the U.S. after their debut single "What Makes You Beautiful" (2011). The song also reached number one on the Adult Pop Songs chart, becoming One Direction's first number one on a U.S. airplay chart. It has sold 2.8 million digital copies in the U.S. as of June 2016.

Following Liam Payne's death in October 2024, the song saw a surge in sales and streams. The Official Charts Company showed "Story of My Life" place at number 21 on the UK Midweek Singles Chart. It re-entered the UK Singles Chart Top 100 at number 9 on 25 October 2024.

== Music video ==
Three days before the music video was uploaded, three teasers were posted, once each day. Band members Zayn Malik and Liam Payne also posted a picture from the video, with Malik posting a picture with his sister.

The set for the "Story of My Life" music video took five days to build. The director of the music video Ben Winston and his crew hung up a combination of 6,000 to 7,000 pictures that show an evolution of each of the members of One Direction over the years. This music video allows the Directioners (i.e., fans) to connect with each of the members on a more personal and intimate level by looking back at their childhood memories.

The video was directed by Ben Winston, who also directed the video for their previous single "Best Song Ever". The video was accidentally published and leaked by Vevo two days earlier when they intended to upload the second teaser for the music video, but it was immediately removed. It was then officially uploaded on 3 November 2013. The video features several of the band's family members: Zayn's sister, Harry's mother, Liam's parents and sisters, Niall Horan's brother and Louis' grandparents (two of whom are now deceased). It starts in a dark room with the band developing photos. Afterwards, certain family photos for each member are shown, and the photos morph into the same family members doing a current recreation of the photos. Photos included in the video consist of: Zayn, aged 7, with his little sister; Louis, aged 8, with his grandparents; Harry, aged 4, with his mother; Niall, aged 4, with his brother being aged 10 when the photo was taken; Liam, aged 10, with his family.

The music video was widely praised for its depth and maturity, alongside the impressive execution of the photograph recreation segments, and is often regarded as one of the band's finest music videos. As of April 2025, the music video has reached 1 billion views.

== Cover versions ==
- In 2014, Kurt Hummel (Chris Colfer) and Blaine Anderson (Darren Criss) performed the song in the 2014 Glee episode "The Back-up Plan".
- In 2014, Filipino singer Timmy Pavino covered the song on The Voice of the Philippines.
- In 2014, The Piano Guys covered the song with piano and cello.
- In 2014, Lissie covered the song on her Cryin' to You EP.
- In January 2015, Martin Sexton recorded a solo acoustic version of the song at Electric Lady Studios.
- On 22 May 2015, The Offspring performed an acoustic version of "Story of My Life" for 94/7 Mobile Nation at Mississippi Studios.
- In 2015, Alvin and the Chipmunks and The Chipettes covered the song, with lyric changes to reflect their relationship with David Seville, for their live stage tour Alvin and the Chipmunks: The Musical.
- In 2016, Joey Graceffa and Luke Conrad covered the song.
- In 2017, the song appeared on Lea Salonga's live album Blurred Lines.
- On 12 February 2022, Natalie Imbruglia released the song after winning the third series of The Masked Singer UK as "Panda". The single debuted and peaked at number 47 on the UK Official Singles Sales Chart Top 100 on 18 February 2022.
- Hardy Becker, a musician based in Aachen, Germany, published a cover to Spotify on 3 June 2022.

== Track listing ==
- CD single
1. "Story of My Life" – 4:04
2. "Little Things" (live version from the motion picture One Direction: This Is Us) – 3:48
- Maxi single
1. "Story of My Life" – 4:04
2. "Story of My Life" (live X Factor performance) – 4:18
3. "Rock Me" (live version from the motion picture One Direction: This Is Us) – 4:18
4. "C'mon C'mon" (live version from the motion picture One Direction: This Is Us) – 3:28

== Charts ==
=== Weekly charts ===
Weekly chart performance
Chart (2013–2016)	Peak position
Australia (ARIA)	3
Austria (Ö3 Austria Top 40)	12
Belgium (Ultratop 50 Flanders)	3
Belgium (Ultratop 50 Wallonia)	14
Bulgaria Airplay (BAMP)	1
Brazil (Billboard Brasil Hot 100)	32
Brazil Hot Pop Songs	10
Canada Hot 100 (Billboard)	3
Czech Republic Airplay (ČNS IFPI)	6
Czech Republic Singles Digital (ČNS IFPI)	99
Denmark (Tracklisten)	1
Euro Digital Song Sales (Billboard)	2
Finland (Suomen virallinen lista)	17
Finland Airplay (Radiosoittolista)	30
France (SNEP)	22
Germany (GfK)	21
Greece Digital Songs (Billboard)	3
Hungary (Single Top 40)	14
Hungary (Stream Top 40)	9
Ireland (IRMA)	1
Israel International Airplay (Media Forest)	3
Italy (FIMI)	5
Japan Hot 100 (Billboard)	5
Lebanon (The Official Lebanese Top 20)	1
Luxembourg Digital Song Sales (Billboard)	8
Mexico Anglo (Monitor Latino)	1
Netherlands (Dutch Top 40)	20
Netherlands (Single Top 100)	3
New Zealand (Recorded Music NZ)	1
Norway (VG-lista)	11
Poland Airplay (ZPAV)	7
Portugal Digital Song Sales (Billboard)	4
Romania (Airplay 100)	37
Russia Airplay (Tophit)	77
Scottish Singles Sales (Official Charts)	3
Slovenia (SloTop50)	5
Spain (Promusicae)	1
South Africa Airplay (EMA)	10
South Korea International Chart (GAON)	11
Sweden (Sverigetopplistan)	8
Switzerland (Schweizer Hitparade)	13
Turkey (Number 1 TV)	3
UK Singles (Official Charts)	2
UK Airplay (Music Week)	1
US Billboard Hot 100	6
US Adult Contemporary (Billboard)	2
US Adult Pop Airplay (Billboard)	1
US Pop Airplay (Billboard)	4

Weekly chart performance following Liam Payne's death
Chart (2024–2025)	Peak position
Australia (ARIA)	28
Austria (Ö3 Austria Top 40)	26
Canada Hot 100 (Billboard)	39
Denmark (Tracklisten)	25
Germany (GfK)	88
Global 200 (Billboard)	23
Greece International (IFPI)	32
Ireland (IRMA)	6
Italy (FIMI)	83
Malaysia International (RIM)	19
Netherlands (Single Top 100)	33
Norway (VG-lista)	25
Philippines (Philippines Hot 100)	38
Poland (Polish Streaming Top 100)	80
Portugal (AFP)	35
Singapore (RIAS)	29
Spain (Promusicae)	83
Sweden (Sverigetopplistan)	23
Switzerland (Schweizer Hitparade)	33
UK Singles (Official Charts)	9

=== Year-end charts ===
Annual chart rankings
Chart (2013)	Position
Australia (ARIA)	84
Netherlands (Dutch Top 40)	116
Netherlands (Single Top 100)	70
UK Singles (Official Charts Company)	46

Chart (2014)	Position
Austria (Ö3 Austria Top 40)	68
Brazil (Crowley)	72
Canada (Canadian Hot 100)	32
Germany (Official German Charts)	96
Italy (FIMI)	91
Japan (Japan Hot 100)	10
Japan Adult Contemporary (Billboard)	4
Slovenia (SloTop50)	36
Spain (PROMUSICAE)	30
Sweden (Sverigetopplistan)	91
US Billboard Hot 100	24
US Adult Contemporary (Billboard)	3
US Adult Top 40 (Billboard)	14
US Mainstream Top 40 (Billboard)	27

Chart (2016)	Position
Slovenia (SloTop50)	41

== Certifications ==
Certifications and sales
Region	Certification	Certified units/sales
Australia (ARIA)	4× Platinum	280,000^{‡}
Canada (Music Canada)	4× Platinum	320,000^{‡}
Denmark (IFPI Danmark)	2× Platinum	180,000^{‡}
Germany (BVMI)	3× Gold	450,000^{‡}
Italy (FIMI)	Platinum	30,000^{‡}
Japan (RIAJ)	Platinum	250,000^{*}
Mexico (AMPROFON)	Platinum+Gold	90,000^{*}
New Zealand (RMNZ)	4× Platinum	120,000^{‡}
Norway (IFPI Norway)	5× Platinum	50,000^{‡}
Spain (Promusicae)	2× Platinum	120,000^{‡}
Sweden (GLF)	Gold	20,000^{‡}
Switzerland (IFPI Switzerland)	Gold	15,000^{^}
United Kingdom (BPI)	3× Platinum	1,800,000^{‡}
United States (RIAA)	3× Platinum	3,000,000^{‡}
Streaming
Denmark (IFPI Danmark)	Platinum	1,800,000^{†}
Greece (IFPI Greece)	Platinum	2,000,000^{†}
Japan (RIAJ)	Gold	50,000,000^{†}
Spain (Promusicae)	Gold	4,000,000^{†}
^{*} Sales figures based on certification alone.^{^} Shipments figures based on certification alone.^{‡} Sales+streaming figures based on certification alone.^{†} Streaming-only figures based on certification alone.

== Release history ==
Release dates and formats for "Story of My Life"
Region	Date	Format	Label(s)	Ref.
United States	29 October 2013	Mainstream airplay	Columbia	
