= Billboard Greece =

Greek online magazine

- Billboard Greece logo
- Website type: Online magazine
- Available in: Greek
- Website: billboard.com.gr
- Commercial: Yes
- Registration: None
- Launched: 18 March 2011

Billboard Greece is a Greek online magazine that launched on 18 March 2011. It serves as the localized version of Billboard, also featuring independent coverage of both Greek and international music repertoire.

== Background ==
"Billboard" was first presented to the Greek public in the 1970s. Yannis Petrides was the one who presented the top 10, with some shortcomings, from his radio show, where he also regularly presented various reports from the magazine.

The full presentation of the top 10 singles and albums, and later the top 20, began in 1976 on the radio show "Studio 344" hosted by Akis Evenis on the B. Program of ERT. The presentation would take place every Friday, a week earlier than the official publication of Billboard in the United States, as he would receive the charts directly from Voice of America.

On 2 February 2011, it was announced that a Greek version of Billboard called Billboard Greece would launch online by the end of the month. The date was later pushed back to 14 March 2011, then once again to 18 March 2011.

== Content ==
Billboard Greece is an online magazine, featuring independent coverage, but also works closely with Billboard and has access to its exclusive press content. Billboard Greece covers all genres of music, and is not limited to specific types only. At launch, it planned to allocate 70% of its coverage to international repertoire and 30% to domestic repertoire.

The site also feature interviews of artists—both written and on video—as well as exclusive broadcasts of songs, reviews of concerts in real time, reviews on albums and songs, tributes, and an agenda of all the music events taking place in Athens. Billboard Greece also plans to organize concerts and fan gatherings, and will support a wide range of music event in all of Greece.

== Charts ==
Billboard Greece currently includes the following domestic and international charts, and plans to add more in the future:

International

- Billboard 200
- Billboard Hot 100
- Dance Club Songs

Domestic

- Billboard Greek Airplay
- MTV Hit List (MTV Greece)

== Contributors ==
Giannis Petridis serves as the consultant of Billboard Greece, with Maria Markouli and Dimitris Kanellopoulos serving as head editors. The contributing photographers are Olga K. and Nikos Maravegias, while the editorial team is made up of high-profile editors in music reporting, amongst them:

- Katerina Kafentzi (En Lefko 87.7)
- Giorgos Mouhtaridis
- Haris Pontida
- Matoula Kousteni (Eleftherotypia)
- Nikos Triantfillidis
- Giannis Papaefthimiou
- Evi Eleftheriadou
- Tina Pappa
- Efi Papazahariou
- Vasia Tzanakari
- Maro Papanagiotakopoulou
- Spiros Dimas
- Fotis Valatos (LiFo)
- Theodoris Mihos (Esquire)
- Inkrint Kehagi
- Fotini Kokkinaki
- Aris Karapeazis
- Giannis Papagopoulos (Ethnos)
- Nikos Petropoulakis (105.5 Sto Kokkino)
- Thodoris Kanellopoulos (Imako)
- Ermis Theodoropoulos
- Markos Fragkos
- Manolis Kilsmanis
- Klimentini Markou
