= Everything I Need I Get from You =

Book by Kaitlyn Tiffany

Everything I Need I Get from You: How Fangirls Created the Internet as We Know It
- Author: Kaitlyn Tiffany
- Language: English
- Genre: Non-fiction
- Publisher: Farrar, Straus and Giroux
- Publication date: 14 June 2022
- Pages: 320
- ISBN: 978-0-374-53918-4
- Dewey Decimal: 004.678082
- LC Class: HQ1178 .T54 2022

Everything I Need I Get from You: How Fangirls Created the Internet as We Know It is a 2022 book by journalist Kaitlyn Tiffany. It covers online fandom, especially of the band One Direction, and the author's personal experiences of it. Tiffany aimed to challenge stereotypes of fangirls, and interviewed a number of One Direction fans.

The book received positive reviews from critics, who described it as humorous and well-informed. It was included on several lists of 2022's best books.

== Background ==
One Direction was a British-Irish boy band, consisting of Niall Horan, Zayn Malik, Liam Payne, Harry Styles, and Louis Tomlinson. The band was formed on The X Factor in 2011. Their fan community often used social media platforms such as Tumblr and Twitter, and were known for their dedication. Tiffany wrote that Everything I Need I Get from You was not about the band, describing them as "not that interesting."

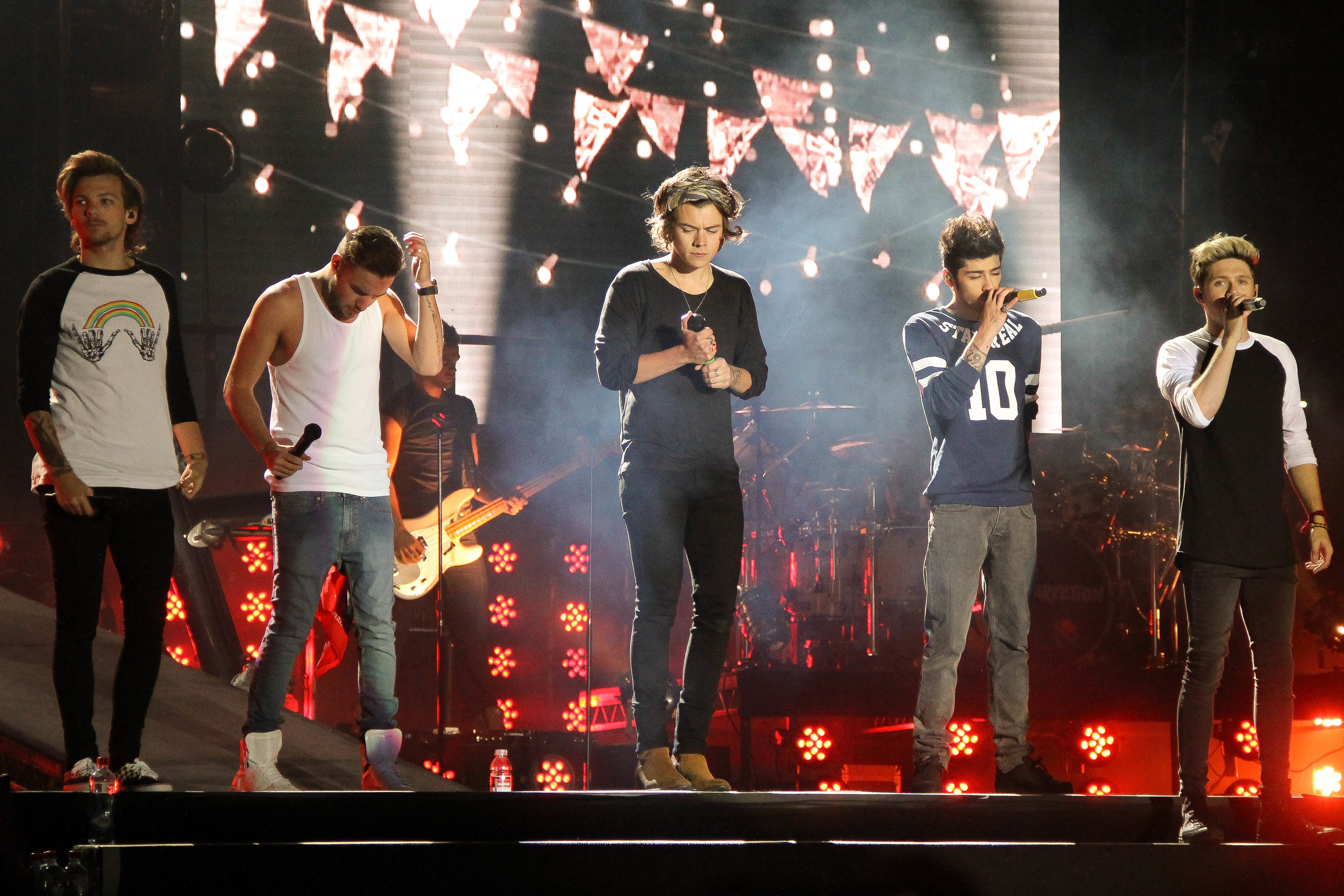
One Direction. Some fans believe that Louis Tomlinson (far left) and Harry Styles (centre) are in a secret relationship.

Larries are a subset of One Direction fans who believe that Louis Tomlinson and Harry Styles are secretly in love. Larries rejected Tomlinson's denial of the theory. Some also insisted that his child was not real, in a conspiracy theory known as "Babygate".

Kaitlyn Tiffany wrote about Tumblr and fandoms for The Verge and The Atlantic, before writing Everything I Need I Get from You, which was her first book. She became a fan of One Direction at the age of nineteen.

=== Title ===
The book's title is a lyric from the 2015 One Direction song "I Want to Write You a Song", which Tiffany intended to be "a little bit creepy". The subtitle was intended to be "the broadest phrase... that semi-represented what the book was about."

== Research and writing ==
Tiffany described Everything I Need I Get from You as being written partially as a defence of herself as a fangirl. She felt that explanations of fandom culture for mainstream audiences were lacking, and noted a lack of work on female-dominated subcultures compared to coverage of male-dominated alt-right subcultures. She began thinking about the book in 2019, and pitched it the same year. It was originally intended to include "little pieces about different fandoms", but her agent criticised this idea.

In writing the book, Tiffany aimed to replace traditional "pretty thin" stereotypes of fans with "images of different fans who were using fandom for different purposes". She chose One Direction fandom as a subject due to her personal experiences, its visibility, and because "it felt like a really rich example of pop music fandom on the internet". Tiffany chose to ignore Justin Bieber, who was popular around the same time as One Direction, because she found him "annoying."

Tiffany described Larries as a complex and "painful" topic, noting the conflict the theory created between fans. Larries felt that their community "should be private", while non-Larries did not want the conspiracy to be "representative of the fandom."

Tiffany conducted a number of interviews for the book, many of which were arranged via Google Forms. She described an interview with a fan who left pictures of a pregnant Harry Styles around the US state of Utah as her favourite to conduct. Tiffany also used Tumblr and the Wayback Machine for research. In a 2022 podcast, Tiffany stated that very few Larries were willing to provide interviews.

Prior to publication, a reviewer told Tiffany not to explain how fans used virtual private networks to boost streaming numbers, as this may be illegal.

== Synopsis ==
The book begins with an introduction, which covers the history of One Direction and its fandom. Tiffany describes her own experiences as part of the fandom. The first chapter is titled "Screaming", and describes Beatlemania, comparing it to One Direction fandom. The second chapter, titled "Deep-frying" (in reference to deep fried memes), discusses "transformational fandom" (Note: as opposed to "mimetic" fandom, which passively celebrates "canon") and real person fiction.

In the third chapter, "Shrines", Tiffany describes a visit to a Los Angeles roadside where Harry Styles once vomited. A fan created a sign commemorating the vomit, placed it on the site, and posted about it online. The chapter discusses internet history and archiving. It ends with a description of an interview that Tiffany conducted with the creator of the sign.

The fourth chapter, "Trending", describes the history of social media, especially Stan Twitter, and harassment campaigns, including one that was directed at Tiffany when she announced the book. The chapter ends with a celebration of One Direction's tenth anniversary. Chapter Five, "Trash" describes how people become fans, the relationship between fandom and consumerism, and fan identity. It also describes Tiffany's fandom of Harry Styles, and her mother's fandom of Bruce Springsteen.

Chapter Six is titled "Promo". It discusses fan campaigns such as the One Direction fandom's attempts to promote the song No Control, and recounts an interview with the "Harry Fairy", a woman who distributed pictures of a pregnant Harry Styles around the US state of Utah in 2019.

Chapter Seven ("Secrets") covers Larries, including their views, and opposition to them. It discusses other similar real-person ships, and the response to the documentary Crazy About One Direction, which was falsely rumoured to have caused forty-two suicides. Chapter Eight, ("Proof"), focuses on "Babygate", which alleged that Louis Tomlinson's child was faked. It describes suspicion of Tomlinson's then partner, a dispute the Larries had with the writer Richard Lawson, and fans who also disputed the parentage or reality of Liam Payne and Zayn Malik's children.

Chapter Nine ("Belonging"), discusses fan activism, including Black Harries (fans of Harry Styles who campaigned for him to support the Black Lives Matter movement) and Rainbow Direction (an organisation for LGBTQ+ One Direction fans). The tenth and final chapter, titled "Power", discusses the history of research into subcultures (especially bedroom culture), participation of K-pop fans in the George Floyd protests, and the relationship between K-pop fans and hackers from Anonymous.

The book ends with a conclusion, titled "1Dead", which is a nickname for One Direction used by fans. Tiffany recalls listening to a Harry Styles song after a break-up, and describes the commodification of fan culture. The conclusion is followed by a note on sources.

== Reception ==
Kirkus Reviews described the book as a "finely balanced pop-culture investigation", and praised its ethnographic analysis, noting the coverage of Larries. A starred review in Publishers Weekly described Tiffany as "archly self-aware", and praised her reframing of "the screaming fangirl". In The New York Times, Amanda Hess described Tiffany as "funny and perceptive", and noted how the book "contextualizes fandom as a culturewide coping mechanism and creative outlet". In a review for Reason, Jesse Walker described the book as "well-informed, witty," and "sometimes confessional."

In a review for Bookforum, author Erin Somers described the book as "elegantly written, evidence-based, and rational", while also being "off-kilter" and "animated by... loneliness". Somers described Tiffany's case for "the internet fangirl as a transgressive figure" as convincing, and highlighted the visit to the roadside where Harry Styles vomited.

A review in PopMatters described the book as "both lighthearted and erudite", highlighting Tiffany's personal accounts, and mentions of the work of cultural critics such as Theodor Adorno.

A review in Uproxx described Tiffany's decision to write the book as "undeniably brave", noting that she received hate from fans upon its announcement. The reviewer noted that Tiffany "primarily gave fans the benefit of the doubt", although they can "often cross boundaries". Writer Julie Phillips described the book as "compelling", "insightful", and "personal", noting an emphasis on the "joy and humor of fandom". Phillips also praised Tiffany's descriptions of abusive behaviour by fans, including Larries.

A review in The New Yorker described the book as "wistful, winning, and unexpectedly funny", and praised Tiffany's personal reflections, while stating that the personal reflections risked undermining broader points about collective power. In a review for NewCity Lit, Mara Sandroff described the book as "smart" and "empathetic", praising Tiffany's personal accounts. Sandroff noted that she found some examples, such as those related to Black Twitter, "more persuasive in their own contexts than against the broader thesis".

TIME named Everything I Need I Get from You as one of its 100 Must Read Books of 2022. The New York Times Book Review listed it as one of its 100 Notable Books of 2022. The New Yorker listed it as one of the best books of 2022.

In interviews for Interview and Vanity Fair, Tiffany noted that Larries responded negatively to the book.
