= One Direction =

English–Irish boy band (2010–2016)

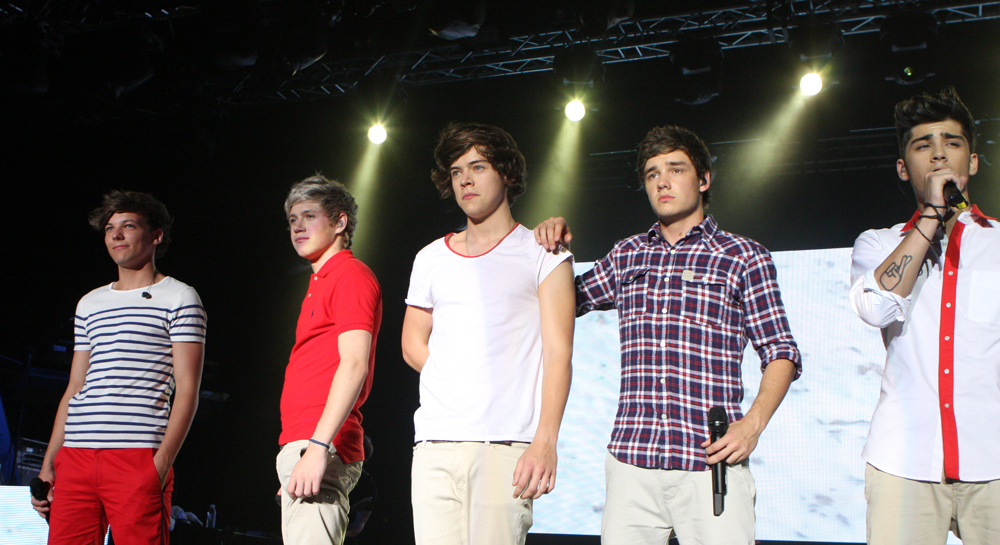
- One Direction in 2012; From left to right: Louis Tomlinson, Niall Horan, Harry Styles, Liam Payne, and Zayn Malik

Background information
- Origin: London, England
- Genres: Pop; pop rock
- Works: Discography; songs
- Years active: 2010–2016 (Note: Indefinite hiatus)
- Labels: Syco; Columbia
- Awards: Full list
- Past members: Niall Horan; Zayn Malik; Liam Payne; Harry Styles; Louis Tomlinson
- Website: onedirectionmusic.com

One Direction, often shortened to 1D, were an English–Irish pop boy band formed in London in 2010. The group consisted of Niall Horan, Liam Payne, Harry Styles, Louis Tomlinson and Zayn Malik (until his departure in 2015). The group sold over 70 million records worldwide, making them one of the best-selling boy bands of all time, before going on an indefinite hiatus in 2016.

Formed on the British singing competition show The X Factor in 2010, the group were propelled to global success by social media. One Direction's debut single "What Makes You Beautiful" was an international commercial success, reaching number one on the UK singles chart and being performed by the band at the 2012 Summer Olympics closing ceremony. They became the first British act to have their debut album top the charts on the Billboard 200 with Up All Night (2011), and subsequently became the first band to have their first four albums debut at number one following the releases of Take Me Home (2012), Midnight Memories (2013), and Four (2014). The band's fifth and final album prior to their hiatus was Made in the A.M. (2015).

Considered teen idols, One Direction were often subject to fan hysteria comparable to Beatlemania. They embarked on four world tours, two of which were all–stadium. The band's Where We Are Tour, in support of Midnight Memories, was the highest-grossing concert tour of 2014 and the highest-grossing tour by a vocal group in history, grossing $290 million. They have supported various charities, raising millions for causes like cancer research and autism, and spreading awareness of global issues such as poverty and climate change.

Worth over $1 billion, the band won nearly 200 awards, including seven Brit Awards, four MTV Video Music Awards, six Billboard Music Awards, and seven American Music Awards. As the world's best-selling artist of 2013, the group were named the Global Recording Artist of the Year by the International Federation of the Phonographic Industry. In 2014, Billboard named the band the Artist of the Year. Forbes ranked them as the fourth highest-earning celebrities in the world in 2015 and subsequently in second in 2016. The band went on an indefinite hiatus in January 2016, allowing all members to pursue solo projects.

== History ==
=== 2010–2011: The X Factor ===
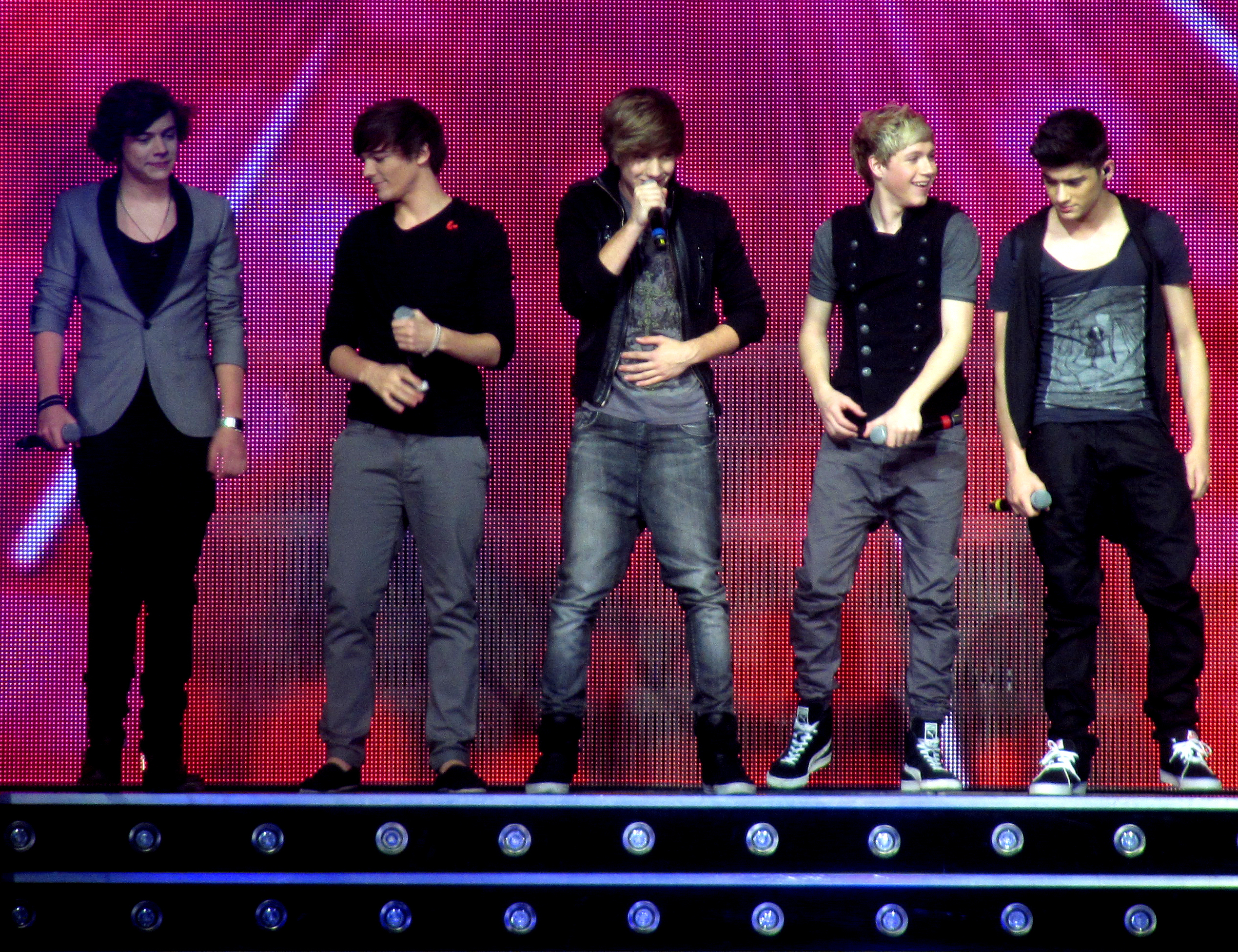
One Direction during The X Factor Live tour in 2011

Niall Horan, Zayn Malik, Liam Payne, Harry Styles, and Louis Tomlinson auditioned as solo candidates for the 2010 series of the British singing competition The X Factor. They all failed to progress in the "Boys" category at the bootcamp stage of the competition, but were instead put together to form a five-piece boy band on 23 July 2010, thus qualifying for the "Groups" category. The American singer Nicole Scherzinger, a guest judge, and long-time judge Simon Cowell both claimed to have come up with the idea of forming the band. In 2013, Cowell said that it "took [him] 10 minutes to put them together as a group". In 2022, The X Factor released previously unseen footage showing that Scherzinger did play a significant role in forming the band. The video revealed Horan being chosen as the band's first member, followed by Styles, Tomlinson, Payne, and Malik. Styles came up with the band's name, which has since been commonly abbreviated to 1D. For their qualifying song at the judges' houses, and their first song as a group, One Direction sang an acoustic version of "Torn". Cowell later commented that their performance convinced him that they "were confident, fun, like a gang of friends, and kind of fearless as well". Within the first four weeks of the live shows, they were his final act in the competition. The group quickly gained popularity in the UK, becoming a fan favourite on the show with a large online following.

One Direction were the last contestants eliminated in the competition behind Matt Cardle and Rebecca Ferguson. Immediately after the final, their song "Forever Young", which would have been released if they had won The X Factor 2010, was leaked onto the Internet. Shortly afterwards it was confirmed that One Direction had been signed by Cowell to a reported £2 million Syco Records record contract. Recording for their debut album began in January 2011, as they flew to Los Angeles to work with RedOne, a record producer. A book licensed by One Direction, One Direction: Forever Young (Our Official X Factor Story), was published by HarperCollins in February 2011. The same month, the boy band and other contestants from the series participated in the X Factor Live Tour. During the tour, the group performed for 500,000 people throughout the UK. After the tour concluded in April 2011, the group continued working on their debut album.

The X Factor results
Episode	Song Choice	Theme	Result	Ref.
Auditions	Harry Styles: "Hey, Soul Sister" / "Isn't She Lovely"	Free Choice	Advanced to bootcamp, where they were eliminated individually; One Direction is formed and advances to judges' houses	
Auditions	Zayn Malik: "Let Me Love You"	Free Choice	Advanced to bootcamp, where they were eliminated individually; One Direction is formed and advances to judges' houses	
Auditions	Liam Payne: "Cry Me a River"	Free Choice	Advanced to bootcamp, where they were eliminated individually; One Direction is formed and advances to judges' houses	
Auditions	Niall Horan: "So Sick"	Free Choice	Advanced to bootcamp, where they were eliminated individually; One Direction is formed and advances to judges' houses	
Auditions	Louis Tomlinson: "Elvis Ain't Dead" / "Hey There Delilah"	Free Choice	Advanced to bootcamp, where they were eliminated individually; One Direction is formed and advances to judges' houses	
Judges' Houses	"Torn"	Free Choice	Advanced to the live shows	
Live Show 1	"Viva la Vida"	Number-One Singles	Safe (4th) – 10.04%	
Live Show 2	"My Life Would Suck Without You"	Musical Heroes	Safe (3rd) – 9.84%	
Live Show 3	"Nobody Knows"	Guilty Pleasures	Safe (3rd) – 11.08%	
Live Show 4	"Total Eclipse of the Heart"	Halloween	Safe (4th) – 11.79%	
Live Show 5	"Kids in America"	American Anthems	Safe (3rd) – 12.13%	
Live Show 6	"Something About the Way You Look Tonight"	Songs By Elton John	Safe (3rd) – 14.44%	
Live Show 7	"All You Need Is Love"	Songs By the Beatles	Safe (4th) – 12.65%	
Quarter-Final	"Summer of '69"	Rock	Safe (4th) – 11.90%	
Quarter-Final	"You Are So Beautiful"	Rock	Safe (4th) – 11.90%	
Semi-Final	"Only Girl (In the World)"	Club Classics	Safe (3rd) – 17.38%	
Semi-Final	"Chasing Cars"	Song To Get You Into The Final	Safe (3rd) – 17.38%	
Final	"Your Song"	Free Choice	Safe (3rd) – 18.54%	
Final	"She's the One" (with Robbie Williams)	Celebrity Duet	Safe (3rd) – 18.54%	
Final	"Torn"	Free Choice	Eliminated (3rd) – 20.72%	

=== 2011–2012: Up All Night ===
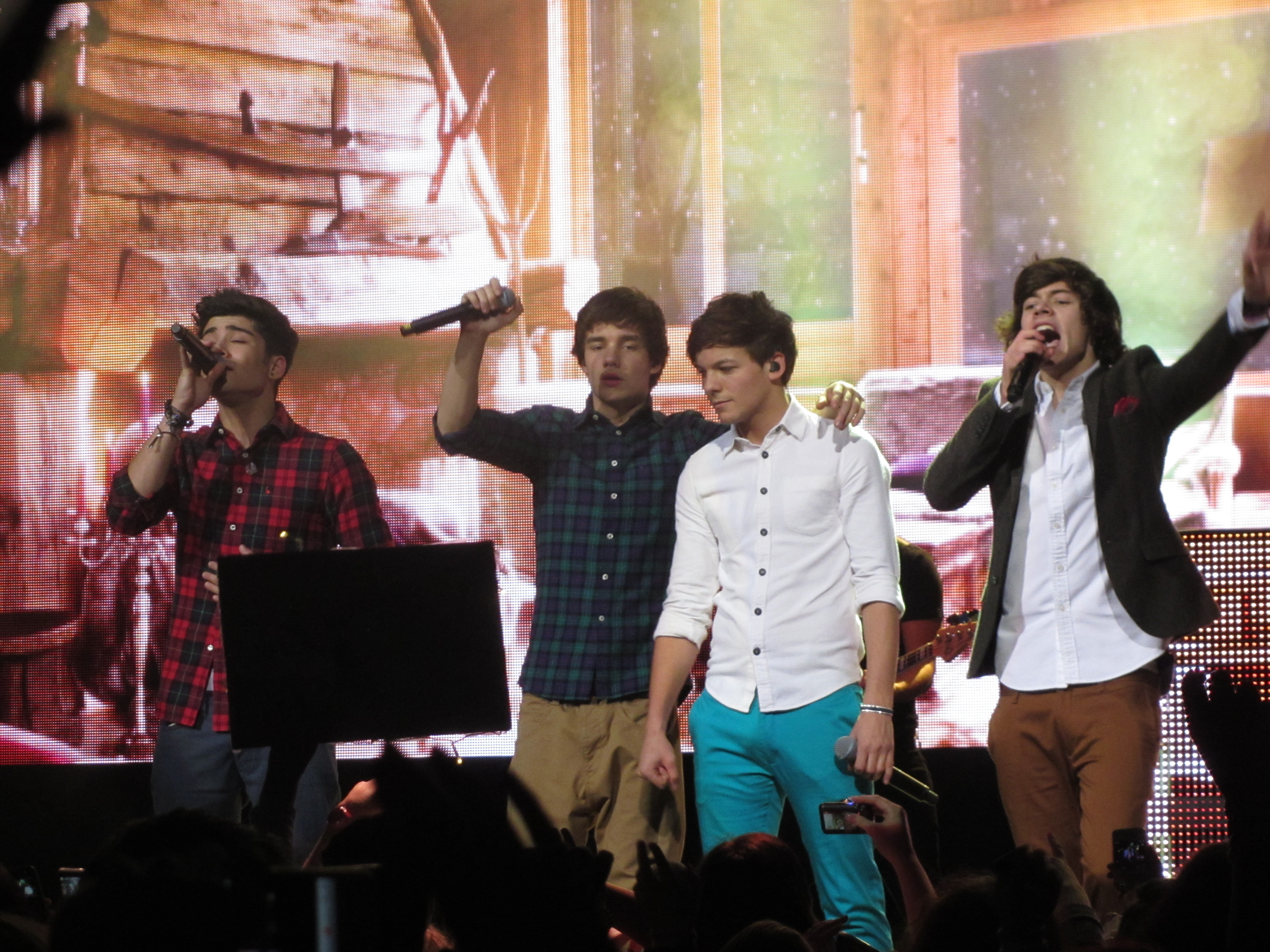
One Direction performing on their Up All Night Tour, January 2012

Released in September 2011 in the UK and Ireland, One Direction's debut single, "What Makes You Beautiful", was a commercial and international success. It reached number one on the UK Singles Chart after becoming the most pre-ordered Sony Music Entertainment single in history. Subsequent singles, "Gotta Be You" and "One Thing", peaked in the UK Singles Chart top ten. In November 2011, One Direction signed a record deal with Columbia Records in North America. Steve Barnett, the co-chairman of Columbia Records, said it was not a difficult decision to sign the band, stating that he "thought there was a void, and maybe they could seize and hold it." That same month, they released Up All Night, their debut studio album, in the UK and Ireland. Critically commended for its appeal to the teenage audience, it became the UK's fastest-selling debut album of 2011 and the first debut album by a British band to reach number one on US charts. In December 2011, they embarked on their first headlining UK concert tour, the Up All Night Tour, with tickets selling out in 12 minutes. Critics praised the group's musical performances and popularity whilst on tour, and a recording of a concert from the tour, Up All Night: The Live Tour, was released in May 2012. The DVD topped the charts in 25 countries, selling more than 1 million copies by August 2012.

Upon One Direction's arrival in the US in February 2012, the group embarked on a radio promotion spree, as well as their first North American concert tour as an opening act for Big Time Rush, opening 16 shows after they had completed the first leg of the Up All Night Tour. That month, they announced that an Oceania leg had been added to the tour. They made their first US television appearance on The Today Show, at the Rockefeller Center; an estimated 15,000 fans gathered on the plaza. "What Makes You Beautiful" was officially released in the United States that same month, where it debuted on the Billboard Hot 100 at number 28, becoming the highest debut for a British act in more than a decade. By June 2016, it would sell 4.8 million copies in the US, and over 7 million copies worldwide. Up All Night was released internationally in March, and One Direction became the first UK group to have their debut album reach number one in the US, inducted into the Guinness World Records as a result. After the album's international release, it topped the charts in 16 countries. Up All Night had sold over 3 million copies worldwide by August 2012. It was the third best-selling album in the world that year, selling 4.5 million copies.

One Direction starred in an episode of American sitcom iCarly in April 2012. One Direction's first book to be licensed in America, Dare to Dream: Life as One Direction, was published in the US in May 2012 and topped The New York Times Best Seller list. In June 2012, Nick Gatfield, the chairman and chief executive officer of Sony Music Entertainment UK, said that he expected One Direction to represent a $100 million business empire by 2013. In August 2012, the group's record sales exceeded 8 million singles, 3 million albums, and 1 million DVDs. They performed "What Makes You Beautiful" at the 2012 Summer Olympics closing ceremony in London the same month. On 6 September 2012, One Direction won the most awards at the 2012 MTV Video Music Awards, receiving all three awards for which they were nominated, including Best New Artist.

In April 2012, an American pop rock band that went by the same name filed a trademark infringement lawsuit. According to the lawsuit, the US band had been using the name since 2009, recorded two albums and filed an application to register the trademark name in the US in February 2011. The US band said they were entitled to three times the profits made by the UK band, as well as compensatory damages in excess of US$1 million. The lawsuit claimed that Syco and Sony Music "chose to ignore the plaintiff's rights and wilfully infringed them" after they realised in early 2011 that the two bands shared the same name. The BBC reported in September 2012 that the UK group won the legal dispute over the right to keep using their band name, and the US band changed its name to Uncharted Shores. The change of name was announced in a joint statement that also noted both groups were happy with the outcome.

=== 2012–2013: Take Me Home ===
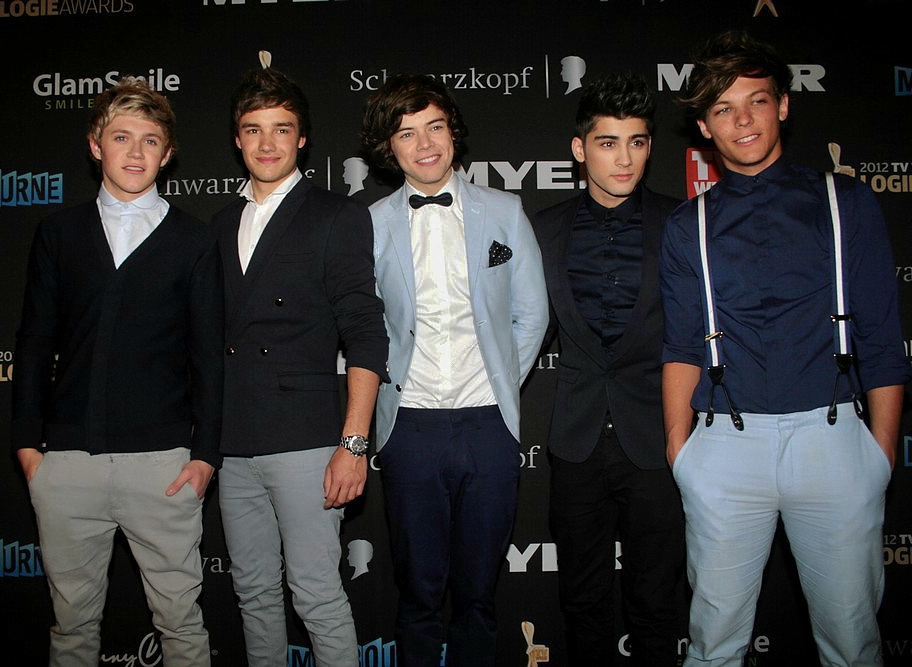
One Direction on the red carpet at the Logie Awards of 2012 in Melbourne, Australia

In September 2012, "Live While We're Young", the lead single from the group's second album, was released and was a global success. It reached the top ten in almost every country it charted in and recorded the highest one-week opening sales figure for a song by a non-US artist in the US. A second single, "Little Things", resulted in the band's second number one single in the UK. In November 2012, One Direction released their second studio album, Take Me Home. The album sold 540,000 copies in its first week in the US, debuted atop the Billboard 200, and topped the charts in more than 34 other countries. Additionally, Up All Night and Take Me Home were the third and fifth best-selling album of the year respectively in the United States. Upon reaching number one on the Billboard 200, the group became the first boy band in US chart history to record two number-one albums in the same calendar year, alongside becoming the first group since 2008 to record two number-one albums in the same year. One Direction became the first group ever to have their first two albums reach atop the Billboard 200.

Take Me Home was written in groups and has an average of just under five songwriters per track. Savan Kotecha, Rami Yacoub, and Carl Falk, who composed One Direction's hits "What Makes You Beautiful" and "One Thing", spent six months in Stockholm developing songs for the album, and were able to shape melodies around their tones. One Direction began recording the album in May 2012, in Stockholm at Kinglet Studios. The album cover artwork features the group surrounding a traditional British K6 red telephone box. Take Me Home garnered generally favourable reviews from music critics. There was praise for its quality of production, although it was criticised for its generic, rushed nature.

One Direction performed "Little Things" at the 2012 Royal Variety Performance in the presence of Queen Elizabeth II, and headlined a sold-out show at New York City's Madison Square Garden on 3 December 2012. In February 2013, One Direction released "One Way or Another (Teenage Kicks)", a cover version of "One Way or Another" and "Teenage Kicks", as the 2013 Comic Relief single. The charity single reached number one in the UK and Ireland, while peaking at 13 in the US. The music video for the charity single was shot in Ghana, where the group volunteered at a children's hospital; Tokyo; New York City; and London, including at 10 Downing Street, featuring a cameo from the then-British prime minister David Cameron. Following the release of Take Me Home, One Direction embarked on their second concert tour and first all-arena tour in February 2013, the Take Me Home Tour. The concert tour consisted of 123 shows in Europe, North America, Asia, and Oceania. Ticket sales reached 300,000 within a day of release in the UK and Ireland, which included a six-date sell-out at the O_{2} Arena in London. The tour grossed $114 million. The Official Charts Company revealed that One Direction had sold 2,425,000 records in the UK by February 2013.

=== 2013–2014: Midnight Memories and This Is Us ===
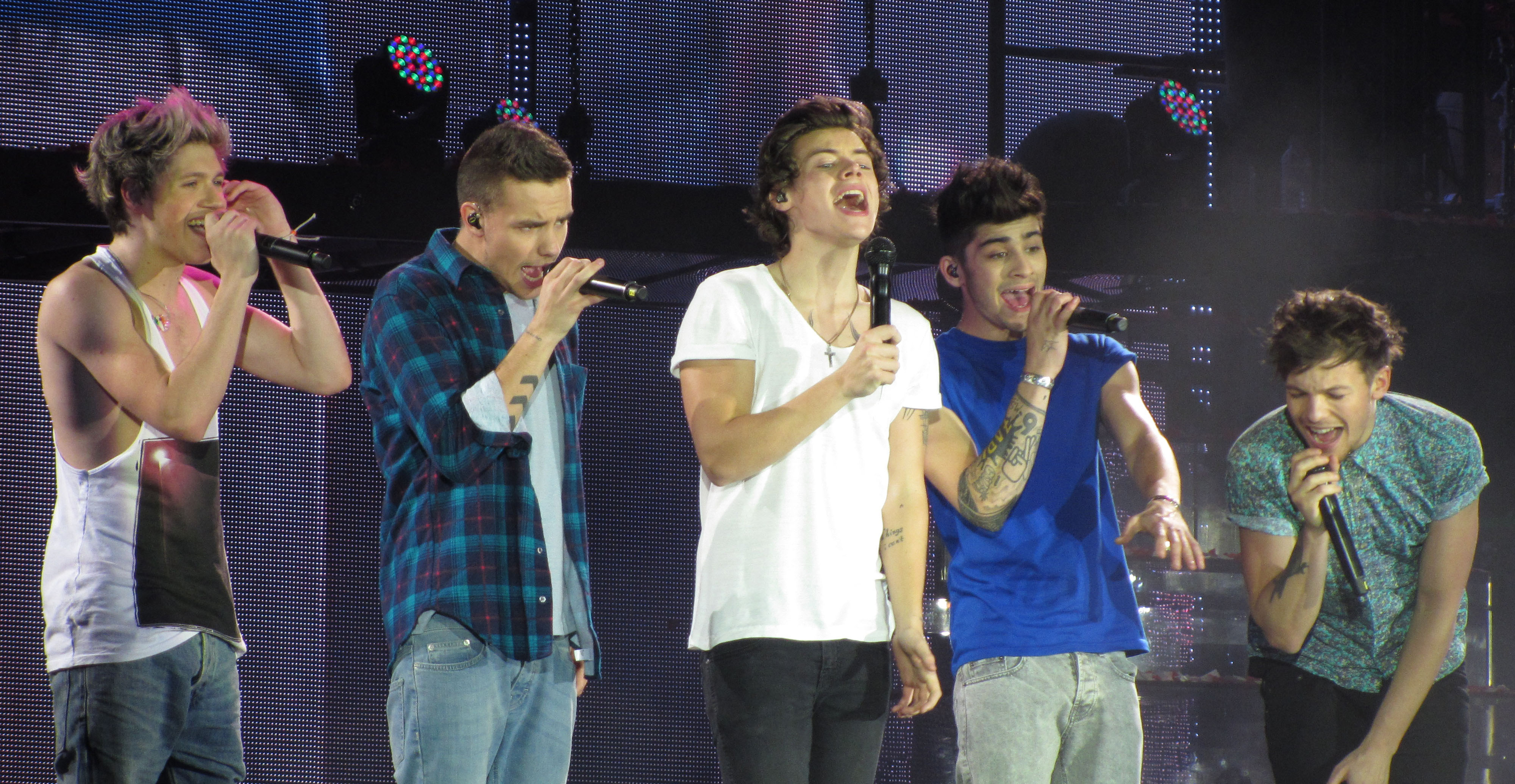
One Direction in Glasgow, Scotland, on their Take Me Home Tour in February 2013

"Best Song Ever", the lead single of the group's then-upcoming third studio album Midnight Memories, was released on 22 July 2013. The song is their highest-charting single in the US to date, reaching number two. It broke the 24-Hour Vevo Record with 10.9 million views on YouTube. One Direction: This Is Us, a 3D documentary and concert film about the group directed by Morgan Spurlock and produced by Spurlock, Ben Winston, Adam Milano and Simon Cowell, was released by TriStar Pictures on 30 August 2013. The film was a box office success, topping the UK and US box offices and grossing over $60 million worldwide, and became the fourth highest-grossing concert movie. In August, the group released their third book, One Direction: Where We Are: Our Band, Our Story: 100% Official.

On 16 May 2013, the band announced their first all-stadium tour, the Where We Are Tour. In support of Midnight Memories, the band participated in "1D Day", a day dedicated to One Direction fans. The day constituted of a 7-hour interactive YouTube live-stream sponsored by Google, featuring live band performances and celebrity guests, including Simon Cowell, Khloe Kardashian, Kelly Rowland, Robbie Williams, Celine Dion, and Piers Morgan. On 28 October 2013, the second single from Midnight Memories, "Story of My Life", was released, charting at number six in the US and at number two in the UK, while charting at number one in countries such as Mexico, Spain, Bulgaria, Denmark, and Ireland.

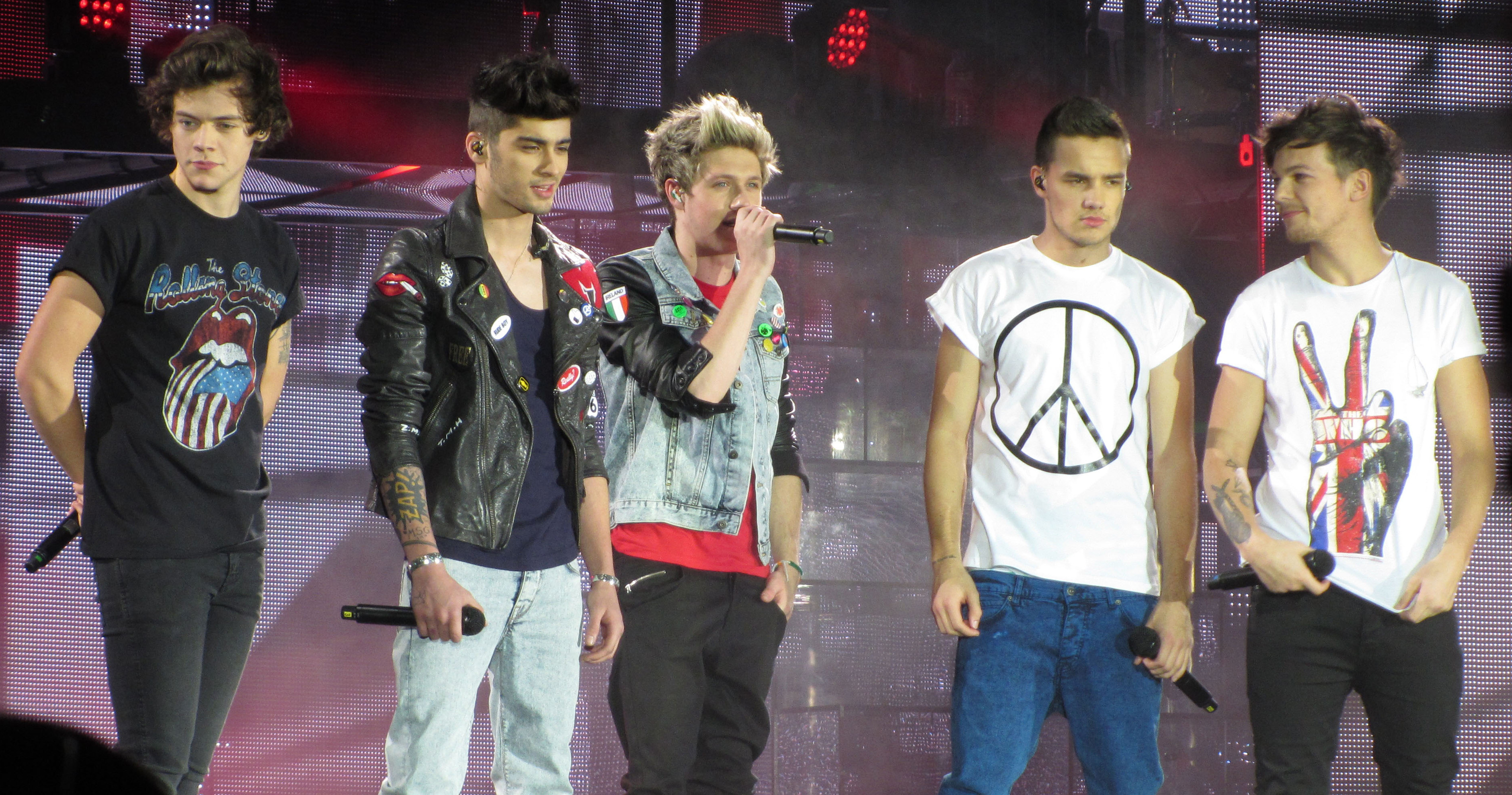
The band performing in Glasgow in February 2013

Midnight Memories was released globally on 25 November 2013. It debuted at number one in the UK and in the US, making them the first group to debut at number one on the Billboard 200 with its first three albums, and the second to reach the top after the Monkees in 1967. The album was described by the band as "edgy" and as having a "slightly rockier tone" than their previous efforts. Despite being released at the year's end, it was the best-selling album worldwide in 2013 with 4 million copies sold globally.

In December 2013, One Direction broke yet another UK sales record with the DVD and Blu-ray release of This Is Us. Nearly 270,000 copies of the film were sold in the UK within three days of its release, beating the record previously set by Michael Jackson's This Is It in 2010 by 10,000 copies. The group were named among the Top Global artists of 2013 by the IFPI because of strong digital downloads, physical albums, on-demand streams, and music videos.

The band embarked on the Where We Are Tour on 25 April 2014, and it was concluded on 5 October 2014. Playing 69 shows, the tour grossed over $290 million, becoming the highest-grossing concert tour in 2014 (grossing $87 million more than the second highest-grossing tour, Justin Timberlake's The 20/20 Experience World Tour), the 15th highest-grossing concert tour of all time, and the highest-grossing tour of all time by a vocal group. The tour was attended by 3.4 million people.

=== 2014–2015: Four and Malik's departure ===
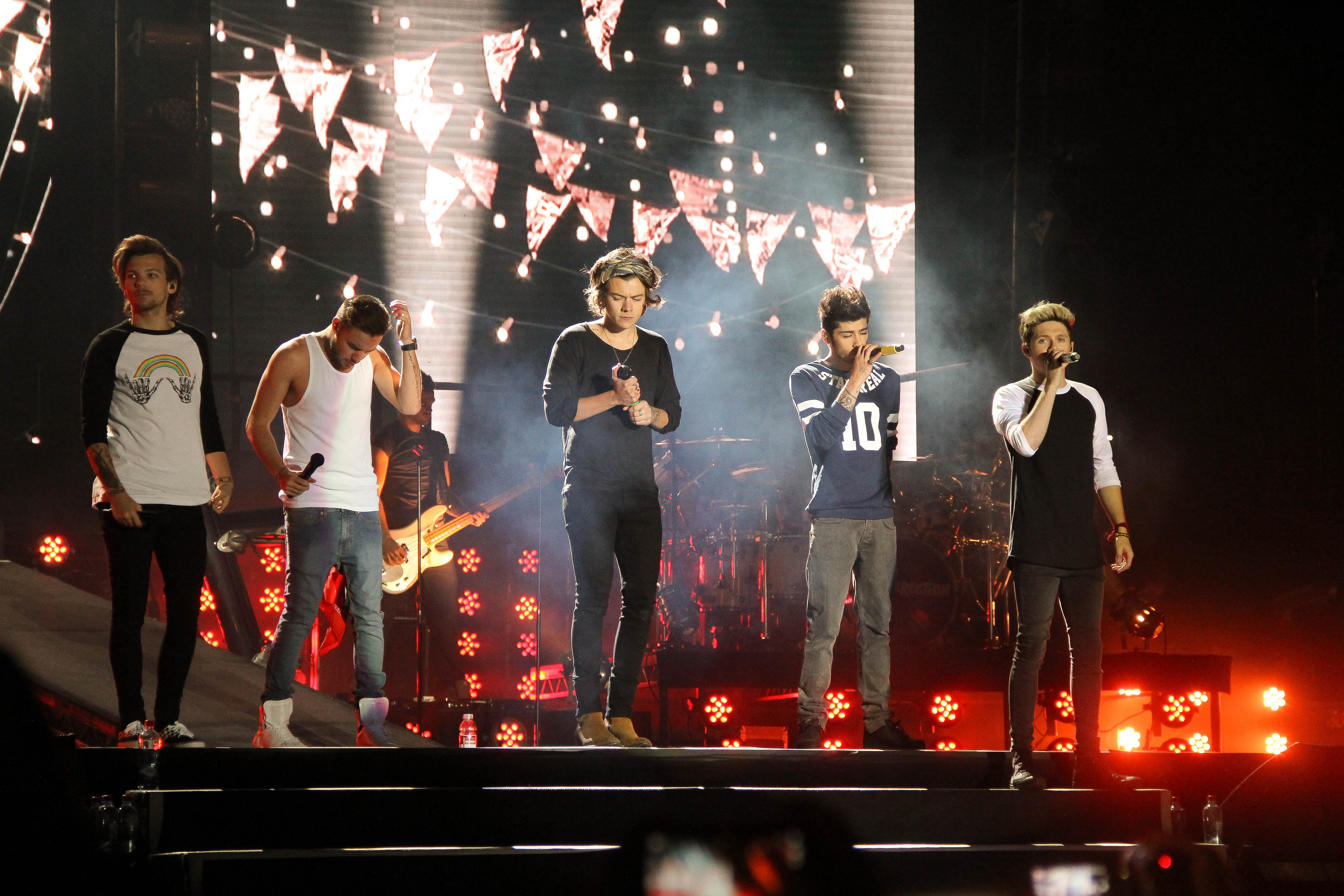
One Direction on stage in Santiago, Chile, during their Where We Are Tour in April 2014

In July 2014, One Direction announced One Direction: Where We Are – The Concert Film, a film which documents the concerts of 28 and 29 June 2014 that took place in San Siro Stadium during their Where We Are Tour. After the announcement, the band announced the film would also have a limited 10–11 October 2014 international cinema release before its home media release in December. The group also released an autobiography titled Who We Are.

On 8 September 2014, One Direction announced their fourth studio album to be titled Four, set to be released on 17 November 2014. As part of the announcement, one of the songs from the album, "Fireproof" was released for free download for 24 hours on their official website. "Steal My Girl", the album's lead single, was released on 29 September 2014, receiving critical acclaim for its classic rock sound. The second single from the album, "Night Changes", was released on 14 November, three days before the album's release. It also achieved platinum status, selling over one million units in the United States. Four was released on 17 November 2014, topping the Billboard 200 and the UK Album Chart. It became the top charted album on iTunes in 67 countries two months before its official release. It was the sixth-bestselling album of 2014 globally, selling 3.2 million copies. One Direction became the only group to have their first four albums debut at number one on the Billboard 200 albums chart following the album release. In February 2015, the group embarked on their fourth world tour and second all-stadium tour, the On the Road Again Tour.

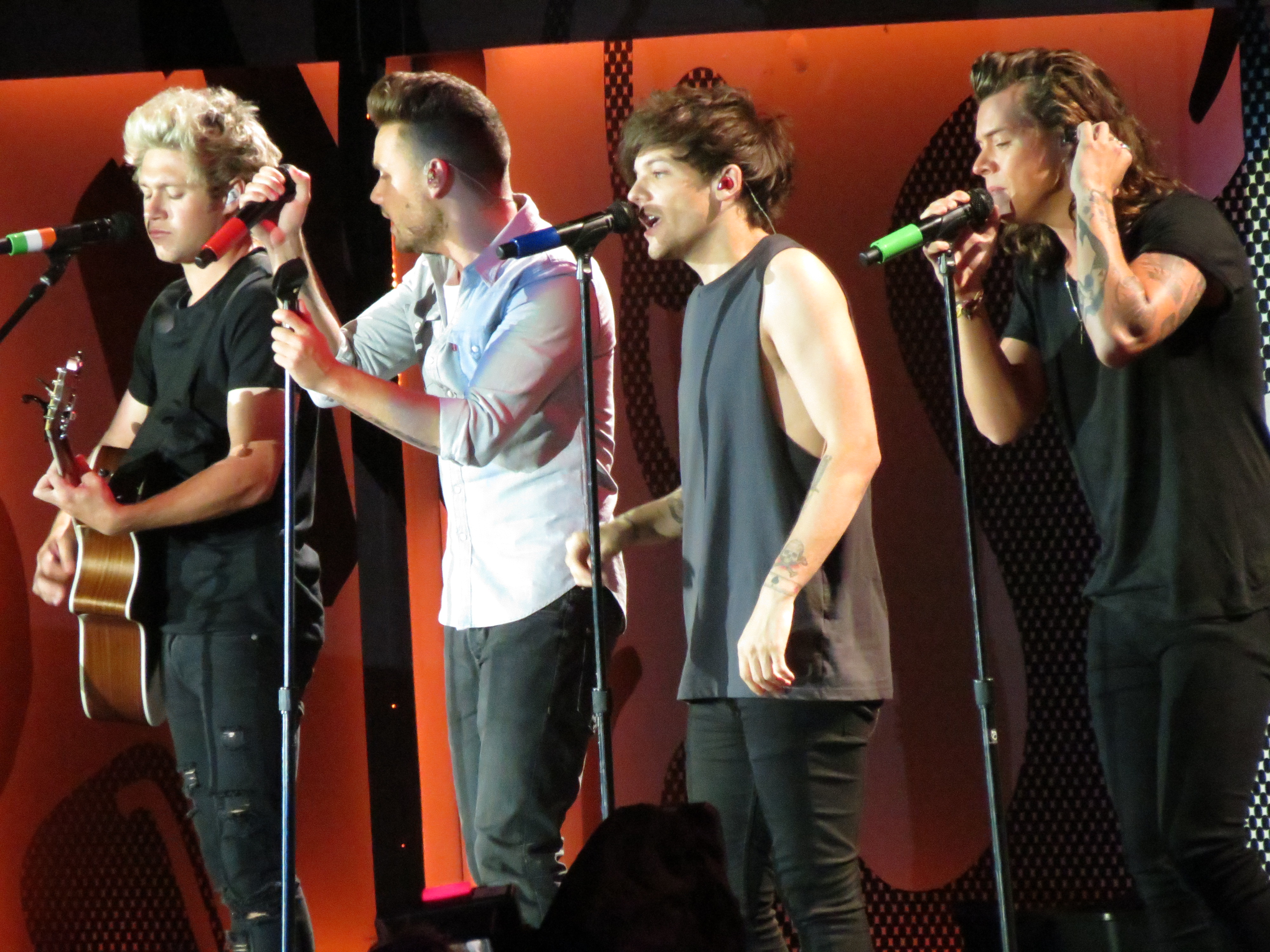
The group performing as a four-piece after Zayn Malik's departure at Soldier Field, Chicago, in August 2015

On 25 March 2015, amid the Asia leg of their tour, the band announced Malik's departure with an official statement. "I'd like to apologise to the fans if I've let anyone down, but I have to do what feels right in my heart", Malik said in the statement. "I am leaving because I want to be a normal 22-year-old who is able to relax and have some private time out of the spotlight. I know I have four friends for life in Louis, Liam, Harry and Niall. I know they will continue to be the best band in the world." In a subsequent interview, Malik denied rumours of a rift between the members and said, "My band has been really supportive". In later interviews, Malik would say he left the group because he was unhappy with its musical direction and his inability to "put any input in". On 14 May, the group made their first official public appearance as a four-piece on The Late Late Show with James Corden, where they confirmed that they would continue working without a new fifth member.

=== 2015: Made in the A.M. ===
On 31 July 2015, the group released "Drag Me Down", the first single from their fifth studio album, Made in the A.M., and the first song released by the group after Malik's departure. The single was released without promotional material or announcement, and topped the charts in multiple countries. It was their first number-one single in France and Australia, number three in the United States, and reached number one in Ireland and the UK, becoming the band's fourth single to do so. The single broke the record of highest first-week streams in the UK, with 2.03 million. In August 2015, the group said that it would go on hiatus in 2016 to work on individual projects, but would remain in the band, planning to work together in the future. On 22 September, Made in the A.M. was officially announced and the promotional single "Infinity" was released. The group began to reveal the track listing on their Snapchat stories. In October, another single, "Perfect", was released. It reached the Billboard top ten, making it the group's second consecutive (after "Drag Me Down") and fifth overall top-ten hit, breaking the Beatles' record for the most top ten Hot 100 debuts among bands.

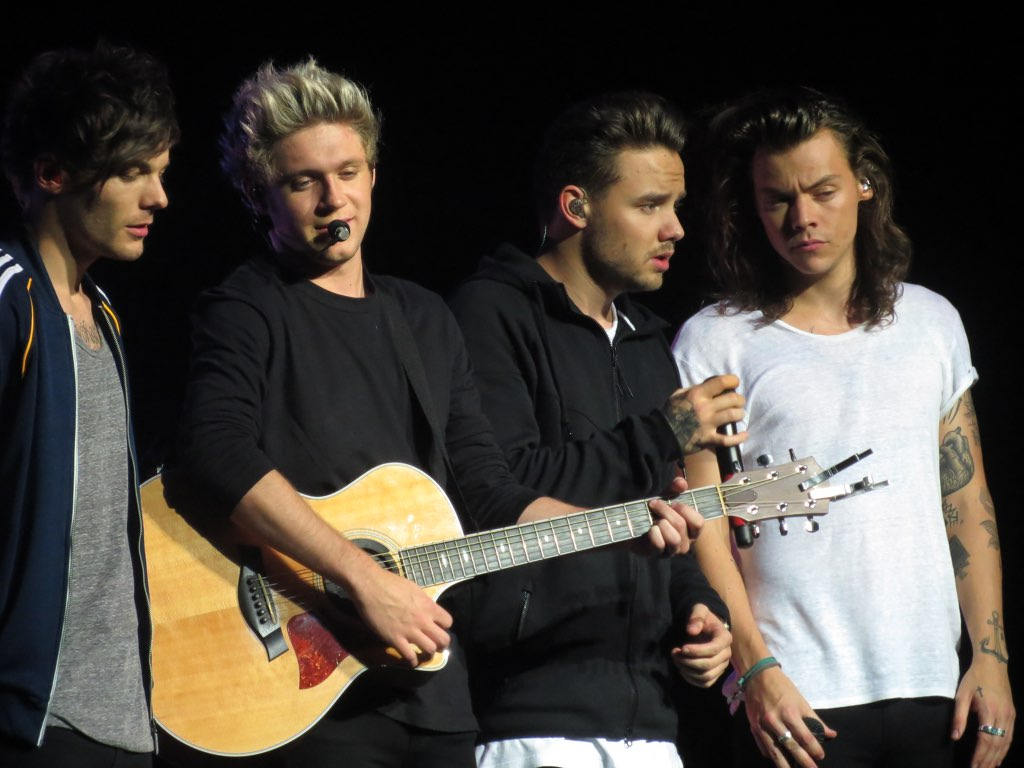
One Direction in Glasgow during one of their last concerts before hiatus on the On the Road Again Tour, in October 2015

The On the Road Again tour concluded on 31 October 2015 after playing 80 shows in stadiums across Australia, Asia, Africa, Europe, and North America. The tour sold more than 2.3 million tickets and grossed $208 million, making it the second highest-grossing tour of 2015. The band released Made in the A.M. on 13 November 2015, topping the charts in the UK and other countries, while reaching number two in the US. The album received positive reviews. Rolling Stone praised the album, highlighting its rock influence and comparing the album to works of classic rock bands such as Fleetwood Mac and The Verve, and other pop boy bands such as Backstreet Boys. The album received general praise for its reflective and mature tone as the band's final project. It was the fastest and the 14th best-selling album of 2015. At the 2015 American Music Awards on 22 November, One Direction won the award for Artist of the Year for the second year in succession. On 13 December, One Direction performed on The X Factor final. Their final televised performance as a group took place on Dick Clark's New Year's Rockin' Eve on 31 December 2015.

=== 2016–present: Hiatus and Payne's death ===
In January 2016, Us Weekly reported that the group's hiatus would become a permanent split, citing unnamed sources that claimed the band had not renewed recording contracts. Representatives for the group denied the report in a statement to Billboard, saying that "nothing has changed regarding hiatus plans for the group, and all will be revealed in due time from the band members' own mouths."

At the 2017 Brit Awards on 22 February, One Direction won the Video of the Year award for their song "History". Payne, the only member in attendance, accepted the award on behalf of the band. By May 2017, all members of the group had released solo singles. Since then, all band members have pursued other projects and released at least one solo album. In February 2018, it was reported that the group had folded its touring company after applying for removal within the Companies House registry in October 2017.

Styles would say in a 2017 interview that he was the first member of the group to bring up the idea of the hiatus in late 2014, saying he "didn't want to exhaust" their fanbase, and that all members later eventually agreed. In 2023, Tomlinson remarked that the split felt like "another loss". Malik stated that the band had gotten "sick" of each other by 2015, contributing to their split. Malik also said that the band was a great experience, but had run its course. In a 2025 interview with The Diary of a CEO, Tomlinson stated "all of a sudden, you get someone thinking more independently and more for themselves, which, by the way, they have every right to do. But the room felt cold that day… I've never quite felt an energy like that in the room" regarding the initial discussion of a hiatus. Tomlinson also discussed the chance of a potential reunion, stating "I can't ever imagine ... I'm not sure it would be right to [Payne]," and "there's no one who would have campaigned more for One Direction to come back than Liam".

On 16 October 2024, Payne died after accidentally falling from a hotel balcony in Buenos Aires, Argentina. At the time of his death, the members of One Direction had not reunited since their hiatus began. Following Payne's death, Malik, Styles, Tomlinson, and Horan released a joint statement paying tribute to him. One Direction's music saw a significant surge on charts around the world soon after, with all five of the group's albums returning to the top 40 of the UK Albums Chart as well as all five charting on the US Billboard 200. Malik and Tomlinson were expected to reunite for a documentary series created by Netflix in 2026; Horan and Styles were not expected to appear. The series would follow their careers since the hiatus and Payne's death. In 2026, it was reported that the series had been cancelled after Malik allegedly punched Tomlinson during filming.

== Artistry ==
"What Makes You Beautiful"
One Direction's debut single, "What Makes You Beautiful", features a prominent guitar-based chorus and riff. It also contains cowbell instrumentation, and the middle eight consists of an "oh na na na" hook. It is among the best-selling singles of all time, selling over 5 million copies.

One Direction's debut studio album, Up All Night (2011), is predominantly a pop music record, containing elements of teen pop, dance-pop, pop rock, with electropop and rock influences. Digital Spy's Robert Copsey described the album as a "collection of PG pop rock with killer choruses", while The New York Times considered it "full of easy rock-inflected pop, blithe and sometimes clever". Jason Lipshutz of Billboard acknowledged that the album demonstrates an originality in sound that was "necessary for the revitalization of the boy band movement". The songs "One Thing" and "What Makes You Beautiful" were particularly noted for the genres of power pop and pop rock, for their "powerhouse" guitar riffs and "forceful" choruses.

Their second album, Take Me Home (2012), is characterised by rock-inherited pop, prominent electric guitar riffs, bright synthesisers, a homogeneous sound and message, and the pitch-correcting software Auto-Tune. Alexis Petridis of The Guardian interpreted its signature sound as a "peppy, synth-bolstered take on early-80s new-wave pop, heavy on clipped rhythms and chugging guitars", which, he said, is at least an improvement on the substitute contemporary R&B "that was once the grim lot of the boy band". Jon Caramanica, writing in The New York Times, considered the album "far more mechanical" than their debut album, although noted that it is sonically and lyrically similar. The album's lyricism speaks of falling in love, unrequited love, the insistence that flaws are what make a person unique, commitment, jealousy and longing for past significant others.

Their third album, Midnight Memories (2013), is a pop rock record, noted as a departure from the band's original teen pop sound by several media outlets. The album was influenced by 80's rock and briefly integrates elements of dubstep, notably in "Little White Lies". The album's lyrical themes primarily revolve around love, heartbreak and sexual intercourse. Many critics praised its lyrical depth and musical composition, as well as the group's level of involvement in the production process.

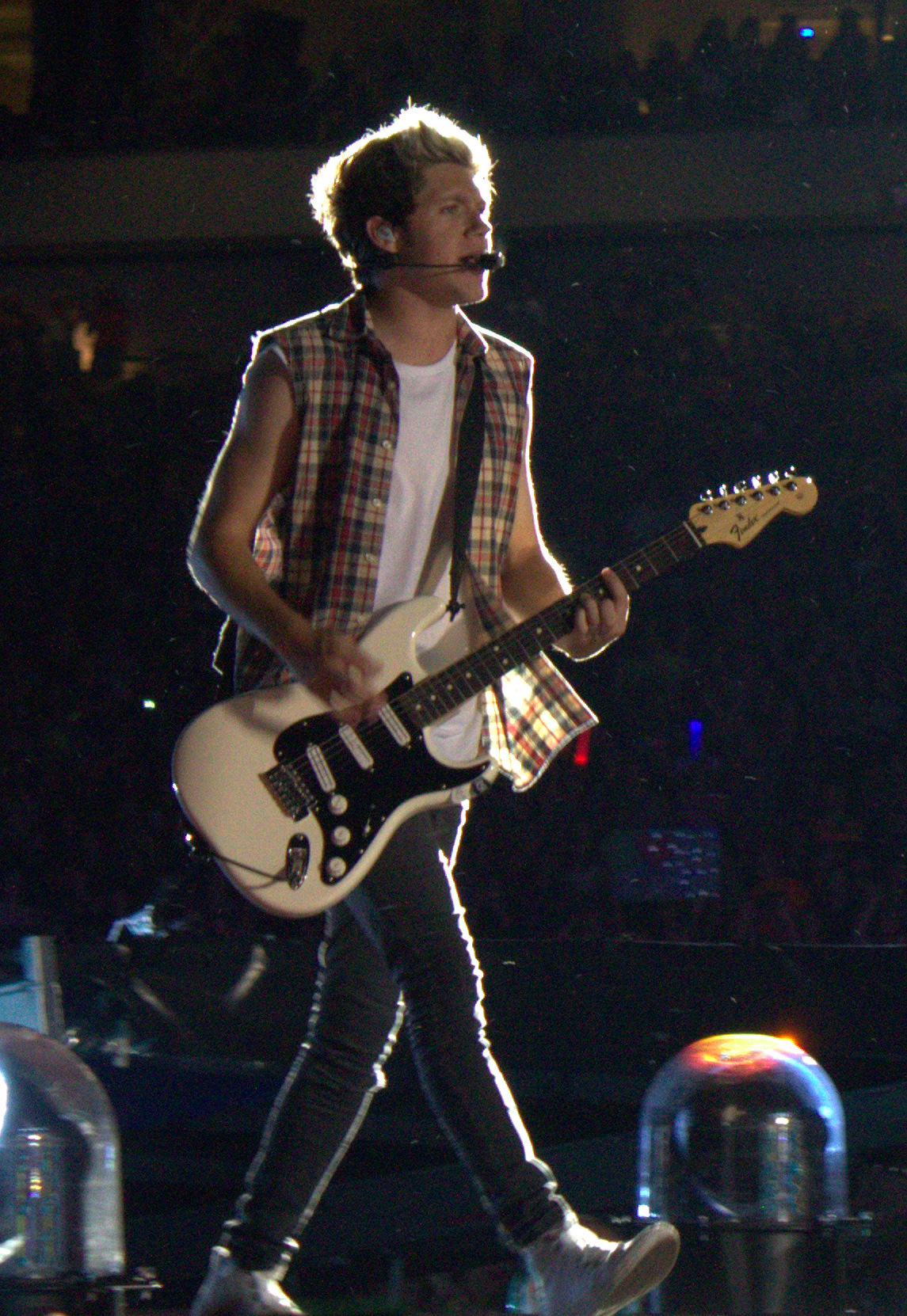
Rolling Stone praised the group's live performances, complimenting member Niall Horan's guitar playing.

Their fourth album, Four (2014), was described as "edgier" by Payne, who said the group had written most of its songs. He also said Horan had suggested the album be named to commemorate their fourth album in the band's four years. Billboard wrote of the album's first single, "Steal My Girl", that it was "no What Makes You Beautiful, but its Coldplay-like piano pop could be a good direction", and that the band were "not entirely ready to let go of its bubble-gum days". Rolling Stone described the record as "saturated with retro vibes", saying that its songs "split the difference between big, splashy Eighties pop rock and more elegant Seventies flavours – a very pesky whipper-snapper move that's not so far from what Haim's hit 'Days Are Gone' did last year".

One Direction's fifth and final album Made in the A.M. was noted as a "slick-sounding" pop record, committing to a reflective mood with more ballads than usual. The album experimented with jazz-fusion, indie, brit-pop, and synth-pop. The album was noted as being sadder than previous ones released by the band, with several songs about failed relationships. The album was praised by Teen Vogue for being intimate and alluding to deeper subject matters, with the publication calling the album a "long love letter to Directioners". The New York Times found influences from the Beatles, Coldplay, and Bee Gees in the album.

Erica Futterman for Rolling Stone favoured their live acoustic performances, praising Horan's guitar playing capabilities and the band's live vocals. Melody Lau of the National Post wrote about the group's appeal, noting that while their fashion style and teen hysteria often took precedence, they demonstrated strong vocal abilities and the ability to entertain. Chris Richards, writing in The Washington Post, dissented from the approval, stating that he believed no one voice stood out, and could not imagine a successful solo act emerging from the band.

== Other ventures ==
=== Endorsements ===
In 2011, One Direction became the face of Pokémon Black and White, starring in a series of television adverts. They were the first installments in the fifth generation of the Pokémon series of role-playing games. They also launched Nokia C3 and Nokia C2-02 phones. In 2012, they collaborated with Colgate to launch a One Direction themed toothpaste and toothbrush line. The band were signed by Pepsi, partnering with NFL player Drew Brees for Pepsi's "Live for Now" campaign. Mini figures based on members of the group were launched for the band's US fans after the agreement was signed by American firm Hasbro. In October, the band signed up to endorse Filipino clothing brand, Penshoppe.

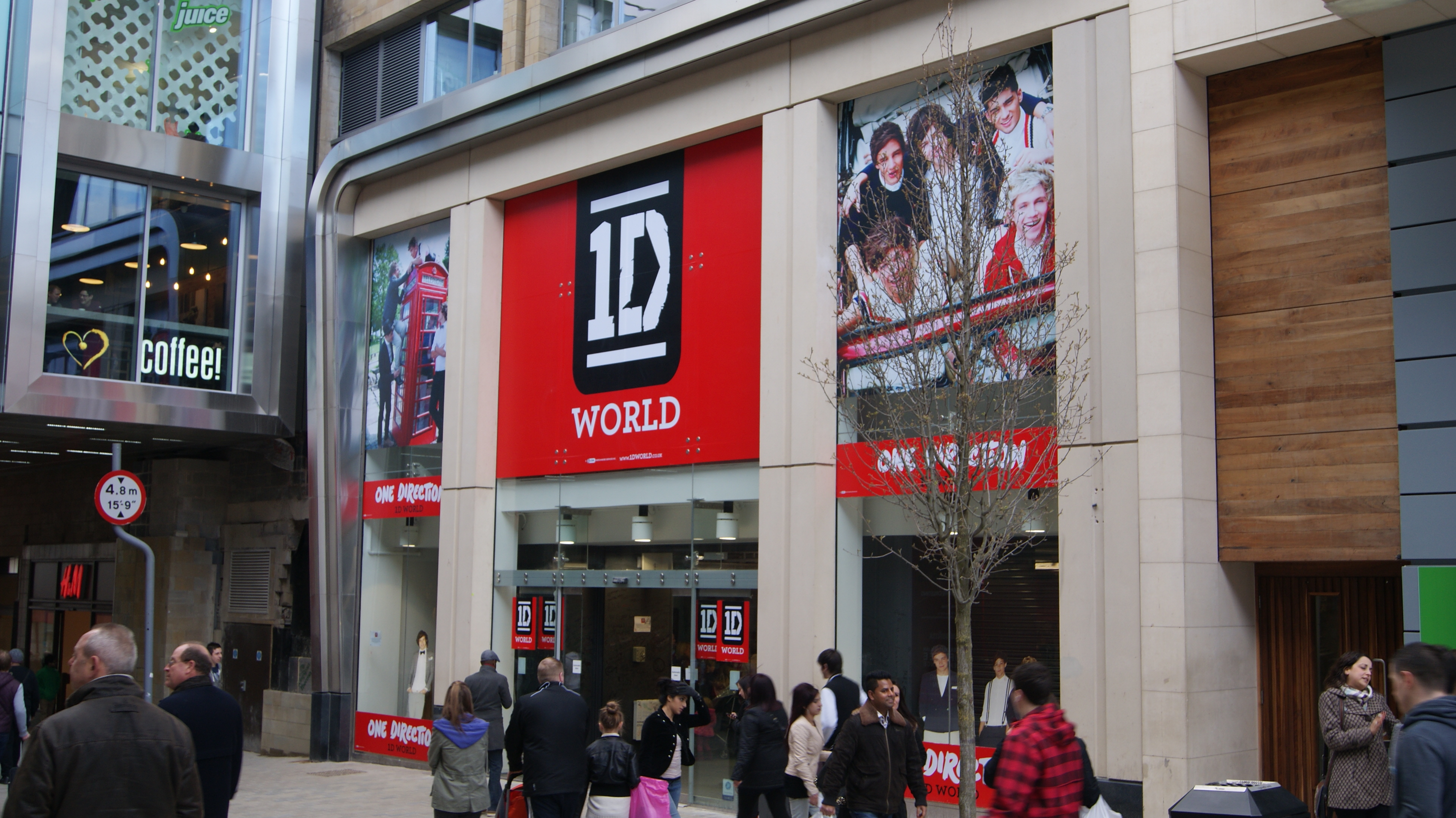
A One Direction merchandising shop in Leeds, Yorkshire, in March 2013

The following year, One Direction announced global "1D World" pop-up shops, including in Brisbane, Toronto, Chicago, New York, Tokyo, and Stockholm, selling exclusive merchandise. Nabisco became the title sponsor of One Direction's North American tour. Later that year, the band partnered with MUA Cosmetics to release "Little Things", a collection of makeup products including lipsticks, inspired by the members' favourite colours. One Direction released their debut fragrance, "Our Moment" around this time, available exclusively at Harrods. The full-length advert for the fragrance featured the song "My Favourite Things". In February 2014, the band released their second scent, "That Moment". The fragrance was released with a matching shower gel and body lotion. They released their third fragrance "You & I" in August, named after their song of the same name.

In 2015, One Direction appeared in an advert for the Toyota Vios, which aired in Thailand. One Direction revealed their fourth fragrance 'Between Us' in June 2015, with the accompanying advertisement paying homage to the music video for "Kiss You". The band appeared in a Honda Civic ad which shows the quartet testing out the car's stereo, style, and trunk space with a humorous tone and the tagline "It's all One Direction approved." The ad is set to the band's single "Drag Me Down". The group's 2015 U.S. tour was also supported by Honda.

=== Philanthropy ===
One Direction engaged in numerous charitable initiatives. In 2011, the band performed on the BBC's Children in Need 2011 charity telethon. In 2012, they extended their involvement with Children in Need as they opened the telecast with a performance of their single "Live While We're Young". A prominent annual event in British television, the group said it was "incredible" to be involved in Children in Need as it was something that they had "always watched as children". That year, Niall Horan organised an event on his birthday to raise money for charities Irish Autism Action and Temporary Emergency Accommodation Mullingar, the latter based in his hometown. Horan hosted the event at Mullingar Park hotel, with tickets selling out in minutes. In February 2013, One Direction released "One Way or Another (Teenage Kicks)" (a medley of "One Way or Another" and "Teenage Kicks") as the 2013 single for the UK's other major charity telethon Comic Relief. The group travelled to various countries in Africa and created short films with the charity, pleading for donations and subsequently raising over £2 million.

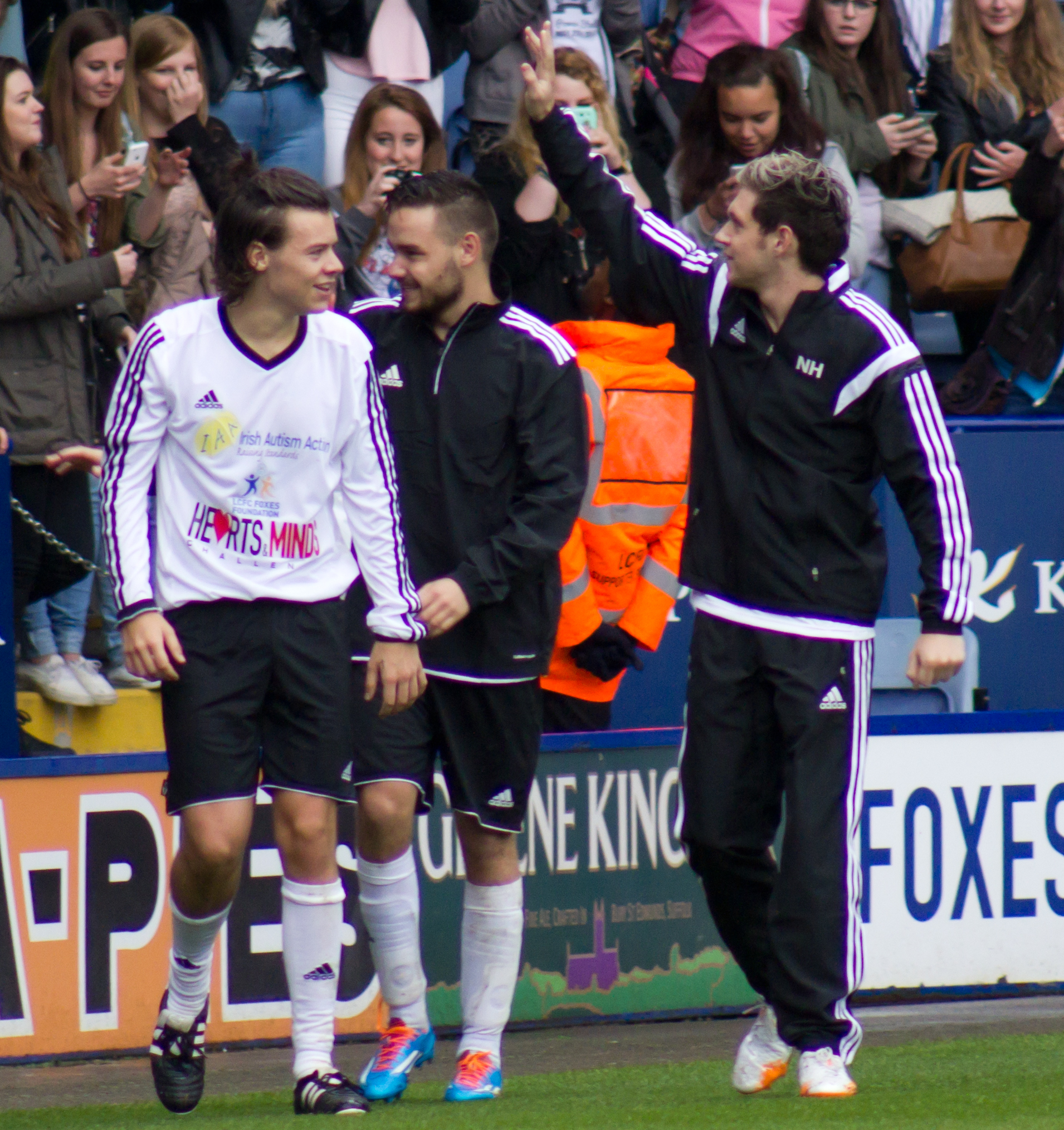
Styles, Payne, and Horan participating in a charity football match in 2014

In 2013, band members Liam Payne and Harry Styles became the ambassadors of Trekstock, a cancer charity, to help raise money for cancer research. The band announced a partnership with Office Depot on a limited-edition capsule collection of back to school supplies in June 2013, and that a portion of the proceeds from the alliance would go toward an anti-bullying educational programme. One Direction were named the most charitable of the year behind Taylor Swift by nonprofit organisation DoSomething. The band frequently supported children's charity Believe in Magic, donating millions of pounds, tweeting their support for the charity, wearing bracelets supporting it onstage during their tours, and attending the charity's events.

In 2014, the band performed at the Royal Variety Performance where they played in front of Prince William and Catherine at the London Palladium. In August, One Direction collaborated with initiative Stand Up To Cancer by offering fans the opportunity to meet them following a £5 donation towards the cause. On 15 November 2014, One Direction joined the charity group Band Aid 30 along with other British and Irish pop acts, recording the latest version of the track "Do They Know It's Christmas?" at Sarm West Studios in Notting Hill, London, to raise money for the 2014 Ebola crisis in Western Africa. Horan hosted a charity football match, where he and members Payne, Styles, and Tomlinson played. The match was also played by Olly Murs, Rod Stewart, and Robbie Fowler. The following year, One Direction launched the "Action 1D" campaign in partnership with Action/2015 to raise awareness of global issues, including poverty, inequality, and climate change. The act was supported by then Democratic presidential candidate Hillary Clinton. The group were supportive of LGBTQ+ rights.

== Legacy ==
=== Significance ===
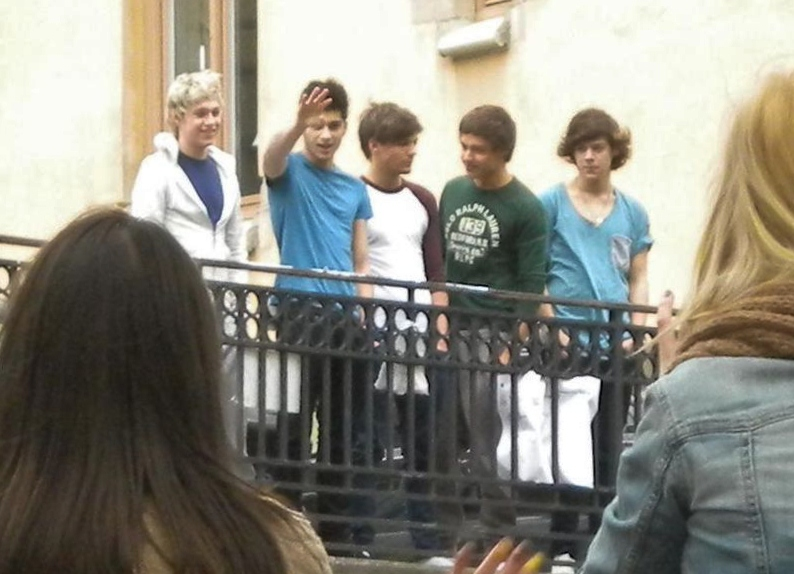
One Direction greet Swedish fans in Stockholm, Sweden, in May 2012.

One Direction is considered the most successful act in The X Factor history and one of the most successful music acts overall in terms of chart performance and sales, and have been described as sparking a resurgence in the interest in boy bands as well as forming part of a new "British Invasion" in the United States, along with acts like Adele. Considered the biggest British group since the Beatles, their popularity and fanaticism surrounding them has often been compared to Beatlemania, (Note: Attributed to several sources.) leading to former Beatles member Paul McCartney warning the band about pressure. One Direction were often dubbed teen idols, (Note: Attributed to several sources.) and were subject to fan hysteria. (Note: Attributed to several sources.) In one instance, Leicester Square was sealed off by police following the premiere of One Direction: This Is Us, where an estimated 70,000 fans were in attendance. Styles claimed in 2014 the band was bigger than the Beatles in terms of fame, although saying One Direction could not compete musically. McCartney disagreed with Styles. The group have appeared on several lists of the best boy bands of all time, best boy band albums, and best boy band songs.

Neil McCormick of The Daily Telegraph attributed One Direction's success in North America to the rise of other pop acts such as Justin Bieber, with him stating that is demonstrated there was still a market for "clean cut, wholesome, whiter-than-white, middle class parent friendly pop". Bill Werde, a representative of Billboard magazine, commented, that the band had a lot of potential for major success prior to their breakthrough. On NPR, Maria Sherman noticed that before One Direction's breakthrough, boy bands were "off the radar" since NSYNC went on an indefinite hiatus in 2002. Many media outlets noted that One Direction were the first boy band to rise to and eventually surpass a level of popularity comparable to NSYNC, Backstreet Boys, and New Kids on the Block at their peaks. HuffPost wrote that "One Direction's level of fame surpassed anything that modern audiences had seen" and that "fans and non-fans alike widely agree that such intense levels of fandom hadn't been seen since the Beatles in the 1960s". NPR described the group as "one of the biggest boy bands the world had ever seen" and the group has been described as "the world's biggest boy band" as recently as 2020, four years since their hiatus. Rolling Stone named "What Makes You Beautiful" the sixth-greatest boy-band song of all time. Billboard named Four the best boy band album of the last thirty years, calling it "the absolute standard-bearer for the last decade of pop". One Direction's music is considered pop rooted in guitar rock. Rolling Stone called the group "one of the great rock bands of the 21st century."

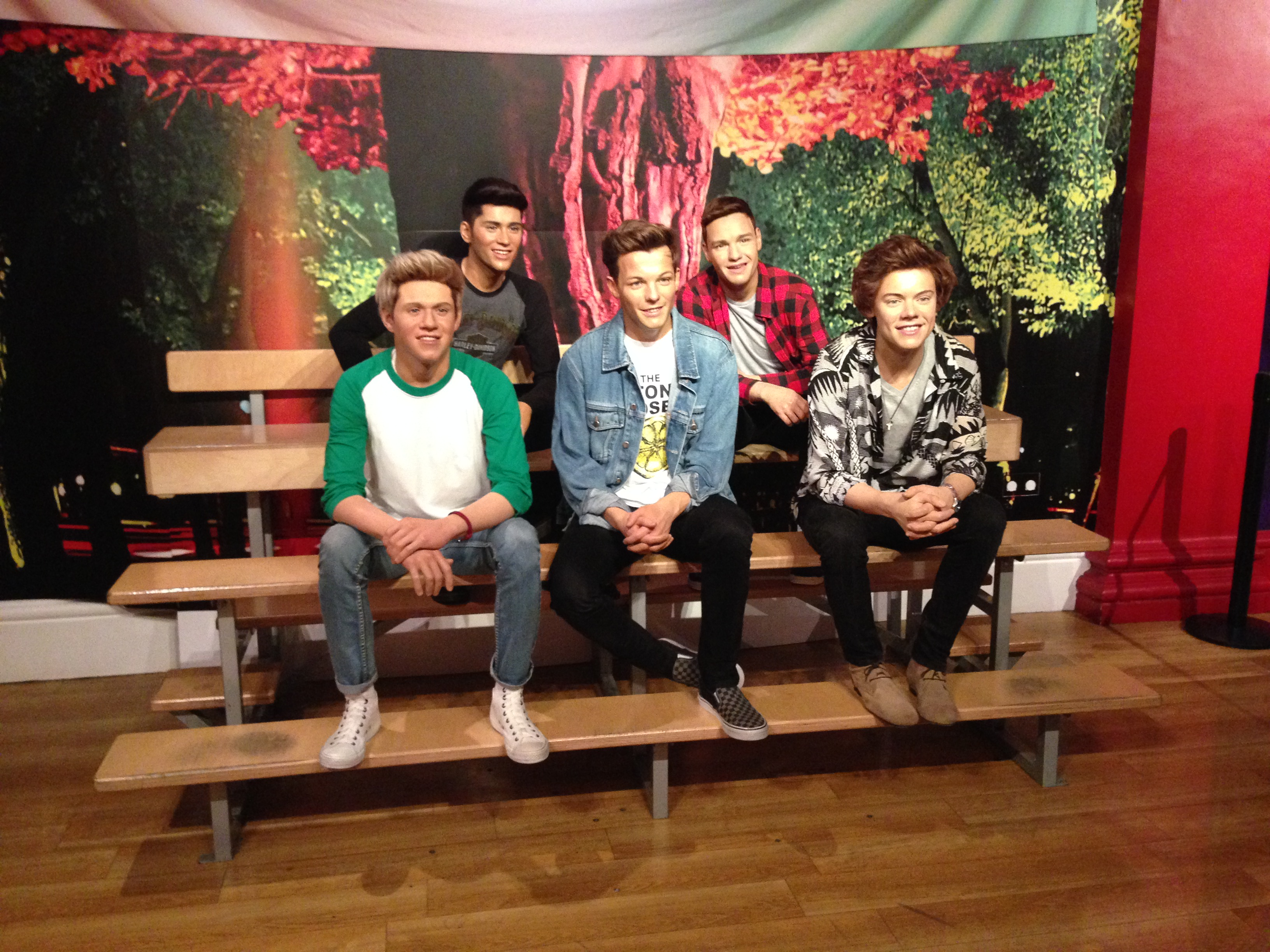
Waxwork of One Direction at Madame Tussauds, London

One Direction were noted by Billboard as "barreling into international success" and falling into "seemingly effortless superstardom". Their main "competitor", in terms of boy bands, was the Wanted, with many expecting a "rivalry" like the one between NSYNC and the Backstreet Boys. However, in a 2014 article by Billboard, they wrote "the boy band war was over before it even began" and that "the boy band war was not a war at all; it had been a one-sided stomping". The Wanted went on indefinite hiatus in 2014, and they cited One Direction's global success as part of the reason, saying, "One Direction are a phenomenon that no one else can compete with" and "for The Wanted to try and compete against one of the biggest bands in the world...it's almost impossible". One Direction's rise to fame has been called "meteoric". The group were the first British band whose debut album topped the US charts.

During their continued rise outside of the United Kingdom and Ireland, the mania surrounding the group was dubbed "One Direction Infection". Part of the group's rise to popularity was their "atypical construct" in the sense that they did not dance, rarely wore matching outfits, and were heavily tattooed, all three of which were rare in boy bands of the past. HuffPost added that they "didn't just sing cheesy ballads" and instead "embraced their differences". Slate noted that One Direction portrayed more of a "joking" and "fun" manner in their songs, music videos, and individual personas when compared to boy bands of the past. Each member of the group was applied a persona: Horan as "the cute Irish one", Malik as "the quiet and mysterious one", Payne as "the sensible one", Styles as "the charming flirt" and Tomlinson as "the funny one".

Madame Tussauds in London made wax sculptures of the band in 2013, retiring them in 2022, six years after the band's indefinite hiatus. In 2017, ABC premiered the television series Boy Band which aims to find male vocalists to become a member of a new five-piece boy band. Many media outlets suspected the show's premise and inspiration was to find "the next One Direction". In 2024, Simon Cowell announced open casting calls for the "next One Direction", stating that he did not believe a boy band had reached the success of the group since the band's conception.

==== Cultural impact ====
One Direction have appeared and been referenced in several pieces of media. The band appeared in a 2012 episode of American teen sitcom iCarly, and inspired an animated cartoon version of themselves as superheroes, styled after the Power Rangers, titled The Adventurous Adventures of One Direction. Jukebox musical Glee covered One Direction's "What Makes You Beautiful" in the episode Prom-asaurus. In 2014, the band appeared on season 45 of the educational children's television series Sesame Street, singing about the letter U in a parody of their song "What Makes You Beautiful". The same year, writer Anna Todd published After, originally a One Direction fan fiction on Wattpad. The band were mentioned in J. K. Rowling's 2015 crime novel Career of Evil, featuring a murdered girl who was obsessed with the group and claimed Niall Horan was her boyfriend.

Comic Relief parodied the band for Red Nose Day 2015, featuring comedians Jack Dee, Nick Helm, Patrick Kielty, Vic Reeves, and Johnny Vegas as "No Direction". The band were featured in 2016 episode "Run, Chris, Run" on Family Guy, with Tomlinson and Payne providing voices for themselves. In 2019, American teen drama Euphoria featured a character writing One Direction fan fictions online, and had an animated sex scene between Styles and Tomlinson. Tomlinson did not approve of the scene. Boy band "August Moon" featured in The Idea of You drew comparisons to One Direction, with lead actor Nicholas Galitzine commenting that One Direction was a reference.

=== Fandom ===
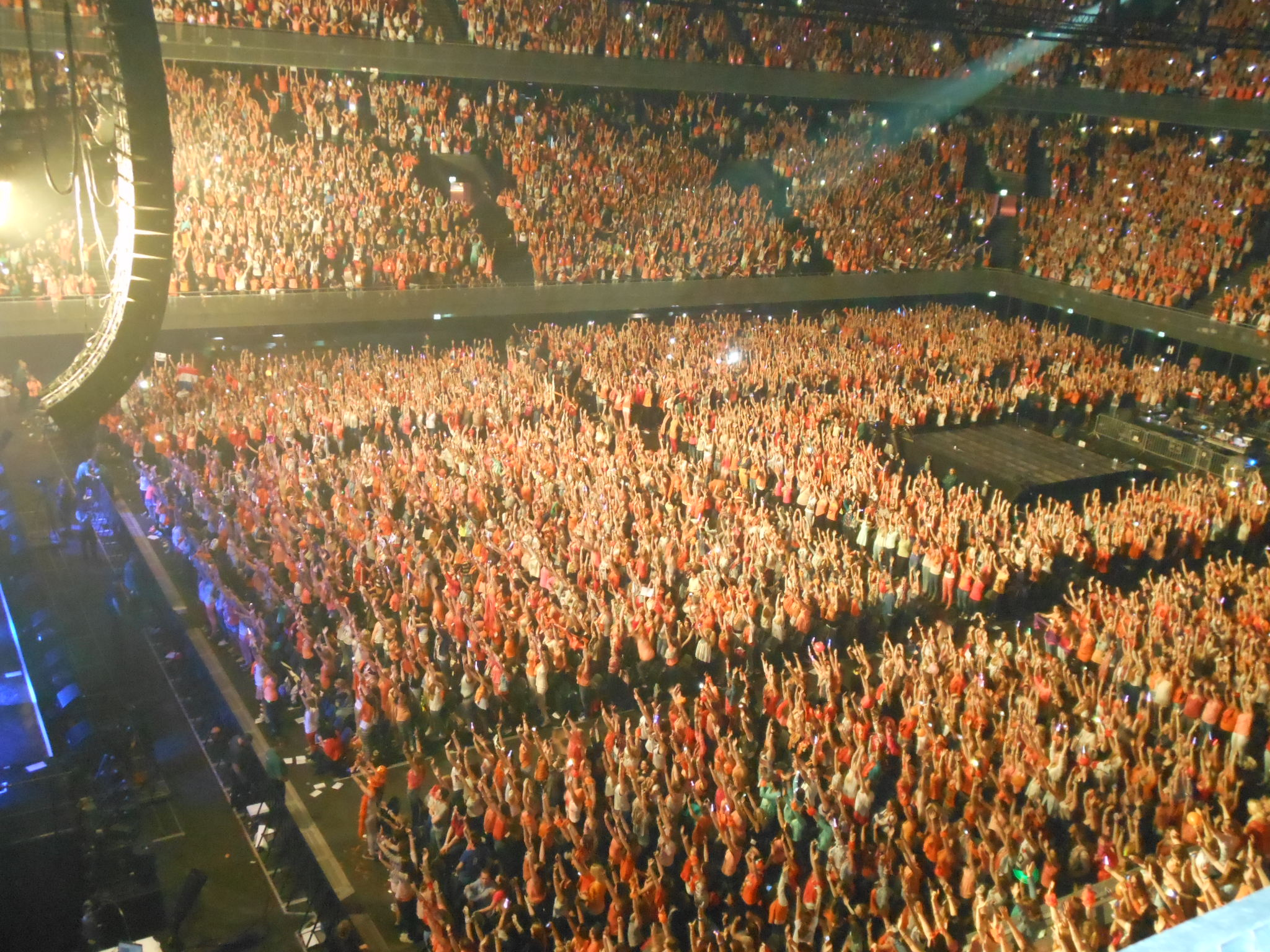
Fans at One Direction's concert in the Ziggo Dome in 2013

One Direction's fans dubbed themselves as "Directioners", and were considered one of the largest fandoms on the internet. HuffPost noted the fandom as "making news for forming unprecedented mobs outside hotels, at airports and outside concert venues. For years, the boys would discreetly exit buildings to remain safe". One Direction were notable for having real person fiction written about them on websites such as Wattpad, with some works exceeding 100 million views on the site. The band was the most popular topic on the site in terms of views and comments. A 2016 study found that a quarter of Wattpad's 150 most popular authors wrote One Direction fan fiction.

The fandom were particularly active on microblogging site Tumblr. In 2015, One Direction were the site's second most reblogged band, and "Larry Stylinson", the name referring to a theory that Styles and Tomlinson were in a romantic relationship, was the most reblogged ship. A year after the hiatus, One Direction were the third most blogged fan fiction topic and band. In 2020, the group were Tumblr's fifth most popular band. The One Direction fandom is credited for popularising an internet meme that involved digitally adding flower crowns to images of celebrities. The Independent wrote that "the legacy of One Direction isn't anything to do with the 1D boys or Simon Cowell, but the extraordinary power of teenage girls" while calling them "sole engineers of the band's unbelievable success" and "alchemists". In 2013, members of the fandom started the organisation Rainbow Direction, aimed at promoting inclusivity for LGBTQ+ fans at the band's concerts.

The fandom has often been discussed negatively in the media, with Julia Jameson writing that fans were often depicted as "an unprecedented sort of fans more extreme than others". British documentary Crazy About One Direction (2013) focused on fans labelled "the craziest", such as those wishing harm on band member's partners. The documentary received intense backlash from the fandom, believing the portrayal was inaccurate. A 2022 article by Fast Company wrote that "One Direction fangirls made the internet a better place", and credited the group for shaping modern social media interactions between fandoms. In a 2020 story in honour of the band's 10-year anniversary, Billboard wrote that their "groundbreaking success" was in part due to the group's dedicated global fanbase, and accelerated by the rise of social media and online music streaming, and rivalling any other boy band fandom in history. After Malik left the band in March 2015, fan reactions went viral on social media. Candlelight vigils held in memory of Malik went viral, with sites like Rolling Stone writing articles about fan reactions. Madame Tussauds in London hired "tissue attendants" to comfort guests visiting wax sculptures of the band following Malik's departure.

One Direction were prominently featured in Maria Sherman's 2020 book Larger Than Life: A History of Boy Bands from NKOTB to BTS. In 2022, Kaitlyn Tiffany released a book titled Everything I Need I Get from You: How Fangirls Created the Internet as We Know It, focusing on the cultural impact and online community created by Directioners.

==== Larries ====
Larries are a subsection of the One Direction fandom who believe in "Larry Stylinson", a portmanteau of Louis Tomlinson and Harry Styles. It is a conspiracy theory that the pair are or were in a romantic relationship. Larries have been one of the largest groups of the One Direction fandom since the band's conception, contributing to a 2011 tweet by Tomlinson to Styles becoming one of the most-retweeted tweets on Twitter, peaking as the second-most retweeted tweet of all time.

=== Sales and tour records ===
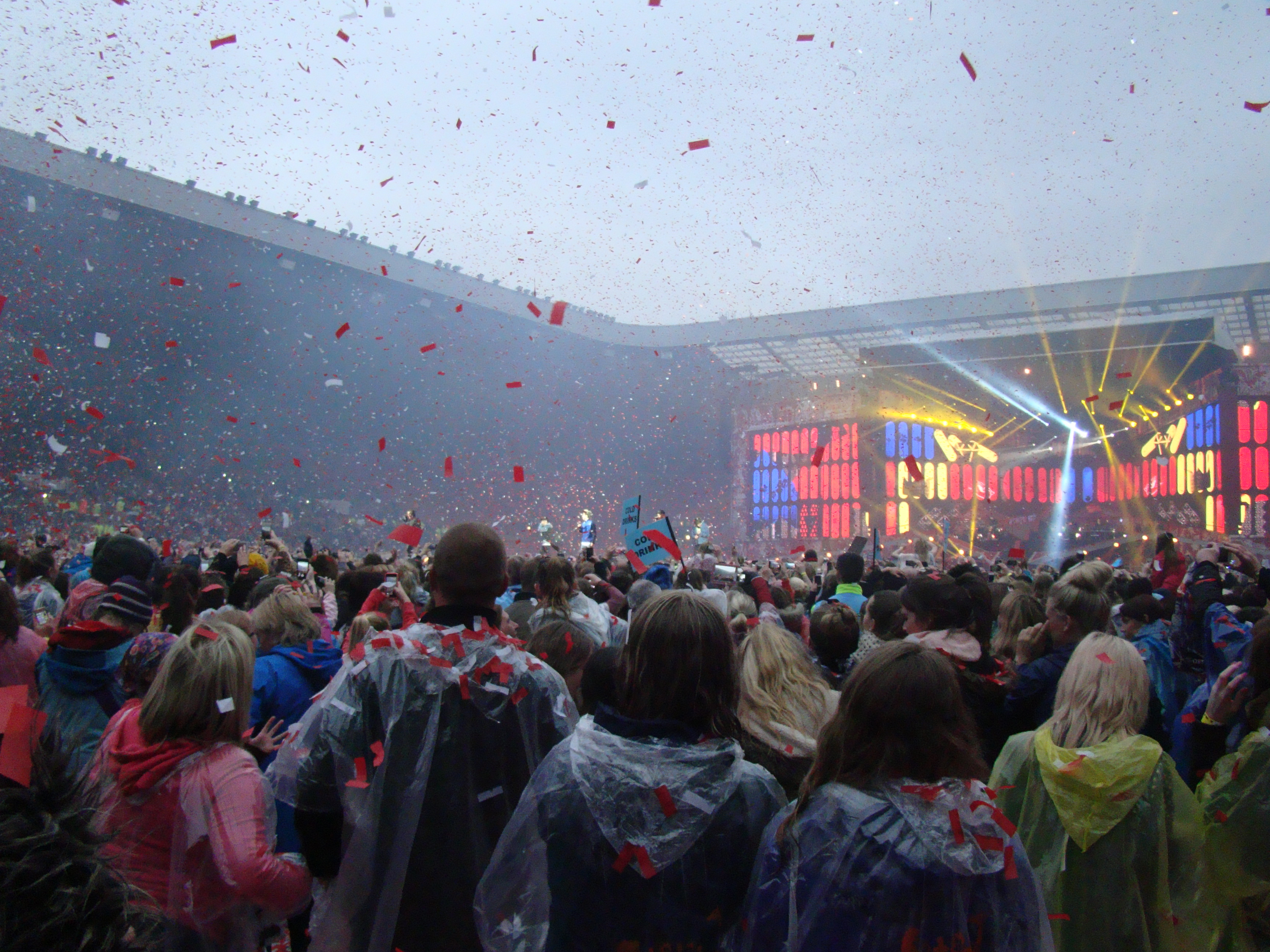
One Direction's "Where We Are Tour" (concert in Sunderland pictured) became the highest-grossing concert tour of 2014.

One Direction have broken numerous records, including sales, charts, and streaming records, earning six Guinness World Records through their successes and becoming one of the best-selling boy bands of all time. The band is reportedly worth over $1 billion through merchandise, album, and tour sales. The band became the first British act to enter the Billboard 200 at number one. The highest entry for such an act was previously held by the Beatles for Introducing... The Beatles. The group were named the Global Recording Artists of 2013 by the International Federation of the Phonographic Industry, being the artist with the most music downloads, CD sales, and streams of that year. They became the first and only group to have their first three album top the Billboard 200 in their opening week, and the third pop group to sell more than 500,000 copies in a week in the Nielsen SoundScan era, previously only achieved by NSYNC and the Backstreet Boys. The same year, the group broke the record for most views on Vevo in 24 hours. In 2014, they became the first band in history to have their first four albums debut atop the chart. The band's "Where We Are Tour" became the highest-grossing concert tour of the year, grossing $290 million in ticket sales. In 2015, the band beat the Beatles' record as they achieved their fifth Top 10 debut on the Billboard Hot 100. In 2015, the band earned the highest first-week streams for a single in the United Kingdom with "Drag Me Down". The group had six top 10 songs on the Billboard Hot 100. One Direction tied with the Beatles with three members from each group having achieved number-one solo albums in 2017. The band were the highest paid European celebrities in 2016, despite having been on hiatus for a year.

=== Social media influence ===
One Direction's rise to stardom has often been attributed to the advancement of the internet and social media, being referred to as "the internet's first boy band". Sonny Takhar, the former president of Syco Records, attributed the breakthrough to social media. Will Bloomfield, the group's manager, added, "These guys live online, and so do their fans." Each member of the band used Twitter to communicate with fans, fostering a relationship with them. Sunil Singhvi, former Twitter head of entertainment in the UK, stated that fans online were the reason the group became a global phenomenon." Savan Kotecha, who wrote multiple songs for the band, said in an interview with Rolling Stone that "[One Direction] just knew how to speak to their fans", and praised them for being authentic. One Direction, in their active years, were present on social media and interacted with fans daily, giving them "an army of online fans". The Detroit News named them "the first megastar boy band of the Social Media Era."

== Recognition ==
As of 2020, One Direction had sold a total of 70 million records worldwide, making them one of the best-selling boy bands of all time. Forbes ranked them as the fourth highest-earning celebrities in the world in 2015, and the highest-earning celebrities under the age of 30.

The band has received seven Brit Awards, seven American Music Awards, six Billboard Music Awards, five Billboard Touring Awards, and four MTV Video Music Awards, among other awards. One Direction holds the record as the most awarded act at the Teen Choice Awards with 28 wins from 31 nominations. Being the world's best-selling artist of 2013, the International Federation of the Phonographic Industry (IFPI) named them the Global Recording Artist of the Year. In 2014, Billboard named the band the Artist of the Year.

== Band members ==
- Niall Horan – vocals, guitar (2010–2016)
- Zayn Malik – vocals (2010–2015)
- Liam Payne – vocals (2010–2016; died 2024)
- Harry Styles – vocals, guitar (2010–2016)
- Louis Tomlinson – vocals (2010–2016)

== Discography ==
- Up All Night (2011)
- Take Me Home (2012)
- Midnight Memories (2013)
- Four (2014)
- Made in the A.M. (2015)

== Filmography ==
Year	Title	Role	Notes	Ref.
2010	The X Factor	Themselves	Contestants: Series 7	
2011	One Direction: A Year in the Making	Themselves	ITV2 Documentary	
2012	iCarly	Themselves	Episode: "iGo One Direction"	
2012	Up All Night: The Live Tour	Themselves	Video album	
2012–2014	Saturday Night Live	Themselves	Musical guests: S37 E18, S39 E8, S40 E10	
2013	One Direction: This Is Us	Themselves	Documentary concert film	
2014	One Direction: Where We Are – The Concert Film	Themselves	Concert film	
2014	One Direction: The TV Special	Themselves	NBC special	
2015	One Direction: The London Session	Themselves	Apple Music series	

== Tours ==
Headlining

- Up All Night Tour (2011–2012)
- Take Me Home Tour (2013)
- Where We Are Tour (2014)
- On the Road Again Tour (2015)

Opening act

- X Factor Tour 2011 (2011)
- Better with U Tour (Big Time Rush) (2012)

== Publications ==
- One Direction: Forever Young, HarperCollins (17 February 2011) ISBN 978-0-00-743230-1
- One Direction: The Official Annual 2012, HarperCollins (1 September 2011) ISBN 978-0-00-743625-5
- Dare to Dream: Life as One Direction, HarperCollins (15 September 2011) ISBN 978-0-00-744439-7
- One Direction: Where We Are: Our Band, Our Story: 100% Official, HarperCollins (19 November 2013) ISBN 978-0-00-748900-8
- One Direction: Who We Are: Our Official Autobiography, HarperCollins (25 September 2014) ISBN 978-0-00-757731-6

== See also ==
- List of Billboard Social 50 number-one artists
- List of artists who reached number one on the UK Singles Chart
