= Crazy About One Direction =

2013 documentary film

- A still from the documentary depicting a fan, Natasha, in her bedroom
- Directed by: Daisy Asquith
- Distributed by: Channel 4
- Release date: 15 August 2013
- Country: United Kingdom
- Language: English

Crazy About One Direction is a 2013 British made-for-television documentary film directed by Daisy Asquith and distributed by Channel 4 exploring the relationship between English-Irish boy band One Direction and their fans, called Directioners.

Produced during a time of extensive media coverage on Directioners, the documentary consisted of interviews with fans and explored the fandom, including Larries, conspiracy theorists who believed band members Harry Styles and Louis Tomlinson were in a relationship. It received mixed reviews from critics, and significant backlash from Directioners. Following its release, Channel 4 and Asquith received bomb and death threats from Directioners who claimed the portrayal was inaccurate.

== Synopsis ==
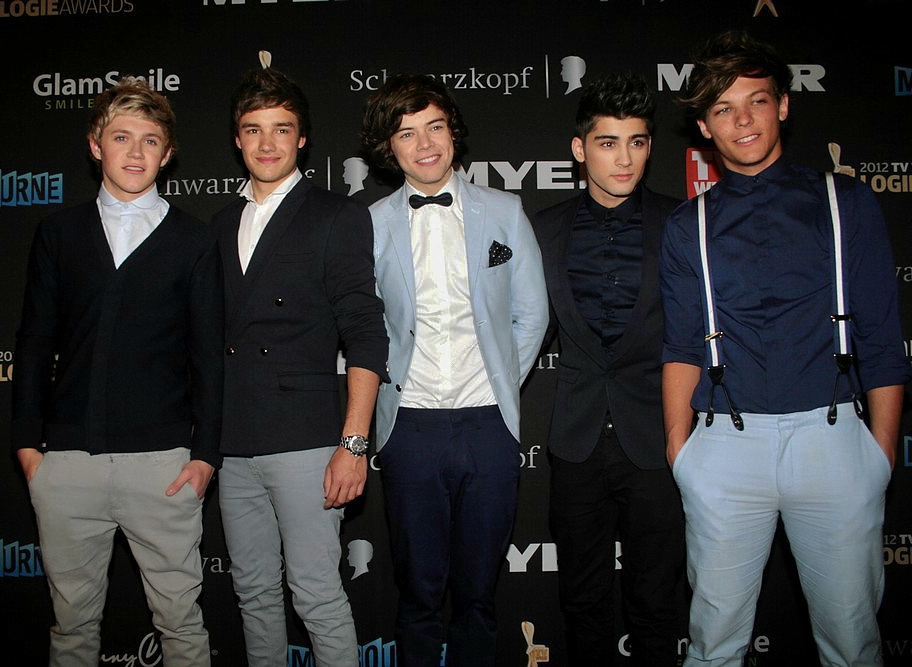
One Direction on the red carpet at the Logie Awards of 2012 in Melbourne, Australia

The film follows groups of One Direction fans, known as Directioners, on the Take Me Home Tour. They express their devotion to the band through fan art, social media, public gatherings, and emotional declarations. Interviews are conducted with the fans, all female teenagers, while waiting for concerts, in their bedrooms, and in hotel rooms. The documentary covers the social media presence of Directioners, specifically on Twitter, Directioner's "loyalty" to the band, and the Larry Stylinson conspiracy theory.

== Production and release ==
The film was commissioned during a time of extensive media coverage of One Direction's fans and the fandom's behaviour. The film was directed by Daisy Asquith and produced and distributed by Channel 4. In order to prepare for the shoot, Asquith followed One Direction themed hashtags on YouTube and Twitter and waited at the back gates of arenas for hours. The documentary began shooting at Manchester Arena in April 2013, where 500 people waited for a One Direction concert. On the last day of editing, the film's title was changed from I Heart One Direction to Crazy About One Direction. Asquith admitted she preferred the former title, and that the new one could "stigmatise" if taken at face value. The film premiered on 15 August 2013, on Channel 4 at 10 PM.

== Reception ==
=== Critical response ===
Sam Wollaston for The Guardian described the film as "sensitive and gentle" in its portrayal of the fandom. Wollaston also compared the fans featured in the documentary to the song "Stan" by the American rapper Eminem, a reference to the song's narrative of an obsessive fan killing himself and his pregnant girlfriend when his idol fails to respond to him. Tom Rowley for The Daily Telegraph gave the film 2 out of 5 stars, criticising its interviews with teenage fans for lacking insight. Rowley remarked that interviews with the most "obsessive" fans were the most interesting and criticised the film for failing to explore those aspects of the fandom, such as a brief scene of a fan threatening to commit suicide if the band did not respond to her. Rowley also questioned the film's claim that it depicted a "new breed of fan", comparing the fan hysteria to Beatlemania which occurred over fifty years prior to the documentary's release. Andrew Billen for The Times noted that while the film aimed to highlight the unsettling intimacy between fans and stars via social media, the most extreme fans appeared harmless, fantasising innocently and behaving with group solidarity. Billen also criticised Asquith's interviews. Simon Usborne for The Independent described the film as "assaulting to the ears". The Atlantic described the documentary as characterising Directioners as "borderline stalkers".

The documentary was the subject of the chapter "A new breed of fan?: Regimes of truth, One Direction fans and representations of enfreakment" by William Proctor, associate professor in popular culture, in the book Seeing Fans: Representations of Fandom in Media and Popular Culture. Proctor criticised the portrayal of fans, believing the documentary stereotyped Directioners as "non-normative" and claimed those seen in the documentary were treated as "an entertainment spectacle" and seen through a "predatory camera". Proctor also criticised the documentary's claim that Directioners were a "new breed of fan", noting that fan hysteria of similar levels have existed before the band, such as Beatlemania.

=== Fandom ===
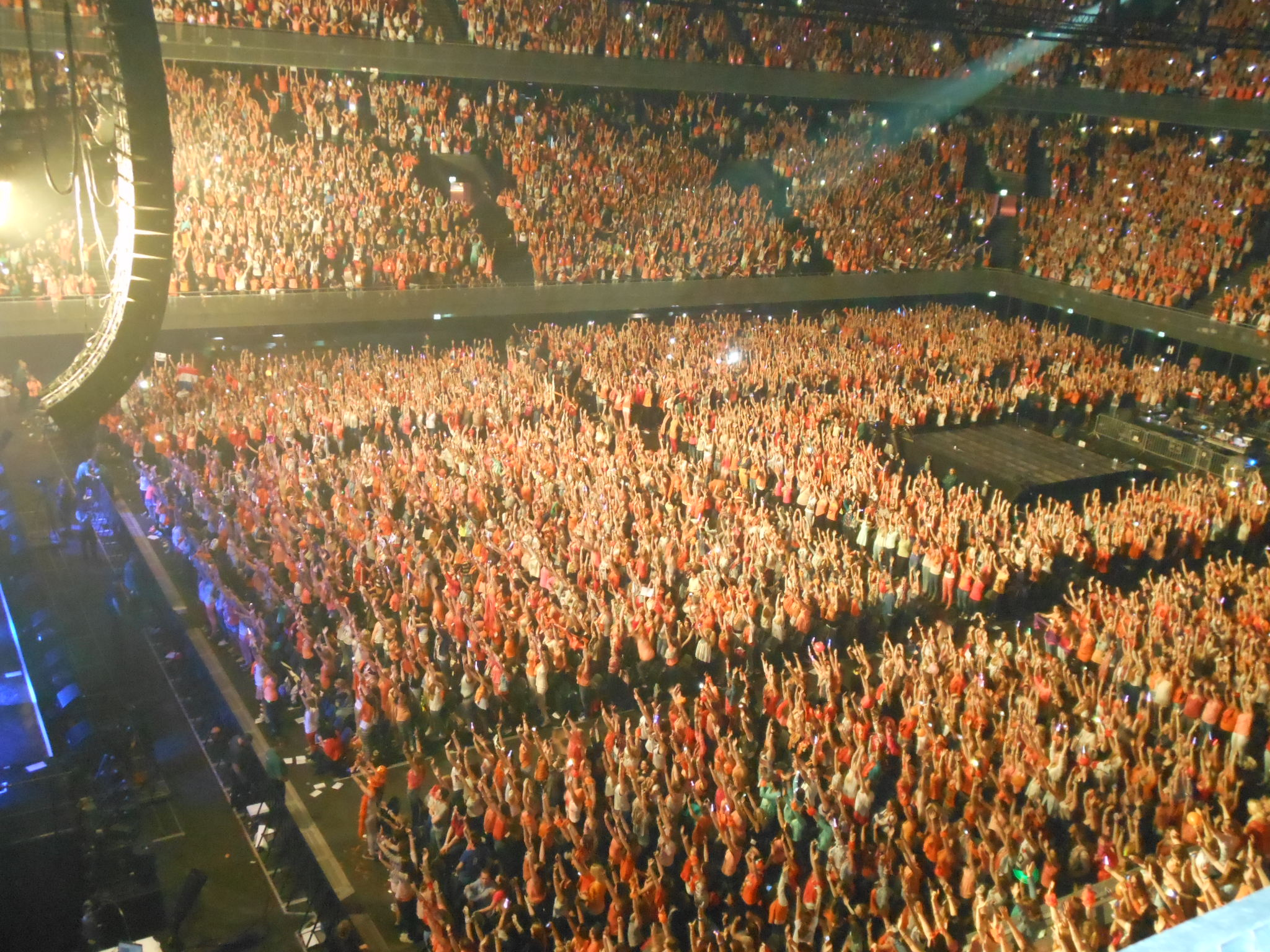
Fans at One Direction's concert in the Ziggo Dome in 2013

Immediately following the premiere, the documentary was met with extreme backlash from the One Direction fandom. Journalist Hannah Ewens, in her book Fangirls: Scenes From Modern Music Culture, described the collective fandom response as "one of the largest, most far-reaching and dramatic responses to the media in fan history". According to academic Julia Jameson, Directioners believed they were misrepresented in the documentary, claiming it inaccurately depicted the majority of the fandom's practices. This led to #THISISNOTUS becoming a top trend on Twitter, a reference to the title of One Direction's then upcoming film, One Direction: This Is Us. Fans also believed the documentary exploited its interview subjects. In addition, Directioners' "rival" fandom, Beliebers, voiced support for the band using the hashtag "BeliebersareHereforDirectioners".

Channel 4 experienced thousands of bomb threats, and Asquith faced death threats. The film faced backlash from Directioners for addressing Larries, a subsection of the fandom who are conspiracy theorists that believe One Direction band members Harry Styles and Louis Tomlinson are or were in a secret romantic relationship. The documentary led to an increased amount of hate against Larries, as well as encouragement for them to commit suicide. The hashtag #RIPLarryShippers trended on Twitter after the premiere, falsely claiming that 42 Larries committed suicide as a result of the documentary including their homoerotic Larry fan art.

=== One Direction ===
Band member Liam Payne reacted to the documentary on Twitter, calling it "bullshit" and claiming he "couldn't give a fuck" about the programme.
