= Larries =

Internet fandom

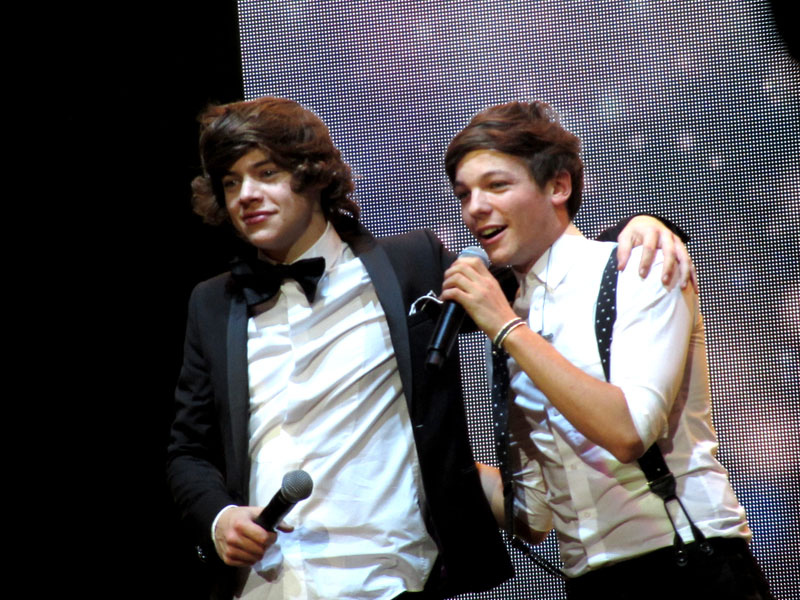
Styles and Tomlinson in 2012

Larries are shippers who believe that the former One Direction bandmates Harry Styles and Louis Tomlinson had or still have a long-term and secret romantic relationship. A fundamental part of this conspiracy theory is that the two, name blended as Larry Stylinson, have had their sexual identities concealed by their management company, Modest Management, supposedly guided by homophobic corporate interests.

Even after repeated public disavowals from the pair, belief in the theory has not diminished over time. Larries have been one of the largest contingents in the One Direction fandom since the band's early days. Larries have a strong presence on social media, and the ship has regularly topped mentions on various fan fiction and social media sites.

== History ==
=== Beginnings ===
One Direction formed on The X Factor in 2010 and self-described Larries emerged soon after, inspired by the pair's close and public relationship. Since the beginning, most Larries have been insistent that Styles and Tomlinson have a real-life romantic relationship. According to an anonymous One Direction fan interviewed by The Daily Dot in 2012, "There's no real space in fandom for people who ship Harry/Louis in the fictional sense." Larries have been criticised for analysing Styles and Tomlinson's interactions to find evidence that a romantic relationship exists, and the fandom has often been described as "tinhatting", unable to separate fiction from reality.

Louis Tomlinson
(@Louis_Tomlinson)
tweeted:

Always in my heart @Harry_Styles . Yours sincerely, Louis

2 October 2011

In October 2011, Tomlinson posted a tweet that read, "Always in my heart @Harry_Styles . Yours sincerely, Louis". The tweet is central to the fandom, and as of January 2015, it was the second-most retweeted tweet of all time with over 2 million retweets. Since the conception of the conspiracy theory, some Larries have harassed Styles and Tomlinson, their friends and family, and journalists covering Larries. As early as 2012, Tomlinson said that the popularity of the theory was negatively affecting the way he and Styles behaved in public. Tomlinson also referred to Larry as "bullshit" and "conspiracy theories" on Twitter around this time. This did not deter Larries from regularly speculating when Styles and Tomlinson might announce their relationship to the public.

=== Crazy About One Direction ===
In 2013, British documentarian Daisy Asquith was tasked by Channel 4 to create a television documentary about fans of One Direction, also focusing on Larries. Within 24 hours of Crazy About One Direction's release, a viral hoax circulated online, claiming that 42 fans who believed in the Larry Stylinson theory had committed suicide as a result of the documentary. #RIPLarryShippers trended on Twitter following the hoax. The suicide rumours were constructed both in response to the documentary prominently featuring Larries and the conspiracy theory, and in response to anti-Larries using the documentary as an excuse to criticise Larrie behaviours. Asquith and Channel 4 also received bomb and death threats. In the documentary, Larries were accused of bringing shame onto the One Direction fandom by making all One Direction fans look crazy. Hashtags like #thisisnotus were used by One Direction members to separate themselves from Larries after the documentary's release. The increased visibility of the Larry Stylinson conspiracy theory and perceived public shaming caused Larries' ranks to tighten and their beliefs to become more extreme.

=== "Rainbow Bondage Bears" and other symbols ===
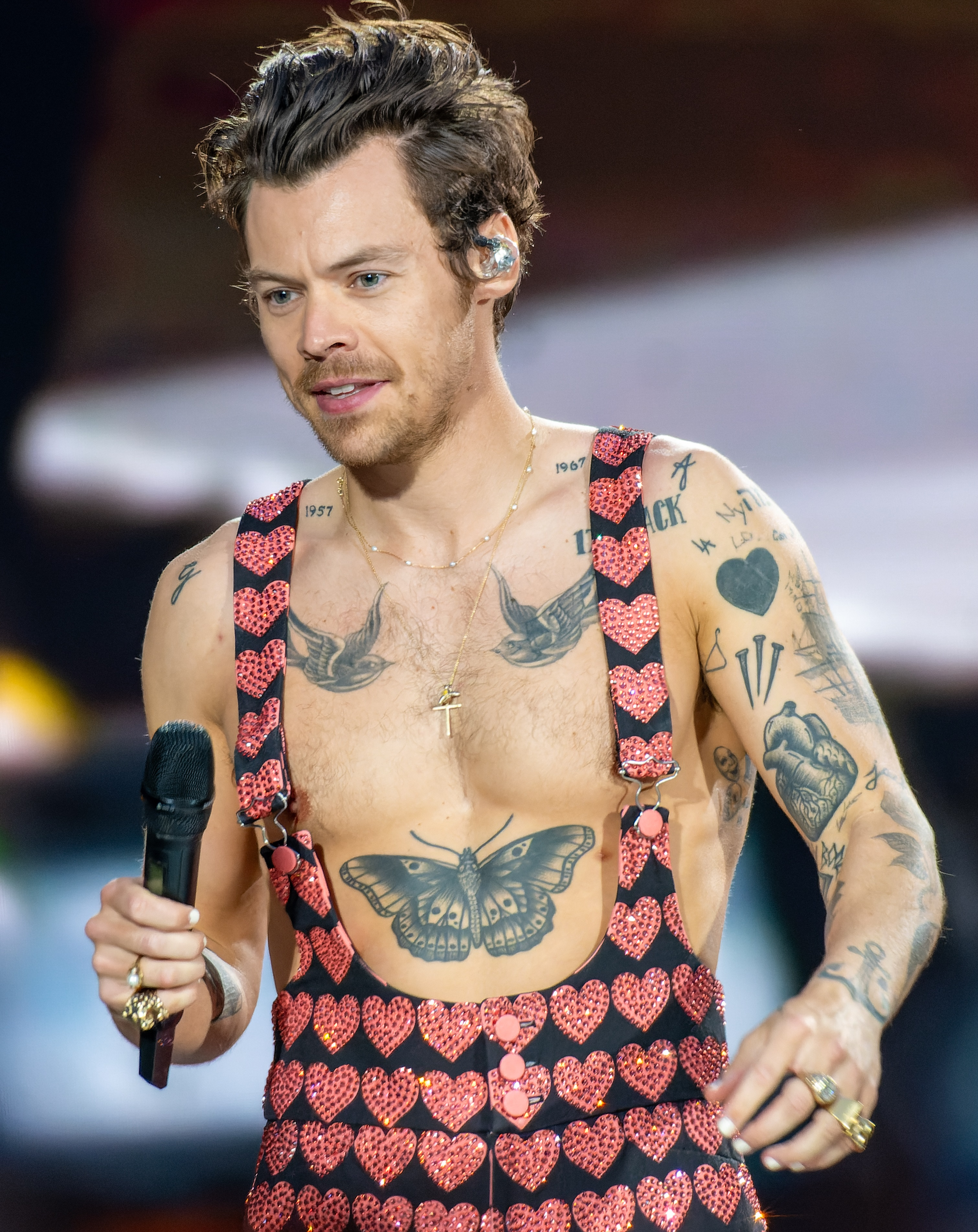
Harry Styles with visible tattoos, 2023

By 2014, Larries believed that Tomlinson and Styles were sending secret messages directly to them. One manifestation of this belief came in the form of "Rainbow Bondage Bears" that could be seen onstage at One Direction concerts in 2014 and 2015. These stuffed bears (originally owned by fans who threw them onstage during concerts) were later placed onstage during concerts and dressed in costumes reminiscent of prominent gay icons, such as Freddie Mercury and Judy Garland. Sometimes the bears seemed to hint at the Larry conspiracy, such as when a bear was posed next to a sign that said "Love, Larry" with a picture of Larry Grayson attached. The context of the bears is still unclear, but the band has denied it having any significance to the personal lives of Styles or Tomlinson.

In addition to the Rainbow Bondage Bears, fans have invented other symbolism that might signify Styles and Tomlinson are trying to communicate with them about their secret love for one another. The unsubstantiated claims include:

- Styles and Tomlinson have matching tattoos. One example is Styles' rose and Tomlinson's dagger, which Larries suggest combine to form a common rose-and-dagger tattoo design that represents tragic love. Larries also claim that the tattoos of swallows on Styles' chest represent Styles and Tomlinson, with the larger bird representing Styles due to its unusual slanted eyebrow, and the smaller bird representing Tomlinson's smaller size.
- Appearances of the colors green and blue represent Styles and Tomlinson respectively. This association is drawn because Styles used green tape and Tomlinson used blue tape on their wireless microphones while touring with One Direction, and because blue is the color of Tomlinson's eyes.
- Styles and Tomlinson are invested in a form of numerology related to the number 28, which Larries believe to be related to Styles and Tomlinson's purported wedding day, 28 September 2013. The number has been found in many things, from Tomlinson's number 28 football jersey to the release date of Styles' movie Dunkirk (7/21) adding up to the number 28.
- Tomlinson liking a supposed "Larry video" on Instagram that featured a clip of him and his former bandmate, Harry Styles. The reel was an emotional fan edit set to the song Die With a Smile. This incident occurred during the Glastonbury festival in 2025, which Styles and Tomlinson both attended.

This clue-finding process has allowed the conspiracy theory to sustain itself up to the present day, despite Styles and Tomlinson's public absences from each other's lives since One Direction went on indefinite hiatus in 2016.

=== Babygate ===
When Tomlinson's friend became pregnant with his child in 2015, some Larries found it difficult to reconcile the fact that Tomlinson was going to have a child with someone else with their belief that he was in a monogamous relationship with Styles. To resolve the cognitive dissonance, some Larries constructed a conspiracy theory called "Babygate", which asserts that the pregnancy was faked by Tomlinson's management. These Larries claim that Tomlinson and his friend used a doll to pretend a baby had been born from the pregnancy and then, as the child aged, the doll was replaced by an actor or another member of Tomlinson's friend's family. The bodies and behavior of Tomlinson and his friend were scrutinized for signs that Tomlinson's friend was faking the pregnancy, and photos of them were analysed in Photoshop for signs of editing.

The mother of Tomlinson's child has commented on the conspiracy theories, calling them "sick and morally wrong". In 2016, an anonymous caller told Tomlinson, "I hope your baby dies".

=== Solo careers ===
One Direction's breakup splintered the fanbase into seven distinct, though sometimes overlapping, factions: Harries (fans of Harry Styles), Louies (fans of Louis Tomlinson), Zquad (fans of Zayn Malik), Lovers (fans of Niall Horan), Paynos (fans of Liam Payne), OT4/OT5s (fans of One Direction generally) and Larries. There is also a substantial community of One Direction-adjacent fans called "antis" who spend large amounts of time online countering the things that Larries say and do. Ex-Larries often contribute to this anti-conspiracy work by creating posts invoking the experience of "leaving a cult."

Since the beginning of his solo career, Styles has dressed androgynously, singing songs and making music videos invoking sexual fluidity and waving pride flags at his concerts. He has also refused to label his sexuality. To explain Styles behaving this way while Tomlinson has explicitly stated he is straight, some Larries have constructed a martyrdom narrative for Tomlinson, where he is sacrificing himself to allow Styles greater freedom. These Larries believe that Tomlinson is being kept "in chains" so that Styles can experience a life where he is commercially successful and sexually free. At the same time, many Larries still hold the contradictory belief that Styles dates women as an attempt to hide his relationship with Tomlinson. This resulted in the harassment of Styles' then-girlfriend Olivia Wilde on TikTok in 2022.

=== Harassment ===
Larries have been known to bully and harass Styles' and Tomlinson's partners. The harassment extended to include the mother of Tomlinson's child, the family of one of his girlfriends, and an unrelated family with the same surname.

== Content ==
Larries believe that Tomlinson and Styles are or were in a romantic relationship. The core evidence cited by proponents of the conspiracy typically consists of video clips that they interpret as showing romantic gestures, such as glances, touches, or other interpersonal interactions. These videos, sometimes turned into gifs on platforms like Tumblr or gathered into compilations on platforms like YouTube, make an impact on the viewer through repetition. A hug between Styles and Tomlinson at a 2015 concert became a "prized Larry Stylinson moment" by the way fans shared differently angled photographs of the moment, including it as a highlight in videos, and used it as inspiration for fan art and fan fiction. An additional aspect of the theory is that the driving force for their being closeted is their management company, Modest Management, who controlled their social media. In this narrative, Modest promoted masculine pictures of the pair, made Styles the "womanizer", contractually forbade the pair from being out as gay, and provided both men with fake girlfriends.

People who become intrigued by the conspiracy may be directed to more detailed written content, which ranges from day-by-day timelines of their relationship to intricate explanations of the Babygate theory. Many accounts that update on One Direction, Styles, and Tomlinson are run by Larries who will only post content that aligns with the conspiracy, and new Larries are encouraged to only follow them. Proponents have used the hashtag #LarryIsReal.

One former Larry, when interviewed about this type of content filtering, reported that accounts "wouldn't reblog updates or photos about 'beard' relationships" and that Styles' many gay friends were also ignored by these accounts because "it didn't fit a narrative of him as an oppressed gay man."As of 2020, Larry Stylinson was the most reblogged ship on Tumblr.

Erotic slash fiction featuring Larry exists, as do other forms of fan art, including femslash, which depicts Larry as lesbians. Artist Owen G Parry made several Larry-themed artworks that were displayed in a 2016 London exhibition. Parry has said that Larry shipping can be "a safe place to test out your sexuality, a fantasy space" for many young fans. Tomlinson said of online Larry fan fiction in 2022 that "It's weird, all that shit but there's not much you can do about it. I'd rather they didn't, but it is what it is, I won't be watching."

== Ideology ==
Styles and Tomlinson's decreased interaction over the years has caused conspiracy-theorist fans to view themselves as "mouthpieces" for the two men.

Kaitlyn Tiffany, author and Directioner, states that "... [Larries] would often kind of accuse other fans of being homophobic if they didn't support Larry Stylinson. [...] Anti-Larries would often dwell on Larries and try to pick apart their logic and shout them down in a way that was maybe unnecessary. It became a huge distraction." She also says that non-Larry Directioners dislike media coverage that made the Larries something of the public face of the fandom.

As of 2022, Larries are generally young women around the age of 20. Academics Clare Southerton and Hannah McCann say:

Larries have been portrayed largely as a bizarre expression of the wider Directioner fandom, an inexplicable post-truth variation of the hysterical fangirl. [...] Larries reveal complex forms of desire that appear to belong more to the collective-the desiring community-than to the individual. Queering the figure of the fangirl, we find that far from simply lusting after their boyband idols, Larries desire desire itself. While fake news framings are concerned with getting to "truth", they often miss the overarching sociopolitical paradigms [...] The ultimate lesson from the Larry fandom is not proof of whether Larry is real, but rather, the creation of a space for the queerness of Larry to be real, whether really real, or not.

They also comment on the fan group's complex relation to slash fiction and queerbaiting.

== Response ==
Styles and Tomlinson have repeatedly criticised and disavowed the theory since its inception, with Tomlinson stating the conspiracy damaged their relationship. In 2012, Tomlinson tweeted:

Hows this, Larry is the biggest load of bullshit I've ever heard. I'm happy why can't you accept that.

Former One Direction bandmate Zayn Malik addressed the conspiracy in 2015, saying that there were no secret relationships within the band and the belief had taken a toll on Styles and Tomlinson, who refrained from physically intimate behaviour like hugging as a result. Band member Liam Payne said in 2015 that symbols at One Direction concerts like rainbow flags to indicate support of the conspiracy "drives [him] insane".

Tomlinson blocked the word "Larry" from his Instagram comments in 2016, resulting in over 100,000 comments by Larries including variations of the word like "Lerry" and "Larrrrry". In 2017, when asked if his song "Sweet Creature" was about Tomlinson, Styles responded saying that although he did not "want to tell anyone that they're wrong for feeling what they feel about a song", he "would lean towards no". Tomlinson said in an interview with The Guardian that he knew the theory was culturally interesting but was tired of it.

Tomlinson stated the theory was "childish" in 2023. In 2024, he said:

What I realized a few years ago is that there is nothing I can say. There is nothing I can do to stop those who believe in this conspiracy. They are so connected to what they believe that they will not see the truth for what it really is. I'm sure many people look at and find all these little conspiracies that happen in life interesting. I'd be lying if I said it didn't irritate me a little, but that's the nature of the job. There are times when it gets very personal. I have my son, Freddie. He's the most important person in my life. And occasionally, [these theories] end up addressing things that are kind of unfair. That's what we have now. There's nothing I can do about it. Nothing I can say to stop people from inventing what they want to invent. So, so be it.

Academic Abby Richards, who researches disinformation on TikTok, has said of conspiracy theories, "We've seen that time and time again this can absolutely translate to real-world harm." However, McCann and Southerton question the motives behind "dismissing Larries as merely dangerous" and question what paradigm they might be dangerous to. They say that framing Larries exclusively as consumers and spreaders of fake news "miss[es] the overarching socio-political paradigms that shape what can be seen, heard, and represented in the first instance." Tiffany challenges this viewpoint, claiming fans were "robbed" of neutrality towards Larry once it was seen as "serious business" due to it interfering with Styles and Tomlinson's personal lives.

== In context of related communities ==
Larry Stylinson was not the first real person fiction (RPF) conspiracy that drew large numbers of "tinhats", fans who believe the public figures they ship really are in a secret relationship. The term was first coined in 2003 as a derogatory way to refer to fans who believed Elijah Wood and Dominic Monaghan had a secret relationship that formed while working on the set of Lord of the Rings. Other pairings with similar theories surrounding them include actors Jensen Ackles and Jared Padalecki from the CW television show Supernatural, as well as singer-songwriter Taylor Swift and model Karlie Kloss.

"Babygate" is also not alone in speculation that celebrity pregnancies and babies are fake. Benedict Cumberbatch has been subjected to fans speculating about his wife's pregnancy. Zayn Malik and Liam Payne have also been subjected to "babygates" of their own. According to academic Anna Martin, these conspiracies are common because "star texts allow for fantasies not only of wealth and leisure, but of a life in which love is the only concern." Kaitlyn Tiffany, writing for The Atlantic, observed that "modern theories about 'fake' celebrity babies come with a cocktail of resentment toward the hypocrisy of celebrity, the dishonesty of the media, and the unflappable confidence of the elite, who get away with whatever they want [. . .] The internet didn't invent conspiracism, but it did make spreading conspiracy theories easier and more fun."

Like many other conspiracy theorists, Larries have a strong presence on social media, and on TikTok in particular. The #larrystylinson tag on TikTok has 7.5 billion collective views as of May 2022. The spread of conspiracy theories on TikTok is well documented. According to anthropologist Joseph Russo, "In a moment in which young people feel they're living in a really chaotic world where not much makes sense, certain conspiracy theories can feel like a security blanket, because they tell us there is actually an order underneath it all."

== In popular culture ==
Larries have appeared in popular culture outside their own fandom, examples include:

- The 2017 young adult novel Grace and the Fever was inspired by the Larry fandom.
- In 2019, the teen drama Euphoria depicted an animated sex scene between Styles and Tomlinson due to one of its characters, Kat, being a notorious One Direction fanfic writer. The show portrays Kat as the inventor of the Larry Stylinson ship. Following the release of the episode, both Larry conspiracy theorists and non-conspiracy theorist fans of Styles and Tomlinson expressed outrage that the ship was portrayed in the show. Styles and Tomlinson had not approved the sequence.
- Kaitlyn Tiffany's 2022 book on One Direction fandom, Everything I Need I Get from You: How Fangirls Created the Internet as We Know It, spends two chapters on Larries.

== See also ==
- Gaylor – a similar celebrity theory about Taylor Swift
- Johnlock – Sherlock-inspired shipping
- Stan (fan) – an excessively avid fan
