= 2009 in Canadian music =

This is a summary of the year 2009 in the Canadian music industry.

== Events ==
- March 29 – The Juno Awards of 2009 are held in Vancouver, British Columbia.
- June 15 – The 2009 Polaris Music Prize 40-album longlist is announced.
- July 7 – The 2009 Polaris Music Prize 10-album shortlist is to be announced.
- September 21 – Fucked Up's album The Chemistry of Common Life is announced as the winner of the 2009 Polaris Music Prize.
- September – K'naan's single "Wavin' Flag" is announced as the official theme song of the 2010 FIFA World Cup.

== Albums ==
=== A ===
- Apostle of Hustle, Eats Darkness
- Marie-Pierre Arthur, Marie-Pierre Arthur
- Attack in Black, Years (by One Thousand Fingertips)

=== B ===
- Jason Bajada, Loveshit
- Alexis Baro, From the Other Side
- Howie Beck, How to Fall Down in Public
- Daniel Bélanger, Nous
- Bell Orchestre, As Seen Through Windows
- Art Bergmann, Lost Art Bergmann
- Justin Bieber, My World
- Billy Talent, Billy Talent III
- Jully Black, The Black Book
- Blue Rodeo, The Things We Left Behind
- Will Bonness, Subtle Fire
- Brian Borcherdt, Torches/The Ward Colorado Demos
- Michael Jerome Browne, This Beautiful Mess
- Bruce Peninsula, A Mountain Is a Mouth
- Michael Bublé, Crazy Love
- By Divine Right, Mutant Message

=== C ===
- Patricia Cano, This Is the New World
- Paul Cargnello, Bras coupé
- CFCF, Continent
- DJ Champion, Resistance
- Classified, Self Explanatory
- The Cliks, Dirty King
- Leonard Cohen, Live in London
- Antoine Corriveau, Ni vu ni connu
- Rose Cousins, The Send Off
- Eliana Cuevas, Luna Llena
- Cuff the Duke, Way Down Here
- Amelia Curran, Hunter Hunter

=== D ===
- The Dardanelles, The Dardanelles
- Default, Comes and Goes
- Despised Icon, Day of Mourning
- Digawolf, Distant Morning Star
- Julie Doiron, I Can Wonder What You Did with Your Day
- Drake, So Far Gone

=== E ===
- Emerson Drive, I Believe
- Evening Hymns, Spirit Guides

=== F ===
- Julie Fader, Outside In
- Melanie Fiona, The Bridge
- Faber Drive, Can't Keep a Secret

=== G ===
- Gentleman Reg, Jet Black
- Hannah Georgas, The Beat Stuff
- The Good Lovelies, The Good Lovelies (March), Under the Mistletoe (December)
- Jenn Grant, Echoes
- Grand Analog, Metropolis Is Burning
- Great Bloomers, Speak of Trouble
- Great Lake Swimmers, Lost Channels (March), The Legion Sessions (October)
- Emm Gryner, Goddess

=== H ===
- Handsome Furs, Face Control
- Ron Hawkins, 10 Kinds of Lonely
- Hayden, The Place Where We Lived
- Hedley, The Show Must Go
- The Hidden Cameras, Origin:Orphan
- Hollerado, Record in a Bag
- Hot Panda, Volcano...Bloody Volcano
- The Hylozoists, L'Île de sept villes

=== I ===
- Immaculate Machine, High on Jackson Hill
- In-Flight Safety, We Are an Empire, My Dear
- Islands, Vapours

=== J ===
- jacksoul, SOULmate
- Japandroids, Post-Nothing
- Jets Overhead, No Nations
- The Junction, Another Link in the Chain
- Junior Boys, Begone Dull Care

=== K ===
- K'naan, Troubadour
- k-os, Yes!
- Kalle Mattson, Whisper Bee

=== L ===
- Lhasa, Lhasa
- Lightning Dust, Infinite Light
- Lights, The Listening
- The Lovely Feathers, Fantasy of the Lot

=== M ===
- Ryan MacGrath, In My Own Company
- Catherine MacLellan, Water in the Ground
- Magneta Lane, Gambling with God
- Malajube, Labyrinthes
- Dan Mangan, Nice, Nice, Very Nice
- Carolyn Mark and NQ Arbuckle, Let's Just Stay Here
- Melissa McClelland, Victoria Day
- Metric, Fantasies
- Amy Millan, Masters of the Burial
- Misstress Barbara, I'm No Human
- Taylor Mitchell, For Your Consideration
- Moneen, The World I Want to Leave Behind
- Montag, Hibernation
- The Most Serene Republic, ...And the Ever Expanding Universe
- MSTRKRFT, Fist of God

=== N ===
- The New Cities, Lost in City Lights

=== O ===
- Octoberman, Fortresses
- Ohbijou, Beacons
- Oktoécho, Oktoécho
- Our Lady Peace, Burn Burn

=== P ===
- Paper Moon, Only During Thunderstorms
- Peaches, I Feel Cream
- Pilot Speed, Wooden Bones
- Pink Mountaintops, Outside Love
- Joel Plaskett, Three
- Po' Girl, Deer in the Night
- Pony Up!, Stay Gold
- Priestess, Prior to the Fire
- Propagandhi, Supporting Caste

=== R ===
- Corin Raymond, There Will Always Be a Small Time
- Lee Reed, Introductory Offer
- Reverie Sound Revue, Reverie Sound Revue
- Amanda Rheaume, Kiss Me Back
- Alejandra Ribera, Navigator/Navigateher
- Rock Plaza Central, ...at the moment of our most needing
- Royal City, Royal City
- Ruby Jean and the Thoughtful Bees, Ruby Jean and the Thoughtful Bees
- Daniel Romano, Frederick Squire and Julie Doiron, Daniel, Fred & Julie
- The Rural Alberta Advantage, Hometowns

=== S ===
- John K. Samson, City Route 85
- Crystal Shawanda, I'll Be Home for Christmas
- Shout Out Out Out Out, Reintegration Time
- The Slew, 100%
- Social Code, Rock 'n' Roll
- Souldia, Art kontrol
- John Southworth, Mama Tevatron
- Still Life Still, Girls Come Too
- Sunparlour Players, Wave North
- Sunset Rubdown, Dragonslayer
- Swan Lake, Enemy Mine

=== T ===
- Tegan and Sara, Sainthood
- Think About Life, Family
- Thousand Foot Krutch, Welcome to the Masquerade
- Three Days Grace, Life Starts Now
- Thunderheist, Thunderheist
- Thus Owls, Cardiac Malformations
- Tiga, Ciao!
- Timber Timbre, Timber Timbre
- Tire le coyote, EP
- Torngat, La Petite Nicole
- The Tragically Hip, We Are the Same
- Two Hours Traffic, Territory

=== U ===
- Ubiquitous Synergy Seeker, Questamation
- United Steel Workers of Montreal, Three on the Tree

=== V ===
- Various Artists, Friends in Bellwoods II
- Various Artists, Great Canadian Song Quest
- Various Artists, Record of the Week Club
- vitaminsforyou, He Closed His Eyes So He Could Dance with You
- Roch Voisine, Americana II

=== W ===
- Martha Wainwright, Sans Fusils, Ni Souliers, à Paris: Martha Wainwright's Piaf Record
- Patrick Watson, Wooden Arms
- Wax Mannequin, Saxon
- WHOOP-Szo, Where I Dream Is Where I Live
- The Wooden Sky, If I Don't Come Home You'll Know I'm Gone

=== Y ===
- Years, Years
- You Say Party! We Say Die!, XXXX
- Young Galaxy, Invisible Republic

=== Z ===
- Zeus, Sounds Like Zeus

== Top hits on record ==
=== Top 10 albums ===
These are the top selling albums in Canada. These albums consist of Canadian sales only.

Rank	Artist	Album	Peak position	Sales	Certification
1	Michael Bublé	Crazy Love	1	320,000	4× Platinum
2	The Canadian Tenors	The Perfect Gift	n/a	240,000	3× Platinum
3	Ginette Reno	Fais-Moi De La Tendresse	n/a	209,000	n/a
4	Billy Talent	Billy Talent III	1	160,000	2× Platinum
5	Hedley	The Show Must Go	6	160,000	2× Platinum
6	Johnny Reid	Dance with Me	3	160,000	2× Platinum
7	Justin Bieber	My World	1	160,000	2× Platinum
8	The Tragically Hip	We Are the Same	1	160,000	2× Platinum
9	Blue Rodeo	The Things We Left Behind	6	80,000	Platinum
10	Johnny Reid	Christmas	7	80,000	Platinum

=== Top 10 American albums ===
Rank	Artist	Album	Peak position	Sales	Certification
1	The Black Eyed Peas	The E.N.D.	1	400,000	5× Platinum
2	Eminem	Relapse	1	195,000	n/a
3	Green Day	21st Century Breakdown	1	160,000	2× Platinum
4	Michael Jackson	This Is It	1	160,000	2× Platinum
5	Adam Lambert	For Your Entertainment	8	80,000	Platinum
6	Bon Jovi	The Circle	1	80,000	Platinum
7	Bruce Springsteen	Working on a Dream	1	80,000	Platinum
8	Carrie Underwood	Play On	2	80,000	Platinum
9	Daughtry	Leave This Town	2	80,000	Platinum
10	Glee	Glee: The Music, Volume 1	4	80,000	Platinum

=== Top 10 British albums ===
Rank	Artist	Album	Peak position	Sales	Certification
1	The Beatles	The Beatles Stereo Box Set	n/a	800,000	Diamond
2	Susan Boyle	I Dreamed a Dream	1	400,000	5× Platinum
3	Mumford & Sons	Sigh No More	2	160,000	2× Platinum
4	Muse	The Resistance	1	80,000	Platinum
5	Florence and the Machine	Lungs	21	40,000	Gold
6	Leona Lewis	Echo	16	40,000	Gold
7	Lily Allen	It's Not Me, It's You	1	40,000	Gold
8	Mika	The Boy Who Knew Too Much	19	40,000	Gold
9	Taio Cruz	Rokstarr	3	40,000	Gold
10	The xx	xx	n/a	40,000	Gold

=== Top International albums ===
Rank	Artist	Album	Peak position	Sales	Certification
1	Andrea Bocelli	My Christmas	2	264,000	2× Platinum
2	David Guetta	One Love	2	160,000	2× Platinum
3	U2	No Line on the Horizon	1	160,000	2× Platinum
4	Rihanna	Rated R	5	80,000	Platinum
5	Rod Stewart	Soulbook	3	80,000	Platinum
6	Bernard Adamus	Burn	TBA	40,000	Gold
7	Phoenix	Wolfgang Amadeus Phoenix	19	40,000	Gold
8	Tiësto	Kaleidoscope	6	40,000	Gold
9	Daniel O'Donnell	Hope and Praise	n/a	5,000	Gold

=== Canadian Hot 100 Year-End List ===
No.	Artist(s)	Title
1	The Black Eyed Peas	"I Gotta Feeling"
2	Lady Gaga	"Poker Face"
3	Flo Rida	"Right Round"
4	The Black Eyed Peas	"Boom Boom Pow"
5	Jason Mraz	"I'm Yours"
6	Sean Kingston	"Fire Burning"
7	Pitbull	"I Know You Want Me (Calle Ocho)"
8	Taylor Swift	"Love Story"
9	Karl Wolf featuring Culture	"Africa"
10	Kings of Leon	"Use Somebody"
11	Katy Perry	"Hot n Cold"
12	Beyoncé	"Halo"
13	Lady Gaga	"LoveGame"
14	Taylor Swift	"You Belong with Me"
15	Britney Spears	"Circus"
16	David Guetta featuring Akon	"Sexy Bitch"
17	Miley Cyrus	"The Climb"
18	Lady Gaga	"Paparazzi"
19	Beyoncé	"Single Ladies (Put a Ring on It)"
20	Kelly Clarkson	"My Life Would Suck Without You"
21	Coldplay	"Viva la Vida"
22	Nickelback	"If Today Was Your Last Day"
23	Pink	"Please Don't Leave Me"
24	T.I. featuring Rihanna	"Live Your Life"
25	T.I. featuring Justin Timberlake	"Dead and Gone"
26	Kevin Rudolf featuring Lil Wayne	"Let It Rock"
27	Nickelback	"Gotta Be Somebody"
28	Katy Perry	"Waking Up in Vegas"
29	The Pussycat Dolls	"I Hate This Part"
30	Pink	"Sober"
31	Beyoncé	"If I Were a Boy"
32	The All-American Rejects	"Gives You Hell"
33	Miley Cyrus	"Party in the U.S.A."
34	The Fray	"You Found Me"
35	Stereos	"Summer Girl"
36	Britney Spears	"Womanizer"
37	3OH!3	"Don't Trust Me"
38	Cascada	"Evacuate the Dancefloor"
39	Deborah Cox	"Beautiful U R"
40	Jay Sean featuring Lil Wayne	"Down"
41	Keri Hilson featuring Kanye West and Ne-Yo	"Knock You Down"
42	Lady Gaga featuring Colby O'Donis	"Just Dance"
43	Marianas Trench	"Cross My Heart"
44	Cobra Starship featuring Leighton Meester	"Good Girls Go Bad"
45	Akon featuring Colby O'Donis and Kardinal Offishall	"Beautiful"
46	Marianas Trench	"All to Myself"
47	Kanye West	"Heartless"
48	Faber Drive	"G-Get Up and Dance"
49	Jordin Sparks	"Battlefield"
50	A. R. Rahman and The Pussycat Dolls featuring Nicole Scherzinger	"Jai Ho! (You Are My Destiny)"
51	Linkin Park	"New Divide"
52	The Veronicas	"Untouched"
53	Jay-Z, Rihanna and Kanye West	"Run This Town"
54	Akon	"Right Now (Na Na Na)"
55	Pitbull	"Hotel Room Service"
56	Shinedown	"Second Chance"
57	Shakira	"She Wolf"
58	Hedley	"Cha-Ching"
59	Pink	"So What"
60	Soulja Boy featuring Sammie	"Kiss Me thru the Phone"
61	Billy Talent	"Rusted from the Rain"
62	Kid Cudi	"Day 'n' Nite"
63	Jason Derulo	"Whatcha Say"
64	Daughtry	"No Surprise"
65	Kanye West	"Love Lockdown"
66	Green Day	"21 Guns"
67	Ciara featuring Justin Timberlake	"Love Sex Magic"
68	Britney Spears	"If U Seek Amy"
69	The New Cities	"Dead End Countdown"
70	Kelly Clarkson	"Already Gone"
71	Britney Spears	"3"
72	Green Day	"Know Your Enemy"
73	Madonna	"Celebration"
74	Owl City	"Fireflies"
75	The Black Eyed Peas	"Meet Me Halfway"
76	Kesha	"Tik Tok"
77	Flo Rida featuring Wynter Gordon	"Sugar"
78	Kelly Clarkson	"I Do Not Hook Up"
79	Drake	"Best I Ever Had"
80	Eminem, Dr. Dre and 50 Cent	"Crack a Bottle"
81	Justin Bieber	"One Time"
82	Beyoncé	"Sweet Dreams"
83	Danny Fernandes	"Fantasy"
84	Michael Bublé	"Haven't Met You Yet"
85	Stereos	"Throw Ya Hands Up"
86	Ne-Yo	"Mad"
87	Divine Brown	"Sunglasses"
88	Jamie Foxx featuring T-Pain	"Blame It"
89	Rihanna	"Rehab"
90	Our Lady Peace	"All You Did Was Save My Life"
91	Rihanna	"Disturbia"
92	David Guetta featuring Kelly Rowland	"When Love Takes Over"
93	Melanie Fiona	"Give It to Me Right"
94	Mariah Carey	"Obsessed"
95	The Killers	"Spaceman"
96	Leona Lewis	"Better in Time"
97	Suzie McNeil	"Supergirl"
98	Rob Thomas	"Her Diamonds"
99	Colbie Caillat	"Fallin' for You"
100	State of Shock	"Too Pretty"

== Deaths ==
- January 31 – Dewey Martin, rock drummer
- March 15 – Edmund Hockridge, singer and actor
- March 22 – Archie Green, folklorist and musicologist
- May 3 – Renée Morisset, pianist
- June 27 – Jackie Washington, blues musician
- October 28 – Taylor Mitchell, folk singer-songwriter
- November 22 – Haydain Neale, soul/R&B singer

Preceded by 2008 in Canadian music	Canadian music 2009	Succeeded by 2010 in Canadian music
