= Stereo (disambiguation) =

Stereo, or stereophonic sound, is the reproduction of sound using two or more independent audio channels.

Stereo or stereophonic may also refer to:

== Film, television, and theater ==
- Stereo (1969 film), a film by David Cronenberg
- Stereo (2014 film), a German film
- 3D film, using stereo imaging
- Stereophonic (play), a 2023 stage play

== Music ==
- Home audio, which include audio systems often referred to as "stereos"
- Car stereo
- Boombox

=== Bands ===
- The Stereo, an American pop rock band
- Stereos (band), a Canadian pop rock band
- The Stereos, an American doo wop group
- Stereophonics, a Welsh pop rock band

=== Albums ===
- Stereo, an alternative name for Christie Front Drive (album), 1997
- Stereo (Paul Westerberg album), 2002
- Stereo (Vallejo album), 2002
- Stereos (album), by Stereos, 2009
- Stereo, by Gemeliers, 2018

=== Songs ===
- "Stereo", by Sparks from Terminal Jive, 1980
- "Stereo", by America from Perspective, 1984
- "Stereo" (Pavement song), 1997
- "Stereo" (The Watchmen song), 1998
- "Stereo" (John Legend song), 2007
- "Stereo", by Unklejam, 2007
- "Stereo" (Anna Abreu song), 2011
- "Stereo" (MGK song), 2012

== Other uses ==
- Stereo, abbreviation for stereotype (printing)
- STEREO, a pair of NASA solar observatory spacecraft
- STEREO experiment, a physics experiment

== See also ==
- High fidelity
- Stereopsis
- Stereoscopy
