= What Makes You Beautiful =

2011 single by One Direction

Single by One Direction

from the album Up All Night
- B-side: "Na Na Na"
- Released: 11 September 2011
- Recorded: August 2010–July 2011
- Studio: Malibu, California; Kinglet & Cosmos Studios, Stockholm, Sweden
- Genre: Power pop; pop rock; teen pop; bubblegum pop; electropop
- Length: 3:18
- Label: Syco; Columbia
- Songwriters: Savan Kotecha; Rami Yacoub; Carl Falk
- Producers: Rami Yacoub; Carl Falk

One Direction singles chronology
"What Makes You Beautiful" (2011)	"Gotta Be You" (2011)

Music video
- "What Makes You Beautiful" on YouTube

"What Makes You Beautiful" (often abbreviated as WMYB) is the debut single by the British-Irish boy band One Direction. It was the lead single from their debut album, Up All Night (2011). Written by Savan Kotecha and producer Rami Yacoub, the song was released by Syco Records on 11 September 2011. The uptempo power pop track features a prominent guitar-based chorus and riff. The middle eight consists of a "na na na" hook.

"What Makes You Beautiful" was a commercial success, reaching number one in several countries. It has been certified quadruple platinum in the US with sales of 4.8 million copies as of June 2016. The single peaked at number four on the US Billboard Hot 100 and number one on the UK Singles Chart. The song won the 2012 Brit Award for British Single of the Year and was generally complimented by contemporary music critics, who highlighted the appeal to the teenage audience and the pop sensibility. It debuted at number one on the UK Singles Chart after setting a Sony Music Entertainment pre-order record and selling 153,965 copies in its first week. The single topped the Irish and Scottish Singles Charts, and reached the top ten on the Australian and New Zealand Singles Charts, Flemish Ultratop 50, Canadian Hot 100, and the Japan Hot 100.

The song's accompanying music video, directed by John Urbano, was uploaded to YouTube on 19 August 2011. It depicts One Direction spending time on Sycamore Cove Beach in Malibu, California. The video garnered three MTV Video Music Awards at the 2012 ceremony. One Direction performed the song live on televised shows, at awards ceremonies, and on all four of their headlining concert tours: Up All Night Tour (2011–12), Take Me Home Tour (2013), Where We Are Tour (2014), and On the Road Again Tour (2015); band member Harry Styles performed the song on his 2017 and 2021 solo tours. Many artists have covered the song, including the Piano Guys, Boyce Avenue, and Enhypen. It is often regarded as One Direction's signature song, and one of the most iconic and recognisable pop songs of the 2010s.

== Background and production ==
"What Makes You Beautiful" was written by Savan Kotecha and Carl Falk and produced by Yacoub and Falk. Instrumentation was completed by Falk and Yacoub. Serban Ghenea handled the audio mixing, Tom Coyne the audio mastering, and John Hanes the mix engineering, for which Phil Seaford served as the assistant. Discussing the song's conception, Kotecha said:

I had the melody of the chorus in my song for about a year until I was in a hotel room in London with my wife and she was having a bad morning. She was like, "Oh, I feel so ugly" and I was like, "No, you look beautiful. You don't know how beautiful you look." And I was like, "Oh, crap! That's a good song! Hold on!" And I wrote that down. I actually wrote the song for my wife, so I went to the studio and it took a process of a couple weeks to really tweak it, but the core of it was written within two days and then tweaked a few things here and there over a couple weeks, but I mean, I still have the text message from Harry [Styles]. When he heard the demo, I was in Miami on my way back to Sweden, and he sent me a text message saying, "I think you got it. I think you got the one here."

After recording the song at Cosmos Studios and Kinglet Studios in Stockholm, Sweden, the band felt relieved to have a song that they were happy to release as their debut single. Band member Liam Payne called the song "perfect", and Harry Styles said, "When we were recording in the studio we knew instantly that we wanted this track to be our first single." Styles spoke to MTV News, "I think for us we wanted to release something that wasn't cheesy but it was fun. It kind of represented us, I think it took us a while to find it but I think we found the right song." Payne added, "We always wanted [the single] to be something that people didn't expect and then when we heard it, it wasn't what we expected either so it kind of fitted perfectly."

== Release and promotion ==
"What Makes You Beautiful" premiered on BBC Radio 1 on 10 August 2011, and was released by Syco Music in Europe, Australia and New Zealand via digital download on 11 September 2011. A CD single was released in the United Kingdom on 12 September 2011, and followed in Australia and Germany on 25 November 2011 and 2 December 2011, respectively. In North America, the single was released in Canada via digital download on 31 January 2012. It was issued 14 February 2012 in the United States and was sent by Columbia Records to US contemporary hit radio (CHR) playlists on 28 February 2012.

For the North American release of Up All Night on 13 March 2012, Columbia Records executives used social media to shape the marketing campaign. Columbia Records co-chairman Steve Barnett and his team decided to reverse the usual pattern of releasing a single on radio. Instead, the label mounted a four-month marketing campaign aimed at building a fan base through social media before a single was ever released or played on the radio. The social media campaign asked fans to sign petitions and to enter video competitions to win a concert in their town. The campaign was a success as One Direction's Facebook followers in the United States rose from 40,000 to 400,000. As a result, "What Makes You Beautiful" sold more than 131,000 copies in its first week, even though it had yet to be played on the radio. Radio programmers were flooded with calls from fans. Johnny Wright, who managed New Kids on the Block, Backstreet Boys and 'N Sync, said: "Now they are calling the radio station, and the radio station is scratching its head, saying, "We don't even have that record yet". It's almost like the return of the Beatles. I call it hype, but it's positive hype because it's all real. It's not manufactured. No one paid these kids."

== Composition ==
"What Makes You Beautiful"
The song has a guitar-based chorus and riff

"What Makes You Beautiful" is a power pop song, with electropop influences. Running for 3 minutes and 23 seconds, the song is set in common time with a tempo of 125 beats per minute. Written in the key of E major, it follows the chord progression E–A–B; vocal elements range from the note of B_{2} to G♯_{4}. James C. McKinley Jr. of The New York Times compared its chord progression to "La Bamba". The opening guitar riff has been noted as similar to that of "Summer Nights" from the musical Grease and the vocal were identical to "Do-Re-Mi" from The Sound of Music. "What Makes You Beautiful" has a guitar-based chorus whose notes range from C to E; Digital Spy's Robert Copsey likened it to a cross between Pink's "Raise Your Glass" and McFly's "All About You". It also contains cowbell instrumentation, and the middle eight consists of an "oh na na na" hook. Lead vocals are performed by Harry Styles, Liam Payne and Zayn Malik.

== Critical reception ==
The song received generally positive reviews from music critics. Robert Copsey of Digital Spy gave "What Makes You Beautiful" four out of five stars, praising its catchy melody and summarising it as "adorable, completely innocent and bound to cause a stir amongst your mates". Zachary Houle of PopMatters called the song a "nice get-up-and-go dance number." Ailbhe Malone of NME commended the song's appeal to the teenage audience and its chord progression for being "simple enough to be played on an acoustic guitar at a house party." Newsround called it "fun, upbeat and incredibly catchy." AllMusic's Matthew Chisling called it an "effervescent and fresh tween love song", and chose it as one of the best tracks on Up All Night. Sophie Goddard from Cosmopolitan called the single "ridiculously catchy". Student's Jack Murray rated "What Makes You Beautiful" five out of five stars and called it "not only the best pop single of the year so far, but potentially of any X Factor contestant ever". Murray lauded the songwriting and light production. Tanner Stransky of Entertainment Weekly awarded "What Makes You Beautiful" a B+ grade, calling the song "shallow but crushworthy", writing that the song shows that boy bands are not dying out.

Jason Lipshutz of Billboard characterised it as "the real deal", regarding the song as "endlessly playable" as 'N Sync's "Bye Bye Bye". Lipshutz noted its "cheeky electro-pop twist". Stephanie Abrahams of TIME assessed, "The group takes cues from the boy bands of yesteryear with bubblegum lyrics about young love — "The way you flip your hair gets me overwhelmed" they croon in their breakout single – which any parent can get behind. That's a far cry from a typical Nicki Minaj verse." The Observer editor Kitty Empire wrote in an assessment, "With the exception of their persuasive No 1 single, "What Makes You Beautiful", their songs aren't wildly distinctive." "What Makes You Beautiful" won the BRIT Award for Best British Single at the 2012 Brit Awards, which was held on 21 February 2012. The song also won the Teen Choice Award for Choice Music: Love Song at the 2012 Teen Choice Awards. Newsround called the song "fun, upbeat and incredibly catchy" while commenting "there's no way these boys won't be a hit".

== Chart performance ==
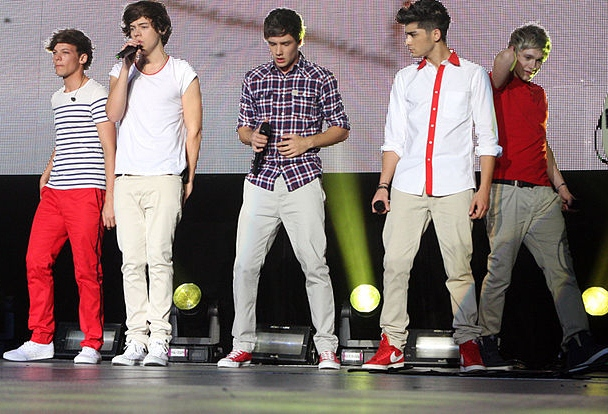
One Direction performing "What Makes You Beautiful" at their Up All Night Tour, 2012

"What Makes You Beautiful" performed considerably well worldwide, but especially so in the British Isles, debuting at number 1 on the Irish Singles Chart on 15 September 2011; its B-side, "Na Na Na" also entered at number 27. The single topped the chart for four consecutive weeks. "What Makes You Beautiful" became the fourteenth best-selling single of 2011 on the Irish Singles Chart. In the UK, "What Makes You Beautiful" received the highest ever number of pre-orders for a Sony Music Entertainment single. It entered the UK Singles Chart at number 1 on 18 September 2011, shifting 153,965 copies that week—the highest first-week UK sales for any song in 2011 at the time. "What Makes You Beautiful" also debuted at number 1 on the Scottish Singles Chart. "What Makes You Beautiful" was the 20th best-selling single of 2011, moving 540,000 copies, and was the 92nd best-selling single of the 21st century in the UK by May 2012. It has sold over 1,000,000 copies in the UK.

In Belgium, the song debuted at number 44 on both the Flemish Ultratop 50 and the Wallonian Ultratip; it peaked at numbers 8 and 19, respectively. Accumulating twenty-two weeks on the French Singles Chart, it debuted at number 83 and peaked at number 38. In Finland, the single debuted and peaked at number 20. On the top sixty Swedish Sverigetopplistan, the single debuted at number 49, peaked at number 29, and spent twenty-four weeks on that chart. It was certified quadruple platinum by the Swedish Recording Industry Association (GLF), denoting sales of 80,000 copies. "What Makes You Beautiful" debuted at number 15 and peaked at number 7 on the Australian Singles Chart. The single spent twenty-five weeks in the Australian Singles Chart top twenty. "What Makes You Beautiful" has been certified six times platinum by the Australian Recording Industry Association (ARIA), denoting sales of 420,000 units. "Na Na Na" also appeared on the Australian Singles Chart of 28 November 2011 at number 84. On the New Zealand Singles Chart, the single entered at number 16, and peaked at number 2 in its fourth and fifth weeks. The song spent eleven consecutive weeks in the chart's top ten. It was certified double platinum by the Recording Industry Association of New Zealand (RIANZ), denoting sales of 30,000 units.

The single debuted on the Canadian Hot 100 at number 9, while bowing at number 2 on the Canadian Hot Digital Songs Chart with 19,000 downloads sold, the biggest debut for a first time charted artist since the Stereos's "Summer Girl" entered at number two in June 2009. The single peaked at number 7 on the Canadian Hot 100 and has been certified quadruple platinum by Music Canada, denoting sales of 320,000 copies. In the United States, "What Makes You Beautiful" became the highest Billboard Hot 100 debut for a British act since 1998. On 3 March 2012, the single debuted on the Billboard Hot 100 at number 28, whilst bowing at number 12 on the Hot Digital Songs chart, selling 132,000 digital downloads in its first week. On the week ending 21 April 2012, "What Makes You Beautiful" peaked at number 4. As of 30 June 2012, the single had spent thirteen consecutive weeks in the Billboard Hot 100 top ten. The song also became a chart success on other Billboard charts, reaching the top five on the Mainstream Top 40, Adult Pop Songs, and Hot 100 Airplay charts, whilst topping the Hot Dance Club Songs chart. The track sold 3,881,000 copies in the United States in 2012, becoming the best-selling song by a boy band in digital history. The song was certified quadruple platinum by the Recording Industry Association of America (RIAA) on 21 February 2013, and it has sold 4.8 million copies in the US as of June 2016. "What Makes You Beautiful" has sold over 7 million copies worldwide.

Following Liam Payne's death in October 2024, the song saw a surge in sales and streams. The Official Charts Company showed "What Makes You Beautiful" place at number 47 on the UK Midweek Singles Chart. It entered the UK Singles Chart Top 100, on 25 October 2024, at number 23.

== Music video ==
The music video for "What Makes You Beautiful" was directed by John Urbano and produced by Stephenie Fernandez. Filmed over two days in July 2011, it opens with scenes of One Direction spending time on a Malibu, California, beach and driving an orange campervan. During the second verse, a group of three girls joins the band at the beach; in Styles' bridge solo, he intimately sings to one girl, Madison McMillin. During the final choruses, the band and girls sit around a fire, lighting sparklers and taking photographs. The music video for "What Makes You Beautiful" was filmed at Point Mugu beach, the same beach as the music video of Blink-182's song "All the Small Things".

On each of the five days preceding the video's premiere on 19 August 2011, One Direction posted a teaser trailer of the video online. Each teaser showed footage from the video and behind the scenes, and one member of the band announcing how many days were left until the video premiere.

The video was the fourth most-watched music video of 2011 in the UK on MUZU TV. The video won two MTV Video Music Awards for Best Pop Video and Most Share-Worthy Video, and earned the group the award for Best New Artist on 6 September 2012.

In November 2018, "What Makes You Beautiful" became the band's first music video to receive 1 billion views on YouTube. A 4K version of the music video was uploaded to the platform on 23 July 2020, as part of the band's tenth-anniversary celebrations. As of November 2024, the video had more than 1.5 billion views on YouTube.

== Live performances ==
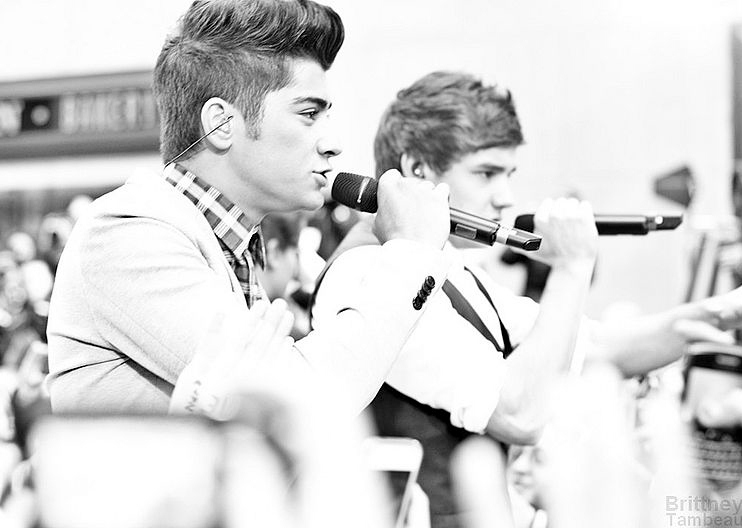
Malik and Payne performing "What Makes You Beautiful" at Rockefeller Center on 12 March 2012

One Direction performed "What Makes You Beautiful" for the first time on Red or Black? on 10 September 2011. The performance started with hosts Ant & Dec announcing that the band was supposedly running late for their appearance, and cut to a video of One Direction boarding a London Tube carriage full of fans, as the studio version of the song began playing. Each fan on the tube was given a numbered ticket. The band and fans disembarked the tube and made their way to the television studio, where the remainder of the song was sung live. After the song, Styles caught a numbered ticket raining onstage. The number corresponded to a ticket held by a fan from the tube; the colour of the fan's shirt was the correct answer for the Red or Black? challenge. The band performed "What Makes You Beautiful" after its B-side, "Na Na Na", at the BBC Radio 1 Teen Awards on 9 October 2011. The band also performed the song to open telethon Children in Need 2011 on 19 November 2011. After "Gotta Be You" and "One Thing", One Direction performed "What Makes You Beautiful" at Capital FM's Jingle Bell Ball on 4 December 2011, at The O_{2} Arena. They performed a medley of "She Makes Me Wanna" and "What Makes You Beautiful" with JLS on The X Factor's eighth series final on 10 December 2011. The group performed "One Thing" and "What Makes You Beautiful" on Dancing on Ice on 5 February 2012.

In Italy, the band performed the song at the 2012 Sanremo Music Festival on 14 February 2012. In France, they performed "What Makes You Beautiful" and "One Thing" on Le Grand Journal on 22 February 2012. In the United States, One Direction performed the song along with "More than This" and "One Thing" for the first time on The Today Show at Rockefeller Center on 12 March 2012. An estimated 15,000 fans descended on the plaza. Melissa Lonner, senior entertainment producer for The Today Show, said: "One Direction is relatively unknown with no hits yet. They basically exploded, and all the adults are saying, 'Who are these people, and how do they know about it?'". They also performed the song at the 2012 Kids' Choice Awards on 31 March 2012. One Direction performed "What Makes You Beautiful" and "One Thing" on the NBC comedy television show Saturday Night Live on 7 April 2012, and also appeared in a comedy sketch with Sofía Vergara. In Australia, they performed "One Thing" and "What Makes You Beautiful" at the 54th Logie Awards, where they also presented an award for "Most Popular New Female Talent" on 15 April 2012. On 12 August 2012, One Direction performed "What Makes You Beautiful" at the 2012 Summer Olympics closing ceremony in London, which represented the handover to Rio de Janeiro as the host of the 2016 Summer Olympics. It was included on the set list of the group's headlining sold-out show at Madison Square Garden on 3 December 2012. One Direction performed the song on two of their major concert tours: Up All Night Tour (2011–12) and Take Me Home Tour (2013). The song was also added to the set lists of the Where We Are Tour (2014) and On the Road Again Tour (2015). The second verse of the song had originally been sung by Malik. After Malik's departure, Payne took his verse. In 2017, Styles performed the song on his first solo tour. He also performed the song on his second tour.

== Cover versions ==
- The song was covered for American television series Glee by Kevin McHale, Chord Overstreet, Harry Shum Jr., Samuel Larsen, and Damian McGinty in the episode titled "Prom-asaurus". It was first aired on 8 May 2012, and is the 19th episode of the third season. Their characters Artie Abrams (McHale), Sam Evans (Overstreet), Mike Chang (Shum), Joe Hart (Larsen), and Rory Flanagan (McGinty) covered the song in the episode, performing a choreographed dance routine to it. Sarah Maloy of Billboard acknowledged, "Screaming girls and choreographed boy band moves are, of course, in no short supply." Maloy described Glee's version as "barely changing the sound or style of the original version." Erica Futterman of Rolling Stone wrote, "While One Direction's original manages to pack a pop punch, Glee's take kind of hits the mark. (Literally. The Glee boys prance across the stage in the same path as the U.K. heartthrobs.)" Futterman concluded that it was the fourth best performance of that episode. Glee's cover was released for digital download through the iTunes Store on 8 May 2012. It charted at numbers 93 and 163 on the Canadian Hot 100 and UK Singles Chart, respectively.
- In July 2012, the Piano Guys uploaded an instrumental piano version of the song on YouTube, which went viral.
- In 2013, The 1975 covered the song for a BBC Radio One Live Lounge performance.
- Chinese Mandopop band TFBoys covered in Chinese version《《青蛙也会变王子》》(The frog also can become Prince).
- Kelly Clarkson covered this song on the first season of her talk show The Kelly Clarkson Show, which aired on 10 October 2019.

== Track listing ==
Digital download and CD single

1. "What Makes You Beautiful" – 3:24
2. "Na Na Na" – 3:10

== Credits and personnel ==
"What Makes You Beautiful"

- Tom Coyne – mastering
- Carl Falk – writing, production, programming, instruments, guitar
- Serban Ghenea – mixing
- John Hanes – mix engineering
- Savan Kotecha – writing
- Phil Seaford – mix engineering assistance
- Rami Yacoub – writing, production, programming, instruments, bass

"Na Na Na"

- Dick Beetham – mastering
- Iain James – writing
- Savan Kotecha – writing
- Matt Lawrence – engineering
- Greg Marriot – engineering assistance
- James Murray – writing
- Matt Squire – writing, production, backing vocals, mixing
- Mustapha Omer – writing

== Charts ==
=== Weekly charts ===
Chart (2011–2012)	Peak position
Australia (ARIA)	7
Austria (Ö3 Austria Top 40)	28
Belgium (Ultratop 50 Flanders)	8
Belgium (Ultratop 50 Wallonia)	19
Brazil (Billboard Brasil Hot 100)	24
Brazil Hot Pop Songs	6
Canada Hot 100 (Billboard)	7
Czech Republic Airplay (ČNS IFPI)	13
Denmark (Tracklisten)	26
Euro Digital Song Sales (Billboard)	2
Finland (Suomen virallinen lista)	20
France (SNEP)	39
Germany (GfK)	40
Global Dance Tracks (Billboard)	24
Honduras (Honduras Top 50)	5
Ireland (IRMA)	1
Italy (FIMI)	41
Japan Hot 100 (Billboard)	3
Mexico (Billboard Mexican Airplay)	1
Netherlands (Single Top 100)	63
New Zealand (Recorded Music NZ)	2
Scottish Singles Sales (Official Charts)	1
Slovakia Airplay (ČNS IFPI)	42
South Korea International Chart (GAON)	71
Spain (Promusicae)	40
Sweden (Sverigetopplistan)	29
Switzerland (Schweizer Hitparade)	16
UK Singles (Official Charts)	1
UK Airplay (Music Week)	2
US Billboard Hot 100	4
US Adult Contemporary (Billboard)	8
US Adult Pop Airplay (Billboard)	5
US Dance Airplay (Billboard)	13
US Dance Club Songs (Billboard)	1
US Pop Airplay (Billboard)	3
US Rhythmic Airplay (Billboard)	33

2024 weekly chart performance for "What Makes You Beautiful"
Chart (2024)	Peak position
Global 200 (Billboard)	55
Philippines (Philippines Hot 100)	81

=== Year-end charts ===
Chart (2011)	Position
Australia (ARIA)	69
Ireland (IRMA)	14
New Zealand (Recorded Music NZ)	28
UK Singles (OCC)	20
UK Airplay (Music Week)	58

Chart (2012)	Position
Australia (ARIA)	17
Belgium (Ultratop Flanders)	69
Belgium (Ultratop Wallonia)	76
Brazil (Crowley)	14
Canada (Canadian Hot 100)	13
France (SNEP)	122
Japan (Japan Hot 100)	15
New Zealand (Recorded Music NZ)	28
Sweden (Sverigetopplistan)	62
Switzerland (Schweizer Hitparade)	66
Taiwan (Hito Radio)	46
UK Singles (OCC)	85
US Billboard Hot 100	10
US Adult Contemporary (Billboard)	15
US Adult Top 40 (Billboard)	23
US Mainstream Top 40 (Billboard)	15

Chart (2013)	Position
UK Singles (OCC)	182
US Streaming Songs (Billboard)	35

=== Decade-end charts ===
Chart (2010–2019)	Position
Australia (ARIA)	81

== Certifications ==
Region	Certification	Certified units/sales
Australia (ARIA)	13× Platinum	910,000^{‡}
Belgium (BRMA)	Gold	15,000^{*}
Canada (Music Canada)	8× Platinum	640,000^{‡}
Denmark (IFPI Danmark)	Gold	15,000^{^}
Germany (BVMI)	Gold	150,000^{‡}
Italy (FIMI)	Platinum	30,000^{*}
Japan (RIAJ)	Platinum	250,000^{*}
Mexico (AMPROFON)	3× Platinum	180,000^{‡}
New Zealand (RMNZ)	6× Platinum	180,000^{‡}
Norway (IFPI Norway)	7× Platinum	70,000^{*}
Spain (Promusicae)	Platinum	60,000^{‡}
Sweden (GLF)	4× Platinum	160,000^{‡}
Switzerland (IFPI Switzerland)	Platinum	30,000^{^}
United Kingdom (BPI)	4× Platinum	2,400,000^{‡}
United States (RIAA)	4× Platinum	4,888,000
Streaming
Denmark (IFPI Danmark)	2× Platinum	3,600,000^{†}
Japan (RIAJ)	Platinum	100,000,000^{†}
^{*} Sales figures based on certification alone.^{^} Shipments figures based on certification alone.^{‡} Sales+streaming figures based on certification alone.^{†} Streaming-only figures based on certification alone.

== Release history ==
Region	Date	Format	Label
Australia	11 September 2011	Digital download	Syco Music
Belgium	11 September 2011	Digital download	Syco Music
Czech Republic	11 September 2011	Digital download	Syco Music
Denmark	11 September 2011	Digital download	Syco Music
Finland	11 September 2011	Digital download	Syco Music
France	11 September 2011	Digital download	Syco Music
Germany	11 September 2011	Digital download	Syco Music
Ireland	11 September 2011	Digital download	Syco Music
Italy	11 September 2011	Digital download	Syco Music
Netherlands	11 September 2011	Digital download	Syco Music
New Zealand	11 September 2011	Digital download	Syco Music
Norway	11 September 2011	Digital download	Syco Music
Portugal	11 September 2011	Digital download	Syco Music
Romania	11 September 2011	Digital download	Syco Music
Spain	11 September 2011	Digital download	Syco Music
Sweden	11 September 2011	Digital download	Syco Music
Switzerland	11 September 2011	Digital download	Syco Music
United Kingdom	11 September 2011	Digital download	Syco Music
United Kingdom	12 September 2011	CD single	Syco Music
Australia	4 October 2011	Contemporary hit radio	Syco Music
Australia	25 November 2011	CD single	Syco Music
Germany	2 December 2011	CD single	Syco Music
Canada	31 January 2012	Digital download	Columbia Records
United States	14 February 2012	Digital download	Columbia Records
United States	28 February 2012	Contemporary hit radio	Columbia Records

== See also ==
- List of best-selling singles in Australia
- List of number-one dance singles of 2012 (U.S.)
- List of UK Singles Chart number ones of the 2010s
- List of million-selling singles in the United Kingdom
