= Chris Eaton =

Chris Eaton may refer to:

- Chris Eaton (tennis) (born 1987), British tennis player
- Chris Eaton (UK musician) (born 1958), contemporary Christian singer-songwriter
- Chris Eaton (Canadian musician) (born 1971), indie rock musician and author
- Chris Eaton (police officer) (born 1952), Australian police officer most notable as an investigator of sports betting scams, especially in association football
- Chris Eaton (politician) (born 1954), American politician
- Chris Eaton (rugby union) (born 1984), New Zealand rugby union player
