= The Moneen DVD: It All Started with a Red Stripe =

The .moneen. DVD: It All Started with a Red Stripe

Video by Moneen
- Released: May 13, 2008
- Recorded: 2001–2007; Various locations Live in Toronto, ON
- Genre: Indie rock
- Length: 196:42
- Label: Vagrant Records
- Producer: Alex Liu; Lisa Logutenkow; Jason Smith; Moneen

The Moneen DVD: It All Started with a Red Stripe is the first official DVD released by Moneen, an Indie rock band based in Brampton, Ontario, Canada. It was released in Canada and the United States on May 13, 2008. The DVD has four different sections: a documentary, a live performance, tour diaries and music videos.

== The start to this may be the end to another ==
The Start to this May be the End to Another is a documentary about Moneen. The film mainly focuses on the pre-production process of The Red Tree album. The band moves into a house in Baltimore, Maryland, to work on pre-production with the producer Brian McTernan. The band struggles to develop demos to send to Vagrant Records in preparation for recording a new album. Video clips from the past are interspersed throughout the film to show how the band had developed until pre-production of The Red Tree. The film can also be watched with all the band members providing commentary.

== Live at The Mod Club ==
The second section of the DVD consists of a live performance by Moneen at The Mod Club Theatre in Toronto on May 10, 2007. Nine songs from the performance are included. Three songs from the performance are not included on the DVD, along with any talking that occurred between songs.

== Tour diaries ==
There are two separate sections of tour journals: U.S. tour diaries and Canadian tour diaries. These videos were previously released on the Internet while Moneen was on these tours. The videos are not really diaries, but more just videos showing what the band does for fun on tour, and how they interact with fans.

== Music videos ==
Five music videos are included on the DVD. Four of these videos had previously been in rotation at music television stations. The fifth video is a video made and directed by Kenny Bridges for "The Song I Swore to Never Sing".

== DVD track listing ==
1. The Start To This May Be The End To Another (72:39)
2. Live at The Mod Club
  1. Don't Ever Tell Locke What He Can't Do (3:34)
  2. If Tragedy's Appealing, The Disaster's An Addiction (4:41)
  3. Start Angry...End Mad (5:21)
  4. There Are A Million Reasons For Why This May Not Work... And Just One Good One For Why It Will (7:41)
  5. The Day No One Needed To Know (6:37)
  6. Tonight, I'm Gone (6:32)
  7. His Own Anomaly (6:39)
  8. The Passing Of America (11:45)
  9. Bonus - The Song I Swore To Never Sing (3:21)
3. Tour Diaries
  1. U.S. Tour Diaries (31:47)
    1. Handball
    2. Everything Explodes
    3. Dance Party Remix
    4. Fun in the U.S.A.
    5. Pizza
    6. Halloween
    7. Kenny Dance
    8. Friends for Life
    9. Moneen Police
    10. Parking Lot
    11. Hippy Fight
    12. Radio
    13. Poker Smash
    14. Sandhill
    15. Spinning Plate of Death Gang
    16. Three Notes at Once
  2. Canadian Tour Diaries (18:11)
    1. A Short Time Ago in An RV Soon to be Far Away...
    2. Clearing the Poop-chute
    3. .moneen.: The Gathering
    4. Fun with Balls
    5. Peter Sings the Hits
    6. Challenge!
4. Music Videos
  1. If Tragedy's Appealing, Then Disaster's An Addiction
  2. Don't Ever Tell Locke What He Can't Do
  3. The Song I Swore to Never Sing
  4. Are We Really Happy with who We Are Right Now?
  5. Start Angry, End Mad

== Personnel ==
=== The start to this may be the end to another ===
- Filmed, directed, and edited by Alex Liu
- Produced by Alex Liu, Lisa Logutenkow, and Jason Smith
- Executive producer: George Stromboulopoulos
- Graphics and titles by Jason Ford
- Post-production audio mix by Adrian Mottram, Company X Audio

=== Live concert ===
- Filmed at The Mod Club Theatre in Toronto on May 10, 2007
- Directed and edited by Greg Benedetto
- Shot by Shaun Axani, Aaron Champion, Peter Lehman, and Pat Moore
- Audio mixed by Greg Dawson, BWC Studios
- Live audio recording by 2V and Steve Lewin
- Guitar tech, keyboards, and samples by Haris Cehajic

=== Tour journals ===
- Shot by Haris Cehajic, Greg Benedetto, and Moneen
- Edited by Kenny Bridges and Greg Benedetto
- Selected music recorded by Kenny Bridges
