= Chris Eaton (Canadian musician) =

- Born: 1971 (age 54–55); Moncton, New Brunswick, Canada
- Genre: Indie rock
- Occupations: Singer-songwriter novelist

Chris Eaton (born 1971) is the founder and lead vocalist of Toronto-based indie rock band Rock Plaza Central, as well as a novelist.

== Music career ==
Eaton began as a solo artist, with various musicians backing him, often using musical improvisation. In 2003, the current line-up of Rock Plaza Central formed during such a gig in Toronto, and they recorded their first album in that incarnation only a month later. Their second album, Are We Not Horses, was favorably reviewed by influential music journal Pitchfork Media.

== Writing career ==
Eaton is also a published author. His first novel The Inactivist (2003), has been required reading on two university courses at McGill University in Montreal, as well as a graduate English course at the University of South Alabama. His second novel, The Grammar Architect (2006), is a "cover" of a Thomas Hardy book, A Pair of Blue Eyes, using some of the plot, imagery, themes and even some passages of the original and creating something new and personal out of that.

Letters To Thomas Pynchon is a short fiction collection published as an eBook with Joyland: A hub for short fiction in 2010.

In 2013, Eaton published his third novel called Chris Eaton, a Biography with Book*hug Press. Critical response was generally quite positive, with profiles in prominent national media like the National Post and Toronto Star. Martin Patriquin of Maclean's wrote "Nabokov could write about his back porch and make it interesting; Chris Eaton does much the same with his fellow Chris Eatons" and The Winnipeg Review, while critical of the confusion of the conceit, praised the prose: "It's work, in other words, but Eaton's language is so good, managing that easygoing poetry that feels made from the thoughts of people who don't know they're being written, that you forgive him for it. Chris Eaton is threaded with so much of this kind of silver that it feels like he must just open the tap and let it pour." The novel was included in many year-end lists, including the Toronto Star, Quill & Quire and Quarterly Conversation while also being included in Steven Moore's The Novel: an Alternative History, Volume 2.

Eaton's fourth novel, Symphony No. 3, based on the life of composer Camille Saint-Saëns, was published in 2019 by Book*hug Press and was listed as a finalist for the 2020 New Brunswick Book Awards. The New York critic David Gutowski called it "one of the year's finest novels, symphonic in structure and spectacular on a sentence level." Quill and Quire reviewer José Teodoro described the novel's narrative voice as one that is "capable of delivering an unrelenting battery of fireworks that leaves the reader dazzled and exhausted...It’s intended as neither mere praise nor outright dismissal to state that novels are rarely infused with this combination of piercing intelligence and flights of tedium." Toronto Star reviewer Brett Josef Grubisic wrote that the novel reminded him of the flamboyant, American musician Liberace. "Tasty in small bites and impressive as an antic literary performance, the novel’s structure gradually buckles under the sheer mass of extravagant decoration. As with Liberace’s mirror walls etched with Aubrey Beardsley drawings, sensory overload produces diminishing returns." Globe and Mail reviewer Jade Colbert called it "a dense text, and it reproduces the prejudices of fin de siècle Europe, which can make for difficult reading, though there are also sections when this novel opens up and sings."
