= Are We Really Happy with Who We Are Right Now? =

Are We Really Happy With Who We Are Right Now?

Studio album by Moneen
- Released: June 17, 2003
- Recorded: Audio International, Ojai, California; The Eye Socket, Venice, California
- Genres: Indie rock; emo
- Length: 51:16
- Label: Vagrant Records/Smallman Records (in Canada)
- Producer: Trever Keith

Moneen chronology
| The Theory of Harmonial Value (2001) | Are We Really Happy With Who We Are Right Now? (2003) | The Switcheroo Series: Burning Down The Pine Room (2005) |

Professional ratings
Review scores
| Source | Rating |
|---|---|
| AllMusic | 3/5 stars |
| Alternative Press | 3/5 |
| Exclaim! | favorable |
| PopMatters | mixed |
| Punknews.org | 4/5 stars |
| Tiny Mix Tapes | 2.5/5 stars |

Are We Really Happy With Who We Are Right Now? is the second full-length album by the rock band Moneen.

== Track listing ==
All tracks are written by Moneen.

| No. | Title | Length |
|---|---|---|
| 1. | "Are We Really Happy With Who We Are Right Now?" | 3:45 |
| 2. | "Start Angry...End Mad" | 4:43 |
| 3. | "To Say Something That Means Nothing To Anyone At All" | 5:20 |
| 4. | "With This Song I Will Destroy Myself" | 5:02 |
| 5. | "Closing My Eyes Won't Help Me Leave" | 5:59 |
| 6. | "I Have Never Done Anything For Anyone That Was Not For Me As Well" | 3:56 |
| 7. | "How To Live With The Thought That Sometimes Life Ends" | 4:44 |
| 8. | "Life's Just Too Short Little Ndugu" | 4:15 |
| 9. | "Thoughts Weigh Heavy...Don't Get Drowned In The Weight Of It All" | 4:32 |
| 10. | "The Last Song I Will Ever Want To Sing" | 9:05 |
| Total length: | | 51:16 |

== Personnel ==
- Kenny Bridges – vocals, guitar, design, layout
- Erik Hughes – bass guitar, additional vocals
- Chris Hughes – guitar, additional vocals
- Peter Krpan – drums
- Trever Keith – production, additional vocals
- Chad Blinman – recording, mixing, "string sounds"
- Joe Gastwirt – mastering
- Erich Gobel – mixing assistant
- Lisa Logutenkow – additional vocals
- Keath Moon – layout, design
- Matt Daley – additional artwork
