= Saying Something You Have Already Said Before: A Quiet Side of Moneen =

EP by Moneen
- Released: October 10, 2006 (Digital); November 16, 2006
- Recorded: November 2005 – September 2006
- Genre: Acoustic rock
- Length: 20:02
- Label: Vagrant Records
- Producer: Brian McTernan; Kenny Bridges; Moneen; Greg Dawson

Moneen chronology
The Red Tree (2006)	Saying Something You Have Already Said Before: A Quiet Side of Moneen (2006)	Hold That Sound EP (2009)

Professional ratings
Review scores
Source	Rating
AbsolutePunk.net	94%

Saying Something You Have Already Said Before: A Quiet Side of Moneen is an EP/DVD by the rock band Moneen. The CD side of the disc includes four acoustic versions of songs that were on The Red Tree as well as a previously unreleased song. The DVD side of the disc includes live footage of four songs performed by Moneen during a show at The Opera House in Toronto, Ontario in June 2006.

== Track listing ==
=== CD Side ===
All tracks are written by Moneen

No.	Title	Length
1.	"Prepare Yourself... The Worst Is Yet To Come" (Previously Unreleased)	4:02
2.	"This Is All Bigger Than Me" (Acoustic)	3:48
3.	"There Are A Million Reasons For Why This May Not Work... And Just One For Why It Will" (Acoustic)	5:12
4.	"The East Has Stolen What The West May Want" (Acoustic)	3:37
5.	"The Song I Swore To Never Sing" (Acoustic)	3:25
Total length:		20:02

=== DVD Side ===
No.	Title	Length
1.	"Don't Ever Tell Locke What He Can't Do"
2.	"If Tragedy's Appealing, Then Disaster's An Addiction"
3.	"Are We Really Happy With Who We Are Right Now?"
4.	"This Is All Bigger Than Me"
