= Into the New =

Studio album by Vallejo
- Released: August 22, 2000
- Genre: Rock/Latin
- Length: 49:45
- Label: Sony, Epic Records
- Producer: A. J. Vallejo and Michael Panepento

Vallejo chronology
Beautiful Life (1998)	Into the New (2000)	Stereo (album) (2002)

Professional ratings
Review scores
Source	Rating
AllMusic	3/5 stars
The Austin Chronicle	3/4 stars

Into the New is a studio album by the American band Vallejo, released in 2000.

It was the band's first album after signing with Emilio Estefan.

== Critical reception ==
The Austin Chronicle wrote that it's "not that Vallejo don't have their own sound. They do. One that sounds like 30 years of classic rock radio." Texas Monthly thought that "the hooks are heavy, the power ballads are surprisingly sensitive, and the Latin percussion and Santana-inspired workouts are fluid and funky." The Morning Call wrote that "the tepid yowling, forced funkiness, grunge-lite posturing and jam-band jive that pockmarks Into The New will make you want to kick sand in Vallejo's face."

== Track listing ==
All songs composed by A.J. Vallejo, Alejandro Vallejo and Omar Vallejo except where specified

1. "Into the New" (Bruce Castleberry, A.J. Vallejo, Alejandro Vallejo, O. Vallejo) – 4:26
2. "Over You" (A.J. Vallejo) – 3:11
3. "Someway" – 3:58
4. "I Go On" – 3:47
5. "La Familia" – 3:37
6. "Modern Day Slave" (O. Vallejo, Castleberry, Donn Robinson, A.J. Vallejo, Alejandro Vallejo) – 4:26
7. "The Beginning" – 3:51
8. "Classico" – 3:21
9. "Back in the Day" (Alejandro Vallejo, O. Vallejo) – 3:24
10. "Dia de Muerto" – 4:35
11. "El Matador" – 4:13
12. "Let It Slide" – 6:52
13. "Out With The Old" - 1:43* (Hidden Track)
