= Vallejo (band) =

American rock band

- Origin: El Campo, Texas; Austin, Texas, U.S. (since 1995)
- Genres: Alternative rock; indie rock; pop rock; Latin rock
- Years active: 1991–present
- Labels: TVT Records; Epic Records; Sony Records; VMG
- Members: A.J. Vallejo; Alejandro Vallejo; Omar Vallejo; Bruce Castleberry; Alex Geismar

Vallejo is an American rock band founded by three brothers, AJ Vallejo (eldest twin), Alex Vallejo (younger twin) and Omar Vallejo (youngest brother), in Austin, Texas. The Vallejo brothers were born in El Campo, Texas and grew up there. Later, during their pre-teen years they moved to Alabaster, Alabama, a suburb of Birmingham. The band has released 12 full-length albums, starting in 1991 with their self-titled debut Sins on Chapel Lane, an indie Birmingham label which is defunct.

== Background ==
Not long after their move in January 1995 to Austin, the group was signed to a multi-album and exclusive co-publishing deal to Chicago Records' Bobby Francavillo, with Steve Peck as the debut album's producer. Gaining a good amount of active rock radio airplay from their 1997 debut album "1969" featuring singles "Boogieman" and "Just Another Day", they signed a major distribution and marketing deal with TVT Records in New York, where the debut album was re-released - receiving rave reviews opening doors for Vallejo who went on to tour nationwide becoming a 'dangerous live act' as described by AustinLive. The followup to "1969", Beautiful Life, engineered, produced, and mixed by Neil King, was recorded at Record Plant in Sausalito, California and released in 1998. Now on imi/TVT, the album was received with less enthusiastic radio response resulting in TVT's decision to pull back promotion after a timid reaction to the single released by the band with Beastie Boys' DJ Hurricane. Bittersweet perhaps that this single, 'Snake In The Grass' would later resurface a decade later on two episodes of HBO's hit-series True Blood to much renewed airplay worldwide.

After catching a High End Lighting showcase in Orlando, Florida, by Vallejo at the House of Blues, Miami producer Emilio Estefan immediately signed Vallejo and Into the New was released by Sony in 2000. The album had mixed reviews but did well on rock charts and the band was invited on nationwide tours by Stone Temple Pilots, Linkin Park, Fuel, Disturbed, Blues Traveler, Matchbox Twenty, and The Black Crowes. Prior to releasing a second single to national radio, an unfortunate one-two combo of bad luck happened to Vallejo with the leadership of the Sony label changing and weeks later the world-stopping 9/11 event. Sony cut half of the artist roster with Vallejo on the list halfway into their summer tour. The weary brothers and band honored their remaining dates and headed home strung out and drained spending over a year tangled in legal battles.

In 2002, as free agents, Vallejo launched their own label VMG releasing Stereo, to overwhelming positive reviews becoming what many know as the Vallejo fan favorite. During the next decade, the band released albums to their loyal fanbase: 2004's trilogy-archive-releases: Black Sky, Leftovers, and Steamboat Live 97, Acousta (2006), Thicker Than Water (2008), and Brothers Brew (2014). Shortly after the release of Brothers Brew sources said that artistic differences and/or a bit of inevitable burnout from two decades of nonstop touring becoming the main reason for the Vallejo brothers' gradual transition from touring artists to producers with a seemingly effective presence in the music industry. AJ Vallejo won Austin Chronicle's Guitar Player of the Year in 2016 and Producer of the Year three years in a row in 2014-2015-2016. He launched indie label 10X Music Group and continued with both Bruce Castleberry on guitar and Alex Geismar on drums to perform as a roots-rock group, Brodie Lane. Alex Vallejo became the director of Austin's School of Rock facilities, co-producer at EPS, and the manager at Austin Music Foundation. Omar Vallejo opened 512 Studios in Austin winning Austin Chronicle's Producer and Studio of the Year in 2018-2019.

In 2021, after a seven year recording hiatus, Vallejo released Amigos on their VMG label, an album composed of collaborations with Texas staples and Grammy artists including Flaco Jimenez, Ray Benson, Dale Watson, Grupo Fantasma, and Gina Chavez to name a few.

== Members ==
=== Current members ===
- A.J. Vallejo – lead vocal/guitar
- Alejandro Vallejo – drums
- Omar Vallejo – bass guitar/backing vocals
- Bruce Castleberry – guitar/backing vocals
- Alex Geismar – percussion/backing vocals

=== Former members ===
- Michael Panepanto – percussion
- Steve Ramos – percussion
- James "Diego" Simmons – percussion
- Heath Clark – guitar
- Jeff Hartsough – percussion
- Angel Ferrer – guitar
- Zach Baker – guitar

== Discography ==
=== Studio albums ===
Year	Title	Label
1994	Sins	VMG
1997	Vallejo	TVT Records
1998	Beautiful Life	TVT Records
2000	Into the New	Sony Records
2002	Stereo	VMG
2003	Black Sky	VMG
2003	Steamboat Live '97	VMG
2005	Leftovers	VMG
2008	Thicker Than Water	Quadra Entertainment / VMG
2010	Acousta	VMG
2012	Brother's Brew	VMG

=== EP ===
Year	Title	Label
2009	Temporary Thing	Quadra Entertainment / VMG

=== Non-album tracks ===
Year	Track	Source
1996	"Against the Grain/Gypsy Queen" live – 7:13	From the KLBJ Local Licks Live '95 album
1998	"Forever (Is a Long Time)" live (A.J. Vallejo, Alejandro Vallejo, Bruce Castleberry) – 4:33	From the KLBJ Local Licks Live '97 album
1999	"Feliz Navidad" – 3:47	From the KLBJ Local Licks: Yule Rock! album
2001	"La Familia" live (A.J. Vallejo, Alejandro Vallejo, Omar Vallejo) – 5:55	From the KLBJ Local Licks Live XII album
2002	"I Go On" live (A.J. Vallejo, Alejandro Vallejo, Omar Vallejo) – 4:18	From the KLBJ Local Licks Live 13 album
2007	"Move On" – 3:09	From the INsite Austin magazine This Is INsite Austin Music I album
2008	"Sweet Maria" – 3:36	From the Austin Latino Music Association Austin Music Mezcla 2008 album

== See also ==
- Music of Austin
