= Smaller Chairs for the Early 1900s =

EP by Moneen
- Released: 2000
- Recorded: Unknown
- Genre: Emo
- Length: 19:57
- Label: Smallman Records

Moneen chronology
| Smaller Chairs for the Early 1900s (2000) | The Theory of Harmonial Value (2001) |

Smaller Chairs for the Early 1900s is the first release by the rock band Moneen.

== Track listing ==
All tracks are written by Moneen.

| No. | Title | Length |
|---|---|---|
| 1. | "How Many Other Girls Are There In The World Anyway?" | 4:02 |
| 2. | "The Wrath of the Donkey Remix" | 5:24 |
| 3. | "The Passing of America" (Demo) | 4:37 |
| 4. | "This Year I've Had Enough" | 5:55 |
| Total length: | | 19:57 |
