= The Switcheroo Series: Alexisonfire vs. Moneen =

EP by Alexisonfire and Moneen
- Released: October 31, 2005
- Recorded: Silo Studios (Alexisonfire), BWC Studios (Moneen)
- Genres: Post-hardcore; indie rock
- Length: 28:55
- Labels: Dine Alone; Vagrant
- Producers: Alexisonfire; Moneen

Alexisonfire chronology
Watch Out! (2004)	The Switcheroo Series: Alexisonfire vs. Moneen (2005)	Crisis (2006)

Moneen chronology
Are We Really Happy with Who We Are Right Now? (2003)	The Switcheroo Series: Alexisonfire vs. Moneen (2005)	The Red Tree (2006)

The Switcheroo Series: Alexisonfire vs. Moneen is an EP released by the post-hardcore band Alexisonfire and indie rock band Moneen. It has been the first of only two releases in the Switcheroo series from Dine Alone Records. In the United States, Moneen's label, Vagrant Records, released the split EP on November 22, 2005, but titled the release "Alexisonfire/Moneen Split", this was because The Switcheroo Series is an EP series by Dine Alone Records, not Vagrant Records. Nine months after the US release of the split EP, Alexisonfire released Crisis on Vagrant Records, after completing contract terms with former United States label Equal Vision Records.

This album featured Alexisonfire covering two songs originally by Moneen and vice versa. Each band also contributed a third, original track. This CD is the first to feature new Alexisonfire drummer Jordan Hastings, who replaced original drummer Jesse Ingelevics.

== Track listing ==
No.	Title	Artist	Length
1.	"Passing Out in America" (cover of Moneen's "The Passing of America")	Alexisonfire	4:00
2.	"Accidents Are on Purpose" (cover of Alexisonfire's "Accidents")	Moneen	5:40
3.	"Tonight, I am Going to Wash the Hippy" (cover of Moneen's "Tonight, I'm Gone...")	Alexisonfire	5:47
4.	"Sharks in Danger" (cover of Alexisonfire's "Sharks And Danger")	Moneen	4:46
5.	"Bleed and Blister (version two)" (original track)	Moneen	5:03
6.	"Charlie Sheen vs. Henry Rollins" (original track)	Alexisonfire	3:39
Total length:			28:55

== Personnel ==
Alexisonfire

- George Pettit – vocals
- Dallas Green – guitar, vocals
- Wade MacNeil – guitar, vocals
- Chris Steele – bass
- "Rat Beard" – drums
- Mastered by Brett Zilahi
- Recorded and mixed by "Juice"
- Produced by Alexisonfire and "Juice"

Moneen

- Erik Hughes – bass, backing vocals
- Kenny Bridges – guitar, lead vocals
- Chris "Hippy" Hughes – guitar, backing vocals
- Peter Krpan – drums
- Mastered by Brett Zilahi
- Recorded and mixed by Greg Dawson
- Produced by Moneen and Greg Dawson
