= The World I Want to Leave Behind =

Studio album by Moneen
- Released: September 15, 2009
- Recorded: December 2008 – February 2009 at Metalworks Studios in Mississauga, Ontario
- Genre: Indie rock
- Length: 44:27
- Label: Dine Alone
- Producer: David Botrill, Brian Moncartz

Moneen chronology
Hold That Sound EP (2009)	The World I Want to Leave Behind (2009)

Professional ratings
Review scores
Source	Rating
AbsolutePunk	(80%)
Allmusic	3.5/5 stars

The World I Want to Leave Behind is the fourth studio album by the Canadian indie-rock band Moneen. It was released on September 15, 2009, through Dine Alone Records in Canada, and through Vagrant Records in the US.

== Recording and production ==
Moneen started writing for The World I Want to Leave Behind in early 2008. In March 2008, drummer Peter Krpan announced his departure from the band and was quickly replaced by Steve Nunnaro. Krpan continued making music as a solo project called One Grand Canyon shortly thereafter. By this time, Moneen was already "nine songs into writing [their] next record." Moneen continued writing songs throughout 2008 in lead singer Kenny Bridges' basement for a demo to be given to various producers. The band considered working again with Brian McTernan who had previously produced Moneen's 2006 album The Red Tree. The band entered the studio in December 2008 with producers David Bottrill and Brian Moncarz.

Bridges described working on The World I Want to Leave Behind, stating "we wanted to create a record that was us, but at the same time something completely different than we have done before. We pushed ourselves harder than ever for this. We knew there was no way we could fool around with these songs. They were too important for us."

== Track listing ==
All tracks are written by Moneen.

No.	Title	Length
1.	"The World I Want To Leave Behind"	1:57
2.	"Hold That Sound"	3:18
3.	"Great Escape"	3:13
4.	"Believe"	3:31
5.	"Redefine"	3:26
6.	"The Way"	4:18
7.	"The Long Count"	3:53
8.	"The Monument"	2:42
9.	"Waterfalls"	3:45
10.	"Red Eyes"	4:10
11.	"Lighters"	4:10
12.	"The Glasshouse"	6:10
13.	"Dark & Ugly (iTunes and Vinyl Exclusive)"	4:11
14.	"Angels (iTunes Exclusive)"	3:49
Total length:		52:27

== Personnel ==
- Erik Hughes – bass guitar, vocals
- Kenny Bridges – vocals, guitar
- Chris "Hippy" Hughes – guitar, vocals
- Steve Nunnaro – drums, percussion
- Haris Cehajic – keyboards, guitar
- Produced by Brian Moncarz and David Bottrill
