= The Theory of Harmonial Value =

Studio album by Moneen
- Released: August 7, 2001
- Recorded: January 2001, Chemical Sound, Toronto, Ontario, Canada
- Genre: Emo
- Length: 58:40
- Label: Smallman Records
- Producer: Greg Dawson and Moneen

Moneen chronology
Smaller Chairs for the Early 1900s (2000)	The Theory of Harmonial Value (2001)	Are We Really Happy with Who We Are Right Now? (2003)

Professional ratings
Review scores
Source	Rating
Allmusic	link

The Theory of Harmonial Value is the second release by the rock band Moneen. This is also their first full-length album. The album is named after the papers of Dr. Lozlo Pronowski, a fictional scientist created by the band. At the end of the track, "The Passing of America", an instrumental demo version of "Closing My Eyes Won't Help Me Leave" can be heard, which was later included on "Are We Really Happy With Who We Are Right Now".

== Track listing ==
All tracks are written by Moneen

No.	Title	Length
1.	"The Start to This May Be the End to Another"	6:09
2.	"A Realization of How It's Always Been"	4:27
3.	"What Did You Say?...I'm Sorry My Eyes Are on Fire"	5:42
4.	"Half Empty? Half Full? I Never Got a Glass to Start With"	4:17
5.	"What the Weatherman Forgot to Tell You"	4:52
6.	"No Better Way to Show Your Love Than a Set of Broken Legs"	4:02
7.	"Why Bother Wondering When Wondering's All You Got"	3:55
8.	"The Passing of America"	6:53
9.	"I Wish I Was There to See the Way It Was Supposed to Be"	6:00
10.	"Tonight, I'm Gone..."	12:27
Total length:		58:40
