= Ubiquitous Synergy Seeker =

Canadian musical duo

USS
- Also known as: Ubiquitous Synergy Seeker
- Origin: Toronto, Canada
- Genres: Alternative rock; drum and bass; electronica; indie rock
- Years active: 2004–2022; 2025–present
- Label: Coalition Music
- Members: Ash Buchholz; Jason "Human Kebab" Parsons
- Website: ussmusic.com

USS (Ubiquitous Synergy Seeker) are an alternative rock musical duo from Toronto, Canada. It is composed of vocalist and guitarist Ashley Buchholz (aka Ash Boo-Schultz) and turntablist/hype man Jason "Human Kebab" Parsons.

The band's sound is a mixture of drum and bass beats, grunge-like guitar riffs, and 2-step rhythms. "We like to call what we do the campfire after-party", Ash Buchholz has said; "It's like you're at Nirvana Unplugged but there's a drum and bass party and glow sticks all around you." The duo announced their split in 2021 and performed their final show on June 11, 2022. They reunited in 2025.

== History ==
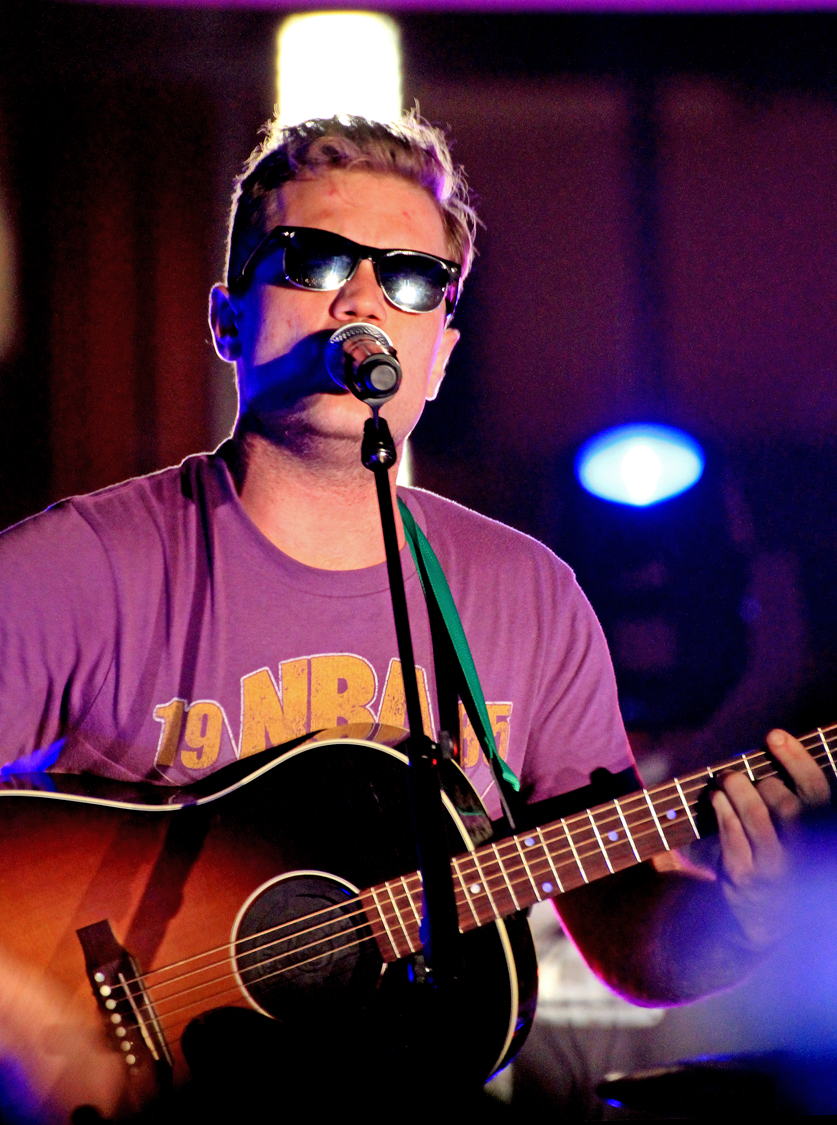
Ashley Buchholz of USS

=== Formation and first release: 2004–2008 ===
USS hails from the Greater Toronto Area, Buchholz being from the city of Markham and Parsons from the adjacent town of Stouffville. They met in 2004 while stocking the beer fridge and discussing music when they worked at a golf course. The pair hit it off instantly. A few months later, Buchholz's sister was looking for someone to DJ at her upcoming wedding and Parsons was suggested for the job. According to Buchholz, "It was love at first scratch", and he later moved into Parsons' parents' basement to begin experimenting musically.

The band's name came about when Buchholz sketched out a map of exactly who he wanted to be in life. At the top, he wrote, "Ubiquitous Synergy Seeker". Although this title was to become the band's moniker, the duo says that the name is for everyone: "It's singular — it's the title of a characteristic, not the title of two guys", Buchholz said.

By July 2008, the two began to perform live, and they released their first independent EP, Welding the C:/ (pronounced "Welding the C Drive") later that same month. The band then parted ways to pursue different avenues; Parsons travelled to Alberta to work on an oil pipeline and Buchholz went to the US on a pilgrimage. A friend of Parsons' later called him to say that Toronto radio station 102.1 The Edge had begun playing their first single, "Hollowpoint Sniper Hyperbole". The duo then returned to Toronto to shoot a video for the song, which was later added to the MuchMusic channel.

=== Questamation: 2009–2011 ===
In March 2009, USS released their first full-length album, Questamation, through their independent label, Smashing World Records. For the recording, the duo teamed up with Matthew Von Wagner (Crystal Castles, Alpha Galates) for production and engineering, while Chris Davies and Charles Topping 'aided musically'. Music engineer Bob Ludwig was recruited to master the original album in Portland, Maine. James Black of Finger Eleven is featured playing guitar on "P.S. I Can Change". On March 14, they won the award for Favourite Group/Duo at the CMW Indie Awards in Toronto. During their performance, the duo lit up the stage with a high-energy set, complete with handstands and full-size cardboard cutouts of Barack Obama and Albert Einstein.

In November, they supported illScarlett on the Canadian leg of their 1UP! Tour.

Shortly after the 2010 Haiti earthquake, various musicians from the Toronto area came together on February 2, 2010, at The Sound Academy, for the 102.1 The Edge-sponsored Toronto Plays For Haiti benefit. USS headlined the event, alongside Choclair, The Salads, Die Mannequin, The Trews, and Moneen. That evening, on impulse, Human Kebab played DJ to Canadian hip hop artist Maestro Fresh Wes.

In March and April, the band embarked on their Highway to Health tour. USS travelled from Barrie to British Columbia with The Stables, a Durham Region band along for the ride as direct support.

USS brought home their second consecutive COCA Award (Canadian Organization of Campus Activities) for Emerging Artist, (Winner of Emerging Artist Award 2009/2010), on June 25, 2010.

In September, Smirnoff launched their "Be There" campaign for the Nightlife Exchange Project. The countries that participated were Canada, United States, the UK, Argentina, Australia, Brazil, Germany, India, Ireland, Lebanon, Poland, South Africa, Thailand, and Venezuela. USS were named as the Canadian curators, to deliver Canadian nightlife to India. In October, the duo flew to Mumbai for the campaign.

In December, USS released the track "Mavericks", a collaboration with Canadian fiddler Ashley MacIsaac. The single's lyrics reference surfer Jeff Clark.

USS earned two spots on 102.1 The Edge's top songs of 2010, with "Anti-Venom" at No. 26 and "3 Purple Butterflies" at No. 74.

The 2011 soundtrack to Major League Baseball 2K11 (MLB 2K11), released by 2K Sports, single "Anti-Venom" from Questamation. It was also on the Nintendo Wii and 3DS version soundtrack to Need for Speed: The Run, released by EA Black Box and Firebrand Games in November 2011.

=== Approved: 2011–2012 ===
USS released their next single, "N/A OK" on February 14, 2011.

In an interview with Eye Weekly, Parsons elaborated on what the duo was working on:

It's amazing. We're working with Tawgs Salter, who's done records with Lights, The Midway State, and Josh Groban, and he's been helping us define what the new USS is, from a songwriting perspective. We're free to be quirky, acoustic, singer-songwriter, electronic turntable-based music, but in a bigger sounding format that has global aspirations. We've returned more to the minimal that we showed on our first EP, Welding The C:/, but we're doing it with the right producer, to make it sound as big and powerful as we can be. At the start of the year we did a song with Ashley MacIsaac, and we followed that with what's hopefully going to become our new EP.

Approved, the band's second EP, was released digitally worldwide on May 3, 2011, the day of the release party at Toronto's MOD Club and the kickoff date for the USS Approved Spring/Summer Cross-Canada tour. The physical copy was exclusively released in Canada at the band's shows or on their official website. In an interview with Niagara Music Scene, Buchholz explained the EP's title: Approved, because it seems like everyone has issues of self-worth. YOU'RE ALL GOOD ENOUGH! Most of life is just overcompensation for not feeling like you are good enough. APPROVED!

By the end of summer 2011, the second single from Approved—"Yo Hello Hooray (Everyday)"—had begun receiving regular rotation on Canadian rock radio stations. "Yo Hello Hooray (Everyday)" is the band's highest-charting rock radio single in Canada to date.

"N/A OK" was nominated in the Rock category at the 2012 Canadian Radio Music Awards. The third single from Approved, "Damini", charted on the hits Canadian rock radio chart.

=== Advanced Basics: 2013–2015 ===
On June 4, 2013, USS released "This Is the Best", the first single from their third EP, Advanced Basics.

The band flew to London to perform in Trafalgar Square for Canada Day International alongside Canadian rock icons The Tragically Hip plus Jann Arden, The Sheepdogs, and Arkells.

USS released Advanced Basics in Canada on February 11, 2014. The album was funded through crowdsourcing site PledgeMusic, with the project titled "#Letsgetweirdtogether". To promote it, the band played pop-up shows across Toronto, which were filmed and released on YouTube. The song "Yin Yang" was later used to promote the fall lineup for CTV television.

The band toured Canada in March/April 2014 with Hedley and Classified.

On July 18, 2014, USS headlined This Is the Fest at Echo Beach in Toronto. The show was part of the Edgefest Concert Series, presented by 102.1 The Edge. They were given the opportunity to handpick the lineup, which included artists such as MS MR, Said the Whale, Bear Hands, Wildlife, Dear Rouge, and more. In the fall, they toured across Canada with Mother Mother.

In 2015, the duo was nominated for a Juno for Breakthrough Group of the Year and 102.1 The Edge's Casby Award for Favourite New Song for Shipwreck.

=== Final albums: 2017–2021 ===
In January 2017, USS released their second studio album, New World Alphabet.

On October 26, 2020, the band announced via Twitter that their upcoming album, Einsteins of Consciousness, would be their last, and posted a message saying goodbye to their fans and promising one final tour when it's appropriate to do so. The record was released on January 8, 2021.

=== Final Freakquency Tour: 2021 ===
On June 24, 2021, the band began selling tickets to their final farewell tour, dubbed the Final Freakquency Tour. This began on November 20 in Buffalo, New York, following the easing of COVID-19 restrictions. The tour was set to end on December 18, 2021, with the band's final performance in Toronto. However, due to the rise of the coronavirus Omicron variant, the show was postponed to June 2022.

In October 2021, NHL on Sportsnet introduced new theme music composed by the band, titled "Never Stop".

=== Reunion: 2025–present ===
In January 2025, USS announced a reunion show at Toronto's Concert Hall for June of that year, which sold out immediately; the band subsequently announced additional shows.

== Discography ==
Studio albums

- Questamation (2009)
- Advanced Basics (2014)
- New World Alphabet (2017)
- Einsteins of Consciousness (2021)
- The Science & Artfunkel Victory Lap (2021)

EPs

- Welding the C:/ (2007)
- Approved (2011)

Singles

| Song | Year | Chart peak | | Album |
| Song | Year | CAN | CAN Alt | Album |
|---|---|---|---|---|
| "Hollow Point Sniper Hyperbole" | 2007 | — | × | Welding the C:/ |
| "2 15/16" | 2008 | — | — | Welding the C:/ |
| "Laces Out" | 2009 | — | 23 | Questamation |
| "Anti-Venom" | 2009 | — | 22 | Questamation |
| "Mavericks" | 2010 | — | — | Non-album single |
| "N/A OK" | 2011 | — | 8 | Approved |
| "Yo Hello Hooray (Everyday)" | 2011 | — | 7 | Approved |
| "Damini" | 2012 | — | 8 | Approved |
| "This Is the Best" | 2013 | 75 | 3 | Advanced Basics |
| "Yin Yang" | 2014 | 95 | 3 | Advanced Basics |
| "Shipwreck" | 2014 | — | 14 | Advanced Basics |
| "Nepal" | 2015 | — | 14 | Advanced Basics |
| "Work Shoes" | 2016 | — | 2 | New World Alphabet |
| "Who's with Me" | 2017 | — | 18 | New World Alphabet |
| "California Medication" | 2017 | — | 22 | New World Alphabet |
| "Medicine" | 2018 | — | — | Einsteins of Consciousness |
| "Big Life (26 Letters)" | 2018 | — | — | Einsteins of Consciousness |
| "Odd Times" | 2020 | — | — | Non-album single |
| "Happy" | 2020 | — | 9 | Einsteins of Consciousness |
| "Feel Alive" | 2020 | — | — | Einsteins of Consciousness |
| "Turquoise 1:11" | 2021 | — | — | Non-album single |
| "Never Stop" | 2022 | — | — | Non-album single |
"—" denotes a release that did not chart. "×" denotes periods where charts did not exist or were not archived.

Music Videos
| Year | Video | Director |
|---|---|---|
| 2010 | "Laces Out" | Brockstreet Films |
| 2012 | "Damini" "Yo Hello Hooray" | tj derry |
| 2013 | "This Is the best" | CutCartel |
| 2014 | "Yin Yang" | David F. Mewa |
| 2015 | "Nepal" | David F. Mewa |
| 2016 | "Work Shoes" | Philip Sportel |
| 2017 | "California Medication" | Kirk Hipkiss |
| 2019 | "Big Life (26 Letters) | David Mewa |
| 2020 | "Odd Times" | Brent Hallman (Tivoli Films Inc./Hallman Animation Studios) |
| 2020 | "Happy" | Brent Hallman (Tivoli Films Inc./Hallman Animation Studios) |
| 2021 | "Pages" | Brent Hallman (Tivoli Films Inc./Hallman Animation Studios) |
