= Hold That Sound EP =

EP by Moneen
- Released: June 16, 2009
- Length: 15:12
- Label: Dine Alone

Moneen chronology
Saying Something You Have Already Said Before: A Quiet Side of Moneen (2006)	Hold That Sound EP (2009)	The World I Want to Leave Behind (2009)

Hold That Sound EP is an extended play by Canadian rock band Moneen. The album was released on June 16, 2009 through Dine Alone Records. The EP was released exclusively as a digital download and 12" vinyl limited to 500 copies (200 on black vinyl, 200 on white vinyl and 100 on clear vinyl).

Studio versions of "The Way" and "Waterfalls" in addition to "Hold That Sound" were later featured on Moneen's following studio album, The World I Want to Leave Behind. The song "Madness!" is exclusive to this release.

== Track listing ==
All tracks are written by Moneen

No.	Title	Length
1.	"Hold That Sound"	3:54
2.	"Madness!"	3:08
3.	"The Way" (Early Morning Acoustic)	4:21
4.	"Waterfalls" (Acoustic)	3:51
Total length:		15:12

== Personnel ==
- Kenny Bridges – vocals, guitar
- Chris Hughes – vocals, guitar
- Steve Nunnaro – drums
- Erik Hughes – bass
