= Beautiful Life (Vallejo album) =

Studio album by Vallejo
- Released: October 20, 1998
- Genre: Rock/Latin
- Length: 47:30
- Label: TVT
- Producer: Neill King

Vallejo chronology
Vallejo (1997)	Beautiful Life (1998)	Into the New (2000)

Professional ratings
Review scores
Source	Rating
AllMusic	4/5 stars
San Antonio Express-News	3.75/4 stars

Beautiful Life is the second studio album by the American band Vallejo, released in 1998.

== Production ==
DJ Hurricane contributed to four of the album's tracks.

== Critical reception ==
The Hartford Courant thought that "although the playing is accomplished and the singing competent, once you get past the spicy rhythms, the songs tend to sag from that sinking derivative feeling." Texas Monthly called the album "a polished and amiable but mostly nondescript blend of hard rock hooks and funky jamming, heavily seasoned with Latin touches and a hippie-meets-hip-hop vibe." The Virginian-Pilot wrote that "the problem with most of Beautiful Life is that Latin rhythms melded with '70s rock sound like '70s rock ... Hard funk mixed with '70s rock also sounds like '70s rock."

AllMusic wrote that "while the lyrics leave a little to be desired ... the focus is on catchy hooks and rock punch."

== Track listing ==
All songs composed by A.J. Vallejo, Alejandro Vallejo and Omar Vallejo except where specified

1. "Classico" (Vallejo) – 3:54
2. "Once Again" – 3:26
3. "Beautiful Life" – 4:10
4. "2053 (21st Century)" – 4:07
5. "If I Was President" – 3:40
6. "All in Your Head" (Vallejo) – 3:27
7. "Die Trying" – 4:01
8. "Naive" – 3:47
9. "Wasting My Time" (Bruce Castleberry, A.J. Vallejo, Alejandro Vallejo, O. Vallejo) – 4:10
10. "Snake in the Grass" (Samuel Barnes, DJ Hurricane, J.C. Olivier, Castleberry, A.J. Vallejo, Alejandro Vallejo, O. Vallejo) – 3:16
11. "Ya Me Voy" – 3:02
12. "Immortal" – 4:44
13. "Irish Man Lost in Spain" (composer unspecified) – 1:44 *

* Hidden track

Produced and Mixed by Steve Peck

Bobby Francavillo - Executive Producer

== Additional musicians ==
- DJ Hurricane

Credits

- Bruce Castleberry - Bamboo Pipe, Guitar
- DJ Hurricane - Remixing
- Bobby Filarowicz - Assistant Engineer
- Shayn Groves - Engineer
- Scott Hull - Mastering
- Neill King - Engineer, Mixing, Producer
- Chris Manning - Assistant Engineer
- Mike Scotella - Assistant Engineer
- Jim Scott - Mixing
- Diego Simmons - Congas, Percussion, Timbales
- Jason Stokes - Assistant Engineer
- A.J. Vallejo - Assistant Engineer, Guitar, Vocals
- Alejandro Vallejo - Drums, Percussion
- Omar Vallejo - Bass, Mixing, Background Vocals
- André Zweers - Digital Editing
- Bobby Francavillo - Executive Producer
