= Throw Ya Hands Up =

Single by Stereos featuring Jhevon Paris

from the album Stereos
- Released: September 1, 2009
- Genre: Pop rock
- Length: 2:41
- Label: Universal Music Canada
- Songwriter(s): Patrick Kordyback; Jesse Colburn; Jhevon Paris; Aaron Verdonk; Stereos
- Producer(s): Gavin Brown

Stereos singles chronology
"Summer Girl" (2009)	"Throw Ya Hands Up" (2009)	"Turn It Up" (2009)

"Throw Ya Hands Up" is a song recorded by Canadian band Stereos, which features vocals from rapper Jhevon Paris. It is the Stereos' second single from their self-titled debut album. It was released digitally on September 1, 2009. On the issue dated September 19, 2009, the song debuted on the Canadian Hot 100 at number three.

== Music video ==
The music video was shot in Miami, Florida. It starts off with the Stereos performing by the shore of Watson Island near the MacArthur Causeway. Other settings in the video include a pool party, a yacht, and other various locations at midnight.

== Charts ==
=== Weekly charts ===
Weekly chart performance for "Throw Ya Hands Up"
Chart (2009)	Peak position
Canada (Canadian Hot 100)	3
Canada CHR/Top 40 (Billboard)	11
Canada Hot AC (Billboard)	14

=== Year-end charts ===
Year-end chart performance for "Throw Ya Hands Up"
Chart (2009)	Position
Canada (Canadian Hot 100)	85

== Certification ==
Region	Certification	Certified units/sales
Canada (Music Canada)	2× Platinum	80,000^{*}
^{*} Sales figures based on certification alone.
