= Stereos (album) =

Studio album by Stereos
- Released: October 20, 2009
- Genre: Pop; pop rock
- Length: 35:24
- Label: Universal Music Canada
- Producer: Gavin Brown

Stereos chronology
Stereos (2009)	Uncontrollable (2010)

Singles from Stereos
- 1. "Summer Girl" Released: June 2009; 2. "Throw Ya Hands Up" Released: September 2009; 3. "Bye Bye Baby" Released: November 2009; 4. "Turn It Up" Released: December 2009; 5. "Butterflies" Released: March 2010; 6. "She Only Likes Me When She's Drunk" Released: July 2010

Professional ratings
Review scores
Source	Rating
AllMusic	2/5 stars

Stereos is the debut album by Canadian pop rock band Stereos, released on October 20, 2009. The deluxe version features two additional tracks "Bye Bye Baby" and "All U Pretty Girls". The album debuted at #3 on the Canadian Albums Chart, and was certified gold by the CRIA with over 40,000 copies sold. It was nominated for Best Pop Album at the 2010 Juno Awards, but lost to Michael Bublé's Crazy Love.

== Track listing ==
1. "Addicted" – 2:49
2. "Get with You" (featuring Far East Movement) – 3:00
3. "Summer Girl" – 2:45
4. "Butterflies" – 2:50
5. "Turn It Up" – 2:54
6. "Hey Cupid" – 3:20
7. "Jet Black Cadillac" – 2:57
8. "She Only Likes Me When She's Drunk" – 3:03
9. "Throw Ya Hands Up" (featuring Jhevon Paris) – 2:42
10. "Give You Up" – 3:46

=== Deluxe version ===
11. "Bye Bye Baby" – 3:02
12. "All U Pretty Girls" – 3:05

=== Deluxe version downloadable tracks ===
1. "Paid Like This and What Not"
2. "I Like It"
3. "Throw Ya Hands Up" (Real Talk remix)
4. "LA Dreamin"
5. "Summer Girl" (Coleco remix)
6. "Jet Black Cadillac" (remix feat. Devylle)
7. "Out of Love Song"
8. "Back Home"
9. "No Lie"
10. "Give Euro Up" (Give U Up remix)
11. "Get It On"
12. "Like U Do"

=== Bonus tracks ===
- "Summer Girl" (acoustic) – 2:43

== Charts ==
Chart performance for Stereos
Chart (2009)	Peak position
Canadian Albums (Billboard)	3

== Certifications ==
Region	Certification	Certified units/sales
Canada (Music Canada)	Gold	40,000^{^}
^{^} Shipments figures based on certification alone.
