= Rock Plaza Central =

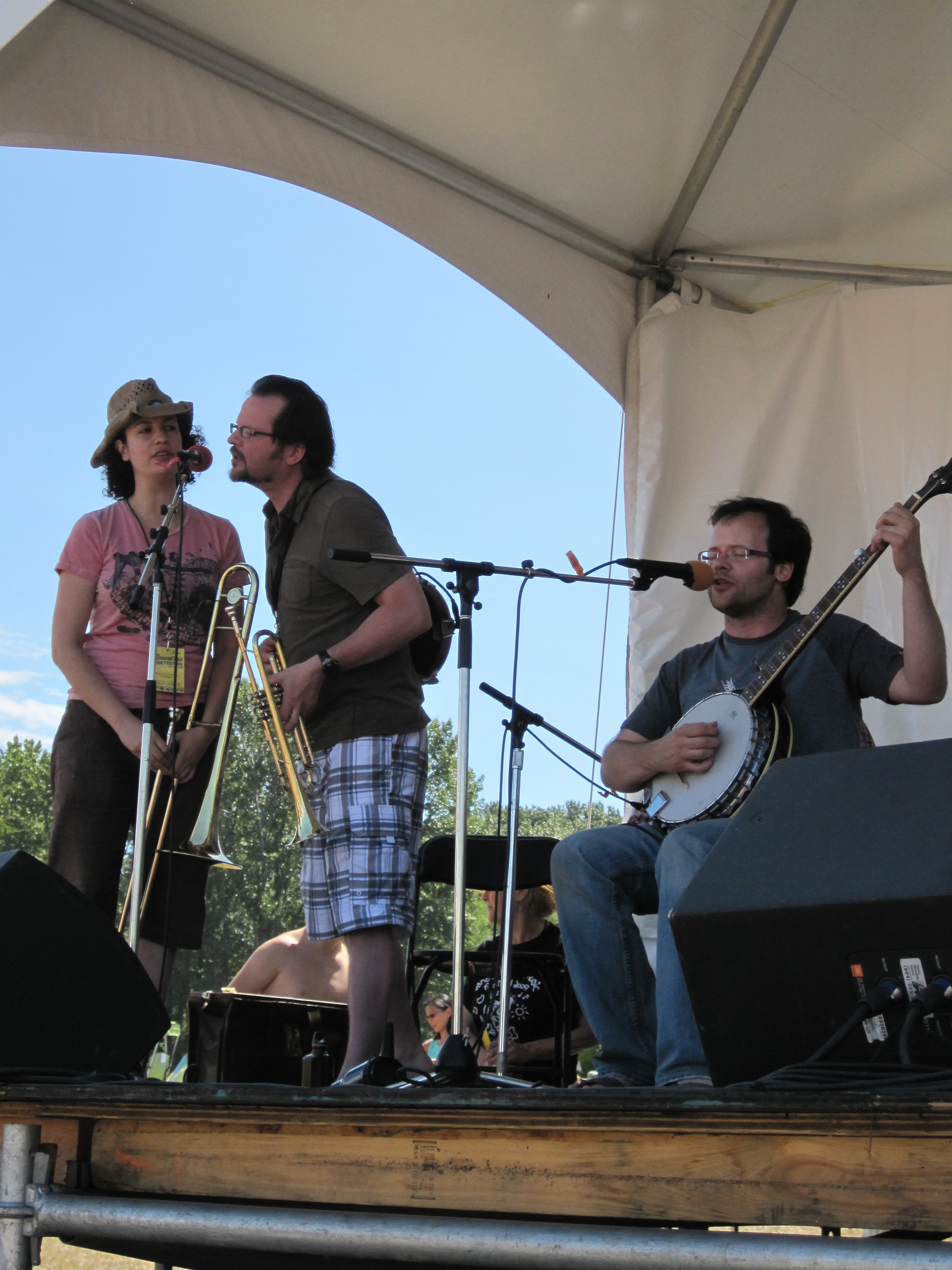
- Rock Plaza Central, July 2009

Background information
- Origin: Toronto, Ontario, Canada
- Genres: Indie rock, indie folk
- Years active: 1996–2010
- Labels: Paper Bag, Outside, Yep Roc
- Members: Chris Eaton; Rob Carson; Blake Howard; Scott Maynard; Donald Murray; Fiona Stewart; John Whytock
- Past members: Doug Tielli; John Tielli; Jack Breakfast

Rock Plaza Central was a band from Toronto, Canada. They came to international attention in 2007 with the release of Are We Not Horses, a critically acclaimed science fiction concept album about six-legged robotic horses in the midst of an existential crisis. They have been on hiatus since 2010.

== History ==
Novelist Chris Eaton began performing and recording under the moniker Rock Plaza Central in the late 1990s. In 1997, he released a debut album, Quantum Butterass, backed by members of Toronto band People From Earth. For the next six years, Eaton performed with a series of mostly improvised bands, often inviting other musicians to join him onstage at the last minute.

In August 2003, at a show at Sneaky Dee's in Toronto, Eaton invited old friend Don Murray to join him on mandolin and trumpet, as well as drummer Blake Howard (Guh, Slow Loris, Quadruped), accordionist and trumpeter John Whytock (Arrogant Worms), bassist Scott Maynard and multi-instrumentalist Rob Carson (both from The Quiet Revolution, but previously with By Divine Right and with Selina Martin). The line-up had such good chemistry that Eaton invited them to join the band permanently. At only their third meeting, they travelled to the House of Miracles to record The World Was Hell to Us with Andy Magoffin, with songs that were entirely unrehearsed and mostly recorded live from the floor as first takes.

The following year the band invited violinist Fiona Stewart from Reflectiostack to join them. Persisting in their strategy of never rehearsing, they played a monthly residency at the Tranzac Club, where Eaton gradually introduced into the band's repertoire a series of new songs about six-legged robotic horses struggling with their identities in the aftermath of a war between humans and angels. These songs would eventually become Are We Not Horses, their breakthrough album recorded with Dale Morningstar at the Gas Station in 2006. Critical reception for the record was extremely positive, with accolades coming from Pitchfork, americanaUK, and Magnet, who called it "2007's finest folk/rock find." In early 2007, the group also received considerable attention for their cover of the Justin Timberlake song "SexyBack". They soon signed to Yep Roc and to Outside Music.

From 2007 through 2009, the band toured extensively, performing alongside acts such as The Apples in Stereo, Calexico, Stephen Malkmus, The Mountain Goats, Sloan, and The Weakerthans. During this time, Carson, Whytock, and Howard all had to step away from the band to varying degrees, with drummer Andrew Innanen often joining the four remaining members on tour. In 2009, the band released another well received album, ...At the Moment of Our Most Needing.

Since going on hiatus in 2010, the band's music was used extensively in the indie zombie film The Battery.

Frontman Chris Eaton is also the author of three novels, The Inactivist (2003), The Grammar Architect (2005), and Chris Eaton, a biography that have been studied on several university courses across North America. He published a fourth novel Symphony No. 3 in 2019. Letters To Thomas Pynchon is a short fiction collection published as an eBook with Joyland: A hub for short fiction.

== Discography ==
=== Albums ===
- 1997: Quantum Butterass
- 2003: The World Was Hell to Us
- 2006: Are We Not Horses
- 2009: ...At the Moment of Our Most Needing
- 2012: Cover me with Brule.

=== Live ===
- 2007: Live at Urban Outfitters

=== Compilations ===
- 2012: Cover Me With Brule

=== Videos ===
- 2007: "Anthem for the Already Defeated" (Humble Empire)
- 2007: "My Children Be Joyful" (Humble Empire)
- 2008: "I Am An Excellent Steel Horse" (Humble Empire)
- 2010: "(Don't You Believe the Words of) Handsome Men" (Akaflk and Epstein Creative)
