= ...At the Moment of Our Most Needing =

...at the moment of our most needing

Studio album by Rock Plaza Central
- Released: May 28, 2009
- Genre: Indie rock
- Label: Paper Bag

Rock Plaza Central chronology
Are We Not Horses (2006)	...at the moment of our most needing (2009)

Professional ratings
Review scores
Source	Rating
AllMusic	3.5/5 stars
Pitchfork	8/10 stars

...at the moment of our most needing is the fourth album by Canadian indie rock band Rock Plaza Central, released in Canada on May 28, 2009 on Paper Bag Records and in the US on June 16.

The album is reportedly inspired by William Faulkner's novel Light in August.

Some advance publicity for the album reported its title as ...at the Moment of our Most Needing or If Only They Could Turn Around, They Would Know They Weren't Alone, but its actual title upon release was just ...at the moment of our most needing. Frontman Chris Eaton told the music magazine Magnet in March 2009 that he had not yet decided between two distinct titles, either ...at the moment of our most needing or If Only They Could Turn Around, They Would Know They Weren't Alone, but other advance coverage of the album incorrectly reported that as a single title rather than a pending choice between two shorter ones.

== Track listing ==
No.	Title	Length
1.	"Oh I Can"	5:21
2.	"A Mule on Fire"	2:21
3.	"(Don't You Believe the Words of) Handsome Men"	3:45
4.	"O Lord, How Many Are My Foes"	2:26
5.	"The World Is Good Enough"	3:26
6.	"Country/Sea"	2:19
7.	"Them That Are Good and Them That Are Bad"	3:59
8.	"The Wrong Side of the Right"	3:35
9.	"Holy Rider"	2:07
10.	"The Long Dead March"	3:30
11.	"We Are Full of Light (That Blinds Us at the Moment of our Most Needing)"	2:47
12.	"Wherever You Are, I'm Home"	3:29
13.	"The Hot Blind Earth"	3:28
