= Are We Not Horses =

Studio album by Rock Plaza Central
- Released: April 17, 2007 (United States)
- Genre: Folk rock
- Length: 38:51
- Label: Yep Roc/Outside Music

Rock Plaza Central chronology
The World Was Hell to Us (2003)	Are We Not Horses (2007)	...At the Moment of Our Most Needing (2009)

Are We Not Horses is a 2006 concept album album by the Canadian indie folk band Rock Plaza Central. The album tells the story of mechanical horses who believe that they are real animals. Initially self-released in 2006, the album was released on the label Yep Rock in the United States a year later.

In 2009, the album was taught in a graduate Contemporary Literature course at the University of South Alabama, alongside frontman Chris Eaton's 2003 novel The Inactivist. An outdoor theatrical adaptation, titled When We Dance, We Dance Together, was performed in Toronto in 2017. The stage play uses giant puppets for the characters.

== Concept ==
The album focuses on six-legged robot horses who believe that they are actually real and not machines. An apocalyptic war between angels and humans erupts, during which the horses are used by humans in battle. The horses begin to question whether this is right, leading to an identity crisis which ends with the horses finally realizing that they are robots. The robot horses accept this once they realize that can still find a purpose in the world.

The war between the humans and angels came from a song on the band's previous album, The World Was Hell To Us. Frontman Chris Eaton said that while working on Horses, "gradually a metallic theme emerged and horses kept coming up." In The World Was Hell To Us, the angel and human war ends bleakly, while Are We Not Horses? has a more hopeful ending involving redemption.

Eaton said that the message of the album "was about not really knowing who you are, or being unsure of who you are, but being comfortable with that...sometimes life can be confusing, at the same time there is a lot of good going on that you should be happy about."

== Track listing ==
1. "I Am an Excellent Steel Horse" – 3:12
2. "How Shall I to Heaven Aspire?" – 2:02
3. "My Children, Be Joyful" – 5:51
4. "Anthem for the Already Defeated" – 2:03
5. "Fifteen Hands" – 3:50
6. "Are We Not Horses?" – 3:06
7. "When We Go, How We Go (Part 1)" – 2:25
8. "Our Pasts, Like Lighthouses" – 4:13
9. "8/14/03" – 0:56
10. "Our Hearts Will Not Rust" – 3:44
11. "When We Go, How We Go (Part II)" – 3:25
12. "We've Got a Lot to Be Glad For" – 3:58

== Reception ==
Professional ratings
Review scores
Source	Rating
AllMusic	3.5/5 stars
Pitchfork	(8.4/10)

Are We Not Horses? relieved mainly positive reviews. Pitchfork staff writer Stephen Deusner gave it an 8.4 out of 10, calling it a "beguiling, often beautiful album" and concluding that it is "accessible, supremely affecting, and unique." NPR featured "My Children, Be Joyful" as its Song of the Day for 12 January 2007, with Kathryn Yu comparing its instrumentation to that of Neutral Milk Hotel and the Decemberists, and praising the song's message. In a 2014 retrospective review, Henry Adam Svec of Vice called it "one hell of a record", praising the instrumentals and Eaton's vocal style. Allmusic's John Schach t was more negative, observing that some songs (such as "08/14/03") did not directly relate to the concept, and found it easy to ignore the "cubist rock opera" that the songs form, though he still praised Eaton's vocals and believed that the band had pulled off the concept.

Are We Not Horses? was included on year-end best lists in both 2006 and 2007. CMJ editor-in-chief Kenny Herzog put it at #8 on his list of the best albums of 2006. Deusner put it at #8 for his Ptichfork-published end of 2006 list. Exclaim! placed the album at #4 on its year-end best albums list. Three years later, in 2009, Consequence of Sound placed the album at #9 on a list of the best concept albums.

Though overall reception was positive, some outlets still poked fun at the odd premise. Eric Sundermann of The Daily Iowan called the album "a WTF moment". The 2007 comedy trivia book Uncle John's Bathroom Reader Plunges Into Music included the album in a list of weird or bad concept albums, sarcastically writing: "It's a cruel world. Robot horses who think they're real horses slowly come to the realization that they are, in fact, robot horses." In Vice's aformentioned retrospective, however, Svec wrote that he found it avoided campiness by having a complex tone, and that while the idea of a robot horse's identity crisis is "funny", it's "also touching and relatable. It's both at once."
