= Questamation =

Studio album by Ubiquitous Synergy Seeker
- Released: March 9, 2009
- Recorded: 2008–2009 in Toronto
- Genre: Alternative dance, drum and bass
- Length: 53:58
- Label: Smashing World Records
- Producer: Matthew Wagner

Ubiquitous Synergy Seeker chronology
Welding the C:/ (2008)	Questamation (2009)	Approved (2011)

Singles from Questamation
- 1. "Laces Out" Released: 2009; 2. "Anti-Venom" Released: 2010; 3. "3 Purple Butterflies" Released: 2010

Questamation is the first full-length semi-programmed album by Canadian band Ubiquitous Synergy Seeker (alias USS), consisting of Ashley Boo-Schultz on guitar and vocals, and Jason Parsons (a.k.a. Human Kebab) on turntables and programming, released on March 9, 2009. For the recording, USS teamed up with Matthew Wagner (Crystal Castles, Alpha Galates) for production and engineering, as well as with Chris Davies and Charles Topping who 'aided musically'.

"It's going to be our hello to the world," Parsons said.

== "Laces Out" ==
"Laces Out" is USS' first single off Questamation. Released on February 10, 2009, it was soon aired on multiple radio stations, including 102.1 The Edge, which earlier had "Hollowpoint Sniper Hyperbole" in heavy rotation, inspiring USS to begin producing music videos for their more popular songs, such as "2 15/16ths".

The music video for "Laces Out" was shot in mid-March 2009. It was directed by Jon Knautz and produced by Brookstreet Pictures, along with LifeForce Entertainment.

== Track listing ==
No.	Title	Length
1.	"Cloudboy"	3:56
2.	"Laces Out"	2:33
3.	"P.S. I Can Change"	4:49
4.	"Anti-Venom"	3:47
5.	"Neurochemical Warfare Gas Masquerade"	4:19
6.	"Stationery Robbery"	2:58
7.	"Better Living Centre"	1:14
8.	"3 Purple Butterflies"	3:33
9.	"Stranger to Myself"	4:15
10.	"Man Makes the Zoo"	5:08
11.	"Visionary Science Patrol"	4:37
12.	"Me vs. Us"	19:03

== Reviews ==
- CD Review: USS Questamation
