= Ryan MacGrath =

Canadian singer-songwriter

- Origin: Halifax, Nova Scotia, Canada
- Instruments: Vocals, guitar

Ryan MacGrath is a Canadian singer-songwriter, whose folk-pop style is frequently compared to Rufus Wainwright and Hawksley Workman. Born in Antigonish, Nova Scotia and raised in Guysborough County, he has been an active member of the Halifax music scene. He is currently based in Innsbruck, Austria.

MacGrath first moved to Halifax to study painting at NSCAD. After buying a guitar, he began performing with the band Ryan MacGrath and the woodenhouse, which released a self-titled EP in 2006 before changing its name to The Missing City Starlight.

MacGrath subsequently released a solo EP, In My Own Company, in 2009, and the full-length album Cooper Hatch Paris in 2010.

MacGrath continues to exhibit his painting. While he was preparing Cooper Hatch Paris, pop singer Chantal Kreviazuk saw and liked one of his gallery pieces; MacGrath arranged a trade in which he gave the painting to Kreviazuk in exchange for a guest contribution to the album. He also funded the album in part by auctioning his services as a songwriter, offering to write a romantic Valentine's Day song for the winning bidder and their partner.

In 2011, Cooper Hatch Paris was awarded Music Nova Scotia's award for Alternative Recording of the Year. In addition to this, the recording was nominated for a number of East Coast Music Awards, including Alternative Recording of the Year, Male Solo Recording of the Year and Rising Star Recording of the Year.

Two of MacGrath's songs were featured in Thom Fitzgerald's movie Cloudburst, starring Olympia Dukakis and Brenda Fricker. MacGrath contributed "Bird and Cage" from Cooper Hatch Paris and "Like You Do", a song penned specifically for the movie.

In November 2011, MacGrath was commissioned by the Mental Health Foundation Nova Scotia to pen a song for their annual gala to raise awareness for mental health. MacGrath wrote the track "One Million Fireflies" and performed with a 30-piece gospel choir.

MacGrath moved to Innsbruck, Austria in January 2012, where he now has residency. Since moving to Austria he has been writing material for his second full-length album and third EP, tentatively titled The Pink Lark.

He is openly gay.

== Discography ==
- Ryan MacGrath and thewoodenhouse (2006)
- In My Own Company (2009)
- Cooper Hatch Paris (2010)
- The Pink Lark (2013)
- That Woods (2019)
