= Stereo (Vallejo album) =

Studio album by Vallejo
- Released: October 22, 2002
- Genre: Rock/Latin
- Length: 44:07
- Label: Vallejo Music Group

Vallejo chronology
Into the New (2000)	Stereo (2002)

Professional ratings
Review scores
Source	Rating
The Austin Chronicle	3.5/4 stars

Stereo is a studio album by the American band Vallejo, released in 2002.

"So Damn Beautiful" was covered by New Zealand singer Michael Murphy on his debut album, although the members of Vallejo were not initially credited as songwriters.

== Critical reception ==
The Austin Chronicle wrote that Vallejo "has finally tipped the bottle all the way back and ingested the worm at the bottom ... their influences are now simply their sound, figuratively, not literally as with all young bands."

== Track listing ==
All songs composed by Heath Clark, A.J. Vallejo, Alejandro Vallejo and Omar Vallejo except where specified

1. "Take a Ride" (Vallejo) – 3:54
2. "Downtown" – 3:48
3. "Vices" – 3:41
4. "Rock Americano" – 3:56
5. "Answers Inside" – 3:32
6. "You Are" – 4:27
7. "Devils" – 3:38
8. "Hard Times" – 2:35
9. "Wait for Me" – 4:15
10. "So Damn Beautiful" (Chris Rodriguez, Clark, James Simmons, A.J. Vallejo, Alejandro Vallejo, O. Vallejo) – 3:32
11. "Let's Talk About It" (Emilio Estefan, Jr., A.J. Vallejo, Alejandro Vallejo, O. Vallejo) – 3:22
12. "Mexican Radio" (Stanard Funsten, Charles Gray, Marc Moreland, Joe Nanini) – 3:24 *
  - Originally performed by Wall of Voodoo, 1982

* Bonus track
