= STEREO experiment =

Experiment investigating oscillation of neutrinos

The STEREO experiment (Search for Sterile Reactor Neutrino Oscillations) investigated the possible oscillation of neutrinos from a nuclear reactor into light so-called sterile neutrinos. It was located at the Institut Laue–Langevin (ILL) in Grenoble, France. The experiment took data from November 2016 to November 2020. The final results of the experiment rejected the hypothesis of a light sterile neutrino.

== Detector ==
=== Measuring principle ===
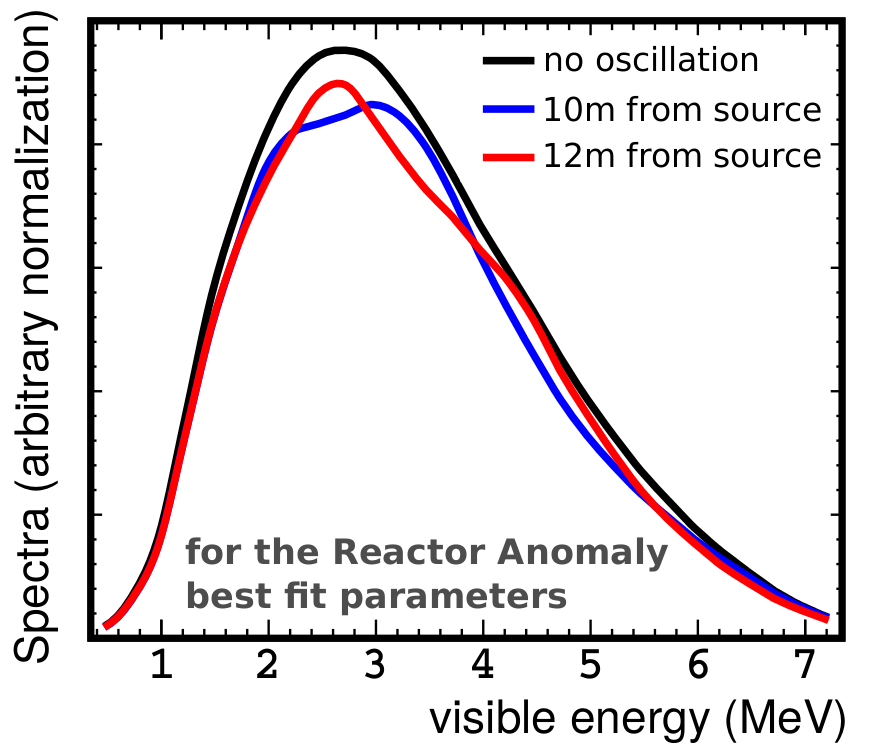
Figure 2: Comparison of the different spectra at 10 m and 12 m distance to the reactor. The black line shows the case without oscillation into sterile neutrinos while the blue and red show the case including the oscillation into a light sterile neutrino

The STEREO detector is placed at a distance of 10 m away from the research reactor at the ILL. The research reactor has a thermal power of 58 MW. STEREO is supposed to measure the neutrino flux and spectrum near the reactor. To be able to detect the neutrinos radiated from the reactor, the detector is filled up with 1800 litres of organic liquid scintillator which is doped with gadolinium. Inside the scintillator neutrinos are captured via the process of inverse beta decay

$$\overline{\nu}_e + p \rightarrow n + e^+$$

In this process a positron is produced. When the positron moves through the scintillator a light signal is produced, which is detected by the 48 photomultiplier tubes (PMTs) placed at the top of the detector cells. The capturing of the neutron which is also produced during the inverse beta decay produces a second coincidence signal.

The expected distance between the oscillation maximum and minimum of light sterile neutrinos is about 2 m. To see the oscillation the detector is divided into 6 separate detector cells, which each measure the energy spectrum of the detected neutrinos. By comparing the measured spectra a possible oscillation could be discovered (see Figure 2).

The STEREO experiment detects $\sim400$ neutrinos per day.

=== Detector shielding ===
Neutrinos only interact weakly. Therefore, neutrino detectors such as STEREO need to be very sensitive and need a good shielding from additional background signals to be able to detect neutrinos precisely.

To achieve this high sensitivity the 6 inner detector cells are surrounded by a liquid scintillator (without gadolinium) which acts as a "Gamma-Catcher" detecting in- and outgoing gamma radiation. This significantly increases the detection efficiency as well as the energy resolution of the detector. A cherenkov detector filled with water is placed on top of the detector to detect cosmic muons which are produced in the atmosphere and would otherwise act as a large background source. To shield the detector from radioactive sources coming from surrounding experiments it is surrounded and shielded by many layers (65 t) of mostly lead and polyethylene but also iron, steel and $\ce{B_4C}$.

== Motivation ==
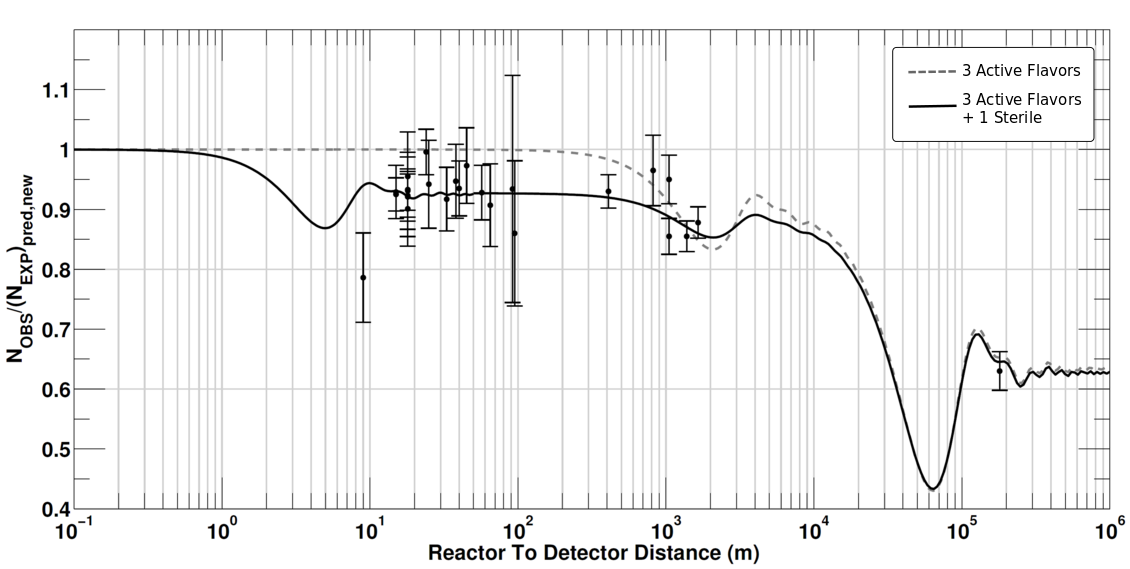
Figure 3: The reactor-antineutrino-anomaly (RAA)

Although neutrino oscillation is a phenomenon that is quite well understood today, there are still some experimental observations that question the completeness of our understanding. The most prominent of these observations is the so-called reactor antineutrino anomaly (RAA) (see Figure 3). A number of short baseline reactor-neutrino experiments have measured a significantly lower anti-electron neutrino (ν̅_{e}) flux compared to the theoretical predictions (a 2,7 σ deviation). Further experimental anomalies are the unexpected appearance of ν̅_{e} in a short-baseline ν̅_{μ} beam (LSND anomaly) as well as the disappearance of ν̅_{e} at short distances during the calibration phase of the GALLEX and SAGE experiments known as the gallium neutrino anomaly.

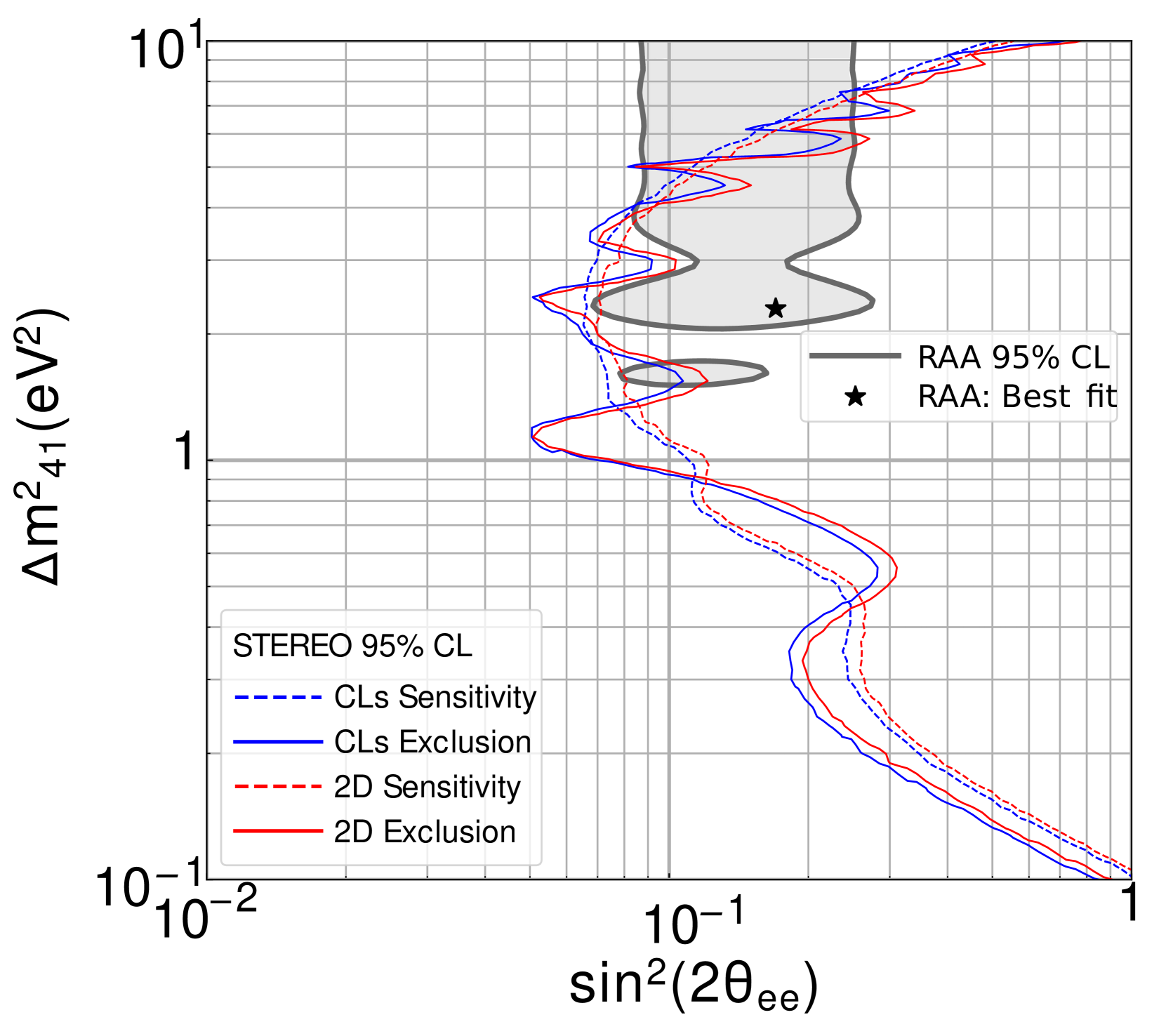
Figure 4: Final results of the STEREO experiment. The 95% confidence limit parameter space for a sterile neutrino explanation of the RAA is shown in grey. Values right of the exclusion curves in red and blue are rejected.

These anomalies could signify that our understanding of neutrino oscillations is not yet complete and that neutrinos oscillate into another 4th neutrino species. However measurements of the decay width of the Z boson at the Large Electron–Positron Collider (LEP) exclude the existence of a light 4th "active" (i.e. interacting via the weak force) neutrino. Hence the oscillation into additional light "sterile" neutrinos is considered as a possible explanation of the observed anomalies. In addition sterile neutrinos appear in many prominent extensions of the Standard Model of particle physics, e.g. in the seesaw type 1 mechanism.

== Results ==
Initial results were released in 2018 exploiting a dataset of 66 days of reactor turned on. Most of the parameter space that could account for the RAA was excluded at a 90% confidence level. The final results were published in 2023. 107,588 antineurinos were detected from October 2017 until November 2020. The sterile neutrino explanation for the RAA was rejected up to a few (eV)² for the square mass splitting between standard and sterile neutrino states (see figure 4).
