= Summer Girl (Stereos song) =

Single by Stereos

from the album Stereos
- Released: June 2009
- Genre: Pop rock
- Length: 2:46
- Label: Universal Music Canada
- Songwriter: Patrick Kordyback
- Producer: Gavin Brown

Stereos singles chronology
| "Summer Girl" (2009) | "Throw Ya Hands Up" (2009) |

"Summer Girl" is the debut single by Canadian pop band Stereos, written by Patrick Kordyback from their self-titled debut album. It was the song they performed on MuchMusic's disBAND reality show, which led them to being signed by Universal Canada. It was released as a single in 2009. The song is about meeting a girl and wanting to have a one night stand, despite the fact that both parties have a significant other.

== Music video ==
In the music video, the band is first shown standing in front of a red car with the word Stereos displayed on the license plate as well as performing at a beach party. The lead singer is shown walking around a beach alongside two girls, and then attends the party later that night with one of them. Some of the judges on the episode of disBAND that the band was featured on can be seen talking to the lead singer at the party.

== Charts ==
=== Weekly charts ===
Weekly chart performance for "Summer Girl"
| Chart (2009) | Peak position |
|---|---|
| Canada (Canadian Hot 100) | 2 |
| Canada CHR/Top 40 (Billboard) | 7 |
| Canada Hot AC (Billboard) | 9 |

=== Year-end charts ===
Year-end chart performance for "Summer Girl"
| Chart (2009) | Position |
|---|---|
| Canada (Canadian Hot 100) | 35 |

== Certification ==
| Region | Certification | Certified units/sales |
|---|---|---|
| Canada (Music Canada) | 2× Platinum | 80,000^{*} |
^{*} Sales figures based on certification alone.

== Release history ==
Release dates and formats for "Summer Girl"
| Region | Date | Format | Label(s) | Ref. |
|---|---|---|---|---|
| United States | September 15, 2009 | Mainstream airplay | Island | |
