= Moneen =

Canadian indie rock band

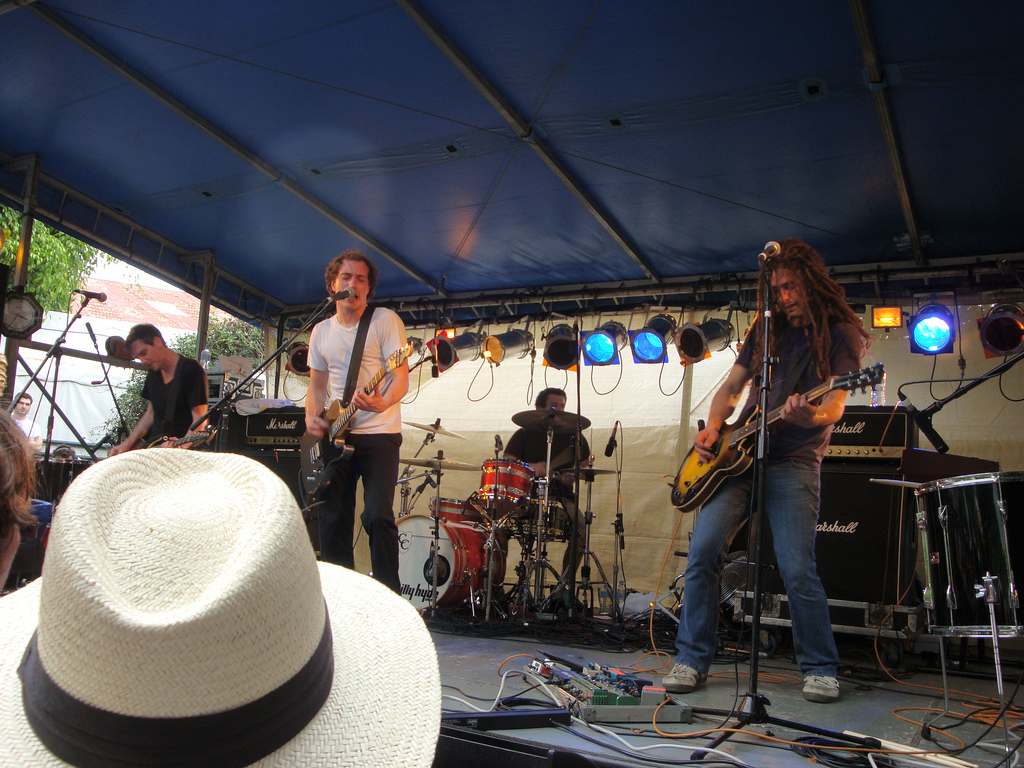
- Moneen in 2006

Background information
- Origin: Brampton, Ontario, Canada
- Genres: Indie rock; emo
- Years active: 1999–present (Note: Hiatus: 2013–2016)
- Labels: Dine Alone, Vagrant, Smallman
- Members: Kenny Bridges; Chris 'The Hippy' Hughes; Erik Hughes; Peter Krpan
- Past members: Steve Nunnaro; Mark Bowser; Chris Slorach
- Website: moneenlovesyou.com

Moneen (sometimes stylised as .moneen.) is a Canadian indie rock band from Brampton, Ontario.

== History ==
Moneen formed in 1999 after the dissolution of another band, called Perfectly Normal. The founding members were singer/guitarist Kenny Bridges, bassist Mark Bowser, drummer Peter Krpan, and singer/guitarist Chris Hughes.

The band recorded their first EP Smaller Chairs for the Early 1900s in Bridges' basement. They then re-released it on Smallman Records with their second album "The Theory of Harmonial Value", the band's next release was Are We Really Happy with Who We Are Right Now in 2003. The album appeared on the !earshot National Top 50 chart in August, 2003.

Bowser was replaced by Chris Slorach (Nu Chris), who left the band after the release of The Theory of Harmonial Value. Erik Hughes (who played bass for the band on their first Canadian tour) later became the permanent bass player for the band.

In 2003, the band's lineup was Bridges, Krpan, and Chris and Erik Hughes. That year they performed in Austin.

Moneen later signed to Vagrant Records. Smallman Records still distributes their albums in Canada. In 2005, they released a split EP with friends Alexisonfire on Dine Alone Records, on which each band covered two of the other's songs, plus one original song.

In 2005, director Alex Liu followed the band through the recording process for The Red Tree, filming a documentary entitled The Start to This May Be the End to Another. The Red Tree was released on April 11, 2006, on CD and vinyl. The vinyl release of The Red Tree was limited to 300 copies. The band joined the 2006 Warped Tour to promote the album. The documentary was released as part of The Moneen DVD: It All Started with a Red Stripe on May 13, 2008. The DVD had been nominated for a Juno Award for Music DVD of The Year.

In March 2008, Moneen parted ways with their drummer Peter Krpan, who decided to start a solo project named One Grand Canyon; the band recruited drummer Steve Nunnaro as a permanent replacement.

Moneen began recording their fourth studio album The World I Want to Leave Behind in December 2008; it was released September 15, 2009, with Dine Alone Records. They released it on CD and vinyl. The vinyl release had a bonus track called "Dark & Ugly". The band went on tour in the United States to support the album, including a stop in Los Angeles at the Troubadour.

In 2010, Peter Krpan re-joined Moneen as the permanent drummer. The band opened for several dates on Alexisonfire's farewell tour in December 2012, however the band had performed very little throughout 2012 and after 2013 were in hiatus. Krpan, along with Chris and Eric Hughes, formed a new band in 2013 named Seas, signed a deal with Black Box Music, and went out on tour. Bridges joined a band called Cunter, worked as the guitar tech for The Sheepdogs, toured with Say Anything on guitar, and released an EP in August 2015 titled Love and Hate.

In 2016, Moneen performed in Mississauga, Ontario, at Cuchulainn's Irish Pub.

In 2017, the band played a four-date tour leading up to the 10th anniversary of The Red Tree, held at Lee's Palace in Toronto.

In January 2019, the band played three shows at the Phoenix Concert Theatre in Toronto to celebrate the 15th anniversary of Are We Really Happy with Who We Are Right Now. In April 2019, Alexisonfire announced that Moneen would be supporting then for one date in July 2019, describing Moneen as the "Siegfried to Alexisonfire's Roy".

In May 2023, Moneen announced an upcoming Canadian tour for the fall of 2023. The eight show tour is a 20th anniversary tour for Are We Really Happy With Who We Are Right Now and will be supported by Sparta who will be celebrating the 20th anniversary of their album Wiretap Scars.

== Band members ==
=== Current ===
- Kenny Bridges – vocals, guitar (2000–present)
- Chris "Hippy" Hughes – guitar, vocals (2000–present)
- Erik Hughes – bass guitar, vocals (2001–present)
- Peter Krpan – drums, percussion (2000–2008, 2010–present)

=== Former ===
- Mark Bowser – bass guitar (2000)
- (Nu) Chris Slorach – bass guitar (2000–2001)
- Steve Nunnaro – drums, percussion (2008–2010)

== Discography ==
=== Studio albums ===
- The Theory of Harmonial Value (2001), Smallman Records
- Are We Really Happy with Who We Are Right Now? (2003), Smallman Records
- The Red Tree (2006), Vagrant Records, (2012), Vinyl Repress Dine Alone Records
- The World I Want to Leave Behind (2009), Dine Alone Records

=== EPs ===
- Smaller Chairs for the Early 1900s (1999), Smallman Records
- The Switcheroo Series: Alexisonfire vs. Moneen (2005), Dine Alone Records
- Saying Something You Have Already Said Before: A Quiet Side of Moneen (2006), Vagrant Records
- Hold That Sound EP (2009), Dine Alone Records

=== DVDs ===
- The Moneen DVD: It All Started with a Red Stripe (2008)

=== Music videos ===
- "No Better Way To Show Your Love Than A Set Of Broken Legs" (2002)
- "Tonight, I'm Gone..." (2002)
- "Life's Just Too Short Little Ndugu" (2003)
- "Are We Really Happy with Who We Are Right Now?" (2003) Directed by Jeff Scheven
- "Start Angry... End Mad" (2004) Directed by Jeff Scheven
- "Passing Out in America/Accidents Are on Purpose" (2006) Directed by Marc Ricciardelli
- "If Tragedy's Appealing, Then Disaster's an Addiction" (2006) Directed by Shane Drake
- "Don't Ever Tell Locke What He Can't Do" (2006) Directed by Matt Bass
- "Hold That Sound" (2009) Directed by Michael Maxxis

== See also ==
- List of bands from Canada
