= The Red Tree (album) =

Studio album by Moneen
- Released: April 11, 2006
- Recorded: November 2005 – January 2006
- Genre: Indie rock
- Length: 42:44
- Label: Vagrant Records
- Producer: Brian McTernan

Moneen chronology
The Switcheroo Series: Burning Down The Pine Room (2005)	The Red Tree (2006)	Saying Something You Have Already Said Before: A Quiet Side of Moneen (2006)

Professional ratings
Review scores
Source	Rating
AbsolutePunk.net	95% link
Allmusic	link
Contactmusic.com	9/10 link
Emotionalpunk.com	9/10 link
Europunk.net	link
Punktastic.com	link

The Red Tree is the third full-length album by the rock band Moneen. There was also a documentary that chronicled the writing and recording of this album. A music video was released for If Tragedy’s Appealing, Then Disaster’s An Addiction, and it has had some play-time on MuchMusic and FUSE.

== Track listing ==
All tracks are written by Moneen.

No.	Title	Length
1.	"Don't Ever Tell Locke What He Can't Do"	2:58
2.	"If Tragedy's Appealing, Then Disaster's an Addiction"	3:20
3.	"Bleed and Blister" (Version 3)	3:27
4.	"The Day No One Needed to Know"	6:05
5.	"This Is All Bigger Than Me"	3:05
6.	"The Frightening Reality of the Fact That We Will All Have to Grow Up and Settle Down One Day"	3:56
7.	"The Politics of Living and the Shame in Dying"	3:37
8.	"The East Has Stolen What The West May Want"	3:35
9.	"Seasons Fade… Fevers Rage... It's a Slow Decay"	3:46
10.	"There Are a Million Reasons for Why This May Not Work… And Just One Good One for Why It Will"	5:39
11.	"The Song I Swore to Never Sing"	3:22
Total length:		42:44

Vinyl Bonus Track(s)
No.	Title	Length
12.	"His Own Anomaly (39 42' 10" N 044 16' 30"E)"	4:45
13.	"Prepare Yourself... The Worst Is Yet to Come (Vinyl Repress)"	4:02
Total length:		47:29

== Additional information ==
- Don't Ever Tell Locke What He Can't Do is a reference to John Locke, a character on the television series Lost.
- The East Has Stolen What the West May Want tells the story of two lovers who were separated by the Berlin Wall.
- If you rewind it on your CD player for 1:09 seconds there is a short acoustic clip of The Last Song I Will Ever Want to Sing, which vocalist Kenny Bridges recorded by himself and added to the cd without the band's knowledge. The clip is supposed to make the transition between the Red Tree and the band's previous release, Are We Really Happy With Who We Are Right Now?
- A limited run of The Red Tree was available on vinyl in early 2007 through the band's website and at shows only. Each copy is numbered, only 300 were available and includes a bonus track not available on the CD version.
- The Red Tree was repressed on white and red vinyl for Record Store Day 2012. It featured bonus tracks "His Own Anomaly (39 42' 10" N 044 16' 30" E)" and previously released "Prepare Yourself...The Worst Is Yet To Come". A 7" single was also included, featuring two demos, "Hating Makes Hate OK" and "I'm Afraid Of The Lost Parade". The pressing was limited to 500 copies.

== Charts ==
Chart performance
Chart (2006)	Peak position
Canadian Albums (Nielsen SoundScan)	42
US Heatseekers Albums (Billboard)	18
US Independent Albums (Billboard)	25
