= Stereos =

Canadian band

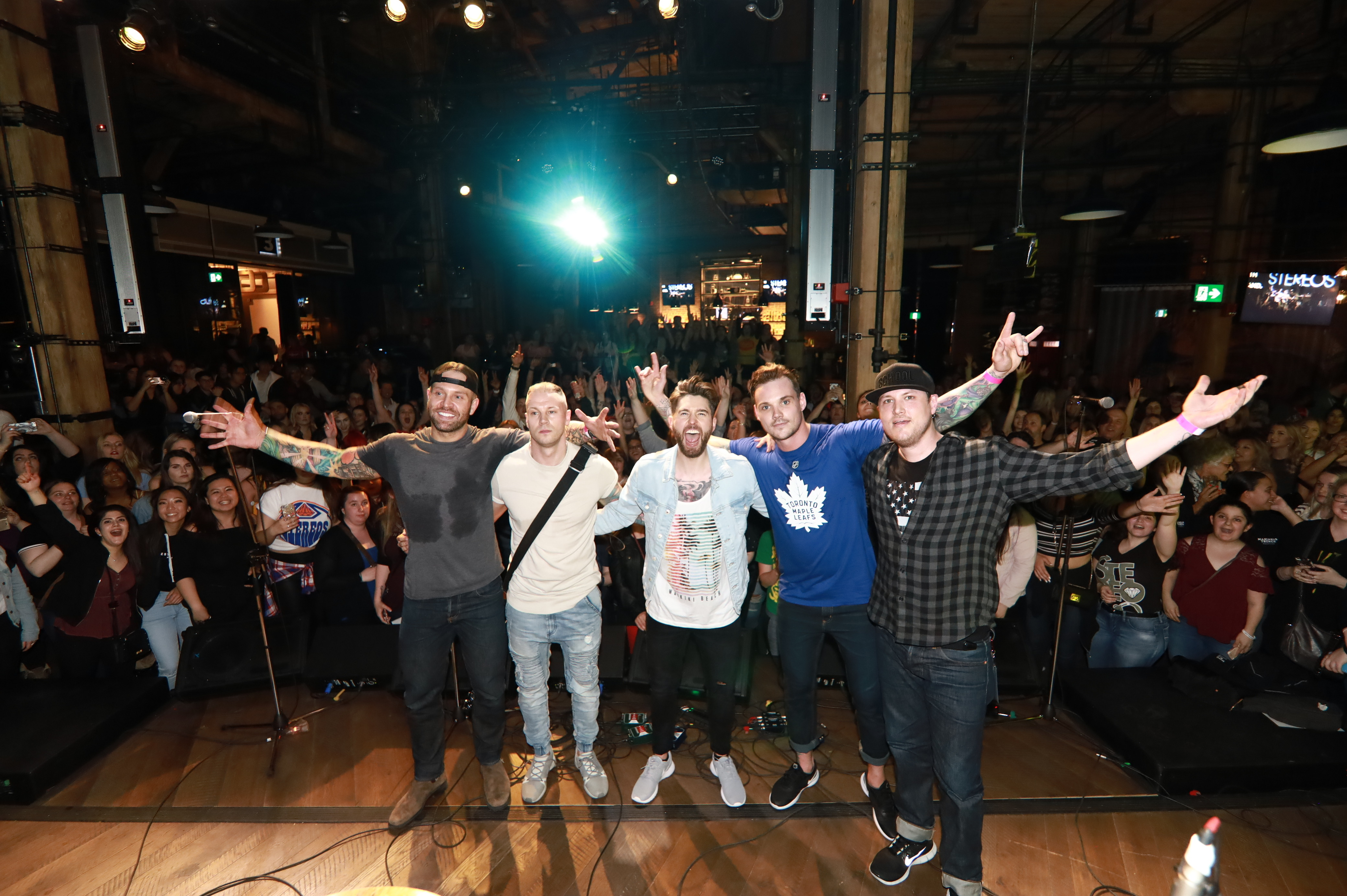
- Stereos at their 10-Year Anniversary show in Toronto in 2019

Background information
- Also known as: Stand By Me; Turn It Up
- Origin: Edmonton, Alberta, Canada
- Genres: Pop rock
- Years active: 2008–2013, 2019–present
- Labels: Sonny Boy Records; Universal Music Canada; Island/Def Jam
- Members: Patrick Kordyback; Miles Holmwood; Robert Chalifoux; Daniel Johnson; Aaron Verdonk

Stereos is a Canadian pop rock band from Edmonton, Alberta, formed in 2008. Their musical style fuses aspects of electronic music, rock, and pop. Their breakout came from appearing on the MuchMusic original series, disBAND. In October 2009, they released their debut self-titled album, Stereos.

== Biography ==
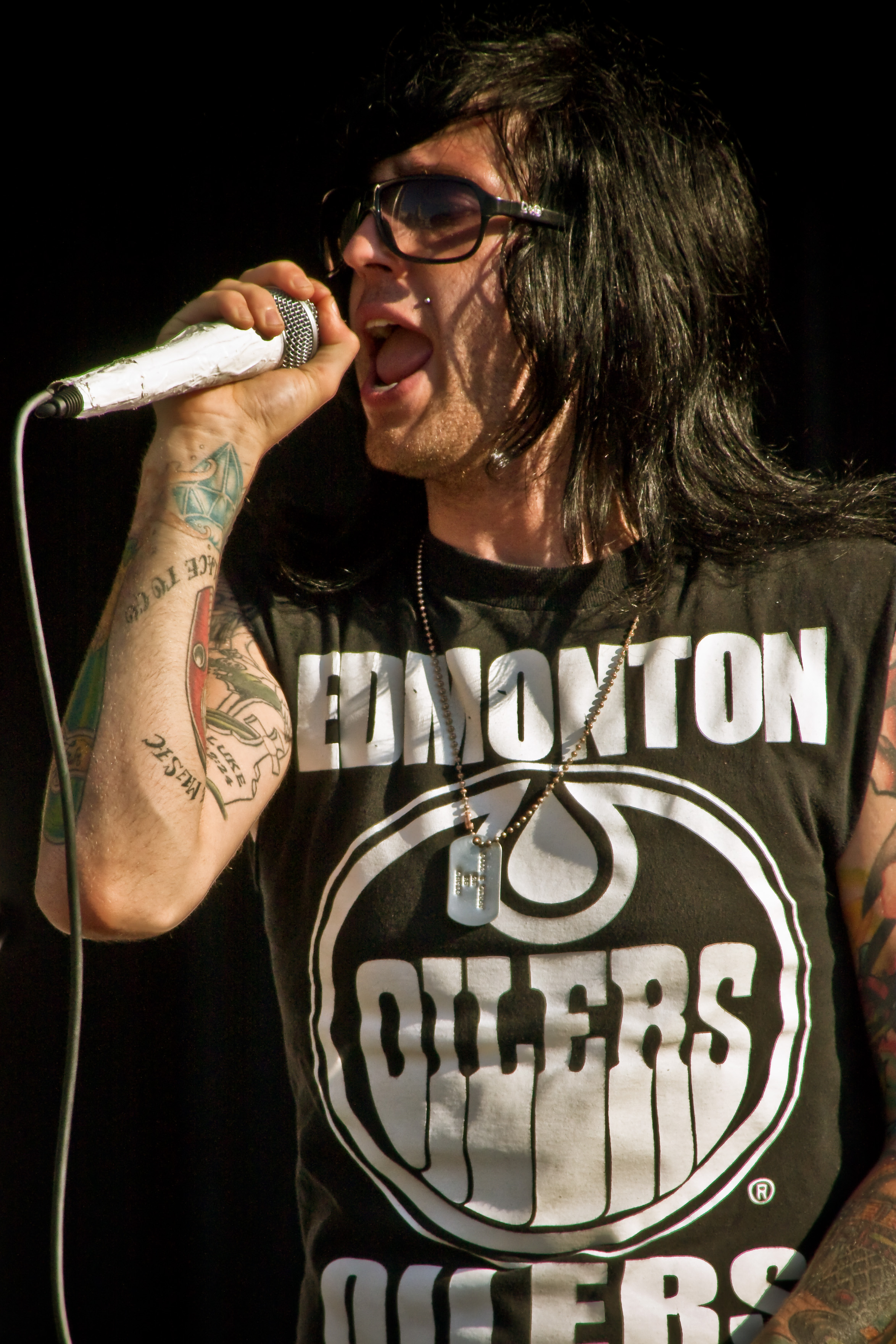
Pat Kordyback

=== 2008–2009: Early days and record deal ===
The band formed roughly two years prior to its 2008 appearance on disBAND under the name Stand By Me.

Basically we played this big showcase during Canadian Music Week, Gene Simmons was there, everyone from Universal. After we played, they brought us all up to a big room and just sat us down and they're like 'Here's the deal'.

— Miles Holmwood

After meeting disBAND Guru Greig Nori, Stand By Me was advised to change their name due to copyright issues. Turn It Up was chosen. Later, in order to perform several shows in Toronto, Ontario, Universal Music Canada A&R rep Mark Spicoluk advised the band to change their name again, and the band chose the name Stereos. After receiving the thumbs up from the judges from disBand, Stereos went to a large gig to receive a contract from the President of Universal Music Canada and judged by Kiss member Gene Simmons.

On June 4, their music video for "Summer Girl" debuted on the MuchMusic Countdown. The single also debuted at #2 on the Canadian Hot 100 based on the large number of downloads in the first week and in June 2009, Stereos' debut single, "Summer Girl" sold over 120,000 units in Canada and has been certified CRIA double platinum in digital downloads. The band released their self-titled debut album Stereos on October 20, 2009, and was certified gold by the CRIA in January 2010 with sales of over 40,000 copies. The band started their first ever Cross-Canada tour on November 7, 2009, in Windsor, Ontario.

=== 2010–2011: The Show Must Go...On The Road Tour and second studio album ===
Stereos went across Canada in March and April 2010 on Hedley's The Show Must Go...On The Road Tour. Hedley announced the tour in support of their new album The Show Must Go which was released November 17, 2009. "Fefe Dobson and Stereos were along for the whole trek, while Faber Drive and Boys Like Girls joined on select dates."

In March 2010, the band received two Juno Award nominations which were for Best New Artist, and Best Pop Album. They released two other singles that charted moderately, "Turn It Up" peaked at #31, and "Butterflies" at #51. The song "She Only Likes Me When She's Drunk" failed to chart.

Stereos' second album, titled Uncontrollable was released on December 14, 2010. The first single from the album, "Uncontrollable" was released on October 25, 2010 and peaked at #42 on the Canadian Hot 100. The second single, "Body Move" was released in February 2011, just before their cross Canada tour. In mid April the band's drummer, Aaron, sustained a broken hand, leaving him unable to perform, causing the band to cancel their remaining shows.

=== 2019–present: 10-Year reunion and return from hiatus ===
On March 10, 2019, Stereos announced a 10-year reunion show to take place on May 11, 2019, at Toronto's Rec Room during Canadian Music Week on their Facebook page, which ended up selling out. A second 10-year reunion show in the band's hometown of Edmonton took place on August 16, 2019 and also sold out. On October 20, 2019, the band announced they were officially back in the studio recording new material. On February 3, 2020, the band announced via their social media pages that they would be releasing a brand new single, titled "Sunset Gold" which was released on February 28, 2020.

In 2023, they participated in an all-star recording of Serena Ryder's single "What I Wouldn't Do", which was released as a charity single to benefit Kids Help Phone's Feel Out Loud campaign for youth mental health.

== Discography ==
=== Studio albums ===
List of albums, with selected chart positions and certifications
Title	Album details	Peak chart positions	Certifications
Title	Album details	CAN	Certifications
Stereos	Released: October 20, 2009; Label: Universal Music Canada; Format: CD, digital download	3	MC: Gold
Uncontrollable	Released: December 14, 2010; Label: Universal Music Canada; Format: CD, digital download	60	
Cheap Thrills	Released: November 4, 2022; Label: Sonny Boy Records; Format: CD, digital download	—	

=== Singles ===
List of singles, with selected chart positions and certifications
Title	Year	Peak chart positions			Certifications	Album
Title	Year	CAN	CAN CHR	CAN HAC	Certifications	Album
"Summer Girl"	2009	2	7	9	MC: 2× Platinum	Stereos
"Throw Ya Hands Up" (feat. Jhevon Paris)	2009	3	11	14	MC: 2× Platinum	Stereos
"Turn It Up"	2009	30	13	16	MC: Platinum	Stereos
"Butterflies"	2010	51	33	32	MC: Gold	Stereos
"She Only Likes Me When She's Drunk"	2010	—	—	—		Stereos
"Uncontrollable"	2010	42	21	32		Uncontrollable
"Body Move"	2011	—	33	—		Uncontrollable
"Sunset Gold"	2020	12	24	11		Cheap Thrills
"Look Good"	2021	33	23	—		Cheap Thrills
"Glory Days"	2021	—	—	—		Cheap Thrills
"Hands Off You"	2021	16	28	—		Cheap Thrills
"Way Back Home"	2021	—	—	—		Cheap Thrills
"Summer Girl (OurVersion)"	2024	—	—	—		
"—" denotes releases that did not chart.

=== Promotional singles ===
List of promotional singles, with selected chart positions
Title	Year	Peak chart positions	Album
Title	Year	CAN	Album
"I Like It (Like That)"	2010	—	Stereos
"Like U Do"	2010	—	Stereos
"Paid Like This"	2010	—	Stereos
"La Dreamin'"	2010	75	Non-album single
"Out of Love Song/Back Home"	2010	—	Non-album single
"—" denotes releases that did not chart.

=== Other charted songs ===
List of other charted songs, with selected chart positions
Title	Year	Peak chart positions	Album
Title	Year	CAN	Album
"Bye Bye Baby"	2009	43	Stereos
"Get with You" (feat. Far East Movement)	2009	31	Stereos
"Jet Black Cadillac"	2009	70	Stereos

=== Music videos ===
"Summer Girl" — 2009
"Throw Ya Hands Up" — 2009
"Turn It Up" — 2009
"Butterflies" — 2010
"Wingin' It Theme" — 2010
"She Only Likes Me When She's Drunk" — 2010
"Uncontrollable" — 2010
"Body Move" — 2011
