= One Direction discography =

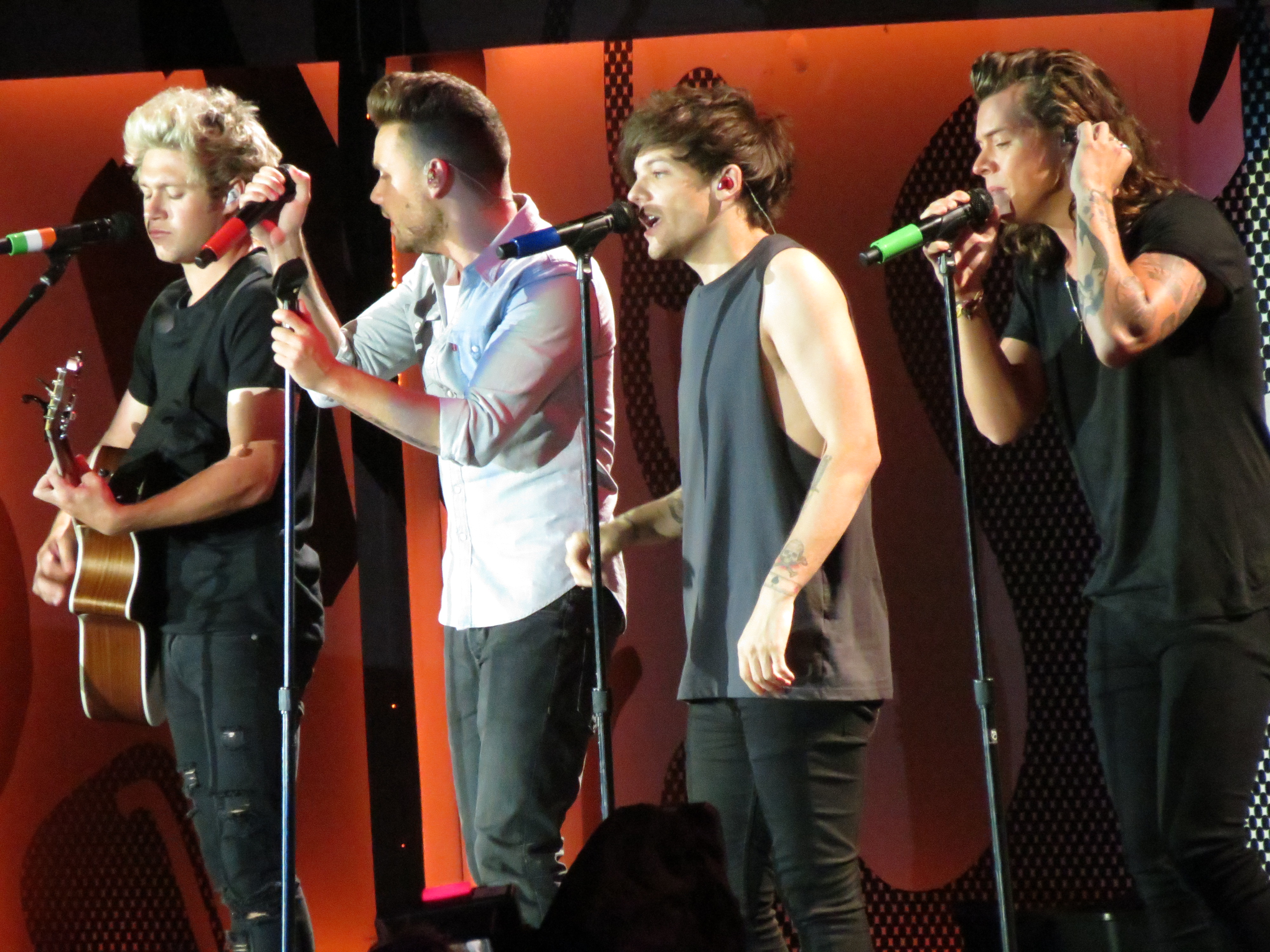
- One Direction performing at Soldier Field in Chicago on 23 August 2015
- Studio albums: 5
- Extended plays: 10
- Singles: 17
- Video albums: 2
- Music videos: 17

The English–Irish boy band One Direction have released five studio albums, ten extended plays, seventeen singles (including two charity singles), two video albums, and seventeen music videos. They signed with Simon Cowell's record label Syco Records after being formed and finishing third in the seventh series of British television singing competition The X Factor in 2010. They subsequently signed in North America with Columbia Records. One Direction: This Is Us, a 3D documentary concert film was released on 29 August 2013 in the United Kingdom and 30 August 2013 in the United States. The film captures the band on the road during the Take Me Home Tour and documents their origins and rise to fame.

The group's debut studio album Up All Night was released on 18 November 2011. It topped the charts in sixteen countries. The lead single, "What Makes You Beautiful", was an international hit, reaching number one on the UK Singles Chart and number four on the US Billboard Hot 100; it has since been certified four and six times platinum in the US and Australia, respectively. Subsequent singles, "Gotta Be You" and "One Thing", became top ten hits in the UK. The band's second studio album Take Me Home was released 9 November 2012. The record sold 540,000 copies in its first week in the US and went to number-one in thirty-five countries. The album's lead single, "Live While We're Young", became One Direction's highest-peaking song in a number of countries and recorded the highest first-week sales for a song by a non-US artist. "Little Things" and "Kiss You", the succeeding singles, became moderate successes.

One Direction's third studio album, Midnight Memories, was released on 25 November 2013. The album was preceded by its lead single "Best Song Ever" and its critically acclaimed second single "Story of My Life". The album was a commercial success, debuting at number one on the UK Albums Chart and the Billboard 200, making One Direction the first band in history to have their first three albums all debut atop the Billboard 200. With their fourth album, Four, released on 17 November 2014, they extended the record to four consecutive number-one albums. Their next album, Made in the A.M. was released on 13 November 2015 & was preceded by its lead single "Drag Me Down". In October 2015, the band announced the second single from the album, "Perfect". As of May 2022, the band has sold more than 70 million records worldwide and over 21 million in their home country. According to Recording Industry Association of America, One Direction has sold 13.5 million digital singles and 12 million albums in the United States.

== Albums ==
=== Studio albums ===
List of studio albums, with selected chart positions, sales figures and certifications
Title	Album details	Peak chart positions										Sales	Certifications
Title	Album details	UK	AUS	BEL	CAN	IRE	ITA	NZ	POR	SWE	US	Sales	Certifications
Up All Night	Released: 18 November 2011; Labels: Syco, Columbia; Formats: CD, LP, digital download	2	1	7	1	1	1	1	3	1	1	UK: 1,180,000 (Note: United Kingdom sales figures for Up All Night as of July 2020.); US: 2,095,000 (Note: United States sales figures for Up All Night as of June 2016.)	BPI: 4× Platinum; AFP: Platinum; ARIA: 5× Platinum; FIMI: 2× Platinum; GLF: Platinum; IRMA: 3× Platinum; MC: 6× Platinum; RIAA: 3× Platinum; RMNZ: 5× Platinum
Take Me Home	Released: 9 November 2012; Labels: Syco, Columbia; Formats: CD, LP, digital download	1	1	1	1	1	1	1	1	1	1	UK: 1,110,000 (Note: United Kingdom sales figures for Take Me Home as of July 2020.); IRE: 8,200 (Note: Ireland first-week sales figures for Take Me Home.); US: 2,043,000 (Note: United States figures for Take Me Home as of June 2016.)	BPI: 4× Platinum; AFP: 2× Platinum; ARIA: 3× Platinum; BEA: Gold; FIMI: 3× Platinum; GLF: 2× Platinum; IRMA: 3× Platinum; MC: 3× Platinum; RIAA: 3× Platinum; RMNZ: 4× Platinum
Midnight Memories	Released: 25 November 2013; Labels: Syco, Columbia; Formats: CD, digital download	1	1	1	1	1	3	2	1	1	1	UK: 980,000 (Note: United Kingdom sales figures for Midnight Memories as of July 2020.); IRE: 10,400 (Note: Ireland first-week sales figures for Midnight Memories.); US: 1,552,000 (Note: United States sales figures for Midnight Memories as of June 2016.)	BPI: 4× Platinum; AFP: Platinum; ARIA: 3× Platinum; BEA: Gold; FIMI: 3× Platinum; GLF: 2× Platinum; IRMA: 3× Platinum; MC: 2× Platinum; RIAA: 3× Platinum; RMNZ: 3× Platinum
Four	Released: 17 November 2014; Labels: Syco, Columbia; Formats: CD, LP, digital download	1	1	1	1	1	1	1	1	1	1	UK: 706,000 (Note: United Kingdom sales figures for Four as of July 2020.); CAN: 98,000 (Note: Canada sales figures for Four as of January 2015.); US: 1,064,000 (Note: United States sales figures for Four as of June 2016.)	BPI: 3× Platinum; AFP: Platinum; ARIA: 2× Platinum; FIMI: 3× Platinum; GLF: Platinum; MC: Platinum; RIAA: Platinum; RMNZ: 3× Platinum
Made in the A.M.	Released: 13 November 2015; Labels: Syco, Columbia; Formats: CD, LP, digital download	1	2	1	2	1	1	2	1	2	2	UK: 546,000 (Note: United Kingdom sales figures for Made in the A.M. as of July 2020.); US: 853,000 (Note: United States sales figures for Made in the A.M. as of June 2016.)	BPI: 2× Platinum; AFP: Gold; ARIA: 2× Platinum; FIMI: 2× Platinum; GLF: Gold; MC: Platinum; RIAA: 2× Platinum; RMNZ: 3× Platinum

=== Video albums ===
List of video albums, with selected chart positions, sales figures and certifications
Title	Album details	Peak chart positions				Sales	Certifications
Title	Album details	UK	AUS	CAN	US	Sales	Certifications
One Direction: Up All Night – The Live Tour	Released: 28 May 2012; Labels: Syco, Columbia; Format: DVD	6	1	1	1	UK: 61,000 (Note: United Kingdom sales figures for One Direction: Up All Night – The Live Tour as of August 2012.); US: 76,000 (Note: United States sales figures for One Direction: Up All Night – The Live Tour as of June 2012.)	BPI: 2× Platinum; ARIA: 10× Platinum; MC: 6× Platinum; RIAA: 5× Platinum
One Direction: Where We Are – The Concert Film	Released: 1 December 2014; Labels: Syco, Columbia; Format: DVD, Blu-ray	1	1	—	1		BPI: 2× Platinum; ARIA: 4× Platinum; RIAA: Platinum
"—" denotes a recording that did not chart or was not released.

== Extended plays ==
List of extended plays, with selected chart positions
Title	Extended play details	Peak chart positions		Sales
Title	Extended play details	FRA	US	Sales
iTunes Festival: London 2012	Released: 20 September 2012; Label: Syco Records; Format: Digital download, streaming	—	140	US: 17,000 (Note: United States sales figures for iTunes Festival: London 2012 as of June 2016.)
Live While We're Young	Released: 28 September 2012; Label: Syco; Format: Digital download, streaming	73	—	
Best Song Ever (from "This Is Us")	Released: 19 July 2013; Label: Syco; Format: Digital download, streaming	—	—	
Midnight Memories	Released: 7 March 2014; Label: Syco; Format: Digital download, streaming	—	—	
You & I	Released: 23 May 2014; Label: Syco; Format: Digital download, streaming	—	—	
Perfect	Released: 22 October 2015; Label: Syco; Format: Digital download, streaming	—	—	
Acoustic	Released: 23 July 2020; Label: Syco; Format: Digital download, streaming	—	—	
Live	Released: 23 July 2020; Label: Syco; Format: Digital download, streaming	—	—	
Rarities	Released: 23 July 2020; Label: Syco; Format: Digital download, streaming	—	—	
Remixes	Released: 23 July 2020; Label: Syco; Format: Digital download, streaming	—	—	
"—" denotes a recording that did not chart or was not released.

== Singles ==
=== As lead artist ===
List of singles as lead artist, with selected chart positions and certifications
Title	Year	Peak chart positions										Sales	Certifications	Album
Title	Year	UK	AUS	BEL (Fl)	CAN	DEN	IRE	NL	NZ	SWE	US	Sales	Certifications	Album
"What Makes You Beautiful"	2011	1	7	8	7	26	1	63	2	29	4	UK: 2,400,000 (Note: United Kingdom sales figures for "What Makes You Beautiful" as of June 2023.); US: 4,888,000 (Note: United States sales figures for "What Makes You Beautiful" as of June 2016.)	BPI: 4× Platinum; ARIA: 13× Platinum; BEA: Gold; GLF: 4× Platinum; IFPI DEN: Gold; MC: 8× Platinum; RIAA: 4× Platinum; RMNZ: 6× Platinum	Up All Night
"Gotta Be You"	2011	3	—	—	— (Note: "Gotta Be You" did not enter the Canadian Hot 100, but peaked at number 69 on the Hot Canadian Digital Songs Sales chart.)	—	3	—	—	—	— (Note: "Gotta Be You" did not enter the Billboard Hot 100, but peaked at number 24 on the Bubbling Under Hot 100 Singles chart.)	UK: 59,461 (Note: United Kingdom sales figures for "Gotta Be You" as of November 2011.)	BPI: Silver; ARIA: Gold	Up All Night
"One Thing"	2012	9	3	37	17	—	6	72	16	—	39	UK: 154,000 (Note: United Kingdom sales figures for "One Thing" as of August 2012.); US: 1,637,000 (Note: United States sales figures for "One Thing" as of June 2016.)	BPI: Platinum; ARIA: 5× Platinum; GLF: Platinum; MC: 3× Platinum; RIAA: Platinum; RMNZ: 2× Platinum	Up All Night
"More Than This"	2012	86	49	—	—	—	39	—	—	—	—		BPI: Silver; ARIA: Platinum; RMNZ: Gold	Up All Night
"Live While We're Young"	2012	3	2	7	2	4	1	3	1	23	3	UK: 367,000 (Note: United Kingdom sales figures for "Live While We're Young" as of August 2015.); US: 1,383,000 (Note: United States sales figures for "Live While We're Young" as of June 2016.)	BPI: Platinum; ARIA: 3× Platinum; GLF: Platinum; IFPI DEN: Platinum; MC: 2× Platinum; RIAA: Platinum; RMNZ: Platinum	Take Me Home
"Little Things"	2012	1	9	30	20	23	2	—	2	27	33	UK: 1,250,000 (Note: United Kingdom sales figures for "Little Things" as of June 2023.); US: 1,138,000 (Note: United States sales figures for "Little Things" as of June 2016.)	BPI: 2× Platinum; ARIA: 4× Platinum; GLF: Platinum; MC: 2× Platinum; RIAA: Platinum; RMNZ: 2× Platinum	Take Me Home
"Kiss You"	2013	9	13	30	30	24	7	30	13	50	46	US: 959,000 (Note: United States sales figures for "Kiss You" as of June 2016.)	BPI: Platinum; ARIA: 2× Platinum; GLF: Platinum; IFPI DEN: Platinum; MC: 2× Platinum; RIAA: Gold; RMNZ: Platinum	Take Me Home
"One Way or Another (Teenage Kicks)"	2013	1	3	5	9	1	1	1	3	28	13	UK: 505,000 (Note: United Kingdom sales figures for "One Way or Another (Teenage Kicks)" as of August 2015.)	BPI: Platinum; ARIA: 2× Platinum; BEA: Gold; IFPI DEN: Gold; GLF: Gold; MC: Platinum; RIAA: Gold; RMNZ: Platinum	Midnight Memories
"Best Song Ever"	2013	2	4	12	2	2	2	5	3	22	2	UK: 406,000 (Note: United Kingdom sales figures for "Best Song Ever" as of August 2015.); US: 1,275,000 (Note: United States sales figures for "Best Song Ever" as of June 2016.)	BPI: Platinum; ARIA: 3× Platinum; GLF: Gold; IFPI DEN: Platinum; MC: 2× Platinum; RIAA: Platinum; RMNZ: 2× Platinum	Midnight Memories
"Story of My Life"	2013	2	3	3	3	1	1	3	1	8	6	UK: 1,430,000 (Note: United Kingdom sales figures for "Story of My Life" as of June 2023.); US: 2,860,000 (Note: United States sales figures for "Story of My Life" as of June 2016.)	BPI: 3× Platinum; ARIA: 4× Platinum; IFPI DEN: 2× Platinum; GLF: Gold; MC: 4× Platinum; RIAA: 3× Platinum; RMNZ: 4× Platinum	Midnight Memories
"Midnight Memories"	2014	39	45	4	35	2	3	5	3	—	12		BPI: Gold; ARIA: Gold; RMNZ: Platinum	Midnight Memories
"You & I"	2014	19	23	17	78	38	7	32	22	21	68		BPI: Gold; ARIA: Platinum; IFPI DEN: Platinum; RMNZ: Platinum	Midnight Memories
"Steal My Girl"	2014	3	9	15	16	1	3	31	9	18	13	UK: 50,973 (Note: United Kingdom sales figures for "Steal My Girl" as of November 2014.)	BPI: 2× Platinum; ARIA: 3× Platinum; MC: Platinum; IFPI DEN: 2× Platinum; RMNZ: 2× Platinum; RIAA: Gold	Four
"Night Changes"	2014	6	19	— (Note: "Night Changes" peaked at number one on the Ultratip chart.)	20	24	4	48	11	19	31	UK: 16,489 (Note: United Kingdom sales figures for "Night Changes" as of November 2014.); US: 1,010,000 (Note: United States sales figures for "Night Changes" as of June 2016.)	BPI: 3× Platinum; ARIA: 6× Platinum; MC: Platinum; IFPI DEN: 2× Platinum; RMNZ: 3× Platinum; RIAA: Platinum	Four
"Drag Me Down"	2015	1	1	5	4	5	1	5	1	6	3	UK: 1,180,000 (Note: United Kingdom sales figures for "Drag Me Down" as of June 2023.); US: 1,208,000 (Note: United States sales figures for "Drag Me Down" as of June 2016.)	BPI: Platinum; ARIA: 5× Platinum; GLF: Platinum; IFPI DEN: Platinum; MC: 3× Platinum; RMNZ: 3× Platinum	Made in the A.M.
"Perfect"	2015	2	4	9	13	25	1	28	7	12	10	US: 817,000 (Note: United States sales figures for "Perfect" as of June 2016.)	BPI: 2× Platinum; ARIA: 3× Platinum; IFPI DEN: Platinum; MC: 2× Platinum; RMNZ: 3× Platinum	Made in the A.M.
"History"	2015	6	25	44	46	—	8	72	14	63	65	UK: 1,300,000 (Note: United Kingdom sales figures for "History" as of June 2023.)	BPI: 2× Platinum; ARIA: 2× Platinum; IFPI DEN: Gold; MC: Gold; RMNZ: 3× Platinum	Made in the A.M.
"—" denotes recording that did not chart or was not released.

=== As featured artist ===
List of singles as featured artist, with selected chart positions
Title	Year	Peak chart positions									Sales	Notes
Title	Year	UK	AUS	BEL	CAN	DEN	IRE	NL	NZ	US	Sales	Notes
"Heroes" (as part of The X Factor Finalists 2010)	2010	1	—	—	—	—	1	—	—	—	UK: 144,000 (Note: United Kingdom sales figures for "Heroes" as of November 2010.)	A charity single for Help for Heroes.
"Wishing on a Star" (The X Factor Finalists 2011 featuring JLS and One Direction)	2011	1	—	—	—	—	1	—	—	—	UK: 98,932 (Note: United Kingdom sales figures for "Wishing on a Star" as of December 2011.)	A charity single for Together for Short Lives.
"God Only Knows" (as BBC Music and Friends)	2014	20	—	—	—	—	77	—	—	—		A charity single for Children in Need.
"Do They Know It's Christmas?" (as part of Band Aid 30)	2014	1	3	1	8	35	1	4	2	63	UK: 526,000 (Note: United Kingdom sales figures for "Do They Know It's Christmas?" as of December 2017.)	A charity single for the Ebola epidemic.
"—" denotes recording that did not chart or was not released.

=== Promotional singles ===
List of other charted songs, with selected chart positions and certifications
Title	Year	Peak chart positions										Sales	Certifications	Album
Title	Year	UK	AUS	CAN	DEN	IRE	MEX Ing.	NL	NZ	SWE	US	Sales	Certifications	Album
"Diana"	2013	58	— (Note: "Diana" did not enter the ARIA Singles Chart, but peaked at number 2 on the ARIA Digital Track Chart.)	23	1	2	—	3	2	55	11		BPI: Silver; RMNZ: Gold	Midnight Memories
"Strong"	2013	48	—	44	3	22	—	4	1	58	87			Midnight Memories
"Fireproof"	2014	92	—	—	—	—	—	—	—	—	— (Note: "Fireproof" did not enter the Billboard Hot 100, but peaked at number 2 on the Bubbling Under Hot 100 Singles chart.)	UK: 3,723 (Note: United Kingdom sales figures for "Fireproof" as of November 2014.)	BPI: Silver	Four
"Ready to Run"	2014	44	—	60	10	—	46	—	29	58	77	UK: 3,387 (Note: United Kingdom sales figures for "Ready to Run" as of November 2014.)		Four
"Where Do Broken Hearts Go"	2014	47	—	90	—	69	43	—	—	—	88	UK: 3,781 (Note: United Kingdom sales figures for "Where Do Broken Hearts Go" as of November 2014.); US: 37,818 (Note: United States sales figures for "Where Do Broken Hearts Go" as of November 2014.)	BPI: Silver	Four
"18"	2014	45	—	84	—	84	41	—	—	46	87	UK: 4,922 (Note: United Kingdom sales figures for "18" as of November 2014.); US: 38,610 (Note: United States sales figures for "18" as of November 2014.)	BPI: Platinum; AMPROFON: Platinum; ARIA: Gold; RMNZ: Platinum	Four
"Girl Almighty"	2014	65	—	—	—	—	42	—	—	—	— (Note: "Girl Almighty" did not enter the Billboard Hot 100, but peaked at number 12 on the Bubbling Under Hot 100 Singles chart.)	UK: 3,149 (Note: United Kingdom sales figures for "Girl Almighty" as of November 2014.); US: 21,703 (Note: United States sales figures for "Girl Almighty" as of November 2014.)		Four
"Fool's Gold"	2014	74	—	— (Note: "Fool's Gold" did not enter the Canadian Hot 100, but peaked at number 59 on the Hot Canadian Digital Songs Sales chart.)	—	—	—	—	—	—	— (Note: "Fool's Gold" did not enter the Billboard Hot 100, but peaked at number 24 on the Bubbling Under Hot 100 Singles chart.)	UK: 3,551 (Note: United Kingdom sales figures for "Fool's Gold" as of November 2014.); US: 18,645 (Note: United States sales figures for "Fool's Gold" as of November 2014.)	BPI: Silver	Four
"Infinity"	2015	36	22	40	—	38	—	59	28	42	54	AUS: 35,000 (Note: Australia sales figures for "Infinity")	BPI: Silver; ARIA: Gold; RMNZ: Gold	Made in the A.M.
"Home"	2015	96	48	75	—	84	—	—	—	— (Note: "Home" did not enter the Swedish Singles Chart, but peaked at number 12 on the Swedish Heatseeker chart.)	74			Perfect EP
"End of the Day"	2015	73	58	67	—	41	—	96	— (Note: "End of the Day" did not enter the NZ Top 40 Singles Chart, but peaked at number 8 on the NZ Heatseeker chart.)	59	— (Note: "End of the Day" did not enter the Billboard Hot 100, but peaked at number 1 on the Bubbling Under Hot 100 Singles chart.)			Made in the A.M.
"Love You Goodbye"	2015	78	75	80	—	45	—	—	—	71	— (Note: "Love You Goodbye" did not enter the Billboard Hot 100, but peaked at number 10 on the Bubbling Under Hot 100 Singles chart.)		BPI: Silver; AMPROFON: Gold	Made in the A.M.
"What a Feeling"	2015	90	77	—	—	59	—	94	—	74	— (Note: "What a Feeling" did not enter the Billboard Hot 100, but peaked at number 9 on the Bubbling Under Hot 100 Singles chart.)		RMNZ: Gold	Made in the A.M.
"—" denotes recording that did not chart or was not released.

== Other charted and certified songs ==
List of other charted songs, with selected chart positions and certifications
Title	Year	Peak chart positions										Certifications	Album
Title	Year	UK	AUS	CAN	EU	IRE	ITA	KOR	MEX	SWE	US	Certifications	Album
"Na Na Na"	2011	—	86	—	— (Note: "Na Na Na" reached number 20 on Euro Digital Tracks, which differs from the Euro Digital Song Sales chart that aggregated different mixes and versions of a song as one entry.)	27	—	119	—	—	—	ARIA: Gold	Up All Night
"Another World"	2011	85	66	—	—	—	—	34	—	—	—		Up All Night
"Moments"	2011	118	60	87	—	—	—	—	—	—	—	ARIA: Gold	Up All Night
"Stand Up"	2011	—	80	—	—	—	—	—	—	—	—		Up All Night
"Up All Night"	2011	—	—	—	—	—	—	60	—	—	— (Note: "Up All Night" did not enter the Billboard Hot 100, but peaked at number 13 on the Bubbling Under Hot 100 Singles chart.)		Up All Night
"I Should Have Kissed You"	2012	55	71	—	—	—	—	—	—	—	—		Up All Night
"Everything About You"	2012	—	—	—	—	—	—	—	41	—	—		Up All Night
"Nobody Compares"	2012	174	—	79	—	—	—	198	—	—	— (Note: "Nobody Compares" did not enter the Billboard Hot 100, but peaked at number 8 on the Bubbling Under Hot 100 Singles chart.)		Take Me Home
"She's Not Afraid"	2012	171	—	89	—	—	—	—	—	—	— (Note: "She's Not Afraid" did not enter the Billboard Hot 100, but peaked at number 3 on the Bubbling Under Hot 100 Singles chart.)		Take Me Home
"Still the One"	2012	197	—	97	—	—	—	—	—	—	— (Note: "Still the One" did not enter the Billboard Hot 100, but peaked at number 15 on the Bubbling Under Hot 100 Singles chart.)		Take Me Home
"Heart Attack"	2012	—	—	100	—	—	—	39	—	—	— (Note: "Heart Attack" did not enter the Billboard Hot 100, but peaked at number 4 on the Bubbling Under Hot 100 Singles chart.)		Take Me Home
"Rock Me"	2012	—	—	— (Note: "Rock Me" did not enter the Canadian Hot 100, but peaked at number 69 on the Hot Canadian Digital Songs Sales chart.)	—	—	—	122	—	—	98	BPI: Silver; AMPROFON: Gold; IFPI DEN: Gold; RMNZ: Gold	Take Me Home
"They Don't Know About Us"	2012	—	—	— (Note: "They Don't Know About Us" did not enter the Canadian Hot 100, but peaked at number 74 on the Hot Canadian Digital Songs Sales chart.)	—	—	—	102	—	—	— (Note: "They Don't Know About Us" did not enter the Billboard Hot 100, but peaked at number 14 on the Bubbling Under Hot 100 Singles chart.)	BPI: Silver; GLF: Gold; IFPI DEN: Platinum; RMNZ: Platinum	Take Me Home
"Last First Kiss"	2012	—	—	—	—	—	—	5	—	—	— (Note: "Last First Kiss" did not enter the Billboard Hot 100, but peaked at number 19 on the Bubbling Under Hot 100 Singles chart.)		Take Me Home
"Loved You First"	2012	—	—	—	—	—	—	36	—	—	— (Note: "Loved You First" did not enter the Billboard Hot 100, but peaked at number 21 on the Bubbling Under Hot 100 Singles chart.)		Take Me Home
"I Would"	2012	—	—	—	—	—	—	126	—	—	— (Note: "I Would" did not enter the Billboard Hot 100, but peaked at number 23 on the Bubbling Under Hot 100 Singles chart.)	BPI: Silver	Take Me Home
"C'mon, C'mon"	2012	—	—	—	—	—	—	107	—	—	— (Note: "C'mon, C'mon" did not enter the Billboard Hot 100, but peaked at number 25 on the Bubbling Under Hot 100 Singles chart.)		Take Me Home
"Back for You"	2012	—	—	—	—	—	—	116	—	—	—		Take Me Home
"Summer Love"	2012	—	—	—	—	—	—	131	—	—	—		Take Me Home
"Change My Mind"	2012	—	—	—	—	—	—	134	—	—	—		Take Me Home
"Over Again"	2012	—	—	—	—	—	—	139	—	—	—		Take Me Home
"Don't Forget Where You Belong"	2013	21	—	—	18	50	51	90	—	—	—	RMNZ: Gold	Midnight Memories
"Half a Heart"	2013	108	—	— (Note: "Half a Heart" did not enter the Canadian Hot 100, but peaked at number 74 on the Hot Canadian Digital Songs Sales chart.)	—	82	—	—	—	—	—	RMNZ: Gold	Midnight Memories
"Alive"	2013	150	—	—	—	—	—	—	—	—	—		Midnight Memories
"Better Than Words"	2013	185	—	—	—	—	—	195	—	—	—		Midnight Memories
"Does He Know?"	2013	130	—	—	—	—	—	—	—	—	—		Midnight Memories
"Happily"	2013	120	—	—	—	—	—	86	—	35	— (Note: "Happily" did not enter the Billboard Hot 100, but peaked at number 16 on the Bubbling Under Hot 100 Singles chart.)		Midnight Memories
"Little Black Dress"	2013	177	—	—	—	—	—	—	—	—	—		Midnight Memories
"Little White Lies"	2013	149	—	—	—	—	—	200	—	—	—		Midnight Memories
"Right Now"	2013	173	—	—	—	—	—	186	—	—	—	BPI: Silver	Midnight Memories
"Through the Dark"	2013	175	—	—	—	—	—	—	—	—	—		Midnight Memories
"Why Don't We Go There"	2013	156	—	—	—	—	—	—	—	—	—		Midnight Memories
"Stockholm Syndrome"	2014	107	—	—	—	—	—	—	—	31	99	BPI: Silver; RMNZ: Gold	Four
"Change Your Ticket"	2014	149	—	—	—	—	—	50	—	—	— (Note: "Change Your Ticket" did not enter the Billboard Hot 100, but peaked at number 20 on the Bubbling Under Hot 100 Singles chart.)		Four
"Clouds"	2014	183	—	—	—	—	—	—	—	—	— (Note: "Clouds" did not enter the Billboard Hot 100, but peaked at number 17 on the Bubbling Under Hot 100 Singles chart.)		Four
"Illusion"	2014	181	—	—	—	—	—	—	—	—	— (Note: "Illusion" did not enter the Billboard Hot 100, but peaked at number 23 on the Bubbling Under Hot 100 Singles chart.)		Four
"No Control"	2014	135	—	—	—	—	—	—	— (Note: "No Control" did not enter the Mexico Airplay chart, but peaked at number 27 on the Mexico Ingles Airplay chart.)	—	— (Note: "No Control" did not enter the Billboard Hot 100, but peaked at number 7 on the Bubbling Under Hot 100 Singles chart.)	BPI: Silver; AMPROFON: Gold; RMNZ: Gold	Four
"Once in a Lifetime"	2014	170	—	—	—	—	—	—	—	—	— (Note: "Once in a Lifetime" did not enter the Billboard Hot 100, but peaked at number 13 on the Bubbling Under Hot 100 Singles chart.)		Four
"Spaces"	2014	160	—	—	—	—	—	—	—	—	— (Note: "Spaces" did not enter the Billboard Hot 100, but peaked at number 12 on the Bubbling Under Hot 100 Singles chart.)		Four
"Act My Age"	2014	140	—	—	—	—	—	—	—	—	— (Note: "Act My Age" did not enter the Billboard Hot 100, but peaked at number 8 on the Bubbling Under Hot 100 Singles chart.)		Four
"If I Could Fly"	2015	79	—	70	—	53	26	—	—	58	83	BPI: Silver; AMPROFON: Gold; FIMI: Gold; RMNZ: Gold	Made in the A.M.
"Olivia"	2015	72	—	84	—	55	—	—	—	76	87	BPI: Silver; RMNZ: Gold	Made in the A.M.
"A.M."	2015	83	—	81	—	62	38	—	—	78	94	BPI: Silver; AMPROFON: Gold	Made in the A.M.
"Never Enough"	2015	89	—	100	—	65	49	—	—	89	100		Made in the A.M.
"Temporary Fix"	2015	86	—	—	—	69	—	—	—	96	96		Made in the A.M.
"Hey Angel"	2015	96	—	98	—	76	48	—	—	99	— (Note: "Hey Angel" did not enter the Billboard Hot 100, but peaked at number 6 on the Bubbling Under Hot 100 Singles chart.)		Made in the A.M.
"I Want to Write You a Song"	2015	103	—	97	—	77	—	—	—	94	— (Note: "I Want to Write You a Song" did not enter the Billboard Hot 100, but peaked at number 2 on the Bubbling Under Hot 100 Singles chart.)		Made in the A.M.
"Wolves"	2015	99	—	—	—	78	—	—	—	— (Note: "Wolves" did not enter the Swedish Singles Chart, but peaked at number two on the Swedish Heatseeker chart.)	— (Note: "Wolves" did not enter the Billboard Hot 100, but peaked at number 3 on the Bubbling Under Hot 100 Singles chart.)		Made in the A.M.
"Walking in the Wind"	2015	104	—	—	—	79	—	—	—	— (Note: "Walking in the Wind" did not enter the Swedish Singles Chart, but peaked at number three on the Swedish Heatseeker chart.)	— (Note: "Walking in the Wind" did not enter the Billboard Hot 100, but peaked at number 12 on the Bubbling Under Hot 100 Singles chart.)		Made in the A.M.
"Long Way Down"	2015	106	—	—	—	99	—	—	—	— (Note: "Long Way Down" did not enter the Swedish Singles Chart, but peaked at number one on the Swedish Heatseeker chart.)	— (Note: "Long Way Down" did not enter the Billboard Hot 100, but peaked at number 13 on the Bubbling Under Hot 100 Singles chart.)		Made in the A.M.
"—" denotes recording that did not chart or was not released.

== Music videos ==
As lead artist
Title	Year	Director(s)	Ref.
"What Makes You Beautiful"	2011	John Urbano	
"Gotta Be You"	2011	John Urbano	
"One Thing"	2012	Declan Whitebloom	
"More than This"	2012	Andy Saunders	
"Live While We're Young"	2012	Vaughan Arnell	
"Little Things"	2012	Vaughan Arnell	
"Kiss You"	2013	Vaughan Arnell	
"One Way or Another (Teenage Kicks)"	2013	One Direction	
"Best Song Ever"	2013	Ben Winston	
"Story of My Life"	2013	Ben Winston	
"Midnight Memories"	2014	Ben Winston	
"You & I"	2014	Ben Winston	
"Steal My Girl"	2014	Ben Turner; Gabe Turner	
"Night Changes"	2014	Ben Winston	
"Drag Me Down"	2015	Ben Turner; Gabe Turner	
"Perfect"	2015	Sophie Muller	
"History"	2016	Ben Winston; Calvin Aurand; Gabe Turner	

As featured artist
Title	Year	Director(s)
"Heroes" (as part of The X Factor Finalists 2010)	2010	Unknown
"Wishing on a Star" (The X Factor Finalists 2011 featuring JLS and One Direction)	2011	Unknown
"God Only Knows" (as BBC Music and Friends)	2014	Unknown
"Do They Know it's Christmas?" (as Band Aid 30)	2014	Unknown

== See also ==
- List of songs recorded by One Direction
