= List of songs recorded by One Direction =

Songs by British-Irish boy band

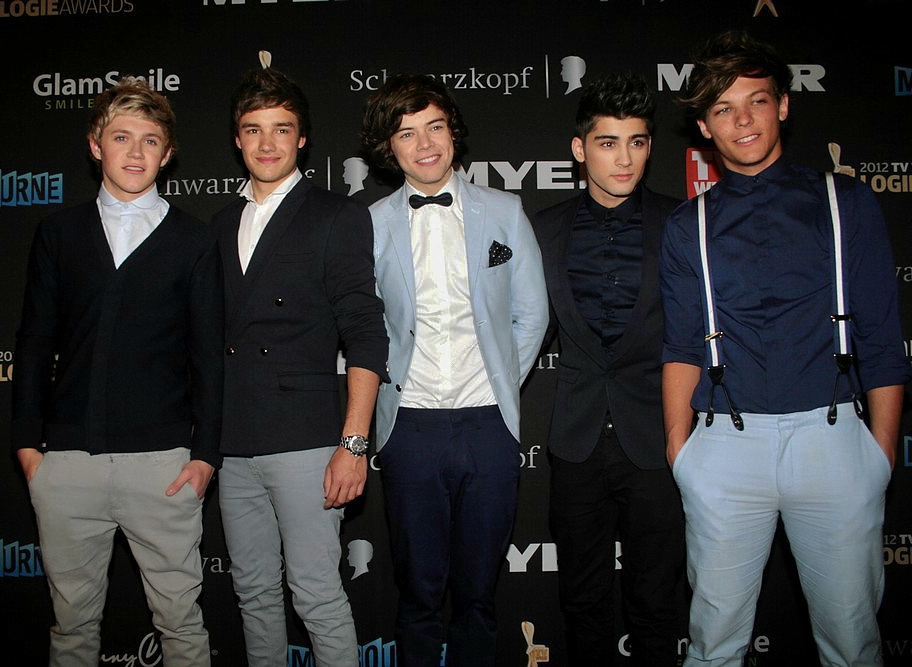
One Direction in 2012

British-Irish boy band One Direction including Harry Styles, Niall Horan, Louis Tomlinson, Liam Payne, Zayn Malik have recorded material for five studio albums. Apart from their album songs, the band has released several non-album singles, such as the charity singles "One Way or Another (Teenage Kicks)" and "God Only Knows".

"Forever young", which would have been released if they had won The X Factor, was their first unofficial single. "What Makes You Beautiful", was released as their debut single and lead single from their debut studio album, Up All Night (2011). They made history as the first U.K. group to bow at number one on the Billboard 200 with a debut album. "Gotta Be You", "One Thing", and "More than This" were the other three singles from their debut album with the first two being top-ten singles in the UK.

The band's second studio album, Take Me Home, was released in November 2012. The lead single "Live While We're Young" was released on 30 September 2012, and recorded the highest opening week sales figure for a song by a non-US artist. "Little Things" and "Kiss You", the succeeding singles, were also successes.

One Direction's third studio album, Midnight Memories, was released on 25 November 2013. The album was preceded by its lead single "Best Song Ever" and its critically acclaimed second single "Story of My Life". The album was a huge commercial success, debuting at number one on the UK Albums Chart and the Billboard 200. Their fourth studio album, Four, was released on 17 November 2014. It reached number one on the UK Albums Chart and the Billboard 200 following its release.

Their fifth studio album, Made in the A.M., released on 13 November 2015, was One Direction's final album before the group's indefinite hiatus in January 2016. "Drag Me Down" served as the lead single from the album.

== Tracks ==
Key
†	Indicates single release
•	Indicates non-album single
	Indicates song written by member(s) of the band

Song	Artist(s)	Writer(s)	Album(s)	Year	Ref.
"18"	One Direction	Ed Sheeran; Oliver Frank	Four	2014	
"A.M."	One Direction	Niall Horan; Liam Payne; Harry Styles; Louis Tomlinson; Ed Drewett; John Ryan; Julian Bunetta	Made in the A.M.	2015	
"Act my Age"	One Direction	John Ryan Julian Bunetta Ed Drewett	Four	2014	
"Alive"	One Direction	Julian Bunetta; John Ryan; Jamie Scott; Louis Tomlinson	Midnight Memories	2013	
"Another World"	One Direction	Achraf Jannusi; Bilal Hajji; Eric Sanicola; Geo Slam; RedOne; Teddy Sky	Up All Night	2011	
"Back for You"	One Direction	Kristoffer Fogelmark; Savan Kotecha; Albin Nedler; Rami Yacoub; Liam Payne; Harry Styles; Louis Tomlinson; Niall Horan	Take Me Home	2012	
"Best Song Ever" †	One Direction	Wayne Hector; John Ryan; Ed Drewett; Julian Bunetta	Midnight Memories	2013	
"Better than Words"	One Direction	Jamie Scott; Julian Bunetta; John Ryan; Liam Payne; Louis Tomlinson	Midnight Memories	2013	
"C'mon, C'mon"	One Direction	Jamie Scott; John Ryan; Julian Bunetta	Take Me Home	2012	
"Change My Mind"	One Direction	Rami Yacoub; Carl Falk; Savan Kotecha	Take Me Home	2012	
"Change Your Ticket"	One Direction	Niall Horan; Zayn Malik; Liam Payne; Harry Styles; Louis Tomlinson; Sam Martin; Julian Bunetta; John Ryan	Four	2014	
"Clouds"	One Direction	Zayn Malik; Liam Payne; Louis Tomlinson; Jamie Scott; Julian Bunetta; John Ryan	Four	2014	
"Diana"	One Direction	Jamie Scott; Julian Bunetta; John Ryan; Liam Payne; Louis Tomlinson	Midnight Memories	2013	
"Does He Know?"	One Direction	Jamie Scott; Julian Bunetta; John Ryan; Liam Payne; Louis Tomlinson	Midnight Memories	2013	
"Don't Forget Where You Belong"	One Direction	Tom Fletcher; Danny Jones; Dougie Poynter; Niall Horan	Midnight Memories	2013	
"Drag Me Down" †	One Direction	Julian Bunetta; Jamie Scott; John Ryan	Made in the A.M.	2015	
"End of the Day"	One Direction	Liam Payne; Louis Tomlinson; Julian Bunetta; Ed Drewett; Jacob Kasher; Wayne Hector; Gamal "LunchMoney" Lewis; John Ryan	Made in the A.M.	2015	
"Everything About You"	One Direction	Steve Robson; Wayne Hector; Harry Styles; Liam Payne; Louis Tomlinson; Niall Horan; Zayn Malik; Nandini Srivastava	Up All Night	2011	
"Fireproof"	One Direction	Julian Bunetta; Louis Tomlinson; Jamie Scott; Liam Payne; John Ryan	Four	2014	
"Fool's Gold"	One Direction	Jamie Scott; Maureen McDonald; Niall Horan; Zayn Malik; Liam Payne; Harry Styles; Louis Tomlinson	Four	2014	
"Forever Young" • (Note: The song is a cover of the Alphaville song that was released as the band's winning single.)	One Direction	Bernhard Lloyd; Marian Gold; Frank Mertens	—N/a	2010	
"Girl Almighty"	One Direction	Julian Bunetta; John Ryan; S. Pages Mehner	Four	2014	
"God Only Knows" •	Brian Wilson, One Direction, and various artists	BBC Music and Friends	—N/a	2014	
"Gotta Be You" †	One Direction	Steve Mac; August Rigo	Up All Night	2011	
"Half a Heart"	One Direction	Steve Robson; Ed Drewett; Lindy Robbins	Midnight Memories	2013	
"Happily"	One Direction	Savan Kotecha; Carl Falk; Harry Styles	Midnight Memories	2013	
"Heart Attack"	One Direction	Rami Yacoub; Carl Falk; Savan Kotecha; Shellback; Kristian Lundin	Take Me Home	2012	
"Heroes" •	The X Factor finalists 2010	David Bowie; Brian Eno	—N/a	2010	
"Hey Angel"	One Direction	Ed Drewett; John Ryan; Julian Bunetta	Made in the A.M.	2015	
"History" †	One Direction	Liam Payne; Louis Tomlinson; Ed Drewett; Wayne Hector; Julian Bunetta; John Ryan	Made in the A.M.	2015	
"Home"	One Direction	Liam Payne; Louis Tomlinson; Jamie Scott	Perfect EP	2015	
"I Should've Kissed You"	One Direction	Steve Robson; Ina Wroldsen	Up All Night	2011	
"I Want"	One Direction	Tom Fletcher	Up All Night	2011	
"I Want to Write You a Song"	One Direction	Ammar Malik; John Ryan; Julian Bunetta	Made in the A.M.	2015	
"I Wish"	One Direction	Rami Yacoub; Carl Falk; Savan Kotecha	Up All Night	2011	
"I Would"	One Direction	Tom Fletcher; Danny Jones; Dougie Poynter	Take Me Home	2012	
"If I Could Fly"	One Direction	Harry Styles; Ross Golan; Johan Carlsson	Made in the A.M.	2015	
"Illusion"	One Direction	Liam Payne; Niall Horan; Jamie Scott; Julian Bunetta; John Ryan	Four	2014	
"Infinity"	One Direction	Jamie Scott; John Ryan; Julian Bunetta	Made in the A.M.	2015	
"Irresistible"	One Direction	Tom Fletcher; Danny Jones; Dougie Poynter; Harry Styles; Liam Payne; Louis Tomlinson; Niall Horan; Zayn Malik	Take Me Home	2012	
"Kiss You" †	One Direction	Cagaanan; Rami Yacoub; Carl Falk; Savan Kotecha; Shellback; Kristian Lundin; Albin Nedler; Kristoffer Fogelmark	Take Me Home	2012	
"Last First Kiss"	One Direction	Abin Nedler; Kristoffer Fogelmark; Rami Yacoub; Carl Falk; Savan Kotecha; Liam Payne; Louis Tomlinson; Zayn Malik	Take Me Home	2012	
"Little Black Dress"	One Direction	Julian Bunetta; John Ryan; Theodore Geiger; Liam Payne; Louis Tomlinson	Midnight Memories	2013	
"Little Things" †	One Direction	Ed Sheeran; Fiona Bevan	Take Me Home	2012	
"Little White Lies"	One Direction	Julian Bunetta; Ed Drewett; John Ryan; Wayne Hector; Liam Payne; Louis Tomlinson	Midnight Memories	2013	
"Live While We're Young" †	One Direction	Rami Yacoub; Carl Falk; Savan Kotecha	Take Me Home	2012	
"Long Way Down"	One Direction	Louis Tomlinson; Liam Payne; Jamie Scott; John Ryan; Julian Bunetta	Made in the A.M.	2015	
"Love You Goodbye"	One Direction	Louis Tomlinson; Julian Bunetta; Jacob Kasher	Made in the A.M.	2015	
"Loved You First"	One Direction	Tebey Ottoh; Julian Bunetta; John Ryan; Tommy Lee James	Take Me Home	2012	
"Magic"	One Direction	Rami Yacoub; Carl Falk; Savan Kotecha	Take Me Home	2012	
"Midnight Memories" †	One Direction	Jamie Scott; Julian Bunetta; John Ryan; Liam Payne; Louis Tomlinson	Midnight Memories	2013	
"Moments"	One Direction	Ed Sheeran; Si Hulbert	Up All Night	2011	
"More than This" †	One Direction	Jamie Scott	Up All Night	2011	
"Na Na Na"	One Direction	Iain James; Savan Kotecha; James Murray; Matt Squire; Mustapha Omer	Up All Night	2011	
"Never Enough"	One Direction	Niall Horan; John Ryan; Julian Bunetta; Jamie Scott	Made in the A.M.	2015	
"Night Changes" †	One Direction	Jamie Scott; Julian Bunetta; John Ryan; Niall Horan; Zayn Malik; Harry Styles; Liam Payne; Louis Tomlinson	Four	2014	
"No Control"	One Direction	Liam Payne; Louis Tomlinson; Ruth-Anne Cunningham; Jamie Scott; Julian Bunetta; John Ryan	Four	2014	
"Nobody Compares"	One Direction	Rami Yacoub; Carl Falk; Savan Kotecha; Shellback	Take Me Home	2012	
"Olivia"	One Direction	Harry Styles; John Ryan; Julian Bunetta	Made in the A.M.	2015	
"Once in a Lifetime"	One Direction	Jamie Scott; Julian Bunetta; John Ryan	Four	2014	
"One Thing" †	One Direction	Rami Yacoub; Carl Falk; Savan Kotecha	Up All Night	2011	
"One Way or Another (Teenage Kicks)" • (Note: The song is a medley of Blondie's "One Way or Another" (1979) and The Undertones' "Teenage Kicks" (1978).)	One Direction	Debbie Harry; Nigel Harrison; John O'Neill	—N/a	2013	
"Over Again"	One Direction	Ed Sheeran; Robert Conlon; Alexander Gowers	Take Me Home	2012	
"Perfect" †	One Direction	Harry Styles; Louis Tomlinson; Julian Bunetta; Jesse Shatkin; Jacob Kasher; John Ryan; Maureen Anne McDonald	Made in the A.M.	2015	
"Ready to Run"	One Direction	Louis Tomlinson; Liam Payne; Jamie Scott; Julian Bunetta; John Ryan	Four	2014	
"Right Now"	One Direction	Ryan Tedder; Harry Styles; Liam Payne; Louis Tomlinson	Midnight Memories	2013	
"Rock Me"	One Direction	Lukasz Gottwald; Henry Walter; Peter Svensson; Allan Grigg; Sam Hollander	Take Me Home	2012	
"Same Mistakes"	One Direction	Steve Robson; Wayne Hector; Harry Styles; Liam Payne; Louis Tomlinson; Niall Horan; Zayn Malik	Up All Night	2011	
"Save You Tonight"	One Direction	RedOne; BeatGeek; Jimmy Joker; Teddy Sky; Achraf Jannusi; Alaina Beaton; Savan Kotecha	Up All Night	2011	
"She's Not Afraid"	One Direction	Jamie Scott; John Ryan; Julian Bunetta	Take Me Home	2012	
"Something Great"	One Direction	Jacknife Lee; Gary Lightbody; Harry Styles	Midnight Memories	2013	
"Spaces"	One Direction	Liam Payne; Louis Tomlinson; Jamie Scott; Julian Bunetta; John Ryan	Four	2014	
"Stand Up"	One Direction	Roy Stride; Josh Wilkinson	Up All Night	2011	
"Steal My Girl" †	One Direction	Wayne Hector; John Ryan; Julian Bunetta; Ed Drewett; Louis Tomlinson; Liam Payne	Four	2014	
"Still the One"	One Direction	Rami Yacoub; Carl Falk; Savan Kotecha; Harry Styles; Liam Payne; Louis Tomlinson	Take Me Home	2012	
"Stockholm Syndrome"	One Direction	Harry Styles; Julian Bunetta; John Ryan; Johan Carlsson	Four	2014	
"Stole My Heart"	One Direction	Jamie Scott; Paul Meehan	Up All Night	2011	
"Story of My Life" †	One Direction	Jamie Scott; Julian Bunetta; John Ryan; Harry Styles; Liam Payne; Louis Tomlinson; Niall Horan; Zayn Malik	Midnight Memories	2013	
"Strong"	One Direction	Jamie Scott; Julian Bunetta; John Ryan; Louis Tomlinson	Midnight Memories	2013	
"Summer Love"	One Direction	Steve Robson; Wayne Hector; Lindy Robbins; Harry Styles; Liam Payne; Louis Tomlinson; Niall Horan; Zayn Malik	Take Me Home	2012	
"Taken"	One Direction	Toby Gad; Lindy Robbins; Harry Styles; Liam Payne; Louis Tomlinson; Niall Horan; Zayn Malik	Up All Night	2011	
"Tell Me a Lie"	One Direction	Kelly Clarkson; Tom Meredith; Shep Solomon	Up All Night	2011	
"Temporary Fix"	One Direction	Niall Horan; Wayne Hector; TMS	Made in the A.M.	2015	
"They Don't Know About Us"	One Direction	Tebey Ottoh; Tommy Lee James; Peter Wallevik; Tommy P Gregersen	Take Me Home	2012	
"Through the Dark"	One Direction	Jamie Scott; Toby Smith; Liam Payne; Louis Tomlinson	Midnight Memories	2013	
"Truly, Madly, Deeply"	One Direction	Trevor Dahl; Toby Gad; Lindy Robbins	Take Me Home	2012	
"Up All Night"	One Direction	Savan Kotecha; Matt Squire	Up All Night	2011	
"Walking in the Wind"	One Direction	Harry Styles; Julian Bunetta; Jamie Scott; John Ryan	Made in the A.M.	2015	
"What a Feeling"	One Direction	Liam Payne; Louis Tomlinson; Mike Needle; Daniel Bryer; Jamie Scott	Made in the A.M.	2015	
"What Makes You Beautiful" †	One Direction	Rami Yacoub; Carl Falk; Savan Kotecha	Up All Night	2011	
"Where Do Broken Hearts Go"	One Direction	Harry Styles; Julian Bunetta; Ruth-Anne Cunningham; Theodore Geiger; Ali Tamposi	Four	2014	
"Why Don't We Go There"	One Direction	Steve Robson; Claude Kelly; Wayne Hector; Louis Tomlinson	Midnight Memories	2013	
"Wishing on a Star" •	The X Factor Finalists 2011 featuring JLS and One Direction	Billie Rae Calvin	—N/a	2011	
"Wolves"	One Direction	Niall Horan; Liam Payne; Will Champlin; Andrew Haas; Ian Franzino	Made in the A.M.	2015	
"You & I" †	One Direction	Jamie Scott; Julian Bunetta; Niall Horan; John Ryan	Midnight Memories	2013	

== Notes and references ==
Notes
