= ITunes Festival: London 2012 (One Direction EP) =

iTunes Festival: London 2012

EP by One Direction
- Released: 20 September 2012
- Recorded: 20 September 2012
- Venue: Roundhouse in London, United Kingdom
- Length: 23:28
- Label: Sony

One Direction chronology
Up All Night (2011)	iTunes Festival: London 2012 (2012)	Take Me Home (2012)

iTunes Festival: London 2012 is the debut and live extended play by English-Irish boy band One Direction. The EP was released on 20 September 2012, via iTunes and contains six songs that the group performed live at the festival.

== Background and recording ==
On 15 May 2012, One Direction was announced as one of the performers for the iTunes Festival which was held at the Camden Roundhouse in London. Harry Styles spoke to the BBC about performing at the event, "Every year we see some of our favourite bands and artists on the bill so to be part of the line up this year is obviously incredibly exciting."

The group performed at the iTunes Festival on 20 September. They performed a handful of songs including "What Makes You Beautiful", "One Thing", "Moments", "More Than This", "Up All Night" and "Na Na Na", which were comprised in the live EP. Other tracks performed at the event that didn't make the final cut for the EP include "Gotta Be You", a cover of "Valerie" by the Zutons, "I Gotta Feeling" by the Black Eyed Peas, "Use Somebody" by King of Leon, "Everything About You" and concluded with "I Want".

== Critical reception ==
Rachel Ward of The Daily Telegraph gave a positive response for the concert stating, "The shrillness of screaming girls, possibly whipped up into hysteria by Harry's preposterously skinny jeans, eventually seemed to shake them up for rousing performances of hits including the synth-drenched 'Everything About You', the gloriously catchy 'What Makes You Beautiful' and a credible cover of the Kings of Leon's rocky 'Use Somebody'." However, she felt that the ballads, "Gotta Be You" and "I Wish" were "mediocre" for the first half of the performance.

== Commercial performance ==
iTunes Festival: London 2012 debuted at number 140 on the US Billboard 200 and sold 17,000 copies.

== Track listing ==
No.	Title	Length
1.	"What Makes You Beautiful"	3:43
2.	"One Thing"	3:28
3.	"Moments"	4:39
4.	"More Than This"	4:04
5.	"Up All Night"	3:44
6.	"Na Na Na"	3:39
Total length:		23:28

== Charts ==
Chart performance for iTunes Festival: London 2012
Chart (2012)	Peak position
US Billboard 200	140

== Release history ==
Release history for iTunes Festival: London 2012
Region	Date	Format	Label	Ref.
Various	20 September 2012	Digital download	Sony	
