= ITunes Festival: London 2012 =

iTunes Festival: London 2012 may refer to:

- The 2012 iTunes Festival
- iTunes Festival: London 2012 (Natalie Duncan EP)
- iTunes Festival: London 2012 (One Direction EP)
