= Up All Night: The Live Tour =

Video by One Direction
- Released: 28 May 2012
- Recorded: 3 January 2012
- Venues: International Centre in Bournemouth, England
- Genre: Pop
- Length: 73 minutes
- Labels: Syco; Columbia
- Director: Andy Saunders
- Producers: Andy Saunders; Tom Bairstaw

Up All Night: The Live Tour is a video album documenting the 3 January 2012 show of English-Irish boy band One Direction's Up All Night Tour. It was released on 28 May 2012 by Syco Music. Filmed at the International Centre in the British town of Bournemouth, the 73-minute recording was directed by Andy Saunders and produced by Saunders and Tom Bairstaw. Up All Night: The Live Tour features concert footage and backstage content.

It attracted positive commentary and global success, having topped the charts in twenty-five countries and selling one million copies by August 2012. The recording additionally obtained multi-platinum certifications from the Australian Recording Industry Association (ARIA), Music Canada (MC), the Syndicat National de l'Édition Phonographique (SNEP), and the Recording Industry Association of America (RIAA).

== Development and release ==
The 73-minute recording was directed by Andy Saunders, and was produced by Saunders and Tom Bairstaw. Security was provided by Preston Mahon and Jag Chagger. Karen Ringland was the band chaperone, and Jon Shone was the musical director. During the concert, Shone additionally performed key boards, Sandy Beales performed bass guitar, Josh Devine performed drums, and Dan Richards performed guitar. Paul Higgins, Richard Griffiths, Harry Magee, Will Bloomfield served as managers, and Marco Gastel assistant. Tom Bairstow carried out the video production, Rob Derbyshire soundtracks, and Rob Arbuckle screen 3D visualisations. Matt English served as show's graphic designer, Helene Horlyck vocal coach, Louise Doyle creative director, Paul Roberts choreographer, Caroline Watson and Lydia Taylor costume stylists, and Crystabel Riley and Lou Teasdale groomers.

Up All Night: The Live Tour was available to pre-order by early April 2012. In support of the release, a preview of the recording, its performance of "Moments", was released on 12 April. A 30-second preview of its "More than This" performance premiered on the CBS entertainment television news show Entertainment Tonight on 9 May. The entire "More than This" performance debuted on YouTube on 11 May, with MTV News editor Jocelyn Vena suggesting that fans would appreciate the recording's sequences. The video album was released on DVD and Blu-ray on 28 May, by Syco Music and Columbia Records. One Direction held a global Twitter viewing party for Up All Night: The Live Tour on 31 May. Utilising the hashtag #1DVDWatchParty, fans had the opportunity to talk to the band directly on Twitter as the group's members and fans watched the recording simultaneously.

== Reception ==
Up All Night: The Live Tour garnered positive commentary and global success, having topped the charts in twenty-five countries and selling one million copies by August 2012. A Yahoo! contributor favoured the concert's acoustic performances as showcasing the members' individual tones and vocal prowess. Joanne Dorken, writing for MTV News, praised the group's stage presence and the content itself as having "all the thrills and spills you would expect from a 1D concert". She additionally deemed it "a must have for any Directioner", a One Direction fan, as it gives "an up-close-and-personal insight into the world" of the boy band. An editor for Sugarscape shared Dorken's sentiments and summarised it as "all good fun", but was dismayed by the choreography in the "What Makes You Beautiful" performance. The recording reached number six on the United Kingdom's Official Video Chart, and had sold 61,000 units in the United Kingdom by 2 August 2012. In Australia, it debuted at number one on the ARIA DVD chart and was certified six times platinum by the Australian Recording Industry Association (ARIA) for shipments of 90,000 units in its first week of sale. The recording was ultimately certified nine times platinum in Australia for shipments of 135,000 units.

In the United States, Up All Night: The Live Tour debuted at number one on Billboard's Top Music Videos chart with first-week sales of 76,000 copies, surpassing sales of the Billboard 200 number one album, John Mayer's Born and Raised, which sold 65,000 copies. One Direction made US chart history as the feat marks the first time a music DVD had outsold the Billboard 200 number one album. Its opening figure also makes it the highest music DVD debut of 2012 and the second highest debut in the past five years behind Adele's Live at the Royal Albert Hall, which launched at number one in December 2011, with 96,000 copies. In the week ending 27 January 2013, Up All Night: The Live Tour claimed its 30th week on top of the Top Music Videos Chart, which is longer than any other title since the chart originated in March 1995. It surpassed Ray Stevens' Comedy Video Classics, which logged 29 weeks on top in 1993–1994. The recording was ultimately certified five times platinum by the Recording Industry Association of America (RIAA) on 29 May 2013, indicating shipments of 500,000 copies. In Mexico the DVD debuted at number-one of the Music DVD Chart selling over 10,000 copies, being certified Gold in its first week. Two months after its release it had gone on to sell over 40,000 copies and was certified double platinum by Mexican Recording Industry Association (AMPROFON). Up All Night: The Live Tour ended up as the best selling International DVD of the year with sales of 50,000.

== Track listing ==
No.	Title	Writer(s)	Length
1.	"Na Na Na"	Iain James; Savan Kotecha; James Murray; Matt Squire; Mustapha Omer	3:05
2.	"Stand Up"	Roy Stride; Josh Wilkinson	2:53
3.	"I Wish"	Rami Yacoub; Carl Falk; Kotecha	3:35
4.	"Medley: "I Gotta Feeling", "Stereo Hearts", "Valerie", "Torn""	The Black Eyed Peas; David Guetta; Frédéric Riesterer; Travie McCoy; Adam Levine; Benjamin Levin; Brandon Lowry; Ammar Malik; Dan Omelio; Dave McCabe; The Zutons; Scott Cutler; Anne Preven; Phil Thornalley	4:23
5.	"Moments"	Ed Sheeran; Si Hulbert	4:22
6.	"Gotta Be You"	Steve Mac; August Rigo	3.21
7.	"More than This"	Jamie Scott	3:48
8.	"Up All Night"	Kotecha; Squire	3:12
9.	"Tell Me a Lie"	Kelly Clarkson; Tom Meredith; Shep Solomon	3:15
10.	"Everything About You"	Steve Robson; Wayne Hector; Harry Styles; Liam Payne; Louis Tomlinson; Niall Horan; Zayn Malik	3:35
11.	"Use Somebody"	Kings of Leon	4:13
12.	"One Thing"	Yacoub; Falk; Kotecha	3:17
13.	"Save You Tonight"	RedOne; BeatGeek; Jimmy Joker; Teddy Sky; AJ Junior; Alaina Beaton; Kotecha	3:24
14.	"What Makes You Beautiful"	Yacoub; Falk; Kotecha	2:51
15.	"I Want"	Tom Fletcher	3.27
16.	"Documentary Feature"

Special features

- "On Tour with One Direction"
- Music videos of "What Makes You Beautiful", "Gotta Be You", and "One Thing"

== Chart positions ==
=== Weekly charts ===
Chart (2012)	Peak position
Australian DVD Albums (ARIA)	1
Brazilian Music DVD Chart	6
Danish Music DVD (Hitlisten)	1
Dutch Music DVD Chart	1
Finnish Music DVD Chart	1
French Music DVD Chart	1
Hungarian Music DVD Chart	1
Irish Top 10 Music DVDs	1
Italian Music DVD Chart	1
Mexican Music DVD Chart	1
Norwegian Music DVD Chart	1
Polish Albums Chart	1
Portuguese Albums Chart	1
Spanish Music DVD (PROMUSICAE)	1
Swedish Music DVD (Sverigetopplistan)	1
Swiss Music DVD (Schweizer Hitparade)	1
UK Video Charts	6
US Top Music Videos Chart	1

=== Year-end charts ===
Chart (2012)	Position
Australian Music DVD Chart	1
Belgian Music DVD Chart (Wallonia)	4
Brazilian Music DVD Chart	17
Irish Top 20 Music DVDs	2

== Certifications and sales ==
Region	Certification	Certified units/sales
Australia (ARIA)	10× Platinum	150,000^{^}
Canada (Music Canada)	6× Platinum	60,000^{^}
Chile	—	5,000
France (SNEP)	3× Platinum	45,000^{*}
Mexico (AMPROFON)	Diamond	100,000^{^}
Philippines (PARI)	Platinum	15,000^{*}
Portugal (AFP)	2× Platinum	16,000^{^}
Spain (Promusicae)	Gold	10,000^{^}
Sweden (GLF)	Platinum	20,000^{^}
United Kingdom (BPI)	2× Platinum	100,000^{*}
United States (RIAA)	5× Platinum	500,000^{^}
^{*} Sales figures based on certification alone.^{^} Shipments figures based on certification alone.
