= Up All Night (One Direction album) =

Studio album by One Direction
- Released: 18 November 2011
- Recorded: January–October 2011
- Studios: Los Angeles, London and Stockholm
- Genres: Pop; dance-pop; teen pop; pop rock; power pop
- Length: 45:56
- Labels: Syco; Columbia
- Producers: Ash Howes; BeatGeek; Brian Rawling; Carl Falk; Jimmy Joker; Matt Squire; Paul Meehan; Rami Yacoub; RedOne; Richard "Biff" Stannard; Savan Kotecha; Shep Solomon; Steve Mac; Steve Robson; Toby Gad; Tom Meredith

One Direction chronology
Up All Night (2011)	iTunes Festival: London 2012 (2012)

Singles from Up All Night
- 1. "What Makes You Beautiful" Released: 11 September 2011; 2. "Gotta Be You" Released: 11 November 2011; 3. "One Thing" Released: 6 January 2012; 4. "More Than This" Released: 25 May 2012

Up All Night is the debut studio album by English-Irish boy band One Direction, released by Syco Records in November 2011 in Ireland and the United Kingdom, followed by a worldwide release during 2012. Four months after finishing third in the seventh series of British reality singing contest The X Factor in December 2010, One Direction began recording the album in Sweden, the UK, and the United States, working with a variety of writers and producers. The album's lyrical content regards being young, relationships, heartbreak and empowerment.

The album received generally favourable reviews from contemporary music critics, many of whom appreciated the album's combination of melodic song craft and catchy, pop-oriented material that, while slickly produced, avoided the commercial cynicism and adult contemporary posturing of some of their '80s and '90s forebears. The album bowed at number two on the UK Albums Chart and ultimately became the UK's fastest-selling debut album of 2011. Up All Night debuted to number one on the United States Billboard 200, selling 176,000 copies in its first week. Up All Night was an international success, the album topped the charts in sixteen countries. According to the International Federation of the Phonographic Industry (IFPI), Up All Night was the third global best-selling album of 2012 with sales of 4.5 million copies worldwide.

One Direction finished 2012 with two of that year's top five best-selling albums in the United States; Up All Night at number three and their second studio album, Take Me Home, at number five, making the boy band the first act to place two albums in the year-end top five in the Nielsen SoundScan era. In addition, Up All Night became the best-selling album by a group and the third best-selling debut album of 2012. Four singles were released from the album, including the UK Singles Chart top ten hits "What Makes You Beautiful", "Gotta Be You", and "One Thing". To promote the album, the band performed on many TV shows and awards ceremonies, including the 2012 MTV Video Music Awards. Furthermore, One Direction embarked on their first headlining concert tour, the Up All Night Tour. Footage from this concert was recorded and released on a live album, entitled Up All Night: The Live Tour.

== Background and development ==
After being formed and finishing third in the seventh series of The X Factor in 2010, One Direction were signed by Simon Cowell to a £2 million Syco Records record contract. Recording for their debut album began in January 2011, as they flew to Los Angeles to work with Moroccan-Swedish producer RedOne. In February 2011, One Direction and nine other contestants from the series participated in the X Factor Live Tour. After the tour concluded in April 2011, the group continued working on their debut album. Recording took place in Sweden, the United States, and the United Kingdom, as One Direction worked with producers Carl Falk, Savan Kotecha, Steve Mac, RedOne, Toby Gad and Rami Yacoub, among others. The album also features songs written by Ed Sheeran, Kelly Clarkson, and Tom Fletcher. In May 2011, Kotecha spoke to Digital Spy, and he elaborated that One Direction were "experimenting" with sounds on their debut album. Kotecha said that he was involved in the "early stages" of producing the record. "The stuff I've heard has been really catchy and everyone loves the guys, so it's just about capturing that in the music, which I think is what they're going to be doing." Sonny Takhar, the chief executive officer of Syco Records, in an August 2011 issue of Music Week, described the recording process as a "very intensive period" for the group. Takhar added the resulting album was one of the best pop records made by Syco Records in the past few years, and that he was confident it would be successful. In November 2011, they signed a record deal with Columbia Records in North America. Steve Barnett, the co-chairman of Columbia Records, said it was not a difficult decision to sign with One Direction. "Other artists in that category had gotten a little older," he said. "I just thought there was a void, and maybe they could seize and hold it."

== Composition ==
"What Makes You Beautiful"
The song has a guitar-based chorus and riff

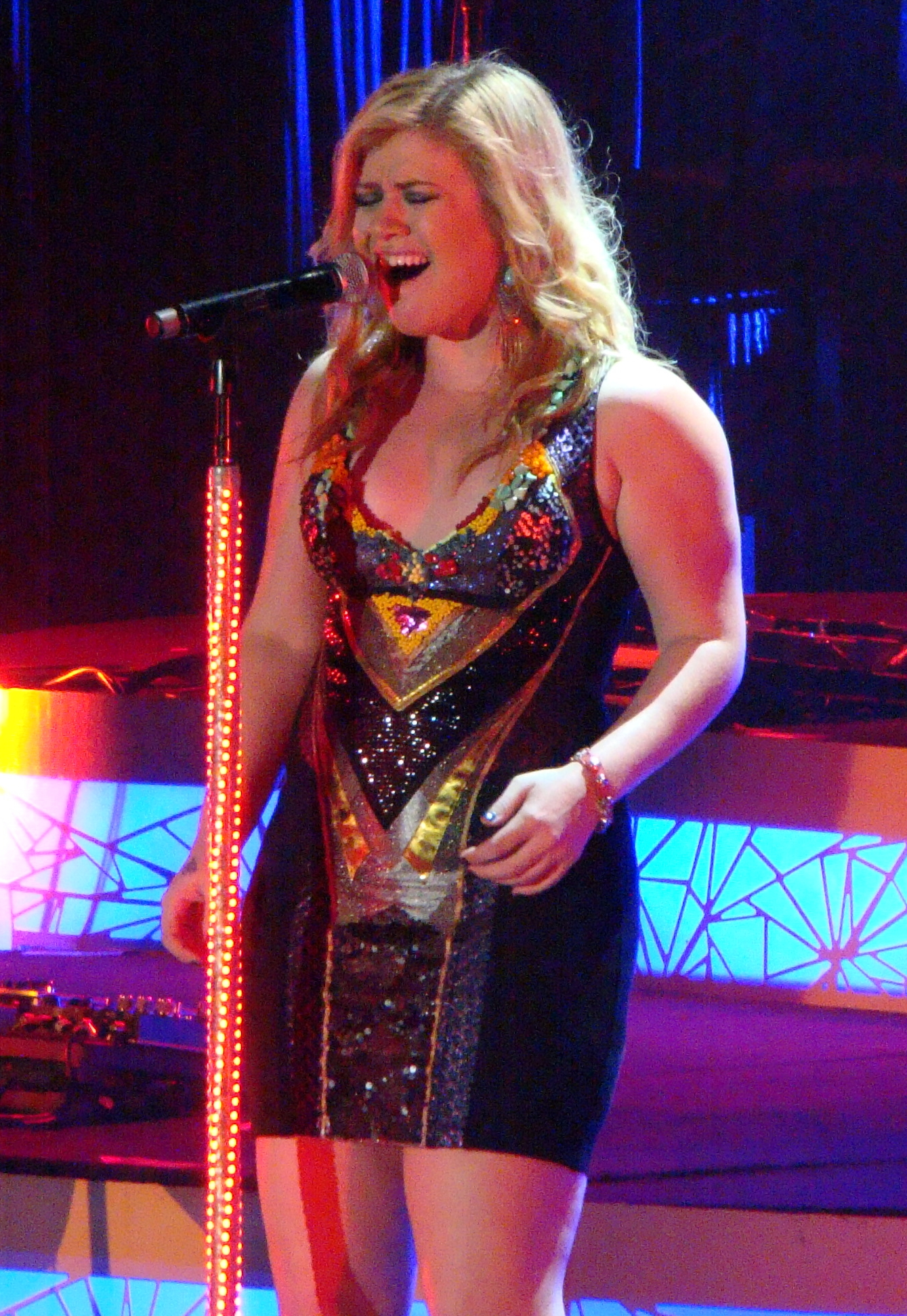
"Tell Me a Lie" was initially co-written by Kelly Clarkson (pictured) for her fifth album Stronger.

Up All Night is predominately a pop music record which orientates into elements of the dance-pop, teen pop, pop rock and power pop genres, with electropop and rock music influences. Instrumentation throughout the record is provided by guitar strings, drums and a piano. The album opens with lead single "What Makes You Beautiful", an uptempo teen pop and power pop song. The opening guitar riff has been noted as similar to that of Grease single "Summer Nights". "What Makes You Beautiful" has a guitar-based chorus; Digital Spy's Robert Copsey likened it to a cross between Pink's "Raise Your Glass" and McFly's "All About You". It also contains cowbell instrumentation, and the middle eight consists of an "oh na na na" hook. The second song on the album, as well as the second single, "Gotta Be You", is a mid-tempo ballad. Set in an orchestral arrangement, its instrumentation includes a guitar, piano lines, and abundant strings. The chorus of the song opens with falsettos that are followed by vocal harmonies.

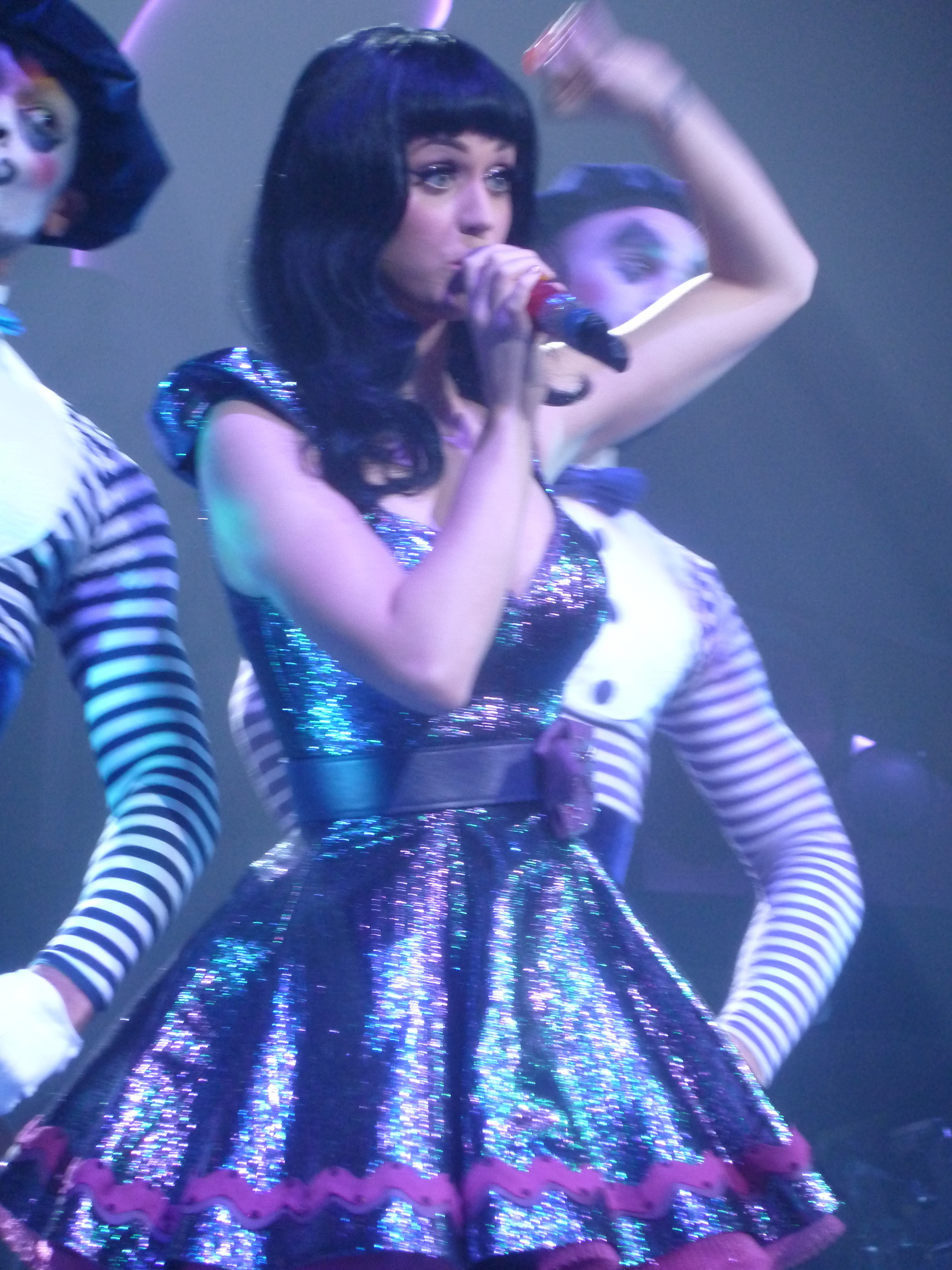
American pop singer Katy Perry is mentioned in the title track.

The third track and third single from the album, "One Thing", is an upbeat pop rock song. The song has a "plucky" guitar riff and a "forceful" chorus with Lewis Corner of Digital Spy dubbing it "arena-ready". The song's melody has been noted for similarities between Backstreet Boys song "I Want It That Way". The fourth song on the album and fourth single, "More than This", is a pop ballad. "More than This" contains sounds of synthesizers. "Up All Night" is an uptempo electropop and dance-pop song. Lyrically, the song is a party-anthem, with the Katy Perry name-check in the chorus being noted by various publications. The sixth cut, "I Wish", is a mid-tempo pop ballad. The song's lyrical tone has been compared to Robyn's "Dancing on My Own". The seventh song, "Tell Me a Lie", is an uptempo pop rock song which features prominent guitar instrumentation and pulsating beats. The song was originally intended for Kelly Clarkson's album Stronger (2011). Clarkson spoke to Capital FM on how she was proud of the result. "It's a really cute song, I love it. I loved that they liked it. They sound really great on it. I already have it – I'm so VIP with my copy on my computer! It does sound really good."

The eighth track, "Taken", is a guitar-driven pop ballad. Lyrically, the song is about heartbreak and relationships. The ninth cut, "I Want", is an uptempo pop rock song which features a prominent piano line. This song was co written by The Vaccines. The tenth song on the album, "Everything About You", is an uptempo teen pop and electro pop song. The eleventh song on the album, "Same Mistakes", is a mid-tempo pop song, which utilizes piano lines, synthesizers and percussions. The twelfth track, "Save You Tonight", is an uptempo synthpop song, and has a retro sound and arrangement. The thirteenth song, final song on the standard edition, "Stole My Heart", is an uptempo dance-pop track which has been noted for similarities between Taio Cruz's hit 2010 single "Dynamite". The first cut on the deluxe edition and overall fourteenth song on the album, "Stand Up", is an uptempo electropop and pop rock song. The second and final song on the deluxe edition, and fifteenth overall, "Moments", is a mid-tempo pop ballad. Instrumentation includes a gently strummed guitar and intermediate piano lines. The song's lyrics revolve around an unrequited love. During the album's UK launch in late 2011, Tomlinson referred to the song as his favourite track on the album.

== Release and promotion ==
Up All Night was made available on CD and digital download in two editions: the deluxe edition, in hard form shape of a yearbook, features a book-sized collection of photos, quotes, and lyrics from the five members of One Direction, and two extra songs: "Stand Up" and "Moments". The album was released by Syco Records in Ireland and the UK on 18 November 2011 and 21 November 2011 respectively. The album was released on 25 November 2011 and 28 November 2011 in Australia and New Zealand respectively. The album was fully released in Europe in early 2012. The album was initially set for release in North America on 23 March 2012 through Columbia Records; however, it was rescheduled for a one-week earlier release on 13 March 2012 with Columbia Records releasing a statement: "due to overwhelming fan demand, their debut album will be released one week early on 13 March 2012."

For the North American release on 13 March 2012, Columbia Records executives used social media to shape its marketing campaign. Columbia Records co-chairman Steve Barnett and his team decided to reverse the usual pattern of releasing a single on the radio. Instead, the label mounted a four-month marketing campaign aimed at building a fan base through social media before a single was ever released or played on the radio. The social media campaign asked fans to sign petitions and to enter video competitions to win a concert in their town. The campaign was a success as One Direction's Facebook followers in the United States rose from 40,000 to 400,000. "What Makes You Beautiful" sold more than 131,000 copies in its first week, even though it had yet to be played on the radio. Radio programmers were flooded with calls from fans. Johnny Wright, who managed New Kids on the Block, Backstreet Boys and 'N Sync, said: "Now they are calling the radio station, and the radio station is scratching its head, saying, 'We don't even have that record yet,’. It's almost like the return of The Beatles. I call it hype, but it's positive hype because it's all real. It's not manufactured. No one paid these kids."

=== Live performances ===
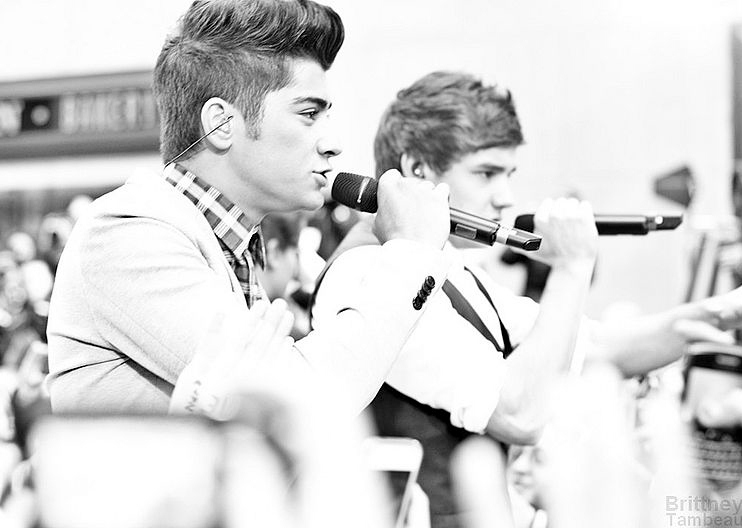
Malik and Payne performing "What Makes You Beautiful" at the Rockefeller Center on 12 March 2012

One Direction performed "What Makes You Beautiful" on Red or Black? on 10 September 2011. The performance started with hosts Ant & Dec announcing that the band was supposedly running late for their appearance, and cut to a video of One Direction boarding a London Tube carriage full of fans, as the studio version of the song began playing. Each fan on the tube was given a numbered ticket. The band and fans disembarked the tube and made their way to the television studio, where the remainder of the song was sung live. After the song, Styles caught a numbered ticket raining onstage. The number corresponded to a ticket held by a fan from the tube; the colour of the fan's shirt was the correct answer for the Red or Black? challenge. The band performed "What Makes You Beautiful" and its B-side, "Na Na Na", at the BBC Radio 1 Teen Awards on 9 October 2011. The band also performed the song to open telethon Children in Need 2011 on 19 November 2011. One Direction performed "Gotta Be You", "One Thing", and "What Makes You Beautiful" at Capital FM's Jingle Bell Ball on 4 December 2011, at The O_{2} Arena. They performed a medley of "She Makes Me Wanna" and "What Makes You Beautiful" with JLS on The X Factor's eighth series final on 10 December 2011. The group performed "One Thing" and "What Makes You Beautiful" on Dancing on Ice on 5 February 2012.

In Italy, the group performed "What Makes You Beautiful" at the 2012 Sanremo Music Festival on 14 February 2012. In France, they performed "What Makes You Beautiful" and "One Thing" on Le Grand Journal on 22 February 2012. In the United States, One Direction performed "What Makes You Beautiful", "More than This" and "One Thing" on The Today Show at the Rockefeller Center on 12 March 2012. An estimated 15,000 fans descended on the plaza. They also performed "What Makes You Beautiful" at the 2012 Kids' Choice Awards on 31 March 2012. One Direction performed "What Makes You Beautiful" and "One Thing" on comedy television show Saturday Night Live and also appeared in a comedy sketch with Sofía Vergara on 7 April 2012. In Australia, they performed "One Thing" and "What Makes You Beautiful" at the 54th Logie Awards, where they also presented an award for "Most Popular New Female Talent" on 15 April 2012. On 12 August 2012, One Direction performed "What Makes You Beautiful" at the 2012 Summer Olympics closing ceremony in London, which represented the handover to Rio de Janeiro as the host of the 2016 Summer Olympics.

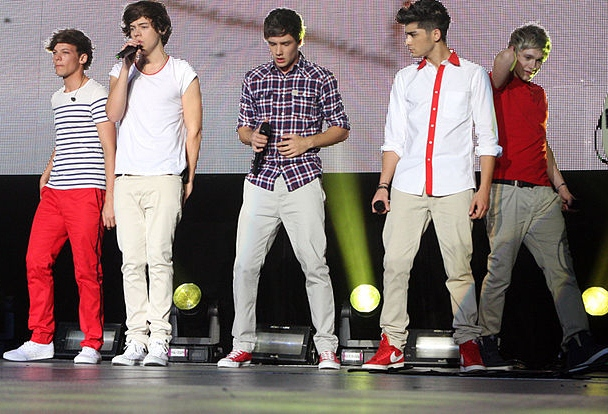
One Direction performing in Sydney during their Up All Night Tour.

=== Tour ===
One Direction's debut headline UK concert tour, the Up All Night Tour, was officially announced on 27 September 2011. The tour began on 18 December 2011 in Watford, England and ended 26 January 2012 in Belfast, Northern Ireland. Shows in the UK and Ireland were an instant success—many rumored to have sold out in under 10 seconds. In February 2012, One Direction announced an Australasia leg, the tour dates set for April 2012, set to visit cities Sydney, Brisbane, Melbourne, Auckland and Wellington. Once the first leg of the tour was complete, the band joined Big Time Rush as an opening act on the Better With U Tour. On 21 March 2012, One Direction announced an extended North American leg of the tour. The North American leg was set to start on 24 May 2012 and comprise 26 shows. Shortly after the announcement, British recording artist Olly Murs was confirmed to be the opening act for select dates on tour. On the tour, One Direction covered Kings of Leon's "Use Somebody", Gym Class Heroes' "Stereo Hearts", The Zutons' "Valerie", Ednaswap's "Torn" and The Black Eyed Peas' "I Gotta Feeling". A recording of their tour, entitled Up All Night: The Live Tour, was released in late May 2012.

== Singles ==
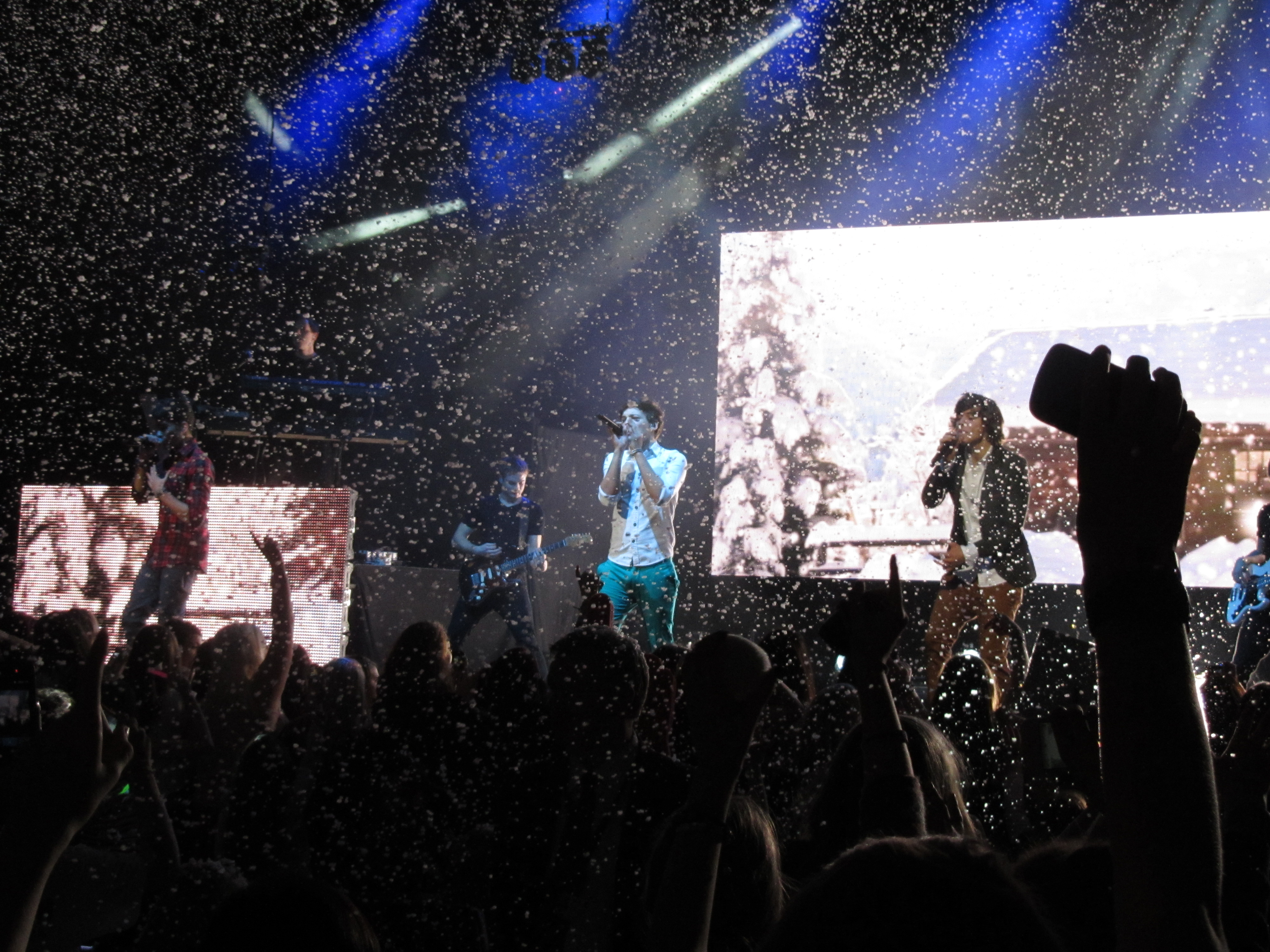
One Direction performing "One Thing" during the Up All Night Tour

Up All Night yielded four singles. The lead single, "What Makes You Beautiful", was released in September 2011 and debuted at number one on the UK Singles Chart, after becoming the most pre-ordered Sony Music Entertainment single in history and selling 153,965 copies in its first week. The single also topped the Irish and Scottish Singles Charts, and reached the top ten on the Australian and New Zealand Singles Charts, Flemish Ultratop 50, Canadian Hot 100, Japan Hot 100 and the United States Billboard Hot 100. "What Makes You Beautiful" was released by Columbia Records in the United States on 14 February 2012. In the US, the single became the highest Billboard Hot 100 debut for a British act since 1998, when it debuted at number 28. It peaked at number 4 on the Billboard Hot 100 and also became a chart success on other Billboard charts, reaching the top five on the Pop Songs, Adult Pop Songs, and Hot 100 Airplay charts, whilst topping the Hot Dance Club Songs chart. The track sold 3,881,000 copies in the United States in 2012, becoming the best-selling song by a boy band in digital history. With over 5 million copies sold worldwide, it is among the best-selling singles of all time. At the 2012 BRIT Awards, the song won the BRIT Award for Best British Single.

"Gotta Be You" was released as the album's second single in Ireland and the United Kingdom in November 2011. The second single peaked on both the Irish and UK Singles Charts at number three. "One Thing" was released on 6 January 2012 as the second single in various European countries and in the UK as the third single on 13 February 2012. The song also served as the album's second single in the United States being sent to US contemporary hit radio (CHR) playlists on 22 May 2012. The single peaked at number six and nine on the Irish and UK Singles Charts respectively, becoming the third consecutive top ten single for One Direction in Ireland and the UK. "One Thing" was One Direction's second best-selling song in the UK by August 2012, denoting sales of 154,000 copies. In Australia, One Direction became the second act of 2012 to have two singles in the top ten simultaneously with "One Thing" at number 3 and "What Makes You Beautiful" at number 10. "One Thing" peaked at number 39 on the Billboard Hot 100. The track was certified platinum by the Recording Industry Association of America (RIAA) on 21 September 2012, denoting sales of 1,000,000 copies. "More than This" was confirmed to be released as the fourth single by Sony Music Australia in early May 2012. Released digitally on 25 May 2012, the final single failed to replicate the success of its predecessors, charting in lower regions on the singles charts in Australia, Ireland, and the United Kingdom.

== Critical reception ==
Professional ratings
Aggregate scores
Source	Rating
Metacritic	64/100
Review scores
Source	Rating
AllMusic	3.5/5 stars
Digital Spy	4/5 stars
Entertainment Weekly	B+
The Independent	2/5 stars
MSN Music	4/5
PopMatters	7/10 stars
Rolling Stone	2.5/5 stars
Spin	5/10
USA Today	3/4 stars
Virgin Media	3/5 stars

Up All Night received generally positive reviews from music critics. At Metacritic, which assigns a normalised rating out of 100 to reviews from mainstream critics, the album received an average score of 64, which indicates "generally favourable reviews". AllMusic's Matthew Chisling commended the album for its appeal to the teenage audience, "limitless potential for the time being, this is a perfectly sized, and targeted, collection." PopMatters' Zachary Houle called the album a "laudable addition to the boy band pantheon" and a "well-crafted slice of pop you can pop bubbles to". Digital Spy's Robert Copsey commended the album for "a collection of pg pop rock with killer choruses" and summarised it as "an adorable as expected debut with a surprising amount of bite". Cosmopolitan's Sophie Goddard lauded the album for a collection of "toe-tappers that are just impossible to dislike".

In a detailed review, Jason Lipshutz from Billboard wrote, [Up All Night] demonstrates an originality in sound that was necessary for the revitalization of the boy band movement. The electropop currently dominating Top 40 radio is seamlessly weaved into the pop harmonies made standards by 'N Sync, Backstreet Boys and 98 Degrees—for instance, the title track sounds like a hybrid of Backstreet Boys' "Larger than Life" and an LMFAO song, and even includes a Katy Perry name-check. Up All Night has its ups and downs, but One Direction complete two important tasks on their debut album: the boy band notches a long-lasting hit with "What Makes You Beautiful," and they look forward instead of back. Get ready to hear a lot more of One Direction. Matthew Horton of Virgin Media opined that the album brims with "punchy pop-rock", and considered the dance-orientated "Stole My Heart": "the only misstep, which only reinforces their decision to go pop-rock." MSN Music's Ben Chalk called the album: "manufactured, calculated and commercial", assessing that the resulting album "is a corking pop album". In his review, he also complimented the album for its collection of singles: "'[Up All Night] is a collection of highly polished pop gems, which knows its market and gives it what it wants". Chris Lopez of USA Today wrote that the album is "charmingly innocent" while noting that a majority of the album "emphasizes songs and harmonies over grooves". Judah Joseph of HuffPost commented that "obviously, the five have vocal talent" and that the album "is full of surprisingly varied tracks, songs with British accents that somehow managed to sneak in, and a generally over-romantic cheesiness that can only be attributed to a boy band", ending the review by telling the group "to enjoy the immense worldwide success coming your way".

In less positive reviews, Jody Rosen of Rolling Stone criticised the album for lacking personality. Adam Markovitz of Entertainment Weekly perceived that the album "won't help the group earn much respect in music circles. But if a tween-pop empire is what these boys are after, they're definitely headed in the right direction". The Independent editor Simon Price gave the album two out of five stars, and in an assessment wrote: "the album consists of fifteen installments of inoffensive daytime radio pop, of which half the songs sound like "I Want It That Way" by the Backstreet Boys, the other half like "Free Fallin'" by Tom Petty, it will sell by the zillion."

== Commercial performance ==
The album topped the charts in sixteen countries. Up All Night became the third best selling album of 2012 globally, selling 4.5 million copies. It entered the UK Albums Chart at number two on 27 November 2011, selling 138,631 copies, becoming the UK's fastest-selling debut album of 2011 and also the fastest selling album of 2011 to miss out on the top spot. The album was kept off the top spot by the first week sales of Rihanna's Talk That Talk, which sold 163,819 copies. The album became the sixteenth biggest-selling album in the UK of 2011, with 468,000 copies sold. As of 8 December 2012, the album had sold 777,000 copies in the UK. The record became the fifteenth best-selling album in the UK of 2012, with sales of 372,000 copies. It was certified tripled platinum by the British Phonographic Industry (BPI) in 2013, denoting shipments of 900,000 copies, and quadruple platinum in 2021. As of November 2014, the album has sold 1,086,434 copies in the UK. The record held the runner-up position for four non-consecutive weeks on the Irish Albums Chart, and was the tenth biggest selling album in 2011 in Ireland. After six months in the Irish Albums Chart top twenty, the album peaked at number one in its twenty-seventh week. The album topped the Australian ARIA Chart for five consecutive weeks, and was certified quintuple platinum by the Australian Recording Industry Association (ARIA), denoting shipments of 350,000 units. In New Zealand, the album topped New Zealand Albums Chart for three non-consecutive weeks, and was certified quintuple platinum by Recording Industry Association of New Zealand (RIANZ), denoting shipments of 75,000 units.

The album debuted atop the Italian Albums Chart on the issue dated 16 February 2012. In 2013 it was certified double platinum by Federation of the Italian Music Industry (FIMI), denoting sales of 120,000 units. In Mexico, the album topped the Mexican Albums Chart for twelve non-consecutive weeks, and was finally certified Diamond by the Mexican Recording Industry Association (AMPROFON) in 2019, denoting shipments of 300,000 units. In Canada, the album bowed atop the Canadian Albums Chart with first-week sales of 35,000 copies, which made One Direction the first UK group in Canadian chart history to enter at number one with their debut album, and the first international act to debut at number one in the Nielsen SoundScan era (post 1991) with their debut album. The album has been certified double platinum by Music Canada, denoting shipments of 160,000 units. The album debuted at number one on the United States Billboard 200 chart, selling 176,000 copies in its first week, which made One Direction the first UK group in US chart history to debut at number one with their first album, as well as the first number-one album by a boy band in eleven years, since 'N Sync's Celebrity. They were inducted into the Guinness World Records as a result. The album was certified triple platinum by the Recording Industry Association of America (RIAA) on 26 July 2020, denoting shipments of 3,000,000 copies. Up All Night also became the first album by a boy band to sell 500,000 digital copies in the US by October 2012. The album has sold over 2.05 million copies in the United States as of August 2015.

== Track listing ==
Standard edition
No.	Title	Writer(s)	Producer(s)	Length
1.	"What Makes You Beautiful"	Rami Yacoub; Carl Falk; Savan Kotecha	Yacoub; Falk	3:21
2.	"Gotta Be You"	Steve Mac; August Rigo	Steve Mac	4:06
3.	"One Thing"	Yacoub; Falk; Kotecha	Yacoub; Falk	3:19
4.	"More than This"	Jamie Scott	Brian Rawling; Paul Meehan	3:50
5.	"Up All Night"	Kotecha; Matt Squire	Matt Squire	3:16
6.	"I Wish"	Yacoub; Falk; Kotecha	Yacoub; Falk	3:38
7.	"Tell Me a Lie"	Kelly Clarkson; Tom Meredith; Shep Solomon	Meredith; Solomon	3:19
8.	"Taken"	Toby Gad; Lindy Robbins; Harry Styles; Liam Payne; Louis Tomlinson; Niall Horan; Zayn Malik	Gad	3:59
9.	"I Want"	Tom Fletcher	Richard "Biff" Stannard; Ash Howes	2:55
10.	"Everything About You"	Steve Robson; Wayne Hector; Styles; Payne; Tomlinson; Horan; Malik	Robson	3:39
11.	"Same Mistakes"	Robson; Hector; Styles; Payne; Tomlinson; Horan; Malik	Robson	3:40
12.	"Save You Tonight"	Kotecha; Nadir Khayat; BeatGeek; Jimmy Joker; Teddy Sky; Achraf Jannusi; Alaina Beaton	Khayat; BeatGeek; Joker	3:27
13.	"Stole My Heart"	Scott; Meehan	Rawling; Meehan	3:27
Total length:				45:56

The Souvenir edition bonus tracks
No.	Title	Writer(s)	Producer(s)	Length
14.	"Stand Up"	Roy Stride; Josh Wilkinson	Stannard	2:56
15.	"Moments"	Ed Sheeran; Si Hulbert	Hulbert	4:22
16.	"Another World"	Jannusi; Bilal Hajji; Eric Sanicola; Geo Slam; Khayat; Sky	Khayat	3:25
17.	"Na Na Na"	Iain James; Kotecha; James Murray; Squire; Mustapha Omer	Matt Squire	3:07
18.	"I Should Have Kissed You"	Robson; Ina Wroldsen	Robson	3:36
Total length:				63:23

=== Notes ===
- Tracks 14 and 15 are featured on the limited yearbook edition.
- Tracks 16 and 17 are featured on the Italian special edition.
- Tracks 16, 17 and 18 are featured on the German edition.
- American edition features an alternate mix "Gotta Be You" subtitled "2012 US version" with a length of 4:04.

== Personnel ==
(Credits taken from AllMusic and Up All Night's liner notes.)

- Beatgeek – producer
- Orlando Calzada – mixing
- Tom Coyne – mastering
- Carl Falk – producer
- Matt Furmidge – mixing
- Josh Devine – drums
- Chris Galland – assistant
- Jon Shone – keyboards, various instruments
- Dan Richards – guitar
- Sandy Beales – bass guitar
- Şerban Ghenea – mixing
- Chris Gray – illustrations
- John Hanes – mixing
- Niall Horan – guitar, vocals
- Ash Howes – mixing, producer
- Jimmy Joker – producer
- Savan Kotecha – producer
- Steve Mac – arranger, producer
- Eric Madrid – assistant
- Zayn Malik – vocals
- Manny Marroquin – mixing
- Paul Meehan – producer
- Tom Meredith – producer
- Liam Payne – vocals
- Brian Rawling – producer
- RedOne – producer
- Steve Robson – producer
- Phil Seaford – assistant
- Shep Solomon – producer
- Matt Squire – composer, producer
- Richard Stannard – producer
- Harry Styles – vocals
- Lou Teasdale – hairstylist, make-up
- Louis Tomlinson – vocals
- John Urbano – photography
- Caroline Watson – stylist
- Rami Yacoub – producer
- Avril Mackintosh – vocal recording and Pro Tools editing

== Charts ==
=== Weekly charts ===
Weekly chart performance for Up All Night
Chart (2011–2022)	Peak position
Australian Albums (ARIA)	1
Austrian Albums (Ö3 Austria)	18
Belgian Albums (Ultratop Flanders)	7
Belgian Albums (Ultratop Wallonia)	27
Brazilian Albums (ABPD)	6
Canadian Albums (Billboard)	1
Czech Albums (ČNS IFPI)	12
Danish Albums (Hitlisten)	4
Dutch Albums (Album Top 100)	7
Finnish Albums (Suomen virallinen lista)	4
French Albums (SNEP)	15
German Albums (Offizielle Top 100)	16
Greek Albums (IFPI)	7
Hungarian Albums (MAHASZ)	6
Irish Albums (IRMA)	1
Italian Albums (FIMI)	1
Japanese Albums (Oricon)	6
Mexican Albums (Top 100 Mexico)	1
New Zealand Albums (RMNZ)	1
Norwegian Albums (VG-lista)	9
Polish Albums (OLiS)	6
Portuguese Albums (AFP)	3
Scottish Albums (Official Charts)	2
Spanish Albums (Promusicae)	4
Swedish Albums (Sverigetopplistan)	1
Swiss Albums (Schweizer Hitparade)	18
UK Albums (Official Charts)	2
Uruguayan Albums (CUD)	19
US Billboard 200	1

=== Year-end charts ===
2011 year-end chart performance for Up All Night
Chart (2011)	Position
Australian Albums (ARIA)	47
Irish Albums (IRMA)	10
New Zealand Albums (RMNZ)	17
Swedish Albums (Sverigetopplistan)	44
UK Albums (OCC)	16

2012 year-end chart performance for Up All Night
Chart (2012)	Position
Australian Albums (ARIA)	2
Belgian Albums (Ultratop Flanders)	17
Belgian Albums (Ultratop Wallonia)	68
Canadian Albums (Billboard)	3
Dutch Albums (Album Top 100)	37
Finnish Albums (Suomen virallinen lista)	51
French Albums (SNEP)	46
Hungarian Albums (MAHASZ)	34
Irish Albums (IRMA)	8
Italian Albums (FIMI)	12
Mexican Albums (AMPROFON)	1
New Zealand Albums (RMNZ)	3
Spanish Albums (PROMUSICAE)	22
Swedish Albums (Sverigetopplistan)	29
Swiss Albums (Schweizer Hitparade)	55
UK Albums (OCC)	15
US Billboard 200	5
Worldwide	3

2013 year-end chart performance for Up All Night
Chart (2013)	Position
Australian Albums (ARIA)	50
French Albums (SNEP)	136
Irish Albums (IRMA)	13
Italian Albums (FIMI)	59
Japanese Albums (Oricon)	52
Mexican Albums (AMPROFON)	12
Spanish Albums (PROMUSICAE)	26
UK Albums (OCC)	42
US Billboard 200	43

2014 year-end chart performance for Up All Night
Chart (2014)	Position
Italian Albums (FIMI)	80

=== Decade-end charts ===
Decade-end chart performance for Up All Night
Chart (2010–2019)	Position
Australian Albums (ARIA)	15
UK Albums (OCC)	35
US Billboard 200	37

== Certifications and sales ==
Certifications and sales for Up All Night
Region	Certification	Certified units/sales
Argentina	Platinum	
Australia (ARIA)	5× Platinum	350,000^{^}
Austria (IFPI Austria)	Gold	10,000^{*}
Canada (Music Canada)	6× Platinum	480,000^{‡}
Colombia	2× Platinum	
Chile	Platinum	10,000
Denmark (IFPI Danmark)	3× Platinum	60,000^{‡}
Finland (Musiikkituottajat)	Gold	10,811
France (SNEP)	Gold	50,000^{*}
Germany (BVMI)	Gold	100,000^{‡}
Greece (IFPI Greece)	Gold	3,000^{^}
Ireland (IRMA)	2× Platinum	30,000^{^}
Italy (FIMI)	2× Platinum	120,000^{*}
Japan (RIAJ)	Platinum	250,000^{^}
Mexico (AMPROFON)	Diamond+Gold	330,000^{‡}
New Zealand (RMNZ)	5× Platinum	75,000^{‡}
Peru	Gold	
Philippines (PARI)	4× Platinum	60,000^{*}
Poland (ZPAV)	3× Platinum	60,000^{‡}
Portugal (AFP)	Gold	7,500^{^}
Spain (Promusicae)	Gold	20,000^{^}
Sweden (GLF)	Platinum	40,000^{‡}
United Kingdom (BPI)	4× Platinum	1,086,434
United States (RIAA)	3× Platinum	2,095,000
Venezuela	4× Platinum	
Summaries
Europe (IFPI)	Platinum	1,000,000^{*}
^{*} Sales figures based on certification alone.^{^} Shipments figures based on certification alone.^{‡} Sales+streaming figures based on certification alone.

== Release history ==
Release history and formats for Up All Night
Country	Date	Format	Label
Ireland	18 November 2011	CD; digital download	Syco Music; Sony Music
Netherlands	18 November 2011	CD; digital download	Syco Music; Sony Music
Sweden	18 November 2011	CD; digital download	Syco Music; Sony Music
Belgium	21 November 2011	CD; digital download	Syco Music; Sony Music
Norway	21 November 2011	CD; digital download	Syco Music; Sony Music
United Kingdom	21 November 2011	CD; digital download	Syco Music; Sony Music
Australia	25 November 2011	CD; digital download	Syco Music; Sony Music
New Zealand	28 November 2011	CD; digital download	Syco Music; Sony Music
Denmark	6 February 2012	CD; digital download	Syco Music; Sony Music
Hungary	6 February 2012	CD; digital download	Syco Music; Sony Music
Poland	6 February 2012	CD; digital download	Syco Music; Sony Music
Portugal	6 February 2012	CD; digital download	Syco Music; Sony Music
Italy	7 February 2012	CD; digital download	Syco Music; Sony Music
South Korea	7 February 2012	CD; digital download	Syco Music; Sony Music
Taiwan	17 February 2012	CD; digital download	Sony Music Taiwan
United States	13 March 2012	CD; digital download	Columbia Records
Canada	13 March 2012	CD; digital download	Columbia Records
Mexico	13 March 2012	CD; digital download	Sony Music Mexico
Germany	25 May 2012	CD; digital download	Syco Music; Sony Music
Japan	8 August 2012	CD; digital download	Sony Music Entertainment Japan

== See also ==
- One Direction
- One Direction discography
- Up All Night Tour
