= More than This (One Direction song) =

Single by One Direction

from the album Up All Night
- Released: 25 May 2012
- Recorded: 2011
- Genre: Pop
- Length: 3:48
- Label: Syco
- Songwriter: Jamie Scott
- Producers: Brian Rawling; Paul Meehan

One Direction singles chronology
"One Thing" (2012)	"More than This" (2012)	"Live While We're Young" (2012)

Music video
- "More than This" on YouTube

"More than This" is a song by English-Irish boy band One Direction from their debut studio album, Up All Night (2011). It was produced by Brian Rawling and Paul Meehan, and was composed by Jamie Scott. Primarily backed by synthesizers, the track is an acoustic pop ballad about an unrequited love. "More than This", the album's fourth and final single, was released digitally by Syco Music on 25 May 2012.

"More than This" obtained generally favourable reviews from critics, who commended the balladry, but only charted on Australian and Irish charts. An accompanying music video, directed by Andy Saunders, depicts the group performing the track live as part of their Up All Night Tour (2011–12). One Direction performed the ballad during two of their major concert tours: Up All Night Tour (2011–12) and Take Me Home Tour (2013).

== Development and composition ==
After being formed and finishing third in the seventh series of The X Factor in 2010, One Direction were signed to Syco Music. Recording for their debut studio album, Up All Night, began in January 2011. In February 2011, the boy band and other contestants from the series participated in the X Factor Live Tour. After the tour concluded in April 2011, the group continued working on Up All Night. "More than This", confirmed to be released as Up All Night's fourth single by Sony Music Australia in early May 2012, was released via digital download on 25 May 2012. The digital download contains the principal recording, and live versions of the number itself, "What Makes You Beautiful", "Gotta Be You", and "Up All Night".

Produced by Brian Rawling and Paul Meehan, and written by Jamie Scott, "More than This" is an acoustic pop ballad that runs for 3:48 (3 minutes, 48 seconds). The chorus of the song is predominantly backed by synthesizers. One Direction's vocal range in the span from the note of F_{3} to A_{4}. Written in the key of C major, the track is set in common time at a moderate tempo of 70 beats per minute. Instrumentation includes guitar, strings, piano lines, vocals and synthesizers. The lyrical content regards an unrequited love. It features an acoustic guitar riff similar to that of Jonas Brothers' song Make It Right from the album Manish.

== Reception ==
Robert Copsey of Digital Spy was surprised by the group's "ability to carry off a sizeable ballad," regarding it as one of the best boy band ballads in recent years. Cosmopolitan's Sophie Goddard deemed the song a laudable addition to the balladry pantheon. Billboard correspondent Jason Lipshutz classified it as "One Direction's own "All I Have To Give," and opined that its synthesizers add a dignified demeanour to the refrain. In contrast, PopMatters writer Zachary Houle criticised the song as jarring, and dismissed it as "a bit cloying," which he attributed to band's "'90s ancestors."

The track was One Direction's fifth best-selling song in the UK by August 2012. Despite charting at number 49 on the Australian Singles Chart dated 20 May 2012, the single received a gold certification from the Australian Recording Industry Association (ARIA) for shipments of 35,000 copies. The single reached number 39 on Irish Singles Chart, marking One Direction's fourth top forty appearance in Ireland. The ballad also received a platinum certification from the IFPI Norway association, indicating sales of 10,000 units.

== Promotion ==
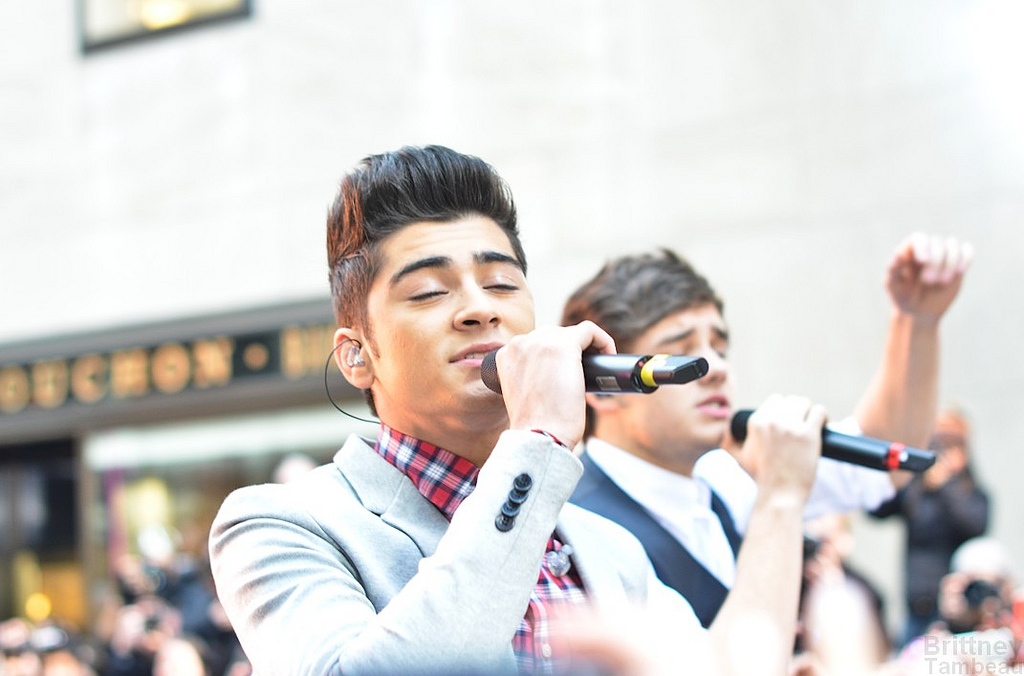
Zayn Malik and Liam Payne performing "More than This" at the Rockefeller Center

The accompanying music video was directed by Andy Saunders at the Bournemouth International Centre in January 2012, as part of One Direction's Up All Night Tour (2011–12). On 9 May 2012, Sony Music Australia disclosed via social networking website Twitter that a video for the track would premiere on 11 May. A 30-second preview of the clip, which showed the group gather around a couch onstage and sing the piece, premiered on Entertainment Tonight on 9 May. On 11 May, the clip debuted, a live performance of the song featured on their debut video album, Up All Night: The Live Tour, which was released on 28 May. Writing for MTV News, Jocelyn Vena suggested that fans would appreciate the clip's sequences.

On 12 March 2012, One Direction performed "More than This", "One Thing" and "What Makes You Beautiful" at the Rockefeller Center on The Today Show. An estimated 15,000 fans descended on the plaza. The group also performed the song during two of their major concert tours: Up All Night Tour and Take Me Home Tour (2013). Jane Stevenson of Canoe.ca listed the performance of "More than This" at Toronto's Molson Canadian Amphitheatre among the show's highlights.

== Charts ==
Chart (2012)	Peak position
Australia (ARIA)	49
Ireland (IRMA)	39
Honduras (Honduras Top 50)	18
Scotland (OCC)	63
South Korea International Songs (GAON)	58
UK Singles (OCC)	86

== Certifications ==
Region	Certification	Certified units/sales
Australia (ARIA)	Platinum	70,000^{‡}
Mexico (AMPROFON)	Gold	30,000^{‡}
New Zealand (RMNZ)	Gold	7,500^{*}
Norway (IFPI Norway)	Platinum	10,000^{*}
United Kingdom (BPI)	Silver	200,000^{‡}
^{*} Sales figures based on certification alone.^{‡} Sales+streaming figures based on certification alone.
