= Love You Goodbye =

Promotional single by One Direction

from the album Made in the A.M.
- Released: 10 November 2015
- Length: 3:16
- Label: Columbia; Syco
- Songwriters: Louis Tomlinson; Julian Bunetta; Jacob Kasher
- Producers: Liam Payne; Bunetta

"Love You Goodbye" is a song by English-Irish boy band One Direction. The song was released on 10 November 2015, as the third promotional single from their fifth studio album, Made in the A.M..

== Background and release ==
"Love You Goodbye" was leaked onto the internet on 3 November 2015, before it was officially released on 10 November. Tomlinson described the track as a subtly romantic power ballad and was the song he was most proud of writing.

Following the sudden death of Liam Payne on 16 October 2024, American singer Charlie Puth covered the song as a tribute to Payne at an event at iHeartRadio HQ in New York City on 23 October.

== Composition and lyrics ==
"Love You Goodbye" was written by Louis Tomlinson, Julian Bunetta, and Jacob Kasher, while production was handled by Liam Payne and Bunetta. According to the sheet music published at Musicnotes.com, by Alfred Music Publishing, the track runs at 66 BPM and is in the key of D-flat major. Tomlinson stated that the track was the most personal to him.

"It was one of those moments when the song was starting to come together, you felt a real excitement for it. Just the idea of the song is interesting to me. Everybody has that song after a break-up where you do have to see your ex again, and it’s kind of about that."

The track has been described as a power ballad. Lyrically, the song explores the theme of a heartbreak and is about a relationship coming to an end. Tomlinson told Entertainment Weekly that "Love You Goodbye" is "when you come to the end of a relationship and you always find yourself seeing that person one last time. It's that moment."

== Critical reception ==
Brennan Carley of Spin stated, "the tune's a bit more on the saccharine end of things, with the gents harmonizing about a relationship running its course — their voice mesh together incredibly well." Noelle DeVoe of Seventeen magazine described the track as "a beautiful tribute to saying goodbye to the person you love one last time." Cleveland.com wrote that the track is "highlighted by bigger hooks and catchier melodies" and praised Tomlinson's "strong harmonies" on the song.

== Chart performance ==
"Love You Goodbye" debuted at number 78 on the UK Singles Chart. In the United States, the song peaked at number ten on the Bubbling Under Hot 100 chart. The song also peaked at number 75 on the Australian Singles Chart. The song reached the top 50 in Austria, Ireland and Italy. The song was certified gold in Mexico in October 2020.

== Personnel ==
- Julian Bunetta – producer, engineering, instrumentation, backing vocals
- Liam Payne – producer, instrumentation
- Theodore Geiger – producer, backing vocals
- Randy Merrill – assistant mastering engineer
- Ash Howes – mixing (The Dark Room, London, United Kingdom)
- Tom Coyne – mastering (Sterling Sound, Nashville, Tennessee)
- Ian Franzino – assistant engineer

== Charts ==
Chart performance for "Love You Goodbye"
Chart (2015)	Peak position
Australia (ARIA)	75
Austria (Ö3 Austria Top 40)	48
Canada Hot 100 (Billboard)	80
Hungary (Single Top 40)	16
Hungary (Stream Top 40)	28
Ireland (IRMA)	45
Italy (FIMI)	35
France (SNEP)	108
Spain (Promusicae)	51
Sweden (Sverigetopplistan)	71
UK Singles (Official Charts)	78
US Bubbling Under Hot 100 (Billboard)	10

== Certifications ==
Region	Certification	Certified units/sales
Mexico (AMPROFON)	Gold	30,000^{‡}
United Kingdom (BPI)	Silver	200,000^{‡}
^{‡} Sales+streaming figures based on certification alone.
