= Moments (One Direction song) =

Song by One Direction

from the album Up All Night
- Released: 18 November 2011
- Recorded: 2011
- Genre: Pop
- Length: 4:22
- Label: Syco
- Songwriters: Ed Sheeran; Si Hulbert
- Producer: Si Hulbert

"Moments" is a song by English-Irish boy band One Direction from their debut studio album, Up All Night (2011). It was written by Ed Sheeran, and Si Hulbert, the song's producer. In 2011, as One Direction member Harry Styles told Sheeran that the boy band did not have enough songs for their album, Sheeran offered "Moments" as a track that he "was never going to use". The song is a mid-tempo pop ballad about a love lost to distance, or a boy who commits suicide after the death of his lover. Its instrumentation includes a lightly strummed guitar and intermediate piano lines.

The ballad received generally positive reviews from music critics, who noted the song's memorability and complimented its composition. Upon the release of Up All Night, "Moments" charted in lower regions on the singles charts of Australia, Canada, and the United Kingdom due to strong digital download sales. It was also certified Gold in both Australia and Mexico. One Direction performed the song on all three of their major concert tours: Up All Night Tour (2011–12), Take Me Home Tour (2013) and Where We Are Tour (2014).

== Background ==
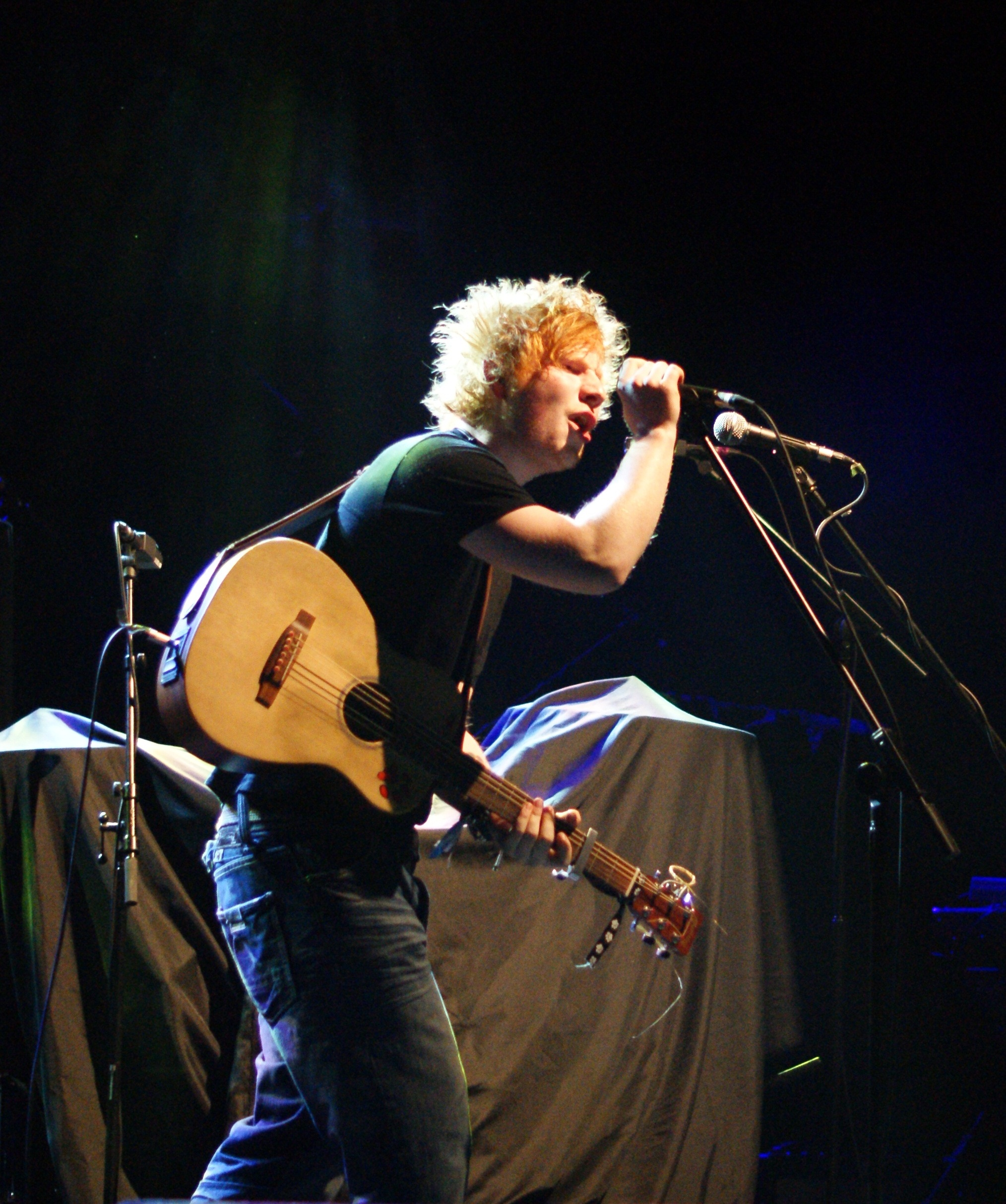
The song was co-written by Ed Sheeran (pictured).

After being formed and finishing third in the seventh series of The X Factor in 2010, One Direction were signed to Syco Music. Recording for their debut studio album, Up All Night, began in January 2011. In February 2011, the boy band and other contestants from the series participated in the X Factor Live Tour. After the tour concluded in April 2011, the group continued working on their debut album. "Moments" was written by Ed Sheeran and Si Hulbert and produced by Hulbert. In an April 2012 interview with news.com.au, Sheeran said that he wrote the track "years ago." In 2011, Sheeran met One Direction's Harry Styles at his "guitarist's friend's house". The group were putting their debut studio album together at the time. Sheeran had a CD with him of 40 songs that he was going to give to publishers. As the boy band did not have enough songs for their album, Sheeran told Styles, "Here's a CD. If you want one of these songs, have it." The song ended up on the deluxe edition of the album. Sheeran acknowledged that he was happy with the outcome, "It was a song I was never going to use. To have it on a multi-platinum selling album is quite nice." During the album's UK launch in late 2011, member Louis Tomlinson referred to the song as his favourite track on the album. Niall Horan also commented, "getting to write and record with Sheeran on our album was an honour."

== Composition and lyrics ==
"Moments" is a mid-tempo pop ballad. Written in the key of D major, the beat is set in common time and moves at a moderate 150 beats per minute. One Direction's vocal range in the song span from the note of D_{4} to A_{5}. "Moments" utilises a gently strummed guitar and intermediate piano lines. Inspired by the breakdown of a relationship between Sheeran and an unnamed woman, the song's lyrics revolve around an unrequited love. The chorus of the song is essentially built on the hook, "You know I'll be your life, your voice, your reason to be/ My love, my heart is breathing for this moment in time/I'll find the words to say/ Before you leave me today."

== Critical reception ==
"Moments" received generally positive reviews from music critics, many of whom praised its musical arrangement and memorability. Alex Hughes from The Huffington Post characterised the song as "heartbreaking". Hollywood Life and AllMusic both rated "Moments" as one of the best songs on Up All Night. Herald Sun writer Cameron Adams referred to the track as a "classic boy band ballad". Entertainment Weekly's Adam Markovitz cited the lyrics "be your life, your voice, your reason to be", writing that "Lyrics like that won't help the group earn much respect in music circles. But if a tween-pop empire is what these boys are after, they're definitely headed in the right direction". Erica Futterman for Rolling Stone opined that the track's lyricism is "quintessentially swoonworthy" toward an audience aged approximately 8 to 12 and female.

== Chart performance ==
Upon the release of Up All Night, "Moments" debuted on multiple world charts due to strong digital download sales. The song debuted on the UK Singles Chart at number 118 on the chart issue of 3 December 2011. "Moments" was One Direction's sixth best-selling song in the UK by August 2012. It bowed on the Canadian Hot 100 at number 87 on the chart issue of 21 March 2012. It also entered the Australian Singles Chart at number 60 on the chart issue date of 8 April 2012.

== Live performances ==
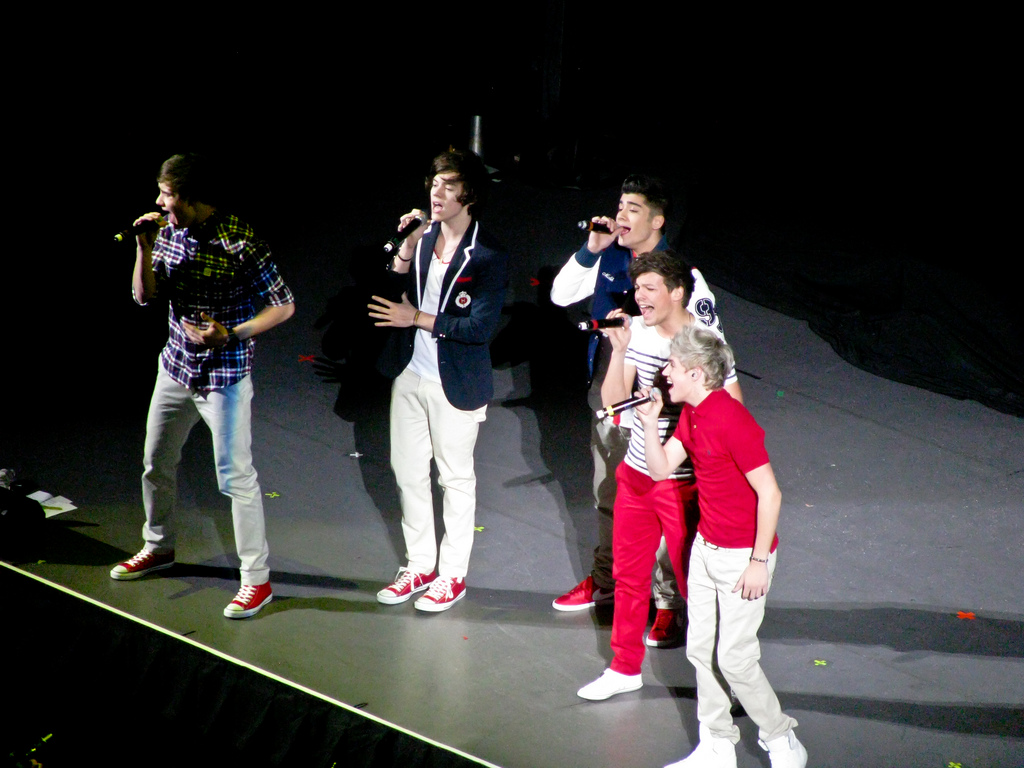
One Direction performing "Moments" in Toronto, February 2012.

One Direction performed the song on three of their major concert tours: Up All Night Tour (2011–12), Take Me Home Tour (2013) & Where We Are Tour (2014). Idolator editor Mike Wass felt the vocal ensemble performed a "rousing rendition" of the song at Sydney's Hordern Pavilion and noted, "Louis [Tomlinson] described it as his favourite song on Up All Night and he's not alone in that opinion if the swooning girls in the audience are any indication". Herald Sun writer Cameron Adams opined that the performance of "Moments" at Melbourne's Hisense Arena showcased the group's "strong pop voices". Erica Futterman for Rolling Stone assessed that the performance of the track at New York City's Beacon Theatre was the most tender moment of the show. Jane Stevenson of Canoe.ca listed the performance of the number at Toronto's Molson Canadian Amphitheatre among the show's highlights. The song was later included on the DVD release, Up All Night: The Live Tour.

== Charts ==
Chart (2011–12)	Peak position
Australia (ARIA)	60
Canadian Hot 100 (Billboard)	87
UK Singles Chart (OCC)	118

== Certifications ==
Region	Certification	Certified units/sales
Australia (ARIA)	Gold	35,000^{‡}
Mexico (AMPROFON)	Gold	30,000^{‡}
^{‡} Sales+streaming figures based on certification alone.
