= One Thing (One Direction song) =

Single by One Direction

from the album Up All Night
- B-side: "I Should Have Kissed You"
- Released: 6 January 2012
- Recorded: 2011
- Genre: Pop rock; power pop
- Length: 3:17
- Label: Syco; Columbia
- Songwriters: Rami Yacoub; Carl Falk; Savan Kotecha
- Producers: Rami Yacoub; Carl Falk

One Direction singles chronology
"Gotta Be You" (2011)	"One Thing" (2012)	"More Than This" (2012)

Music video
- "One Thing" on YouTube

"One Thing" is a song by English-Irish boy band One Direction from their debut studio album, Up All Night (2011). It was released in various countries by Syco Music on 6 January 2012, as their second single, and as their third single in the UK on 13 February 2012. Additionally, Columbia Records sent it to contemporary hit radio playlists on 22 May 2012 as their second single in the United States. Written by Savan Kotecha and its producers, Carl Falk and Rami Yacoub, initially, the upbeat pop rock number was written as two different songs. As both tracks had elusive attributes, the trio decided to merge the two into one song. The lyrical content regards the narrator's infatuation with a significant other.

"One Thing" garnered mostly positive reviews from music critics, who generally commended the track's catchiness. The single reached the top ten in Australia, Ireland and the United Kingdom, while attaining top-forty positions in Belgium (Flanders), Canada, New Zealand, and the United States. The number has been certified platinum by the Recording Industry Association of America (RIAA) for shipments of one million copies. Directed by Declan Whitebloom, the accompanying music video depicts One Direction performing in and around London. The group performed "One Thing" on televised programmes and four major concert tours: Up All Night Tour (2011–12), Take Me Home Tour (2013), Where We Are Tour (2014) and On the Road Again Tour (2015).

== Background and release ==
After being formed and finishing third in the seventh series of The X Factor in 2010, One Direction were signed to Syco Music. Recording for their debut studio album, Up All Night, began in January 2011. In February 2011, the boy band and other contestants from the series participated in the X Factor Live Tour. After the tour concluded in April 2011, the group continued working on their debut album. Carl Falk and Rami Yacoub produced three songs on the album: "What Makes You Beautiful," "One Thing" and "I Wish," all of which were co-written by Falk, Yacoub and Savan Kotecha. Initially, "One Thing" was written as two different songs: "One had a really, really good verse" and the other track "had a really, really good chorus", as noted by Falk in a 2012 interview with Examiner.com. Falk quipped that when they merged the two songs, "everything fell into place". Additionally, Falk deemed it the perfect accompaniment to "What Makes You Beautiful" and selected it as his favourite "out of the three tracks [that I have on the Up All Night album]".

It premiered on BBC Radio 1 on 21 November 2011. One Direction confirmed that "One Thing" would be released as the third single from their debut studio album, Up All Night, on 22 November 2011. Syco Music described the song as an "epic pop smash-in-waiting, featuring soaring vocal harmonies, powerhouse guitar riffs and an anthemic chorus that refuses to leave your head." The track was released digitally in various European countries on 6 January 2012. "I Should Have Kissed You", the B-side to "One Thing", was confirmed on 25 January 2012. CD singles, containing "One Thing" and "I Should Have Kissed You", were released on 13 February 2012 in the United Kingdom. In addition, "One Thing" was released as the second US single from Up All Night; Columbia Records sent it to contemporary hit radio (CHR) playlists on 22 May 2012.

== Composition ==
"One Thing" is an upbeat, uptempo pop rock number that runs for three minutes and ten seconds. Its instrumentation includes piano lines, vocals, and guitar strings. The lyrical content regards the protagonist's infatuation with a significant other, while the lead vocals are predominantly sung by members Harry Styles and Liam Payne. According to the digital sheet music published at Musicnotes.com by Sony/ATV Music Publishing, One Direction's vocal range in the span from the note of B_{3} to D_{5}. Written in the key of D major, the song set in the time signature of common time at a fast-paced tempo of 128 beats per minute. The track incorporates rock music influences and a simplistic guitar riff. The chorus of the song is predominantly featured alongside the bridge and is backed by wordless chants. The song has been noted as musically similar to the Backstreet Boys song "I Want It That Way" and to the group's debut single, "What Makes You Beautiful".

== Critical reception ==
Due to its resemblance to the aforementioned Backstreet Boys number, PopMatters's Zachary Houle suggested that there could occur "a pretty compelling case to launch a plagiarism lawsuit", concluding: "Homage or theft? You decide". Brian Mansfield from USA Today felt the song's Backstreet Boys-references "may or may not be intentional," but noted that the attribute "is the same." Lewis Corner from Digital Spy awarded the song four out five stars, complimented the song's guitar riff, its "forceful" chorus, and the melody as memorable, and summarised it as an "arena-ready hit". A Newsround reviewer gave the song four and half stars out five stars, praising the group's vocal performance and its sonic palette. Billboard correspondent Jason Lipshutz hailed "One Thing" as "perfectly executed pop rock" and opined that it "could own radio for months". Cosmopolitan's Sophie Goddard lauded "One Thing" as an "upbeat, catchy, hit-in-waiting," and Entertainment Weekly writer Adam Markovitz commended it as "irresistibly bouncy".

== Commercial performance ==
"One Thing" peaked at number six on the Irish Singles Chart in the week ending 16 February 2012, becoming the band's third top ten appearance in Ireland. The single bowed at number 28 on the UK Singles Chart dated 22 January 2012. Buoyed by weekly sales of 31,602 copies in the week of 19 February 2012, it peaked at number nine in the United Kingdom and marked the group's third consecutive top ten hit. "One Thing" was One Direction's second best-selling song in the UK by August 2012, denoting sales of 154,000 copies. Due to strong digital downloads from its parent album, "One Thing" debuted on the US Billboard Hot 100 at number 90 on 21 March 2012, and had sold 300,000 copies in the US by 21 May 2012. After being serviced to radio formats on 22 May 2012, "One Thing" peaked at number 39 for the week ending 20 June 2012. On 21 September 2012, "One Thing" was certified platinum by the Recording Industry Association of America (RIAA), and as of November 2013, the song had sold 1,486,000 copies in the US.

It peaked at number 17 on the Canadian Hot 100 and was certified platinum by Music Canada on 10 July 2012, denoting sales of 80,000 copies. The song debuted at number 34 on the New Zealand Singles Chart on 23 January 2012. After fifteen weeks of fluctuation around the top forty, "One Thing" rose from number 28 to 16, signifying its peak position. "One Thing" was certified gold by the Recording Industry Association of New Zealand (RIANZ) for sales of 7,500 units. The single bowed at number 32 on the Australian Singles Chart of 12 February 2012. "One Thing" peaked at number three in its tenth charting week, becoming One Direction's highest-peaking single in the country at the time and their second top ten hit. One Direction became the second act of 2012 to have two singles simultaneously occupying the chart's top ten when "One Thing" was at number six and "What Makes You Beautiful" at number ten for the chart week ending 22 April 2012. The single has been certified quadruple platinum by the Australian Recording Industry Association (ARIA), indicating shipments of 280,000 copies.

== Music video ==
The accompanying music video was directed by Declan Whitebloom in London on 28 November 2011. Whitebloom approached shooting the clip with a "what you get, is what you get" sentiment, which, as he noted, "can create some real magic." In regard to its concept, Whiteboom characterised the clip as "kind of Monkees or Beatles-esque", elaborating that it revolves around "five lads go[ing] crazy in London, it's like a big day out in London." In a December interview with Capital FM, member Harry Styles reflected that the shoot was a fun, careless romp. Premiering on YouTube on 13 January 2012, the music video depicts the band performing in and around London. As of June 2023, the music video has garnered more than 770 million YouTube views. One Direction surged 35-10 from the previous week on Billboard's Social 50 chart. Alex Hughes of The Huffington Post commented that the music video has an effortless element of happiness, proclaiming: "if you fail to crack a smile, there is a 100 percent chance that you are the devil."

== Live performances ==
One Direction performed "One Thing" live for the first time at Capital FM's Jingle Bell Ball on 4 December 2011, at The O_{2} Arena. The group performed "One Thing" and "What Makes You Beautiful" on Dancing on Ice on 5 February 2012. In the United States, One Direction performed the song along with "More than This" and "What Makes You Beautiful" for the first time on The Today Show at the Rockefeller Center on 12 March 2012. An estimated 15,000 fans descended on the plaza. On 7 April 2012, One Direction performed "What Makes You Beautiful" and "One Thing" and appeared in a comedy sketch with Sofia Vergara on comedy television show Saturday Night Live. The group played "What Makes You Beautiful" and "One Thing" and presented an award for "Most Popular New Female Talent" at the 54th Logie Awards on 15 April 2012. On 6 September 2012, One Direction performed "One Thing" at the 2012 MTV Video Music Awards. It was included on the set list of the group's headlining sold-out show at Madison Square Garden on 3 December 2012. Additionally, One Direction performed the song on four of their major concert tours: Up All Night Tour (2011–12) and Take Me Home Tour (2013). After Malik's departure in 2015, Payne took the first pre-chorus and did the high harmony along with Tomlinson doing the lead on the second pre-chorus.

== Track listing ==
- UK CD single
1. "One Thing" – 3:19
2. "I Should Have Kissed You" – 3:34
- Digital download
1. "One Thing" – 3:19
2. "I Should Have Kissed You" – 3:34
3. "One Thing" (acoustic) – 3:04
4. "One Thing" (acoustic; music video) – 3:08

== Charts ==
=== Weekly charts ===
Weekly chart performance for "One Thing"
Chart (2012)	Peak position
Australia (ARIA)	3
Belgium (Ultratop 50 Flanders)	37
Belgium (Ultratip Bubbling Under Wallonia)	45
Brazil (Billboard Brasil Hot 100)	4
Canada Hot 100 (Billboard)	17
France (SNEP)	91
Hungary (Rádiós Top 40)	4
Ireland (IRMA)	6
Netherlands (Single Top 100)	72
New Zealand (Recorded Music NZ)	16
Russia Airplay (Tophit)	152
Scottish Singles Sales (Official Charts)	8
Slovakia Airplay (ČNS IFPI)	26
South Korea International Chart (GAON)	163
UK Singles (Official Charts)	9
UK Airplay (Music Week)	27
Ukraine Airplay (Tophit)	141
US Billboard Hot 100	39
US Adult Pop Airplay (Billboard)	34
US Pop Airplay (Billboard)	15

=== Year-end charts ===
Year-end chart performance for "One Thing"
Chart (2012)	Position
Australia (ARIA)	22
Belgium (Ultratop Flanders)	97
Canada (Canadian Hot 100)	51
UK Singles (Official Charts Company)	121
US Pop Digital Song Sales (Billboard)	43

== Certifications ==
Region	Certification	Certified units/sales
Australia (ARIA)	5× Platinum	350,000^{‡}
Canada (Music Canada)	3× Platinum	240,000^{‡}
Italy (FIMI)	Gold	15,000^{*}
Japan (RIAJ)	Gold	100,000^{*}
Mexico (AMPROFON)	Platinum	60,000^{‡}
New Zealand (RMNZ)	2× Platinum	60,000^{‡}
Norway (IFPI Norway)	3× Platinum	30,000^{*}
Sweden (GLF)	Platinum	40,000^{‡}
United Kingdom (BPI)	Platinum	600,000^{‡}
United States (RIAA)	Platinum	1,637,000
Streaming
Denmark (IFPI Danmark)	Gold	450,000^{†}
Japan (RIAJ)	Gold	50,000,000^{†}
^{*} Sales figures based on certification alone.^{‡} Sales+streaming figures based on certification alone.^{†} Streaming-only figures based on certification alone.

== Release history ==
Region	Date	Format	Label
Austria	6 January 2012	Digital download	Syco Music
Denmark	6 January 2012	Digital download	Syco Music
Estonia	6 January 2012	Digital download	Syco Music
France	6 January 2012	Digital download	Syco Music
Germany	6 January 2012	Digital download	Syco Music
Greece	6 January 2012	Digital download	Syco Music
Hungary	6 January 2012	Digital download	Syco Music
Italy	6 January 2012	Digital download	Syco Music
Latvia	6 January 2012	Digital download	Syco Music
New Zealand	6 January 2012	Digital download	Syco Music
Poland	6 January 2012	Digital download	Syco Music
Portugal	6 January 2012	Digital download	Syco Music
Spain	6 January 2012	Digital download	Syco Music
Switzerland	6 January 2012	Digital download	Syco Music
United Kingdom	13 February 2012	CD single	Syco Music
United States	22 May 2012	Contemporary hit radio	Columbia Records
