= Gotta Be You (One Direction song) =

Single by One Direction

from the album Up All Night
- B-side: "Another World"
- Released: 11 November 2011
- Recorded: 2011
- Genre: Pop
- Length: 4:01
- Label: Syco
- Songwriters: August Rigo; Steve Mac
- Producer: Steve Mac

One Direction singles chronology
"What Makes You Beautiful" (2011)	"Gotta Be You" (2011)	"One Thing" (2012)

Music video
- "Gotta Be You" on YouTube

"Gotta Be You" is a song by English-Irish boy band One Direction from their debut studio album, Up All Night (2011). Written by August Rigo and the song's producer, Steve Mac, it was released in the United Kingdom by Syco Music in November 2011, as the album's second single. The track is a mid-tempo pop ballad incorporating an orchestral arrangement. The lyrical content is characterised by love sentiments.

The single debuted and peaked at number three in both the United Kingdom and Ireland, marking the group's second top ten appearance in both countries. Upon the United States release of Up All Night, "Gotta Be You" peaked at number 24 on the Bubbling Under Hot 100 Singles chart. Directed by John Urbano, the accompanying music video depicts the group spending time on the banks of Lake Placid, New York. One Direction performed the ballad on televised programmes and during their Up All Night Tour (2011–2012).

== Background and release ==
After being formed and finishing third in the seventh series of The X Factor in 2010, One Direction were signed to Syco Music. The number was written by August Rigo and Steve Mac, and was produced by Mac. One Direction premiered the single on BBC Radio 1 on 19 October 2011, with confirmation that it would serve as the second cut from Up All Night, following their debut single, "What Makes You Beautiful", which topped the UK Singles Chart in September of that year. Member Zayn Malik, in an October interview with Digital Spy, characterised "Gotta Be You" as "a bit more emotive" than their debut single. It was released by Syco Music via digital download in Ireland and United Kingdom on 11 November 2011 and 13 November, respectively. In both countries, the digital download contains the principal recording, its B-side, "Another World", and two remixes of the song itself.

== Composition and lyrics ==
"Gotta Be You" is a mid-tempo pop ballad. According to the digital sheet music published at Musicnotes.com by Sony/ATV Music Publishing, One Direction's vocal range in the song span from the note of E♭_{4} to E♭_{6}. Written in the key of A♭ major, the song is set in common time at a moderate tempo of 85 beats per minute. Set in an orchestral arrangement, its instrumentation includes a guitar, piano lines, and abundant strings. The chorus of the song opens with falsettos that are followed by vocal harmonies. The lyrical content is characterised by love notions and prominently revolves around its main declaration, "It's gotta be you, only you".

== Critical reception ==
Both USA Today writer Brian Mansfield, who appreciated the lyrical content, and PopMatters contributor Zachary Houle, who favoured the instrumentation, described "Gotta Be You" as one of Up All Night's highlights. Billboard reviewer Jason Lipshutz commended the vocal elements at play in its refrain and the track's "smooth" lyricism. Robert Copsey for Digital Spy opined that the single's memorable refrain is its strongest attribute and rated it four out of five stars. Matthew Horton of Virgin Media classified the song as one of the record's "superior tracks", and credited the ballad with keeping the album's "pecker up". Cosmopolitan's Sarah Kwong lauded the lyrics and instrumentation of "Gotta Be You" and noted its appeal to a more mature audience in comparison to their debut single "What Makes You Beautiful". Writing for Allmusic, Matthew Chisling, however, described the ballad as "a bit tepid."

== Commercial performance ==
"Gotta Be You" debuted and peaked at number three on the Irish Singles Chart on the chart dated 17 November 2011, marking the group's second top five appearance in Ireland. In the United Kingdom, the piece sold substantially less than their first single "What Makes You Beautiful", selling 59,461 copies in its first week. Despite the single reaching number one on the mid-week chart update, it entered the UK Singles Chart dated 20 November 2011 at number three behind the seventh week sales of Rihanna's "We Found Love" and the release of "Good Feeling" by Flo Rida. The song marks their second top ten hit and was One Direction's third best-selling track in the UK by August 2012. Upon the release of Up All Night in the United States, "Gotta Be You" did not enter the US Billboard Hot 100, but peaked at number 24 on the Bubbling Under Hot 100 Singles chart in the week of 28 April 2012.

== Music video ==
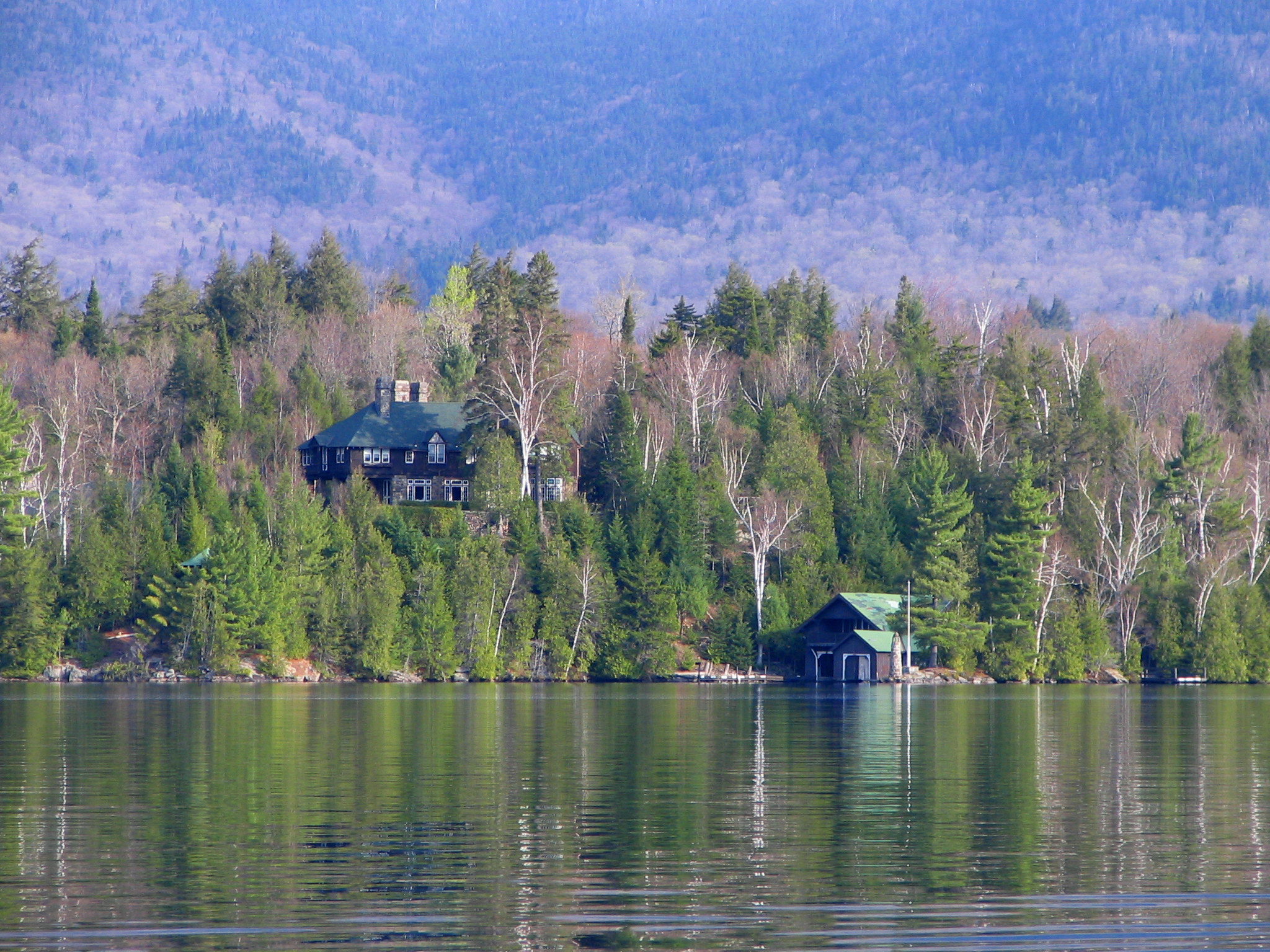
The single's accompanying music video was predominantly shot in Lake Placid, New York.

The single's accompanying music video was directed by John Urbano, who had previously directed the band's music video for "What Makes You Beautiful". While predominantly filmed in Lake Placid, New York, in October 2011, the clip's opening sequences were shot at the State University of New York at Plattsburgh. In October, the group told Digital Spy that they feared a crocodile attack when shooting the video. They also told Capital FM correspondent Kevin Hughes that the clip would be a significant transition from their previous music video; Malik described it as poignant and Louis Tomlinson reflected, "The first one was all about having a very fun song, but this song is a bit different."

The music video premiered on 8 November 2011 on YouTube, and predominantly depicts the group spending time on the banks of Lake Placid. As of February 2016, the music video has garnered more than 180 million Vevo views. In the music video, the five-some end up meeting with girls in a camping spot in a forest. As the music ends, the group watch fireworks as Malik walks towards his significant other and kisses her. The clip attracted positive commentary from fans of the group.

== Live performances ==
One Direction performed the single for the first time on The X Factor UK on 13 November 2011, to open the BBC's Children in Need 2011 telethon on 19 November 2011, and at Capital FM's Jingle Bell Ball on 4 December 2011, at the O_{2} Arena. One Direction also performed the track during their first headlining concert tour, Up All Night Tour. "Gotta Be You" was performed as the sixth song on the set list, in the second segment of the show's synopsis. They also performed this song at Madison Square Garden on 3 December 2012.

== Charts ==
=== Weekly charts ===
Weekly chart performance for "Gotta Be You"
Chart (2011–12)	Peak position
Canada Digital Songs (Billboard)	69
Euro Digital Song Sales (Billboard)	11
Europe (European Hit Radio)	31
Ireland (IRMA)	3
Scottish Singles Sales (Official Charts)	2
Taiwan (Hito Radio)	2
UK Singles (Official Charts)	3
UK Airplay (Music Week)	23
US Bubbling Under Hot 100 (Billboard)	24

=== Year-end charts ===
Year-end chart performance for "Gotta Be You"
Chart (2011)	Position
UK Singles (OCC)	169

== Certifications ==
Region	Certification	Certified units/sales
Australia (ARIA)	Gold	35,000^{‡}
Mexico (AMPROFON)	Gold	30,000^{‡}
United Kingdom (BPI)	Silver	200,000^{‡}
^{‡} Sales+streaming figures based on certification alone.

== Release history ==
Country	Release date	Format	Label
Ireland	11 November 2011	Digital download	Syco Music
United Kingdom	13 November 2011	Digital download	Syco Music
