= List of awards and nominations received by One Direction =

One Direction awards and nominations
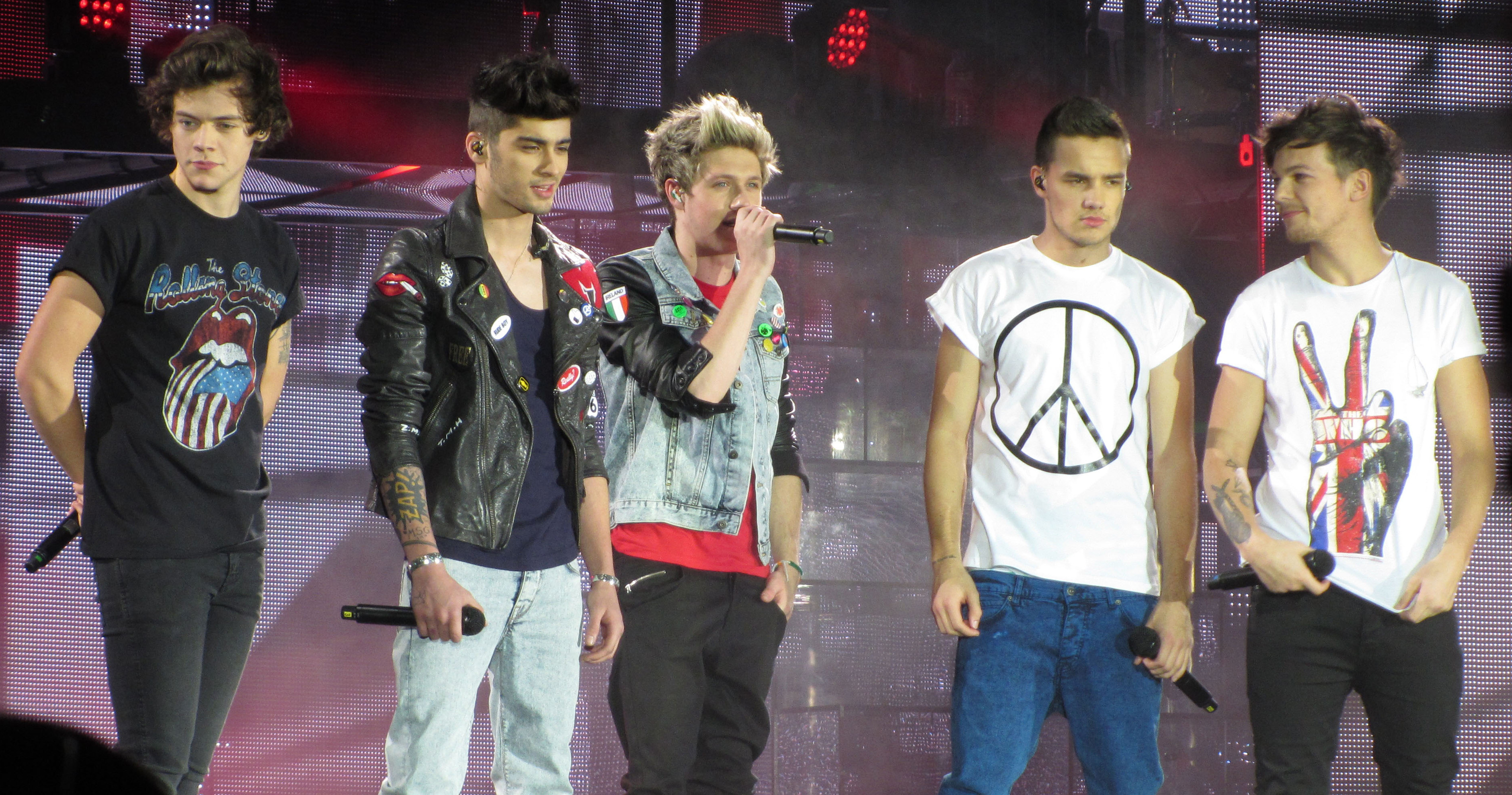
- One Direction in 2013; From left to right: Harry Styles, Zayn Malik, Niall Horan, Liam Payne and Louis Tomlinson
Awards and nominations
Award	Wins	Nominations
American Music Awards	7	10
Billboard	6	17
Brit	7	12
Juno	4	7
Kerrang!	2	7
MTV VMA	1	4
NME	3	7
Teen Choice	28	31
World Music	3	5
People's Choice Awards	1	2
ARIA Music Awards	5	5
Bambi Awards	1	1
Bravo Otto	5	5
Do Something Awards	0	1
Golden Trailer Awards	0	1
Global Recording Artist Awards	2	4
Japan Gold Disc Awards	1	5
40 Principales España	3	7
40 Principales América	3	5
MuchMusic Video Awards	2	5
Myx Music Awards	2	4
Neox Fan Awards	0	1
NewNowNext Awards	2	0
NRJ Music Awards	2	6
Popjustice £20 Music Prize	3	4
Radio Disney Music Awards	2	3
Rockbjornen	2	6
Telehit Awards	1	1
UK Music Video Awards	1	1
Young Hollywood Awards	2	3

Totals (Note: Certain award groups do not simply award one winner. They acknowledge several different recipients, have runners-up, and have third place. Since this is a specific recognition and is different from losing an award, runner-up mentions are considered wins in this award tally. For simplification and to avoid errors, each award in this list has been presumed to have had a prior nomination.)
- Wins: 177
- Nominations: 285

One Direction was an English-Irish boy band that consisted of members Niall Horan, Harry Styles, Louis Tomlinson, Liam Payne and Zayn Malik until his departure from the band in March 2015. One Direction have released five albums, Up All Night (2011), Take Me Home (2012), Midnight Memories (2013), Four (2014), and Made in the A.M. (2015). The band has won numerous awards, among them six Billboard Music Awards, seven Brit Awards, seven American Music Awards and 28 Teen Choice Awards.

== Music Video Honours ==
The Music Video Honours is an Annual music awards show by 4Music, a music and entertainment channel in the United Kingdom and available on some digital television providers in the Republic of Ireland. One Direction have received eight awards out of eight nominations.

Year	Nominated	Award	Result
2011	One Direction	Best Breakthrough	Won
2011	One Direction	Best Group	Won
2011	What Makes You Beautiful	Best Video	Won
2012	One Direction	Best Group	Won
2013	One Direction	Best Boys	Won
2013	Best Song Ever	Best Video	Won
2014	One Direction	Best Boy	Won
2014	Midnight Memories	Best Video	Won

== American Music Awards ==
The American Music Awards, (AMA) is an annual American music awards show, created by Dick Clark in 1973 for ABC when the network's contract to present the Grammy Awards expired. Unlike the Grammys, which are awarded on the basis of votes by members of the Recording Academy, the AMAs are determined by a poll of the public and music buyers. One Direction have won seven out of ten awards.

Year	Nominated	Award	Result
2012	Up All Night	Favorite Pop/Rock Album	Nominated
2012	One Direction	Favorite Pop/Rock Band/Duo/Group	Nominated
2012	One Direction	New Artist of the Year	Nominated
2013	Take Me Home	Favorite Pop/Rock Album	Won
2013	One Direction	Favorite Pop/Rock Band/Duo/Group	Won
2014	One Direction	Artist of the Year	Won
2014	One Direction	Favorite Pop/Rock Band/Duo/Group	Won
2014	Midnight Memories	Favorite Pop/Rock Album	Won
2015	One Direction	Artist of the Year	Won
2015	One Direction	Favorite Pop/Rock Band/Duo/Group	Won

== ARIA Music Awards ==
The Australian Recording Industry Association Music Awards (commonly known as ARIA Music Awards or ARIA Awards) is an annual series of awards nights celebrating the Australian music industry, put on by the Australian Recording Industry Association (ARIA). One Direction have received five awards of the nominations.

Year	Nominated	Award	Result
2012	Up All Night	Best International Artist	Won
2013	Take Me Home	Best International Artist	Won
2014	Midnight Memories	Best International Artist	Won
2015	Four	Best International Artist	Won
2016	Made In The A.M. & Four	Best International Artist	Won

== Bambi Awards ==
The Bambi, often simply called Bambi Awards and stylised as BAMBI, are presented annually by Hubert Burda Media to recognize excellence in international media and television "with vision and creativity who affected and inspired the German public that year," both domestic and foreign. One Direction have won one award.

Year	Nominated	Award	Result
2012	One Direction	Pop International	Won

== BBC Radio 1 Teen Awards ==
The BBC Radio 1 Teen Awards is an award show by the British radio station BBC Radio 1 to honor the top artists in music and acting of the year. One Direction have won seven awards out of nine nominations.

Year	Nominated	Award	Result
2012	Up All Night	Best British Album	Won
2012	One Direction	Best British Music Act	Won
2012	"One Thing"	Best British Single	Won
2013	One Direction	Best British Group	Won
2013	"Best Song Ever"	Best British Single	Won
2014	"Story of My Life"	Best British Single	Nominated
2014	One Direction	Best British Group	Nominated
2015	"Drag Me Down"	Best British Single	Won
2015	One Direction	Best British Group	Won

== Billboard Music Awards ==
The Billboard Music Awards is an honor given by Billboard, the preeminent publication covering the music business. The Billboard Music Awards show had been held annually in December until it went dormant in 2007, but it returned in May 2011. One Direction have won six awards out of seventeen nominations.

Year	Nominated	Award	Result
2013	Take Me Home	Billboard 200 Album	Nominated
2013	Up All Night	Billboard 200 Album	Nominated
2013	One Direction	Artist of the Year	Nominated
2013	One Direction	Top Billboard 200 Artist	Nominated
2013	One Direction	Top Social Artist	Nominated
2013	One Direction	Top Duo/Group	Won
2013	One Direction	New Artist of the Year	Won
2013	One Direction	Top Pop Artist	Won
2013	Take Me Home	Top Pop Album	Nominated
2013	Up All Night	Top Pop Album	Nominated
2014	One Direction	Top Duo/Group	Nominated
2015	One Direction	Top Artist	Nominated
2015	One Direction	Top Billboard 200 Artist	Nominated
2015	One Direction	Top Touring Artist	Won
2015	One Direction	Top Duo/Group	Won
2016	One Direction	Top Duo/Group	Won
2016	One Direction	Top Touring Artist	Nominated

== Billboard Touring Awards ==
Billboard honours the industry's top artists, venues and professionals of the year at the annual Billboard Touring Awards reception. These awards are based primarily on the Billboard Boxscore chart, recognizing true box office success and industry achievement. One Direction won five awards out of six nominations.

Year	Nominated	Award	Result
2013	One Direction	Concert Marketing & Promotion Award	Nominated
2013	One Direction	Breakthrough	Won
2014	One Direction	Top Draw	Won
2014	One Direction	Top Tour	Won
2015	One Direction	Top Draw	Won
2015	One Direction	Top Tour	Won

== Bravo Otto ==
The Bravo Otto is an award show by the German teen magazine Bravo to honor the top artists in music, acting and sports of the year. The award is presented in gold, silver and bronze and, since 1996, an honorary platinum statuette presented for lifetime achievement. One Direction have received five awards out of five nominations.

Year	Nominated	Award	Result
2012	One Direction	Super Pop Band - (gold otto)	Won
2012	One Direction	Internet Star - (bronze otto)	Won
2013	One Direction	Az év legjobb külföldi együttese (The year's best foreign band)	Won
2013	"Live While We're Young"	Az év legjobb külföldi dala (Best International Song of the Year)	Won
2014	One Direction	Az év együttese (The band of the year)	Won

== Brit Awards ==
The Brit Awards are the British Phonographic Industry's annual pop music awards. One Direction have received seven awards out of twelve nominations.

Year	Nominated	Award	Result
2012	"What Makes You Beautiful"	British Single of the Year	Won
2013	One Direction	British Group	Nominated
2013	One Direction	BRITs Global Success	Won
2014	"One Way or Another (Teenage Kicks)"	British Single of the Year	Nominated
2014	One Direction	British Group	Nominated
2014	"Best Song Ever"	British Video	Won
2014	One Direction	BRITs Global Success	Won
2015	One Direction	British Group	Nominated
2015	"You & I"	British Artist Video Of The Year	Won
2016	One Direction	British Group	Nominated
2016	"Drag Me Down"	British Artist Video Of The Year	Won
2017	"History"	British Artist Video Of The Year	Won

== Canadian Radio Music Awards ==
The Canadian Radio Music Awards are an annual series of awards presented by the Canadian Association of Broadcasters that are part of Canadian Music Week.

Year	Nominated	Award	Result
2013	One Direction	International Group Of The Year	Nominated

== Do Something Awards ==
The Do Something Awards culminated in 1996 to recognize young people under the age of 25 who have done outstanding work in their communities and the world. The awards include both young people involved in activism and individuals from the entertainment industry who have dedicated their time to activism and charity. One Direction have received one nomination.

Year	Nominated	Award	Result
2012	One Direction	Music Artist	Nominated

== FiFi Awards ==
The FiFi Awards are an annual event sponsored by The Fragrance Foundation which honor the fragrance industry's creative achievements and is the most prominent and prestigious celebratory event of the fragrance industry. One Direction have received two nominations.

Year	Nominated	Award	Result
2014	Our Moment	Fragrance of The Year: Women's Popular	Nominated
2014	Our Moment	Fragrance of The Year: Consumer's Choice- Celebrity	Won

== Golden Trailer Awards ==
The Golden Trailer Awards is an annual awards show that honors achievements in motion picture marketing, including film trailers, posters and television advertisements. One Direction have received one nomination.

Year	Nominated	Award	Result
2012	Up All Night – The Live Tour	Technical - Best Trailer: No Movie	Nominated

== International Dance Music Awards ==
The International Dance Music Awards are held annually as part of the Winter Music Conference. One Direction has received a nomination.

Year	Nominated	Award	Result
2013	One Direction	Best New Artist (group)	Nominated

== IFPI Global Recording Artist Award ==
IFPI published its first Global Recording Artist of the Year on 30 January 2014 to accurately capture the popularity of artists across streaming channels, alongside digital and physical album and singles sales the previous year. The independently verified chart included sales of albums - across digital, CD and vinyl formats; singles, both downloaded and physical; on-demand streams and music videos. The chart included all the music of each artist featured, not just one track or album. It used track and album equivalents to combine measurements of downloads, physical sales and streams. One Direction have collected their award after being named the IFPI Global Recording Artist of 2013. The award, which honours the most popular act globally across downloading, streaming and physical format sales, was presented by IFPI's chief executive Frances Moore.

Year	Nominated	Award	Result
2014	One Direction	Global Recording Artist of 2013	Won

== iHeartRadio Music Awards ==
The iHeartRadio Music Awards held their first ever ceremony on 1 May 2014. It is fan-voted.

Year	Nominated	Award	Result
2015	Directioners	Best Fan Army	Nominated
2016	One Direction	Best Duo/Group of the Year	Nominated
2016	Directioners	Best Fan Army	Nominated

== Japan Gold Disc Awards ==
The Japan Gold Disc Awards (日本ゴールドディスク大賞) for Music sales in the Recording Industry Association of Japan, is major music awards held annually in Japan also released as a CD. One Direction have received eight awards out of eight nominations.

Year	Won	Award	Result
2013	One Direction	New Artist of the Year (Western)	Won
2013	One Direction	One of the Best 3 New Artists (Western)	Won
2014	One Direction	Artist of the Year	Won
2014	Take Me Home	Album of the Year	Won
2014	Take Me Home	One of the Best 3 Albums in Western Music	Won
2015	One Direction	Artist of the Year (Western)	Won
2015	Four	Best 3 Albums (Western)	Won
2015	"Where We Are" Live from San Siro Stadium (Western)	Best Music Video	Won

== JIM Awards ==
The JIM Awards (also "Jimmies") are an annual awards show presented by the Flemish TV channel JIM. One Direction have received five awards out of seven nominations.

Year	Won	Award	Result
2012	One Direction	Best Newcomer - International	Won
2013	One Direction	Best Group	Won
2013	One Direction	Best Pop	Won
2014	One Direction	Best Band International	Won
2014	One Direction	Best Album International	Nominated
2015	One Direction	Best Band International	Won
2015	"Night Changes"	Best Video	Nominated

== Juno Awards ==
The Juno Awards are presented annually to Canadian musical artists and bands to acknowledge their artistic and technical achievements in all aspects of music. New members of the Canadian Music Hall of Fame are also inducted as part of the awards ceremonies. One Direction have received three nominations.

Year	Won	Award	Result
2013	Up All Night	International Album of the Year	Nominated
2014	Take Me Home	International Album of the Year	Nominated
2015	Midnight Memories	International Album of the Year	Nominated

== Kerrang! Awards ==
The Kerrang! Awards is an annual music awards show in the United Kingdom, founded by the music magazine, Kerrang!. One Direction have received a nomination.

Year	Nominated	Award	Result
2012	One Direction	Villain of the Year	Nominated

== Los Premios 40 Principales ==
Los Premios 40 Principales, is an award show by the Spanish musical radio station Los 40 Principales. Created in 2006 to celebrate the fortieth anniversary of the founding of the worldwide station. From 2012 the American national categories were declared extinct and Los Premios 40 Principales America were created in their place as a separate show from the one in Spain.

=== Los Premios 40 Principales España ===
For the Spanish version, One Direction have received four awards out of seven nominations.

Year	Nominated	Award	Result
2012	One Direction	Best International New Artist	Won
2013	Take Me Home	Best International Album	Won
2013	One Direction	Best International Act	Nominated
2014	Where We Are Tour	Best Festival, Tour or Concert in Spain	Nominated
2014	Midnight Memories	Best International Album	Nominated
2014	One Direction	Best International Act	Won
2014	Story of My Life	Best International Video	Won

=== Los Premios 40 Principales América ===
For the American version, One Direction have received two awards out of three nominations.

Year	Nominated	Award	Result
2012	One Direction	Best International Pop Act	Won
2012	One Direction	Best International New Act	Won
2014	One Direction	Best English Language Act	Nominated

== MTV Awards ==
=== MTV Europe Music Awards ===
The MTV Europe Music Awards (EMA) were established in 1994 by MTV Networks Europe to celebrate the most popular music videos in Europe. One Direction received twelve awards out of their sixteen nominations; three out of four in 2012, four out of six in 2013, and five out of six in 2014.

Year	Nominated	Award	Result
2012	One Direction	Best European Act	Nominated
2012	One Direction	Best New Artist	Won
2012	One Direction	Best UK & Ireland Act	Won
2012	Directioners	Biggest Fans	Won
2013	One Direction	Best Northern European Act	Won
2013	One Direction	Best Pop Artist	Won
2013	One Direction	Best UK & Ireland Act	Won
2013	One Direction	Best Worldwide Act	Nominated
2013	Directioners	Biggest Fans	Nominated
2014	One Direction	Best UK & Ireland Act	Won
2014	One Direction	Best North Europe Act	Won
2014	One Direction	Best Pop Artist	Won
2014	One Direction	Best Live	Won
2014	One Direction	Best Worldwide Act	Nominated
2014	Directioners	Biggest Fans	Won
2015	One Direction	Best Pop	Won
2015	One Direction	Best UK/Ireland Act	Nominated
2015	Directioners	Biggest Fans	Nominated

=== MTV Video Music Awards ===
The American MTV Video Music Awards (VMAs) is an award show by the cable network MTV to honor the top music videos of the year. It was first held at the end of the summer of 1984, and originally as an alternative to the Grammy Award in the video category. One Direction have won four awards out of four nominations.

Year	Nominated	Award	Result
2012	One Direction	Best New Artist	Won
2012	"What Makes You Beautiful"	Best Pop Video	Won
2012	"What Makes You Beautiful"	Most Share-Worthy Video	Won
2013	"Best Song Ever"	Best Song of the Summer	Won

=== MTV Video Music Awards Brazil ===
The MTV Video Music Brazil awards (originally Video Music Awards Brazil), more commonly known as VMB, are MTV Brasil's annual award ceremony, established in 1995. MTV viewers pick the winners for most categories since 2001. One Direction have received one award out of one nomination.

Year	Nominated	Award	Result
2012	One Direction	International Artist	Won

=== MTV Video Music Awards Japan ===
The MTV Video Music Awards Japan are the Japanese version of the MTV Video Music Awards. One Direction have received five nominations.

Year	Nominated	Award	Result
2013	Take Me Home	Album of the Year	Nominated
2013	"What Makes You Beautiful"	Best Group Video	Nominated
2013	One Direction	Best New Artist	Nominated
2014	"Story of My Life"	Best Group Video	Nominated
2014	"Story of My Life"	Best Karaokee! Song	Nominated

=== MTV Music Awards Italy ===
The MTV Music Awards Italy are an annual award ceremony hosted by MTV Italy. The ceremony awards the best video, performers, and artists of the year. One Direction have received five awards out of eight nominations.

Year	Nominated	Award	Result
2012	Directioners	Best Fans	Nominated
2013	Directioners	Best Fans	Won
2013	One Direction	Best Band	Won
2014	One Direction	Best Band	Won
2015	One Direction	Best Band	Nominated
2015	One Direction	Best Fan	Nominated
2016	One Direction	Best International Band	Won
2016	One Direction	Best Fan	Won

== MuchMusic Video Awards ==
The MuchMusic Video Awards is an annual awards ceremony presented by the Canadian music video channel MuchMusic. One Direction have won one award out of six nominations.

Year	Nominated	Award	Result
2012	"One Thing"	International Video of the Year - Group	Nominated
2012	"What Makes You Beautiful"	MuchMusic.com Most Streamed Video	Nominated
2012	One Direction	UR Fave: International Artist or Group	Nominated
2013	One Direction	UR Fave: International Artist or Group	Nominated
2013	"Kiss You"	International Video of the Year - Group	Nominated
2014	"Story of My Life"	International Video of the Year - Group	Nominated
2015	One Direction	Fan Fave International Artist or Group	Won
2016	"Drag Me Down"	iHeartRadio International Duo or Group	Nominated

== Myx Music Awards ==
The Myx Music Awards honor the biggest hitmakers in the Philippines. One Direction have received one award out of four nominations.

Year	Nominated	Award	Result
2012	"What Makes You Beautiful"	Favorite International Video	Nominated
2013	"One Thing"	Favorite International Video	Won
2014	"Best Song Ever"	Favorite International Video	Nominated
2015	"Steal My Girl"	Favorite International Video	Nominated
2017	"History"	Favorite International Video	Nominated

== Neox Fan Awards ==
The Neox Fan Awards were created by Atresmedia for teenage audiences to honor the best of the year in television, music, sports and films. One Direction has been nominated once

Year	Nominated	Award	Result
2013	"Kiss You"	Best Song of the Year	Nominated

== Nickelodeon Kids' Choice Awards ==
=== Nickelodeon Kids' Choice Awards USA ===
Year	Nominated	Award	Result
2013	One Direction	Favorite Music Group	Won
2013	"What Makes You Beautiful"	Favorite Song	Won
2014	"Story of My Life"	Favorite Song	Won
2014	One Direction	Favorite Music Group	Won
2015	One Direction	Favorite Music Group	Won
2016	One Direction	Favorite Music Group	Nominated

=== Nickelodeon Kids' Choice Awards Argentina ===
For the Kids' Choice Awards Argentina, One Direction have received one award out of two nominations.

Year	Nominated	Award	Result
2012	One Direction	Artist or Group International	Nominated
2012	"What Makes You Beautiful"	Favorite Song	Won

=== Nickelodeon Kids' Choice Awards Australia ===
For the Nickelodeon Australian Kids' Choice Awards, One Direction have received two awards out of three nominations.

Year	Nominated	Award	Result
2013	One Direction	Aussie's Fave Music Act	Won
2013	"One Thing"	Aussie's Fave Song	Won
2015	Directioners	Aussie/Kiwi's Favorite Fan Army	Nominated

=== Meus Prêmios Nick ===
For the Meus Prêmios Nick, One Direction have received two awards out of seven nominations.

Year	Nominated	Award	Result
2012	One Direction	Favorite International Artist	Won
2013	One Direction	Favorite International Artist	Nominated
2014	"Directioners"	Fanaticos Favoritos	Nominated
2014	One Direction	Favorite International Artist	Nominated
2015	One Direction	Favorite International Artist	Won
2016	One Direction	Favorite International Artist	Nominated
2018	Directioners	Fandom of the Year	Nominated

=== Nickelodeon Kids' Choice Awards Colombia ===
The Kids' Choice Awards Colombia is the Colombian edition of Nickelodeon's Kids Choice Awards, held in Bogota.

Year	Nominated	Award	Result
2014	One Direction	Favorite International Artist	Won
2015	One Direction	Artista O Grupo Internacional Favorito	Won

=== Nickelodeon Mexico Kids' Choice Awards ===
For the Nickelodeon Mexico Kids' Choice Awards, One Direction have won five awards out of seven nominations.

Year	Nominated	Award	Result
2012	"What Makes You Beautiful"	Canción Favorita	Won
2012	One Direction	Artista internacional favorito	Won
2013	"One Way or Another (Teenage Kicks)"	Canción Favorita	Won
2013	One Direction	Artista Internacional Favorito	Nominated
2014	"Directioners"	Club de fans favorito	Won
2014	One Direction	Artista o grupo internacional favorito	Nominated
2015	One Direction	Grupo Internacional Favorito	Won

=== Nickelodeon UK Kids' Choice Awards ===
For the Nickelodeon UK Kids' Choice Awards, One Direction have won four awards out of four nominations.

Year	Nominated	Award	Result
2012	One Direction	Favorite UK Band	Won
2012	One Direction	Favorite UK Newcomer	Won
2015	One Direction	UK Favourite Music Act	Won
2015	Directioners	UK Favourite Fan Family	Won

== NewNowNext Awards ==
The NewNowNext Awards is an American annual entertainment awards show, presented by the lesbian, gay, bisexual and transgender-themed channel Logo. One Direction has won an award.

Year	Nominated	Award	Result
2013	One Direction	Foreign Import of the Year	Won

== NME Awards ==
The NME Awards is an annual music awards show in the United Kingdom, founded by the music magazine NME (New Musical Express). One Direction have received two awards out of five nominations.

Year	Nominated	Award	Result
2012	Up All Night	Best Album	Nominated
2012	One Direction	Best Band	Won
2013	One Direction	Best Band	Won
2014	One Direction	Best Band	Nominated
2015	One Direction	Best Band	Nominated

== NRJ Music Awards ==
The NRJ Music Awards, created in 2000 by the radio station NRJ in partnership with the television network TF1, takes place every year in mid-January at Cannes (PACA, France) as the opening of MIDEM (Marché international de l'édition musicale). They give out awards to popular musicians by different categories. One Direction have received four awards out of four nominations.

Year	Nominated	Award	Result
2012	One Direction	International Duo/Group of the Year	Won
2013	"Best Song Ever"	Video of the Year	Won
2013	One Direction	International Duo/Group of the Year	Won
2014	One Direction	International Duo/Group of the Year	Won

== O Music Awards ==
The O Music Awards (commonly abbreviated as OMAs) is an awards show presented by Viacom to honor music, technology and the intersection between the two. One Direction have received a nomination.

Year	Nominated	Award	Result
2012	The Directioners	Fan Army FTW	Nominated

== People's Choice Awards ==
The People's Choice Awards is an American awards show recognizing the people and the work of popular culture. The show has been held annually since 1975 and is voted on by the general public. One Direction have received three awards out of eight nominations.

Year	Nominated	Award	Result
2013	Up All Night	Favorite Album	Won
2013	One Direction	Favorite Breakout Artist	Nominated
2013	Directioners	Favorite Music Fan Following	Nominated
2013	"What Makes You Beautiful"	Favorite Song	Won
2014	One Direction	Favorite Band	Won
2014	Directioners	Favorite Music Fan Following	Nominated
2014	"Best Song Ever"	Favorite Music Video	Nominated
2015	One Direction	Favorite Group	Nominated
2016	One Direction	Favorite Group	Nominated

== Pollstar Awards ==
The Pollstar Awards is an annual award ceremony to honor artists and professionals in the concert industry held by "Pollstar".

Year	Nominated	Award	Result
2013	One Direction	Best New Touring Artist	Nominated
2015	One Direction	Major Tour Of The Year	Nominated

== Popjustice's Twenty Quid Music Prize ==
The Popjustice £20 Music Prize, also known as the Popjustice Twenty Quid Prize, is an annual prize awarded by music website Popjustice to recognise the best British pop single of the previous year. The prize was conceived by Popjustice founder Peter Robinson in 2003 as a reaction to what he perceived as the pompous and elitist nature of the existing Mercury Prize, which recognises the best album of the previous year, and in particular its exclusion of pop music acts in favour of those from more esoteric genres. The shortlist for the Popjustice prize is announced in September of each year and the winner named the following month, to coincide with the presentation of the Mercury Prize. Popjustice gives a token prize of £20 to the winner of its award, in contrast to the £20,000 given to the winner of the Mercury Prize.

Year	Nominated	Award	Result
2014	"Story of My Life"	Best Track Of The Year	Nominated

== Premios Oye! ==
The Premios Oye! (Premio Nacional a la Música Grabada) are presented annually by the Academia Nacional de la Música en México for outstanding achievements in the Mexican record industry.

Year	Nominated	Award	Result
2013	One Direction	Álbum en Inglés	Nominated

== Pure Beauty Awards ==
Year	Nominated	Award	Result
2013	Our Moment	Best Female Fragrance	Won
2014	You and I	Best New Female Fragrance	Nominated
2014	You and I	Best New Design & Packaging Award	Won

== Radio Disney Music Awards ==
The Radio Disney Music Awards is an annual awards show which is operated and governed by Radio Disney, an American radio network. One Direction have won four out of thirteen awards.

Year	Nominated	Award	Result
2013	One Direction	Best Music Group	Won
2013	Directioners	Fiercest Fans	Won
2013	Live While We're Young	Song of the Year	Nominated
2014	One Direction	Best Music Group	Won
2014	Best Song Ever	Song of the Year	Nominated
2014	Directioners	Fiercest Fans	Nominated
2015	One Direction	Best Music Group	Nominated
2015	Steal My Girl	Best Crush Song	Nominated
2015	Directioners	Fiercest Fans	Nominated
2016	One Direction	Best Music Group	Nominated
2016	Perfect	Best Crush Song	Won
2016	Directioners	Fiercest Fans	Nominated
2016	One Direction	Radio Disney's Most Talked About Artist	Nominated
2017	One Direction	Best Music Group	Nominated

== Rockbjörnen ==
Rockbjörnen is a music prize in Sweden, divided into several categories, which is awarded annually by the newspaper Aftonbladet. The prize was first awarded in 1979, and is mostly centered on pop and rock.

Year	Nominated	Award	Result
2014	One Direction – "Friends Arena"	Concert of the year	Nominated
2014	"Story of My Life"	Foreign song of the year	Nominated
2014	"You & I"	Foreign song of the year	Nominated
2015	"Night Changes"	Årets utländska låt	Nominated
2015	One Direction Göteborg (Ullevi)	Årets konsert	Nominated
2015	Directioners	Årets fans	Nominated

== Shorty Awards ==
The Shorty Awards, also known as the Shorties, are an annual awards event that honors the best short-form content creators on the micro-blogging website Twitter and on other social media sites.

Year	Nominated	Award	Result
2011	One Direction	Music	Nominated
2012	One Direction	Band	Nominated
2013	One Direction	Band	Won
2014	One Direction	UK	Nominated
2014	One Direction	Band	Nominated
2015	One Direction	Band	Nominated

== Teen Choice Awards ==
The Teen Choice Awards were established in 1999 to honor the year's biggest achievements in music, movies, sports and television, being voted by young people aged between 13 and 19. One Direction have won 28 out of the 31 awards that for which they have been nominated. They currently hold the record for most Teen Choice Awards.

Year	Nominated	Award	Result
2012	One Direction	Choice Music: Breakout Group	Won
2012	"What Makes You Beautiful"	Choice Music: Love Song	Won
2012	One Direction	Choice Summer: Music Star - Group	Won
2013	One Direction	Choice Music: Group	Won
2013	"Little Things"	Choice Music: Love Song	Won
2013	"Live While We're Young"	Choice Music: Single - Group	Won
2013	"Take Me Home Tour"	Choice Summer: Tour	Won
2014	One Direction	Choice Music: Group	Won
2014	One Direction	Choice Other: Male Hottie	Won
2014	One Direction	Choice Web: Social Media King	Won
2014	One Direction	Choice Web: Twit	Won
2014	"Story of My Life"	Choice Music: Break-up Song	Won
2014	"You & I"	Choice Music: Love Song	Won
2014	"Where We Are Tour"	Choice Summer: Tour	Won
2014	Directioners	Choice Web: Fanatic Fans	Won
2014	"Story of My Life"	Choice Music: Single - Group	Won
2015	One Direction	Choice Music: Group - Male	Won
2015	One Direction	Choice Fashion: Male Hottie	Won
2015	One Direction	Choice International Artist	Nominated
2015	One Direction	Choice Summer Music Star: Group	Won
2015	One Direction	Choice Selfie Taker	Won
2015	"Steal My Girl"	Choice Music: Song - Group	Won
2015	"Night Changes"	Choice Love Song	Won
2015	"No Control"	Choice Party Song	Won
2015	On the Road Again Tour	Choice Summer Tour	Won
2015	"Directioners"	Choice Fandom	Nominated
2016	One Direction	Choice Music: Group	Won
2016	"Home"	Choice Music Single: Group	Won
2016	"Perfect"	Choice Music: Love Song	Won
2016	"Directioners"	Choice Fandom	Won
2018	"Directioners"	Choice Fandom	Nominated

== Telehit Awards ==
The Telehit Awards are an annual award show. One Direction have won nine awards out of nine nominations.

Year	Nominated	Award	Result
2012	One Direction	Most Popular Artist in Telehit	Won
2012	One Direction	Best International Pop Group	Won
2012	"What Makes You Beautiful"	Song of the Public	Won
2013	One Direction	Boyband of the Year	Won
2013	"Best Song Ever"	Most Popular Video on Telehit	Won
2014	One Direction	Boyband of the Year	Won
2015	One Direction	Most Popular Artist	Won
2015	One Direction	Boyband of the Year	Won
2015	"Drag Me Down"	Most Popular Video on Telehit	Won

== UK Music Video Awards ==
The UK Music Video Awards is an annual celebration of creativity, technical excellence and innovation in music video and moving image for music. One Direction have one nomination.

Year	Nominated	Award	Result
2012	"Live While We're Young"	People's Choice	Nominated

== United By Pop Awards ==
The United By Pop Awards is an annual fan-voted digital event which takes place on UnitedbyPop.com

Year	Nominated	Award	Result
2018	"Directioners"	Fandom of the Year	Won

== World Music Awards ==
The World Music Awards is an international awards show founded in 1989 that annually honors recording artists based on worldwide sales figures provided by the International Federation of the Phonographic Industry (IFPI). One Direction have received four awards out of five nominations.

Year	Nominated	Award	Result
2014	One Direction	World's Best Selling Group	Won
2014	One Direction	World's Best Selling British Artist	Won
2014	One Direction	World's Best Selling Recording Act	Won
2014	One Direction	World's Best Selling Pop Act	Won
2014	One Direction	World's Best Live Act	Nominated

== Young Hollywood Awards ==
The Young Hollywood Awards is an annual award event that took place since 1999, honoring promising and up-and-coming stars in Hollywood.

Year	Nominated	Award	Result
2014	One Direction	Hottest Music Artist	Nominated

== Youth Rock Awards ==
The annual Youth Rock Awards founded by JG Entertainment, that honors artists that are twenty-five years old or under and excel in dance, music or acting. One Direction won one award.

Year	Nominated	Award	Result
2011	One Direction	Rockin' Breakout Group of the Year	Won

== YouTube Music Awards ==
The YouTube Music Awards, abbreviated as the YTMA, was the inaugural music award show presented by YouTube.

Year	Nominated	Award	Result
2013	"Best Song Ever"	Video of the Year	Nominated
2013	One Direction	Artist of the Year	Nominated
2015	One Direction	50 Artists to Watch	Won
