= The X Factor (British TV series) series 12 =

British TV competition

The X Factor
- Series 12
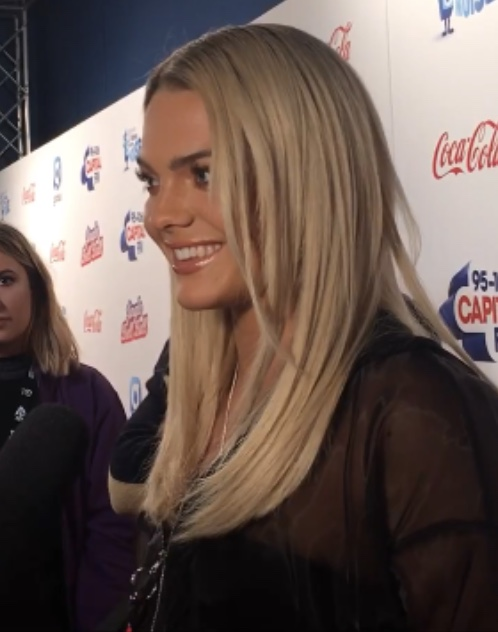
- Hosted by: Caroline Flack (ITV); Olly Murs (ITV); Rochelle Humes (ITV2); Melvin Odoom (ITV2)
- Judges: Simon Cowell; Cheryl Fernandez-Versini; Rita Ora; Nick Grimshaw
- Winner: Louisa Johnson
- Winning mentor: Rita Ora
- Runner-up: Reggie 'n' Bollie
- Finals venue: The SSE Arena, Wembley

Release
- Original network: ITV; ITV2 (The Xtra Factor)
- Original release: 29 August – 13 December 2015

Series chronology
- ← Previous; Series 11 Next → Series 13

The X Factor is a British television music competition to find new singing talent. The twelfth series began airing on ITV on 29 August 2015 and ended on 13 December 2015. The judges were Simon Cowell, Cheryl Fernandez-Versini, who returned for their respective ninth and fifth series as judges, series 9 guest judge and former The Voice UK coach Rita Ora, and BBC Radio 1 DJ Nick Grimshaw, with Grimshaw and Ora replacing Louis Walsh, the only judge who had been on the show from its inception in 2004, and Mel B. It was presented by Caroline Flack and Olly Murs, who had both previously co-presented spin-off show The Xtra Factor on ITV2 and replaced Dermot O'Leary, who left after eight series. Rochelle Humes and Melvin Odoom presented The Xtra Factor, replacing Sarah-Jane Crawford. Louisa Johnson was announced as the winner on 13 December 2015, making Ora the winning mentor.

== Judges, Presenters and Other Personnel ==
Judges and Presenter(s) for The X Factor Series 12

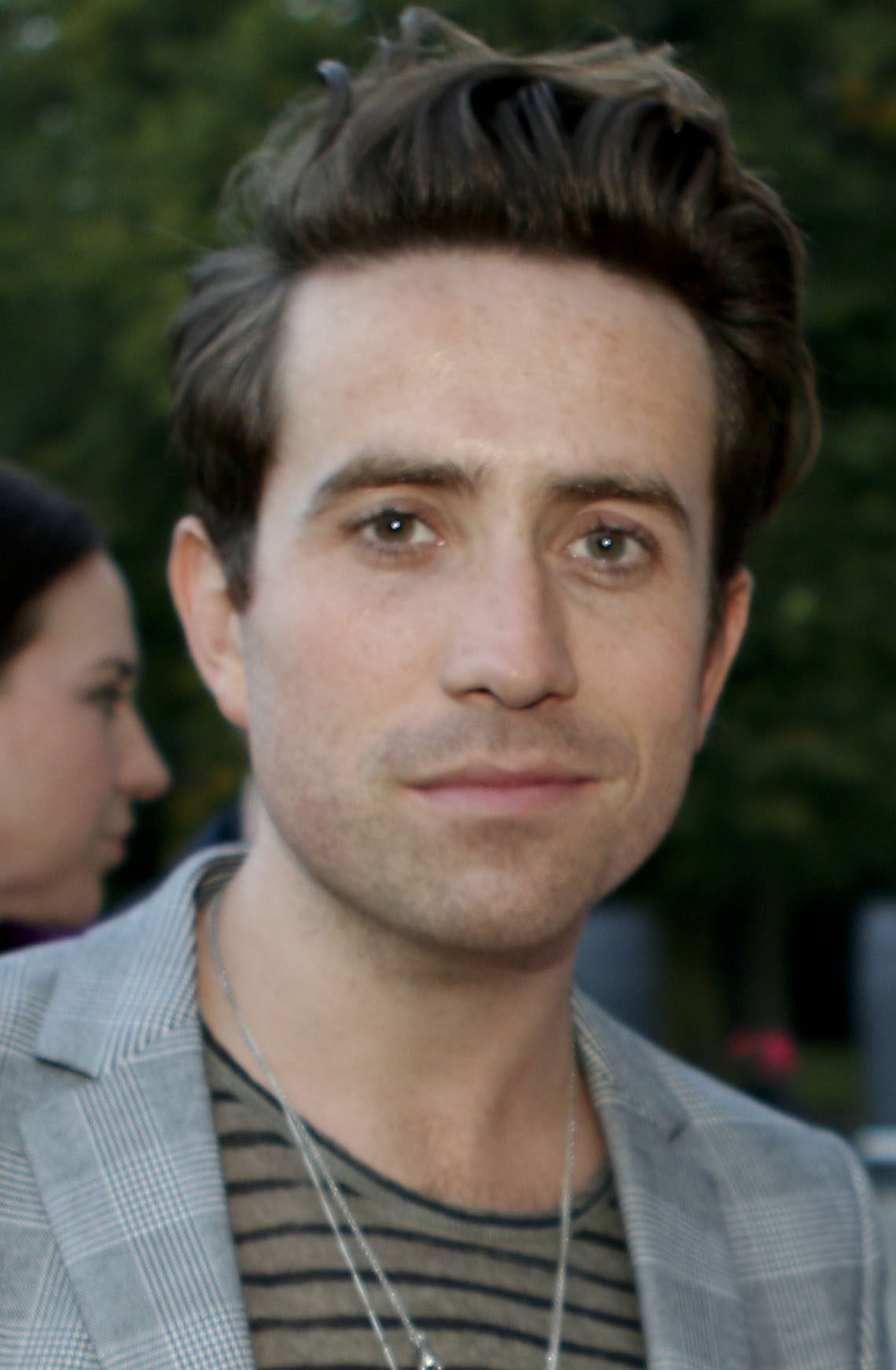
Nick Grimshaw

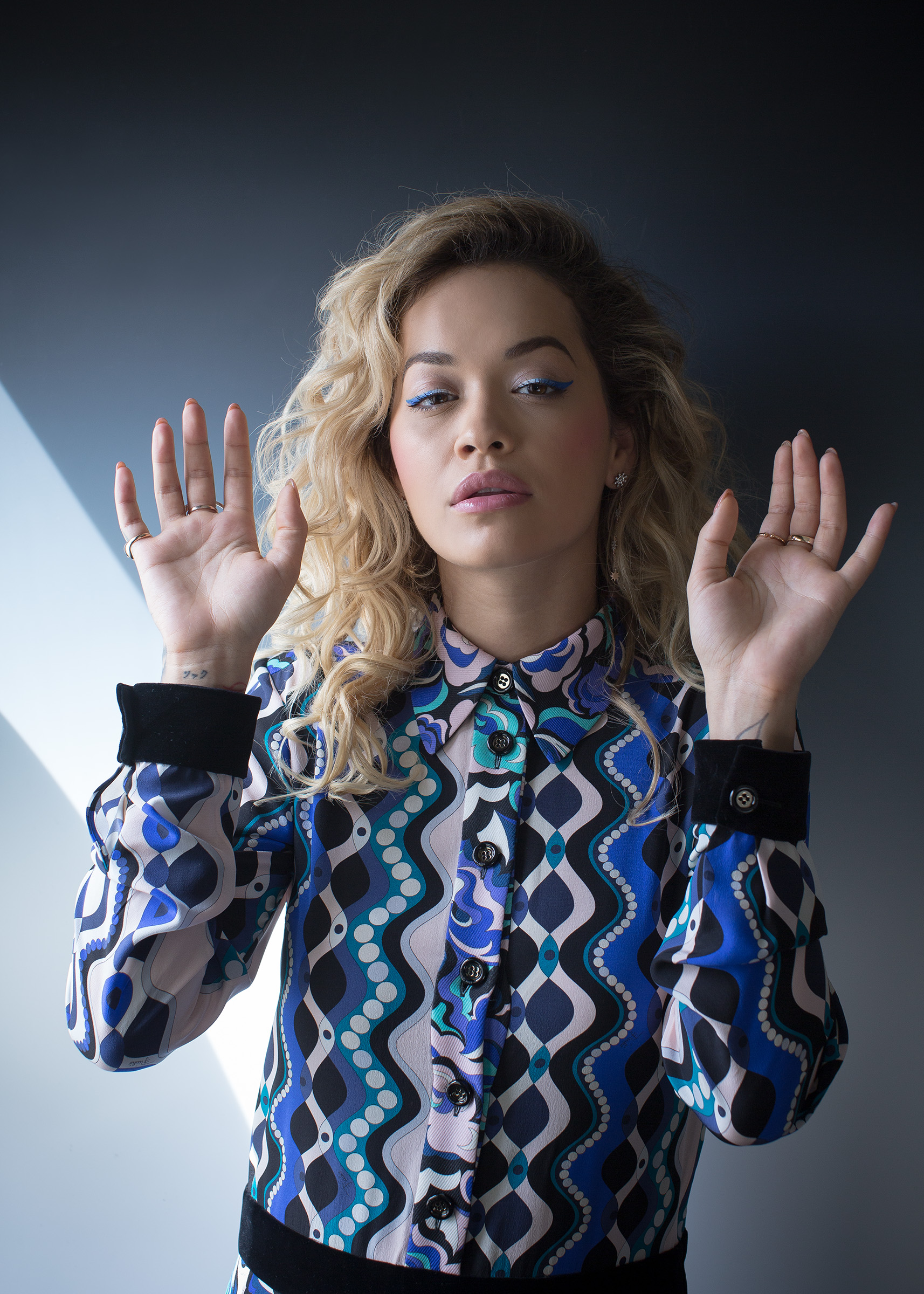
Rita Ora

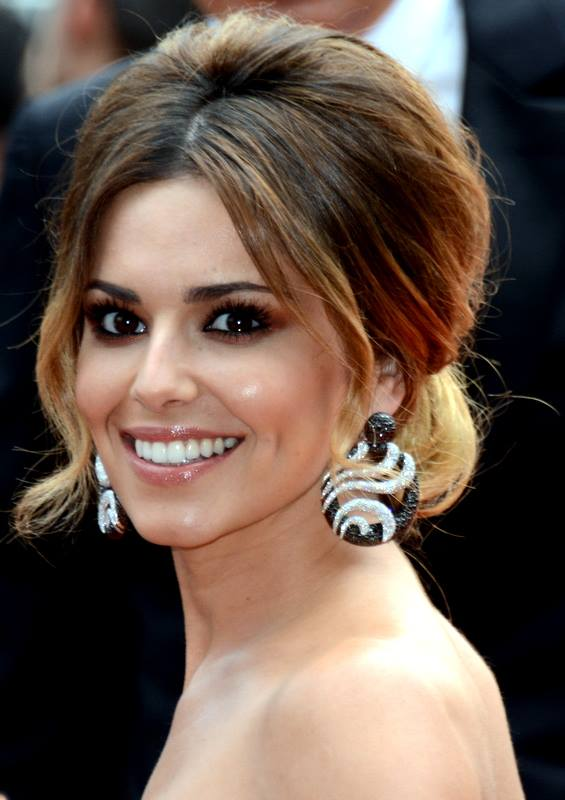
Cheryl Fernandez-Versini

Simon Cowell

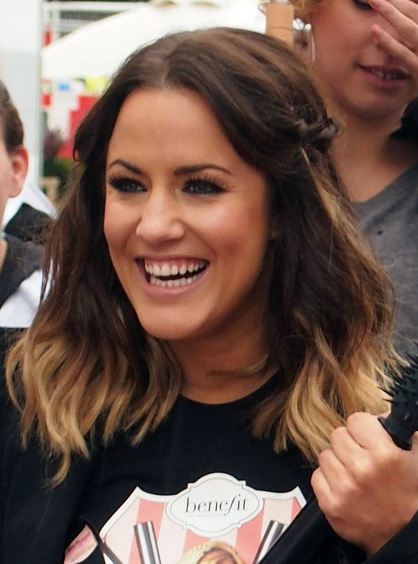
Caroline Flack (ITV1)

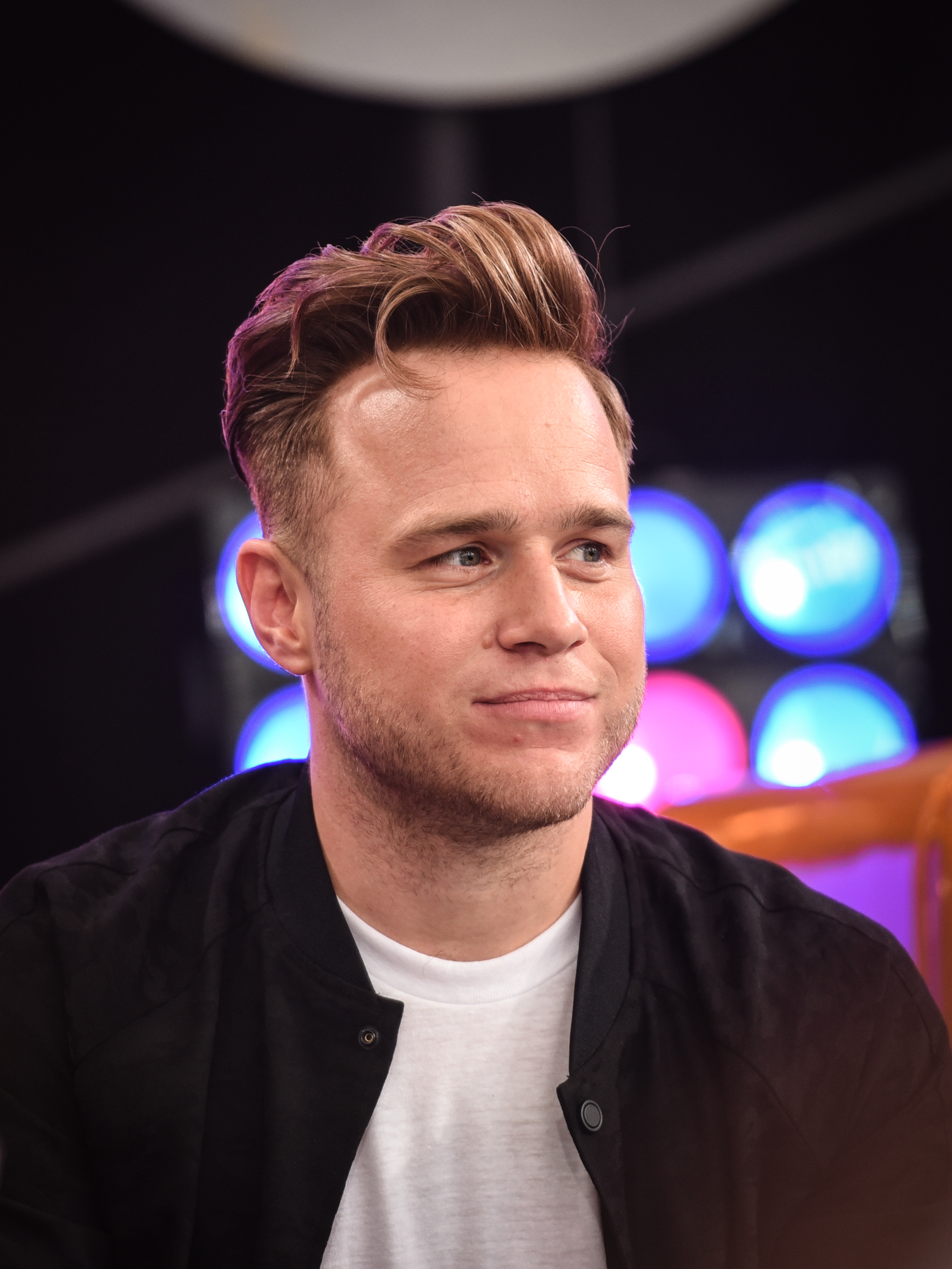
Olly Murs (ITV1)

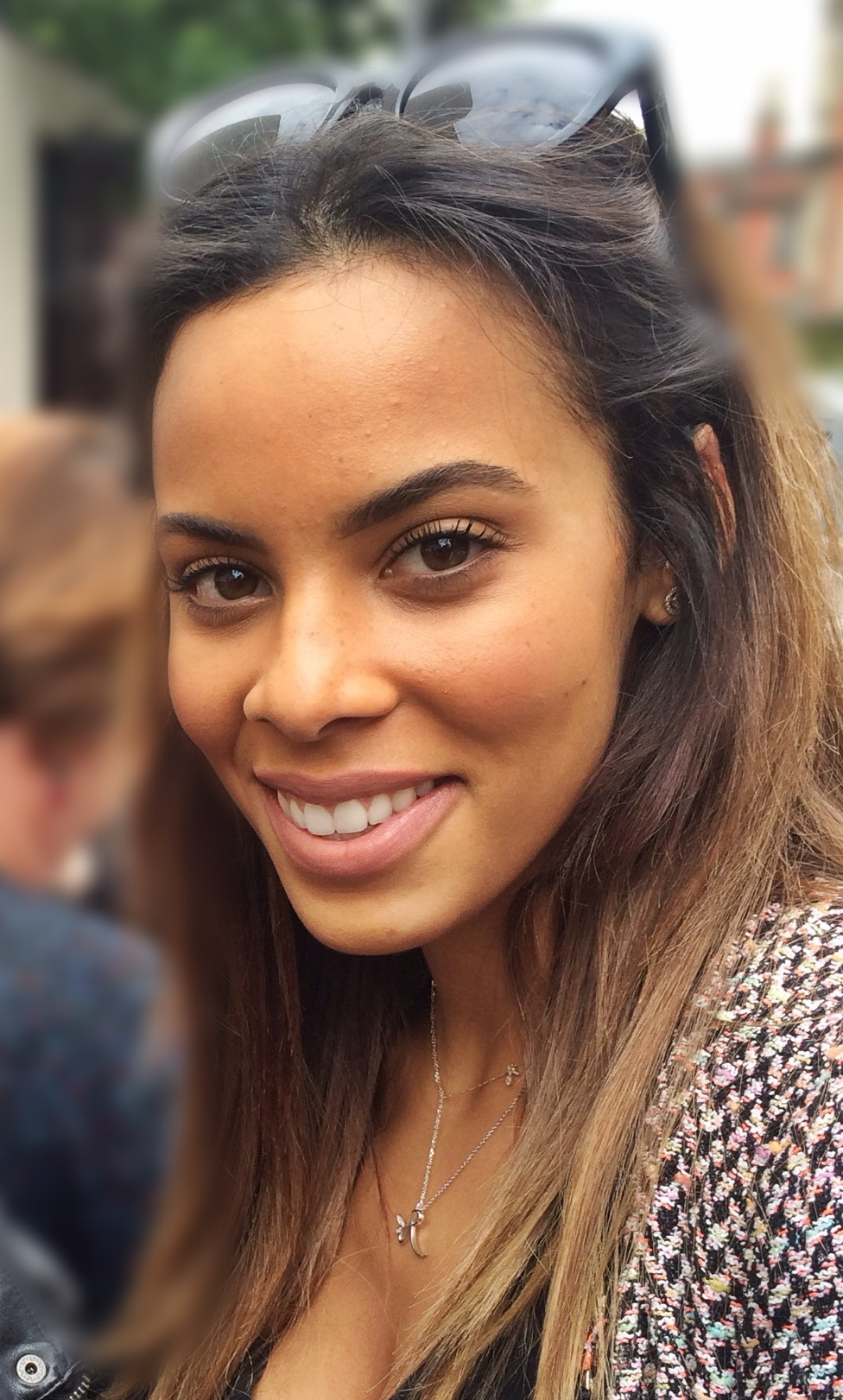
Rochelle Humes (ITV2)

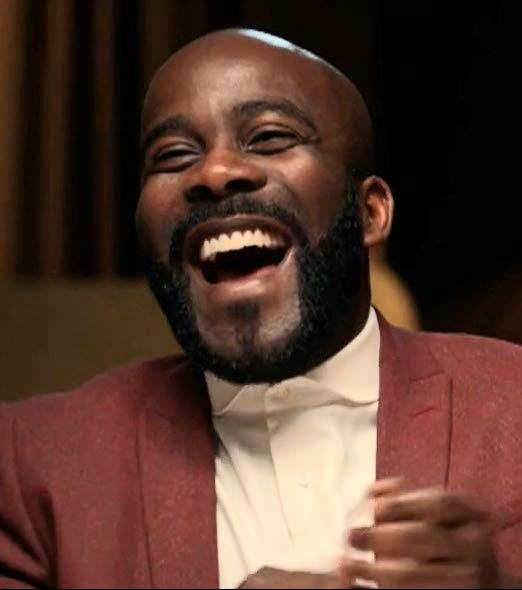
Melvin Odoom (ITV2)

In March 2015, Simon Cowell was confirmed to return as a judge for the twelfth series, his ninth on the show. In April 2015, Louis Walsh cited his desire to quit the show and return to management, and that it would take serious thought for him to return for series 12. He also revealed that he was in the dark about whom Cowell had the intentions of bringing onto the panel. On April 30, 2015, it was reported that Cowell was interested in having more "freshed faced" judges on the series, with Canadian singer Carly Rae Jepsen rumoured to be pursued by him. Jepsen responded to The Daily Star the same day saying: "If I got to live in London, then I’d be tempted to be a judge on one of your singing shows. I love the shopping and the people in London." On 14 May 2015, Walsh confirmed his exit from the show after 11 series on the judging panel, stating, "The truth is I've done it for 11 years; I never thought I would even be on TV for four or five. To get 10 was great, to get 11 was amazing – I'm not hanging around for them this year." He later continued, "But I wasn't sacked, I haven't been hired and I'm not hanging around." It was reported that former contestants Louis Tomlinson and Zayn Malik were being approached for full time judging roles, Tomlinson later served as a guest mentor with Cowell during the Judges Houses stage of the competition this season, and later served one season as a judge during series 15 in 2018.

On 16 June, Cheryl Fernandez-Versini was confirmed to be returning for her fifth series followed by new judges, series 9 guest judge and The Voice UK coach Rita Ora, and BBC Radio 1 DJ Nick Grimshaw, replacing Mel B and Walsh, who left the show after only one series.

On 27 March 2015, Dermot O'Leary announced that he was quitting the show, after eight series, to pursue other projects. On 16 April, ITV confirmed that former contestant Olly Murs and Caroline Flack would take over presenting the show, having worked together as hosts before on The Xtra Factor. They became the first duo to host the show.

On 18 June 2015, it was confirmed that The Saturdays singer Rochelle Humes and Kiss FM DJ Melvin Odoom would be the new hosts of The Xtra Factor.

The show's announcer Peter Dickson announced his departure from the show on 28 July 2015. Dickson was later replaced by Redd Pepper for this series, who was only present for Judges' Houses. However, on 30 October 2015, Dickson confirmed that he would return to The X Factor for the live shows.

== Selection process ==
=== Eligibility ===
The minimum age this year was increased back to 16, after being lowered to 14 in the previous series.

=== Auditions ===
==== Mobile auditions ====
In addition to the producers' auditions, the "Mobile Audition Tour" took place up and down the UK and Ireland throughout March and April. Auditions ran between 30 March and 23 May 2015, and visited Aberdeen, Skegness, Bradford, Huddersfield, Dundee, Sheffield, Peterborough, Northampton, Stirling, Cambridge, Middlesbrough, Nottingham, Scarborough, Norwich, Leicester, Ipswich, Coventry, York, Kingston upon Hull, Oxford, Chelmsford, Berkshire, Hertfordshire, Southend-on-Sea, Belfast, Bangor, Southampton, Isle of Man, Swansea, Blackpool, Bournemouth, Carlisle, Brighton, Truro, Isle of Wight, Wigan, Plymouth, Broadstairs, Margate, Stoke-on-Trent, Exeter, Essex and Yeovil.

==== Open auditions ====
Cities in the United Kingdom where the open auditions were held. Judges' auditions were held in London and Manchester.
Cities in Ireland where the open auditions were held.

Producers auditions commenced on 8 April in Dublin and ended on 7 June in London.

Audition city	Open audition date	Open audition venue
Dublin	8–9 April 2015	Croke Park
Newcastle	11–12 April 2015	St. James' Park
Leeds	16–17 April 2015	Elland Road
Birmingham	18–19 April 2015	St Andrew's
Glasgow	23–24 April 2015	Ibrox Stadium
Liverpool	26–27 April 2015	ACC Liverpool
Cardiff	29–30 April 2015	Mercure Holland House
Manchester	10 May 2015	EventCity
London	7 June 2015	The SSE Arena, Wembley

==== Judges' auditions ====
This series, the judges only visited Manchester (EventCity) and London (The SSE Arena, Wembley) on the audition tour, rather than going all around the UK as in previous series. The auditions were originally scheduled to begin in Manchester on 6 July; however, following the death of Cowell's mother on 5 July, the first two days of auditions were postponed to 8 July. As a result, a new day of auditions was announced for 9 July, but this last-minute addition meant that both Ora and Flack were absent due to prior commitments, resulting in just three judges that day and Murs having to host solo. The first day of London auditions were scheduled to be recorded on 14 July, but were cancelled due to the aforementioned bereavement. Flack was also absent from filming on 15 July due to her filming the Love Island final in Spain. Grimshaw had to leave the evening sessions (15, 16, 17, 19, 20 July) of auditions early due to the session over-running and his contract obligated him to have a certain amount of rest between finishing filming and being on BBC Radio 1 the following morning. Filming was delayed on 20 July due to Fernandez-Versini suffering a burns injury to her foot after stepping on some hair tongs. Cowell was absent from the first session on 17 July due to illness. Ora was again absent from filming on 22 July, due to performing a prearranged gig in Italy.

Notable returning audition contestants included Havva Rebke, who reached bootcamp in series 9; Monica Michael, who was controversially eliminated during the six chair challenge in series 11; and Rumour Has It, who reached judges' houses in series 11 as an unnamed girl group created by the judges. Other notable auditionees included MJ Mytton Sanneh and Mitchell Zhangazha members of boy band Tribe previously finished third in the fifth series of Britain’s Got Talent as members of New Bounce.

Summary of judges' auditions
City	Date(s)	Venue	Absent judges
Manchester	8–9 July 2015	EventCity	Rita Ora (9 July)
London	15–17 July 2015	The SSE Arena, Wembley	Simon Cowell (17 July)
London	19–23 July 2015	The SSE Arena, Wembley	Rita Ora (22 July)

=== Bootcamp ===
Bootcamp took place from 27 to 31 July, and was recorded at The Grove Hotel, Watford, having taken place at The SSE Arena, Wembley every other series. The first challenge of bootcamp was to perform in groups of five contestants, with a mix of at least three categories in each group, and perform a song from a list. The judges would decide immediately after each performance which of the 180 contestants would pass the challenge and which would be eliminated. For the second challenge of bootcamp, the 93 successful contestants were to perform a solo performance to the judges, who gave little or no feedback to them. At the end of the challenge, the judges decided on who would be successful and who would be eliminated. Grimshaw was absent from the second day of the challenge due to his commitments with BBC Radio 1, although partially assisted Cowell, Fernandez-Versini and Ora with their decisions via Skype video link. The 64 contestants that passed through this stage went on to face the six-chair challenge. It was reported that the standard of auditions were so high that acts who got a "yes" from all four judges were not necessarily guaranteed a place at bootcamp.

For the first time in X Factor history, viewers voted via hashtags on Twitter to determine which of the judges was allocated each of the four categories (for example, #SimonBoys or #RitaGroups). The judges learnt the result during the six-seat challenge. Ora was in charge of the Girls, Cowell was assigned the Over 27s, Fernandez-Versini had the Groups and Grimshaw looked after the Boys.

Bootcamp aired over two episodes on 20 and 27 September.

=== Six-chair challenge ===
The six-chair challenge took place on 1 and 2 September, at The SSE Arena, Wembley. 64 contestants faced the six-chair challenge, with 16 in the Girls category, 16 in the Boys, 17 in the Over 27s, and 15 in the Groups. The challenge was broadcast on 4, 11 and 18 October. At the start of the challenge, the judges discovered which categories they would mentor: Ora was given the Girls, Cowell was given Over 27s, Fernandez-Versini was given the Groups and Grimshaw was given the Boys.

Tom Bleasby was originally put through, but it was reported on 12 October that he had withdrawn for personal reasons. On 15 October, it was announced that Mason Noise would replace Bleasby at Judges' Houses.

On 20 October, it was revealed that all the groups would undergo name changes due to copyright reasons. The new names were revealed as 4th Impact (4th Power), Alien Uncovered (Alien), BEKLN Mile (BEKLN), Melody Stone (Silver Tone), New Kings Order (The First Kings) and Reggie 'n' Bollie (Menn On Point)

=== Judges' houses ===
The X Factor resumed its usual Saturday and Sunday night slots for judges' houses, taking place over one weekend (24–25 October). Murs and Flack did not appear at judges' houses, but filmed from the studio. Judges' houses was planned to be broadcast fully live, and recorded back-to-back, but on 15 September, it was announced that this would not happen as it would cause logistical problems. Instead, the judges' houses performances were pre-recorded in the scheduled destinations, with all of the contestants who made it to that stage of the competition brought to London afterwards to watch the performances and find out if they had made it through to the live shows during a live broadcast. This was the only portion of judges' houses that was broadcast live.

On 1 October, the guest judges for the judges' houses stage were revealed. Meghan Trainor assisted Ora in Los Angeles, Cowell's assistant was Louis Tomlinson, joining him in the Loire Valley, France, Fernandez-Versini was joined by Jess Glynne in Rome and Mark Ronson helped Grimshaw in the Cotswolds.

Judges Houses Performances

Girls:

- Louisa: "Respect"
- Lauren: "Take Me Home"
- Kiera: "Show Me Love"
- Monica: My Angel (original song)
- Chloe: "A Little Respect"
- Havva: "Hold On, We're Going Home"

Boys:

- Mason: "Lost Without U"
- Che: "Don't Know Much"
- Seann: "This Woman's Work"
- Ben: "Yours"
- Simon: "Too Lost in You"
- Josh: "Style"

Groups:

- Reggie N Boille: "Twist and Shout"
- 4th Impact: "Love the Way You Lie (Part II)"
- Alien Undercovered: "Bad Girl"
- Melody Stone: "Heaven"
- New Kings Order: "This I Promise You"
- BEKLN Mile: "Lay Me Down"

Over 27s:

- Anton: "Superstar"
- Max: "Gangsta's Paradise"
- Jennifer: "Drag Me Down"
- Bupsi: "Pony"
- Kerri-Anne: "Best of My Love"
- Ebru: "Photograph"

Summary of judges' houses
Judge	Category	Location	Assistant	Contestants Eliminated
Cowell	Over 27s	Loire Valley, France	Louis Tomlinson	Ebru Ellis, Jennifer Phillips, Kerrie-Anne Phillips
Fernandez-Versini	Groups	Rome	Jess Glynne	BEKLN Mile, Melody Stone, New Kings Order
Grimshaw	Boys	Cotswolds	Mark Ronson	Ben Clark, Josh Daniel, Simon Lynch
Ora	Girls	Los Angeles	Meghan Trainor	Monica Michael, Chloe Paige, Havva Rebke

After being eliminated, Monica Michael was reinstated as a wildcard before the live shows.

== Acts ==
Key:

– Winner
– Runner-Up
– Wildcard (Live Shows)

Act	Age(s)	Hometown	Category (mentor)	Result
Louisa Johnson	17	Chafford Hundred	Girls (Ora)	Winner
Reggie 'n' Bollie	29 & 31	Ghana / UK	Groups (Fernandez-Versini)	Runner-Up
Ché Chesterman	19	Basildon	Boys (Grimshaw)	3rd Place
Lauren Murray	25	North London	Girls (Ora)	4th Place
4th Impact	19–28	Santiago, Philippines	Groups (Fernandez-Versini)	5th Place
Anton Stephans	44	Suffolk	Over 27s (Cowell)	6th Place
Mason Noise	22	Birmingham	Boys (Grimshaw)	7th Place
Monica Michael	26	North London	Girls (Ora)	8th Place
Max Stone	27	London	Over 27s (Cowell)	9th Place
Seann Miley Moore	25	Sydney, Australia	Boys (Grimshaw)	10th Place
Kiera Weathers	18	St. Helens	Girls (Ora)	11th Place
Alien Uncovered	17–24	Various	Groups (Fernandez-Versini)	12th Place
Bupsi	38	Leeds	Over 27s (Cowell)	13th Place

== Live shows ==
This year, there were seven weeks of live shows instead of the usual ten. ITV were contractually obliged to show all of Home Nation's Rugby World Cup games in October, some of which take place during The X Factor‍'s Saturday night slot. One option that was considered was to air a bumper show on Sunday nights on these weekends, while some reports suggested that the live shows would run for a fewer number of weeks, launching after the World Cup. In fact, bootcamp aired during the Rugby World Cup and the live shows began on 31 October and continued until 13 December, airing every Saturday and Sunday night in the regular timeslots. Due to the omission of three live shows and the introduction of the wildcard act, the first four live shows were all double eliminations. The Xtra Factor moved its Saturday episode to Thursdays, being broadcast before the live shows, starting on 29 October. with the Sunday episode remaining the same. The Saturday edition of The Xtra Factor was reinstated for the final alongside the Thursday and Sunday editions.

=== Musical guests ===
The performance shows took place on Saturday night with the results show airing on Sunday night. Each results show featured guest performances, with some guests performing during the main performance show. The X Factor series 11 winner Ben Haenow performed on the first live show on 31 October, whilst series 8 winners Little Mix and Ellie Goulding performed on the first live results show on 1 November. Series 11 runner up Fleur East and CeeLo Green performed on the second live results show on 8 November, whilst Jess Glynne and series 7 contestants One Direction performed during the third live results show on 15 November. The fourth live show featured a performance from Rudimental featuring Ed Sheeran, while Nathan Sykes and Murs performed on the fourth live results show on 22 November. The quarter-final results show on 29 November featured performances from Carrie Underwood, and Sigma and Ora. Jason Derulo and Sia performed during the semi-final results on 6 December. The live final on 12 December featured duets from Leona Lewis and Ben Haenow, and Little Mix and Fleur East. and a performance from Rod Stewart. The results show on 13 December featured performances from One Direction, Coldplay and Adele.

=== Results summary ===
Colour key

Act in Boys

Act in Girls

Act in Over 27s

Act in Groups

–	Act was in the bottom two/three and had to perform again in the sing-off
–	Act received the fewest public votes and was immediately eliminated (no sing-off)
–	Act received the fewest public votes on Saturday night and was immediately eliminated
–	Act received the most public votes

Weekly results per act
Act	Week 1	Week 2	Week 3	Week 4	Quarter-Final	Semi-Final	Final	
Act	Week 1	Week 2	Week 3	Week 4	Quarter-Final	Semi-Final	Saturday Vote	Sunday Vote
Louisa Johnson	1st 15.9%	1st 15.3%	1st 16.4%	2nd 21.5%	3rd 21.1%	1st 31.5%	1st 44.5%	Winner; 53.9%^{1}
Reggie 'n' Bollie	7th 7.4%	2nd 13.0%	5th 13.0%	1st 21.6%	2nd 22.1%	2nd 27.0%	2nd 35.2%	Runner-Up; 38.9%^{1}
Ché Chesterman	5th 8.7%	3rd 12.5%	3rd 14.0%	5th 12.8%	1st 22.2%	3rd 20.9%	3rd 20.3%	Eliminated (final)
Lauren Murray	6th 8.4%	4th 11.2%	2nd 14.1%	3rd 14.8%	4th 18.4%	4th 20.6%	Eliminated (semi-final)	
4th Impact	2nd 11.2%	5th 9.0%	4th 13.2%	4th 13.8%	5th 16.2%	Eliminated (quarter-final)		
Anton Stephans	3rd 10.7%	7th 7.5%	7th 8.0%	6th 12.3%	Eliminated (week 4)			
Mason Noise	9th 6.1%	9th 6.1%	6th 9.8%	7th 3.2%^{2}	Eliminated (week 4)			
Monica Michael	4th 9.1%	8th 6.3%	8th 6.1%	Eliminated (week 3)				
Max Stone	10th 5.8%	6th 8.5%	9th 5.4%	Eliminated (week 3)				
Seann Miley Moore	8th 7.3%	10th 5.5%	Eliminated (week 2)					
Kiera Weathers	12th 3.4%	11th 5.1%	Eliminated (week 2)					
Alien Uncovered	11th 4.8%	Eliminated (week 1)						
Bupsi	13th 1.2%	Eliminated (week 1)						
Sing-Off	Alien Uncovered, Weathers	Moore, Noise	Michael, Stephans	Chesterman, Stephans	4th Impact, Murray	Chesterman, Murray	No sing-off or judges' votes: results were based on public votes alone	
Grimshaw's vote to eliminate (Boys)	Alien Uncovered	Moore	Michael	Stephans	4th Impact	Murray	No sing-off or judges' votes: results were based on public votes alone	
Ora's vote to eliminate (Girls)	Alien Uncovered	Moore	Stephans	Stephans	4th Impact	Chesterman	No sing-off or judges' votes: results were based on public votes alone	
Fernandez-Versini's vote to eliminate (Groups)	Weathers	Noise	Stephans	Stephans	Murray	Murray	No sing-off or judges' votes: results were based on public votes alone	
Cowell's vote to eliminate (Over 27s)	Alien Uncovered	Noise	Michael	Chesterman	Murray	Chesterman	No sing-off or judges' votes: results were based on public votes alone	
Eliminated	Bupsi; 1.2% to save	Kiera Weathers; 5.1% to save	Max Stone; 5.4% to save	Mason Noise; 3.2% to save	4th Impact; 2 of 4 votes Deadlock	Lauren Murray; 2 of 4 votes Deadlock	Ché Chesterman; 20.3% to win	Reggie 'n' Bollie; 38.9% to win
Eliminated	Alien Uncovered; 3 of 4 votes Majority	Seann Miley Moore; 2 of 4 votes Deadlock	Monica Michael; 2 of 4 votes Deadlock	Anton Stephans; 3 of 4 votes Majority	4th Impact; 2 of 4 votes Deadlock	Lauren Murray; 2 of 4 votes Deadlock	Ché Chesterman; 20.3% to win	Reggie 'n' Bollie; 38.9% to win
Reference(s)								

- ^1 The voting percentages in the final for the Sunday Vote do not add up to 100%, owing to the freezing of votes. Ché Chesterman received 7.2% of the final vote.
- ^2 Noise was eliminated on Saturday night, and his votes were frozen afterwards. The figure shown indicates the percentage of the final vote received by Noise.

=== Live show details ===
==== Week 1 (31 October/1 November) ====
- Theme: "This Is Me"
- Group performance: "Perfect"
- Musical guests:
  - Saturday: Ben Haenow ("Second Hand Heart")
  - Sunday: Little Mix ("Love Me Like You"/"Black Magic") and Ellie Goulding ("On My Mind")
- Best bits song: "Change Your Life" (Alien Uncovered)

This week's results show featured a double elimination. The three acts with the fewest votes were announced as the bottom three and the act with the fewest public votes was then automatically eliminated. The remaining two acts then performed in the final showdown for the judges' votes.

Acts' performances on the first live show
Act	Category (mentor)	Order	Song	Result
Lauren Murray	Girls (Ora)	1	"I'm Every Woman"	Safe
Max Stone	Over 27s (Cowell)	2	"Someone like You"	Safe
Alien Uncovered	Groups (Fernandez-Versini)	3	"Do It like a Dude"	Bottom Three
Kiera Weathers	Girls (Ora)	4	"Crying for No Reason"	Bottom Three
Anton Stephans	Over 27s (Cowell)	5	"Dance with My Father"	Safe
Ché Chesterman	Boys (Grimshaw)	6	"Tears Dry on Their Own"/"Ain't No Mountain High Enough"	Safe
Mason Noise	Boys (Grimshaw)	7	"Sorry"	Safe
Reggie 'n' Bollie	Groups (Fernandez-Versini)	8	"It Wasn't Me"	Safe
Louisa Johnson	Girls (Ora)	9	"God Only Knows"	Safe (Highest Votes)
Bupsi	Over 27s (Cowell)	10	"You're a Wonderful One"	Eliminated
4th Impact	Groups (Fernandez-Versini)	11	"Problem"	Safe
Monica Michael	Girls (Ora)	12	"Make It Rain"	Safe
Seann Miley Moore	Boys (Grimshaw)	13	"Life on Mars"	Safe
Sing-off details
Alien Uncovered	Groups (Fernandez-Versini)	1	"Pressure (Pt. 1)"	Eliminated
Kiera Weathers	Girls (Ora)	2	"Everybody Hurts"	Saved

Judges' votes to eliminate

- Fernandez-Versini: Kiera Weathers – backed her own act, Alien Uncovered.
- Ora: Alien Uncovered – backed her own act, Kiera Weathers, who she said had more to give.
- Grimshaw: Alien Uncovered – based on the sing-off performances.
- Cowell: Alien Uncovered – based on the sing-off performances.

However, voting statistics revealed that Alien Uncovered received more votes than Weathers which meant that if Cowell sent the result to deadlock, Alien Uncovered would have been saved.

==== Week 2 (7/8 November) ====
- Theme: "Reinvention" (taking a classic or popular song and making it their own)
- Group performance: "Fix You"
- Musical guests: Fleur East ("Sax") and CeeLo Green ("Music to My Soul")

This week's results show featured a double elimination. The three acts with the fewest votes were announced as the bottom three and the act with the fewest public votes was then automatically eliminated. The remaining two acts then performed in the final showdown for the judges' votes.

Acts' performances on the second live show
Act	Category (mentor)	Order	Song	Result
4th Impact	Groups (Fernandez-Versini)	1	"Sound of the Underground"/"The Clapping Song"	Safe
Mason Noise	Boys (Grimshaw)	2	"Teardrops"	Bottom Three
Anton Stephans	Over 27s (Cowell)	3	"All About That Bass"/"Bang Bang"	Safe
Kiera Weathers	Girls (Ora)	4	"Return of the Mack"	Eliminated
Ché Chesterman	Boys (Grimshaw)	5	"You Can't Hurry Love"	Safe
Louisa Johnson	Girls (Ora)	6	"Billie Jean"	Safe (Highest Votes)
Seann Miley Moore	Boys (Grimshaw)	7	"California Dreamin'"	Bottom Three
Monica Michael	Girls (Ora)	8	"Crazy in Love"	Safe
Max Stone	Over 27s (Cowell)	9	"Over the Rainbow"/"What a Wonderful World"	Safe
Reggie 'n' Bollie	Groups (Fernandez-Versini)	10	"What Makes You Beautiful"/"Cheerleader"	Safe
Lauren Murray	Girls (Ora)	11	"Hold Back the River"	Safe
Sing-off details
Mason Noise	Boys (Grimshaw)	1	"End of the Road"	Saved
Seann Miley Moore	Boys (Grimshaw)	2	"A Song for You"	Eliminated

Judges' votes to eliminate

- Cowell: Mason Noise – based on the sing-off performances, though he said he did not want to send either contestant home.
- Fernandez-Versini: Mason Noise – based on the sing-off performances.
- Ora: Seann Miley Moore – stated that although Moore performed better in the sing off, Noise had survived all the obstacles in the competition and had more to give.
- Grimshaw: Seann Miley Moore – could not decide between two of his own acts and sent the result to deadlock.

With the acts in the sing-off receiving two votes each, the result went to deadlock and reverted to the earlier public vote. Seann Miley Moore was eliminated as the act with the fewest public votes.

==== Week 3 (14/15 November) ====
- Theme: Songs from films (billed as "Movie Week")
- Group performance: "Flashdance... What a Feeling"
- Musical guests: Jess Glynne ("Take Me Home") and One Direction ("Perfect")

As a mark of respect following the November 2015 Paris attacks it was announced that Lauren Murray and Monica Michael would change their songs. Murray was due to perform "Licence to Kill" and Michael would have performed "Bang Bang (My Baby Shot Me Down)".

At the beginning of the results show, it was announced that the acts who made it through this week would be on The X Factor Live Tour 2016 (Seann Miley Moore was later given a place on the tour).

This week's results show featured a double elimination. The three acts with the fewest votes were announced as the bottom three and the act with the fewest public votes was automatically eliminated. The remaining two acts then performed in the final showdown for the judges' votes.

Acts' performances on the third live show
Act	Category (mentor)	Order	Song	Film	Result
Mason Noise	Boys (Grimshaw)	1	"Men in Black"	Men in Black	Safe
Max Stone	Over 27s (Cowell)	2	"Secret Garden"	Jerry Maguire	Eliminated
Louisa Johnson	Girls (Ora)	3	"Everybody's Free (To Feel Good)"	Romeo + Juliet	Safe (Highest Votes)
Monica Michael	Girls (Ora)	4	"What Is Love?"	N/A	Bottom Three
Reggie 'n' Bollie	Groups (Fernandez-Versini)	5	"My Heart Will Go On"/"Who Let the Dogs Out?"	Titanic/Rugrats in Paris: The Movie	Safe
Anton Stephans	Over 27s (Cowell)	6	"I Have Nothing"	The Bodyguard	Bottom Three
4th Impact	Groups (Fernandez-Versini)	7	"Work It Out"	Austin Powers in Goldmember	Safe
Lauren Murray	Girls (Ora)	8	"One Last Time"	N/A	Safe
Ché Chesterman	Boys (Grimshaw)	9	"When a Man Loves a Woman"	When a Man Loves a Woman	Safe
Sing-off details
Monica Michael	Girls (Ora)	1	"Broken-Hearted Girl"		Eliminated
Anton Stephans	Over 27s (Cowell)	2	"If You Don't Know Me by Now"		Saved

Judges' votes to eliminate

- Grimshaw: Monica Michael – based on the sing-off performances.
- Ora: Anton Stephans – backed her own act, Monica Michael.
- Fernandez-Versini: Anton Stephans – believed Michael had further to go in the competition.
- Cowell: Monica Michael – backed his own act, Anton Stephans, despite supporting the unanimous decision by him and the other three judges to reinstate Michael as a wildcard act before the live shows began.

With the acts in the sing-off receiving two votes each, the result went to deadlock and reverted to the earlier public vote. Monica Michael was eliminated as the act with the fewest public votes.

==== Week 4 (21/22 November) ====
- Theme: "Love & Heartbreak"
- Group performance: "We Found Love"
- Musical guests:
  - Saturday: Rudimental featuring Ed Sheeran ("Lay It All on Me")
  - Sunday: Nathan Sykes ("Over and Over Again") and Olly Murs ("Kiss Me")

This week featured a double elimination. The first was on Saturday night, when the act with the fewest votes so far was immediately eliminated. Following this the voting was re-opened, and the two acts with the fewest votes on Sunday's results show then performed in the sing-off.

Acts' performances on the fourth live show
Act	Category (mentor)	Order	Song	Result
Ché Chesterman	Boys (Grimshaw)	1	"Yesterday"	Bottom Two
Anton Stephans	Over 27s (Cowell)	2	"One Sweet Day"	Bottom Two
4th Impact	Groups (Fernandez-Versini)	3	"Ain't No Other Man"	Safe
Lauren Murray	Girls (Ora)	4	"We Belong Together"	Safe
Mason Noise	Boys (Grimshaw)	5	"Jealous"	Eliminated
Louisa Johnson	Girls (Ora)	6	"Let It Go"	Safe
Reggie 'n' Bollie	Groups (Fernandez-Versini)	7	"Shut Up and Dance"/"Dangerous Love"	Safe (Highest Votes)
Sing-off details
Ché Chesterman	Boys (Grimshaw)	1	"If I Ain't Got You"	Saved
Anton Stephans	Over 27s (Cowell)	2	"I Can't Make You Love Me"	Eliminated

Judges' votes to eliminate

- Grimshaw: Anton Stephans – backed his own act, Ché Chesterman.
- Cowell: Ché Chesterman – backed his own act, Anton Stephans.
- Ora: Anton Stephans – based on the sing-off performances.
- Fernandez-Versini: Anton Stephans – felt that Chesterman would be better for the rest of the show and Stephans' future as an artist with concerts looked bright.

==== Week 5: Quarter-Final (28/29 November) ====
- Theme: Jukebox; judges' choice"
- Group performance: "Earth Song"
- Musical guests: Carrie Underwood ("Heartbeat") and Sigma and Rita Ora ("Coming Home")
- Best bits song: "Wide Awake"

This week was the first single elimination of the series. The act performed two songs this week; one picked by the mentors and one picked by the viewers. The public voted on Twitter for the songs the acts will perform. Each act had a choice of three songs and viewers could tweet a hashtag for the song they wanted them to sing. Voting opened at the end of the fourth live results show, and closed at midnight that night.

Song choices for the jukebox theme
Act	Category (mentor)	Song Choices	Result
4th Impact	Groups (Fernandez-Versini)		
4th Impact	Groups (Fernandez-Versini)	"Only Girl (In the World)"	Not Chosen
4th Impact	Groups (Fernandez-Versini)	"I'll Be There"	Chosen
4th Impact	Groups (Fernandez-Versini)	"Hollaback Girl"	Not Chosen
Ché Chesterman	Boys (Grimshaw)		
Ché Chesterman	Boys (Grimshaw)	"Hello"	Chosen
Ché Chesterman	Boys (Grimshaw)	"Jealous Guy"	Not Chosen
Ché Chesterman	Boys (Grimshaw)	"Runnin' (Lose It All)"	Not Chosen
Louisa Johnson	Girls (Ora)		Not Chosen
Louisa Johnson	Girls (Ora)	"It's a Man's Man's Man's World"	Not Chosen
Louisa Johnson	Girls (Ora)	"Jealous"	Not Chosen
Louisa Johnson	Girls (Ora)	"Love Yourself"	Chosen
Lauren Murray	Girls (Ora)	"You Don't Own Me"	Not Chosen
Lauren Murray	Girls (Ora)	"Best of My Love"	Not Chosen
Lauren Murray	Girls (Ora)	"Firestone"	Chosen
Reggie 'n' Bollie	Groups (Fernandez-Versini)		
Reggie 'n' Bollie	Groups (Fernandez-Versini)	"Dynamite"	Not Chosen
Reggie 'n' Bollie	Groups (Fernandez-Versini)	"Locked Away"	Not Chosen
Reggie 'n' Bollie	Groups (Fernandez-Versini)	"Watch Me (Whip/Nae Nae)"	Chosen

Acts' performances in the quarter-final
Act	Category (mentor)	Order	First song (public choice)	Order	Second song (mentor choice)	Result
Louisa Johnson	Girls (Ora)	1	"Love Yourself"	10	"Jealous"	Safe
4th Impact	Groups (Fernandez-Versini)	2	"I'll Be There"	6	"Fancy"/"Rich Girl"	Bottom Two
Reggie 'n' Bollie	Groups (Fernandez-Versini)	3	"Watch Me (Whip/Nae Nae)"/"Azonto"	9	"Dynamite"	Safe
Lauren Murray	Girls (Ora)	4	"Firestone"	8	"You Don't Own Me"	Bottom Two
Ché Chesterman	Boys (Grimshaw)	5	"Hello"	7	"Try a Little Tenderness"	Safe (Highest Votes)
Sing-off details
4th Impact	Groups (Fernandez-Versini)	1	"And I Am Telling You I'm Not Going"			Eliminated
Lauren Murray	Girls (Ora)	2	"Vision of Love"			Saved

Judge's vote to eliminate

- Ora: 4th Impact – backed her own act, Lauren Murray, who she said had a chance of a music career.
- Fernandez-Versini: Lauren Murray – backed her own act, 4th Impact, saying her heart lies with them and that they had a perfect sing-off performance.
- Grimshaw: 4th Impact – based on the sing-off performances.
- Cowell: Lauren Murray – gave no reason but praised both acts' sing-off performances.

With the acts in the sing-off receiving two votes each, the result went deadlock and reverted to the earlier public vote. 4th Impact were eliminated as the act with the fewest public votes.

==== Week 6: Semi-Final (5/6 December) ====
- Theme: "Songs to Get Me to the Final"
- Guest mentor: Lionel Richie
- Group performance: "Happy"
- Musical guests: Jason Derulo ("Want to Want Me") and Sia ("Alive")
- Best bits song: "Take Me Home"

Acts' performances in the semi-final
Act	Category (mentor)	Order	First song	Order	Second song	Result
Reggie 'n' Bollie	Groups (Fernandez-Versini)	1	"Locked Away"	8	"I Gotta Feeling"/"I Like to Move It"	Safe
Lauren Murray	Girls (Ora)	2	"Take Me Home"	7	"Runnin' (Lose It All)"	Bottom Two
Ché Chesterman	Boys (Grimshaw)	3	"Would I Lie to You?"	5	"Love Is a Losing Game"	Bottom Two
Louisa Johnson	Girls (Ora)	4	"The Power of Love"	6	"It's a Man's Man's Man's World"	Safe (Highest Votes)
Sing-off details
Lauren Murray	Girls (Ora)	1	"Fight Song"			Eliminated
Ché Chesterman	Boys (Grimshaw)	2	"Bridge over Troubled Water"			Saved

Judge's vote to eliminate

- Grimshaw: Lauren Murray – backed his own act, Ché Chesterman.
- Ora: Ché Chesterman – backed her own act, Lauren Murray.
- Fernandez-Versini: Lauren Murray – was worried Murray would struggle to manage the intensity of the final.
- Cowell: Ché Chesterman – could not decide and sent the result to deadlock; he later stated on The Xtra Factor that although Chesterman performed better in the sing-off, he also considered his likability for Murray.

With the acts in the sing-off receiving two votes each, the result went to deadlock and reverted to the earlier public vote. Lauren Murray was eliminated as the act with the fewest public votes.

==== Week 7: Final (12/13 December) ====
12 December

- Theme: New song (no theme); celebrity duet
- Musical guests: Ben Haenow and Leona Lewis ("Slamming Doors"/"Run"), Fleur East and Little Mix ("Black Magic"/"Sax"), and Rod Stewart ("Please")
- Mariah Carey appeared at the start of the show via VT to give some advice to the contestants.

Acts' performances on the Saturday Final
Contestant	Category (mentor)	Order	First song^{1}	Order	Second song (duet)	Result
Ché Chesterman	Boys (Grimshaw)	1	"Valerie"	4	"The First Cut Is the Deepest" (with Rod Stewart)	Eliminated
Reggie 'n' Bollie	Groups (Fernandez-Versini)	2	"Spice Up Your Life"/"Boom Boom Boom"	5	"Dangerous Love"/"Re-Rewind (The Crowd Say Bo Selecta)" (with Fuse ODG and Craig David)	Safe
Louisa Johnson	Girls (Ora)	3	"I Believe I Can Fly"	6	"And I Am Telling You I'm Not Going" (with Rita Ora)	Safe (Highest Votes)

^1 The contestants performed individual songs as they were introduced at the start of the show. Chesterman performed "In the Air Tonight", Johnson performed "Fighter" and Reggie 'n' Bollie performed "Jump", although these were not considered to be their first performances.

Ché Chesterman received the fewest public votes and was automatically eliminated.

13 December

- Theme: Song of the series; winner's single
- Group performance: "Downtown"/"Downtown" (all contestants except Mason Noise)
- Musical guests: Coldplay ("Adventure of a Lifetime"), One Direction ("Infinity"/"History") and Adele ("Hello")
- Following One Direction's performance of "Infinity", a VT was shown with good luck messages from Cowell, James Corden, Robbie Williams, Wayne Rooney, Danny DeVito, Jack Whitehall, Little Mix, 5 Seconds of Summer and David Beckham.
- Will Ferrell appeared via a VT during the results show to talk about the history of The X Factor

Acts' performances on the Sunday Final
Act	Category (mentor)	Order	Song of the series	Originally Performed in..	Order	Winner's single	Result
Reggie 'n' Bollie	Groups (Fernandez-Versini)	1	"What Makes You Beautiful"/"Cheerleader"/"I Like to Move It"	Live Show 2	3	"Forever Young"	Runner-Up
Louisa Johnson	Girls (Ora)	2	"It's a Man's Man's Man's World"	Live Show 6	4	"Forever Young"	Winner

== Reception ==
=== Ratings ===
Episode	Air date	Duration (minutes)^{1}	Share (%)	Official ITV rating (millions)^{,2}^{,3}	Official ITV HD rating (millions)^{,3}	Official ITV+1 rating (millions)^{,3}	Total viewers (millions)^{,3}	Weekly rank^{,4}
Auditions 1	29 August	90	35.9	7.34	1.79	0.64	9.77	2
Auditions 2	30 August	60	27.7	6.14	1.53	0.59	8.26	3
Auditions 3	5 September	75	32.8	6.88	1.84	0.44	9.16	3
Auditions 4	6 September	75	29.6	6.44	1.52	0.45	8.41	4
Auditions 5	12 September	75	36.5	7.23	1.78	0.40	9.41	2
Auditions 6	13 September	60	30.9	6.77	1.58	0.40	8.75	3
Auditions 7	19 September	90	32.2	6.89	1.64	0.37	8.90	3
Bootcamp 1	20 September	120	31.3	6.48	1.74	0.48	8.70	4
Bootcamp 2	27 September	120	31.3	6.33	1.63	0.44	8.40	7
Six-chair challenge 1	4 October	120	30.8	6.67	1.66	0.43	8.76	4
Six-chair challenge 2	11 October	120	29.7	6.87	1.66	0.48	9.01	4
Six-chair challenge 3	18 October	120	31.1	6.79	1.82	0.40	9.01	4
Judges' houses 1	24 October	145	29.6	6.08	1.69	0.42	8.19	5
Judges' houses 2	25 October	90	25.5	5.57	1.57	0.41	7.55	10
Live show 1	31 October	145	27.4	5.32	1.63	0.30	7.25	11
Live results 1	1 November	60	27.3	5.65	1.52	0.23	7.40	9
Live show 2	7 November	130	30.2	6.03	1.57	0.27	7.87	6
Live results 2	8 November	60	28.7	5.92	1.58	—N/a^{2}	7.50	8
Live show 3	14 November	105	28.6	5.64	1.63	0.23	7.50	11
Live results 3	15 November	60	29.2	6.10	1.58	—N/a^{2}	7.68	8
Live show 4	21 November	100	29.0	6.11	1.54	—N/a^{2}	7.65	11
Live results 4	22 November	60	33.0	5.64	—N/a^{5}	—N/a^{2}	5.64	26
Live show 5	28 November	105	28.9	5.77	1.66	—N/a^{2}	7.43	12
Live results 5	29 November	60	26.7	5.65	—N/a^{5}	—N/a^{2}	5.65	28
Live show 6	5 December	90	29.3	5.93	1.47	0.27	7.67	11
Live results 6	6 December	60	27.1	5.52	1.59	—N/a^{2}	7.11	13
Live final	12 December	125	26.5	5.21	1.55	0.26	7.02	8
Live final results	13 December	120	33.8	6.84	1.98	—N/a^{2}	8.82	3
Series average		—N/a	30.0	6.21	1.58^{6}	0.40^{7}	8.02	—N/a

^{1} Includes advert breaks
^{2} The ITV+1 figure for this episode is unavailable as it was outside the top 10 programmes of the week on BARB.
^{3} The ratings over a 7-day period, including the original broadcast and streaming through ITV Player.
^{4} The rank for the ITV broadcast, compared with all channels for that week, from Monday to Sunday.
^{5} The ITV HD figure for this episode is unavailable as it was outside the top 10 programmes of the week on BARB.
^{6} The average figure for ITV HD includes only the episodes with figures available.
^{7} The average figure for ITV+1 includes only the episodes with figures available.

== Controversies ==
=== Bootcamp ===
It was reported that before bootcamp, some contestants who were given three or four "yes" votes from the judges were sent emails from the producers of the show saying that they would not be attending bootcamp due to limited places and a higher standard of auditions. One contestant who received such an email said, "I feel X Factor needs to be shamed for this shocking incident. They are playing with people's lives." A spokesperson for the show said this was "kinder and fairer than an immediate 'cull' of singers on arrival at bootcamp, which has happened in previous series."

=== Mason Noise ===
During the six-seat challenge, after performing for his mentor Grimshaw, Noise complained that his audition was only broadcast for 47 seconds while other contestants were featured for up to 10 minutes. Cowell responded by saying "You should feel lucky to be on this show. Why don't you shut up?" and called Noise an "arsehole". Noise was booed by the crowd before walking off the stage. Noise later told the Daily Mirror: "[Cowell] lost control and it was uncalled for. Especially as all I was doing was saying an opinion. I think that no one has ever questioned him before and no one has questioned the format of the show. Something needs to change on that show. Listen to the kids, at the end of the day I have a lot of support on Twitter."

On 12 October, Tom Bleasby had withdrawn from the show and consequently, there was a spare place at judges' houses. On 15 October, Grimshaw announced that Noise would replace Bleasby at judges' houses.

=== Caroline Flack and Olly Murs ===
Presenters Flack and Murs were criticised throughout the series. Flack's absence from several auditions caused confusion and their lack of chemistry was criticised, with a source from the show saying, "Bosses have been aware of the criticism aimed at Olly and Caroline over their lack of chemistry. They were expected to inject some fun and energy but that has yet to be seen. We've seen this year's line-up undertake a big shake-up and Olly and Caroline were considered to be a safe bet." It was also stated that Flack's other commitments were discussed beforehand. A spokesperson said: "Olly and Caroline have been great additions to the show, We're very happy with them and look forward to them being centre stage when presenting on the live shows at the end of the month."

In week 3, Murs apologised after claiming that Michael had been eliminated when in fact the result went to deadlock and yet to be revealed; in any case, Michael was revealed afterwards to have received the fewest public votes and voted out. Murs said: "I apologise to everyone tonight I made a massive f—k up at the end. It was so tense!! I'm still learning & hope that never happens again!" Isabel Mohan from The Daily Telegraph said, "We were always dreading Flack and Murs taking over from Dermot O'Leary—we knew they wouldn't be able to hack it live on primetime telly. Dermot could build up tension. Dermot could read autocues. Dermot could speak properly with no lazy talk of 'the bottom free'. And, most of all, Dermot didn't tell people they'd been voted off before he was supposed to! [...] What an absolute shambles." O'Leary supported Murs on Twitter, saying it "Happens to us all" and "live TV is a tricky old beast at times."
