= Infinity (One Direction song) =

Promotional single by One Direction

from the album Made in the A.M.
- Released: 22 September 2015
- Recorded: 2015
- Length: 4:09
- Label: Syco; Sony
- Songwriters: Jamie Scott; John Ryan; Julian Bunetta
- Producers: Bunetta; Ryan

"Infinity" is a song by Irish-British boy band One Direction from their fifth studio album, Made in the A.M. (2015). It was released as a single on iTunes and Apple Music on 22 September 2015. The song was at first announced as the third official single from the album, but was eventually scrapped in favour of "History".

== Background ==
On 22 September 2015, One Direction announced the name of their album, Made in the A.M. and released "Infinity" as a promotional single along with the pre-order of the album. The cover art of the song also features a picture of One Direction's fragrance, Between Us. On 12 November, One Direction gave the first live performance of the song on BBC Radio 1. The band also performed the single at the final of The X Factor on 13 December 2015. Harry Styles stated that "Infinity" was one of the track's he was proudest of. The promo track was certified Gold in Italy for over 25,000 units in March 2016.

The song was supposed to be accompanied by a music video, but it was replaced by "History" as the album's third single, and the video was never finished.

== Composition ==
"Infinity" was written by Jamie Scott, John Ryan, and Julian Bunetta, while production was handled by Ryan and Bunetta. According to the sheet music published at Musicnotes.com, by Alfred Music Publishing, the track runs at 132 BPM and is in the key of E major. Louis Tomlinson stated that "Infinity" was, "one that we played on the first day of writing."

== Critical reception ==
Daniela Cabrera of Bustle wrote that she "heard traces of "Stop and Stare" by OneRepublic and a little bit of fellow Brit rockers, Keane and Coldplay" while adding that the song "is soaring, beautiful, and quite catchy" and that the "lyrics will hit home for anyone who's lost love". Ella Ceron of Teen Vogue stated that the track, "tries to hit the uncanny ground of pairing a slightly uptempo beat and swooping guitar riffs with lyrics that will rip you to shreds." She also added, "It is the kind of song you listen to on loop, or as part of a secret mix, the one you say you're only going to listen to when you really need to feel something."

Nick Levine of NME remarked, "'Infinity' reaches its peak as the final minute approaches and the producers super-size its sound with some big stadium drums and ravey synth riffs." Madeline Roth of MTV described the song as "a beautiful, Coldplay-esque ballad that builds and builds until it reaches a soaring, chill-inducing crescendo about two-thirds of the way in." Glenn Gamboa of Newsday called the track, "a mellower slice of guitar pop."

Jason Lipshutz of Billboard had a more negative review, stating that the "new ballad was limited by lyrics" and that "a unmemorable arrangement of kick drum and glistening guitar also helps 'Infinity' sound hamstrung by its clumsy lyrics", but he complimented the group's vocals, stating that the band "sounds vocally accomplished on "Infinity" in spite of the absence of Zayn Malik".

== Charts ==
Chart (2015)	Peak position
Australia (ARIA)	22
Austria (Ö3 Austria Top 40)	18
Canada Hot 100 (Billboard)	40
Czech Republic Singles Digital (ČNS IFPI)	47
Euro Digital Song Sales (Billboard)	5
Finland (Suomen virallinen lista)	12
France (SNEP)	24
Greece Digital Songs (Billboard)	2
Hungary (Single Top 40)	5
Hungary (Stream Top 40)	10
Ireland (IRMA)	38
Italy (FIMI)	10
Netherlands (Single Top 100)	59
New Zealand (Recorded Music NZ)	28
Portugal Digital Song Sales (Billboard)	5
Scottish Singles Sales (Official Charts)	15
Slovakia Singles Digital (ČNS IFPI)	21
South Korea International Chart (GAON)	67
Spain (Promusicae)	19
Sweden (Sverigetopplistan)	42
Switzerland (Schweizer Hitparade)	34
UK Singles (Official Charts)	36
US Billboard Hot 100	54

== Certifications ==
Region	Certification	Certified units/sales
Australia (ARIA)	Gold	35,000^{‡}
Italy (FIMI)	Gold	25,000^{‡}
Mexico (AMPROFON)	Gold	30,000^{‡}
New Zealand (RMNZ)	Gold	15,000^{‡}
United Kingdom (BPI)	Silver	200,000^{‡}
^{‡} Sales+streaming figures based on certification alone.
