= Home (One Direction song) =

Promotional single by One Direction

from the EP Perfect
- Released: 16 October 2015
- Recorded: 2015
- Genre: Indie pop
- Length: 3:15
- Label: Syco; Sony
- Songwriter(s): Jamie Scott; Louis Tomlinson; Liam Payne
- Producer(s): Jamie Scott; Daniel Bryer; Mike Needle

"Home" is a song by English-Irish boy band One Direction from their EP Perfect. It was released as part of the digital EP on iTunes and Apple Music on 16 October 2015. The song is included as a bonus track on the Japanese version of Made in the A.M.. This song was written by Louis Tomlinson, Liam Payne, and Jamie Scott.

The song won a Teen Choice Award at the 2016 ceremony.

== Background ==
On 16 October 2015, One Direction released the second single "Perfect" from their fifth studio album, Made in the A.M., and released "Home" as a promotional single along with the purchase of the EP, Perfect, on 22 October. However, the track was leaked a day early on Spotify, which made the song reach number six on the Billboard Twitter Real-Time chart.

== Composition ==
"Home" was written by Louis Tomlinson, Liam Payne and Jamie Scott, while production was handled by Scott, Daniel Bryer and Mike Needle. The song has been described as "an emotional mid-tempo indie-pop track."

== Critical reception ==
Madeline Roth of MTV compared the lyrics to other One Direction song's such as "Don't Forget Where You Belong" and "Through The Dark". Ella Ceron of Teen Vogue stated, "'Home'... hits somewhere between the power ballads 1D already does so well, and the heartbreak anthem that makes us just want to hug our boys."

== Awards and nominations ==
Publication	Accolade	Year	Result	Ref.
Teen Choice Awards	Choice Music Single: Group	2016	Won	

== Charts ==
Chart performance for "Home"
Chart (2015)	Peak position
Australia (ARIA)	48
Austria (Ö3 Austria Top 40)	45
Belgium (Ultratop 50 Flanders)	37
Belgium (Ultratop 50 Wallonia)	47
Canadian Digital Songs (Billboard)	35
France (SNEP)	75
Scotland (OCC)	46
Slovakia (Singles Digitál Top 100)	91
Sweden Heatseeker (Sverigetopplistan)	12
UK Singles (OCC)	96
US Billboard Hot 100	74
