= Made in the A.M. =

2015 album by One Direction

Studio album by One Direction
- Released: 13 November 2015
- Recorded: February–July 2015
- Genres: Pop; pop rock
- Length: 44:39
- Labels: Columbia; Syco
- Producers: Julian Bunetta; Jesse Shatkin; John Ryan; Afterhrs; Johan Carlsson; Jamie Scott

One Direction chronology
Four (2014)	Made in the A.M. (2015)

Singles from Made in the A.M.
- 1. "Drag Me Down" Released: 31 July 2015; 2. "Perfect" Released: 16 October 2015; 3. "History" Released: 6 November 2015

Made in the A.M. is the fifth and final studio album by English-Irish boy band One Direction, released on 13 November 2015 by Columbia Records and Syco Music. It was the band's only album without Zayn Malik, who left the group in March 2015, the last to feature member Liam Payne due to his death in October 2024, and the last released before the group entered an indefinite hiatus in January 2016. It was the year's sixth best-selling album worldwide, with 2.4 million copies sold, and received generally favourable critical reviews.

The album was preceded by the three singles: "Drag Me Down", released on 31 July 2015; "Perfect", released on 16 October 2015; and "History", released on 6 November 2015. All three reached the top 10 in a number of national charts.

The album itself debuted at number one on the UK Albums Chart with 93,189 copies, and at number two (behind Justin Bieber's Purpose) on the US Billboard 200, with 459,000 album-equivalent units in its first week, including 402,000 pure album sales. Defying predictions that interest in boy-band albums was declining, its first-week sales topped the 387,000 sold by the band's previous album, Four. Made in the A.M. was the second fastest-selling album of 2015 in the UK, surpassed only by Adele's 25.

== Release ==
The song that would be the album's lead single, "Drag Me Down", was released on 31 July 2015 with no previous promotion or warning. It debuted at number one on the UK Singles Chart, breaking the record for the most streamed song in its first week, with 2.03 million plays. In the United States, the song debuted at number three on the Billboard Hot 100 chart, with 350,000 downloads in its first week, earning the band their largest sales week ever. "Drag Me Down" also set a new Vevo record for most likes in 24 hours.

Shortly thereafter, the band announced that it would go on a temporary hiatus in 2016 to take a break. Julian Bunetta, the producer behind many of the group's songs, told Billboard in August that the fifth album was recorded with the four members knowing it would be their last for a while. "There was a feeling of, 'Well, we're going to take a break, and anything in the world can happen during that time off'", adding, "There's a song about losing someone that isn't Zayn. There's also a song about the band being on shaky ground and not knowing what the future is. There are songs about love, there's a song that is a little more sexually charged. It's all over the map."

On 22 September 2015, the title of the forthcoming album, Made in the A.M., was announced and a promotional single, "Infinity", was released on the iTunes Store and Apple Music.

In October, the group began to reveal the track listing on their Snapchat stories. "Perfect" was released as the album's second single on 16 October 2015. The song debuted at number two in the UK and number ten on the Billboard Hot 100 chart, giving the band their fifth top 10 start on the Hot 100, passing the record among groups of four debuts, previously held by The Beatles.

"What a Feeling" was released as the second promotional single on 11 November 2015, two days before the album itself.

Although "Infinity" was announced as the album's third single by member Liam Payne, "History" was later confirmed as the next single. On 27 January 2016, the official music video for "History" was released to the One Direction Vevo channel and YouTube. It peaked at number six on the UK Official Chart in 2016.

In December, the band members said this album represented their best work because they helped write and compose most of the songs.

== Critical reception ==
Professional ratings
Aggregate scores
Source	Rating
AnyDecentMusic?	6.3/10
Metacritic	65/100
Review scores
Source	Rating
AllMusic	4/5 stars
The A.V. Club	B
Billboard	4/5 stars
Drowned in Sound	5/10
Entertainment Weekly	B
Financial Times	3/5 stars
The Guardian	3/5 stars
NME	2/5 stars
Rolling Stone	4/5 stars
Spin	6/10
USA Today	2.5/4 stars

Made in the A.M. received generally favourable reviews from music critics. At Metacritic, which assigns a weighted average rating out of 100 from selected independent ratings and reviews from mainstream critics, the album received a Metascore of 65, based on 11 reviews, indicating "generally favourable reviews".

Neil McCormick of The Daily Telegraph wrote that "a slight tone of weariness may have crept into 1D's lyrics with songs about break-ups and yearning for home but musically it remains anthemic, up-tempo, superior pop, with elegant song structure, ear worm hooks and radio busting choruses". Although Kenneth Partridge of Billboard magazine declared that the album "could be the band's Abbey Road" and awarded it four stars, he also critiqued the group as a "prefab 21st-century pop machine" who churns out "boilerplate love songs that rarely feel personal or look beyond" their "vacuum-sealed bubble-gum world". Writing for Rolling Stone, Rob Sheffield stated that the album is "1D's Let It Be – the kind of record the world's biggest pop group makes when it's time to say thanks for the memories." Regarding the album's sound, he noted it is "chasing the rock vibe of Midnight Memories and Four". Leah Greenblatt of Entertainment Weekly complimented the album for being "another deft collection of shiny, hermetically sealed anthems".

Ella Cerón of Teen Vogue described the album as a "love letter" to the band's fans, praising the band members for "learning how to write their own songs" and developing an "evolved sound," while at the same time, "[staying] true to their original fan base." Cerón highlights the album's opening track, "Hey Angel," that it "sets the tone for the rest of the album."

Shira Benozilio of Hollywood Life called it "their most diverse album yet" while specifically highlighting the album opener, "Hey Angel", praising the "catchy, upbeat sound that is sure to put anyone in a good mood" while commenting that it had "an Oasis vibe". Patrick Ryan of USA Today commented that the group's "writing is sharper and their sound richer than before" and that "if Made in the A.M. ends up being One Direction's final album, it's not a bad swansong to go out on". Patrick Ryan, writing for Idolator, wrote that "it's an album that sounds like another day at the office for the group's remaining members, replete with ballads, soaring pop styles, an a cappella vocal group experiment, the aforementioned intense, late night "dark track" and that "the lads are as sincere and focused as ever, without any overt acknowledgement that this is the end of an era" while comparing songs on the album to the likes of Coldplay and Paul McCartney and Wings.

Tshepo Mokoena of The Guardian commented that the album is "a playful but reflective goodbye" and "just what their mourning fans need". Writing for SPIN, Alfred Soto wrote that the album includes more "sensitivity" than previous efforts while adding that the record offers "hits plus filler". Tim Sendra of AllMusic commented that the album "another slice of high-quality modern pop brought to life by the band's charm" and that "the album's mix of upbeat dance-pop songs, emotional midtempo songs, and big, gut-wrenching ballads is a familiar one". He added that the "other bandmembers pick up the slack [of Malik's absence] impressively" and that "their songwriting shows growth, their vocals remain flawless, the production team continues to throw the occasional curveball to go along with the softballs, and there are plenty of songs that sound like the best pop music has to offer in 2015". Annie Zaleski of The A.V. Club commented that the album "proudly (and prominently) feels indebted to other eras and totems of U.K. pop" while adding that the album "strives for timelessness" and that "even if the band members don't return from their break, they can rest easy: they've gone out on a high note, because Made in the A.M. is One Direction's best, most accomplished album". Lewis Corner, writing for Digital Spy wrote that the album "proves they have continued to push their style in unexpected ways", that it "rounds off a phenomenal chapter in their career, bringing together the pop, rock and folky influences that helped them go from teenage upstarts to a billion dollar industry", and that "for a group limited by the perception that they are just "boyband pop", their music has become as accomplished as their shining achievements".

Jon Caramanica of the New York Times had a more negative review, commenting that "the music is too banal to support exceptional singing" and that the album was "rootless and vague". He compared sounds of the album to the likes of Coldplay, Huey Lewis and the News, and The Bee Gees. Leah Greenblatt, writing with Entertainment Weekly commented that "the lyrics, with a few subtly naughty exceptions, are still largely crafted for listeners whose idea of romance is a Disney prince—dashing, devoted, and safely two-dimensional" and that "One Direction don't seem ready yet to explore their own more adult voices. Or maybe they're just saving it for their solo records". Kate Solomon of Drowned In Sound praised "Olivia", stating that it is the only song on the album "that sounds even vaguely like anyone is having any fun" while ending the review with "it's not that this album is particularly bad, it's that I don't understand why it isn't better".

== Commercial performance ==
In the UK, Made in the A.M. debuted at number one on the UK Albums Chart with first-week sales of 93,189, becoming their fourth album to top the chart and the fastest selling album of 2015 until that point, beating out Justin Bieber's album Purpose. The album was certified Silver by the British Phonographic Industry (BPI) in its first week, and certified Platinum on 1 January 2016, denoting shipments of 300,000 copies. The album debuted at number two on the Billboard 200 with 459,000 album-equivalent units (402,000 pure album sales), behind Justin Bieber's Purpose, becoming the band's first album to not debut at number one. As of July 2020, the album had sold a total of 2,000,000 copies in the United States, counting pure sales and streams.

== Track listing ==
Made In The A.M. – Standard edition
No.	Title	Writer(s)	Producer(s)	Length
1.	"Hey Angel"	Ed Drewett; John Ryan; Julian Bunetta	Bunetta; Ryan	4:00
2.	"Drag Me Down"	Jamie Scott; Ryan; Bunetta	Bunetta; Ryan	3:12
3.	"Perfect"	Harry Styles; Louis Tomlinson; Bunetta; Jacob Kasher; Ryan; Jesse Shatkin; Maureen Anne McDonald	Bunetta; Shatkin; Afterhrs	3:50
4.	"Infinity"	Ryan; Scott; Bunetta	Bunetta; Ryan	4:09
5.	"End of the Day"	Liam Payne; Tomlinson; Ryan; Bunetta; Drewett; Kasher; Gamal "LunchMoney" Lewis; Wayne Hector	Ryan; Bunetta	3:14
6.	"If I Could Fly"	Johan Carlsson; Styles; Ross Golan	Carlsson; Noah "Mailbox" Passovoy^{[v]}	3:50
7.	"Long Way Down"	Payne; Tomlinson; Scott; Ryan; Bunetta	Bunetta; Ryan	3:12
8.	"Never Enough"	Niall Horan; Ryan; Scott; Bunetta	Bunetta; Ryan	3:33
9.	"Olivia"	Styles; Ryan; Bunetta	Bunetta; Ryan	2:57
10.	"What a Feeling"	Scott; Mike Needle; Daniel Bryer; Tomlinson; Payne	Scott; Bunetta^{[a]}; Needle^{[v]}	3:20
11.	"Love You Goodbye"	Tomlinson; Bunetta; Kasher	Bunetta; Payne	3:16
12.	"I Want to Write You a Song"	Ammar Malik; Ryan; Bunetta	Bunetta; Ryan	2:59
13.	"History"	Payne; Tomlinson; Ryan; Bunetta; Drewett; Hector	Bunetta; Ryan	3:07
Total length:				44:39

Made in the A.M. – Deluxe edition (bonus tracks)
No.	Title	Writer(s)	Producer(s)	Length
14.	"Temporary Fix"	Horan; Hector; TMS	TMS	2:55
15.	"Walking in the Wind"	Styles; Bunetta; Scott; Ryan	Bunetta; Ryan	3:22
16.	"Wolves"	Horan; Will Champlin; Andrew Haas; Payne; Ian Franzino	Bunetta; Afterhrs	4:01
17.	"A.M."	Tomlinson; Payne; Horan; Styles; Hector; Ryan; Drewett; Bunetta	Bunetta; Ryan	3:29
Total length:				58:26

Made in the A.M. – iTunes deluxe edition (bonus videos)
No.	Title	Length
18.	"Backstage at the Apple Music Festival 2015"	5:52
19.	"Drag Me Down" (Live from the Apple Music Festival 2015)	3:04

Made in the A.M. – Japanese edition (bonus tracks)
No.	Title	Writer(s)	Producer(s)	Length
18.	"Home"	Scott; Tomlinson; Payne	Scott; Daniel Bryer^{[b]}; Needle^{[b]}	3:14
19.	"Night Changes" (Afterhrs Remix)	Bunetta; Scott; Ryan; Tomlinson; Payne; Horan; Styles; Zayn Malik	Bunetta; Ryan; Afterhrs	3:40
Total length:				65:20

Notes

- ^{^[v]} signifies a vocal producer
- ^{^[a]} signifies an additional producer

== Personnel ==
All personnel credits for Made in the A.M. are taken from the album's liner notes.)

OneDirection

- Liam Payne – lead vocals; background vocals (1–3, 5, 8, 10, 11, 13, "Home"); string arrangement (1); instrumentation (11); songwriting (5, 7, 10, 13, "Home"); production (11)
- Louis Tomlinson – lead vocals; background vocals (1–3, 5, 8, 10, 11, 13, "Home"); songwriting (3, 5, 7, 10, 11, 13, "Home")
- Niall Horan – lead vocals; background vocals (1–3, 5, 8, 10, 11, 13, "Home"); songwriting (8)
- Harry Styles – lead vocals; background vocals (1–3, 5, 8, 10, 11, 13, "Home", "); songwriting (3, 6, 9)

Additional musicians

- Julian Bunetta – all instruments (1–4, 7, 9–13) including guitars (2) and programming (2, 10); background vocals (1–5, 7–13); string arrangement (1, 4, 9); brass arrangement (9); production (1–5, 7–9, 11–13); additional production (10); mixing (9); engineering (1–5, 7–9, 11–13); songwriting (1–5, 7–9, 11–13)
- John Ryan – all instruments (1, 2, 4, 5, 7–9, 12, 13)) including guitars and programming (2); background vocals (1–5, 7–9, 12, 13); string arrangement (1, 4, 9); brass arrangement (9); production (1, 2, 4, 5, 7–9, 12, 13); engineering (1–5, 7–9, 12, 13); songwriting (1–5, 7–9, 12, 13)
- Ed Drewett – background vocals (1); songwriting (1, 5, 13)
- Jamie Scott – background vocals (2, 4, "Home"); guitar (2); all instruments (4, 7, 10, "Home"); songwriting (2, 4, 7, 8, 10, "Home"); production (10, "Home")
- Rick Wilson – background vocals (2, "Home")
- Jesse Shatkin – all instruments, production (3)
- Jacob Kasher – songwriting (3, 5, 11)
- Maureen Anne McDonald – songwriting (3)
- Damon Bunetta – background vocals (5, 13)
- Peter Bunetta – background vocals (5, 13)
- Gamal "LunchMoney" Lewis – songwriting (5)
- Wayne Hector – songwriting (5, 13)
- Johan Carlsson – piano, synths, bass, background vocals, production, engineering, songwriting (6)
- Ross Golan – background vocals, songwriting (6)
- Mattias Bylund – strings, string arrangement, string recording, string editing (6)
- Mattias Johansson – violin (6)
- David Bukovinsky – cello (6)
- Nick Brost – brass (8)
- David Levine – brass (8)
- Sam Johnson – brass (8)
- Willie Murillo – brass (9)
- Danielle Ondarza – brass (9)
- Andrew Martin – brass (9)
- Tom Evans – brass (9)
- Daniel Bryer – background vocals (10, "Home"); all instruments, programming, arrangement, songwriting (10); additional production ("Home")
- Alisha Bauer – cello (12)
- Ammar Malik – songwriting (12)
- Directioners – background vocals (13)
- Joe Ryan – background vocals (13)
- Marco Marinangeli – string arrangement (1, 4, 9); brass arrangement (9)
- Gavin Greenaway – conductor (1, 4, 9)
- Perry Montague–Mason – string leader, violin (1, 4, 9)
- Simon Baggs – violin (1, 4, 9)
- Patrick Kiernan – violin (1, 4, 9)
- Mark Berrow – violin (1, 4, 9)
- Boguslaw Kostecki – violin (1, 4, 9)
- Dai Emanuel – violin (1, 4, 9)
- Magnus Johnston – violin (1, 4, 9)
- Daniel Bhattacharya – violin (1, 4, 9)
- Jackie Hartley – violin (1, 4, 9)
- Warren Zielinski – violin (1, 4, 9)
- Christina Emanuel – violin (1, 4, 9)
- Gaby Lester – violin (1, 4, 9)
- Cathy Thompson – violin (1, 4, 9)
- John Bradbury – violin (1, 4, 9)
- Steve Morris – violin (1, 4, 9)
- Jim McLeod – violin (1, 4, 9)
- Peter Lale – viola (1, 4, 9)
- Rachel Bolt – viola (1, 4, 9)
- Steve Wright – viola (1, 4, 9)
- Martin Humbey – viola (1, 4, 9)
- Ian Burdge – cello (1, 4, 9)
- Tony Woollard – cello (1, 4, 9)
- Chris Worsey – cello (1, 4, 9)
- Caroline Dearnley – cello (1, 4, 9)

Technical personnel

- Ian Frazino – production (4); background vocals (13); assistant engineer (1–5, 7–9, 11–13) (credited with Andrew Haas as AFTERHRS for production)
- Andrew Haas – production (4); background vocals (13); (credited with Ian Frazino as AFTERHRS for production)
- Noah "Mailbox" Passovoy – vocal production (6)
- Mike Needle – vocal production, songwriting (10); background vocals (10, "Home")
- Joe Zook – mixing (1, 4)
- Șerban Ghenea – mixing (2, 3, 5, 6)
- Ash Howes – mixing (7, 10, 11, 13, "Home")
- Mike Guzauski – mixing (8, 12)
- John Hanes – engineer for mix (2, 3, 5, 6)
- Tyler Shields – engineering (6)
- Mo Hausler – engineering and recording (10)
- Joe Kearns – engineering (10)
- Kevin Bayly – assistant engineer (3, 8, 9, 12)
- Jasper Dent – vocal engineering (1, 2, 4, 5, 9, 10)
- Isobel Griffiths – string contractor (1, 4, 9)
- Amy Stewart – assistant string contractor (1, 4, 9)
- Tom Coyne – mastering
- Kate Moross – art director
- Sven Jacobsen – photographer
- Studio Moross – desgin
- Helene Horlyck – Queen of vocals

== Charts ==
=== Weekly charts ===
Chart (2015)	Peak position
Australian Albums (ARIA)	2
Austrian Albums (Ö3 Austria)	2
Belgian Albums (Ultratop Flanders)	1
Belgian Albums (Ultratop Wallonia)	3
Brazilian Albums (ABPD)	4
Canadian Albums (Billboard)	2
Croatian Albums (HDU)	6
Czech Albums (ČNS IFPI)	3
Danish Albums (Hitlisten)	4
Dutch Albums (Album Top 100)	3
Finnish Albums (Suomen virallinen lista)	1
French Albums (SNEP)	4
German Albums (Offizielle Top 100)	2
Greek Albums (IFPI)	1
Hungarian Albums (MAHASZ)	2
Irish Albums (IRMA)	1
Irish Albums (Official Charts)	12
Italian Albums (FIMI)	1
Japanese Albums (Oricon)	3
South Korean Albums (Circle) Deluxe version	24
South Korean International Albums (Circle) Deluxe version	2
Mexican Albums (AMPROFON)	1
New Zealand Albums (RMNZ)	2
Norwegian Albums (VG-lista)	2
Polish Albums (ZPAV)	1
Portuguese Albums (AFP)	1
Scottish Albums (Official Charts)	1
South African Albums (RISA)	5
Spanish Albums (Promusicae)	1
Swedish Albums (Sverigetopplistan)	2
Swiss Albums (Schweizer Hitparade)	1
UK Albums (Official Charts)	1
UK Album Downloads (Official Charts)	2
US Billboard 200	2
US Top Album Sales (Billboard)	2
US Top Catalog Albums (Billboard)	15

=== Monthly charts ===
Chart (2015)	Peak position
Argentine Monthly Albums (CAPIF)	1

=== Year-end charts ===
Chart (2015)	Position
Australian Albums (ARIA)	9
Austrian Albums (Ö3 Austria)	33
Belgian Albums (Ultratop Flanders)	28
Belgian Albums (Ultratop Wallonia)	68
Brazilian Albums Chart	9
Dutch Albums (MegaCharts)	23
German Albums (Offizielle Top 100)	86
Hungarian Albums (MAHASZ)	31
Irish Albums (IRMA)	12
Italian Albums (FIMI)	18
Japanese Albums (Billboard Japan)	37
Mexican Albums (AMPROFON)	3
New Zealand Albums (RMNZ)	22
Spanish Albums (PROMUSICAE)	18
Swedish Albums (Sverigetopplistan)	35
Swiss Albums (Schweizer Hitparade)	71
UK Albums (OCC)	14
Chart (2016)	Position
Australian Albums (ARIA)	87
Belgian Albums (Ultratop Flanders)	113
Canadian Albums (Billboard)	8
Danish Albums (Hitlisten)	44
Dutch Albums (MegaCharts)	66
Mexican Albums (AMPROFON)	44
New Zealand Albums (RMNZ)	40
Spanish Albums (PROMUSICAE)	81
Swedish Albums (Sverigetopplistan)	57
UK Albums (OCC)	51
US Billboard 200	8
Chart (2020)	Position
Belgian Albums (Ultratop Flanders)	85
Chart (2021)	Position
Australian Albums (ARIA)	97
Belgian Albums (Ultratop Flanders)	78
Chart (2022)	Position
Belgian Albums (Ultratop Flanders)	177
Chart (2023)	Position
Belgian Albums (Ultratop Flanders)	177
Chart (2024)	Position
Belgian Albums (Ultratop Flanders)	163

== Certifications ==
Region	Certification	Certified units/sales
Australia (ARIA)	2× Platinum	140,000^{‡}
Austria (IFPI Austria)	Gold	7,500^{*}
Canada (Music Canada)	Platinum	80,000^{^}
Denmark (IFPI Danmark)	3× Platinum	60,000^{‡}
Finland (Musiikkituottajat)	Gold	11,800
France (SNEP)	Gold	50,000^{*}
Germany (BVMI)	Gold	100,000^{‡}
Hungary (MAHASZ)	Gold	1,000^{^}
Italy (FIMI)	2× Platinum	100,000^{‡}
Japan (RIAJ)	Gold	100,000^{^}
Mexico (AMPROFON)	4× Platinum	240,000^{‡}
New Zealand (RMNZ)	3× Platinum	45,000^{‡}
Poland (ZPAV)	3× Platinum	60,000^{‡}
Portugal (AFP)	Gold	7,500^{^}
Spain (Promusicae)	Platinum	40,000^{‡}
Sweden (GLF)	Gold	20,000^{‡}
Switzerland (IFPI Switzerland)	Gold	10,000^{‡}
United Kingdom (BPI)	2× Platinum	600,000^{‡}
United States (RIAA)	2× Platinum	2,000,000^{‡}
^{*} Sales figures based on certification alone.^{^} Shipments figures based on certification alone.^{‡} Sales+streaming figures based on certification alone.

== Release history ==
List of release dates, showing region, formats, label, editions and reference
Region	Date	Format(s)	Label	Edition(s)	Ref.
Worldwide	13 November 2015	CD; digital download; vinyl	Columbia; Syco	Standard; deluxe	
