= Drag Me Down =

Single by One Direction

from the album Made in the A.M.
- Released: 31 July 2015
- Genre: Pop rock
- Length: 3:12
- Label: Syco
- Songwriters: Julian Bunetta; Jamie Scott; John Ryan
- Producer: Julian Bunetta

One Direction singles chronology
"Night Changes" (2014)	"Drag Me Down" (2015)	"Perfect" (2015)

Music video
- "Drag Me Down" on YouTube

"Drag Me Down" is a song recorded by English-Irish boy band One Direction as the lead single for their fifth studio album, Made in the A.M. (2015). The song was released worldwide on 31 July 2015 and was the band's first single since Zayn Malik's departure earlier that same year. "Drag Me Down" debuted atop the charts in the United Kingdom, Ireland, France, Austria, Australia, and New Zealand. It became the group's first number-one single in France and Australia, as well as their fourth number-one in New Zealand and the United Kingdom. It debuted at number three on the Billboard Hot 100 chart and won the fan-voted 'Best Video Award' at the 2016 Brit Awards.

== Background and release ==
"Drag Me Down" marked One Direction's first single since Zayn Malik's departure in March 2015. The announcement of the release, with no previous promotion or marketing, was done by Liam Payne on his Twitter handle, followed by the rest of the members on 31 July 2015.

== Composition ==
'Drag Me Down'
An 18-second sample of "Drag Me Down"'s chorus, with Niall Horan singing the second half and Harry Styles singing a high note on an increasing tempo pop melody and beat.

"Drag Me Down" is a midtempo pop rock track written by Jamie Scott, Julian Bunetta, and John Ryan, who wrote and produced several songs on One Direction's previous two albums Midnight Memories (2013) and Four (2014). According to Los Angeles Times's editor Mikael Wood, the production contains springy guitars that recall The Police or "Rude" by Magic!. The song is written in C minor with a tempo of 138 beats per minute. It was composed in England.

== Critical reception ==
Professional ratings
Review scores
Source	Rating
Billboard	3.5/5 stars
Digital Spy	3.0/5 stars

Jason Lipshutz of Billboard gave the song three and a half out of five stars and stated that the song offers a more "mature sound". He also commented "for those worried that a four-member incarnation of the group can't get the job done, "Drag Me Down" assuages those fears by keeping the overall quality level high" and "the group compensates for Malik's absence by giving each member ample time to shine, and the harmonies admirably resonate on the call-and-response portions of the pre-chorus". Writing for Idolater, Robbie Daw commented that the song "comes across perhaps like the first One Direction song that might appeal to an audience outside of the band's screaming core fan base".

Gaby Hernandez of Rolling Stone described the song as a "pop-rock track shifts the band's sound from the softer folk of their last album, Four, back to the more upbeat, electronic heavy elements of their first two albums". Jamieson Cox of The Verge called the song "a slight departure from the music the band was making with Malik in tow" while commenting that "there's a bit of The Police in the loping, reggae-lite bass line and guitar riffs, and the song's structure is cribbed from the last few years' finest EDM-pop crossovers" and that "when you fold in the melody, the whole package reminds me of Taylor Swift's "I Knew You Were Trouble", and that qualifies as praise in this space". Noelle Devoe, writing for The Daily Telegraph, described the song as "rocking an even edgier, mature sound" and "a love song to their fans" while commenting on Styles' high notes. The Herald wrote that "in true One Direction style, Drag Me Down is a catchy love song with a poppy beat". Lewis Corner of Digital Spy gave the song three out of five stars, and stated that "Drag Me Down" is "one of their most pop-centric releases to date" and that "they may have taken a hit with the exit of Zayn, but One Direction are far from down and out".

Mikael Wood with the Los Angeles Times gave a more negative review, stating that the song is "all too accurately titled" and that it is "decidedly smaller-scaled" and "carries no such charge" compared to the band's previous songs. He added "we're basically talking about a midtempo pop-rock jam with springy guitars that recall The Police" and the song is "more or less what you'd expect from a band of four good-looking white guys".

Past member Zayn Malik took to social media and praised the single, describing it as "sick" and stating that "he was proud of his boys."

== Music video ==
The video for "Drag Me Down" was directed by Ben and Gabe Turner and filmed at NASA's Johnson Space Center in Houston, Texas and premiered on Vevo alongside the song. The video includes the band being put through their paces as though they are astronauts preparing for a space mission. It won the fan-voted 'Best Video Award' at the 2016 Brit Awards and as of 9 May 2022, it has been viewed over 1 billion times on YouTube.

== Remixes ==
In Fall 2015, the Big Payno Remix was released which features American rapper Lunchmoney Lewis which appears on their Perfect EP.

== Live performances ==
One Direction gave their first performance of the song on their On the Road Again Tour in Indianapolis on 31 July 2015 until the end of their concert tour. The song was then performed live as part of a series of free summer concerts in New York City for Good Morning America on 4 August 2015. The band also performed the song on several television programmes including The Ellen DeGeneres Show, The Jonathan Ross Show and Alan Carr: Chatty Man.

== Usage in media ==
An instrumental version of the song is heard in the television series Grey's Anatomy (season 13 episode 8).

The track is present on the soundtrack of the Brazilian soap opera Totalmente Demais (2015).

Song appears in the soundtrack of the video game Madden NFL 19 ("Longshot: Homecoming" only)

A cover of the song by the Finnish-American hard rock band Santa Cruz plays in "Best Friends, For Never", the second episode of the first season of the DC Extended Universe Max series Peacemaker.

== Commercial performance ==
"Drag Me Down" sold 349,000 digital copies in the United States and had 17.7 million streams worldwide in its first week of release. It broke the record on Spotify for most streamed track in one day, earning 4.75 million global streams (it has since been surpassed by Ed Sheeran's "Shape of You" and "Castle on the Hill" both receiving over 6.18 million global streams). The song also debuted at number three on the Billboard Hot 100, the second-highest debut of the year, with 349,000 downloads sold in its first week (making it the group's third number-one hit on the Digital Songs chart and the boy band's best sales week for a song).

Furthermore, the song topped the charts in twelve countries, including Austria, Australia, Czech Republic, France, Greece, Hungary, Ireland, New Zealand, Portugal, Scotland, Slovakia, and the United Kingdom.

== Charts ==
=== Weekly charts ===
Weekly chart performance for "Drag Me Down"
Chart (2015–16)	Peak position
Australia (ARIA)	1
Austria (Ö3 Austria Top 40)	1
Belgium (Ultratop 50 Flanders)	5
Belgium (Ultratop 50 Wallonia)	4
Brazil (Brasil Hot 100)	97
Canada Hot 100 (Billboard)	4
Czech Republic Airplay (ČNS IFPI)	4
Czech Republic Singles Digital (ČNS IFPI)	1
Denmark (Tracklisten)	5
Dominican Republic Anglo (Monitor Latino)	10
Euro Digital Song Sales (Billboard)	1
Finland (Suomen virallinen lista)	3
France (SNEP)	1
Germany (GfK)	10
Greece Digital Songs (Billboard)	1
Hungary (Single Top 40)	1
Hungary (Stream Top 40)	2
Ireland (IRMA)	1
Italy (FIMI)	4
Japan Hot 100 (Billboard)	22
Lebanon (The Official Lebanese Top 20)	5
Luxembourg Digital Song Sales (Billboard)	3
Mexico Anglo (Monitor Latino)	17
Netherlands (Dutch Top 40)	15
Netherlands (Single Top 100)	5
New Zealand (Recorded Music NZ)	1
Norway (VG-lista)	20
Poland Airplay (ZPAV)	5
Portugal (AFP)	36
Scottish Singles Sales (Official Charts)	1
Slovakia Airplay (ČNS IFPI)	18
Slovakia Singles Digital (ČNS IFPI)	1
Slovenia (SloTop50)	36
South Africa Airplay (EMA)	2
South Korea International Chart (GAON)	38
Spain (Promusicae)	2
Sweden (Sverigetopplistan)	6
Switzerland (Schweizer Hitparade)	2
UK Singles (Official Charts)	1
US Billboard Hot 100	3
US Adult Contemporary (Billboard)	26
US Adult Pop Airplay (Billboard)	17
US Dance Airplay (Billboard)	26
US Pop Airplay (Billboard)	6

=== Year-end charts ===
Year-end chart performance for "Drag Me Down"
Chart (2015)	Position
Australia (ARIA)	50
Austria (Ö3 Austria Top 40)	64
Belgium (Ultratop Flanders)	98
Canada (Canadian Hot 100)	52
France (SNEP)	155
Hungary (Single Top 40)	67
Italy (FIMI)	51
Netherlands (Dutch Top 40)	74
Netherlands (Single Top 100)	92
Poland (ZPAV)	41
Sweden (Sverigetopplistan)	70
Switzerland (Schweizer Hitparade)	63
UK Singles (OCC)	48
US Billboard Hot 100	65
US Mainstream Top 40 (Billboard)	42

== Certifications ==
Certifications for "Drag Me Down"
Region	Certification	Certified units/sales
Australia (ARIA)	5× Platinum	350,000^{‡}
Belgium (BRMA)	Gold	10,000^{‡}
Canada (Music Canada)	3× Platinum	240,000^{‡}
Denmark (IFPI Danmark)	2× Platinum	180,000^{‡}
Germany (BVMI)	Gold	200,000^{‡}
Italy (FIMI)	2× Platinum	100,000^{‡}
Mexico (AMPROFON)	3× Platinum+Gold	210,000^{‡}
New Zealand (RMNZ)	3× Platinum	90,000^{‡}
Norway (IFPI Norway)	Platinum	40,000^{‡}
Poland (ZPAV)	4× Platinum	80,000^{‡}
Spain (Promusicae)	Platinum	60,000^{‡}
Sweden (GLF)	Platinum	40,000^{‡}
United Kingdom (BPI)	2× Platinum	1,200,000
United States	—	1,208,000
^{‡} Sales+streaming figures based on certification alone.
