= Perfect (One Direction song) =

Single by One Direction

from the album Made in the A.M.
- Released: 16 October 2015
- Recorded: July 2015
- Length: 3:50
- Label: Syco; Sony
- Songwriters: Harry Styles; Louis Tomlinson; Jesse Shatkin; Jacob Kasher; John Ryan; Maureen Anne McDonald; Julian Bunetta
- Producers: Julian Bunetta; Shatkin; AFTERHRS

One Direction singles chronology
"Drag Me Down" (2015)	"Perfect" (2015)	"History" (2015)

One Direction EP chronology
Live While We’re Young EP (2012)	Perfect (2015)

Music video
- "Perfect" on YouTube

"Perfect" is a song by English-Irish boy band One Direction. Released on 16 October 2015 as the second single from their fifth studio album, Made in the A.M., it debuted at number one in Ireland, and reached the top 10 in several countries, including the United Kingdom, United States, France, New Zealand and Australia. The song was written by members Harry Styles and Louis Tomlinson, along with the band's regular collaborators, Julian Bunetta and John Ryan among others.

== Background and composition ==
In various interviews, the band members and co-writers describe differing aspects of the composition and overall meaning of the song. The song is in D major and has a tempo of 100 beats per minute. Long-time writer and producer for the band, Julian Bunetta described the writing process as "difficult" due to the writing occurring whilst the members travelled from country to country during their 2015 On the Road Again Tour. Bunetta called the single "a jam" and stated that he plays it in his car frequently.

== Critical reception ==
Digital Spy's Lewis Corner praised "Perfect", describing it as a "scintillating slice of '80s pop" and also said that the song was a "delicious retort" to Taylor Swift's (rumoured ex-girlfriend of band member Harry Styles) song "Style". Brittany Spanos of Rolling Stone commented that the song was "a catchy ode to bad boys and the rebellious personas" while noticing that "Styles seems to directly respond to the songs Taylor Swift is rumoured to have written about him on her album 1989.

Former band member Zayn Malik was less complimentary about the song; in his January 2016 cover story interview in Billboard, he said that the first single was "quite cool" but heard the second single and decided not to buy the album.

== Chart performance ==
In the band's native United Kingdom, "Perfect" debuted at number two. In the United States, the song became the band's sixth and final top ten hit when "Perfect" debuted at number 10 on the Billboard issue dated 7 November 2015. This debut also broke The Beatles' record for the most top 10 Hot 100 debuts among bands.

== Music video ==
The music video was directed by Sophie Muller with additional help from actor Giovanni Ribisi and premiered on Vevo on 20 October 2015. The video, filmed in black and white, depicts how the band lives while on tour, and was filmed at the Intercontinental Hotel in Midtown Manhattan, New York City in early September 2015. The video features shots of the members as they relax in a hotel room during their 2015 tour.

== Live performances ==
The group performed "Perfect" for the first time at the 3Arena in Dublin, Ireland on 16 October 2015 during the last leg of their On the Road Again Tour and continued to perform the song in their concerts until their last before their hiatus on 31 October in Sheffield, England. The band also performed "Perfect" at the 2015 American Music Awards, BBC Radio 1's Live Lounge, The Ellen DeGeneres Show, Jimmy Kimmel Live!, British The X Factor as well as Jingle Ball festivals across the United States. In November 2015, the band performed the song in front of Prince Harry, Duke of Sussex at the Royal Variety Performance and Ed Power from The Telegraph listed the performance as "the fifth standout moment of the night."

== Track listing ==
- Digital download
1. "Perfect" – 3:50
- Digital EP
1. "Perfect" (Stripped) – 3:51
2. "Home" – 3:14
3. "Perfect" (Matoma Remix) – 3:43
4. "Drag Me Down" (featuring LunchMoney Lewis) (Big Payno x AFTERHRS Remix) – 3:08

Note: "Home" was written by Jamie Scott, Louis Tomlinson and Liam Payne.

== Charts ==
=== Weekly charts ===
2015–16 weekly chart performance for "Perfect"
Chart (2015–2016)	Peak position
Australia (ARIA)	4
Austria (Ö3 Austria Top 40)	2
Belgium (Ultratop 50 Flanders)	9
Belgium (Ultratop 50 Wallonia)	21
Canada Hot 100 (Billboard)	13
Czech Republic Singles Digital (ČNS IFPI)	3
Czech Republic Airplay (ČNS IFPI)	15
Denmark (Tracklisten)	25
Euro Digital Song Sales (Billboard)	1
Finland (Suomen virallinen lista)	12
France (SNEP)	8
Germany (GfK)	20
Ireland (IRMA)	1
Italy (FIMI)	3
Hungary (Rádiós Top 40)	8
Hungary (Single Top 40)	2
Hungary (Stream Top 40)	8
Japan Hot 100 (Billboard)	24
Mexico Ingles Airplay (Billboard )	10
Netherlands (Dutch Top 40)	31
Netherlands (Single Top 100)	28
New Zealand (Recorded Music NZ)	7
Norway (VG-lista)	15
Poland Airplay (ZPAV)	11
Portugal (AFP)	28
Scottish Singles Sales (Official Charts)	1
Slovakia Singles Digital (ČNS IFPI)	1
South Africa Airplay (EMA)	5
Spain (Promusicae)	11
Sweden (Sverigetopplistan)	12
Switzerland (Schweizer Hitparade)	12
UK Singles (Official Charts)	2
US Billboard Hot 100	10
US Adult Pop Airplay (Billboard)	22
US Pop Airplay (Billboard)	10

2024 weekly chart performance for "Perfect"
Chart (2024)	Peak position
Global 200 (Billboard)	94
Philippines (Philippines Hot 100)	26

=== Year-end charts ===
Year-end chart performance for "Perfect"
Chart (2015)	Position
Australia (ARIA)	91
Taiwan (Hito Radio)	64
UK Singles (OCC)	92

Chart (2016)	Position
Brazil (Brasil Hot 100)	20
Canada (Canadian Hot 100)	61
Hungary (Rádiós Top 40)	42
US Billboard Hot 100	100

== Certifications ==
Certifications and sales for "Perfect"
Region	Certification	Certified units/sales
Australia (ARIA)	3× Platinum	210,000^{‡}
Canada (Music Canada)	2× Platinum	160,000^{‡}
Denmark (IFPI Danmark)	Platinum	90,000^{‡}
Germany (BVMI)	Gold	200,000^{‡}
Italy (FIMI)	Platinum	50,000^{‡}
Mexico (AMPROFON)	2× Platinum+Gold	150,000^{‡}
New Zealand (RMNZ)	3× Platinum	90,000^{‡}
Spain (Promusicae)	Gold	30,000^{‡}
United Kingdom (BPI)	Platinum	600,000^{‡}
United States	—	817,000
^{‡} Sales+streaming figures based on certification alone.

== Release history ==
List of release dates, showing region, formats, label and reference
Region	Date	Format(s)	Label	Ref.
Worldwide	October 16, 2015	[CD]	Columbia; Syco	
