= History (One Direction song) =

Single by One Direction

from the album Made in the A.M.
- Released: 6 November 2015
- Length: 3:15
- Label: Syco; Sony
- Songwriters: Liam Payne; Louis Tomlinson; John Ryan; Julian Bunetta; Ed Drewett; Wayne Hector
- Producers: Julian Bunetta; John Ryan

One Direction singles chronology
"Perfect" (2015)	"History" (2015)

Music video
- "History" on YouTube

"History" is a song by English-Irish boy band One Direction. It was written by Wayne Hector, Ed Drewett, Julian Bunetta, and John Ryan along with band members Liam Payne and Louis Tomlinson. The song was released on 6 November 2015 as the third and final single from their fifth and final studio album Made in the A.M. (2015). It was also the final single released by the band. "History" peaked at number six on the UK Singles Chart.

== Composition ==
"History" was written by members Liam Payne and Louis Tomlinson, along with Wayne Hector, Ed Drewett and the band's regular collaborators Julian Bunetta and John Ryan. It is a jaunty acoustic singalong and was composed in G-flat major with a tempo of 88 beats per minute and a time signature of 12/8. "History" closes Made in the A.M.'s standard edition.

== Release ==
The song was chosen as the third and final single from Made in the A.M. after the commercial success that followed the band's performance on the finale of series 12 of The X Factor.

"History" was released by Syco Music on 6 November 2015.

== Music video ==
The music video, directed by Ben Winston, was released on the band's Vevo channel, via YouTube, on 26 January 2016. It features clips of the band throughout the years, highlighting their tours and personal anecdotes and including clips of former member Zayn Malik, intercut with the band singing in front of a brick wall. The video ends as the band walks off in separate directions; it was later confirmed that the band was originally supposed to run back together. Director Winston said, "The ending wasn't supposed to look like they're just walking off in different directions, it was kind of like a 'see you in a bit, guys'."

== Critical reception ==
Madeline Roth of MTV News commented, "littered with hand claps and campfire singalong vibes, "History" is both nostalgic and forward-looking at the same time" and that the song is "the perfect goodbye to their fans". Brennan Carley, writing with Spin, wrote that "utilizing hand claps, acoustic guitar, and Harry Styles' sweet, standout harmonizing, the song's proof that each of the remaining four 1D singers will be just fine on their own". Brittany Spanos of Rolling Stone wrote that the group went "rootsy" with the song, while adding that "the quartet harmonize above acoustic guitars and hand claps" and that "the boy band's latest veers sharply from the more anthemic, arena rock sounds of their most recent singles". Lucy Wang, writing for Time, called the song a "crooning, bittersweet anthem" and "a celebration of the British boy band’s five-year journey alongside its fans".

== Charts ==
=== Weekly charts ===
Weekly chart performance for "History"
Chart (2015–16)	Peak position
Australia (ARIA)	25
Austria (Ö3 Austria Top 40)	17
Belgium (Ultratop 50 Flanders)	44
Belgium (Ultratip Bubbling Under Wallonia)	13
Canada Hot 100 (Billboard)	46
Euro Digital Song Sales (Billboard)	6
France (SNEP)	54
Germany (GfK)	77
Hungary (Single Top 40)	19
Hungary (Stream Top 40)	22
Ireland (IRMA)	8
Italy (FIMI)	7
Mexico Ingles Airplay (Billboard)	41
Netherlands (Single Top 100)	72
New Zealand (Recorded Music NZ)	14
Portugal (AFP)	88
Scottish Singles Sales (Official Charts)	3
South Korea International Chart (GAON)	64
Spain (Promusicae)	31
Sweden (Sverigetopplistan)	63
Switzerland (Schweizer Hitparade)	52
UK Singles (Official Charts)	6
US Billboard Hot 100	65
US Pop Airplay (Billboard)	33
Venezuela Top Anglo (Record Report)	21

=== Year-end charts ===
Year-end chart performance for "History"
Chart (2016)	Position
Iceland (Plötutíóindi)	26
UK Singles (OCC)	45

== Certifications ==
Certifications for "History"
Region	Certification	Certified units/sales
Australia (ARIA)	2× Platinum	140,000^{‡}
Canada (Music Canada)	Gold	40,000^{‡}
Denmark (IFPI Danmark)	Gold	45,000^{‡}
Italy (FIMI)	Gold	25,000^{‡}
Mexico (AMPROFON)	Platinum	60,000^{‡}
New Zealand (RMNZ)	3× Platinum	90,000^{‡}
Poland (ZPAV)	Gold	25,000^{‡}
Spain (Promusicae)	Gold	30,000^{‡}
United Kingdom (BPI)	2× Platinum	1,300,000
^{‡} Sales+streaming figures based on certification alone.
