= Take Me Home (One Direction album) =

Studio album by One Direction
- Released: 9 November 2012
- Recorded: May–August 2012
- Studios: Kinglet Studios (Stockholm); Chalice Studios (Los Angeles); MixStar Studios (Virginia Beach, Virginia); Sticky Studios (Surrey, England)
- Genres: Pop; teen pop; pop rock
- Length: 42:19
- Labels: Columbia; Syco
- Producers: Julian Bunetta; Cirkut; Dr. Luke; Carl Falk; Kristoffer Fogelmark; Jake Gosling; Steve Robson; Shellback; Rami Yacoub

One Direction chronology
iTunes Festival: London 2012 (2012)	Take Me Home (2012)	Midnight Memories (2013)

Singles from Take Me Home
- 1. "Live While We're Young" Released: 28 September 2012; 2. "Little Things" Released: 12 November 2012; 3. "Kiss You" Released: 7 January 2013

Take Me Home is the second studio album by English-Irish boy band One Direction, released on November 9, 2012, by Syco Music and Columbia Records. As a follow-up to One Direction's internationally successful debut album Up All Night (2011), Take Me Home was written in groups and has an average of just under five songwriters per track. Largely recorded and composed in Sweden during 2012, Savan Kotecha, Rami Yacoub and Carl Falk, who composed One Direction's hits, "What Makes You Beautiful" and "One Thing", spent six months in Stockholm developing songs for the album, and were able to shape melodies around the members' tones.

The album's songs are characterised by metronomic pop, vocal harmonies, hand claps, prominent electric guitar riffs, bright synthesizers, a homogeneous sound and message, and rotations of lead vocals. The members' voices are presented individually on the record, and its lyricism speaks of falling in love, unrequited love, commitment, jealousy and self-empowerment. Take Me Home garnered mostly positive reviews from music critics. There was praise for its quality of production, while criticism hinged on its generic, rushed nature.

Globally, the album topped the charts in more than 35 countries. According to the International Federation of the Phonographic Industry (IFPI), Take Me Home was the fourth-global-best-selling album of 2012, selling 4.4 million units. The album's number-one debut on the US Billboard 200 chart made One Direction the first group to bow atop the Billboard 200 with their first two albums since American girl group Danity Kane entered with Welcome to the Dollhouse in 2008 and their self-titled debut in 2006. One Direction also became the second act in 2012 to achieve two number-one albums within a 12-month period, and the first boy band in US chart history to land two number-one albums in a calendar year. Their debut album and Take Me Home were the third and fifth-best-selling albums of 2012 in the United States, respectively, making the band the first act to place two albums in the year-end top five in the Nielsen SoundScan era.

The album's lead single, "Live While We're Young", released on 28 September 2012, peaked inside the top ten in almost every country it charted in and recorded the highest one-week opening sales figure for a song by a non-U.S. artist. The subsequent singles, "Little Things" and "Kiss You", were less successful, although the former topped the UK Singles Chart. To promote the album, One Direction performed the album's songs on several televised programmes and a headlining sold-out concert at the Madison Square Garden. Furthermore, One Direction embarked on their second worldwide concert tour entitled the Take Me Home Tour in 2013.

== Background and production ==
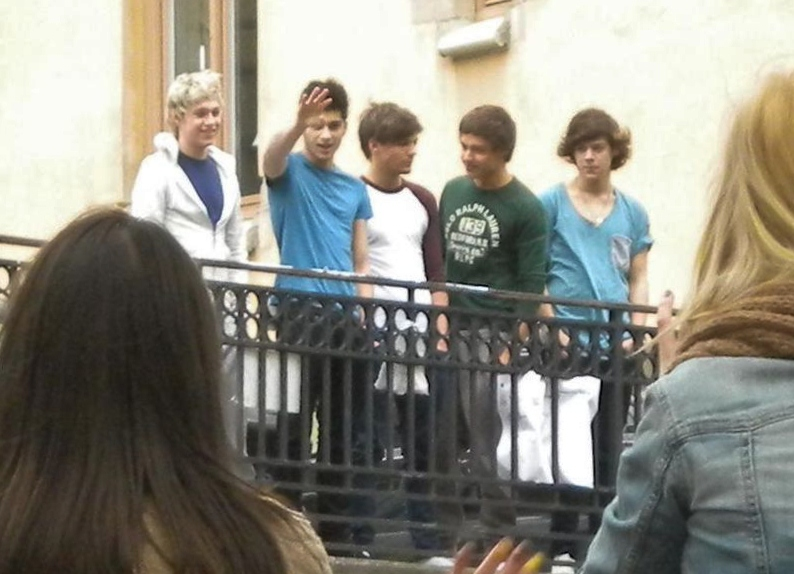
One Direction greet Swedish fans in Stockholm, Sweden, May 2012, as the recording commenced at Kinglet Studios

In 2012, One Direction revealed that a follow-up release to their debut album, Up All Night (2011), was in development. "In the summer, we're going to get back and start a new record. We want to bring out a record nearly every year, every year and a half," Niall Horan said, revealing they were arranging "meetings and stuff with different writers and producers." In March 2012, McFly frontman Tom Fletcher confirmed that he would be writing a song for the album. In February 2012, One Direction expressed interest in working with Ed Sheeran, and in June 2012, Sheeran confirmed that they were in contact: "I'm going into the studio in August to produce the tracks for them. I won't feature on the tracks though".

In April 2012, The Independent reported that Simon Cowell, the group's manager, had challenged prominent songwriters to compete for space on One Direction's second album. Dee Demirbag, responsible for repertoire at BMG Rights Management, a music publisher, in Scandinavia, said: "Breaking a boy band in the U.S. is about as big as it gets in the music industry, so you can imagine the competition to get cuts on the next One Direction album is immense". In addition, the article reported that Syco Records was working on candidates with Max Martin and Kristian Lundin. By August 2012, it was confirmed that album would feature work from veterans such as Carl Falk, Rami Yacoub, Dr. Luke, Cirkut, and Shellback.

Take Me Home was written in groups and has an average of just under five songwriters per track. "The Swedish-style songwriting: melody first" was predominantly utilised, according to Time correspondent Douglas Wolk. Savan Kotecha, Yacoub, and Falk, who composed One Direction's hits, "What Makes You Beautiful" and "One Thing", spent six months in Stockholm, Sweden, developing songs for the album, and were able to shape melodies around their tones. Kotecha reflected: "We'll spend days, sometimes weeks, challenging the melody. The goal is to make it sound like anyone can do this, but it's actually very difficult". In addition, after viewing the international success of "What Makes You Beautiful", the trio conceptualised songs "that kids could play on guitar and cover on YouTube."

After extensive promotional appearances in support of their debut album, One Direction began recording the album in May 2012, in Stockholm, Sweden, at Kinglet Studios. In June 2012, the group continued recording the album in the United States, while touring on the final leg of their Up All Night Tour. Horan, in a June interview with MTV News, disclosed that the group were intending to spend their time in July and August "getting the album done." Besides sessions in Kinglet Studios, recording sessions and mixing for the album took place at Chalice Studios in Los Angeles, MixStar Studios in Virginia Beach, Wendy House Productions in London, and Sticky Studios in Surrey, England.

== Packaging ==
The album cover artwork, revealed on 30 August 2012, features the group surrounding a traditional British K6 red telephone box, a familiar sight on the streets of the UK. It was photographed at the Fawley Hill railway museum in Buckinghamshire. The phone booth is on display at the Hard Rock Cafe in Piccadilly Circus London.

== Music and lyrics ==
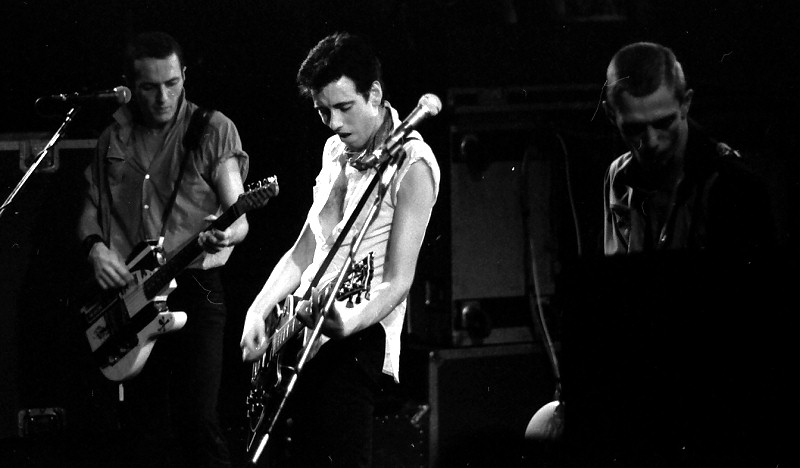
The opening guitar riff of "Live While We're Young" was compared by some critics to that of the Clash's (pictured) 1982 single, "Should I Stay or Should I Go".

The album's songs are characterised by metronomic rock-inherited pop, vocal harmonies, hand claps, prominent electric guitar riffs, bright synthesisers, double entendres for sexual intercourse, a homogeneous sound and message, the pitch-correcting software Auto-Tune, and rotations of lead vocals. Jon Caramanica, writing in The New York Times, considered the album "far more mechanical" than their debut album, although noted that it is sonically and lyrically similar. San Lansky, an editor for Idolator, described it as "'80s-inflected and intermittently rock-dappled", and as more indebted to the "sanitized punk crunch of McFly" than to teen pop.

Alexis Petridis, a music journalist, interpreted its signature sound as a "peppy, synth-bolstered take on early-80s new-wave pop, heavy on clipped rhythms and chugging guitars," which, he said, is at least an improvement on the substitute R&B "that was once the grim lot of the boyband." The opening guitar riff of "Live While We're Young" has been noted as similar to that of the Clash's 1982 single, "Should I Stay or Should I Go", by some critics. According to Petridis, the guitar is played thrice between the riff with the plectrum stroking the strings, while it is pressed. One note in the chord is changed, which Petridis surmised was probably to avoid paying any royalty to the Clash. "Rock Me" has a clapping, mid-tempo beat that has been likened to that "We Will Rock You", a 1977 single by Queen.

The group's voices are presented individually on the record. Savan Kotecha noted that the Backstreet Boys' late-'90s hits inspired the way he formulated One Direction's voices for the album. Composer Julian Bunetta, who worked on three of Take Me Home's tracks, also tried to place emphasis on the sound of each member: "The fans can tell the difference, but we wanted to make sure that when it came on the radio, the average person knew that it must be One Direction, because it's five guys." Likewise, Caramanica noted that the album's songs produced by Bunetta "tend to start out with more breathing room, giving the guys a chance to show off vocally". The album's lyricism speaks of falling in love, unrequited love, the insistence that flaws are what make a person unique, and commitment, in songs such as "Little Things", "Last First Kiss", "Back For You", and "They Don't Know About Us". Other tracks, like "Heart Attack", "Rock Me", "I Would", and "Over Again", have a more solemn tone, addressing jealousy and longing for past significant others.

== Promotion ==
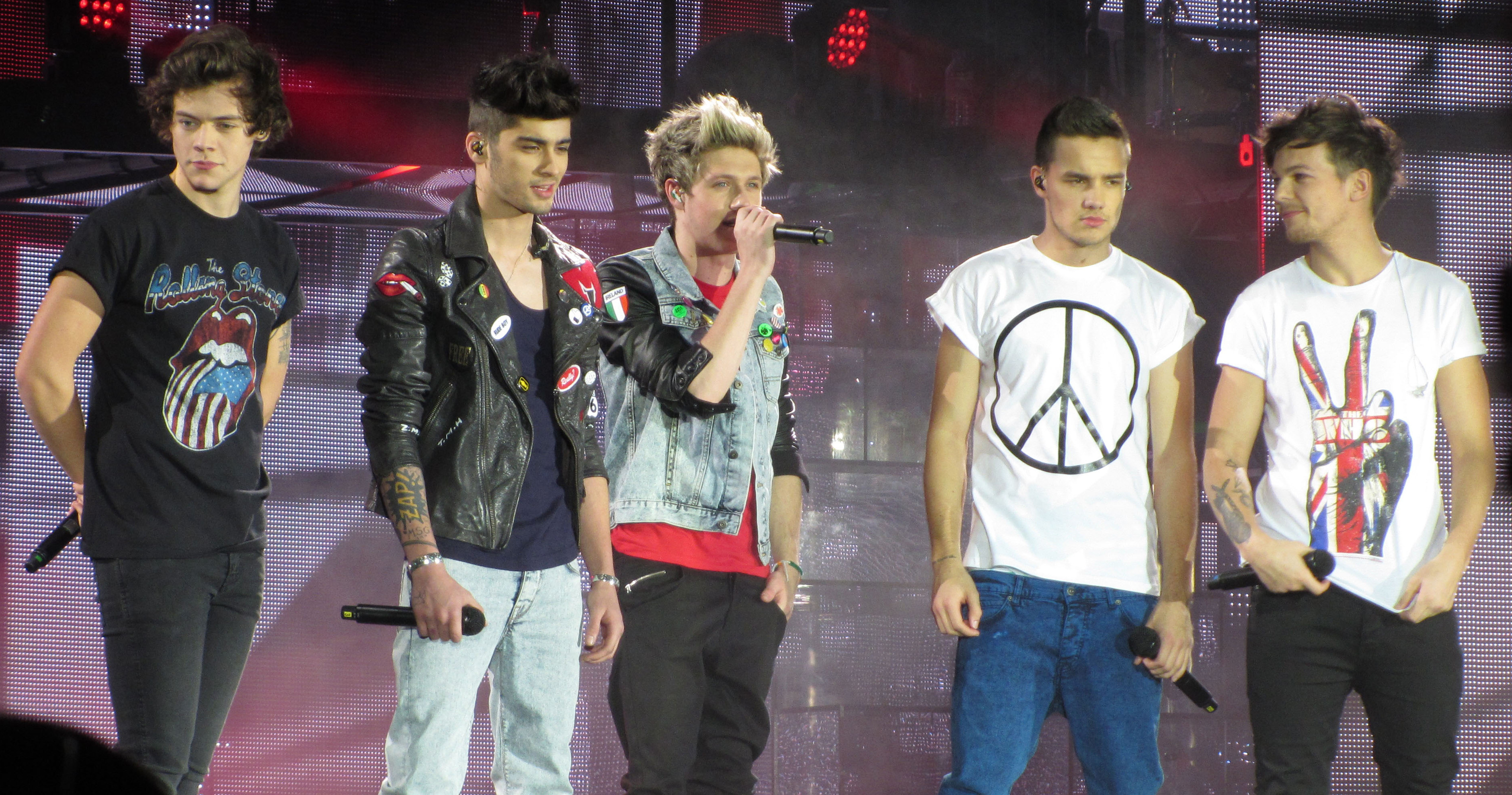
One Direction performing in Glasgow during the album's accompanying concert tour, February 2013

Take Me Home has yielded three singles, including two US singles. Its lead single, "Live While We're Young", was released by Syco Records on 28 September 2012. The song rocketed to worldwide success, peaking at number one in Ireland and New Zealand and the top ten in almost every country it charted in. In the United States, "Live While We're Young" debuted at number three on the Billboard Hot 100 chart, sold 341,000 downloads in its first week, and bowed at number one on the Digital Songs chart. Its debut marks the highest bow by a British group and the second-highest debut among all UK acts, outpaced only by Elton John's number one arrival with "Candle in the Wind 1997". Its opening sales denote the biggest opening sales figure for a single by a non-US artist and the third ever for a download by a group, surpassed by the arrivals of Maroon 5's 2012 single, "Payphone" (493,000), and The Black Eyed Peas' 2009 single, "Boom Boom Pow" (465,000). "Little Things" was released in the UK and Ireland on 12 November 2012, as the second single. The track debuted at number one on the UK Singles Chart of 18 November 2012, becoming One Direction's fifth top-ten appearance and second number-one hit in the United Kingdom. "Kiss You", chosen as the second and final U.S. single third and final overall single of Take Me Home, was released digitally on 17 November 2012, according to MTV News.

The group and the album's lead single were featured in a Pepsi television commercial for the United States, which premiered on the Fox Broadcasting Company network on 10 October 2012. Columbia Records allowed the record to stream in full on iTunes in the week leading up to its 13 November 2012 release. In addition, One Direction promoted the album in a series of live appearances from October toward December, notably on television programmes The X Factor USA, The X Factor UK, The Today Show, and the BBC's Children in Need 2012 telethon. Additional live appearances include at the Royal Variety Performance, in the presence of Queen Elizabeth II, the Bambi Awards, and a headlining sold-out show at New York City's Madison Square Garden. The album's accompanying concert tour, the Take Me Home Tour, commenced at London's O2 Arena on 23 February 2013. The concert tour consists of over 100 shows in Australasia, Europe, and North America, and is set to visit arenas and stadiums from February through October 2013. Announced by member Liam Payne at the 2012 BRIT Awards in early 2012, the original concert tour was billed as the UK & Ireland Arena Tour. In mid-2012, the concert tour expanded with legs in North America and Australasia following the band's international breakthrough. In the UK and Ireland, ticket sales reached 300,000 within a day of release, which included a six-date sell out at the O2 Arena in London. In Australian and New Zealand markets, tickets grossed US$15.7 million, with all 190,000 tickets being sold for eighteen shows to be held in Australia and New Zealand.

== Critical reception ==
Professional ratings
Aggregate scores
Source	Rating
Metacritic	68/100
Review scores
Source	Rating
AllMusic	4/5 stars
Billboard	80/100
Daily Express	3/5 stars
Entertainment Weekly	C
The Guardian	3/5 stars
The Independent	4/5 stars
PopMatters	6/10
Rolling Stone	3/5 stars

The album received generally positive reviews from contemporary music critics. At Metacritic, which assigns a normalised rating out of 100 to reviews from mainstream critics, the album received an average score of 68, based on ten reviews. Despite its "boardroom-defined objectives" and "safety", Al Fox, writing for BBC Music, considered the music itself "notable quality" and reliable. Matt Collar from AllMusic described it as an "immediately catchy mix of dancey pop that maximizes the group's shared lead-vocal approach and peppy, upbeat image." Kate Wills from The Independent praised the uptempo material while defining the ballads as jarring, a notion shared by John Dolan of Rolling Stone. Simon Gage of Daily Express noted that "it's not going to change the world" but "the voices are good and the charm undiminished". Chris Richards of The Washington Post wrote that "the group's best songs are dazzlingly efficient" and "the boy band's sophomore album is pop candy in the purest sense—sweet, colorful, and unlike so many releases aimed at ticklish tweenage hearts, consistent". Sam Lansky of Idolator commented that the album is "some of the purest pop of the year" and "is actually pretty great—certainly better than it needs to be" while adding that "the hooks are instantaneous and keenly crafted" and "the production is '80s-inflected and intermittently rock-dappled".

Al Fox of BBC Music complimented the album, writing "polished and dependable, despite its safety there are some show-stopping pop anthems present" while adding that the album "takes the One Direction brand, reinforces it nicely, and as far as their fans' needs are concerned, ticks every single box". Josh Langhoff of PopMatters praised "C'mon C'mon" as the album's best song, calling it "amazing" and "euphoric" and complimenting the group's harmonies while also adding that the album had "unexpected variety" and that "these may be the least articulate cads on the pop charts, but their beats speak volumes". James Robertson of The Daily Mirror praised the album, writing that "it's fun, infectious and they've found the balance between poptastic fun for the pre-teens and lyrics with meaning for embarrassed twenty-somethings who secretly listen to Up All Night on their iPods" and that "there are some obvious rhymes and repetitive tones but the five-piece have smashed it with Take Me Home". Carmin Chappell of HuffPost commented that "their maturation into young adults is made evident" and that "although the songs still have the poppy vibe characteristic of boybands, this album has a more cohesive sound than the last" while complimenting the album for how it "successfully embodies the carefree and fun nature of teens". Sarah Dean, also writing for HuffPost, deemed the album as "disappointingly good pop" and "the kind of music you want to hate and know you shouldn't enjoy as someone who isn't a 'teeny-bopper', but it still puts a smile on your face" while ending her review by saying "One Direction's global music domination won't be ending anytime soon. And this album has made me think it's probably just easier to give in and enjoy it".

Some reviews were less positive, with Entertainment Weekly writer Adam Markovitz panning the record as an empty gesture and asserting that the album was rushed, signifying an album with "barely enough zip to keep the kids up past dinner." Likewise, Robert Copsey from Digital Spy wrote, "The result [of Take Me Home] may see them progressing at a snail's pace, but when you've got it so good, what's the rush anyway?" In a mixed review, The New York Times contributor Jon Caramanica appreciated the album's sonic palette, but dismissed its lyricism as narrow and tedious, and Sheeran's contributions as "unusually lumpy in the hands of such a polished group". Caramanica characterised the members' vocals as "fundamentally interchangeable", and opined that only Zayn Malik "breaks free from the pack vocally with any regularity."

While he commended the album for its "variable quality", Alexis Petridis for The Guardian felt the record would not be able to transcend its target market, a core audience aged approximately 8 to 12 and female: "To anyone else, the mystery of One Direction's success—or at least the sheer scale of it—remains as opaque as ever." The latter view was shared by Ben Rayner of the Toronto Star: "Unless you're in the target demographic or are, perhaps, a mom who lived through the same thing in her youth, there's no point in even going near this record, of course, but the rest of us were never meant to in the first place." Writing for HitFix, Melinda Newman maintained that the album "masterfully hits its target", and concluded as follows: "I'm so far out of the One Dimension demographic, I practically need a GPS to find it." Kyle Kramer of Chicago Tribune called the album "a bit of a cash grab" and "an empty gesture" while stating "that almost every song" on the album "appears carefully engineered to stick to a three-minute run time and the same strict structural formula, in which two verses crescendo into forgettable choruses".

== Commercial performance ==
Globally, Take Me Home topped the charts in more than 35 countries, and was the fifth-best-selling album of 2012, selling 4.4 million units. In the United Kingdom, the album sold over 94,000 copies in its first two days of sale. It debuted atop the UK Albums Chart with first-week sales of 155,000 copies, becoming their first album to top the chart and the second fastest selling album of 2012. The album and its second single, "Little Things", both debuted simultaneously at number one in the UK on 18 November 2012, making One Direction the youngest act in British chart history to achieve the feat. The album became the fifth-best-selling album of 2012 in the UK, having sold 616,000 copies by the end of 2012. It was certified quadruple platinum by the British Phonographic Industry (BPI) in 2022, denoting sales of 1,200,000 equivalent units. As of February 2016, the album has sold 1,000,924 copies in the UK.

In Ireland, Take Me Home became the fastest-selling album of 2012, lodged six consecutive weeks atop the Irish Albums Chart, and was certified triple platinum by the Irish Recorded Music Association (IRMA). In Italy, the collection became their second Italian chart-topper, and Italy's seventh-best-selling album of 2012. It has been certified double platinum by the Federation of the Italian Music Industry (FIMI), indicating sales of 60,000 copies. In the Netherlands, the album debuted at number one on 17 November 2012, and shipped 25,000 copies in its first day of release. It was certified platinum by 18 December 2012, denoting shipments of 50,000 copies in the region. After a month of its release, it was certified platinum in Poland for shipments of 30,000 copies, while it became the seventh-best-selling album of 2012 in Denmark, having sold 28,875 copies by year end in that country. In Sweden, the album was the ninth-best-selling album of 2012, and has been certified platinum by the Swedish Recording Industry Association (GLF), signifying shipments of 40,000 units.

The album debuted at number one on the Australian ARIA Chart dated 25 November 2012, a position it held for a second week. It was certified platinum in Australia in its first week by the Australian Recording Industry Association (ARIA) and has since been certified double platinum for a shipment of 140,000 copies.

The record became the band's second number-one album in the United States in the week of 18 November 2012, and recorded the biggest first-week sales tally for an album by a boy band since N'Sync's Celebrity (2001), and the third-largest debut sales week of 2012, behind Taylor Swift's Red and Babel by Mumford & Sons, with 540,000 copies sold. One Direction became the first group to bow atop the Billboard 200 with their first two albums since American girl group Danity Kane entered with Welcome to the Dollhouse in 2008 and their self-titled debut in 2006, the second act in 2012 to achieve two number-one albums within a 12-month period alongside Justin Bieber, and the first boy band in US chart history to land two number-one albums in a calendar year. The album was certified platinum by the Recording Industry Association of America (RIAA) on 5 December 2012, denoting shipments of one million copies. It became their second album in 2012 to top the one-million mark in US sales in the week of 16 December 2012, making them the first act to achieve the feat in a calendar year since 2009, and the first group or duo to achieve the feat since Rascal Flatts in 2007. Their debut album and Take Me Home were the third- and fifth-best-selling albums of 2012 in the United States, respectively, making the band the first act to place two albums in the year-end top five in the Nielsen SoundScan era. On 29 March 2015, it surpassed the 2 million threshold becoming their second album (after Up All Night) to sell over 2 million copies in the U.S. As of August 2015, the album has sold 2.02 million copies in the U.S.

== Track listing ==
Standard edition
No.	Title	Writer(s)	Producer(s)	Length
1.	"Live While We're Young"	Rami Yacoub; Carl Falk; Savan Kotecha	Yacoub; Falk	3:20
2.	"Kiss You"	Yacoub; Falk; Kotecha; Shellback; Kristian Lundin; Kristoffer Fogelmark; Albin Nedler	Yacoub; Falk	3:03
3.	"Little Things"	Ed Sheeran; Fiona Bevan	Jake Gosling	3:39
4.	"C'mon, C'mon"	Julian Bunetta; Jamie Scott; John Ryan	Bunetta; Ryan^{[a]}	2:46
5.	"Last First Kiss"	Yacoub; Falk; Kotecha; Fogelmark; Nedler; Liam Payne; Louis Tomlinson; Zayn Malik	Yacoub; Falk; Fogelmark; Nedler	3:24
6.	"Heart Attack"	Yacoub; Falk; Kotecha; Shellback; Lundin	Yacoub; Falk; Shellback	2:57
7.	"Rock Me"	Allan Grigg; Sam Hollander; Peter Svensson; Lukasz Gottwald; Henry Walter	Dr. Luke; Kool Kojak; Cirkut; Emily Wright^{[b]}	3:21
8.	"Change My Mind"	Yacoub; Falk; Kotecha	Yacoub; Falk	3:33
9.	"I Would"	Tom Fletcher; Danny Jones; Dougie Poynter	Bunetta; Ryan^{[a]}; Sam Waters^{[b]}	3:22
10.	"Over Again"	Sheeran; Robert Conlon; Alexander Gowers	Gosling	3:03
11.	"Back for You"	Yacoub; Falk; Kotecha; Fogelmark; Nedler; Harry Styles; Niall Horan; Payne; Tomlinson	Yacoub; Falk; Fogelmark; Nedler	3:00
12.	"They Don't Know About Us"	Peter Wallevik; Tebey Ottoh; Tommy Gregersen; Tommy Lee James	Bunetta; Ryan^{[a]}; Ottoh^{[b]}	3:21
13.	"Summer Love"	Steve Robson; Wayne Hector; Lindy Robbins; Payne; Tomlinson; Malik; Styles; Horan	Steve Robson	3:29
Total length:				42:12

Yearbook edition bonus tracks
No.	Title	Writer(s)	Producer(s)	Length
14.	"She's Not Afraid"	Bunetta; Scott; Ryan; Tim Wood	Bunetta; Ryan^{[a]}	3:12
15.	"Loved You First"	Bunetta; Ryan; Ottoh; James; Wood	Bunetta; Ryan^{[a]}	3:05
16.	"Nobody Compares"	Yacoub; Falk; Kotecha; Shellback	Yacoub; Falk; Shellback	3:33
17.	"Still the One"	Yacoub; Falk; Kotecha; Payne; Tomlinson; Styles	Yacoub; Falk; Svensson^{[c]}	3:03

Japanese yearbook edition and 2022 digital expanded edition bonus tracks
No.	Title	Writer(s)	Producer(s)	Length
18.	"Truly Madly Deeply"	Trevor Dahl; Toby Gad; Robbins	Gad	3:01
19.	"Magic"	Yacoub; Falk; Kotecha	Yacoub; Carl Falk; Shellback	3:05
20.	"Irresistible"	Fletcher; Jones; Poynter; Horan; Malik; Payne; Styles; Tomlinson	Bunetta; Waters	3:59
Total length:				64:00

Notes

- ^{^[a]} signifies a co-producer
- ^{^[b]} signifies a vocal producer
- ^{^[c]} signifies an additional producer
- Tracks 18, 19 and 20 are featured on the North American Target edition as tracks 14, 15 and 16, alongside live versions of "One Thing" (3:26) and "I Wish" (3:48) as tracks 17 and 18.
- The iTunes Store edition features the yearbook edition tracks (14–17), alongside live versions of "One Thing" (4:01), "What Makes You Beautiful" (3:50), and "Moments" (5:10) as tracks 18, 19 and 20, and a backstage video at the 2012 iTunes Festival as track 21.
- The Japanese iTunes Store special deluxe edition features all 20 tracks from Japanese yearbook edition, as well as "Live While We're Young" (Dave Audé remix; 3:16) and "Kiss You" (Sharoque remix; 4:23) as tracks 21 and 22.

== Personnel ==
Adapted from AllMusic.

- Karl Brazil – drums
- David Bukovinszky – cello
- Julian Bunetta – engineer, musician, producer, vocal producer
- Mattias Bylund – editing, string arrangements, string engineer
- Cirkut – musician, producer, programming
- Rupert Coulson – engineer
- Tom Coyne – mastering
- Tommy Culm – background vocals
- Dr. Luke – musician, producer, programming
- Chris Elliot – string engineer
- Levon Eriksson – assistant
- Carl Falk – guitar, musician, producer, programming, vocal editing, vocal engineer, background vocals
- Rachael Findlen – assistant
- Kristoffer Fogelmark – guitar, musician, producer, programming, vocal editing, vocal engineer, background vocals
- Ian Franzino – assistant engineer
- Serban Ghenea – mixing
- Clint Gibbs – assistant, vocals
- Jake Gosling – drums, mixing, percussion, piano, producer, programming, strings
- Lukasz Gottwald – vocals
- Stephen P. Grigg – assistant
- John Hanes – mixing engineer
- Sam Hollander – musician, programming
- Niall Horan – guitar
- Ash Howes – mixing, programming
- Andy Hughes – assistant
- Ava James – vocals
- Matthias Johansson – violin
- Koool Kojak – engineer, musician, producer, programming, vocals
- Savan Kotecha – background vocals
- Chris Leonard – acoustic guitar, bass guitar, electric guitar
- Zayn Malik – illustrations
- Sam Miller – engineer
- Katie Mitzell – production coordination
- Malcolm Moore – bass
- Adam Nedler – background vocals
- Albin Nedler – musician, producer, programming, vocal editing, vocal engineer
- One Direction – primary artist
- Alex Oriet – vocal engineer
- Tebey Ottoh – vocal producer
- Joel Peters – assistant
- Luke Potashnik – guitar
- Irene Richter – production coordination
- Steve Robson – guitar, keyboards, mixing, producer
- Shellback – bass, musician, producer, programming, background vocals
- Peter Svensson – musician, programming, vocals
- John Urbano – photography
- Henry Walter – vocals
- Sam Waters – vocal engineer, vocal producer
- Caroline Watson – stylist
- Emily Wright – engineer, vocal producer, vocals

== Charts ==
=== Weekly charts ===
Chart (2012)	Peak position
Australian Albums (ARIA)	1
Austrian Albums (Ö3 Austria)	2
Belgian Albums (Ultratop Flanders)	1
Belgian Albums (Ultratop Wallonia)	3
Brazilian Albums (ABPD)	2
Canadian Albums (Billboard)	1
Czech Albums (ČNS IFPI)	1
Danish Albums (Hitlisten)	1
Dutch Albums (Album Top 100)	1
Finnish Albums (Suomen virallinen lista)	2
French Albums (SNEP)	3
German Albums (Offizielle Top 100)	2
Greek Albums (IFPI)	1
Hungarian Albums (MAHASZ)	2
Irish Albums (IRMA)	1
Italian Albums (FIMI)	1
Japanese Albums (Oricon)	2
New Zealand Albums (RMNZ)	1
Norwegian Albums (VG-lista)	1
Polish Albums (OLiS)	3
Portuguese Albums (AFP)	1
Scottish Albums (Official Charts)	1
South African Albums (RISA)	4
South Korean Albums (Circle)	14
South Korean International Albums (Circle)	2
Spanish Albums (Promusicae)	3
Swedish Albums (Sverigetopplistan)	1
Swiss Albums (Schweizer Hitparade)	1
UK Albums (Official Charts)	1
US Billboard 200	1

=== Year-end charts ===
Chart (2012)	Position
Argentinian Albums (CAPIF)	2
Australian Albums (ARIA)	8
Austrian Albums (Ö3 Austria)	72
Belgian Albums (Ultratop Flanders)	20
Belgian Albums (Ultratop Wallonia)	37
Brazilian Albums (ABPD)	17
Danish Albums (Hitlisten)	7
Dutch Albums (Album Top 100)	11
Finnish Albums (Suomen virallinen lista)	17
French Albums (SNEP)	26
German Albums (Offizielle Top 100)	100
Hungarian Albums (MAHASZ)	10
Italian Albums (FIMI)	7
Mexican Albums (AMPROFON)	4
New Zealand Albums Chart	9
Spanish Albums (PROMUSICAE)	12
Swedish Albums (Sverigetopplistan)	9
Swiss Albums (Schweizer Hitparade)	65
UK Albums (OCC)	5
Worldwide	4

Chart (2013)	Position
Australian Albums (ARIA)	42
Belgian Albums (Ultratop Flanders)	26
Belgian Albums (Ultratop Wallonia)	63
Canadian Albums (Billboard)	1
Dutch Albums (Album Top 100)	21
Hungarian Albums Chart	79
Mexican Albums (AMPROFON)	4
Spanish Albums (PROMUSICAE)	14
Swedish Albums (Sverigetopplistan)	32
Swiss Albums (Schweizer Hitparade)	60
UK Albums (OCC)	22
US Billboard 200	3

Chart (2020)	Position
Belgian Albums (Ultratop Flanders)	112
Irish Albums (IRMA)	42

Chart (2021)	Position
Belgian Albums (Ultratop Flanders)	118

Chart (2022)	Position
Belgian Albums (Ultratop Flanders)	188

Chart (2024)	Position
Belgian Albums (Ultratop Flanders)	178

=== Decade-end charts ===
Chart (2010–2019)	Position
Australian Albums (ARIA)	41
UK Albums (OCC)	41
US Billboard 200	94

== Certifications and sales ==
Region	Certification	Certified units/sales
Argentina	Platinum	
Australia (ARIA)	3× Platinum	210,000^{^}
Austria (IFPI Austria)	Gold	10,000^{*}
Belgium (BRMA)	Gold	15,000^{*}
Canada (Music Canada)	3× Platinum	240,000^{^}
Chile	2× Platinum	23,000
Denmark (IFPI Danmark)	4× Platinum	80,000^{‡}
Ecuador	Gold	
Finland (Musiikkituottajat)	Gold	19,919
France (SNEP)	Platinum	100,000^{*}
Germany (BVMI)	Gold	100,000^{^}
Greece (IFPI Greece)	2× Platinum	12,000^{^}
Hungary (MAHASZ)	Gold	3,000^{^}
Ireland (IRMA)	3× Platinum	45,000^{^}
Italy (FIMI)	3× Platinum	150,000^{*}
Japan (RIAJ)	Platinum	250,000^{^}
Mexico (AMPROFON)	Diamond+Platinum	360,000^{‡}
Netherlands (NVPI)	Platinum	50,000^{^}
New Zealand (RMNZ)	4× Platinum	60,000^{‡}
Norway (IFPI Norway)	Gold	15,000^{*}
Peru	Gold	
Philippines (PARI)	5× Platinum	75,000^{*}
Poland (ZPAV)	Platinum	20,000^{*}
Portugal (AFP)	2× Platinum	30,000^{^}
Singapore (RIAS)	Platinum	10,000^{*}
Spain (Promusicae)	2× Platinum	80,000^{^}
Sweden (GLF)	2× Platinum	80,000^{‡}
Switzerland (IFPI Switzerland)	Gold	15,000^{^}
United Kingdom (BPI)	4× Platinum	1,000,924
United States (RIAA)	3× Platinum	3,000,000^{‡}
Venezuela	Diamond	
Summaries
Europe (IFPI)	Platinum	1,000,000^{*}
^{*} Sales figures based on certification alone.^{^} Shipments figures based on certification alone.^{‡} Sales+streaming figures based on certification alone.

== Release history ==
Country	Date	Format(s)	Edition(s)
Netherlands	9 November 2012	CD; digital download	Standard; deluxe
Germany	9 November 2012	CD; digital download	Standard; deluxe
Australia	9 November 2012	CD; digital download	Standard; deluxe
United Kingdom	12 November 2012	CD; digital download	Standard; deluxe
United States	13 November 2012	CD; digital download	Standard; deluxe
Spain	13 November 2012	CD; digital download	Standard; deluxe
Japan	14 November 2012	CD; digital download	Standard; deluxe
China	30 December 2012	CD	Standard
China	28 June 2013	CD	Deluxe
