= Take Me Home Tour (One Direction) =

2013 concert tour by One Direction

- Tour by One Direction
- Location: Asia; Australia; Europe; New Zealand; North America
- Associated album: Take Me Home
- Start date: 23 February 2013
- End date: 3 November 2013
- Legs: 4
- No. of shows: 123
- Box office: $114 million ($157.56 in 2025 dollars)

One Direction concert chronology
- Up All Night Tour (2011–12); Take Me Home Tour (2013); Where We Are Tour (2014)

The Take Me Home Tour was the second headlining concert tour by English-Irish boy band One Direction, in support of their second studio album, Take Me Home (2012). The tour began on 23 February 2013 in London, England, and concluded on 3 November 2013 in Chiba, Japan. It was announced by member Liam Payne at the BRIT Awards in early 2012, originally billed as the UK & Ireland Arena Tour. In mid-2013, the tour expanded to include North America and Australia following the band's international breakthrough. The tour was documented in the film One Direction: This Is Us directed by Morgan Spurlock.

The Take Me Home Tour was commercially successful, with many sold-out shows and overwhelming demand for tickets, prompting organisers to add more dates to the itinerary. In the UK and Ireland, ticket sales reached 300,000 within a day of release, which included a six sell-out dates at the O2 Arena in London. In Australia and New Zealand, ticket sales grossed US$15.7 million, with all the 190,000 tickets sold for eighteen shows held in Australia and New Zealand. The tour placed at number 10 on Pollstar's Year-End Top 20 Worldwide Tours list, grossing $114 million from the 123 shows.

== Background ==
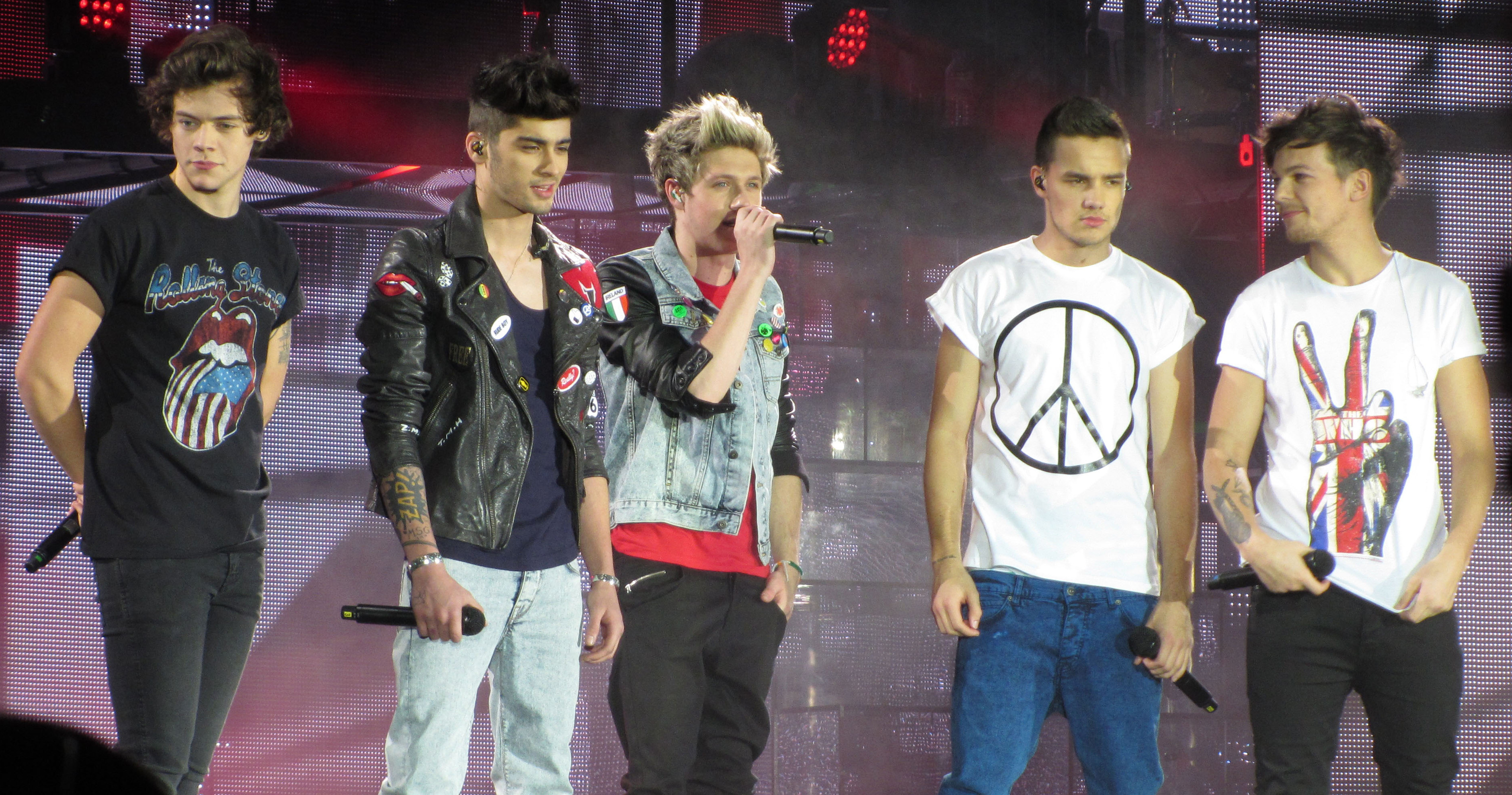
One Direction performing in Glasgow on 27 February 2013

On 21 February 2012, One Direction attended the 2012 BRIT Awards at which they received the Best British Single award for their debut single "What Makes You Beautiful". During One Direction's acceptance speech, member Liam Payne stated that they would embark on their first arena concert tour. Reports soon followed that the tour would consist of fifteen dates across the UK and Ireland. One Direction's official website confirmed the dates, with tickets to be made available on 25 February.

On 12 April 2012, the group announced the North American leg as a part of a '2013 World Tour'. The North American leg was set to begin a 25-city run in Sunrise, Florida, on 13 June 2013 and to stop in Toronto, Chicago, Denver, Montreal and Las Vegas before wrapping up in Los Angeles on 7 August. Tickets for the North American leg of the concert series went on sale 21 April 2012, at Ticketmaster.com and LiveNation.com. Group member Niall Horan said in a statement released to MTV News, "Our fans are simply the best in the world. The support they have shown us has been incredible and we're all so grateful to each and every one of them. We can't wait to see everyone this summer, at Madison Square Garden and of course when we play our world tour in 2013."

On 18 April 2012, the Australian leg was announced. The leg was set to begin in Brisbane on 13 September 2013 and visit Sydney, Melbourne and Adelaide before heading west to Perth. The tour then returned to the east coast for five additional shows before travelling to New Zealand for three shows. Tickets for the Australasian leg went on sale on 28 April 2012, except for the Perth dates, which went on sale on 28 June.

In June 2012, continental European dates were reported to be in the process of being added and were confirmed on 29 October 2012. The continental European dates compromises of shows in France, Norway, Sweden, Germany, Belgium, the Netherlands, Italy, Spain, Switzerland, Portugal and Denmark in April and May 2013. Tickets went on sale between 2 and 5 November 2012, depending on the venue.

== Commercial reception ==
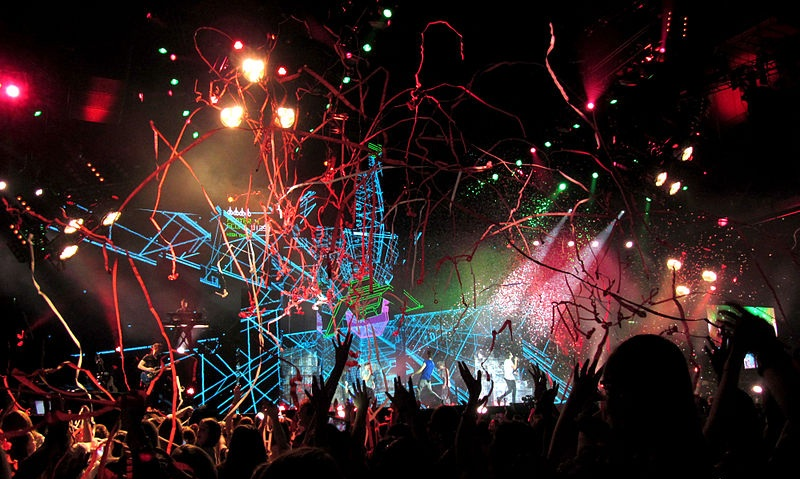
One Direction performing in Glasgow on 27 February 2013

Having initially announced 15 shows across the UK and Ireland, the group added extra shows around the UK and Ireland due to high demand, which included matinée performances at various dates. One Direction announced the extra shows on their Twitter page throughout the morning after the initial dates went on sale. British ticket sales reached 300,000 within a day of release. The original dates sold out within minutes—with 1,000 tickets selling per minute, with two or three extra dates having been added at each city. Notable dates that sold out include six dates at The O2 Arena in London, while four dates at The O2 in Dublin also sold out within an hour—as did four Belfast Odyssey Arena dates. In North America, the group added additional shows due to "overwhelming demand". The tickets for the added shows went on sale in May 2012. In Australia and New Zealand, tickets also ignited commercial success pulling sales of US$15.7million, with all 190,000 tickets being sold for eighteen shows to be held in Australia and New Zealand from September 2013. Tickets for the Perth shows, which went on sale later than the rest of Australia, sold out in six minutes.

In May 2012, as One Direction added more dates to their 2013 World Tour, Andy Greene, associate editor of Rolling Stone magazine, declared that the boy band are "being worked like dogs". The Daily Star Sunday revealed that many of their shows planned for 2013 had sold out and that they were adding an extra 25 performances in 20 US cities, some of which priced at more than £200 for one ticket. The article additionally noted that "One Direction could eclipse the big tour megabucks earned by rock giants U2 and The Rolling Stones". Greene ultimately declared: "I've never known a band announce a second summer tour before a first summer tour is over. It's insane – they're working them like dogs and printing money right now".

In July 2013, the tour ranked 12th on Pollstar's "Top 100 Mid Year Worldwide Tours", earning $49.6 million from 68 shows. The tour ranked 10th Pollstar's Year-End Top 20 Worldwide Tours list, grossing $114 million.

On 29 October 2013, it was announced that the band had sold a record-breaking 81,542 tickets at Sydney's Allphones Arena. The previous record was held by Metallica with 74,244. The executives of the arena unveiled the first entertainer's "Star" in the Sydney Olympic Park precinct to commemorate the achievement.

== Opening acts ==
- Camryn (Europe)
- 5 Seconds of Summer (Ireland, United Kingdom, North America, Australia, New Zealand)
- Olly Murs (Japan)

== Setlist ==
This set list is representative of the show on 24 February 2013 in London. It is not representative of all concerts for the duration of the tour.

1. "Up All Night"
2. "I Would"
3. "Heart Attack"
4. "More than This"
5. "Loved You First"
6. "One Thing"
7. "C'mon, C'mon"
8. "Change My Mind"
9. "One Way or Another (Teenage Kicks)"
10. "Last First Kiss"
11. "Moments"
12. "Back For You"
13. "Summer Love"
14. "Over Again"
15. "Little Things"
16. "Teenage Dirtbag" (Wheatus cover)
17. "Live While We're Young"
18. "Rock Me"
19. "She's Not Afraid"
20. "Kiss You"

Encore

21. "Best Song Ever"
22. "What Makes You Beautiful"

=== Notes ===
- During the show in Dublin, the group performed "The Fresh Prince of Bel-Air".
- During the show in Berlin, the group performed "My Heart Will Go On".
- During the show in Lisbon, the group performed "I Will Always Love You".
- During the show in San Jose, and until the end of the tour, the group performed "Best Song Ever".
- During the last show in Chiba, the group performed an acapella version of "Story of My Life".

== Tour dates ==
List of 2013 concerts, showing date, city, country, venue, opening act, tickets sold, number of available tickets and amount of gross revenue
Date	City	Country	Venue	Opening act	Attendance	Revenue
23 February 2013^{[A]}	London	England	The O_{2} Arena	5 Seconds of Summer	62,868 / 64,288	$3,276,740
24 February 2013^{[A]}	London	England	The O_{2} Arena	5 Seconds of Summer	62,868 / 64,288	$3,276,740
26 February 2013	Glasgow	Scotland	Scottish Exhibition and Conference Centre	5 Seconds of Summer	17,285 / 17,285	$1,037,099
27 February 2013	Glasgow	Scotland	Scottish Exhibition and Conference Centre	5 Seconds of Summer	17,285 / 17,285	$1,037,099
1 March 2013	Cardiff	Wales	Motorpoint Arena Cardiff	5 Seconds of Summer	17,622 / 19,976	$1,057,320
2 March 2013^{[A]}	Cardiff	Wales	Motorpoint Arena Cardiff	5 Seconds of Summer	17,622 / 19,976	$1,057,320
3 March 2013	Cardiff	Wales	Motorpoint Arena Cardiff	5 Seconds of Summer	17,622 / 19,976	$1,057,320
5 March 2013	Dublin	Ireland	The O_{2}	5 Seconds of Summer	^{[e]}	^{[e]}
6 March 2013	Dublin	Ireland	The O_{2}	5 Seconds of Summer	^{[e]}	^{[e]}
7 March 2013	Belfast	Ireland	Odyssey Arena	5 Seconds of Summer	33,624 / 33,624	$1,711,926
8 March 2013	Belfast	Ireland	Odyssey Arena	5 Seconds of Summer	33,624 / 33,624	$1,711,926
10 March 2013	Belfast	Ireland	Odyssey Arena	5 Seconds of Summer	33,624 / 33,624	$1,711,926
11 March 2013	Belfast	Ireland	Odyssey Arena	5 Seconds of Summer	33,624 / 33,624	$1,711,926
12 March 2013	Dublin	Ireland	The O_{2}	5 Seconds of Summer	35,241 / 35,260	$1,846,652
13 March 2013	Dublin	Ireland	The O_{2}	5 Seconds of Summer	35,241 / 35,260	$1,846,652
15 March 2013	Manchester	England	Manchester Arena	5 Seconds of Summer	42,882 / 43,515	$2,080,536
16 March 2013^{[A]}	Manchester	England	Manchester Arena	5 Seconds of Summer	42,882 / 43,515	$2,080,536
17 March 2013	Liverpool	England	Echo Arena Liverpool	5 Seconds of Summer	9,422 / 9,422	$565,319
19 March 2013	Sheffield	England	Motorpoint Arena Sheffield	5 Seconds of Summer	^{[f]}	^{[f]}
20 March 2013	Nottingham	England	Capital FM Arena	5 Seconds of Summer	7,554 / 7,554	$453,239
22 March 2013	Birmingham	England	LG Arena	5 Seconds of Summer	37,740 / 38,151	$1,843,509
23 March 2013^{[A]}	Birmingham	England	LG Arena	5 Seconds of Summer	37,740 / 38,151	$1,843,509
31 March 2013	Liverpool	England	Echo Arena Liverpool	5 Seconds of Summer	9,568 / 9,568	$574,080
1 April 2013	London	England	The O_{2} Arena	5 Seconds of Summer	93,277 / 95,916	$4,667,728
2 April 2013^{[A]}	London	England	The O_{2} Arena	5 Seconds of Summer	93,277 / 95,916	$4,667,728
4 April 2013	London	England	The O_{2} Arena	5 Seconds of Summer	93,277 / 95,916	$4,667,728
5 April 2013	London	England	The O_{2} Arena	5 Seconds of Summer	93,277 / 95,916	$4,667,728
6 April 2013	London	England	The O_{2} Arena	5 Seconds of Summer	93,277 / 95,916	$4,667,728
8 April 2013	Newcastle	England	Metro Radio Arena	5 Seconds of Summer	28,320 / 29,469	$1,378,383
9 April 2013	Newcastle	England	Metro Radio Arena	5 Seconds of Summer	28,320 / 29,469	$1,378,383
10 April 2013	Newcastle	England	Metro Radio Arena	5 Seconds of Summer	28,320 / 29,469	$1,378,383
12 April 2013	Glasgow	Scotland	Scottish Exhibition and Conference Centre	5 Seconds of Summer	8,621 / 8,621	$517,259
13 April 2013	Sheffield	England	Motorpoint Arena Sheffield	5 Seconds of Summer	33,978 / 34,098	$2,511,197
14 April 2013	Sheffield	England	Motorpoint Arena Sheffield	5 Seconds of Summer	33,978 / 34,098	$2,511,197
16 April 2013	Nottingham	England	Capital FM Arena	5 Seconds of Summer	7,513 / 7,513	$450,779
17 April 2013	Birmingham	England	LG Arena	5 Seconds of Summer	12,532 / 12,637	$612,596
19 April 2013	Manchester	England	Manchester Arena	5 Seconds of Summer	28,582 / 28,736	$893,930
20 April 2013	Manchester	England	Manchester Arena	5 Seconds of Summer	28,582 / 28,736	$893,930
29 April 2013	Paris	France	Palais Omnisports de Paris-Bercy	Camryn	11,222 / 11,222	$830,530
30 April 2013	Metz	France	Galaxie Amnéville	Camryn	5,895 / 9,500	$353,699
1 May 2013	Antwerp	Belgium	Sportpaleis	Camryn	15,137 / 15,137	$858,609
3 May 2013	Amsterdam	Netherlands	Ziggo Dome	Camryn	11,870 / 12,000	$661,726
4 May 2013	Oberhausen	Germany	König Pilsener Arena	Camryn	9,819 / 9,824	$509,565
5 May 2013	Herning	Denmark	Jyske Bank Boxen	Camryn	12,234 / 12,234	$734,040
7 May 2013	Bærum	Norway	Telenor Arena	Camryn	18,886 / 18,886	$1,133,160
8 May 2013	Stockholm	Sweden	Friends Arena	Camryn	29,723 / 29,723	$1,783,380
10 May 2013	Copenhagen	Denmark	Forum Copenhagen	Camryn	6,735 / 9,500	$404,018
11 May 2013	Berlin	Germany	O_{2} World Berlin	Camryn	11,816 / 11,816	$577,298
12 May 2013	Hamburg	Germany	O_{2} World Hamburg	Camryn	10,724 / 13,693	$542,683
16 May 2013	Zürich	Switzerland	Hallenstadion	Camryn	13,000 / 13,000	$996,075
17 May 2013	Munich	Germany	Olympiahalle	Camryn	10,283 / 10,283	$535,924
19 May 2013	Verona	Italy	Verona Arena	Camryn	12,248 / 15,000	$734,879
20 May 2013	Milan	Italy	Mediolanum Forum	Camryn	7,953 / 9,500	$477,179
22 May 2013	Badalona (Note: Labelled as Barcelona in promotional material.)	Spain	Pavelló Olímpic	Camryn	8,685 / 8,685	$521,099
24 May 2013	Madrid	Spain	Palacio Vistalegre	Camryn	18,680 / 18,680	$1,120,799
25 May 2013	Madrid	Spain	Palacio Vistalegre	Camryn	18,680 / 18,680	$1,120,799
26 May 2013	Lisbon	Portugal	MEO Arena	Camryn	12,040 / 15,000	$722,399
8 June 2013	Mexico City	Mexico	Foro Sol	JetLag	107,317 / 108,052	$6,244,771
9 June 2013	Mexico City	Mexico	Foro Sol	JetLag	107,317 / 108,052	$6,244,771
13 June 2013	Sunrise	United States	BB&T Center	5 Seconds of Summer	12,755 / 12,755	$903,306
14 June 2013	Miami	United States	American Airlines Arena	5 Seconds of Summer	13,838 / 13,838	$938,729
16 June 2013	Louisville	United States	KFC Yum! Center	5 Seconds of Summer	15,682 / 16,237	$980,588
18 June 2013	Columbus	United States	Nationwide Arena	5 Seconds of Summer	14,191 / 19,000	$922,459
19 June 2013	Nashville	United States	Bridgestone Arena	5 Seconds of Summer	13,422 / 13,422	$1,001,309
21 June 2013	Atlanta	United States	Philips Arena	5 Seconds of Summer	14,264 / 14,264	$917,424
22 June 2013	Raleigh	United States	PNC Arena	5 Seconds of Summer	13,494 / 19,000	$877,121
23 June 2013	Washington, D.C.	United States	Verizon Center	5 Seconds of Summer	13,992 / 13,992	$1,020,134
25 June 2013	Philadelphia	United States	Wells Fargo Center	5 Seconds of Summer	14,827 / 14,827	$1,072,786
26 June 2013	Mansfield	United States	Comcast Center	5 Seconds of Summer	16,034 / 18,500	$1,042,250
28 June 2013	Wantagh	United States	Nikon at Jones Beach Theater	5 Seconds of Summer	27,374 / 28,220	$1,779,343
29 June 2013	Wantagh	United States	Nikon at Jones Beach Theater	5 Seconds of Summer	27,374 / 28,220	$1,779,343
2 July 2013	East Rutherford	United States	Izod Center	5 Seconds of Summer	14,671 / 14,671	$1,021,706
4 July 2013	Montreal	Canada	Bell Centre	5 Seconds of Summer	14,573 / 14,573	$1,016,760
5 July 2013	Hershey	United States	Hersheypark Stadium	5 Seconds of Summer	62,722 / 62,722	$2,992,757
6 July 2013	Hershey	United States	Hersheypark Stadium	5 Seconds of Summer	62,722 / 62,722	$2,992,757
8 July 2013	Pittsburgh	United States	Consol Energy Center	5 Seconds of Summer	13,565 / 13,565	$866,391
9 July 2013	Toronto	Canada	Air Canada Centre	5 Seconds of Summer	29,424 / 29,424	$1,094,726
10 July 2013	Toronto	Canada	Air Canada Centre	5 Seconds of Summer	29,424 / 29,424	$1,094,726
12 July 2013	Auburn Hills	United States	The Palace of Auburn Hills	5 Seconds of Summer	16,397 / 16,397	$1,032,838
13 July 2013	Tinley Park	United States	First Midwest Bank Amphitheatre	5 Seconds of Summer	32,440 / 40,000	$2,108,653
14 July 2013	Tinley Park	United States	First Midwest Bank Amphitheatre	5 Seconds of Summer	32,440 / 40,000	$2,108,653
18 July 2013	Minneapolis	United States	Target Center	5 Seconds of Summer	13,665 / 13,665	$1,003,558
19 July 2013	Kansas City	United States	Sprint Center	5 Seconds of Summer	13,532 / 13,532	$868,230
21 July 2013	Houston	United States	Toyota Center	5 Seconds of Summer	12,715 / 12,715	$961,753
22 July 2013	Dallas	United States	American Airlines Center	5 Seconds of Summer	14,160 / 14,160	$959,468
24 July 2013	Denver	United States	Pepsi Center	5 Seconds of Summer	14,244 / 17,500	$925,880
25 July 2013	West Valley City	United States	Maverik Center	5 Seconds of Summer	10,158 / 10,402	$778,357
27 July 2013	Vancouver	Canada	Rogers Arena	5 Seconds of Summer	15,187 / 19,000	$937,849
28 July 2013	Seattle	United States	KeyArena	5 Seconds of Summer	-	—
30 July 2013	San Jose	United States	SAP Center	5 Seconds of Summer	13,887 / 18,500	$902,659
31 July 2013	Oakland	United States	Oracle Arena	5 Seconds of Summer	13,934 / 13,934	$987,479
2 August 2013	Las Vegas	United States	Mandalay Bay Events Center	5 Seconds of Summer	22,329 / 24,000	$1,451,432
3 August 2013	Las Vegas	United States	Mandalay Bay Events Center	5 Seconds of Summer	22,329 / 24,000	$1,451,432
4 August 2013	Chula Vista	United States	Sleep Train Amphitheatre	5 Seconds of Summer	13,213 / 18,000	$858,846
7 August 2013	Los Angeles	United States	Staples Center	5 Seconds of Summer	57,363 / 57,363	$3,998,657
8 August 2013	Los Angeles	United States	Staples Center	5 Seconds of Summer	57,363 / 57,363	$3,998,657
9 August 2013	Los Angeles	United States	Staples Center	5 Seconds of Summer	57,363 / 57,363	$3,998,657
10 August 2013	Los Angeles	United States	Staples Center	5 Seconds of Summer	57,363 / 57,363	$3,998,657
23 September 2013	Adelaide	Australia	Adelaide Entertainment Centre	5 Seconds of Summer	23,835 / 24,540	$1,976,100
24 September 2013	Adelaide	Australia	Adelaide Entertainment Centre	5 Seconds of Summer	23,835 / 24,540	$1,976,100
25 September 2013	Adelaide	Australia	Adelaide Entertainment Centre	5 Seconds of Summer	23,835 / 24,540	$1,976,100
28 September 2013	Perth	Australia	Perth Arena	5 Seconds of Summer	35,166 / 35,366	$2,944,504
29 September 2013^{[A]}	Perth	Australia	Perth Arena	5 Seconds of Summer	35,166 / 35,366	$2,944,504
2 October 2013	Melbourne	Australia	Rod Laver Arena	5 Seconds of Summer	94,457 / 97,376	$7,218,803
3 October 2013^{[A]}	Melbourne	Australia	Rod Laver Arena	5 Seconds of Summer	94,457 / 97,376	$7,218,803
5 October 2013	Sydney	Australia	Allphones Arena	5 Seconds of Summer	79,914 / 80,532	$6,646,154
6 October 2013	Sydney	Australia	Allphones Arena	5 Seconds of Summer	79,914 / 80,532	$6,646,154
10 October 2013	Christchurch	New Zealand	CBS Canterbury Arena	5 Seconds of Summer	7,877 / 8,230	$850,789
12 October 2013	Auckland	New Zealand	Vector Arena	5 Seconds of Summer	19,320 / 19,898	$1,890,767
13 October 2013	Auckland	New Zealand	Vector Arena	5 Seconds of Summer	19,320 / 19,898	$1,890,767
16 October 2013	Melbourne	Australia	Rod Laver Arena	5 Seconds of Summer	^{[d]}	^{[d]}
17 October 2013	Melbourne	Australia	Rod Laver Arena	5 Seconds of Summer	^{[d]}	^{[d]}
19 October 2013	Brisbane	Australia	Brisbane Entertainment Centre	5 Seconds of Summer	30,405 / 30,831	$2,637,087
20 October 2013	Brisbane	Australia	Brisbane Entertainment Centre	5 Seconds of Summer	30,405 / 30,831	$2,637,087
21 October 2013	Brisbane	Australia	Brisbane Entertainment Centre	5 Seconds of Summer	30,405 / 30,831	$2,637,087
23 October 2013	Sydney	Australia	Allphones Arena	5 Seconds of Summer	^{[e]}	^{[e]}
24 October 2013	Sydney	Australia	Allphones Arena	5 Seconds of Summer	^{[e]}	^{[e]}
25 October 2013	Sydney	Australia	Allphones Arena	5 Seconds of Summer	^{[e]}	^{[e]}
26 October 2013	Sydney	Australia	Allphones Arena	5 Seconds of Summer	^{[e]}	^{[e]}
28 October 2013	Melbourne	Australia	Rod Laver Arena	5 Seconds of Summer	^{[d]}	^{[d]}
29 October 2013	Melbourne	Australia	Rod Laver Arena	5 Seconds of Summer	^{[d]}	^{[d]}
30 October 2013	Melbourne	Australia	Rod Laver Arena	5 Seconds of Summer	^{[d]}	^{[d]}
2 November 2013	Chiba	Japan	Makuhari Messe	Olly Murs	—	—
3 November 2013	Chiba	Japan	Makuhari Messe	Olly Murs	—	—
Total					824,843 / 835,428 (98.7%)	$52,582,225

Festivals and other miscellaneous performances
^{A} Matinee and evening concerts
^{d} The score data is representative of the seven shows at Rod Laver Arena on 2–3, 16-17, 28–30 October respectively.
^{e} The score data is representative of the four shows at Dublin 3Arena on 3,5, 12-13 March respectively.
^{f} The score data is representative of the four shows at Motorpoint Arena Sheffield on 19 March, 13-14 April respectively.

== Notes ==
1.Data from study is collected from all worldwide concerts held between 1 January and 30 June 2013. All monetary figures are based in U.S. dollars. All information is based upon extensive research conducted by Pollstar.
