= Kiss You =

2013 single by One Direction

Single by One Direction

from the album Take Me Home
- A-side: "Kiss You"
- B-side: "Little Things"
- Released: 7 January 2013
- Recorded: 2012
- Genre: Power pop
- Length: 3:04
- Label: Syco; Columbia
- Songwriters: Rami Yacoub; Shellback; Carl Falk; Savan Kotecha; Kristian Lundin; Albin Nedler; Kristoffer Fogelmark
- Producers: Rami Yacoub; Carl Falk

One Direction singles chronology
"Little Things" (2012)	"Kiss You" (2013)	"One Way or Another (Teenage Kicks)" (2013)

Music video
- "Kiss You" on YouTube

"Kiss You" is a song by English-Irish boy band One Direction from their second studio album, Take Me Home (2012). It was released as the record's second single in Germany and the third and final single on 7 January 2013. The song was composed by Kristoffer Fogelmark, Kristian Lundin, Albin Nedler, Savan Kotecha, Shellback and its producers, Carl Falk and Rami Yacoub. "Kiss You" is an upbeat power pop song with electronic effects; the lyrics detail the narrator's infatuation with a significant other. Critics praised the song for its production, calling it a stand-out track on Take Me Home.

"Kiss You" became the group's sixth top-ten hit in Ireland and the United Kingdom while attaining top-forty positions in both Belgian territories (Flanders and Wallonia), as well as in Australia, Canada, Denmark, France, New Zealand, and the Netherlands. The single peaked at number 46 on the US Billboard Hot 100 and has been certified gold by the Recording Industry Association of America (RIAA) for shipments of 500,000 copies. One Direction performed "Kiss You" on both the UK and US versions of The X Factor and 3 major concert tours: the Take Me Home Tour (2013), the Where We Are Tour (2014) and the On the Road Again Tour (2015).

An accompanying music video for "Kiss You", designed to display the group's comedic timing, was directed by Vaughan Arnell, who had previously worked with the group on two other music videos. The clip depicts the band shooting various scenes via a green screen, which include sequences reminiscent of iconic music videos of songs such as the Beach Boys' "Surfer Girl", Elvis Presley's "Jailhouse Rock" and Rammstein's "Mein Land". The music video received 10.4 million views in 24 hours and positive commentary from reviewers, who appreciated its carefree, jubilant nature.

== Background and composition ==
"Kiss You" was written by Kristoffer Fogelmark, Kristian Lundin, Albin Nedler, Savan Kotecha, Shellback, and its producers, Carl Falk and Rami Yacoub. Falk, Kotecha, and Yacoub had collaboratively composed One Direction's previous hit singles, "What Makes You Beautiful", "One Thing", and "Live While We're Young". In April 2012, The Independent reported that Simon Cowell, the group's manager, had challenged prominent songwriters to compete for space on One Direction's second album. Falk said, "It's important to get their personalities on the music." In addition, the article reported that Syco Records was working on candidates that included Max Martin and Lundin.

"Kiss You" is an uptempo, upbeat power pop song that runs for a duration of 3:04 (3 minutes, four seconds). The track features electronic effects, colossal hooks, a "na na na" breakdown, and a Motown-tinged melody. One Direction's vocal range in the song span from the note of E_{4} to C♯_{6}. Instrumentation includes guitar strings, piano lines and vocals. Written in the key of E major, the beat is set in common time and moves at a quick 90 beats per minute, according to the digital sheet music published at Musicnotes.com by Sony/ATV Music Publishing. Likewise, Matt Collar from AllMusic noted that the track is "frenetically hyper". The lyrical content regards the protagonist's infatuation with a significant other, and incorporates euphemisms for sexual intercourse in the lines "If you don't wanna take it slow/And you just wanna take me home/Baby say yeah, yeah, yeah, yeah, yeah."

== Release and reception ==
"Kiss You" was chosen as the second US single and third international single from their second studio album, Take Me Home. Liam Payne, a group member, in a November 2012 interview with MTV News, explained why they chose "Kiss You" as the album's second single in the US. Payne was quoted as saying: "With the album, that's the first one that we listened to and we were like, 'Yeah, we love this song'". According to an MTV News article, the number was released digitally in the United States on 17 November 2012. By 18 January 2013, the song had not been officially promoted to US radio stations. The track, however, was released by Sony Music Entertainment on 8 February 2013, as the record's second single in Germany.

"Kiss You" was well received by music critics, who centred on its quality of production. Both Rolling Stone's Jon Dolan, who praised its effectiveness, and Chris Payne of Billboard, who appreciated the melody, described "Kiss You" as one of the album's highlights. Alexis Petridis for The Guardian commended the track's chorus as "hard to dislodge from your brain". Robert Copsey of Digital Spy noted the song's possibility to become an international hit, applauding it sonically. A reviewer for MTV News described the track's lyricism as "butterflies-inducing", and Sam Lansky of Idolator wrote that "Kiss You" is noticeably a stand-out track on its parent album. Melinda Newman, writing for HitFix, regarded the song as "a bouncy, electronic infectious ditty," while Chris Younie, a critic from 4Music, deemed it an "amazing pop song", lauding the group's falsetto and its "head-banging anthemic" chorus.

== Commercial performance ==
The single made its Irish Singles Chart debut at number 24 on the week ending 13 December 2012. It peaked at number seven on the week ending 17 January 2013, marking their sixth top ten appearance in Ireland. "Kiss You" entered at number 152 in the UK Singles Chart on 24 November 2012. It peaked at number nine on the UK Singles Chart on 26 January 2013, becoming One Direction's sixth top ten hit in the United Kingdom. On the week ending 18 November 2012, "Kiss You" debuted at number 90 on the United States Billboard Hot 100 due to digital download sales from its parent album. As a result of an "end-of-year download rush" on the week ending 30 December 2012, the track re-entered the Hot 100 at number 83. After the accompanying music video was released, the song re-entered the Hot 100 at number 65. "Kiss You" had sold 207,000 digital downloads in the US by 18 January 2013. The single ultimately peaked at number 46 on the Hot 100 and was certified gold by the Recording Industry Association of America (RIAA) on 25 April 2013, denoting shipments of 500,000 copies.

The song became One Direction's fourth top-forty hit on the Canadian Hot 100, peaking at number 30. The single bowed at number 13 on the Australian Singles Chart on 27 January 2013, marking its peak position and the group's fourth top twenty hit in Australia. The song has been certified platinum by the Australian Recording Industry Association (ARIA) for shipments of 70,000 copies. The track entered the New Zealand Singles Chart at number 17 on 11 January 2013. It peaked at number 13 in its third and fourth charting weeks, becoming the group's sixth top-forty appearance in New Zealand. "Kiss You" has received a gold certification from the Recording Industry Association of New Zealand (RIANZ), indicating sales of 7,500 copies. The track also reached the top 40 in both Belgian territories (Flanders and Wallonia), as well as in the Czech Republic, Denmark, France, the Netherlands, and South Korea. In addition, "Kiss You" received gold certifications from the IFPI Norway association

== Music video ==
The accompanying music video, directed by Vaughan Arnell, who had previously directed One Direction's music videos for "Live While We're Young" and "Little Things", was designed to showcase the group's comedic timing. Inspired by the Beach Boys, cult surfing films, Old Hollywood, and British cinema, the music video incorporates "a technicolor vibe and a British kind of romp", as noted by Arnell in an MTV News interview.

Shot by November 2012, the music video was characterised, in several MTV News interviews, as "bigger than anything we've done before" by Zayn Malik, as "a lot of hard work" by Payne, as "pure stupidity" by Louis Tomlinson, and as "I wouldn't say [it's] comedy, it's all tongue-in-cheek" by Arnell. Premiering worldwide on Vevo on 7 January 2013, the music video depicts the band shooting different scenes via a green screen, dressed as sailors, surfers, skiers and jailers. The video features scenes reminiscent of the films South Pacific, To Catch a Thief, Jailhouse Rock and Beach Blanket Bingo, as well as the iconic music videos of songs such as The Beach Boys' "Surfer Girl", Elvis Presley's "Blue Hawaii" and Rammstein's "Mein Land", among others.

The music video garnered 10.4 million views in 24 hours, failing to attain the Vevo record held by Justin Bieber's "Beauty and a Beat" music video (10.6 million). Despite a 34 per cent gain in weekly activity to their Vevo channel, with the clip's success and preceding teaser videos earning 38 million views during the week, One Direction held at number two on the Billboard's Social 50 chart A 15 per cent rise in Facebook reaction gave way to a 154,000 increase in Facebook likes during the week. 191,000 Twitter followers added contributed to their overall fan base increase as well.

Melinda Newman, a contributor for HitFix, favoured the clip as having "everything a video by a boy band should be" and found the group's careless tone delightful. Rebecca Macatee of E! Online praised its "intentionally cheesy and utterly adorable" sequences, and MTV News's Jocelyn Vena described the clip as "conquering old Hollywood". Molly Chance, writing for Zap2it, was convinced that upon watching the "adorable" music video, the viewer should have a hard time disliking the group. Mikael Wood, the critic for Los Angeles Times, commended the group for "having a genuinely great time", rather than going through the motions.

== Live performances ==
As part of its promotion, One Direction performed the song on televised programmes and during three of their worldwide tours: the Take Me Home Tour (2013), the Where We Are Tour (2014), and the On the Road Again Tour (2015). "Kiss You" was included in the set list of the group's 3 December 2012 sold-out show at New York City's Madison Square Garden. One Direction performed the track on The Today Show at the Rockefeller Center on 23 August 2013. The group delivered a performance of "Kiss You", in front of a video game-themed set, on the final of the ninth series of The X Factor UK on 10 December 2012. On 12 December 2012, the group also performed the number on the final of the second season of The X Factor USA. Considering One Direction the "franchise's biggest success story", an editor for The Huffington Post opined that the boy band's prominent presence on both the US and UK versions of The X Factor seemed fitting.

== Track listing ==
CD single

1. "Kiss You" – 3:04
2. "Little Things" – 3:42

== Credits and personnel ==
Credits are adapted from the liner notes of Take Me Home.

- Carl Falk — writing, production, programming, instruments, guitar, background vocals
- Kristoffer Fogelmark — background vocals
- Niall Horan — additional guitar
- Savan Kotecha — writing, background vocals
- Kristian Lundin — writing
- Albin Nedler — writing, background vocals
- Shellback — writing
- Rami Yacoub — writing, production, programming, instruments, bass

== Charts ==
=== Weekly charts ===
Chart (2013)	Peak position
Australia (ARIA)	13
Austria (Ö3 Austria Top 40)	57
Belgium (Ultratop 50 Flanders)	30
Belgium (Ultratop 50 Wallonia)	33
Brazil (Billboard Brasil Hot 100)	86
Brazil Hot Pop Songs	28
Canada Hot 100 (Billboard)	30
Czech Republic Airplay (ČNS IFPI)	19
Denmark (Tracklisten)	24
Euro Digital Song Sales (Billboard)	16
France (SNEP)	36
Germany (GfK)	69
Ireland (IRMA)	7
Italy (FIMI)	47
Japan (Japan Hot 100)	18
Mexico (Billboard Mexican Airplay)	15
Mexico Anglo (Monitor Latino)	13
Netherlands (Dutch Top 40)	15
Netherlands (Single Top 100)	30
New Zealand (Recorded Music NZ)	13
Scottish Singles Sales (Official Charts)	7
Romania (Airplay 100)	76
South Korea (Gaon Music Chart)	16
Sweden (Sverigetopplistan)	50
Switzerland (Schweizer Hitparade)	45
UK Singles (Official Charts)	9
UK Airplay (Music Week)	13
US Billboard Hot 100	46
US Pop Airplay (Billboard)	19

=== Year-end charts ===
Chart (2013)	Position
Netherlands (Dutch Top 40)	90
UK Singles (Official Charts Company)	90

== Certifications ==
Region	Certification	Certified units/sales
Australia (ARIA)	2× Platinum	140,000^{‡}
Canada (Music Canada)	2× Platinum	160,000^{‡}
Italy (FIMI)	Gold	35,000^{‡}
Japan (RIAJ)	Gold	100,000^{*}
Mexico (AMPROFON)	Platinum+Gold	90,000^{‡}
New Zealand (RMNZ)	Platinum	15,000^{*}
Norway (IFPI Norway)	Platinum	10,000^{*}
Spain (Promusicae)	Gold	30,000^{‡}
Sweden (GLF)	Platinum	40,000^{‡}
United Kingdom (BPI)	Platinum	600,000^{‡}
United States (RIAA)	Gold	959,000
Streaming
Denmark (IFPI Danmark)	Platinum	1,800,000^{†}
Japan (RIAJ)	Gold	50,000,000^{†}
^{*} Sales figures based on certification alone.^{‡} Sales+streaming figures based on certification alone.^{†} Streaming-only figures based on certification alone.

== Release history ==
Country	Date	Format	Label
Germany	7 January 2013	CD single	Syco
United States	29 January 2013	Contemporary hit radio	Columbia
Italy	15 February 2013	Contemporary hit radio	Sony
