= Little Things (One Direction song) =

2012 single by One Direction

Single by One Direction

from the album Take Me Home
- B-side: "Kiss You"
- Released: 12 November 2012
- Studio: Sticky (Windlesham, Surrey)
- Genre: Pop; folk
- Length: 3:39
- Label: Syco
- Songwriters: Ed Sheeran; Fiona Bevan
- Producer: Jake Gosling

One Direction singles chronology
| "Live While We're Young" (2012) | "Little Things" (2012) | "Kiss You" (2013) |

Music video
- "Little Things" on YouTube

"Little Things" is a song by English-Irish boy band One Direction from their second studio album, Take Me Home (2012). It was released by Syco Music on 12 November 2012 as the record's second single. The song was written by Fiona Bevan and Ed Sheeran, and produced by Jake Gosling. Bevan brought the song to Sheeran's attention while he was in studio with the group in 2012, resulting in the band recording it. "Little Things" is a mid-tempo pop and folk ballad about the insistence that flaws are what make a person unique.

The track received mixed reviews from contemporary music critics, many of whom felt that the song was not tailored to the group. The song became the group's second number-one hit in the United Kingdom, while reaching the top ten in Australia, Ireland, and New Zealand. In addition, it attained top forty positions in Belgium (Wallonia), Canada, Denmark, Sweden, Switzerland, and the United States. The single has been certified platinum by the Recording Industry Association of America (RIAA) for shipments of 1,000,000 copies.

Directed by Vaughan Arnell, the accompanying music video was shot in black-and-white and consists of a simplistic concept – One Direction recording the song. Upon release, it received positive reviews from reviewers, who noted that it was a perfect accompaniment for the song. The band performed the track on both the UK and US versions of The X Factor and during their 3 major concert tours: Take Me Home Tour (2013), Where We Are Tour (2014) and On the Road Again Tour (2015).

== Background and conception ==
"Little Things" was written by British singer-songwriters Ed Sheeran and Fiona Bevan, and produced by Jake Gosling. In February 2012, One Direction expressed interest in working with Sheeran for their second studio album. In June 2012, Sheeran disclosed that One Direction would be recording two of his songs. In October 2012, Sheeran acknowledged Bevan's songwriting credit in an interview with British radio network Capital FM: "The great thing about it is I wrote that song with a girl called Fiona Bevan when I was 17 and we lost the song. I've kept in touch with Fiona, we've done gigs and stuff and about two months ago she sent me the tune and was like, 'Oh, do you remember this?' I was like, 'Yeah, I do remember that', and I was in the studio with the One Direction boys at the time and I was playing it and they were like, 'We really like that'. It's got one of my favourite lines that I've ever written in a song." On 15 October 2012, Louis Tomlinson confirmed via social networking website Twitter that "Little Things" would serve as the second single of their second studio album Take Me Home.

== Composition and lyrics ==
"Little Things" is a mid-tempo pop and folk ballad which runs for 3:39 (3 minutes, 39 seconds). Written in the key of G major, the beat is set in common time and moves at a moderate 110 beats per minute. One Direction's vocal range in the song span from the note of A_{3} to D_{5}. Instrumentation includes guitar strings, piano lines and vocals. The song utilises an acoustic guitar riff and a rotation of lead vocals. The song's lyrics revolve around the insistence that flaws are what make a person unique. In a September 2012 interview with MTV News, Sheeran quipped that the song "is about the best things about someone, kind of like the things you wouldn't expect." He described "Little Things" as an "appreciation song," and concluded: "Seventeen-year-old Ed just wrote a lot of love songs".

== Critical reception ==
"Little Things" received mixed reviews from music critics. Grady Smith for Entertainment Weekly described its lyricism as "terribly misguided" for One Direction's target audience. Melinda Newman of HitFix, polarised by its lyrical content, wrote that women want men to pretend their flaws do not exist and not see them. Both Kate Wills of The Independent and Rolling Stone writer Jon Dolan criticised the lyrical content as jarring. Although Bill Lamb of Dotdash shared Smith's sentiment, he favoured Gosling's "beautiful" production of the song and the group's "top notch" vocal performance. Al Fox of BBC Music, who noted a "pursuit for credibility", felt that One Direction were "handing in their identity" with "Little Things". Jon Caramanica of The New York Times dismissed Sheeran's songwriting as "unusually lumpy in the hands of such a polished group". In contrast, Alexis Petridis for The Guardian described the track as "noticeably more sophisticated lyrically and emotionally than anything else on the album." The Boston Globe editor Sarah Rodman selected the "essential" song as the album's "best" attribute, and Matt Collar from AllMusic considered the ballad "an air of maturity to One Direction's admittedly squeaky-fresh sound." Robert Copsey of Digital Spy felt that "Little Things" can be interpreted as "minor signs of growth" for the boy band.

== Commercial performance ==
"Little Things" made its Irish Singles Chart debut at number two in the week ending 15 November 2012, marking One Direction's fifth top-ten hit in Ireland. The track debuted at number one on the UK Singles Chart on 18 November 2012, becoming One Direction's second number-one hit in the United Kingdom. Their second studio album Take Me Home and the single both debuted simultaneously at number one in the UK, making One Direction the youngest act in British chart history to achieve the feat. In addition, the song became a top forty hit in Belgium (Wallonia), Denmark, Sweden, and Switzerland. It became their third song to attain a top-forty position in both Sweden and Belgium (Wallonia). Elsewhere in Europe, the song charted in lower regions on the singles charts of Austria, Belgium (Flanders), France, Germany, and Slovakia.

The single bowed at number nine on the Australian Singles Chart of 25 November 2012, marking its peak position and the group's fourth top ten hit in Australia. It held that position for a second week and has been certified quadruple platinum by the Australian Recording Industry Association (ARIA), denoting shipments of 280,000 copies. The track made its New Zealand Singles Chart debut at number two on 19 November 2012, denoting its highest charting position and the quintet's third top five appearance in New Zealand. "Little Things" has received a gold certification from the Recording Industry Association of New Zealand (RIANZ), indicating sales of 7,500 copies.

The ballad became One Direction's fourth top forty hit on the Canadian Hot 100, peaking at number 20. In the week ending 18 November 2012, "Little Things" debuted on the United States Billboard Hot 100 at number 41, selling 91,000 copies in its first week. As a result of an "end-of-year download rush" in the week ending 30 December 2012, the single's weekly sales rose 189% from the previous week to 153,000 copies sold. The sales rise signified a new peak of number 33 on the Hot 100 by the single's seventh charting week. The track marks the boy band's fourth top forty hit on the Hot 100 and also attained positions on the Pop Songs and Hot 100 Airplay charts, peaking at numbers 18 and 61, respectively. "Little Things" had sold 502,000 copies in the United States by 7 January 2013. The single was certified platinum by the Recording Industry Association of America (RIAA) on 9 May 2013, denoting shipments of 1,000,000 copies.

A 2020 survey by OnBuy found that couples that chose Little Things as the song for the first dance at their wedding were the least likely to stay together, with 75% of respondents who chose the song later ending their marriage.

== Music video ==
The music video for "Little Things" was shot entirely in black-and-white and directed by Vaughan Arnell, who had previously directed the band's music video for their previous single "Live While We're Young". Tomlinson disclosed via social networking website Twitter that an accompanying music video for "Little Things" was in production on 15 October 2012. Band member Zayn Malik confirmed that they had finished filming the video the following day. On each of the five days preceding the video's premiere, One Direction posted a teaser trailer of the video online. Each teaser showed footage from the video and behind the scenes, and one member of the band announcing how many days were left until the video premiere. The official video was uploaded to their Vevo account on YouTube on 2 November 2012.

The music video, which was shot in black-and-white, depicts a simplistic concept – a One Direction recording session.

The music video consists of a simplistic concept – a One Direction recording session. In a November 2012 interview with MTV News, Arnell said he did not want to make it about anything more than that, "When I first heard the track, the mix on it was so simple and so pure and you could hear all the qualities of the voices on the track, I just wanted to come up with something that when the viewer watched it, it was almost like sitting there listening to the boys sing the track." Arnell subsequently developed the idea of a recording studio setting, thinking that it was "the most pure way to do it". He wanted to make the music video as "uncontrived as possible" without "any other bullsh-- or effects in the way of it." While Arnell conceded that music video may seem like a simple concept, the shoot itself took over twelve hours to complete and said that it was "one of the hardest things I've ever done." The group performed it "over and over again because I was just trying to get different shots, different angles, different qualities." As for the decision to shoot the video in black-and-white, Arnell felt it best captured the essence of the ballad. He also noted that was his intention to give the music video the feeling as if One Direction are singing it right to you, "It's purely about the clarity of it. When you sit there watching it, it's almost like these little bits of eye contact [and] you really feel like the guys are singing it to you."

Upon release, '#LittleThingsOnVEVO' became the number-one trending topic worldwide on social networking website Twitter. Following the release of the music video for "Little Things" and its accompanying teaser videos, One Direction posted a 138% increase in Vevo plays and a 159% increase in Facebook reaction in the United States. As a result of the video schedule, the group topped Billboard's Social 50 chart for the first time in their 52nd week on the chart, rising 10–1 from the previous week. Jocelyn Vena of MTV News characterised it as a straightforward video, which has a "quiet tone" that "complements the ballad's sentimental lyrics." Sam Lanksy for Idolator called it "sweet and subdued" and noted that the video is a significant transition from the "over-the-top jubilance" of their "Live While We're Young" video, writing that the contrast "is nice – even if the ultimate effect is a little sleepy." A reviewer of The Huffington Post favoured "the low-key, laid-back" approach to the video and concluded that the "intimate feel of the video perfectly accompanies the songs' sweet lyrics". An editor for Capital FM highlighted sequences in which the boy band "share individual emotionally charged scenes."

== Live performances ==
One Direction performed "Little Things" and "Live While We're Young" on The X Factor USA (8 November), and "Little Things" on The X Factor UK (11 November). The band performed the song along with "What Makes You Beautiful", "Live While We're Young", and "Kiss You" on The Today Show at the Rockefeller Center (13 November). They performed "Live While We're Young" and "Little Things" on the BBC's Children in Need 2012 telethon (16 November). In addition, they performed "Little Things" on British television series Surprise, Surprise (18 November – Recorded 21 October), at the 2012 Royal Variety Performance (19 November), in the presence of Queen Elizabeth II, and on The X Factor Australia (20 November). "Little Things" was included on the set list of the group's headlining sold-out show at Madison Square Garden (3 December). They also performed 3 major concert tours: Take Me Home Tour (2013), Where We Are Tour (2014) & On the Road Again Tour (2015).

== Credits and personnel ==
Credits are adapted from the liner notes for Take Me Home.

- Ed Sheeran – writing
- Fiona Bevan – writing
- Tommy Culm – backing vocals
- Jake Gosling – production
- Chris Leonard – guitar

== Charts ==
=== Weekly charts ===
Weekly chart performance for "Little Things"
| Chart (2012–2013) | Peak position |
|---|---|
| Australia (ARIA) | 9 |
| Australia Digital Songs (Billboard) | 6 |
| Austria (Ö3 Austria Top 40) | 43 |
| Belgium (Ultratop 50 Flanders) | 30 |
| Belgium (Ultratop 50 Flanders Airplay) | 1 |
| Belgium (Ultratip Bubbling Under Wallonia) | 5 |
| Brazil (Billboard Brasil Hot 100) | 3 |
| Brazil Hot Pop Songs | 17 |
| Canada Hot 100 (Billboard) | 20 |
| Canada Hot Digital Singles (Billboard) | 9 |
| Denmark (Tracklisten) | 23 |
| Europe Digital Tracks (Billboard) | 2 |
| Europe Digital Songs (Billboard) | 2 |
| France (SNEP) | 58 |
| Germany (GfK) | 89 |
| Ireland (IRMA) | 2 |
| Ireland Digital Songs (Billboard) | 2 |
| Israel International Airplay (Media Forest) | 5 |
| Mexico (Billboard Mexican Airplay) | 1 |
| New Zealand (Recorded Music NZ) | 2 |
| New Zealand Digital Songs (Billboard) | 1 |
| Russia Airplay (Tophit) | 91 |
| Scottish Singles Sales (Official Charts) | 1 |
| Slovakia Airplay (ČNS IFPI) | 3 |
| South Korea International Singles (Gaon) | 7 |
| Sweden (Sverigetopplistan) | 27 |
| Switzerland (Schweizer Hitparade) | 38 |
| UK Singles (Official Charts) | 1 |
| UK Airplay (Music Week) | 9 |
| UK Digital Songs (Billboard) | 1 |
| US Billboard Hot 100 | 33 |
| US Pop Airplay (Billboard) | 18 |

=== Year-end charts ===
Year-end chart performance for "Little Things"
| Chart (2012) | Position |
|---|---|
| UK Singles (OCC) | 65 |
| Chart (2013) | Position |
| Canada (Canadian Hot 100) | 99 |
| UK Singles (OCC) | 123 |
| US Pop Digital Song Sales (Billboard) | 44 |

== Certifications ==
Certifications and sales for "Little Things"
| Region | Certification | Certified units/sales |
|---|---|---|
| Australia (ARIA) | 4× Platinum | 280,000^{‡} |
| Canada (Music Canada) | 2× Platinum | 160,000^{‡} |
| Italy (FIMI) | Gold | 25,000^{‡} |
| Mexico (AMPROFON) | Platinum+Gold | 90,000^{‡} |
| New Zealand (RMNZ) | 2× Platinum | 60,000^{‡} |
| Norway (IFPI Norway) | 2× Platinum | 20,000^{*} |
| Spain (Promusicae) | Gold | 30,000^{‡} |
| Sweden (GLF) | Platinum | 40,000^{‡} |
| United Kingdom (BPI) | 2× Platinum | 1,250,000 |
| United States (RIAA) | Platinum | 1,138,000 |
^{*} Sales figures based on certification alone.^{‡} Sales+streaming figures based on certification alone.

== Release history ==
Release dates and formats for "Little Things"
| Region | Date | Format | Label |
|---|---|---|---|
| United States | 20 November 2012 | Contemporary hit radio | Columbia |
| Italy | 3 December 2012 | Contemporary hit radio | Sony |
