= Up All Night Tour =

2011–2012 concert tour by One Direction

- Tour by One Direction
- Promotional image for the tour in North America
- Location: Australia; Europe; New Zealand; North America
- Associated album: Up All Night
- Start date: 18 December 2011
- End date: 1 July 2012
- Legs: 3
- No. of shows: 54

One Direction concert chronology
- Up All Night Tour (2011–12); Take Me Home Tour (2013)

The Up All Night Tour was the first headlining concert tour by English-Irish boy band One Direction, in support of their debut studio album, Up All Night (2011). It began in December 2011 and was One Direction's first solo tour after being formed in the seventh series of The X Factor and being signed to Syco Records. The concert tour was announced in September 2011, with the initial dates for UK and Ireland being revealed. The tour eventually expanded to Oceania and North America, with the band playing 54 shows in total.

The setlist encompassed songs from One Direction's debut album and five covers. Critics commended One Direction's singing abilities and stage presence, and the production of the show. The tour was commercially successful, and a recording of the concert at the Bournemouth International Centre was made for Up All Night: The Live Tour, which was released on DVD in May 2012. The DVD was a commercial success, topping the charts in twenty-five countries, and made chart history in the US. By August 2012, the video album had sold in excess of one million copies worldwide.

== Background ==
After being formed and finishing third in the seventh series of The X Factor in 2010, One Direction were signed to Syco Music. The group and nine other contestants from the series participated in The X Factor Live Tour 2011 from February 2011 to April 2011. The tour saw the group performing for 500,000 people throughout the UK. While performing on The X Factor Live Tour 2011 in April 2011, the group revealed that they would be embarking on a solo tour "soon".

One Direction's debut headline UK concert tour, the Up All Night Tour, was officially announced on 27 September 2011. Set for December 2011 and January 2012, the tour would showcase their then-upcoming debut album, and would commence on 18 December 2011 in Watford, England and end on 26 January 2012 in Belfast, Northern Ireland. One Direction announced the solo tour shortly after releasing their first single, "What Makes You Beautiful". Shows in the UK and Ireland were instant sell-outs causing additional shows to be added. In February 2012, One Direction announced the Oceania leg, with tour dates scheduled for April 2012, visiting Sydney, Brisbane, Melbourne, Auckland and Wellington. While promoting the tour, band member Liam Payne stated the group wanted this trek to be a "world tour". Once the first leg of the tour was complete, the band joined Big Time Rush as the opening act on the Better With U Tour.

During a break from concerts, One Direction promoted their album in the United States. Following an appearance on The Today Show, Up All Night was released in the US and One Direction became the first ever UK group to have their debut album bow atop the Billboard 200. This led to the group extending the tour into North America. On 21 March 2012, One Direction announced the North American leg of the tour. The North American leg would start on 24 May 2012 and comprise 26 shows. Shortly after, English singer-songwriter Olly Murs was confirmed to be the opening act for select dates on the tour.

== Reception ==
=== Critical response ===
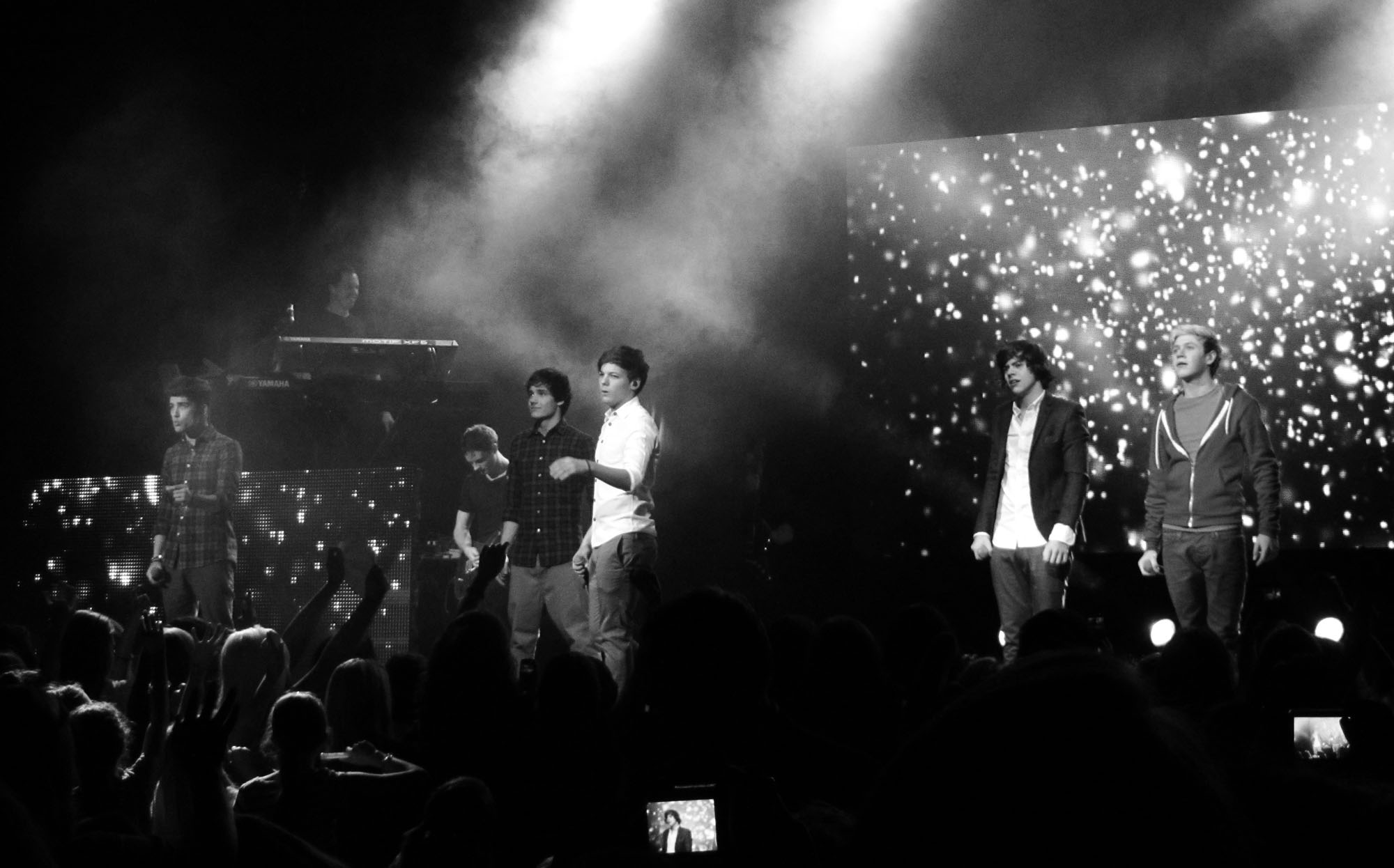
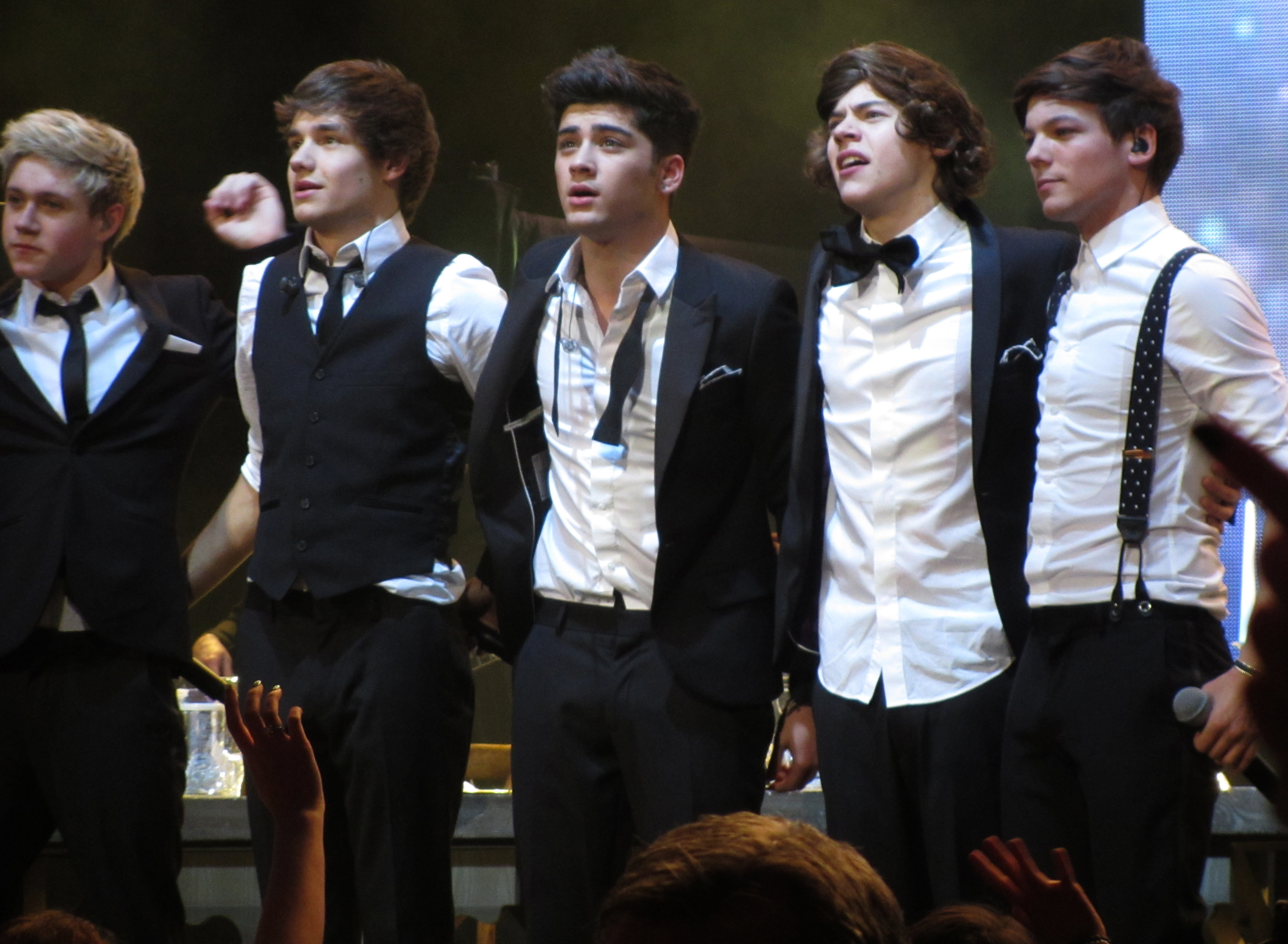
One Direction during the concert in Glasgow, Scotland

The concerts in England and Ireland received mixed feedback from critics. Kitty Empire of The Observer was not impressed with the show at Windsor Hall. Empire wrote, "It's easy to sneer at boy bands, but always worth considering their appeal. It goes without saying that One Direction are slick, and often bland. With the exception of their persuasive No 1 single, "What Makes You Beautiful", their songs aren't wildly distinctive". For the concert at the Hammersmith Apollo in London, James Robertson of Daily Mirror gave the band a positive review. He states, "The room shook with hair raising, ear drum piercing and (if there had been windows) glass-shattering screams. Each took a turn walking forward to embrace the cries from the sold-out Hammersmith Apollo while singing the lame-named Na, Na, Na. It was impossible to tell which one of the five boys had the biggest ovation but the loudest cheer came when Niall played acoustic guitar as they sang solo around an artificial camp fire". The show was positively reviewed by Alexandra Ryan of Evening Herald for the concert at Dublin's The O_{2}. She says, "They came, they saw, they conquered. Dreams came true for thousands of Irish female fans as their pop idols One Direction took to the stage at the O2. Swarms of screaming girls flocked to the sold-out venue last night as Zayn, Harry, Louis, Liam and Mullingar teen Niall Horan performed for 14,000 fans".

As the tour progressed to Oceania and North America, many critics remarked on the band's popularity and their singing abilities. For the Sydney concert at Hordern Pavilion, Mike Wass from Idolator felt One Direction's "surprisingly accomplished effort" of Kings of Leon's "Use Somebody" proved that they are "more than capable" of evolving their sound. Cameron Adams of Herald Sun wrote a positive review for the concert in Melbourne at the Hisense Arena. He assessed that One Direction represented a "cleverly cast pop band with plenty of personality unleashed at the perfect time and seizing their moment." He opined that the covers performed showcased "strong pop voices." Adams concluded as follows: "Who knows if they'll progress beyond the usual boy band lifespan. But for now they're making a lot of people very happy." Reviewing the concert in Fairfax at the Patriot Center, Chris Richards of The Washington Post wrote: "Over the course of umpteen songs, its members didn't work the stage so much as loiter on it. They looked comfortable. No silly choreography, just a few ensemble fist-pumps. No ridiculous costumes, just letterman jackets, cardigans and khakis. A no-nonsense backing band — guitar, bass, keyboards and drums — provided steady renditions of nearly all of the songs on the group's debut album, "Up All Night", as well as a few covers, including Kings of Leon's "Use Somebody" and Natalie Imbruglia's "Torn."

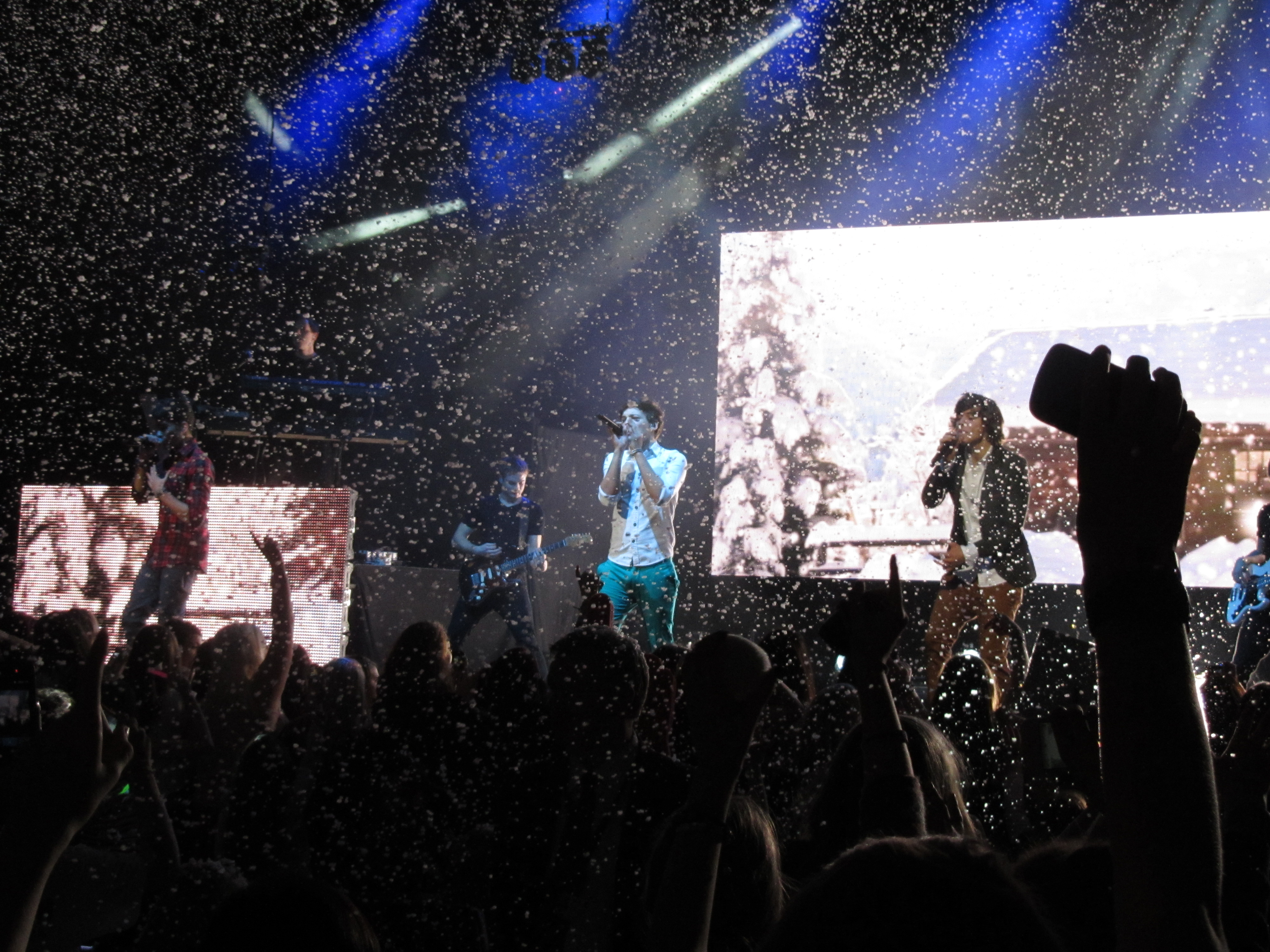
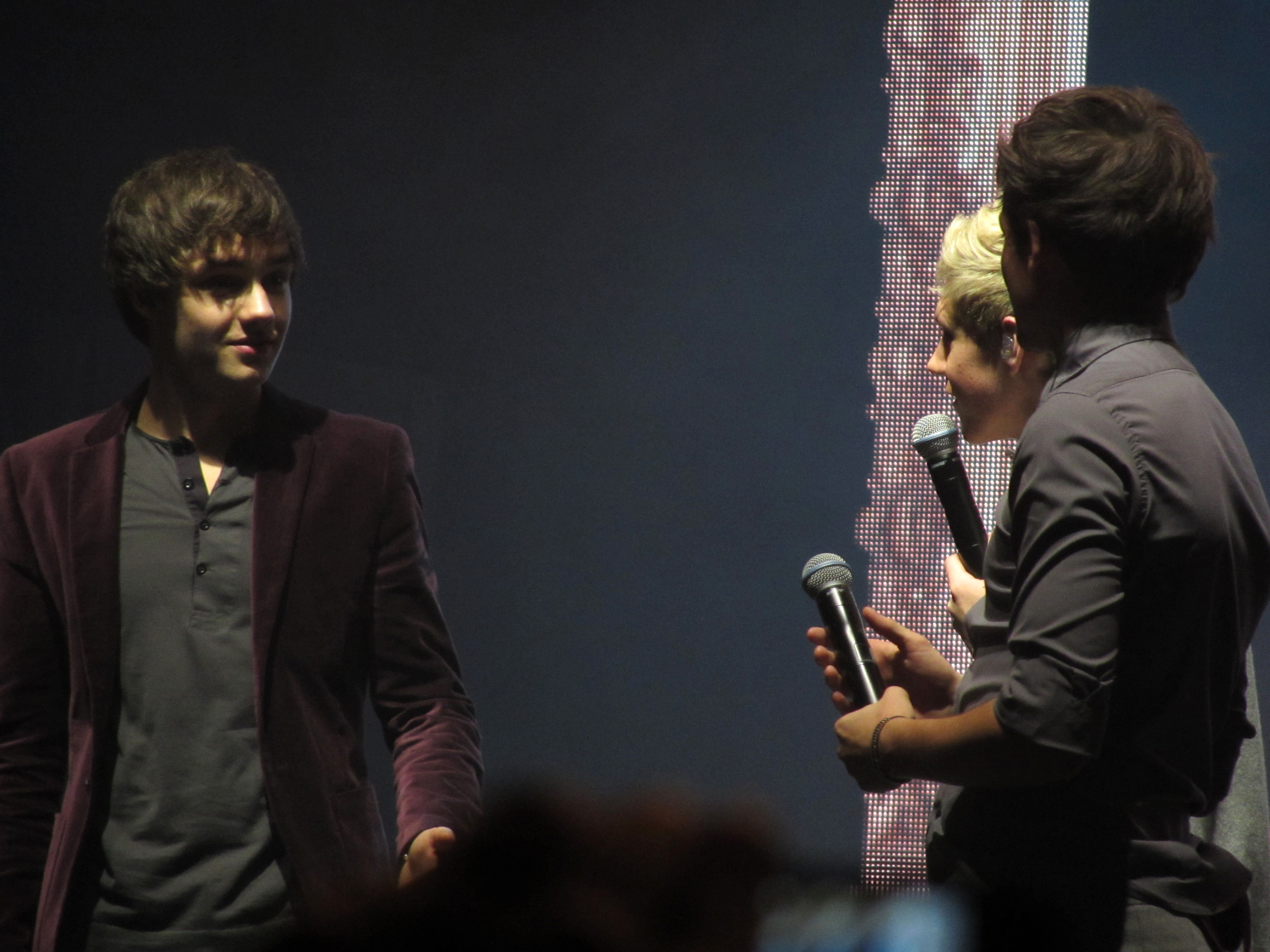
One Direction performing "One Thing" (left). Payne, Horan and Tomlinson answering Twitter questions (right).

Lars Brandle of Billboard reviewed the concert at the BBEC Great Hall in Brisbane. Brandle predominantly noted the band's popularity: "To say 1D is the hottest boy-band on the scene, doesn't quite grasp the situation. "On fire" is closer to the mark." Brandle commended the show for being "all slick, clean fun". Erica Futterman of Rolling Stone highlighted the group's acoustic performances, which "showed off Horan's ability to play guitar, as well as One Direction's admirable live vocals". Futterman concluded that there "was no need to worry about a backing track or a bum note, a pleasant realisation at a pop show". Jane Stevenson from Canoe.ca maintained that the show at the Molson Canadian Amphitheatre in Toronto had "none of that choreographed dance move nonsense", and complimented the "naturally, classy, low-key" production. Melody Lau of National Post reviewed the same concert. Lau opined, "It's easy to get lost in inherent appeal of their perfectly coiffed dos and almost-too-put-together preppy style but somewhere in the midst of all the love-struck squeals of teenage girls are guys who can actually sing and, to a certain extent, entertain." Lau additionally noted One Direction's lack of original material to perform, "the group falls back on a handful of covers to fill in their set, including Kings of Leon's "Use Somebody", Gym Class Heroes' "Stereo Hearts" and, surprisingly, Natalie Imbruglia's "Torn". Not straying too far away from the originals, the mid-show medley definitely felt like the boys randomly belting out songs for the sake of filler but girls didn't mind."

=== Commercial performance ===
When tickets for the shows in the UK and Ireland went on sale, concerts reportedly became sell-outs within minutes. It was reported nearly 10,000 tickets were sold in 10 minutes for the band's shows in Auckland and Wellington. The sellout success continued in Australia. There, the band's shows in Sydney, Melbourne and Brisbane sold out in three minutes. Shows in the United States also sold out within minutes.

== Recording ==
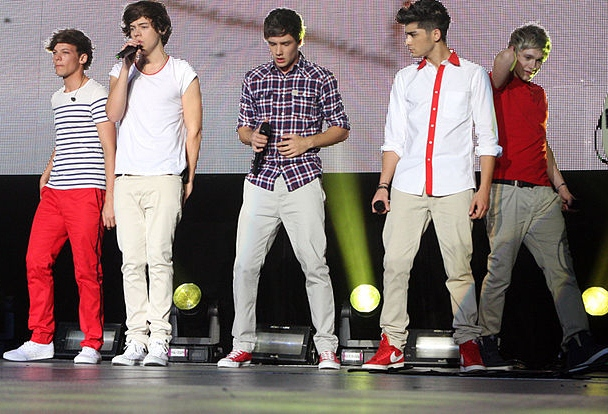
One Direction performing in Sydney

A recording of the Up All Night Tour was filmed during One Direction's 3 January 2012 show at the International Centre in Bournemouth. Documenting the whole concert with intersperses of backstage footage, a video album, Up All Night: The Live Tour, was released on DVD in May 2012. The video concert DVD topped the charts in twenty-five countries. In Australia, it debuted at number one on the ARIA DVD chart and was certified six times platinum by the Australian Recording Industry Association (ARIA) for shipments of 90,000 units in its first week of sale. In the United States, it debuted at number one on the Billboard DVD chart, selling 76,000 copies, surpassing sales of the Billboard 200 number one album, John Mayer's Born and Raised, which sold 65,000 copies. One Direction made US chart history as the feat marks the first time a music DVD outsold the Billboard 200 number one album. The opening sales also makes it the highest music DVD debut of 2012 and the second highest debut in the past five years behind Adele's Live at the Royal Albert Hall, which launched at number one in December 2011, with 96,000 copies. As of August 2012, the video album had sold in excess of 1 million copies worldwide. In the week ending 27 January 2013, Up All Night: The Live Tour claimed its 30th week on top the Top Music Videos Chart, which is longer than any other title since the chart originated in March 1995. It surpassed Ray Stevens' Comedy Video Classics, which logged 29 weeks on top in 1993–1994. The recording was ultimately certified five times platinum by the Recording Industry Association of America (RIAA) on 29 May 2013, indicating shipments of 500,000 copies.

== Opening acts ==
- Boyce Avenue (United Kingdom & Ireland)
- Camryn (North America, select dates)
- Justice Crew (Australia)
- Matt Lonsdale (United Kingdom & Ireland)
- Annah Mac (New Zealand)
- Manika (North America, select dates)
- Olly Murs (North America, select dates)
- Johnny Ruffo (Australia)

== Setlist ==
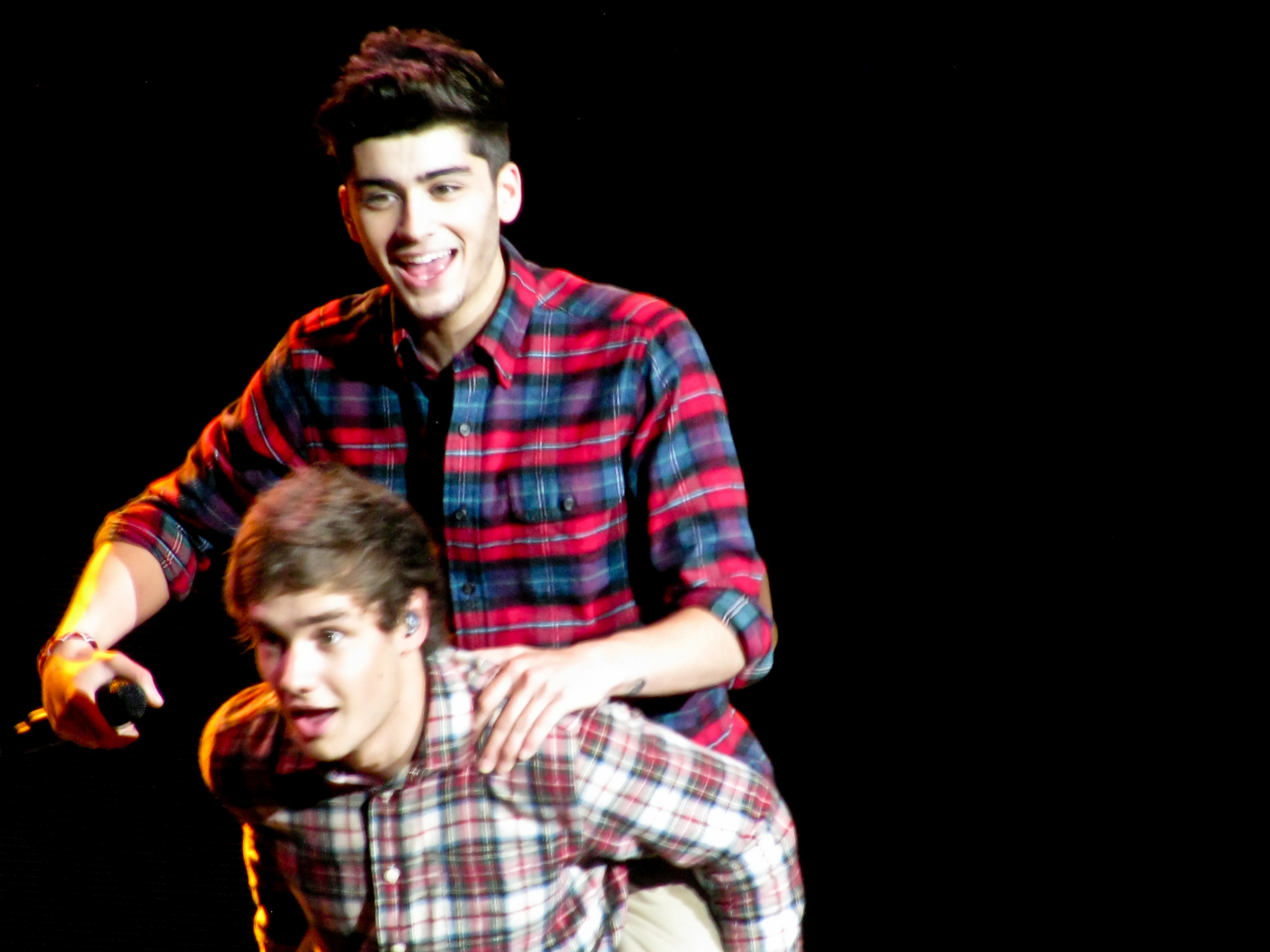
Zayn Malik and Liam Payne on stage in Toronto

1. "Na Na Na"
2. "Stand Up"
3. "I Wish"
4. Medley: "I Gotta Feeling" / "Stereo Hearts" / "Valerie" / "Torn"
5. "Moments"
6. "Gotta Be You"
7. "More than This"
8. "Up All Night"
9. "Tell Me a Lie"
10. "Everything About You"
11. "Use Somebody"
12. "One Thing"
13. "Save You Tonight"
14. "What Makes You Beautiful"

Encore

15. "I Want"

=== Notes ===
- In the medley, Zayn Malik sings "I Gotta Feeling", Niall Horan sings "Stereo Hearts", and Louis Tomlinson sings "Valerie". The group sing "Torn" together.
- During the concert in San Jose, Payne, Malik and Horan performed Drake's "Shot for Me".
- During the concert in Tampa, Horan performed Ed Sheeran's "The A Team".
- During the concert in Duluth, the group performed Michael Jackson's "Man in the Mirror".

== Tour dates ==
List of 2011 concerts
Date	City	Country	Venue
18 December 2011	Watford	England	Watford Colosseum
19 December 2011	Westcliff-on-Sea	England	Cliffs Pavilion
21 December 2011	Wolverhampton	England	Wolverhampton Civic Hall
22 December 2011	Manchester	England	O_{2} Apollo Manchester
23 December 2011	Manchester	England	O_{2} Apollo Manchester

List of 2012 concerts
Date	City	Country	Venue
3 January 2012	Bournemouth	England	Bournemouth International Centre
4 January 2012	Birmingham	England	National Indoor Arena
5 January 2012	Plymouth	England	Plymouth Pavilions
7 January 2012	Nottingham	England	Nottingham Royal Concert Hall
8 January 2012	Brighton	England	Brighton Centre
10 January 2012	London	England	Hammersmith Apollo
11 January 2012	London	England	Hammersmith Apollo
13 January 2012	Glasgow	Scotland	Clyde Auditorium
14 January 2012	Glasgow	Scotland	Clyde Auditorium
15 January 2012	Liverpool	England	Echo Arena Liverpool
17 January 2012	Newcastle	England	Newcastle City Hall
18 January 2012	Blackpool	England	Blackpool Opera House
20 January 2012	Sheffield	England	Sheffield City Hall
21 January 2012	Cardiff	Wales	Motorpoint Arena Cardiff
22 January 2012	London	England	Hammersmith Apollo
24 January 2012	Dublin	Ireland	The O_{2}
25 January 2012	Belfast	Northern Ireland	Waterfront Hall
26 January 2012	Belfast	Northern Ireland	Waterfront Hall
13 April 2012	Sydney	Australia	Hordern Pavilion
16 April 2012	Melbourne	Australia	Hisense Arena
18 April 2012	Brisbane	Australia	BBEC Great Hall
21 April 2012	Henderson	New Zealand	The Trusts Arena
22 April 2012	Wellington	New Zealand	St. James Theatre
22 May 2012	Uncasville	United States	Mohegan Sun Arena
24 May 2012	Fairfax	United States	Patriot Center
25 May 2012	East Rutherford	United States	Izod Center
26 May 2012	New York City	United States	Beacon Theatre
28 May 2012	Camden	United States	Susquehanna Bank Center
29 May 2012	Toronto	Canada	Molson Canadian Amphitheatre
31 May 2012	Toronto	Canada	Molson Canadian Amphitheatre
1 June 2012	Detroit	United States	Fox Theatre
2 June 2012	Rosemont	United States	Allstate Arena
5 June 2012	Mexico City	Mexico	Auditorio Nacional
6 June 2012	Mexico City	Mexico	Auditorio Nacional
8 June 2012	San Diego	United States	Viejas Arena
9 June 2012	Las Vegas	United States	Theatre for the Performing Arts
10 June 2012	Phoenix	United States	Comerica Theatre
13 June 2012	San Jose	United States	Event Center Arena
14 June 2012	Oakland	United States	Paramount Theatre
16 June 2012	Los Angeles	United States	Gibson Amphitheatre
17 June 2012	Anaheim	United States	The Theatre at Honda Center
23 June 2012	Dallas	United States	Gexa Energy Pavilion
24 June 2012	The Woodlands	United States	Cynthia Woods Mitchell Pavilion
26 June 2012	Duluth	United States	Arena at Gwinnett Center
27 June 2012	Charlotte	United States	Time Warner Cable Arena
29 June 2012	Tampa	United States	1-800-ASK-GARY Amphitheatre
30 June 2012	Orlando	United States	Amway Center
1 July 2012	Sunrise	United States	BankAtlantic Center

== Cancelled shows ==
List of cancelled concerts, showing date, city, country, venue and reason for cancellation
Date	City	Country	Venue	Reason
28 May 2012	Upper Darby	United States	Tower Theater	Moved to the Susquehanna Bank Center in Camden, New Jersey

=== Box office score data ===
Venue	City	Tickets sold / available	Gross revenue
Hordern Pavilion	Sydney	6,760 / 6,760 (100%)	$456,887
Hisense Arena	Melbourne	4,775 / 4,775 (100%)	$303,858
Mohegan Sun Arena	Uncasville	5,748 / 5,748 (100%)	$293,706
Patriot Center	Fairfax	8,245 / 8,245 (100%)	$439,504
Beacon Theatre	New York City	5,549 / 5,549 (100%)	$295,348
Molson Canadian Amphitheatre	Toronto	29,611 / 29,611 (100%)	$1,077,420
Auditorio Nacional	Mexico City	18,696 / 18,696 (100%)	$979,461
Event Center Arena	San Jose	5,169 / 5,169 (100%)	$251,122
Arena at Gwinnett Center	Duluth	9,586 / 9,586 (100%)	$502,620
Amway Center	Orlando	12,538 / 12,538 (100%)	$507,536
Total		106,677 / 106,677 (100%)	$5,107,462

== Credits and personnel ==
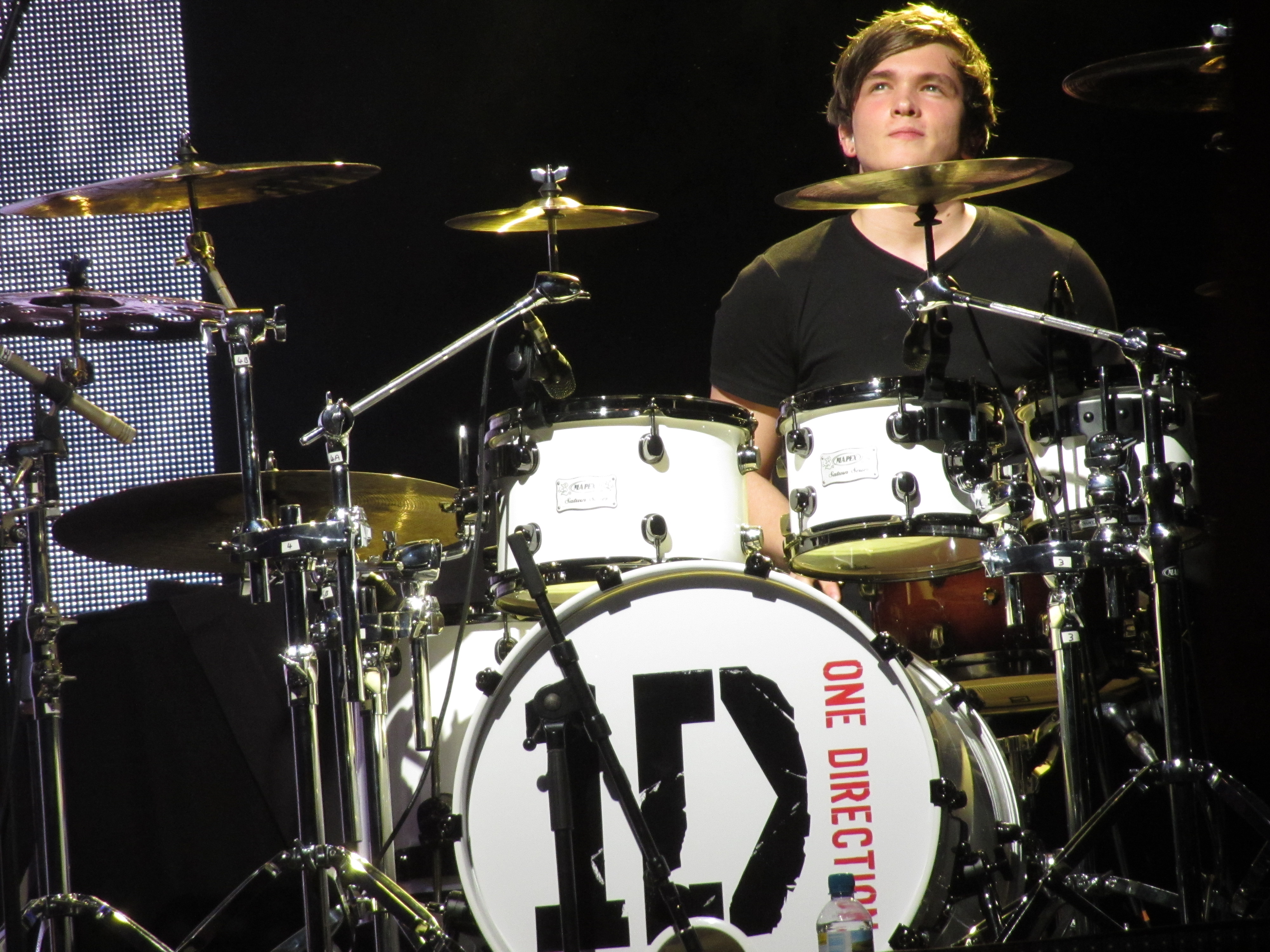
Josh Devine, the drummer on tour

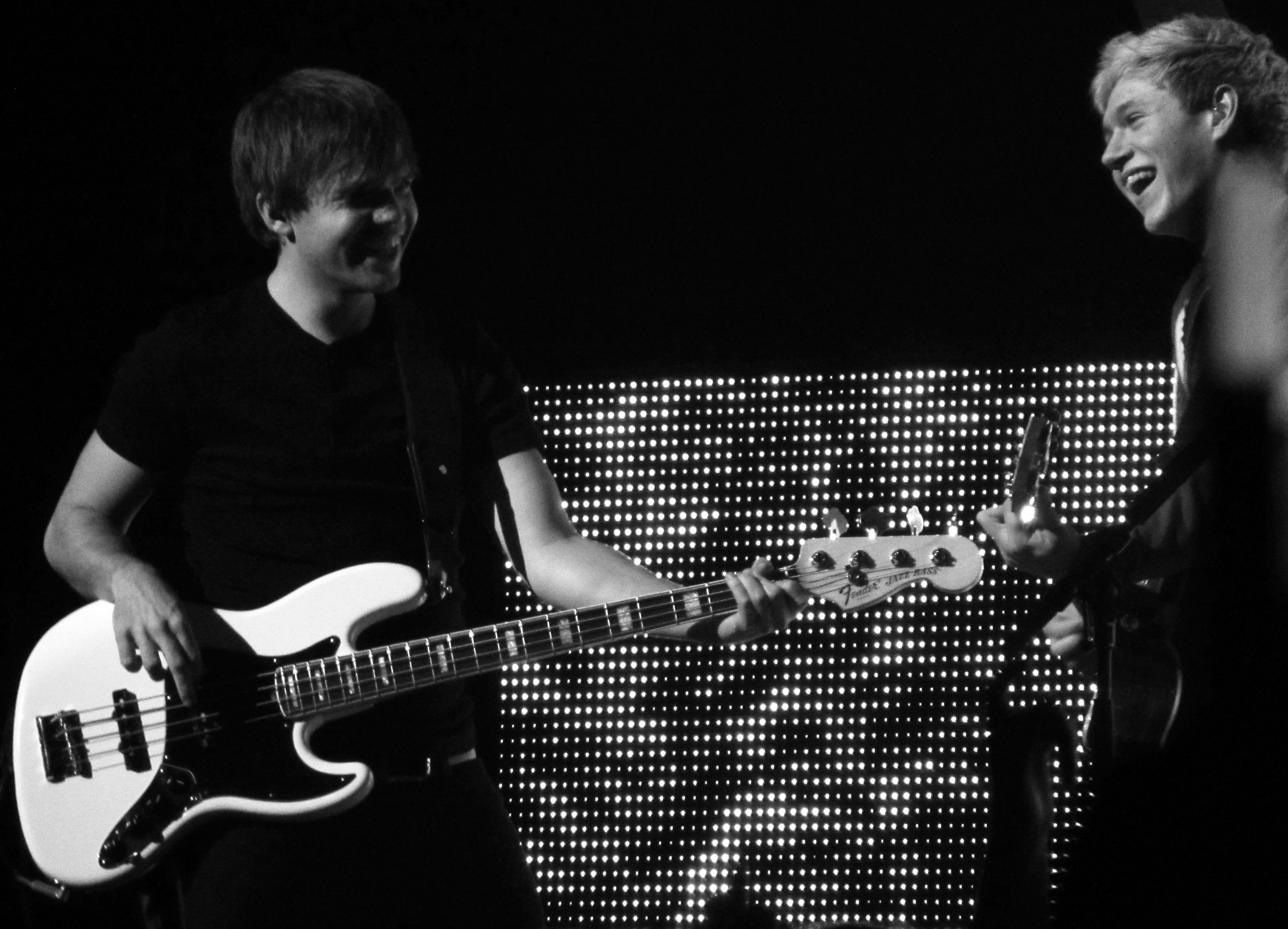
Sandy Beales (left), the bassist on tour

Credits taken and adapted from Official Tour Programme.

One Direction

- Niall Horan – vocals, guitar
- Liam Payne – vocals
- Harry Styles – vocals
- Louis Tomlinson – vocals
- Zayn Malik – vocals

Band

- Jon Shone – musical director, keyboards
- Josh Devine – drums
- Sandy Beales – bass
- Dan Richards – guitar

Crew

- Louise Doyle – show creative director
- Paul Roberts – choreographer
- Helene Horlyck – vocal coach
- Andy Saunders – video director, production
- Tom Bairstow – video production
- Rob Derbyshire – video soundtracks
- Matt English – show graphic designer
- Rob Arbuckle – screen 3D visualisations
- Caroline Watson – costume stylist
- Lydia Taylor – costume assistant
- Crystabel Riley – groomer
- Louise Teasdale – groomer
- Mike Clegg – production manager
- Mil Rakic – stage manager
- Paul Higgins – tour manager
- Namia Miller – security
- Preston Mahon – security
- Jag Chagger – security
- Karen Ringland – band chaperone
- June Jones – tour accountant

Management

- Richard Griffiths
- Harry Magee
- Will Bloomfield
- Chloe Fyffe
