= Tom Grennan discography =

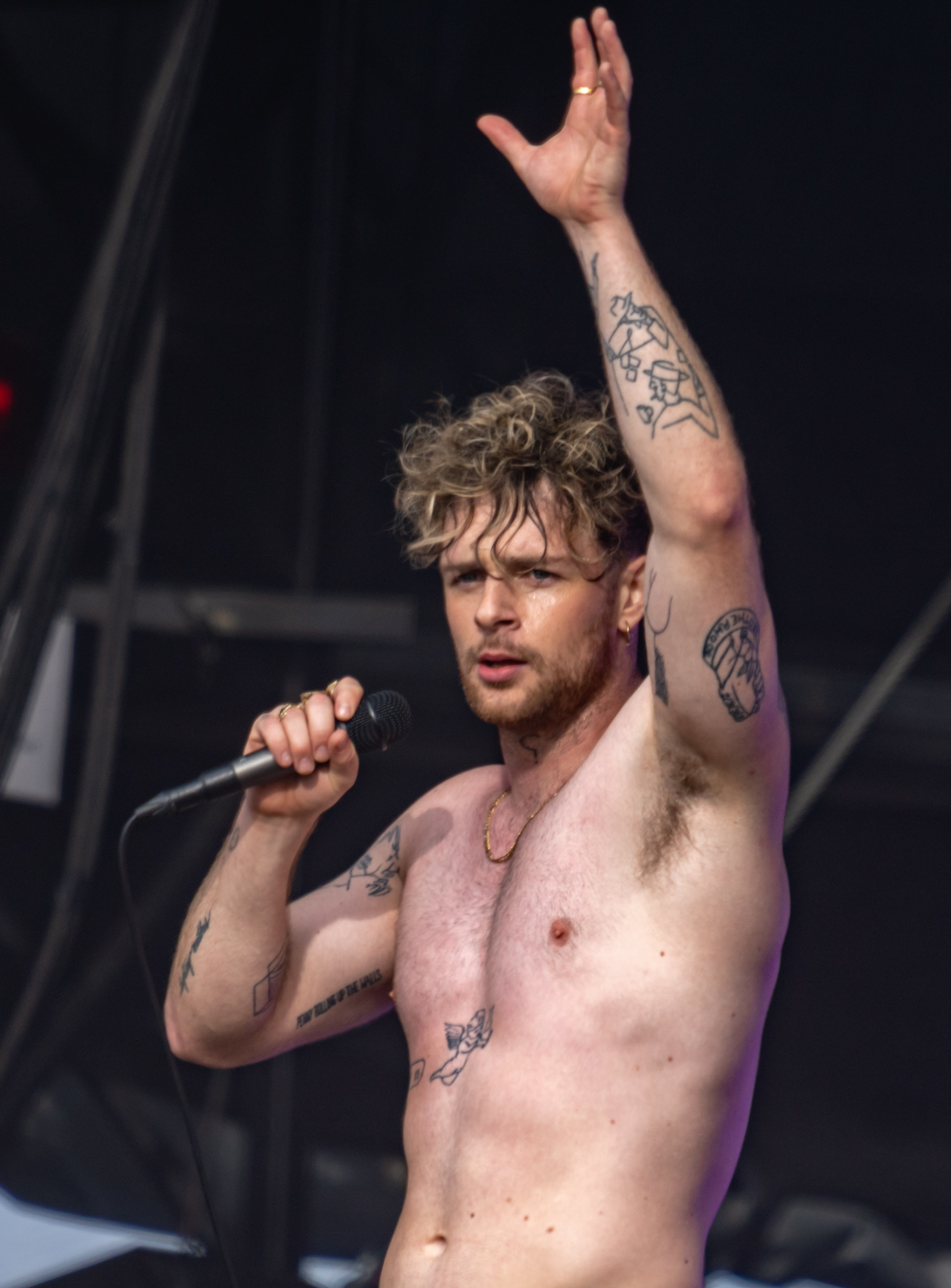
- Studio albums: 4
- EPs: 3
- Singles: 30
- Music videos: 21

English singer and songwriter Tom Grennan has released four studio albums, three EPs, 30 singles, and 21 music videos.

Grennan's debut album, Lighting Matches, was released in July 2018. The album peaked at number five on the UK Albums Chart and includes the single "Found What I've Been Looking For". His second album Evering Road began his breakthrough in the UK, charting at number one on the UK Albums Chart and including the commercially successful singles "This Is the Place", "Little Bit of Love", "Let's Go Home Together" with Ella Henderson and "Don't Break the Heart". In 2021 and 2022, he was also featured as a guest vocalist on the top-ten singles "By Your Side" with Calvin Harris and "Not Over Yet" with KSI. In 2023, Grennan released his third album What Ifs & Maybes, which became his second UK number one album. It included the top-forty singles "Remind Me", "All These Nights" and "Here" plus the top-twenty singles "How Does It Feel" and "Lionheart (Fearless)" with Joel Corry. In 2024, Grennan collaborated with Amazon Music to release an original Christmas single titled "It Can't Be Christmas". The song peaked at number three on the UK Singles Chart, becoming his highest-charting single in the country to date. In 2025, Grennan released his fourth studio album Everywhere I Went, Led Me to Where I Didn't Want to Be, which became Grennan's third consecutive UK number one album, and spawned the release of six singles including "Higher", "Shadowboxing", "Full Attention", "I Won't Miss a Thing", and "Somewhere Only We Go".

== Studio albums ==
Title	Details	Peak chart positions								Certifications
Title	Details	UK	AUS Hit.	BEL (Fl)	FRA	GER	IRE	NLD	SWI	Certifications
Lighting Matches	Released: 6 July 2018; Label: Insanity; Format: CD, LP, digital download	5	—	191	—	60	28	—	36	BPI: Gold
Evering Road	Released: 12 March 2021; Label: Insanity; Format: CD, digital download	1	3	—	111	—	19	50	—	BPI: Gold
What Ifs & Maybes	Released: 16 June 2023; Label: Insanity; Format: CD, digital download	1	—	197	—	—	14	—	—	BPI: Gold
Everywhere I Went, Led Me to Where I Didn't Want to Be	Released: 15 August 2025; Label: Insanity; Format: CD, digital download	1	—	—	—	—	30	—	—	
"—" denotes a recording that did not chart or was not released in that territory.

== Extended plays ==
Title	Details
Something in the Water	Released: 28 October 2016; Label: Insanity; Format: Digital download
Release the Brakes	Released: 10 March 2017; Label: Insanity; Format: Digital download
Found What I've Been Looking for	Released: 28 July 2017; Label: Insanity; Format: Digital download

== Singles ==
=== As lead artist ===
Title	Year	Peak chart positions										Certifications	Album
Title	Year	UK	AUS	AUT	BEL (FL)	FRA	GER	IRE	NLD	POL Air.	SWI	Certifications	Album
"Something In the Water"	2016	—	—	—	—	—	—	—	—	—	—	BPI: Silver	Something in the Water
"Praying"	2017	—	—	—	— (Note: "Praying" charted at number 46 on the Flemish Ultratip chart.)	—	—	—	—	—	—		Release the Brakes
"Found What I've Been Looking For"	2017	82	—	—	—	—	—	99	—	—	—	BPI: Platinum	Found What I've Been Looking for
"Royal Highness"	2017	—	—	—	—	—	—	—	—	—	—		Lighting Matches
"I Might"	2017	—	—	—	—	—	—	—	—	—	—		Lighting Matches
"Wishing on a Star"	2018	—	—	—	—	—	—	—	—	—	—		Non-album single
"Sober"	2018	—	—	—	—	—	—	—	—	—	—		Lighting Matches
"Barbed Wire"	2018	—	—	—	—	—	—	—	—	—	—		Lighting Matches
"Run in the Rain"	2018	—	—	—	—	—	—	—	—	—	—		Lighting Matches
"This Is the Place"	2020	73	—	—	—	—	—	—	—	—	—	BPI: Silver	Evering Road
"Oh Please"	2020	—	—	—	—	—	—	—	—	—	—		Evering Road
"Amen"	2020	—	—	—	—	—	—	—	—	—	—		Evering Road
"Little Bit of Love"	2021	7	16	21	7	58	53	6	14	2	28	BPI: 2× Platinum; ARIA: Platinum; BVMI: Gold; IFPI AUT: Platinum; IFPI SWI: Platinum; NVPI: Platinum; ZPAV: Platinum	Evering Road
"Let's Go Home Together" (Note: "Let's Go Home Together" also features on Ella Henderson's second studio album Everything I Didn’t Say.) (with Ella Henderson)	2021	10	—	—	—	—	—	11	—	—	—	BPI: 2× Platinum	Evering Road
"Don't Break the Heart"	2021	49	—	—	38	—	—	100	54	5	—	BPI: Gold; NVPI: Gold; ZPAV: Gold	Evering Road
"Remind Me"	2022	27	—	—	28	—	—	21	— (Note: "Remind Me" did not enter the Dutch Top 100 Singles chart, but peaked at number six on the Dutch Single Tip chart.)	13	—	BPI: Platinum; ZPAV: Gold	What Ifs & Maybes
"All These Nights"	2022	37	—	—	36	—	—	—	— (Note: "All These Nights" did not enter the Dutch Top 100 Singles chart, but peaked at number 22 on the Dutch Single Tip chart.)	—	—	BPI: Silver	What Ifs & Maybes
"Lionheart (Fearless)" (with Joel Corry) (Note: "Lionheart (Fearless)" also features on Joel Corry's debut compilation album Another Friday Night.)	2022	18	—	—	20	—	—	30	35	2	—	BPI: Platinum; ZPAV: Gold	What Ifs & Maybes
"Driving Home for Christmas"	2022	—	—	—	—	—	—	—	—	—	—		Non-album single
"You Are Not Alone"	2022	— (Note: "You Are Not Alone" did not enter the Official UK Top 100 Chart, but peaked at number 83 on the Official Singles Downloads Chart Top 100.)	—	—	—	—	—	—	—	—	—		What Ifs & Maybes
"Here"	2023	31	—	—	—	—	—	55	—	—	—	BPI: Silver	What Ifs & Maybes
"How Does It Feel"	2023	17	—	—	—	—	—	21	—	90	—	BPI: Gold	What Ifs & Maybes
"Higher"	2024	78	—	—	—	—	—	—	—	40	—		Everywhere I Went, Led Me to Where I Didn't Want to Be
"It Can't Be Christmas"	2024	3	—	—	—	—	—	59	—	—	—	BPI: Silver	Non-album single
"Shadowboxing"	2025	— (Note: "Shadowboxing" did not enter the Official UK Top 100 Chart, but peaked at number 56 on the Official Singles Downloads Chart Top 100.)	—	—	—	—	—	—	—	—	—		Everywhere I Went, Led Me to Where I Didn't Want to Be
"Boys Don't Cry"	2025	— (Note: "Boys Don't Cry" did not enter the Official UK Top 100 Chart, but peaked at number 49 on the Official Singles Downloads Chart Top 100.)	—	—	—	—	—	—	—	—	—		Everywhere I Went, Led Me to Where I Didn't Want to Be
"Full Attention"	2025	— (Note: "Full Attention" did not enter the Official UK Top 100 Chart, but peaked at number 33 on the Official Singles Downloads Chart Top 100.)	—	—	—	—	—	—	—	—	—		Everywhere I Went, Led Me to Where I Didn't Want to Be
"I Won't Miss a Thing"	2025	—	—	—	—	—	—	—	—	—	—		Everywhere I Went, Led Me to Where I Didn't Want to Be
"Somewhere Only We Go"	2025	—	—	—	—	—	—	—	—	—	—		Everywhere I Went, Led Me to Where I Didn't Want to Be
"Forever" (with Illenium and Alna)	2025	—	—	—	—	—	—	—	—	—	—		Non-album single
"Wrapped in Gold"	2026	—	—	—	—	—	—	—	—	—	—		TBA
"—" denotes a recording that did not chart or was not released in that territory.

=== As featured artist ===
Title	Year	Peak chart positions								Certifications	Album
Title	Year	UK	BEL (FL)	BEL (WA)	CRO Int. Air.	FRA	NLD	SWE	SWI	Certifications	Album
"All Goes Wrong" (Chase & Status featuring Tom Grennan)	2016	65	— (Note: "All Goes Wrong" charted at number 3 on the Flemish Ultratip chart.)	— (Note: "All Goes Wrong" charted at number 47 on the Walloon Ultratip chart.)	—	—	—	—	—	BPI: Platinum; ARIA: Gold	Tribe
"Bridge over Troubled Water" (as part of Artists for Grenfell)	2017	1	—	—	—	—	—	—	—	BPI: Gold	Non-album single
"By Your Side" (Calvin Harris featuring Tom Grennan)	2021	9	23	19	6	90	24	42	73	BPI: Platinum; NVPI: Gold	Evering Road (Special Edition) and 96 Months
"Not Over Yet" (KSI featuring Tom Grennan)	2022	4	—	—	—	—	— (Note: "Not Over Yet" did not enter the Dutch Single Top 100, but peaked at number 27 on the Single Tip chart.)	— (Note: "Not Over Yet" did not enter the Swedish Singellista Chart, but peaked at number five on the Swedish Heatseeker Chart.)	—	BPI: Platinum	What Ifs & Maybes
"—" denotes a recording that did not chart or was not released in that territory.

== Other charted songs ==
Title	Year	Peak chart positions	Certifications	Album
Title	Year	UK	Certifications	Album
"Memory Lane" (Bugzy Malone featuring Tom Grennan)	2017	65	BPI: Gold	King of the North

== Guest appearances ==
Title	Year	Artist(s)	Album
"Home"	2015	The New Blxck	The Night Is Dark and I'm Far from Home
"Footsteps"	2016	Kojey Radical	23Winters
"Memory Lane"	2017	Bugzy Malone	King of the North
"Coming Back to You"	2018	Naya	Ruby
"Do We Really Care? Pt. 1"	2020	Future Utopia, Tia Carys	12 Questions

== Other releases ==
Title	Year
"City of Stars" (Note: Cover of the La La Land (2016) song (originally performed by Ryan Gosling and Emma Stone), recorded and released as part of O2's Priority campaign in July 2019.)	2019
"The Best A Man Can Get (Gillette)" (Note: Recorded and released as part of Gillette's 2024 campaign.)	2024

== Songwriting credits ==
Song	Year	Artist	Album
"Run Away With Me" (featuring Manu Lanvin)	2021	The Avener	Heaven
"Starlight"	2021	Westlife	Wild Dreams
"Everything but You" (featuring A7S)	2022	Clean Bandit	Non-album single
"Living Without You" (with David Guetta and Sam Ryder)	2022	Sigala	Every Cloud and There's Nothing but Space, Man!
"Best Day of Our Lives"	2024	DearALICE	Made in Korea: The K-Pop Experience (Original TV Soundtrack)

== Music videos ==
Title	Year	Director
"All Goes Wrong" (Chase & Status featuring Tom Grennan)	2016	Unknown
"Sweet Hallelujah" (Official Live Session)	2016	Unknown
"Praying"	2017	Unknown
"Found What I've Been Looking For"	2017	Unknown
"Royal Highness"	2017	Unknown
"Bridge over Troubled Water" (as part of Artists for Grenfell)	2017	Unknown
"Sober"	2018	Unknown
"Barbed Wire"	2018	Unknown
"Run In the Rain"	2018	Unknown
"This Is the Place	2020	Unknown
"Oh Please"	2020	Unknown
"Amen"	2020	KC Locke
"Little Bit of Love"	2021	Keane Pearce Shaw
"Let's Go Home Together" (with Ella Henderson)	2021	Unknown
"By Your Side" (Calvin Harris featuring Tom Grennan)	2021	Unknown
"Don't Break My Heart"	2021	Unknown
"Remind Me"	2022	KC Locke
"All These Nights"	2022	Unknown
"Not Over Yet" (KSI featuring Tom Grennan)	2022	Troy Roscoe
"Lionheart (Fearless)" (with Joel Corry)	2022	Elliot Simpson
"Here"	2023	Unknown
"How Does It Feel"	2023	Unknown
"Full Attention"	2025	ABCDCD
