= Somewhere Only We Go =

Single by Tom Grennan

from the album Everywhere I Went, Led Me to Where I Didn't Want to Be
- Released: 1 August 2025
- Length: 2:59
- Label: Insanity
- Songwriters: Tom Grennan; Charlie Martin; Tom Mann
- Producers: Dan Priddy; Mark Crew; The Nocturns

Tom Grennan singles chronology
"I Won't Miss a Thing" (2025)	"Somewhere Only We Go" (2025)	"Forever" (2025)

Visualizer
- "Somewhere Only We Go" on YouTube

"Somewhere Only We Go" is a song by English singer-songwriter Tom Grennan. It was released on 1 August 2025, through Insanity Records under exclusive licence to Sony Music UK, as the sixth single from his fourth studio album Everywhere I Went, Led Me to Where I Didn't Want to Be (2025).

== Background and release ==
"Somewhere Only We Go" was written by Tom Grennan in collaboration with Charlie Martin, and Tom Mann, and it was produced by Dan Priddy, along with Mark Crew, and The Nocturns. "Somewhere Only We Go" appears as the fifth track on Everywhere I Went, Led Me to Where I Didn't Want to Be.

Upon the song's release, Grennan issued the following statement in the official press release for the single:

“Somewhere Only We Go” is a reflection on how people change, drift, and grow apart—sometimes for the right reasons, sometimes for the wrong ones. But no matter how much time passes, there are always moments, memories, and places that tie us to who we once were. This song is about honouring those connections, even when life moves on—because in the end, it moves too fast to leave the important things unsaid.”

— Grennan explaining the meaning of the track, via TotalEntertainment

== Track listing ==
- Digital download and streaming
1. "Somewhere Only We Go" – 2:59
- Digital download and streaming – Spotify
1. "Somewhere Only We Go" – 2:59
2. "I Won't Miss a Thing" – 3:54
3. "Full Attention" – 3:04
4. "Boys Don't Cry" – 2:42
5. "Shadowboxing" – 2:52
6. "Higher" – 3:21

== Personnel ==
Credits adapted from Apple Music.

- Tom Grennan — vocals, songwriter
- Charlie Martin — songwriter, producer, programming, keyboards, guitar, synthesizer
- Tom Mann — songwriter
- Dan Priddy — producer, programming, keyboards, drums, guitar
- Reuben Priddy — guitar
- Mark Crew — producer, programming, keyboards
- The Nocturns — producer
- Dan Grech-Marguerat — mixing engineer
- Luke Burgoyne — assistant mixing engineer
- Seb Maletka-Catala — assistant mixing engineer
- Chris Gehringer — mastering engineer
- Will Quinnell — assistant mastering engineer
- Atharva Dhekne — assistant mastering engineer

== Charts ==
Chart performance for "Somewhere Only We Go"
Chart (2026)	Peak position
Czech Republic Airplay (ČNS IFPI)	14

== Release history ==
Release dates, formats and versions of "Somewhere Only We Go"
Region	Date	Format	Label	Ref.
Various	1 August 2025	Digital download; streaming	Insanity; Sony UK	
