= I Won't Miss a Thing =

Single by Tom Grennan

from the album Everywhere I Went, Led Me to Where I Didn't Want to Be
- Released: 4 July 2025
- Length: 3:54
- Label: Insanity
- Songwriters: Tom Grennan; Connor McDonough; Riley McDonough; Toby McDonough; Ryan Daly; Castle; Mike Needle
- Producers: Connor McDonough; Riley McDonough; Ryan Daly

Tom Grennan singles chronology
"Full Attention" (2015)	"I Won't Miss a Thing" (2025)	"Somewhere Only We Go" (2025)

Visualizer
- "I Won't Miss a Thing" on YouTube

"I Won't Miss a Thing" is a song by English singer-songwriter Tom Grennan. It was released on 4 July 2025, through Insanity Records under exclusive licence to Sony Music UK, as the fifth single from his fourth studio album Everywhere I Went, Led Me to Where I Didn't Want to Be (2025).

== Background and release ==
"I Won't Miss a Thing" was written by Tom Grennan in collaboration with Castle, Mike Needle, Ryan Daly, and members of the band Before You Exit: Connor, Riley, and Toby McDonough. The track was produced by Ryan Daly, along with Connor and Riley McDonough. "I Won't Miss a Thing" appears as the fourteenth track on Everywhere I Went, Led Me to Where I Didn't Want to Be. The song was inspired by Grennan’s grandfather, whose health was in a critical condition at the time.

Upon the song's release, Grennan issued the following statement in the official press release for the single:

"I wrote this song during one of the most difficult times in my family’s life— while my grandad was fighting for his life. In those moments, everything slows down, and the things that really matter come into focus. It became clear to me that love, memories, and the bond we shared were things that death could never take away. Luckily my grandad fought hard and survived to hear the song and thankfully loves it.

"I Won't Miss a Thing" is my way of holding on to every laugh, every story, every quiet moment we had. It’s about the beauty in the circle of life about learning to let go while still feeling someone with you, guiding you, protecting you, even after they’re gone.

This song is for anyone who’s loved deeply and lost someone close. I hope it reminds you that they never really leave us — they just find a different way to stay close."

— Grennan on the song backstory, via Clash Magazine

== Track listing ==
- Digital download and streaming
1. "I Won't Miss a Thing" – 3:54
- Digital download and streaming – Spotify
1. "I Won't Miss a Thing" – 3:54
2. "Full Attention" – 3:04
3. "Boys Don't Cry" – 2:42
4. "Shadowboxing" – 2:52
5. "Higher" – 3:21

== Personnel ==
Credits adapted from Apple Music.

- Tom Grennan — vocals, background vocals, songwriter
- Connor McDonough — songwriter, producer, recording engineer, vocal recording engineer, all instruments
- Riley McDonough — songwriter, producer, recording engineer, vocal recording engineer, all instruments
- Toby McDonough — songwriter, background vocals
- Mike Needle — songwriter, background vocals
- Castle — songwriter, background vocals
- Ryan Daly — songwriter, producer, recording engineer, vocal recording engineer, background vocals, all instruments
- Dan Grech-Marguerat — mixing engineer, programming
- Luke Burgoyne — assistant mixing engineer
- Seb Maletka-Catala — assistant mixing engineer
- Chris Gehringer — mastering engineer
- Will Quinnell — assistant mastering engineer
- Atharva Dhekne — assistant mastering engineer

== Release history ==
Release dates, formats and versions of "I Won't Miss a Thing"
Region	Date	Format	Label	Ref.
Various	4 July 2025	Digital download; streaming	Insanity; Sony UK	
