= Peter Rycroft =

British songwriter and producer

Lostboy
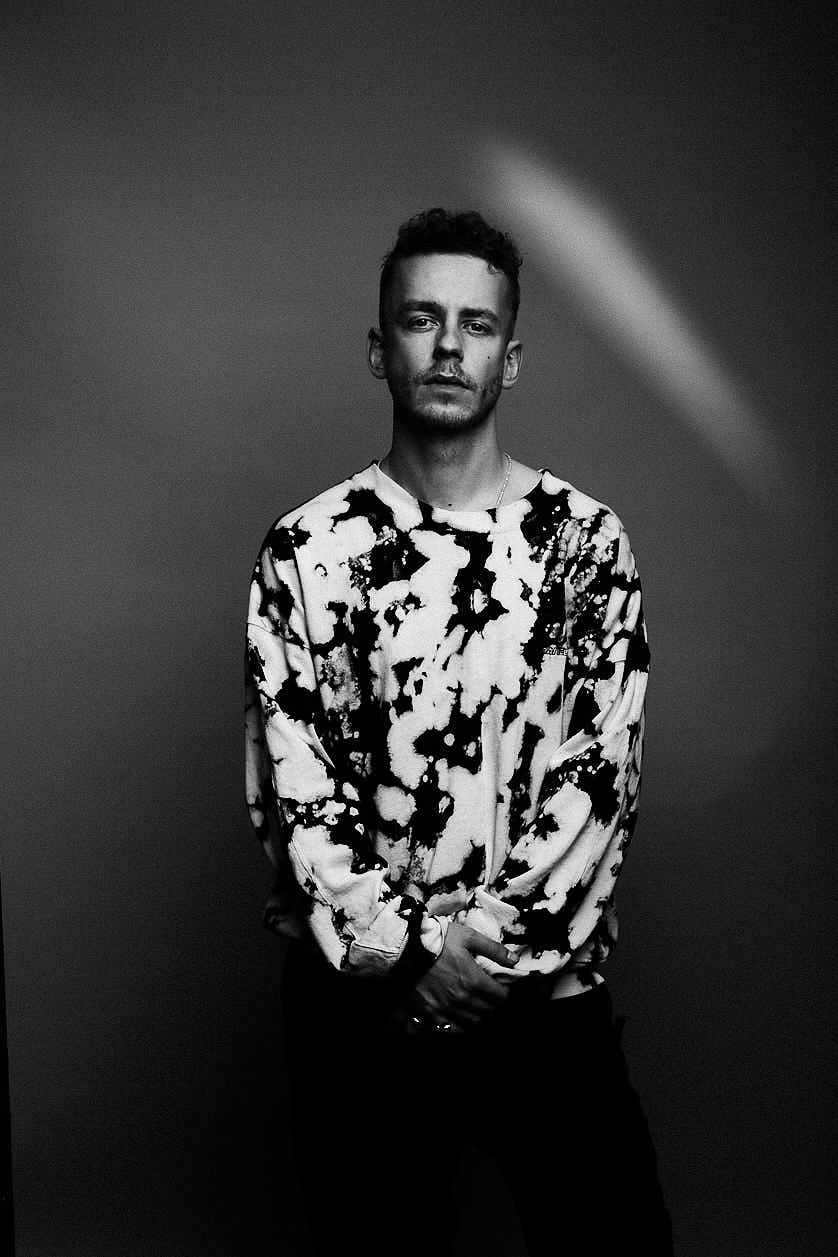

Background information
- Born: Peter John Rees Rycroft; October 1993 (age 32); London, England
- Genres: Pop; dance-pop
- Occupations: Songwriter, record producer
- Years active: 2016–present
- Website: areyoulostboy.com

Peter Rycroft (born October 1993), known professionally as Lostboy, is a British songwriter and music producer. Active in the music fields since 2010s, he has written and produced music across multiple genres, working with Tiësto, Rita Ora, Ellie Goulding, Lewis Capaldi, Anne-Marie, Little Mix, Zedd and Ava Max. In 2023, he co-wrote Calvin Harris and Ellie Goulding's single "Miracle" which spent 8 weeks at No.1 in the UK, and produced and co-wrote Kylie Minogue's 2023 hit single "Padam Padam", for which he won the Grammy Award for Best Pop Dance Recording.

== Early life ==
Peter Rycroft began piano lessons at age six, then took drum lessons and joined several bands during high school. Originally planning to enroll at the Liverpool Institute for the Performing Arts to study song production, Rycroft took a gap year to tour with The Laurence Jones Band, and realised that he wanted to write songs. Inspired by Peter Pan, with whom he shares a given name, Rycroft began working under pseudonym Lostboy.

== Career ==
Fraser T. Smith got ahold of Lostboy's demo, and invited him to do additional production on songs for Anne-Marie and Gavin James. Lostboy soon began to work with an array of UK artists, writing and producing songs for Becky Hill, and producing 2019 single "Losing Me" for Gabrielle Aplin. Lostboy went on to co-write Zedd and Kehlani's 2019 single "Good Thing", to co-write with Lewis Capaldi Rita Ora's 2020 single "How to Be Lonely", to co-produce with Tiësto his and Ava Max's 2021 single "The Motto", and co-write and co-produce "Hate You" from Jung Kook's debut solo album "Golden", among others.

In 2022, Lostboy signed a global publishing deal with Sony Music Publishing UK.

In 2023, Lostboy co-wrote with Ina Wroldsen Kylie Minogue's hit single "Padam Padam" which he also produced. He also co-wrote and produced the song "Rise" by Freya Ridings for the teen comedy film Ruby Gillman, Teenage Kraken. The single is Minogue's first to break into the UK top 10 since 2011, and her first ever to chart on the Billboard Hot Dance / Electronic Song list, peaking at Number 10.

In 2023, Lostboy won Songwriter of the Year at the 2023 Music Business Worldwide A&R Awards.

== Production discography ==
Peter Rycroft's works include:

Year	Title	Artist	Album	Songwriter	Producer
2016	"Liability"	Kloe	Non-album single	check	check
2017	"Becoming"	Jones	Acoustic		check
2017	"Call Me Out"	Sarah Close	Caught Up		check
2017	"Caught Up"	Sarah Close	Caught Up		check
2017	"When the Time's Right"	L Devine	Growing Pains		check
2017	"Ultra Love"	Marlon Roudette	Non-album single		check
2017	"Waking Up Slow"	Gabrielle Aplin	Avalon	check	check
2018	"Daughter"	L Devine	Peer Pressure		check
2018	"Drink 2 U"	Jack Vallier	Anyway	check	check
2018	"Frozen Frames"	Hannah Jane Lewis	Non-album single		check
2018	"Revival" (featuring Cheat Codes and Max)	Sigala	Brighter Days	check	
2018	"Sunrise in the East"	Becky Hill	Get to Know	check	check
2018	"Used to Love You"	Anne-Marie	Speak Your Mind		check
2018	"Why Does It Hurt"	JHart	Non-album single	check	check
2018	"Wonderland" (featuring Jimi Tents)	Maad	Technicolor		check
2019	"Empire"	Nina Nesbitt	The Sun Will Come Up, the Seasons Will Change		check
2019	"Chloe"	Nina Nesbitt	The Sun Will Come Up, the Seasons Will Change	check	check
2019	"Things I Say When You Sleep"	Nina Nesbitt	The Sun Will Come Up, the Seasons Will Change		check
2019	"Last December"	Nina Nesbitt	The Sun Will Come Up, the Seasons Will Change		check
2019	"The Sun Will Come Up, the Seasons Will Change"	Nina Nesbitt	The Sun Will Come Up, the Seasons Will Change		check
2019	"Critical"	Sam Tompkins	From My Sleeve to the World	check	check
2019	"Deep Sea Diving" (featuring Emir Taha)	Aboutagirl	Non-album singles	check	
2019	"Every Time You're High"	Billy Lockett	Non-album singles		check
2019	"First Time" (featuring Robinson)	Grey	Non-album singles	check	check
2019	"Good Thing"	Zedd and Kehlani	Non-album singles	check	check
2019	"If Looks Could Kill"	Lauren Aquilina	Non-album singles	check	check
2019	"Look No Further"	Flawes	Highlights		check
2019	"No Good for My Soul"	Flawes	Highlights		check
2019	"When We Were Young"	Flawes	Highlights		check
2019	"Here to Stay"	Flawes	Highlights	check	check
2019	"Still Not Ready"	Flawes	Highlights		check
2019	"Would You Mind If" (featuring Sad Alex)	Flawes	Highlights		check
2019	"Outro"	Flawes	Highlights		check
2019	"Number One"	Flawes	Highlights		check
2019	"Turn Back Around"	Flawes	Highlights		check
2019	"I'm Letting Go"	Flawes	Highlights	check	check
2019	"Moonwalking"	Good Scott	Fka Fyko		check
2019	"Woozy"	Good Scott	Fka Fyko		check
2019	"Not Yours Never Was"	Hannah James Lewis	Hannah James Lewis		check
2019	"Rivers"	King Calaway	Rivers		check
2019	"Unbelievable"	Why Don't We	Non-album single	check	check
2020	"10 Months"	Enhypen	Border: Day One	check	check
2020	"Bad People"	Lauren Aquilina	Non-album single		check
2020	"Better"	The Vamps	Cherry Blossom	check	check
2020	"Married in Vegas"	The Vamps	Cherry Blossom	check	check
2020	"Chemicals"	The Vamps	Cherry Blossom	check	check
2020	"Part of Me"	The Vamps	Cherry Blossom	check	check
2020	"Nothing But You"	The Vamps	Cherry Blossom	check	check
2020	"B-List"	Aboutagirl	Non-album single	check	check
2020	"Gloves Up"	Little Mix	Confetti	check	check
2020	"How to Be Lonely"	Rita Ora	Non-album single	check	check
2020	"Until the Sun Comes Up"	Gabrielle Aplin	Dear Happy	check	check
2020	"Strange"	Gabrielle Aplin	Dear Happy	check	check
2020	"Like You Say You Do"	Gabrielle Aplin	Dear Happy	check	check
2020	"Losing Me" (featuring JP Cooper)	Gabrielle Aplin	Dear Happy		check
2020	"So Far So Good"	Gabrielle Aplin	Dear Happy	check	check
2020	"Nothing Really Matters"	Gabrielle Aplin	Dear Happy		check
2020	"Mayday"	Victon	Mayday	check	check
2020	"New Me"	Ella Eyre	Quarter Life Crisis	check	check
2020	"Staying in Love"	Kasbo	The Making of a Paracosm	check	
2020	"You Take The Fun Out of Everything"	Love Fame Tragedy	Wherever I Go, I Want to Leave	check	check
2021	"LMLY"	Jackson Wang	LMLY	check	check
2021	"100 Ways"	Jackson Wang	LMLY	check	check
2021	"Begging"	Billy Lockett	Reflections	check	check
2021	"Better Mistakes"	Bebe Rexha	Better Mistakes	check	check
2021	"Sacrifice"	Bebe Rexha	Better Mistakes	check	
2021	"Black Hole"	Griff	One Foot in Front of the Other	check	check
2021	"C'est La Vie"	Claudia Valentina	Non-album single	check	check
2021	"Cut You Off"	Little Mix	Between Us	check	check
2021	"Eleven"	Ive	Eleven	check	check
2021	"Last Time"	Becky Hill	Only Honest on the Weekend	check	check
2021	"Let It Ring"	Reiley	Non-album single	check	check
2021	"You"	Reiley	BRB, Having an Identity Crisis		check
2021	"Something Better"	Tom Grennan	Evering Road	check	check
2021	"Little Bit of Love"	Tom Grennan	Evering Road	check	check
2021	"Lonely In Love"	Mimi Webb	Seven Shades of Heartbreak	check	check
2021	"Postcard"	JLS	2.0	check	check
2021	"Psycho"	Lauren Aquilina	Ghost World		check
2021	"Tobacco in My Sheets"	Lauren Aquilina	Ghost World		check
2021	"Something Stupid"	Jonas Blue and Awa	Together	check	
2021	"Starlight"	Westlife	Wild Dreams	check	check
2021	"Start Walking"	Tove Styrke	Hard	check	check
2021	"Testosterone"	Grace Davies	I Wonder If You Wonder	check	check
2021	"x2"	Anne-Marie	Therapy	check	check
2022	"10:35" (featuring Tate McRae)	Tiësto	Drive	check	check
2022	"Follow Me"	Rina Sawayama & Pabllo Vittar	Non-album single	check	check
2022	"Friends with My Exes" (featuring Joel Adams)	Sam DeRosa	The Good Parts	check	check
2022	"Hate Being Human"	Chris Brown	Breezy	check	check
2022	"Hello"(featuring Chlöe and KayCyy)	Fivio Foreign	B.I.B.L.E.	check	
2022	"Love Phobia"	Onew	Dice	check	check
2022	"One Heart"	Twinnie	Welcome to the Club	check	
2022	"Questions"	Lost Frequencies and James Arthur	All Stand Together	check	
2022	"Say Something"	James TW	Heartbeat Changes	check	check
2022	"Sweat"	Claudia Valentina	Non-album singles	check	check
2023	"Back Home for Christmas"	Mimi Webb	Non-album singles	check	check
2023	"Both of Us"	Mimi Webb	Amelia	check	check
2023	"Remind You"	Mimi Webb	Amelia	check	check
2023	"Remind Me"	Tom Grennan	What Ifs & Maybes	check	check
2023	"Here"	Tom Grennan	What Ifs & Maybes		check
2023	"Before You"	Tom Grennan	What Ifs & Maybes	check	check
2023	"Bla Bla Bla"	Måneskin	Rush!	check	
2023	"Dancing In a Hurricane"	Freya Ridings	Blood Orange	check	check
2023	"Rise"	Freya Ridings	Ruby Gillman, Teenage Kraken	check	check
2023	"Million Dollar Baby"	Ava Max	Diamonds & Dancefloors	check	check
2023	"Dancing's Done"	Ava Max	Diamonds & Dancefloors	check	check
2023	"Hallelujah"	Rosa Linn	Lay Your Hands Upon My Heart	check	check
2023	"Hate You"	Jung Kook	Golden	check	check
2023	"Holy Moly"	Ive	I've Mine	check	check
2023	"I'm My Only Friend"	Dillon Francis and Arden Jones	This Mixtape is Fire Too	check	
2023	"Leave Me for Dead"	Gayle	Hello This Is the Setlist for My Tour	check	check
2023	"Let It Die"	Ellie Goulding	Higher Than Heaven	check	check
2023	"Messy"	Reneé Rapp	Snow Angel	check	
2023	"Miracle"	Calvin Harris and Ellie Goulding	96 Months	check	
2023	"My Bad"	The Chainsmokers and Shenseea	Summertime Friends	check	check
2023	"My Stupid Heart"	Walk off the Earth	Stand By You	check	
2023	"Opposite"	Sabrina Carpenter	Emails I Can't Send	check	check
2023	"Padam Padam"	Kylie Minogue	Tension	check	check
2023	"Personal Pornstar"	Bludnymph	Drool	check	
2023	"Secondhand Happiness"	Sam Fischer	I Love You, Please Don't Hate Me	check	check
2023	"Self-Portrait"	Talia Mar	Non-album singles	check	check
2023	"That Kind of Woman"	The Scarlet Opera	Non-album singles	check	check
2023	"The Motto" (featuring Ava Max)	Tiësto	Drive	check	check
2023	"Wallflower"	Twice	Ready to Be	check	check
2023	"Won't Forget You" (featuring Ina Worldsen)	Jax Jones and D.O.D.	Non-album single	check	
2024	"15 Minutes"	Madison Beer	Non-album single	check	check
2024	"Miss Me Too"	Griff	Vertigo	check	check
2024	"Into the Walls"	Griff	Vertigo	check	check
2024	"19th Hour"	Griff	Vertigo	check	check
2024	"Hole in My Pocket"	Griff	Vertigo	check	check
2024	"So Fast"	Griff	Vertigo	check	check
2024	"Where Did You Go"	Griff	Vertigo	check	check
2024	"One Night"	Griff	Vertigo	check	check
2024	"Colder"	St. Paul	Non-album single	check	check
2024	"Freaking Out"	Billy Lockett	Abington Grove		check
2024	"Heartbreak in Heaven" (featuring Peniel of BtoB)	Tzuyu	Aboutzu	check	check
2024	"Same Road"	Arlissa	Non-album single	check	
2024	"Trash"	BGYO	BGYO	check	check
2024	"2 Hands"	Tate McRae	So Close to What	check	check
2025	"Signs"	Tate McRae	So Close to What	check	check
2025	"No I'm Not in Love"	Tate McRae	So Close to What	check	check
2025	"Ash"	Le Sserafim	Hot	check	check
2025	"FUFN (Fuck You for Now)"	Jade	That's Showbiz Baby	check	check
2025	"It Girl"	Jade	That's Showbiz Baby		check
2025	"Natural Disaster"	Jade	That's Showbiz Baby	check	check
2025	"Glitch"	Jade	That's Showbiz Baby		check
2025	"Paradise"	Maymay Entrata	Non-album single	check	check
2025	"Someone for Me"	Kylie Minogue	Tension II	check	check
2025	"Who's Making You Feel It"	Cian Ducrot	Little Dreaming	check	check
2025	"Messy"	Rosé	F1 the Album	check	check
2025	"All At Once"	Madison Beer	F1 the Album	check	check
2025	"Yes Baby"	Madison Beer	Locket	check	
2025	"Ponytail"	XO	Fashionably Late	check	check
2025	"This Is What We Dance For"	Jade	That's Showbiz Baby The Encore	check	check
2026	"Odd" (Gaeul solo)	Ive	Revive+	check	check

== Awards and nominations ==
Award Show	Year	Category	Work	Result	Ref(s)
Music Business Worldwide A&R Awards	2022	Producer of the Year	(Various)	Nominated	
Music Business Worldwide A&R Awards	2022	Song of the Year	"Remind Me" (Tom Grennan)	Nominated	
Music Business Worldwide A&R Awards	2023	Producer of the Year	(Various)	Nominated	
Music Business Worldwide A&R Awards	2023	Song of The Year	"Miracle" (Calvin Harris & Ellie Goulding)	Nominated	
Music Business Worldwide A&R Awards	2023	Songwriter of The Year	(Various)	Won	
Grammy Awards	2024	Best Pop Dance Recording	"Padam Padam" (Kylie Minogue)	Won	
ASCAP Awards	2024	Songwriter off The Year	(Various)	Won	
