= Shadowboxing (disambiguation) =

Shadowboxing is an exercise used in the training for combat sports. Shadowboxing is sometimes an alternative translation for the Chinese martial art tai chi.

Shadowboxing may also refer to:

== Film and TV ==
- Shadowboxing (2010 film), a 2010 American film
- Shadowboxing (2005 film), a 2005 Russian 4-episode film
- "Shadowboxing" (Heroes), a 2009 episode of Heroes

== Music ==
- Shadowboxing (album), by Zion I, 2012, or the title track

=== Songs ===
- "Shadow Boxing" by Nasty Habits, 1996
- "Shadow Boxing", by Teena Marie from Robbery, 1983
- "Shadowboxin'", by GZA, 1996
- "Shadowboxing", by Ed Harcourt from The Beautiful Lie, 2006
- "Shadowboxing", by Julien Baker from Turn Out the Lights, 2017
- "Shadowboxing", by Tom Grennan, 2025
- "Shadowboxing", by Sara Hickman from Necessary Angels, 1994
- "Shadowboxing", by Methyl Ethel from Oh Inhuman Spectacle, 2015
- "Shadowboxing", by Parkway Drive from Reverence, 2018
