= Not Over Yet =

Not Over Yet may refer to:

- "Not Over Yet" (Grace song), a 1993 song
- "Not Over Yet" (KSI song), a 2022 song

== See also ==
- "Over Yet", a song by Hayley Williams from Petals for Armor
- "This Is Not Over Yet", a song from the musical Parade
