= MBW =

MBW may refer to:

== People ==
- Marc Bridge-Wilkinson (born 1979), English footballer
- Mr. Brainwash, a French street artist, currently living in Los Angeles also known as MBW

== Computing ==
- MacBreak Weekly, a weekly podcast about the Mac, other Apple products and Apple related hardware and software
- Memory bandwidth

== Other uses ==
- Marine Barracks, Washington, D.C., the oldest post in the United States Marine Corps
- Moonshine Branded Wrestling, a Canadian professional wrestling promotion
- MBW (IATA), a general aviation airport for light aircraft located in Mentone, Victoria
- Metropolitan Board of Works, the principal instrument of London-wide government from 1855 until the establishment of the London County Council in 1889
- Music Business Worldwide, a global music industry news and analysis website
