= Jussifer =

American songwriter

- Born: Jussi Ilmari Karvinen; 1984 (age 41–42); Saarijärvi, Finland
- Genres: Pop; rock; electropop
- Occupations: Record producer; songwriter; musician
- Years active: 2013–present

Jussi Ilmari Karvinen (born 1984), better known as Jussifer, is a Finnish-American record producer, songwriter and musician. He has worked with Kelly Clarkson, Bebe Rexha, JoJo, Alma and Dinah Jane. He also penned a track for the Spanish animated film Klaus titled "Invisible", which earned him a nomination at the 34th Goya Awards.

== Production discography ==
| Title | Year | Artist(s) | Album | Songwriting | Production |
|---|---|---|---|---|---|
| "Break Down the Walls" | 2013 | Asking Alexandria | From Death to Destiny | check | |
| "You Think" | 2015 | Girls' Generation | Lion Heart | check | |
| "Diamond" | 2015 | f(x) | 4 Walls | check | |
| "Take Me Back" (featuring Christopher) | 2015 | Matoma | Hakuna Matoma | check | |
| "Music" | 2016 | JoJo | Mad Love | check | check |
| "I Can Only" (featuring Alessia Cara) | 2016 | JoJo | Mad Love | check | check |
| "FAB" (featuring Remy Ma) | 2016 | JoJo | Mad Love | check | check |
| "Edibles" | 2016 | JoJo | Mad Love | check | check |
| "Brand New Moves" | 2017 | Hey Violet | From the Outside | | check |
| "One More Night" | 2017 | New Kids on the Block | Thankful | check | check |
| "How Did We" | 2017 | Skylar Stecker | Everything, Everything (Original Motion Picture Soundtrack) | check | check |
| "Future Friends" | 2017 | Superfruit | Future Friends | check | check |
| "Deny U" | 2017 | Superfruit | Future Friends | check | check |
| "Whole Lotta Woman" | 2017 | Kelly Clarkson | Meaning of Life | check | check |
| "Chasing Lights" | 2017 | Guy Sebastian | Conscious | check | check |
| "We Don't Have To" | 2017 | Jai Waetford | Non-album single | check | check |
| "Pictures of You" | 2018 | HMLTD | Hate Music Last Time Delete | check | check |
| "I'm a Mess" | 2018 | Bebe Rexha | Expectations | check | check |
| "2 Souls on Fire" (featuring Quavo) | 2018 | Bebe Rexha | Expectations | check | check |
| "Don't Get Any Closer" | 2018 | Bebe Rexha | Expectations | check | check |
| "You Don't Even Know Me" (with Riot) | 2018 | Slander | The Headbangers Ball | check | |
| "Eyes Closed" | 2019 | In Real Life | She Do | check | check |
| "Tie Me Down" (featuring Elley Duhé) | 2019 | Gryffin | Gravity | check | check |
| "No One Compares to You" | 2019 | Jack & Jack | A Good Friend Is Nice | check | check |
| "Lotta Love" | 2019 | Jack & Jack | A Good Friend Is Nice | | check |
| "Girl in the Mirror" | 2019 | Bebe Rexha | UglyDolls: Original Motion Picture Soundtrack | | check |
| "Got My Number" | 2019 | Kim Petras | Clarity | check | check |
| "lost" | 2019 | Loote | lost | check | |
| "Recover" | 2019 | X Ambassadors | Orion | | check |
| "Lie" | 2019 | Lukas Graham | 4 (The Pink Album) | | check |
| "Invisible" | 2019 | Zara Larsson | Klaus (Music from the Netflix Film) | check | check |
| "Sad Song" | 2020 | EBEN | Honeydew | check | check |
| "Beside You" (featuring Georgia Ku) | 2020 | Matoma & Captain Cuts | RYTME | check | |
| "Ghost" | 2020 | Noah Cyrus | THE END OF EVERYTHING | check | check |
| "The Way You Don't Look at Me" | 2021 | Demi Lovato | Dancing with the Devil... the Art of Starting Over | check | check |
| "New Blood" (featuring Boy Matthews) | 2021 | Gryffin | Non-album single | check | check |
| "Break My Heart Myself" (featuring Travis Barker) | 2021 | Bebe Rexha | Better Mistakes | check | check |
| "Baby, I'm Jealous" (featuring Doja Cat) | 2021 | Bebe Rexha | Better Mistakes | check | check |
| "Empty" | 2021 | Bebe Rexha | Better Mistakes | check | check |
| "Mama" | 2021 | Bebe Rexha | Better Mistakes | check | check |
| "I Got You" | 2021 | Becky Hill | Only Honest on the Weekend | check | check |
| "Petals" | 2021 | Pentatonix | The Lucky Ones | check | check |
| "You're Out" | 2021 | Pentatonix | The Lucky Ones | check | check |
| "Timeless" | 2022 | Sofia Carson | Sofia Carson | check | check |
| "Bitches These Days" | 2022 | Olivia O'Brien | Non-album single | check | check |
| "Better Man" | 2023 | Ellie Goulding | Higher Than Heaven | check | |
| "HONEY! (Are u coming?)" | 2023 | Måneskin | Rush! (Are U Coming?) | check | |
| "Only Love Can Save Us Now" | 2023 | Kesha | Gag Order | check | check |
| "All I Need Is You" | 2023 | Kesha | Gag Order | check | |
| "Only Love Reprise" | 2023 | Kesha | Gag Order | check | |
| "Hate Me Harder" | 2023 | Kesha | Gag Order | check | |
| "A Little Bit Happy" | 2023 | TALK | Non-album single | check | |
| "My City" | 2023 | 24kGoldn, Kane Brown, and G Herbo | Fast X | check | check |
| "Fashion" | 2023 | Billy Porter | Black Mona Lisa | check | check |
| "Baby Was A Dancer" | 2023 | Billy Porter | Black Mona Lisa | check | check |
| "Heart Wants What It Wants" | 2023 | Bebe Rexha | Bebe | check | check |
| "When It Rains" | 2023 | Bebe Rexha | Bebe | check | check |
| "Born Again" | 2023 | Bebe Rexha | Bebe | check | check |
| "Show Me Your Love" | 2023 | Georgia Ku | Non-album singles | check | check |
| "Cheating On Myself" | 2023 | Cxloe | Shiny New Thing | check | check |
| "Mania" | 2024 | Sexmane | Sanansaattaja | check | check |
| "Kuumilla hiilillä" | 2024 | Robin Packalen | Punasel | check | check |
| "MF Diamond" | 2024 | Chinchilla | Flytrap | check | check |
| "Full Attention" | 2025 | Tom Grennan | Everywhere I Went, Led Me to Where I Didn't Want to Be | | check |
| "Cool with That" | 2025 | Tom Grennan | Everywhere I Went, Led Me to Where I Didn't Want to Be | check | check |
| "Shadowboxing" | 2025 | Tom Grennan | Everywhere I Went, Led Me to Where I Didn't Want to Be | check | check |
| "Diamond" | 2025 | Tom Grennan | Everywhere I Went, Led Me to Where I Didn't Want to Be | | Additional |
