= Big Boys Don't Cry =

Big Boys Don't Cry may refer to:

- Big Boys Don't Cry, a 2000 novella by Tom Kratman
- "Big Boys Don't Cry", a song by Blue System from Walking on a Rainbow
- "Big Boys Don't Cry", a song by Extreme from Extreme

== See also ==
- Boys Don't Cry (disambiguation)
- Big Girls Don't Cry (disambiguation)
