= Boys Don't Cry =

Boys Don't Cry may refer to:

== Film ==
- Boys Don't Cry (1999 film), an American film starring Hilary Swank
- Boys Don't Cry (2000 film), a Polish film directed by Olaf Lubaszenko

== Literature ==
- Boys Don't Cry (novel), a 2010 novel by Malorie Blackman

== Music ==
- Boys Don't Cry (band), a one-hit wonder British studio band known for "I Wanna Be a Cowboy"
- Boys Don't Cry, a record label and magazine founded by Frank Ocean in 2016

=== Albums ===
- Boys Don't Cry (The Cure album) or the title song (see below), 1980
- Boys Don't Cry (Rumer album), 2012
- Blonde (Frank Ocean album), working title Boys Don't Cry, 2016

=== Songs ===
- "Boys Don't Cry" (The Cure song), 1979, also covered by Nathan Larson for the 1999 film soundtrack
- "Boys Don't Cry" (Moulin Rouge song), 1987
- "Boys Don't Cry" (Anitta song), 2022
- "Boys Don't Cry" (Lil Tecca song), 2025
- "Boys Don't Cry", by Natalia Kills from Trouble, 2013
- "Boys Don't Cry", by Plumb from Beautiful Lumps of Coal, 2003
- "Boys Don't Cry", by Ulrik Munther from Ulrik Munther, 2011
- "Boys Don’t Cry", by Camila Cabello from Familia, 2022
- "Boyz Don't Cry" (song), by Rod Wave, 2023
- "Boys Don't Cry", by Tom Grennan, 2025

== See also ==
- Big Boys Don't Cry (disambiguation)
- Boys Do Cry (disambiguation)
- Once Upon a Time in Seoul, a 2007 South Korean film, the Korean title of which means "Boys Don't Cry"
