= Lanvin (surname) =

Lanvin is a surname. Notable people with the surname include:

- Gérard Lanvin (born 1950), French actor
- Jeanne Lanvin (1867–1946), French fashion designer, founder of the French fashion house Lanvin
- Lisette Lanvin (1913–2004), French film actress
- Manu Lanvin (born 1974), French singer, Gérard Lanvin's son
