= What Ifs & Maybes =

Studio album by Tom Grennan
- Released: 16 June 2023
- Recorded: 2021–2023
- Length: 42:12
- Label: Insanity; Sony
- Producer: Carl Falk; Ryan Linvill; Lostboy; Jordan Riley; Jamie Scott; The Six; Lewis Thompson; Andrew Wells

Tom Grennan chronology
Evering Road (2021)	What Ifs & Maybes (2023)	Everywhere I Went, Led Me to Where I Didn't Want to Be (2025)

Singles from What Ifs & Maybes
- 1. "Remind Me" Released: 18 March 2022; 2. "All These Nights" Released: 15 July 2022; 3. "You Are Not Alone" Released: 16 December 2022; 4. "Here" Released: 27 January 2023; 5. "How Does It Feel" Released: 3 May 2023

What Ifs & Maybes is the third studio album by the English singer-songwriter Tom Grennan. It was released on 16 June 2023 by Insanity Records and Sony Music Entertainment. Grennan began recording the album in April 2021 and finished in July 2022, during which time he collaborated with musicians including Jamie Scott, Lostboy, and The Six. The album was preceded by the singles "Remind Me", "All These Nights", "You Are Not Alone", "Here" and "How Does It Feel" and was supported by a UK arena tour that began in March 2023. The digital version of the album features collaborations with KSI and Joel Corry.

== Background and promotion ==
In May 2021, Grennan revealed in an interview with Fleur East that he was already in the studio writing material for his third album with Jamie Scott, Mike Needle and LostBoy, despite it being only months after releasing his second album Evering Road. He said "I'm writing and riding the wave that I'm on at the moment. It's been a pretty crazy few months from getting a Number 1 [album] to 'Little Bit of Love' blowing up. I think I'm in the eye of the storm." Towards the end of 2021, Grennan began writing songs for others, which began with Westlife's single "Starlight".

Upon the release of the album's second single "All These Nights" being released, which was produced by songwriting collective The Six, Grennan expressed how the song was a teaser for the sound of his third album. On Nick Grimshaw's new podcast "Dish", he stated, "I went away to the countryside and had two weeks away and we would just write. And it came about three in the morning where we were just like, we need excitement. No one needs another bloody ballad in their lives. Do you know what I mean? No way. For me, I was like, I want to have fun and I want to change up my sound. I feel like this whole new record, especially with "All These Nights", is the start where I'm introducing people to my new sound. So, it's exciting, it's fun, it's up-tempo and it just feels like, a different me and I'm excited. Some people might not like it, some people will hopefully love it. But we'll see where it goes." He also said that the album was mostly finished and that his current partner Daniella Carraturo had been the inspiration behind the majority of the songs.

During the latter half of 2022, Grennan took part in two collaborations, being KSI's "Not Over Yet" and Joel Corry's "Lionheart (Fearless)", which were both revealed later to be on the Apple Music edition of the album. The latter became the England football team's anthem during the 2022 FIFA World Cup. Amongst the collaborations, Grennan announced the album title as What Ifs & Maybes along with a UK arena tour, beginning in March 2023, which he stated is his biggest tour in his career to date. He described the album, in reference to its title, as about "going with your gut, not your head, because you never know what's going to happen". In January 2023, upon the album's fourth single "Here" being released, the album became available for pre-order on CD, vinyl and cassette formats through his official website.

== Track listing ==
What Ifs & Maybes standard edition
No.	Title	Writer(s)	Producer(s)	Length
1.	"How Does It Feel"	Tom Grennan; Cleo Tighe; Carl Falk; Ollie Green; Tom Mann; Liam Payne; Jamie Scott	Falk; Ryan Linvill	2:23
2.	"Remind Me"	Grennan; James "Yami" Bell; Peter Rycroft	Lostboy	3:31
3.	"Crown Your Love"	Grennan; Jon Green; Ben Kohn; Pete Kelleher; Tom Barnes	Andrew Wells; TMS^{[v]}	3:04
4.	"Here"	Grennan; Lewis Thompson; Jordan Riley; Gerard O'Connell; James Essien	Riley; Thompson; Lostboy	3:15
5.	"Before You"	Grennan; Mike Needle; Mann; Rycroft	Lostboy	2:57
6.	"Sleeping Rough"	Grennan; Mann; Wells	Wells	3:20
7.	"This Side of the Room"	Grennan; Scott; Needle; Daniel Bryer	Scott; Martin Hannah; Dan Grech^{[a]}	3:05
8.	"Psychedelic Kisses"	Grennan; Wells; Anthony Rossomando; Charley Bagnall	Wells; Bagnall	2:57
9.	"All These Nights"	Grennan; Needle; Scott; Rick Boardman	The Six; Andrew Wells; Needle^{[v]}; Scott^{[v]}	2:34
10.	"Problems"	Grennan; O. Green; Jonny Lattimer	O. Green; Linvill	3:27
11.	"Head Up"	Grennan; Luke Fitton; Wayne Hector	Wells; Fitton^{[a]}^{[v]}	3:12
12.	"Love Don't Cost a Thing"	Grennan; Mann; Dan Priddy; Mark Crew	Crew; Priddy	2:43
13.	"Someone I Used to Know"	Grennan; Needle; Bryer	Wells; Bryer	2:58
14.	"You Are Not Alone"	Grennan; Scott; Needle	Scott^{[p]}^{[s]}; Rosie Danvers^{[a]}; Needle^{[v]}; Tommy Danvers^{[s]}	2:46
Total length:				42:12

What Ifs & Maybes digital bonus tracks
No.	Title	Writer(s)	Producer(s)	Length
15.	"Unbreak a Broken Love"	Grennan; Needle; Bryer	Bryer; Wells	2:41
16.	"Not Over Yet" (KSI featuring Tom Grennan)	Olajide Olatunji; Sara Boe; Grennan; Boardman; Nick Gale; Samuel Brennan; Thomas Hollings; Will Vaughan	Billen Ted; Digital Farm Animals	2:35
17.	"Lionheart (Fearless)" (with Joel Corry)	Grennan; Needle; Scott; Gale; James Murray; Mustafa Omer; Joel Corry; Thompson; Neave Applebaum	Corry; Digital Farm Animals; Thompson; Applebaum; Needle^{[v]}; Scott^{[v]}; Hannah^{[v]}	3:06
Total length:				50:34

=== Notes ===
- ^{^[p]} signifies a primary and vocal producer
- ^{^[a]} signifies an additional producer
- ^{^[v]} signifies a vocal producer
- ^{^[s]} signifies a string session producer
- "Someone I Used to Know" is titled "Somebody That I Used to Know" on physical editions.

== Personnel ==
Credits adapted from the album's liner notes and Tidal.

=== Musicians ===
- Tom Grennan – lead vocals (all tracks), backing vocals (tracks 2, 9)
- Ollie Green – backing vocals (1, 10), piano (10), synthesizers (11)
- Ryan Linvill – guitars, drums, programming (1, 10); additional instruments (10)
- Carl Falk – guitars, backing vocals (1)
- Cleo Tighe – backing vocals (1)
- Peter Rycroft – programming (2, 4, 5), backing vocals (2, 5); drum programming, instruments (2); drums (4, 5), pianos (4); guitars, synthesizers (5)
- James "Yami" Bell – backing vocals (2)
- Andrew Wells – bass, guitar, synthesizers (3, 6, 8, 9, 11, 13, 15); acoustic guitar (3, 6), piano (3, 13, 15), percussion (6, 8, 11, 13), backing vocals (6, 8), programming (9), drums (11, 15), string arrangement (13)
- Rob Humphreys – drums (3, 13)
- Lewis Thompson – programming (4, 17); bass, drums, guitar, keyboards, synthesizers (17)
- Jordan Riley – backing vocals, pianos, programming, drums (4)
- James Essien – backing vocals (4)
- Gerard O'Connell – backing vocals (4)
- Tom Mann – backing vocals (5, 6, 12)
- Mike Needle – backing vocals (5, 7, 9, 13, 15, 17)
- Emmanuel Cervantes – drums (6)
- Jamie Scott – backing vocals (7, 9, 17); piano, programming, synthesizers (7); string arrangement (14)
- Daniel Bryer – backing vocals (7, 13, 15); programming, synthesizers (13, 15)
- Dan Grech – additional programming (7)
- Scott Seiver – drums (8, 9)
- Charley Bagnall – synthesizers, backing vocals (8)
- Anthony Rossomando – backing vocals (8)
- Rick Boardman – backing vocals, synthesizers (9)
- Dino Medanhodzic – synthesizers (9)
- Jonny Lattimer – backing vocals (10)
- Wayne Hector – backing vocals (11)
- Luke Fitton – backing vocals (11)
- Dan Priddy – backing vocals, bass, guitar, keyboards, programming (12)
- Mark Crew – keyboards, programming (12)
- Jack Duxbury – guitars (12)
- Rosie Danvers – string arrangement (14)
- Wired Strings (Note: Wired Strings consists of violinists Patrick Kiernan, Hayley Pomfrett, Ellie Stanford, Sally Jackson, Charis Jenson, Jenny Sacha, Miles Brett, Raja Halder, Martyn Jackson, and Elodie Chousmer-Howelles; violists Nick Barr, Meghan Cassidy, and Emma Owens; cellists Rosie Danvers and Bryony James; and double bassist Richard Pryce.) – strings (14)
- Digital Farm Animals – backing vocals (16, 17); drums, keyboards, synthesizers (17)
- Sam Brennan – additional guitar, keyboards, synthesizer (16)
- Tom Hollings – bass, drum programming (16)
- Sara Boe – backing vocals (16)
- Paul Hesketh – guitar (16)
- KSI – vocals (16)
- Neave Applebaum – bass, drums, guitar, keyboards, programming, synthesizers (17)
- Harrison Atlee – backing vocals (17)
- Leanna Leid – backing vocals (17)
- Liza-Marie Jennings – backing vocals (17)
- Monique Meade – backing vocals (17)
- Zehra Lewis-Wright – backing vocals (17)
- Joel Corry – programming (17)

=== Technical and visuals ===
- Dan Grech – mixing (1, 2, 5–7, 10, 13, 14, 15)
- Mark "Spike" Stent – mixing (3, 4, 8, 9, 16)
- Chris Laws – mixing (3, 4, 8, 9, 16)
- Mark Crew – mixing, engineering (12)
- Kevin Grainger – mixing, mastering (17)
- Chris Gehringer – mastering (1–13, 15)
- Randy Merrill – mastering (14)
- Stuart Hawkes – mastering (16)
- Andrew Wells – engineering (3, 6, 8, 9, 11, 13, 15)
- Luke Pickering – engineering (8)
- Dan Priddy – engineering (12)
- Martin Hannah – engineering (14)
- Scott Seiver – drum engineering (9)
- Isabel Gracefield – string session engineering (14)
- Ollie Green – additional vocal recording (1)
- Matt Wolach – mixing assistance (3, 4, 8, 9, 16)
- Kieran Beardmore – mixing assistance (3, 4, 8, 9, 16)
- Charlie Holmes – mixing assistance (3, 4, 8, 9, 16)
- Connor Panayi – strings assistance (14)
- Nathanael Graham – engineering assistance (3, 6, 13, 15)
- Luke Brickett – artwork

== Charts ==
=== Weekly charts ===
Weekly chart performance for What Ifs & Maybes
Chart (2023)	Peak position
Belgian Albums (Ultratop Flanders)	197
Irish Albums (OCC)	14
Scottish Albums (OCC)	3
UK Albums (OCC)	1

=== Year-end charts ===
Year-end chart performance for What Ifs & Maybes
Chart (2023)	Position
UK Albums (OCC)	64

== Certifications ==
Certifications for What Ifs & Maybes
Region	Certification	Certified units/sales
United Kingdom (BPI)	Gold	100,000^{‡}
^{‡} Sales+streaming figures based on certification alone.
