= Here (Tom Grennan song) =

2023 single by Tom Grennan

Single by Tom Grennan

from the album What Ifs & Maybes
- Released: 27 January 2023
- Length: 3:15
- Label: Insanity
- Songwriters: Gerard O'Connell; Tom Grennan; Jordan Riley; Lewis Thompson; James Essien
- Producers: Jordan Riley; Lewis Thompson; Lostboy

Tom Grennan singles chronology
| "You Are Not Alone" (2022) | "Here" (2023) | "How Does It Feel" (2023) |

Music video
- "Here" on YouTube

"Here" is a song by English singer-songwriter Tom Grennan. It was released on 27 January 2023 as the fourth single from his third studio album What Ifs & Maybes (2023).

Upon release, Grennan said "I wanted to make a record that hopefully helps people, de-shackle, take risks and realise their dreams."

== Music video ==
The music video was released on 4 February 2023.

== Track listings ==
Digital download
| No. | Title | Length |
|---|---|---|
| 1. | "Here" | 3:15 |

Digital download
| No. | Title | Length |
|---|---|---|
| 1. | "Here" (Acoustic) | 3:07 |
| 2. | "Here" | 3:15 |

Digital download
| No. | Title | Length |
|---|---|---|
| 1. | "Here" (The Magician remix) | 4:16 |
| 2. | "Here" | 3:15 |

Digital download
| No. | Title | Length |
|---|---|---|
| 1. | "Here" (Punctual remix) | 3:03 |
| 2. | "Here" | 3:15 |

Digital download
| No. | Title | Length |
|---|---|---|
| 1. | "Here" (Madism remix) | 3:00 |
| 2. | "Here" | 3:15 |

== Charts ==
=== Weekly charts ===
Weekly chart performance for "Here"
| Chart (2023) | Peak position |
|---|---|
| Ireland (IRMA) | 55 |
| Latvia Airplay (LaIPA) | 20 |
| Lithuania Airplay (TopHit) | 63 |
| Slovakia Airplay (ČNS IFPI) | 50 |
| UK Singles (Official Charts) | 31 |

=== Monthly charts ===
Monthly chart performance for "Here"
| Chart (2023) | Peak position |
|---|---|
| Lithuania Airplay (TopHit) | 83 |
| Slovakia (Rádio Top 100) | 65 |

== Certifications ==
Certifications for "Here"
| Region | Certification | Certified units/sales |
|---|---|---|
| United Kingdom (BPI) | Silver | 200,000^{‡} |
^{‡} Sales+streaming figures based on certification alone.
