= Everywhere I Went, Led Me to Where I Didn't Want to Be =

Studio album by Tom Grennan
- Released: 15 August 2025
- Studio: House Mouse (Stockholm); RAK (London); Hazheart (Los Angeles)
- Length: 45:02
- Label: Insanity; Sony Music
- Producer: Ryland Blackinton; Russ Chell; Dan Crean; Mark Crew; Owen Cutts; Ryan Daly; Danitello; Carl Falk; Fat Max Gsus; Sam Homaee; Jussifer; Connor McDonough; Riley McDonough; The Nocturns; Dan Priddy; Sly; Gian Stone; Justin Tranter

Tom Grennan chronology
What Ifs & Maybes (2023)	Everywhere I Went, Led Me to Where I Didn't Want to Be (2025)

Singles from Everywhere I Went, Led Me to Where I Didn't Want to Be
- 1. "Higher" Released: 20 September 2024; 2. "Shadowboxing" Released: 31 January 2025; 3. "Boys Don't Cry" Released: 13 March 2025; 4. "Full Attention" Released: 9 May 2025; 5. "I Won't Miss a Thing" Released: 4 July 2025; 6. "Somewhere Only We Go" Released: 1 August 2025

Everywhere I Went, Led Me to Where I Didn't Want to Be is the fourth studio album from English singer and songwriter Tom Grennan. It was released on 15 August 2025, through Insanity Records. The 15-track album features Justin Tranter as executive producer, and spawned six singles "Higher", "Shadowboxing", "Boys Don't Cry", "Full Attention", "I Won't Miss a Thing" and "Somewhere Only We Go".

== Background and promotion ==
In September 2024, Grennan released the song "Higher" as the lead single from his forthcoming fourth studio album. For the making of the record, Grennan reached out to music producer Justin Tranter to help him explore a new sound, saying that in Tranter he found "a collaborator who understood exactly what he wanted to say and what he wanted to sound like", naming the likes of George Michael, Prince, and Freddie Mercury. He described the theme of the record as "uplifting", "that makes you dance, makes you sing".

On 31 January 2025, Grennan announced the details of his new album, and shared a brand-new song titled "Shadowboxing". The song was chosen as the follow-up single because, according to Grennan, "It represents what the whole album is about." He went further stating that the record is "about self-belief and having the confidence to take risks". "Shadowboxing" was the first song that Grennan and Tranter worked on together for the album. Speaking on the meaning of the album, Grennan said: "[It] is about me, revived. Now I'm at a place where I DO want to be. And I'm ready to blow people's heads off."

"Boys Don't Cry", "Full Attention", and "I Won't Miss a Thing" were released as the record's third, fourth and fifth singles respectively. "Somewhere Only We Go" was released on 1 August 2025 as the sixth and final pre-release single.

== Tour ==
Alongside the details of the albums, Grennan announced his biggest tour to date, "Grennan '25 Tour", which included an 11-date arena tour of the UK and Ireland in September followed by a 3-date tour of Australia in October.

== Reception ==
Professional ratings
Review scores
Source	Rating
Adrenaline Magazine	4/5 stars
The Arts Desk	2/5 stars
Buzz UK	4/5 stars
Hot Press	8/10

Everywhere I Went, Led Me to Where I Didn't Want to Be received generally positive reviews from music critics. Chloe Craft of Hot Press awarded the record with a rating of eight out of ten, describing it as "positivity" driven record where Grennan "is a pop star reborn" that has "never shone brighter". Craft praised Grennan's artistic evolution, while complimenting his vocal performance, and Justin Tranter's "sparkling" production. Emily Gillbard of Buzz magazine described the album as "a feel-good summer soundtrack", that will keep fans moving with its "rhythmic beats, serotonious harmonies and upbeat energy". Chloe Morris of Adrenaline Magazine praised the record, dubbing it "some of his best work yet".

In a more mixed review, Thomas H. Green of The Arts Desk criticised the "maximalist production", describing it as a "rictus grin reimagined as an atomic explosion." However, he acknowledged Grennan's dedication, stating that "he certainly gives it everything" on the record.

== Commercial performance ==
In the United Kingdom, Everywhere I Went, Led Me to Where I Didn't Want to Be debuted at number one on the UK Albums Chart, becoming Grennan's third consecutive chart-topping album in the country. It also topped the UK Record Store Chart, as the most popular album of the week on independent record shops. Everywhere I Went, Led Me to Where I Didn't Want to Be only spent two weeks on the UK Album Charts, becoming his shortest running album, to date. In the second week, the album dropped from number one to number 95 making it one of the few number-one albums to spend only one week in the top 75.

In Scotland, the album also debuted at number one on the Scottish Albums Chart, becoming his first chart-topper. Meanwhile, In Ireland, the record became Grennan's lowest charting album to date, peaking at number 30 on the Irish Album Chart. and departing the chart the following week.

== Track listing ==
Everywhere I Went, Led Me to Where I Didn't Want to Be track listing
No.	Title	Writer(s)	Producer(s)	Length
1.	"Full Attention"	Tom Grennan; Carl Falk; Salem al Fakir; Vincent Pontare; Mike Needle	Falk^{[p]}; Jussifer^{[p]}; Danitello^{[p]}	3:04
2.	"Cool with That"	Grennan; Cleo Tighe; Jussi Karvinen; Sylvester Sivertsen; Justin Tranter	Jussifer^{[p]}; Danitello^{[p]}; Sly^{[p]}; Tranter^{[v]}	2:55
3.	"Shadowboxing"	Grennan; Karvinen; Tighe; Tranter	Jussifer^{[p]}; Danitello^{[p]}; Tranter^{[v]}	2:52
4.	"Boys Don't Cry"	Grennan; Falk; Max Grahn; Needle	Falk; Fat Max Gsus	2:42
5.	"Somewhere Only We Go"	Grennan; Charlie Martin; Tom Mann; Needle	The Nocturns; Mark Crew; Dan Priddy	2:59
6.	"Shadows on the Ceiling"	Grennan; Connor McDonough; Riley McDonough; Toby McDonough; Ryan Daly; Castle; Needle	Daly; C. McDonough; R. McDonough	2:06
7.	"Celebrate"	Grennan; C. McDonough; R. McDonough; T. McDonough; Daly; Castle	Daly; C. McDonough; R. McDonough	2:25
8.	"Higher"	Grennan; C. McDonough; R. McDonough; T. McDonough; Daly; Castle	Daly; C. McDonough; R. McDonough	3:21
9.	"Certified"	Grennan; Owen Cutts; Harley Sulé	Cutts; Knox Brown^{[a]}; Matt Radd^{[a]}; Sulé^{[v]}	3:18
10.	"Diamond"	Grennan; Tighe; Gian Stone; Sean Douglas	Stone; Jussifer^{[a]}	3:30
11.	"Dirty Dishes"	Grennan; Sam Homaee; Dan Crean; Tranter; Beau Nox	Homaee; Crean; Tranter^{[v]}	2:34
12.	"Cinnamon"	Grennan; Ryland Blackinton; Russ Chell; Tranter; Brandon Colbein	Chell; Blackinton; Tranter^{[v]}	3:09
13.	"Drama Queen"	Grennan; Blackinton; Chell; Tranter; Nox	Chell; Blackinton; Tranter^{[v]}	3:01
14.	"I Won't Miss a Thing"	Grennan; C. McDonough; R. McDonough; T. McDonough; Daly; Castle; Needle	Daly; C. McDonough; R. McDonough	3:54
15.	"Lonely Dancer"	Grennan; C. McDonough; R. McDonough; T. McDonough; Daly; Castle; Needle	Daly; C. McDonough; R. McDonough	3:05
Total length:				45:02

=== Notes ===
- ^{^[p]} signifies a primary and vocal producer
- ^{^[a]} signifies an additional producer
- ^{^[v]} signifies a vocal producer

== Personnel ==
Credits adapted from the album's liner notes.

=== Musicians ===
- Tom Grennan – lead vocals (all tracks), background vocals (tracks 2, 3, 10–13)
- Dan Grech-Marguerat – additional programming
- Jussifer – bass, programming, drums, guitars, keyboards (1–3); synthesizers (2, 3); additional drums, additional bass (10)
- Toni "Reese" Robinson – background vocals (1, 4, 8)
- Adetoun Ayoola – background vocals (1, 4, 8)
- Victoria Titilayo Akintola – background vocals (1, 4, 8)
- Emel Pybus – background vocals (1, 4, 8)
- Ryan Carty – background vocals (1, 4, 8)
- James Thompson – background vocals (1, 4, 8)
- Carl Falk – programming, guitars, drums, bass, background vocals (1, 4); piano (1)
- Salem al Fakir – background vocals, piano (1)
- Vincent Pontare – background vocals (1)
- Cleo Tighe – background vocals (2, 3, 10)
- Justin Tranter – background vocals (2, 3, 11–13)
- Sly – drums, keyboards, programming (2)
- Amber Jones – background vocals (2)
- Mike Needle – background vocals (4, 6, 14)
- Fat Max Gsus – programming, guitar, drums, bass, background vocals (4)
- Dan Priddy – drums, guitars, keyboards, programming (5)
- Charlie Martin – guitars, keyboards, synthesizers, programming (5)
- Mark Crew – keyboards, programming (5)
- Reuben Priddy – guitars (5)
- Connor McDonough – synthesizers, background vocals (6–8, 14, 15); programming (6, 8, 14, 15), all instruments (6, 14, 15); piano, organ, guitars, bass, clavinet (7, 8)
- Riley McDonough – synthesizers, background vocals (6–8, 14, 15); programming (6, 8, 14, 15), all instruments (6, 14, 15); piano, organ, guitars, bass, clavinet (7, 8)
- Ryan Daly – synthesizers, background vocals (6–8, 14, 15); programming (6, 8, 14, 15), all instruments (6, 14, 15); piano, organ, guitars, bass, clavinet (7, 8)
- Toby McDonough – background vocals (6, 8, 14)
- Castle – background vocals (6, 8, 14)
- Jazzy – background vocals (8)
- Bri Jolie – background vocals (8)
- Porcha Clay – background vocals (8)
- Owen Cutts – keyboards, guitars, synthesizers, programming (9)
- Matt Rad – drums, synthesizers, programming (9)
- Knox Brown – drums, synthesizers (9)
- Aaron Wood – brass (9)
- Gian Stone – background vocals, guitar, percussion, programming, synthesizers, piano (10)
- Sean Douglas – background vocals, piano (10)
- Margaret Stone – background vocals (10)
- Kurt Thum – organ (10)
- Jesse McGinty – trumpet (10)
- Beau Nox – background vocals (11, 13)
- Sam Homaee – all instruments, synthesizers (11)
- Dan Crean – all instruments, synthesizers (11)
- Russ Chell – all instruments, synthesizers (12, 13)
- Ryland Blackinton – all instruments, synthesizers (12, 13)
- Brandon Colbein – background vocals (12)
- Paul Cartwright – strings (15)

=== Technical ===
- Dan Grech-Marguerat – mixing
- Chris Gehringer – mastering
- Jussifer – engineering (2, 10)
- Sly – engineering (2)
- Ryan Daly – recording, engineering, vocal engineering (6–8, 14, 15)
- Connor McDonough – recording, engineering, vocal engineering (6–8, 14, 15)
- Riley McDonough – recording, engineering, vocal engineering (6–8, 14, 15)
- Gian Stone – engineering (10)
- Luke Burgoyne – mixing assistance
- Seb Maletka-Catala – mixing assistance
- Atharva Dhekne – mastering assistance
- Will Quinnell – mastering assistance

=== Visuals ===
- Mike Lythgoe – creative direction, photography
- Edward Cooke – photography
- Set Sisters – set design
- Luke Day – styling
- Aleisha Digby – art production
- Liz Taw – grooming

== Charts ==
Chart performance for Everywhere I Went, Led Me to Where I Didn't Want to Be
Chart (2025)	Peak position
Irish Albums (OCC)	30
Scottish Albums (OCC)	1
UK Albums (OCC)	1

== Release history ==
Everywhere I Went, Led Me to Where I Didn't Want to Be release history
Region	Date	Format(s)	Label	Ref.
Various	15 August 2025	CD; digital download; streaming; vinyl	Insanity; Sony Music UK	
