= Boys Do Cry =

Boys Do Cry may refer to:

- "Boys Do Cry" (Family Guy), an episode from season 5 of Family Guy
- "Boys Do Cry" (song), a song by Swiss singer Marius Bear
- "Boys Do Cry", a song by American rock and roll group Joe Bennett & the Sparkletones

== See also ==
- Boys Don't Cry (disambiguation)
