= Great Good Fine Ok =

American synthpop band

Great Good Fine OK
- Origin: Brooklyn, New York City, U.S.
- Genres: Synthpop; indie pop
- Years active: 2013–present
- Labels: Epic; Neon Gold; Ultra
- Members: Jon Sandler (vocals); Luke Moellman (keyboards, keytar, MalletKat); Danny Wolf (drums); Carey Clayton (guitar)
- Website: greatgoodfineok.com

Great Good Fine OK (abbreviated GGFO) is an American synthpop band formed in New York City, United States, who relocated to Los Angeles in 2022. The band was founded by Jon Sandler and Luke Moellman in 2013. Although both grew up in Upstate New York (Sandler in Niskayuna and Moellman in Saratoga Springs), they met while living near each other in Brooklyn, NY. In 2013, the duo released the song "You're the One for Me." Its online popularity led to the song reaching number one on Hype Machine twice in one month. After their first seven shows at SXSW in the spring of 2013, the band signed with Neon Gold/Epic Records and Transgressive Records/Warner/Chappell Music publishing.

== Career ==
In 2013, Great Good Fine OK released a four-song EP entitled Body Diamond, which includes "You're the One for Me," "Not Going Home," "By My Side," and "Say It All." In 2014, they released a second EP entitled 2M2H licensed by Ultra Music, which reached No. 10 on the iTunes dance chart. It includes "Too Much to Handle," "Without You," "Carried Away," and "Something to Believe In" featuring St. Lucia, which premiered on Entertainment Weekly.

In 2015, the DJ duo the Chainsmokers released the single "Let You Go" featuring Great Good Fine Ok, co-written and performed by GGFO, which premiered on Billboard. The track has been remixed by Tiesto and A-Trak.

In September 2015, the band independently released the single "Take It or Leave It," which garnered 1 million Spotify plays and 200k SoundCloud plays in one month. On March 1, 2016, the band released the single "Already Love" on Spotify and SoundCloud. Both singles appear on their 2017 EP, III.

In June 2017, the duo released a joint single, "Find Yourself," with the sibling trio Before You Exit and performed at Bonnaroo Music Festival. In 2018, they embarked on a co-headline tour with Smallpools and released three singles: "Change," "Touch," and "Easy."

In 2022, Luke relocated to Los Angeles, and the group continued working on new material. On September 8, 2023, the band released "Midnight Rain," a cover of the 2022 Taylor Swift song. The group signed to Nettwerk and, with a new EP on the way, released "Will We Make It?" on October 6, 2023. They released their 2nd single, titled "Blame," from their forthcoming 6th EP on November 17, 2023.

=== Tours ===
GGFO has performed shows supporting Tove Lo, X Ambassadors, the Griswolds, Bear Hands, and Penguin Prison with 4 major US tours with Betty Who, Joywave, Magic Man, Smallpools, Vacationer, and Panama Wedding. The band is augmented by Carey Clayton and Danny Wolf for live performances.

=== Remixes ===
Great Good Fine Ok has remixed tracks by artists such as X Ambassadors, St. Lucia, Foxes, Twenty One Pilots, Luxley, Little Daylight, and others.

== Discography ==
- Body Diamond (2013)
- 2M2H (2014)
- III (2017)
- GGFOUR (2019)
- Great Good Five Ok (2021)
- EXIST (2024)
- SEVEN (2025)
