= Big Girls Don't Cry =

Big Girls Don't Cry may refer to:

== Music ==
- "Big Girls Don't Cry" (The Four Seasons song), 1962
- "Big Girls Don't Cry" (Lynn Anderson song), 1968
- Big Girls Don't Cry (Lynn Anderson album), 1968
- Big Girls Don't Cry (The Weather Girls album), 1986
- "Big Girls Don't Cry" (Fergie song), 2007

== Film and television ==
- "Big Girls Don't Cry" (The Sopranos), a 2000 TV episode
- Big Girls Don't Cry (2002 film), a 2002 German film
- Big Girls Don't Cry (Australian film), a 2002 short documentary film
- Big Girls Don't Cry (TV series), a 2024 Indian English-language series
- Big Girls Don't Cry (2026 film), a film directed by Paloma Schneideman

== Other uses ==
- Big Girls Don't Cry (book), a 2010 nonfiction book by Rebecca Traister

== See also ==
- Big Girls Don't Cry... They Get Even, a 1992 comedy film
- "Big Girls Don't Fly", an episode of Lois & Clark: The New Adventures of Superman
- "Big Girls Cry", a 2014 song by Sia
