= Higher (Tom Grennan song) =

2024 single by Tom Grennan

Single by Tom Grennan

from the album Everywhere I Went, Led Me to Where I Didn't Want to Be
- Released: 20 September 2024
- Studio: RAK Studios
- Length: 3:21
- Label: Insanity
- Songwriters: Tom Grennan; Joel Castillo; Ryan Daly; Connor McDonough; Riley McDonough; Toby McDonough
- Producers: Ryan Daly; Connor McDonough; Riley McDonough

Tom Grennan singles chronology
"How Does It Feel" (2023)	"Higher" (2024)	"It Can’t Be Christmas" (2024)

"Higher" is a song by English singer-songwriter Tom Grennan. It was released on 20 September 2024 as the lead single from his forthcoming fourth studio album, Everywhere I Went, Led Me To Where I Didn't Want To Be (2025).

Upon release, Grennan said "On the day we wrote 'Higher' I'd left the room but I just couldn't get that riff out of my head. It turned into a melody, which turned into a phrase… I ran back into the studio, with the piano riff still playing, threw my hands up and sang: 'It's taking me higher'."

== Reception ==
Desh Kapur from All Music Magazine called the song "A blast of uplifting, state-of-the-art pop" Tom Skinner from NME called it a "slick and uplifting track".

== Charts ==
=== Weekly charts ===
Weekly chart performance for "Higher"
Chart (2024–2025)	Peak position
Czech Republic Airplay (ČNS IFPI)	34
Estonia Airplay (TopHit)	26
Latvia Airplay (LaIPA)	11
Lithuania Airplay (TopHit)	1
Malta Airplay (Radiomonitor)	1
North Macedonia Airplay (Radiomonitor)	3
Poland Airplay (OLiS)	40
Romania Airplay (TopHit)	84
Serbia Airplay (Radiomonitor)	18
Slovakia Airplay (ČNS IFPI)	23
UK Singles (Official Charts)	78

=== Monthly charts ===
Monthly chart performance for "Higher"
Chart (2024)	Peak position
Estonia Airplay (TopHit)	35
Latvia Airplay (TopHit)	7
Lithuania Airplay (TopHit)	10
Slovakia (Rádio Top 100)	25
