= How Does It Feel (Tom Grennan song) =

2023 single by Tom Grennan

Single by Tom Grennan

from the album What Ifs & Maybes
- Released: 3 May 2023
- Length: 2:23
- Label: Insanity
- Songwriters: Carl Falk; Tom Grennan; Ollie Green; Tom Mann; Liam Payne; Jamie Scott; Cleo Tighe
- Producers: Carl Falk; Ryan Linvill

Tom Grennan singles chronology
"Here" (2023)	"How Does It Feel" (2023)	"Higher" (2024)

Music video
- "Here" on YouTube

"How Does It Feel " is a song by English singer-songwriter Tom Grennan. It was released on 3 May 2023 as the fifth and final single from his third studio album What Ifs & Maybes (2023).

Upon release, Grennan told NME "This song is a reflection of a moment in my life when I realised I had let something unreal slip. It's a reflection on the excitement that comes when you know you have a chance to rebuild. It's exciting, fun and gives you the energy to want to get up and do what you believe in."

== Music video ==
The music video was released on 4 May 2023.

== Track listings ==
Digital download
No.	Title	Length
1.	"How Does It Feel"	2:23

Digital download
No.	Title	Length
1.	"How Does It Feel" (Altégo remix)	3:07
2.	"How Does It Feel"	2:23

Digital download
No.	Title	Length
1.	"How Does It Feel" (Joel Corry remix)	2:39
2.	"How Does It Feel"	2:23

Digital download
No.	Title	Length
1.	"How Does It Feel" (acoustic)	2:13
2.	"How Does It Feel"	2:23

Digital download
No.	Title	Length
1.	"How Does It Feel" (Boris Way remix)	2:24
2.	"How Does It Feel"	2:23

== Charts ==
=== Weekly charts ===
Weekly chart performance for "How Does It Feel"
Chart (2023–2024)	Peak position
Belarus Airplay (TopHit)	76
CIS Airplay (TopHit)	194
Czech Republic Airplay (ČNS IFPI)	15
Ireland (IRMA)	21
Lithuania Airplay (TopHit)	46
Poland Airplay (OLiS)	90
UK Singles (Official Charts)	17

=== Monthly charts ===
Monthly chart performance for "How Does It Feel"
Chart (2023)	Peak position
Belarus Airplay (TopHit)	76
Czech Republic (Rádio Top 100)	19
Lithuania Airplay (TopHit)	56

== Certifications ==
Certifications for "How Does It Feel"
Region	Certification	Certified units/sales
United Kingdom (BPI)	Gold	400,000^{‡}
^{‡} Sales+streaming figures based on certification alone.
