= All These Nights =

2022 single by Tom Grennan

Single by Tom Grennan

from the album What Ifs & Maybes
- Released: 15 July 2022
- Length: 2:34
- Label: Insanity
- Songwriters: Rick Boardman; Mike Needle; Jamie Scott; Tom Grennan
- Producers: Andrew Wells; The Six

Tom Grennan singles chronology
"Remind Me" (2022)	"All These Nights" (2022)	"Not Over Yet" (2022)

Music video
- "All These Nights" on YouTube

"All These Nights" is a song by English singer-songwriter Tom Grennan. It was released on 15 July 2022 as the second single from his third studio album What Ifs & Maybes (2023).

Speaking about the song, Grennan said, "'All These Nights' is a song about feeling grateful for the good energy and good people in your life. The people that bring you joy and bring you love. This is the start of the new chapter. My sound is evolving. I'm opening the door and I'm announcing that 'this is where it's at now!'"

== Music video ==
An accompanying video was released on 19 August 2022.

== Track listings ==
Digital download
No.	Title	Length
1.	"All These Nights"	2:34

Digital download
No.	Title	Length
1.	"All These Nights" ((Strings Acoustic))	2:51

Digital download
No.	Title	Length
1.	"All These Nights" (Fred V Remix)	3:31

Digital download
No.	Title	Length
1.	"All These Nights" (Luca Schreiner Remix)	3:01

Digital download
No.	Title	Length
1.	"All These Nights" (Lewis Thompson Remix)	3:51

== Charts ==
=== Weekly charts ===
Weekly chart performance for "All These Nights"
Chart (2022)	Peak position
Belgium (Ultratop 50 Flanders)	36
New Zealand Hot Singles (RMNZ)	18
Slovakia Airplay (ČNS IFPI)	80
UK Singles (OCC)	37

=== Year-end charts ===
Year-end chart performance for "All These Nights"
Chart (2022)	Position
Belgium (Ultratop 50 Flanders)	141

== Certifications ==
Certifications for "All These Nights"
Region	Certification	Certified units/sales
United Kingdom (BPI)	Silver	200,000^{‡}
^{‡} Sales+streaming figures based on certification alone.
