= Full Attention (Tom Grennan song) =

Single by Tom Grennan

from the album Everywhere I Went, Led Me to Where I Didn't Want to Be
- Released: 9 May 2025
- Length: 3:04
- Label: Insanity; Sony Music UK
- Songwriters: Tom Grennan; Carl Falk; Salem Al Fakir; Vincent Pontare; Mike Needle

Tom Grennan singles chronology
"Boys Don´t Cry" (2025)	"Full Attention" (2025)	"I Won't Miss a Thing" (2025)

Music video
- "Full Attention" on YouTube

"Full Attention" is a song by English singer-songwriter Tom Grennan. It was released on 9 May 2025 as the fourth single from his fourth studio album Everywhere I Went, Led Me to Where I Didn't Want to Be (2025).

== Composition and release ==
Writing for When The Horn Blows, Laura Rosierse described the track as an "explosive pop anthem" where Grennan "shares wandering piano chords, infectious grooves and his signature stirring vocals, not at any point shying away from being unapologetically lively."

Grennan premiered "Full Attention" on BBC Radio 1's New Music Show with Jack Saunders. The song was written in Sweden by Grennan, alongside Carl Falk, Salem Al Fakir, Vincent Pontare and Mike Needle.

"We live in a world full of noise and distraction, heightened by social media on top of the usual demands and trappings of everyday life, we have lost focus of what truly matters, and this song is about navigating that noise and turning it to silence, all the negativity in the world including that of my chequered past. New unwanted noise and old baggage are diminished to nothing in my quest to solely focus on the bright light ahead, allowing me to give my FULL ATTENTION on where I’m going in life and who I truly want to become."

— Grennan explaining the meaning of the track, via Dork Magazine

== Track listing ==
- Digital download and streaming
1. "Full Attention" – 3:04
- Digital download and streaming – Spotify
1. "Full Attention" – 3:04
2. "Boys Don't Cry" – 2:42
3. "Shadowboxing" – 2:52
4. "Higher" – 3:21

== Personnel ==
Credits adapted from Apple Music.

- Tom Grennan — vocals, background vocals, composer, lyrics
- Carl Falk — vocal producer, background vocals, composer, lyrics, programming, drums, bass, keyboards, guitar, piano
- Mike Needle — composer, lyrics
- Vincent Pontare — background vocals, composer, lyrics
- Salem Al Fakir — background vocals, composer, lyrics, piano
- Jussi Karvinen — vocal producer, programming, guitar, bass, keyboards, drums
- Dan Grech-Marguerat — mixing engineer, programming
- Danitello — vocal producer
- Luke Burgoyne — assistant mixing engineer
- Seb Maletka-Catala — assistant mixing engineer
- Chris Gehringer — mastering engineer
- Will Quinnell — assistant mastering engineer
- Atharva Dhekne — assistant mastering engineer
- Toni "Reese" Robinson — choir
- Adetoun Ayoola — choir
- Victoria Titilayo Akintola — choir
- Emel Pybus — choir
- James Thompson — choir
- Ryan Carty — choir

== Charts ==
=== Weekly charts ===
Chart performance for "Full Attention"
Chart (2025)	Peak position
Belarus Airplay (TopHit)	116
Estonia Airplay (TopHit)	51
Lithuania Airplay (TopHit)	38
Romania Airplay (TopHit)	155
UK Singles Sales (OCC)	35

=== Monthly charts ===
Monthly chart performance for "Full Attention"
Chart (2025)	Peak position
Estonia Airplay (TopHit)	71
Lithuania Airplay (TopHit)	83

== Release history ==
Release dates, formats and versions of "Full Attention"
Region	Date	Format	Label	Ref.
Various	9 May 2025	Digital download; streaming	Insanity; Sony UK	
