= Will Quintrell =

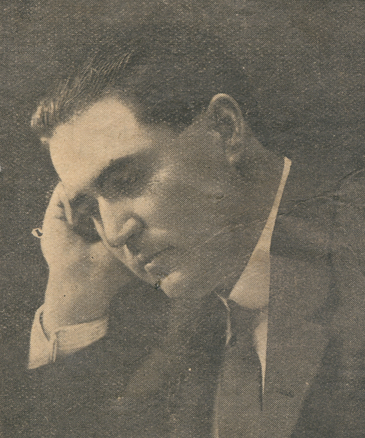
- Will Quintrell c. 1914

Background information
- Born: William Herman Quintrell; 27 June 1888
- Died: 13 August 1946 (aged 58)
- Genre: Jazz

William Herman Quintrell (27 June 1880 in Moonta, South Australia – 13 August 1946 in Sydney, New South Wales) was an Australian jazz band leader, pianist, and conductor, active during the early 20th century.

== Career ==
Quintrell's father was a musician in South Australia, and formed a concert group with his eight children. Will Quintrell studied music and then left Australia to tour with Maurice Bandmann. After he returned to Australia, in 1911 he became music director at the Tivoli Theatre, Adelaide. Three years later, he had moved interstate to work as conductor for the Tivoli, Melbourne, and then the Tivoli theatre, Sydney in 1915. At the same time, his brother Fred Quintrell was also a conductor in New York.

In August 1919 Will Quintrell married pantomime artist and musician Esmee Ellen McLennan.

=== Royal Squadron Syncopators (1925) ===
Will Quintrell and The Royal Squadron Syncopators, Regent Theatre, Sydney, about 1925.

First formed in 1925 by Quintrell, the Royal Squadron Syncopators featured members of the pit band at the Sydney Tivoli, and accompanied singer Miss Wish Wynne. They toured the Tivoli circuit over five months, led by Quintrell, including a show in Brisbane. In 1926, Quintrell led a new band called the Royal Spanish Syncopators, also at the Sydney Tivoli.

=== Tom Katz Saxophone Band, 3LO, and 'Breeze' (1928) ===
At the beginning of 1928, Quintrell formed the Tom Katz Saxophone Band, a Blackface music group who toured Australia, New Zealand, and England, and recorded music for Columbia. He also formed a new orchestra for the radio station 3LO, specialising in classical music, and another specialising in jazz.

Quintrell also arranged and recorded a version of the song 'Breeze' for Columbia in New Zealand. By May 1928, it had sold approximately 8,000 copies in New Zealand, and sold over 21,000 copies.

=== Later life (1930s–1940s) ===
During the 1930s, Quintrell left the Tivoli and joined J.C. Williamson's company. He worked for the Regent Theatre in his final years, and revived the Royal Squadron Syncopators for a series of seasons at Hoyts' Regent theatres in Brisbane (1940–1942) and Sydney (1943–1944).

Will Quintrell died 13 August 1946, and was survived by his wife and two children. Mrs Quintrell died in 1949.

His archive is held by the Australian Performing Arts Collection.
