= Shadowboxing (Tom Grennan song) =

Single by Tom Grennan

from the album Everywhere I Went, Led Me to Where I Didn't Want to Be
- Released: 31 January 2025
- Length: 2:52
- Label: Insanity; Sony Music UK
- Composers: Grennan; Justin Tranter; Jussi Karvinen; Cleo Tighe

Tom Grennan singles chronology
"It Can't Be Christmas" (2024)	"Shadowboxing" (2025)	"Boys Don't Cry" (2025)

Music video
- "Shadowboxing" on YouTube

"Shadowboxing" is a song by English singer-songwriter Tom Grennan. It was released on 31 January 2025, through Insanity Records under exclusive licence to Sony Music UK, as the second single from his fourth studio album, Everywhere I Went, Led Me to Where I Didn't Want to Be.

== Background and promotion ==
"Shadowboxing" was released alongside the details of Grennan's fourth studio album. Grennan said that about the track “It’s about my fight with a side of me I have a lot of trouble with, it’s still a daily battle. But I’ve learned how to fight all these demons and I’m mentally and physically prepared now. I’m in athlete mode.” Grennan revelead that "Shadowboxing" was the first song that he wrote with Justin Tranter.

A music video for the song was released on 20 February 2025.

== Track listing ==
- Digital download and streaming
1. "Shadowboxing" – 2:52
- Digital download and streaming – Spotify
1. "Shadowboxing" – 2:52
2. "Higher" – 3:21

== Personnel ==
Credits adapted from Apple Music.

- Tom Grennan — vocals, background vocals, composer, lyrics
- Justin Tranter — background vocals, vocal producer, composer, lyrics
- Jussi Karvinen — vocal producer, programming, guitar, bass, keyboards, drums, synthesizer
- Cleo Tighe — background vocals, composer, lyrics
- Danitello — vocal producer
- Dan Grech-Marguerat — mixing engineer
- Luke Burgoyne — assistant mixing engineer, assistant engineer
- Seb Maletka-Catala — assistant mixing engineer, assistant engineer
- Chris Gehringer — mastering engineer
- Will Quinnell — assistant mastering engineer
- Atharva Dhekne — assistant mastering engineer

== Charts ==
Chart performance for "Shadowboxing"
Chart (2025)	Peak position
Lithuania Airplay (TopHit)	17
UK Singles Sales Chart (OCC)	57
UK Singles Downloads Chart (OCC)	56

== Release history ==
Release dates, formats and versions of "Shadowboxing"
Region	Date	Format	Label	Ref.
Worldwide	31 January 2025	Digital download; streaming	Insanity; Sony UK	
