= Not Over Yet (KSI song) =

2022 single by KSI featuring Tom Grennan

Single by KSI featuring Tom Grennan

from the album What Ifs & Maybes (Apple Music Edition)
- Released: 5 August 2022
- Genre: Electronic; drum and bass; dance-pop
- Length: 2:35
- Label: Warner; Atlantic
- Songwriters: Olajide Olatunji; Richard Boardman; Nick Gale; Sam Brennan; Sara Boe; Tom Grennan; Tom Hollings
- Producers: Digital Farm Animals; Billen Ted

KSI singles chronology
"Locked Out" (2022)	"Not Over Yet" (2022)	"Summer Is Over" (2022)

Tom Grennan singles chronology
"All These Nights" (2022)	"Not Over Yet" (2022)	"Lionheart (Fearless)" (2022)

Music video
- "Not Over Yet" on YouTube

"Not Over Yet" is a song by British YouTuber and rapper KSI featuring British singer-songwriter Tom Grennan. The song was written by the two artists alongside Sara Boe, Richard Boardman, and producers Digital Farm Animals & Billen Ted. "Not Over Yet" was released for digital download and streaming by Warner Music Group, Beerus Limited, and Atlantic Records on 5 August 2022. A remix of the song was released 27 August 2022 featuring British rappers Headie One and Nines. The remix was performed for KSI's ring walk against Luis Alcaraz Pineda on 27 August 2022.

"Not Over Yet" debuted at number four on the UK Singles Chart, becoming KSI's eighth top 10 hit, and Grennan's fourth. The song would later feature on the Apple Music edition of Grennan's third studio album What Ifs & Maybes.

== Music and lyrics ==
"Not Over Yet" featuring an "energetic" drum and bass beat with "tender" lyrics conveying "the singer's struggle to overcome feelings of self-doubt".

== Music video ==
The music video was directed by Troy Roscoe and premiered on 5 August 2022, along with the single’s release.

== Track listing ==
Digital download
No.	Title	Length
1.	"Not Over Yet" (featuring Tom Grennan)	2:35

Digital download – remix
No.	Title	Length
1.	"Not Over Yet" (remix; featuring Headie One and Nines)	2:29
2.	"Not Over Yet" (featuring Tom Grennan)	2:35

Digital download – acoustic
No.	Title	Length
1.	"Not Over Yet" (featuring Tom Grennan; acoustic)	2:37
2.	"Not Over Yet" (featuring Tom Grennan)	2:35
3.	"Not Over Yet" (remix; featuring Headie One and Nines)	2:29

== Credits and personnel ==
Credits adapted from YouTube Music

- Tom Grennan – vocals, composer
- Billen Ted – producer
- Digital Farm Animals – producer, backing vocals, composer
- KSI – vocals, composer
- Paul Hesketh – guitar
- Sara Boe – backing vocals, composer
- Richard Boardman – composer
- Sam Brennan – composer
- Tom Hollings – composer

== Charts ==
Weekly chart performance for "Not Over Yet"
Chart (2022)	Peak position
Australia (ARIA)	47
Global Excl. US (Billboard)	136
Ireland (IRMA)	11
Netherlands (Single Tip)	27
New Zealand Hot Singles (RMNZ)	2
Slovakia Airplay (ČNS IFPI)	51
Sweden Heatseeker (Sverigetopplistan)	5
UK Singles (Official Charts)	4
US Hot Dance/Electronic Songs (Billboard)	20

== Certifications ==
Certifications and sales for "Not Over Yet"
Region	Certification	Certified units/sales
United Kingdom (BPI)	Platinum	600,000^{‡}
^{‡} Sales+streaming figures based on certification alone.

== Release history ==
Release dates and formats for "Not Over Yet"
Region	Date	Format(s)	Version	Label(s)	Ref.
Various	5 August 2022	Digital download; streaming; CD	Original	Atlantic Records; Warner Music Group	
Various	28 August 2022	Digital download; streaming	Remix	Atlantic Records; Warner Music Group	
Various	15 September 2022	Digital download; streaming	Acoustic	Atlantic Records; Warner Music Group	
