= Remind Me (Tom Grennan song) =

2022 single by Tom Grennan

Single by Tom Grennan

from the album What Ifs & Maybes
- Released: 18 March 2022
- Length: 3:31
- Label: Insanity
- Songwriters: Peter Rycroft; James Yami Bell; Tom Grennan
- Producer: Lostboy

Tom Grennan singles chronology
"Don't Break the Heart" (2021)	"Remind Me" (2022)	"All These Nights" (2022)

Music video
- "Remind Me" on YouTube

"Remind Me" is a song by English singer-songwriter Tom Grennan. It was released on 18 March 2022 as the lead single from his third studio album What Ifs & Maybes (2023).

== Background ==
Speaking about the song, Grennan said, "I wanted to write a song that reminded me of a moment in my life where I realised I had given up something that was really making a difference in my life – in a good way. It's about reconnecting. It's that feeling when you're at the top of the rollercoaster and you're like: this is the best feeling".

== Music video ==
An accompanying video was released on 7 April 2022.

== Track listings ==
Digital download
No.	Title	Length
1.	"Remind Me"	3:31

Digital download
No.	Title	Length
1.	"Remind Me" (Billen Ted Remix)	3:03

Digital download
No.	Title	Length
1.	"Remind Me" (Luca Schreiner Remix)	3:40

Digital download
No.	Title	Length
1.	"Remind Me" (TCTS Remix)	3:46

Digital download
No.	Title	Length
1.	"Remind Me" ((Gospel Version))	3:34

Digital download
No.	Title	Length
1.	"Remind Me" (MOTi Remix)	2:53

== Charts ==
=== Weekly charts ===
Weekly chart performance for "Remind Me"
Chart (2022)	Peak position
Belgium (Ultratop 50 Flanders)	28
Ireland (IRMA)	21
Poland (Polish Airplay Top 100)	13
UK Singles (OCC)	27

=== Year-end charts ===
Year-end chart performance for "Remind Me"
Chart (2022)	Position
Belgium (Ultratop 50 Flanders)	142

== Certifications ==
Certification for "Remind Me"
Region	Certification	Certified units/sales
Poland (ZPAV)	Gold	25,000^{‡}
United Kingdom (BPI)	Platinum	600,000^{‡}
^{‡} Sales+streaming figures based on certification alone.
