= Lionheart (Fearless) =

2022 single by Joel Corry and Tom Grennan

Single by Joel Corry and Tom Grennan

from the album Another Friday Night
- Released: 21 October 2022
- Length: 3:06
- Label: Warner
- Songwriters: Joel Corry; Lewis Thompson; Neave Applebaum; Nicholas Gale; Tom Grennan; Mike Needle; Jamie Scott; James Murray; Mustafa Omer
- Producers: Corry; New Levels; Digital Farm Animals

Joel Corry singles chronology
"History" (2022)	"Lionheart (Fearless)" (2022)	"Molly" (2022)

Tom Grennan singles chronology
"Not Over Yet" (2022)	"Lionheart (Fearless)" (2022)	"Driving Home for Christmas" (2022)

Music video
- "Lionheart (Fearless)" on YouTube

"Lionheart (Fearless)" is a song by English DJ and producer Joel Corry and English singer and songwriter Tom Grennan. It was released on 21 October 2022.

To coincide with the 2022 FIFA World Cup, a version featuring English football commentator Martin Tyler was released on 18 November 2022 under the title "Lionheart (Come On England)".

== Background and release ==
Corry and Grennan recorded the track during the course of a number of studio sessions in late 2021. In a statement, Corry said "This record is a new direction for me and an evolution of my sound. I wanted a create an anthem for the festival main stages and I can't wait to perform it with Tom around the world."

Grennan added, "'Lionheart' is a call to arms. People are living through uncertain times right now, and this song is all about finding the strength to kick back in the face of adversity. I hope you all have as much fun listening to this new tune as Joel and I did making it."

== Music video ==
An accompanying video was released on 28 October 2022.

The music video opens with Corry and Grennan stepping out a car and later shows Corry and Grennan doing an adventure mud course.

== Track listings ==
Digital download
No.	Title	Length
1.	"Lionheart (Fearless)"	3:06

Digital download
No.	Title	Length
1.	"Lionheart (Come On England)" (featuring Martin Tyler)	3:16
2.	"Lionheart (Fearless)"	3:06

== Charts ==
=== Weekly charts ===
2022–2023 weekly chart performance for "Lionheart (Fearless)"
Chart (2022–2023)	Peak position
Belarus Airplay (TopHit)	10
Belgium (Ultratop 50 Flanders)	20
CIS Airplay (TopHit)	13
Croatia International Airplay (Top lista)	23
Czech Republic Airplay (ČNS IFPI)	14
Estonia Airplay (TopHit)	2
France Airplay (SNEP)	16
Hungary (Rádiós Top 40)	29
Ireland (IRMA)	35
Kazakhstan Airplay (TopHit)	10
Latvia Airplay (LaIPA)	7
Lithuania Airplay (TopHit)	9
Moldova Airplay (TopHit)	109
Netherlands (Dutch Top 40)	15
Netherlands (Single Top 100)	35
New Zealand Hot Singles (RMNZ)	21
Poland Airplay (OLiS)	2
Romania Airplay (TopHit)	89
Russia Airplay (TopHit)	12
Slovakia Airplay (ČNS IFPI)	10
UK Singles (Official Charts)	18
UK Dance (Official Charts)	5
US Hot Dance/Electronic Songs (Billboard)	35

2024 weekly chart performance for "Lionheart (Fearless)"
Chart (2024)	Peak position
Belarus Airplay (TopHit)	172
CIS Airplay (TopHit)	200
Estonia Airplay (TopHit)	68

Weekly chart performance for "Lionheart (Come On England)"
Chart (2023)	Peak position
CIS Airplay (TopHit)	89
Estonia Airplay (TopHit)	80
Russia Airplay (TopHit)	64

=== Monthly charts ===
2022 monthly chart performance for "Lionheart (Fearless)"
Chart (2022)	Peak position
CIS Airplay (TopHit)	79
Slovakia (Rádio Top 100)	36

2023 monthly chart performance for "Lionheart (Fearless)"
Chart (2023)	Peak position
Belarus Airplay (TopHit)	11
CIS Airplay (TopHit)	16
Czech Republic (Rádio Top 100)	14
Estonia Airplay (TopHit)	6
Kazakhstan Airplay (TopHit)	11
Latvia Airplay (TopHit)	89
Lithuania Airplay (TopHit)	12
Romania Airplay (TopHit)	93
Russia Airplay (TopHit)	15
Slovakia (Rádio Top 100)	12

2024 monthly chart performance for "Lionheart (Fearless)"
Chart (2024)	Peak position
Estonia Airplay (TopHit)	77

=== Year-end charts ===
2022 year-end chart performance for "Lionheart (Fearless)"
Chart (2022)	Position
Netherlands (Dutch Top 40)	92

2023 year-end chart performance for "Lionheart (Fearless)"
Chart (2023)	Position
Belarus Airplay (TopHit)	28
Belgium (Ultratop 50 Flanders)	69
CIS Airplay (TopHit)	26
Estonia Airplay (TopHit)	18
Kazakhstan Airplay (TopHit)	74
Lithuania Airplay (TopHit)	60
Netherlands (Dutch Top 40)	72
Poland (Polish Airplay Top 100)	62
Russia Airplay (TopHit)	35

2024 year-end chart performance for "Lionheart (Fearless)"
Chart (2024)	Position
Estonia Airplay (TopHit)	116

== Certifications ==
Certifications for "Lionheart (Fearless)"
Region	Certification	Certified units/sales
Poland (ZPAV)	Gold	25,000^{‡}
United Kingdom (BPI)	Platinum	600,000^{‡}
^{‡} Sales+streaming figures based on certification alone.
