= Music Business Worldwide =

Global music industry news website

- Screenshot of the website in December 2024
- Company type: Private company
- Website type: Digital media, international news
- Available in: English
- Headquarters: United Kingdom
- Owners: Penske Media Corporation, Tim Ingham
- Founder: Tim Ingham
- Industry: Music industry
- Website: musicbusinessworldwide.com
- Advertising: Yes
- Commercial: Yes
- Registration: None
- Launched: 2015; 11 years ago
- Current status: Active
- Written in: PHP

Music Business Worldwide (MBW) is a global music industry news and analysis website launched in 2015 by former Music Week editor Tim Ingham. As of December 2020, it ranked 22,845 in the list of most visited global websites according to Alexa Internet.

== History ==
Music Business Worldwide was founded by former Music Week editor Tim Ingham. He registered the company in 2014 and launched the website in 2015. In August 2015, Music Business Worldwide signed a content partnership deal with Business Insider.

In May 2017, ex-Music Week publisher Dave Roberts joined Music Business Worldwide as associate publisher. In October 2017, Ingham was presented with a Gold Badge award from the British Academy of Songwriters, Composers and Authors (now The Ivors Academy) for having "supported or inspired the UK songwriting and composing community".

In 2018, Music Business Worldwide signed a global content partnership with Rolling Stone. In February 2020, Penske Media Corporation, the owner of Rolling Stone made a strategic investment into Music Business Worldwide. As of December 2020, Music Business Worldwide was "more than 25% but not more than 50%" owned by each of P-Mrc Holdings, Llc and Tim Ingham.

In 2019, MBW launched a weekly podcast. The first 124 episodes were broadcast without an overarching theme but were, in August 2021, formalised as Season One. Until that point, the podcast had been hosted only on MBW's website, but thereafter all episodes were made available on mainstream podcasting platforms including Spotify, with an even wider selection of platforms publishing it starting in July 2022.

== Spotify coverage ==
In August 2016, Music Business Worldwide cited sources who said that Spotify was commissioning and promoting pseudonymous artists – which MBW dubbed "fake artists" – on its platform. In July 2017, the Vulture made similar accusations, citing MBW's story. When Billboard covered the story, a Spotify representative denied such a practice. Music Business Worldwide fired back by publishing a list of so-called “fake artists” on Spotify, who had no website or social media presence.

In February 2018, the publication uncovered a scam run on Spotify from Bulgaria. Music Business Worldwide estimated that the enterprise saw Spotify pay out over $1 million in royalties to the scammers.

== Streaming calculations ==
Music Business Worldwide has published reports featuring calculations, based on public filings, of the amount of money generated from streaming by the three major record companies. In February 2019, MBW calculated that Universal Music Group, Sony Music Entertainment and Warner Music Group jointly generated approximately $19 million a day from streaming during 2018. In February 2020, Music Business Worldwide calculated that the three companies were now collectively generating over $1 million per hour in royalties from streaming platforms.
