= Manu Lanvin =

French singer-songwriter (born 1973)

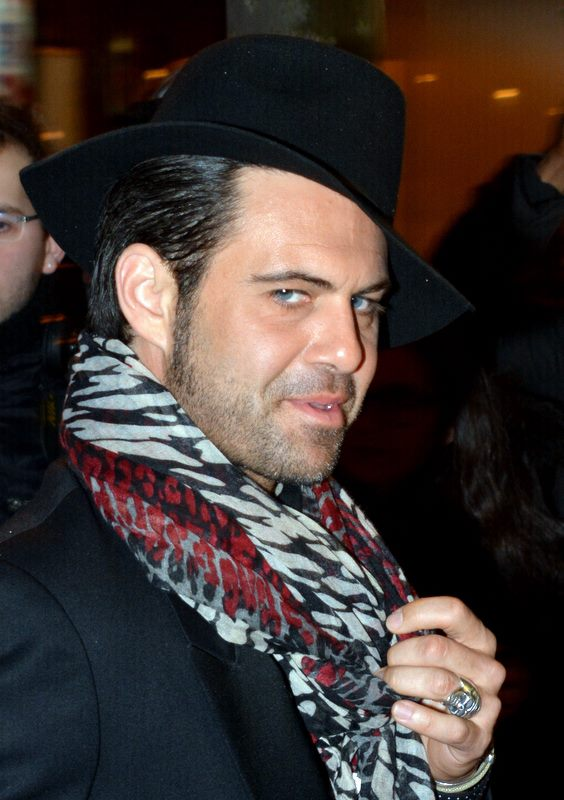
- Manu Lanvin in 2017

Background information
- Born: Emmanuel Lanvin
- Origin: France
- Genres: Blues rock
- Occupations: Singer-songwriter, musician, performer
- Instruments: Electric guitar, acoustic guitar, voice
- Years active: 2000–present
- Website: www.manulanvin.com

Manu Lanvin (born 23 november 1973) is a French blues rock singer-songwriter, guitarist and producer. He's the son of French actor Gérard Lanvin.

== Biography ==
As an autodidact, Manu Lanvin starts drums and guitar and grows with some French artists as Téléphone, Paul Personne, Bernie Bonvoisin.

From 2000 to 2007, he edits three albums. In 2007, he meets the American bluesman Calvin Russell. They become friends and Manu coproduces Calvin Russell's last album studio Dawg Eat Dawg.

In 2012, Manu releases his fourth album Mauvais casting and a single Sur la route sixty one. The clip is filming in Mississippi with the assistance of the Delta State University At Montreux Jazz Festival, he meets Quincy Jones who invites him to the Jazz Foundation of America in New York.

Manu writes the soundtrack for some films. He meets another American bluesman Neal Black and goes on tour with him in 2013 during their Paris-Texas Tour.

In 2014, he composes his fifth album Son(s) of the Blues and represents France at International Blues Challenge in Memphis.

== Discography ==
=== Albums ===
- 2000: Venir au monde
- 2004: Les temps mauvais
- 2007: Faible humain
- 2012: Mauvais casting
- 2014: Son(s) of the Blues
- 2016: Blues, Booze & Rock'n'Roll
- 2019: Grand casino

=== Collaborations ===
- 2009: Dawg Eat Dawg by Calvin Russell
- 2011: Contrabendo by Calvin Russell
- 2011: The last call, in the heat of a night by Calvin Russell

== Filmography ==
=== Musician ===
- 2006: On ne devrait pas exister by HPG
- 2009: Lucky Luke by James Huth
- 2010: Chicas by Yasmina Reza
- 2012: Rock 'n' Bled by Touria Benzari, short

=== Actor ===
- 2011: A Gang Story by Olivier Marchal
