= Before You Exit =

American pop band

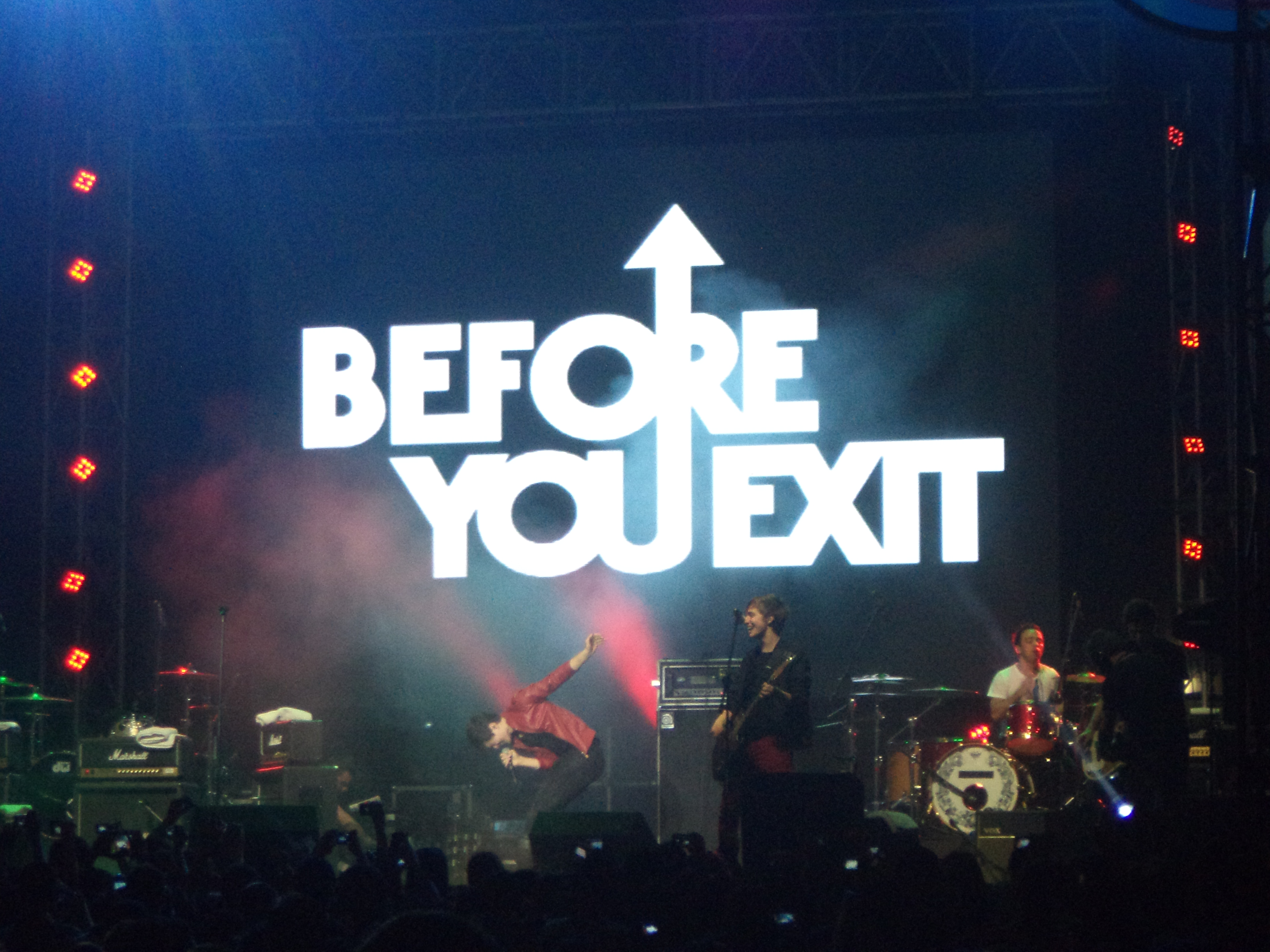
- Before You Exit at Circuit Fest Manila in 2013

Background information
- Also known as: BYE
- Origin: Orlando, Florida, U.S.
- Genres: Pop rock; pop
- Years active: 2007–present
- Labels: Independent; Wright Entertainment Group; WEG; RCA
- Members: Riley McDonough; Connor McDonough; Toby McDonough
- Past members: Braiden Wood; Thomas Silvers
- Website: beforeyouexit.com

Before You Exit is an American pop rock band originally from Orlando, Florida, now based in Los Angeles, California. It consists of brothers Connor, Riley, and Toby McDonough.

In August 2009, they self-released their debut EP, A Short Story Long. In March 2011, they released their second EP, Letting Go, and their third EP, I Like That, was released in February 2013. In July 2015, they released their single, "Model". Before You Exit's latest EP, All the Lights, was released on April 8, 2016. Since All the Lights, the band released two singles, "Find Yourself" (in collaboration with Great Good Fine Ok) and "Strangers", before releasing their first album, Love, Pain, & Retrospect in June 2019.

== History ==
=== Formation and early years (2007–2008) ===
Connor McDonough and Braiden Wood first met through their church youth group. Wood proposed the idea of starting a band, and introduced McDonough to Thomas Silvers, the three of them joining together to form the band. They added a fourth member who did not remain a part of the band. Riley then joined the band as the permanent fourth member. The band's original name was soulbinder39. Wood's mother chose the name "Before You Exit", initially stylized in the form of texting lingo as "B4UXIT", but later changed to the full grammatically correct spelling. Their name eventually became short for the band's motto, "make a difference before you exit", which developed afterward.

=== 2009–2011 ===
In 2009, they released their first EP, A Short Story Long. The first tour that the band performed in was All Time Low's 2010 My Small Package Tour, in which they became a supporting act in the middle of the tour. They also played a few shows on All Time Low's 2011 tour, the Dirty Work Tour.

In 2010, the band was featured in the music video for "Love Me or Let Me Go" by Avery, released on YouTube on November 11, 2010. Before You Exit also had a guest appearance in the official video for Stefanie Scott's "Girl I Used to Know", released via YouTube on October 20, 2011.

In 2011, the band released their second EP, Letting Go. Following the release was their own mini-headlining The Next Big Thing Tour in fall 2011.

=== 2012–2013 ===
The band first released "End of the World" as single on January 10, 2012, before releasing a newer version of the song featuring the rapper, Anth, on December 21, 2012.

They were supporting acts in Allstar Weekend's All the Way Tour, alongside Hollywood Ending and the After Party. The band also auditioned for the American version of The X Factor; they made it through to the judges' houses round but withdrew because they realized that the competition was not for them. In August 2012, the band's line up changed as Toby McDonough, younger brother of Connor and Riley, joined the group. Due to their growing success and recognition in South America, the band was invited to perform at Brazil's 2012 NoCapricho Festival.

In February 2013, the band released their third EP, I Like That. They were on tour supporting Action Item in the Resolution Tour, along with Paradise Fears and Hello Highway to promote their newest songs.

The band was the only supporting act for the North American leg of English singer Olly Murs' Right Place Right Time Tour. During the summer of 2013, they appeared on Cody Simpson's Paradise Tour as a supporting act, along with Ryan Beatty. On August 17 and 18, they traveled to Singapore to close for The Color Run at Sentosa, and to Malaysia on August 19 at Sunway Pyramid Mall. Throughout the years, the band's fame had also expanded to the Philippines where they performed in the Circuit Fest on May 25, 2013.

=== 2014–present ===
In early 2014, live member Braiden Wood announced via Tumblr that he would resign from the band to start a career as a solo artist.

Before You Exit released a music video for the newly recorded acoustic version of "Soldier" from their 2013 EP I Like That on February 12, 2014, via YouTube. On July 17, 2014, Before You Exit released their standalone single "Heart Like California", which was premiered during a live chat via Stageit in December 2013.

In March, the band began their own headlining tour, The Dangerous Tour, which visited 10 cities along the east coast and one show in Manila, Philippines in May. A new single, "Dangerous", was released on March 18, the first day of the Dangerous Tour. Opening acts included Spencer Sutherland, Plug in Stereo, and Macy Kate. In June 2014, the band then went on to join the girl group Fifth Harmony on their Fifth Times a Charm Tour after opening for them at the House of Blues in Orlando earlier in the year.

On April 28, 2014, Before You Exit was selected to compete in the annual Macy's iHeartRadio Rising Star contest. After over 7 million votes total, the band was announced as the winner. Before You Exit received a slot at the annual iHeartRadio Music Festival lineup, which was held at MGM Grand Las Vegas, and was also awarded their own parade float on the Macy's Thanksgiving Day Parade.

In 2015, some changes occurred regarding Before You Exit and their future as a band. Due to increased popularity, Before You Exit toured Europe for the first time performing 22 shows in January to February 2015 with Christina Grimmie. On July 7, 2015, the band announced on social media that they had signed their first record deal with RCA Records. The next day, they announced their new single "Model" which was released July 17, 2015. The music video for "Model" premiered on VEVO on October 26, 2015.

During the summer of 2015, Before You Exit joined English band the Vamps on their American tour as a supporting act, alongside the Tide. The tour consisted of 12 shows across the United States from July 21 to August 8, 2015.

On March 5, 2016, Before You Exit placed a countdown timer on their website, stating that they would make an announcement when the timer ends. On March 11, 2016, at midnight, the band announced a new EP, All the Lights, featuring their singles "Model" and "When I'm Gone". The EP was released on April 8, 2016, and debuted at number 1 on iTunes in the Philippines. On April 26, 2016, Before You Exit announced The All the Lights Tour, with Christina Grimmie and special guests, which would visit 11 cities and run from May 29 to June 17, 2016. The final two shows were canceled following the murder of Grimmie after a show in Orlando, Florida on June 10, 2016. On December 14, 2016, they released "Clouds" as a tribute to Grimmie.

On May 25, 2017, Before You Exit was removed from the list among RCA's recording artists on RCA's website. On May 26, all the videos on Before You Exit's VEVO channel were deleted and reuploaded on the same day. Given these two occurrences, it was widely suspected that Before You Exit departed from the label, although there was no explanation or confirmation of these speculations on the part of either Before You Exit or RCA.

On May 26, 2017, the band released a single with Great Good Fine Ok entitled "Find Yourself". The official music video was released on YouTube on July 7, 2017.

On November 3, 2017, the band released their new single entitled "Strangers". On Twitter, lead singer Riley said the song is about someone meeting another, initially planning to start a relationship and learning everything about them, but when it ends, it was almost as if the two never met, but the feelings one had were still there.

The band has written songs with Alex Gaskarth of All Time Low, Patrick Stump of Fall Out Boy, Stephen Barker Liles of Love and Theft, and Dan Book and Alexei Misoul, producers who have worked with acts such as Hot Chelle Rae and the Summer Set. The band has said they draw inspiration from artists like Rascal Flatts, John Mayer, Maroon 5 and hope to one day write with them.

On October 6, 2018, the band announced via Twitter that their first album was complete, and they would be releasing it in three parts: Love, Pain and Retrospect. They stated in the message that the first single off the album would be released on October 19. The first single from the album, "Silence", was released on October 19, 2018. This also started the beginning of the Love section of the album.

== Members ==
=== Current members ===
- Connor Patrick McDonough (born November 18, 1993) - lead vocals (2007- approximately 2009), vocals, lead guitar, piano, keyboards, drums, production (2007–present)
- Riley Thomas McDonough (born August 31, 1995) - lead vocals (approximately 2010-present), bass guitar (2008 - approximately 2012), vocals, guitar (2008–present)
- Toby James McDonough (born January 21, 1998) – vocals, guitar, piano, keyboards (2012–present)

=== Former and live members ===
- Braiden Montgomery Wood (born September 2, 1993) – rhythm guitar, piano, keyboards (2007–2014)
- Thomas Christian Silvers (born September 8, 1993) – drums (2007–present)

Braiden and Thomas are two of the founding members of Before You Exit. Braiden left the band in 2014, and has released two solo EPs, Be Free, Be Strong (2014) and Noiz (2015). Thomas did not perform on the summer 2015 tour with the Vamps.

- Chris Ganoudis – bass (2014)
- Ryan SJ Wheeler – bass (2014–2016)
- Chris Kamrada – drums (2015–2016)
- Josh Barker – bass, back-up vocals (2016)

Chris Ganoudis is a friend of the band and filled in as a live member during 2014, following Braiden's departure. Ganoudis is a member of the band Like the Movies. Ryan Wheeler announced January 5, 2016, on social media that he would no longer be performing with Before You Exit to focus on his other band, Blame Candy.

== Tours ==
=== Headlining ===
- 2011 – October: The Next Big Thing Tour
- 2014 – March, April and May: The Dangerous Tour
- 2015 – January–February: Europe Tour with Christina Grimmie
- 2016 – May–June: All the Lights Tour with Christina Grimmie
- 2017 – February–March: Asia Tour 2017

=== Supporting ===
- 2010 – October–November: All Time Low's My Small Package Tour
- 2011 – March, April and May: All Time Low's Dirty Work Tour
- 2012 – January–February: Allstar Weekend's All the Way Tour
- 2013 – January–February: Action Item's Resolution Tour
- 2013 – April–May: Olly Murs' Right Place Right Time Tour
- 2013 – May, June and July: Cody Simpson's Paradise Tour
- 2014 – June: Fifth Harmony's Fifth Times A Charm Tour
- 2015 – July–August: The Vamps' North American Tour

=== Other appearances ===
- 2013 – May 25: Circuit Fest – Manila, Philippines
- 2014 – June: DigiTour NYC and Toronto (Canada)
- 2014 – July–August: Run Around Tour
- 2015 – January–February : First European Tour
- 2016 – January 30: 3LOGYINMANILA, Philippines with the Vamps and many other artists

== Discography ==
=== Album ===
Title	Release details
Love, Pain, & Retrospect	Released: June 28, 2019; Format: Digital download, LP, streaming; Label: Independent

=== Extended plays ===
Title	Release details
A Short Story Long	Released: August 12, 2009; Format: Digital download, CD; Label: Independent
Letting Go	Released: March 4, 2011; Format: Digital download, CD; Label: Independent
I Like That	Released: February 4, 2013; Format: Digital download, CD; Label: Sony
All the Lights	Released: April 8, 2016; Format: Digital download, CD; Label: RCA
001_love	Released: November 16, 2018; Format: Digital download, streaming; Label: RCA
002_pain	Released: March 8, 2019; Format: Digital download, streaming; Label: RCA

=== Singles ===
- "O' Silent Night" (November 25, 2011)
- "End of the World" (January 10, 2012)
- "What Makes You Beautiful" (One Direction cover) (2012)
- "End of the World" (featuring Anth) (December 21, 2012)
- "A Little More You" (2013)
- "I Like That" (2013)
- "Soldier" (February 10, 2014)
- "Dangerous" (March 18, 2014)
- "Heart Like California" (July 17, 2014)
- "Model" (July 17, 2015)
- "When I'm Gone" (March 11, 2016)
- "Suitcase" (2016)
- "Clouds" (December 14, 2016)
- "Radiate" (2017)
- "Find Yourself" (with Great Good Fine Ok) (May 26, 2017)
- "Strangers" (November 3, 2017)
- "Silence" (October 19, 2018)
- "NUMB" (featuring Lash) (February 1, 2019)
- "Same Sun" (July 17, 2020)
- "Paradise" (with Great Good Fine Ok) (April 8, 2021)

=== Official music videos ===
- "I Like That" (May 30, 2013)
- "Soldier" (February 12, 2014)
- "Dangerous" (March 22, 2014)
- "Model" (October 26, 2015)
- "When I'm Gone" (March 28, 2016)
- "Find Yourself" (July 7, 2017)
- "Silence" (January 13, 2019)
- "Sinking In" (April 14, 2019)
- "The Butterfly Effect" (July 22, 2019)
