= Tom Grennan =

English singer-songwriter (born 1995)

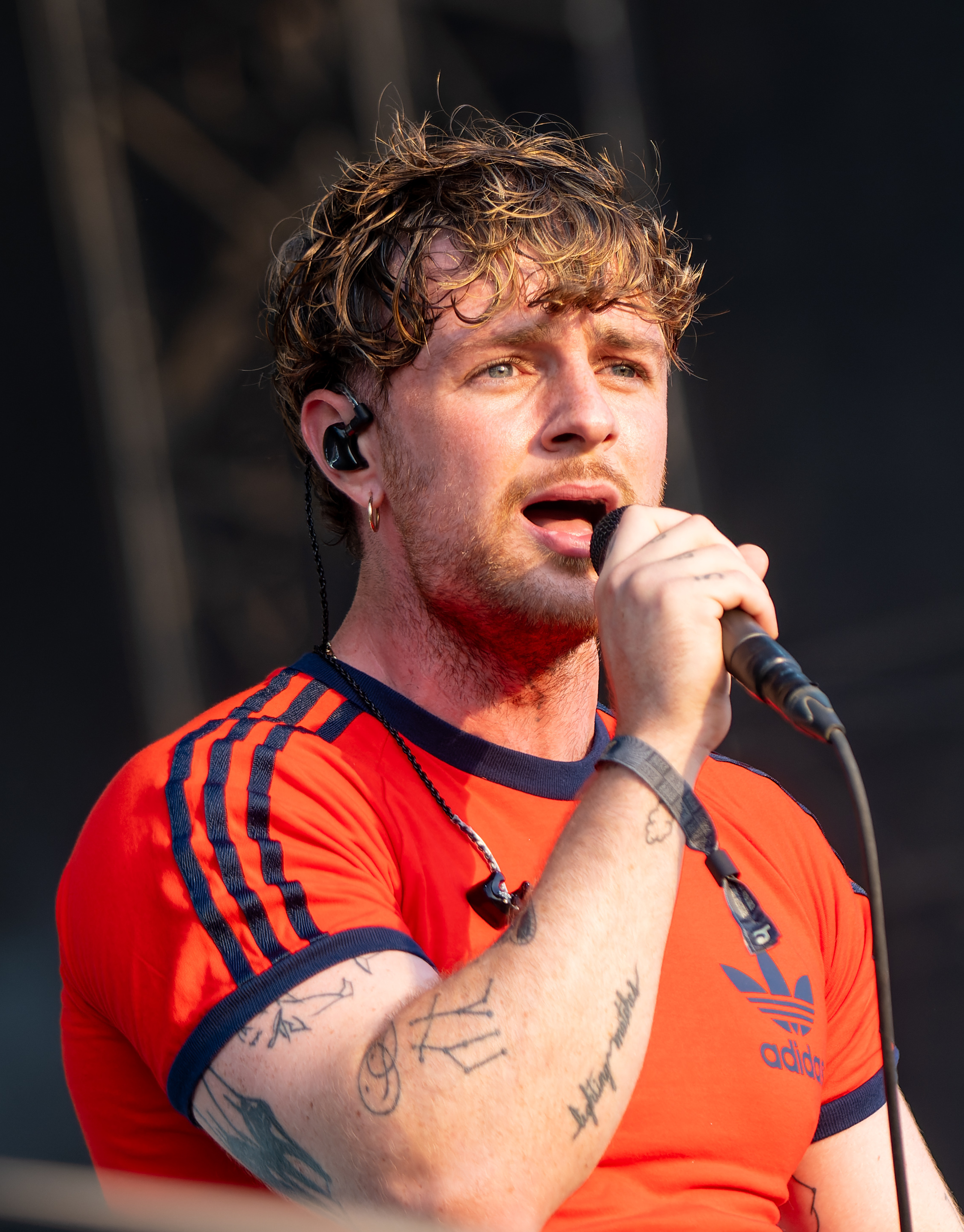
- Grennan performing in 2022
- Born: 8 June 1991 (age 35); Bedford, England
- Occupations: Singer; songwriter
- Years active: 2014–present
- Spouse: Danniella Carraturo (m. 2024)
- Children: 1
- Musical career
- Genre: Pop rock
- Label: Insanity
- Website: tomgrennanmusic.com

Thomas Grennan (born 8 June 1995) is an English singer and songwriter from Bedford. He entered the music charts in 2016 as guest vocalist on Chase & Status's "All Goes Wrong". His debut album, Lighting Matches, was released in July 2018. The album peaked at number five on the UK Albums Chart and includes the single "Found What I've Been Looking For".

Grennan's second album Evering Road was released in March 2021, beginning his breakthrough in the UK by charting at number one on the UK Albums Chart and including the commercially successful singles "This Is the Place", "Little Bit of Love", "Let's Go Home Together" with Ella Henderson and "Don't Break the Heart". In 2021 and 2022, he was also featured as a guest vocalist on the top-ten singles "By Your Side" with Calvin Harris and "Not Over Yet" with KSI. In 2023, Grennan released his third album What Ifs & Maybes, which became his second UK number one album. It included the top-forty singles "Remind Me", "All These Nights" and "Here" plus the top-twenty singles "How Does It Feel" and "Lionheart (Fearless)" with Joel Corry.

== Early life and family ==
Grennan comes from an Irish family. He attended St Thomas More Upper School in Bedford. At the age of 18, he was attacked on the street and was left with four metal plates and screws in his jaw that "still hurt when winter comes". He trained to become a professional footballer, playing for Luton Town for a while, also trying for Northampton Town and Aston Villa; he was later released. Grennan is a supporter of Coventry City and Manchester United. He also worked briefly at Costa Coffee. He told Music Week: "I was close to playing over in the States but something was telling me not to and obviously it was the music".

Grennan's musical beginnings are obscure, but he says he was at a house party where he sang "Seaside" by the Kooks. He did not remember it, but his friends were impressed and pushed him into performing more. He studied acting at St. Mary's University in Twickenham. Aged 18, he started doing gigs around London with his acoustic guitar, mainly in small pub appearances for almost three years. After a performance at the Finsbury pub, a representative of Insanity Records heard him play and offered a contract.

== Career ==
=== 2016–2018: Beginnings, EPs and debut album ===
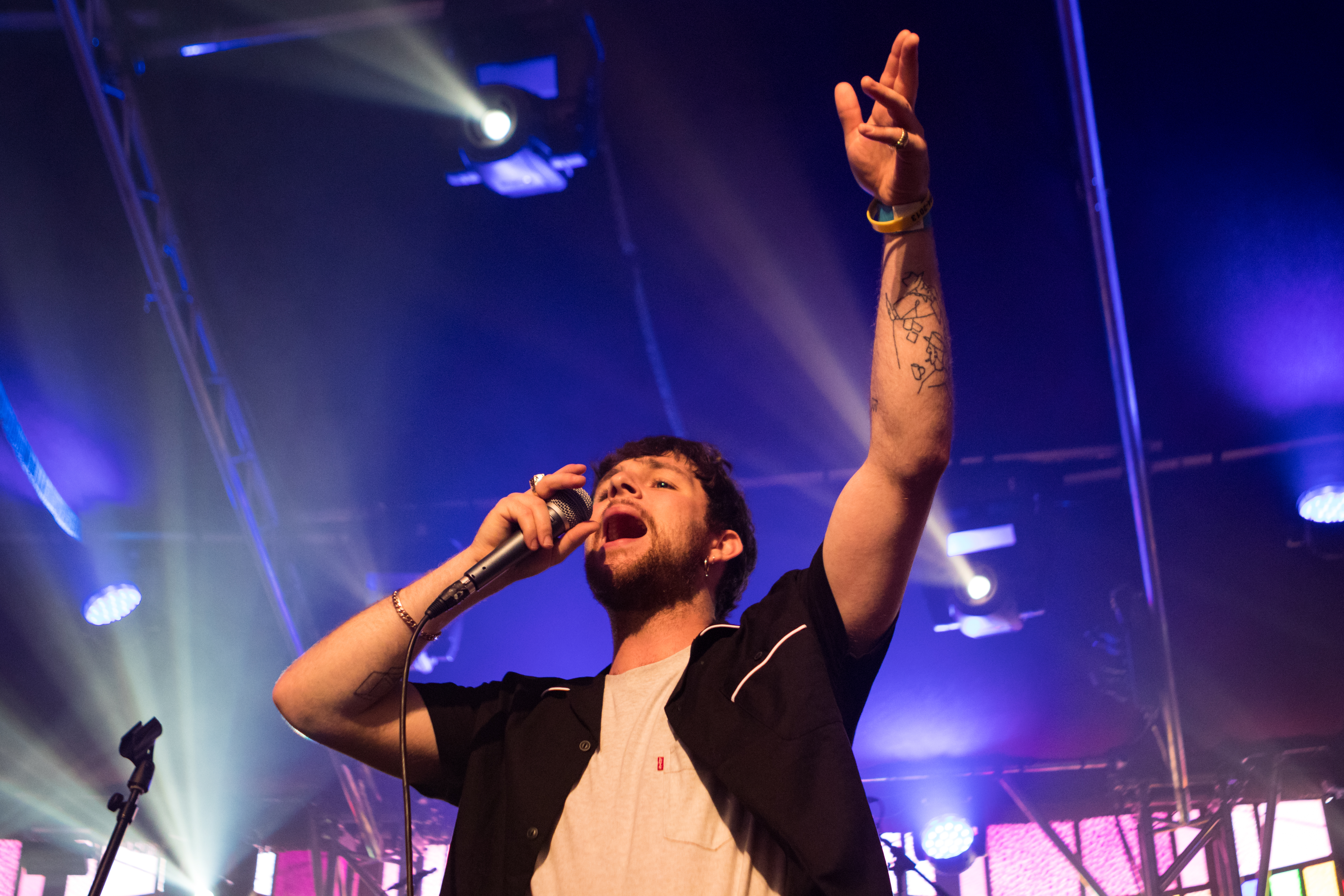
Grennan at the Haldern Pop music festival in 2017

Grennan's debut EP, Something in the Water was produced by Charlie Hugall. He had his big break when he was featured on the Chase & Status 2016 single "All Goes Wrong" that was picked as "Hottest Record" on Annie Mac's Radio 1 show. Following this, he was invited for an appearance on the station's Live Lounge, and a follow-up appearance on BBC Two's television programme Later... with Jools Holland. The song appeared on the UK singles chart, peaking at number 65.

In February 2017, Grennan was shortlisted for the MTV Brand New Award, also performing at the MTV Showcase at London's Electric Ballroom. The same year, he had a cameo appearance in Charli XCX's music video for her song "Boys", alongside many well-known artists and duetted with grime MC Bugzy Malone on "Memory Lane".

Grennan performed in Trafalgar Square during the F1 Live in London show in support of Formula One drivers. In March 2018, he embarked on a UK tour in support of his debut album Lighting Matches, later released in July 2018. To promote the album, Grennan set a Guinness World Record for the 'most concerts performed in 12 hours' across multiple towns in the UK. His song "Found What I've Been Looking For" appeared on the FIFA 18 soundtrack and was also used by Sky Sports as the theme song for Super Sunday.

=== 2020–23: Commercial breakthrough, Evering Road and What Ifs & Maybes ===
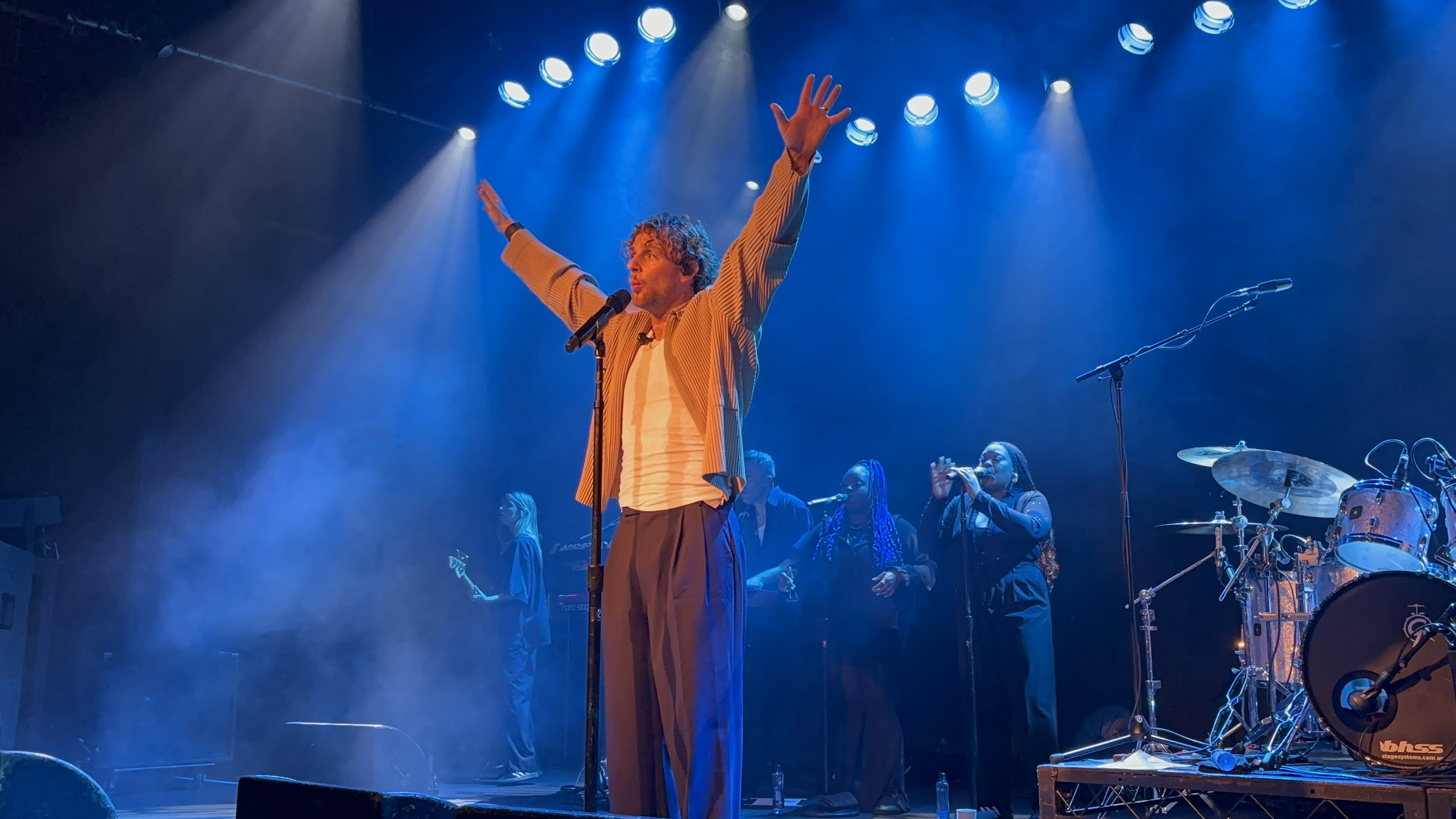
Grennan performing in Sydney, Australia in May 2024

In January 2020, Grennan released the first single "This is the Place" from his second album Evering Road. He followed this with two further singles "Oh Please" and "Amen" in the same year. His fourth single from the album, "Little Bit of Love", was released in January 2021. It earned Grennan his first top-ten single in the UK, with the song charting at number seven on the UK singles chart. The song has been awarded a Platinum certification by the BPI and has surpassed one million UK chart sales, also charting around Europe. Evering Road was later released in March 2021, topping the UK Albums Chart in its opening week and later gaining a Gold certification. He subsequently achieved another top-ten hit with "Let's Go Home Together", a collaboration with Ella Henderson which was also certified Platinum in the UK. This was followed with "By Your Side", a collaboration with Scottish DJ Calvin Harris which earned Grennan his third consecutive UK top-ten single and Platinum certification. He was also featured as a presenter on Radio 1's Future Sounds show for four nights in August and September, becoming one of the five musicians to be featured for the month of August, alongside Olly Alexander, Arlo Parks, Yungblud and Charli XCX.

In February 2022, Grennan received two Brit Awards nominations, including British Song of the Year for "Little Bit of Love" and Best Rock/Alternative Act. In March 2022, Grennan released the first single from his third album "Remind Me", which charted at number 27 in the UK. In July 2022, he released "All These Nights". In August 2022, Grennan featured on KSI's "Not Over Yet". The collaboration debuted at number one on The Sky VIP Official Big Top 40, and debuted at number four in the UK, becoming Grennan's fourth top-ten hit and his highest charting song to date.

Grennan released his third album What Ifs & Maybes in June 2023, which was supported by a UK arena tour that began in March 2023.

=== 2024–present: Everywhere I Went, Led Me to Where I Didn't Want to Be ===
On 13 September 2024, Grennan announced the song "Higher" which was released on 20 September 2024. In May 2025, Grennan began co-hosting a podcast with his friend Roman Kemp on BBC Sounds called You About?. Grennan's fourth studio album, Everywhere I Went, Led Me to Where I Didn't Want to Be, was released on 15 August 2025. On 29th August 2025 Grennan performed a "Final Night Of Tour Rehearsals" show at the Coventry Building Society Arena. On 24 April 2026 Coventry City Football Club announced Grennan would be performing at the We Are Back: Live event at the War Memorial Park, Coventryon 4 May 2026.

== Personal life ==
He has dyslexia. Grennan has spoken about his mental health struggles, including anxiety disorder, attention deficit hyperactivity disorder, and suffering from body dysmorphia.

During an interview with CALM in 2021, Grennan revealed that when he was 18 he was attacked by a group of strangers. After the attack, he could not leave his house and the event caused him suicidal thoughts after he experienced a "massive depression". A year later, in April 2022, Grennan was beaten and robbed after a performance in Manhattan, NYC. He suffered a ruptured ear and torn ear-drum and postponed an upcoming show in Washington, D.C.

During an interview with Rolling Stone Australia in 2022, Grennan confirmed his engagement to Italian pilates instructor Danniella Carraturo. They married in May 2024. In 2025, the couple had a daughter.

== Advocacy ==
Grennan has used his platform to advocate for people's access to mental-health resources, against toxic masculinity, and in support of the LGBTQ+ community.

In 2021, Grennan became an ambassador for the ‘Making Me’ charity in Bedford, which encourages young people, as well children, to stay ‘mentally fit’ through knowledge and resources. In 2022, Grennan partnered with the National Health Service of England on their mental-health campaign which empowers those struggling with mental-health issues to seek support.

In May 2025, Grennan was among the musicians who signed an open letter pledging "solidarity with the trans, non-binary and intersex communities" and condemning the April 2025 Supreme Court ruling on the definition of woman in the Equality Act and subsequent EHRC guidance.

== Discography ==
Studio albums

- Lighting Matches (2018)
- Evering Road (2021)
- What Ifs & Maybes (2023)
- Everywhere I Went, Led Me to Where I Didn't Want to Be (2025)

== Awards and nominations ==
Awards and nominations received by Tom Grennan
Year	Organization	Award	Work	Result	Ref.
2016	MTV	Brand New for 2017	Himself	Included	
2016	BBC	Sound of 2017	Himself	Included	
2016	Ticketweb	Ones to Watch 2017	Himself	Included	
2017	BBC Radio 1	Hottest Record of the Year	"Found What I've Been Looking For"	Tenth	
2018	Q Awards	Best Breakthrough Act	Himself	Nominated	
2018	Radio X	Best Songs of 2018	"Found What I've Been Looking For"	Included	
2018	Global	Rising Star Award	Himself	Nominated	
2018	Global	Best Indie	Himself	Nominated	
2019	Pop Awards	Emerging Artist of the Year	Himself	Nominated	
2022	Brit Awards	Song of the Year	"Little Bit of Love"	Nominated	
2022	Brit Awards	Best Rock/Alternative Act	Himself	Nominated	
2023	Brit Awards	Best Rock/Alternative Act	Himself	Nominated	
2023	MTV EMAs	Best UK Act	Himself	Won	
2023	Electronic Dance Music Awards	Music Video of The Year	"Lionheart (Fearless)" (Note: (shared with Joel Corry))	Nominated	
2024	Global	Best Song	"How Does It Feel"	Nominated	
2024	Global	Best Male	Himself	Nominated	
2024	Global	Best British Act	Himself	Nominated	
2025	Music Week Awards	Music & Brand Partnership	"The Best A Man Can Get" (Note: (shared with Gillete, Various Artists Management, Sony/4th Floor Creative and Insanity))	Won	
2025	British Phonographic Industry	Brit Billion Award	Himself	Won	
2026	Electronic Dance Music Awards	Best Collaboration	"Forever" (Note: (shared with Illenium and Alna))	Nominated	
2026	Electronic Dance Music Awards	Pop-Dance Anthem of the Year	"Forever"	Won	

=== Listicles ===
Publisher	Year	Listicle	Result	Ref.
Forbes	2024	30 Under 30: Entertainment (Europe)	Placed	
