= Jamie Scott discography =

This is the discography of English singer, songwriter and producer Jamie Scott.

== As songwriter ==
Discography
Year	Artist	Album	Song	Writers
2026	Take That ft Michael Patrick Kelly		Feel My Love	Scott, Kelly, Barlow, Owen, Donald, Needle
2026	Sebastian Schub		haven't found love.	Scott, Schub, Moffat, Hume
2026	Niall Horan	Dinner Party	Monochromatic	Scott, Horan, Ryan, Bunetta, Franzino, Haas
2026	Niall Horan	Dinner Party	Better Man	Scott, Horan, Ryan, Bunetta, Franzino, Haas
2026	Niall Horan	Dinner Party	Boys Are Fun	Scott, Horan, Ryan, Bunetta, Franzino, Haas
2026	Niall Horan	Dinner Party	Fighting over Nothing	Scott, Horan, Ryan, Bunetta, Franzino, Haas
2026	Niall Horan	Dinner Party	Pretty	Scott, Horan, Ryan, Bunetta, Franzino, Haas
2026	Niall Horan	Dinner Party	Die If I Don't	Scott, Horan, Ryan, Bunetta, Franzino, Haas
2026	Myles Smith	My Mess, My Heart, My Life	Hold Me In The Dark	Scott, Smith, Plested, Simon
2026	Take That		You're a Superstar	Scott, Barlow, Owen Donald
2026	Niall Horan	Dinner Party	Dinner Party	Scott, Horan, Ryan, Bunetta, Franzino, Haas
2026	Louis Tomlinson	How Did I Get Here?	Sunflowers	Scott, Tomlinson, Wang, Hutchcraft
2026	Louis Tomlinson	How Did I Get Here?	Lazy	Scott, Tomlinson, Wang, Hutchcraft
2026	Louis Tomlinson	How Did I Get Here?	All These Skies	Scott, Tomlinson, Wang, Hutchcraft
2025	Matteo Bocelli		Lost This Christmas	Scott, Bocelli, Needle, Bryer
2024	Cian Ducrot		Can't Even Hate You	Scott, Ducrot
2024	Only The Poets	One More Night	It's Okay (To Not Be Okay)	Scott, Jack, Longhurst
2024	Cheat Codes, Jason Derulo, De la Ghetto, Galantis		Morning	Scott, Caceres, Karlsson, Blume, Fleur, Inglesias, Derulo, Izquierdo, Jimenez, Muy, Pederson, Elifritz, Needle, Kofman, Morales, Torres, Boardman, Dahl
2024	Liam Payne		Teardrops	Scott, Bryer, Chasez, Needle, Payne
2023	Caity Baser		I Love Making Bad Boys Cry	Scott, Britten, Needle, Baser
2023	Tom Grennan	What Ifs & Maybes	This Side Of The Room	Scott, Grennan, Bryer, Needle
2023	Niall Horan	The Show	The Show	Scott, Horan, Needle, Bryer
2023	Niall Horan	The Show	Science	Scott, Horan, Needle, Bryer
2023	Nico Santos	Ride	Real Love	Scott, Needle, Santos, Bryer, James
2023	Nico Santos	Ride	City Nights	Scott, Needle, Santos, Miller, Boardman
2023	Tom Grennan		How Does It Feel	Scott, Tighe, Green, Falk, Payne, Grennan, Mann
2023	Berwyn		Bulletproof	Scott, Coffer, Ash, Du Bois
2022	Sigma	Hope	Climb	Scott, Kenzie
2022	Tom Grennan		You Are Not Alone	Scott, Needle, Grennan
2022	New Rules		Late In The Evening	Scott
2022	Joel Corry & Tom Grennan		Lionheart (Fearless)	Scott, Corry, Thompson, Needle, Mojave, Applebaum, Gale, Grennan
2022	Tom Grennan		All These Nights	Scott, Needle, Boardman, Grennan
2022	James Bay	Leap	Brilliant Still	Scott, Bay, Coffer
2022	New Rules	Go The Distance	Love You Like That	Scott, McGarry, Michaelson, Lambert, Meaney
2022	Bow Anderson		Mama Said	Scott, Anderson
2022	Kamal		Nowhere To Hide	Scott, Mooncie, Coffer, Kamal
2022	JP Cooper	She	Pretender	Scott, Cooper, Phillips
2022	JP Cooper	She	Kids	Scott, Cooper, Needle, Bryer
2022	JP Cooper	She	She	Scott, Cooper, Needle, Bryer
2022	JP Cooper ft Ray Blk	She	Need You Tonight	Scott, Cooper, Needle, Bryer
2021	Tom Gregory	Things I Can't Say Out Loud	Careless War	Scott, Gregory, Needle, Humphrey
2021	Tom Gregory	Things I Can't Say Out Loud	Love Come Get Me	Scott, Gregory, Humphrey
2021	Westlife	Wild Dreams	Starlight	Scott, Shane Filan, Mark Feehily, Grennan, Bryer, Rycroft, Needle
2021	Westlife	Wild Dreams	Magic	Scott, Feehily, Filan, Tom Williams, Alexander Charles
2021	Tom Gregory	Things I Can't Say Out Loud	Footprints	Scott, Gregory, Coffer, Sanders, Humphrey
2021	Nico & Vinz ft. Bow Anderson	Don't Be Afraid	Don't Be Afraid	Scott, Anderson, Vlasenko, Meinke, Chacon, Kalisch, Sereba, Dery
2021	Jax Jones ft. System.Inc	Deep Joy	Paris	Scott, Coffer, Lam, Whittfield
2021	Calvin Harris ft. Tom Grennan		By Your Side	Scott, Wiles, Grennan, Needle, Hutchcraft, Newman
2021	Afrojack, David Guetta		Hero	Scott, Guetta, Goulding, Tedder, de Wall, Eriksen, Hermansen
2021	Bow Anderson		Hate That I Fell In Love With You	Scott, Anderson, Needle, Bryer
2021	Tom Gregory	Things I Can't Say Out Loud	River	Scott, Gregory, Boardman, Sanders, Humphrey
2021	Birdy		Loneliness	Scott, Birdy
2021	Bow Anderson	New Wave EP	New Wave	Scott, Anderson, Needle, Bryer, Coffer, Sanders, Burns
2021	Bow Anderson	New Wave EP	Black Heart	Scott, Anderson, Needle
2020	New Rules		My Guitar	Scott, Coffer, Lambert, McGarry, Meaney
2020	Bow Anderson	New Wave EP	Island	Scott, Bryer, Needle, Anderson
2020	Bow Anderson	New Wave EP	Heavy	Scott, Bryer, Needle, Anderson
2020	Kygo	Golden Hour	To Die For	Scott, Dahl, Martin, Mair, Langley, Kennedy, Kozmeniuk
2020	Ellie Goulding	Brightest Blue	Power	Scott, Coffer, Goulding, Paich, Tarrant, Taylor, Gale
2020	Mabes		Slow Drowning	Scott, Rogers
2020	Bow Anderson	New Wave EP	Sweater	Scott, Anderson, Coffer
2020	Niall Horan	Heartbreak Weather	Heartbreak Weather	Scott, Bunetta, Ryan, Horan
2020	Niall Horan	Heartbreak Weather	Small Talk	Scott, Bryer, Needle, Conrad, Horan
2020	Niall Horan	Heartbreak Weather	Put a Little Love on Me	Scott, Bryer, Needle, Horan
2020	Niall Horan	Heartbreak Weather	Arms Of A Stranger	Scott, Bryer, Needle, Horan
2020	Niall Horan	Heartbreak Weather	Still	Scott, Bryer, Needle, Horan
2020	Hudson Taylor	Loving Everywhere I Go	Back To You	Scott, Hudson-Taylor
2020	Elias	HIM	Need You Now	Scott, Sahlin, Skarbek
2020	Louis Tomlinson	Walls	Perfect Now	Scott, Tomlinson, Carlsson, Hector
2020	JP Cooper	Too Close	In These Arms	Scott, Bryer, Needle, Cooper
2019	Niall Horan		Put a Little Love on Me	Scott, Bryer, Horan, Needle
2019	John The Blind		Bottle Of Pills	Scott, Ryan, Bunneta
2019	Jamie Lawson	The Years In Between	Dance In The Dark	Scott, Lawson
2019	Christopher	Under The Surface	My Heart	Scott, Nissen
2019	Christopher	Under The Surface	The Chancer	Scott, Nissen
2019	Christopher	Under The Surface	Just Kiss Me	Scott, Hill, Nissen
2018	Tory Lanez	Memories Don't Die	Hate To Say	Scott, Bunetta, Ryan, Peterson, Gonzalez, Griffin, Williams
2018	Tor Miller	Surviving The Suburbs	We Both Want To	Scott, Miller
2018	Jess Glynne	Always in Between	Broken	Scott, Glynne, Coffer
2018	Jess Glynne	Always in Between	Never Let Me Go	Scott, Bunetta, Glynne, Ryan
2018	Albin Lee Meldau	About You	Til The Sun Comes Around Again	Scott, Meldau
2018	Albin Lee Meldau	About You	6th Street	Scott, Langebaek, Meldau
2018	Keith Urban	Graffiti U	Horses	Scott, Rad, MoZella
2018	The Beach	Non-album single	Glass Houses	Scott, Morgan, Coffer
2018	Royal Wood	Ever After The Farewell	Nightingale	Scott, Royal Wood
2018	Royal Wood	Ever After The Farewell	Something About You	Scott, Royal Wood
2018	Royal Wood	Ever After The Farewell	Made of Gold	Scott, Bryer, Needle, Royal Wood
2018	Royal Wood	Ever After The Farewell	Hardest Thing of All	Scott, Royal Wood
2018	Royal Wood	Ever After The Farewell	Old Young Love	Scott, Bryer, Needle, Royal Wood
2018	Ady Suleiman	Memories	Loving Arms	Scott, Suleiman
2018	Rudimental, Jess Glynne, Macklemore, Dan Caplen	Toast to Our Differences	These Days	Scott, Ryan, Bunetta, Caplen, Rudimental, Macklemore
2018	Calum Scott	Only Human	Hotel Room	Scott, Scott, Sanders
2017	Martin Garrix & David Guetta feat. Jamie Scott & Romy Dya	7	So Far Away	Scott, Guetta, Garrix, Tuinfort, Pooh Bear
2017	Jessie Ware	Glasshouses	Finished What We Started	Scott, Ware, Ryan, Bunetta
2017	Hurts	Desire	Hold On To Me	Scott, Hurts
2017	Niall Horan	Flicker	Mirrors	Scott, Horan, Bryer, Needle
2017	Niall Horan	Flicker	This Town	Scott, Horan, Bryer, Needle
2017	Niall Horan	Flicker	Too Much to Ask	Scott, Horan
2017	River Matthews	Imogen	Stars	Matthews, Scott
2017	River Matthews	Imogen	Catherine	Matthews, Scott
2017	River Matthews	Imogen	Over	Matthews, Scott, Needle
2017	River Matthews	Imogen	Feels Like Morning	Matthews, Scott, Needle
2017	River Matthews	Imogen	Undo Ordinary	Matthews, Scott, Needle
2017	Rag 'n' Bone Man	Human	Skin	Scott, Graham, Coffer, Needle, Bryer
2017	Rag 'n' Bone Man	Human	Arrow	Scott, Graham, Coffer
2017	Rag 'n' Bone Man	Human	Be The Man	Scott, Graham, Coffer
2017	Rag 'n' Bone Man	Human	As You Are	Scott, Graham, Coffer
2017	The Beach	Non-album single	Bite My Tongue	Scott, Morgan, Coffer, Ryan, Bunetta
2017	Nelly Furtado	The Ride	Sticks and Stones	Scott, Mascall, Taylor, Arlissa, Furtado
2016	Birdy	Beautiful Lies	Lights	Scott, Birdy
2016	Tom Odell	Wrong Crowd	Silhouette	Scott, Odell
2016	Jessie Ware	Me Before You (Soundtrack)	Till The End	Scott, Ware, Skarbek, Okumu
2016	The Beach	Non-album single	Geronimo	Scott, Morgan, Bryer, Needle,
2016	Ady Suleiman	Ady Suleiman	Wait For You	Scott, Coffer, Suleiman
2016	Major Lazer feat Justin Bieber and MØ	Music Is the Weapon	Cold Water	Scott, Sheeran, Blanco, Bieber, Major Lazer
2016	Izzy Bizu	A Moment of Madness	Glorious	Scott, Bizu, Barter
2016	Niall Horan	Flicker	This Town	Scott, Horan, Needle, Bryer
2016	Crystal Fighters	Everything Is My Family	Good Girl	Scott, Coffer, Crystal Fighters
2015	Gavin James	Bitter Pill	Bitter Pill	Scott, Skarbek, James
2015	One Direction	Made in the A.M.	Hey Angel	Scott, Bunetta, Ryan, Drewett
2015	One Direction	Made in the A.M.	Drag Me Down	Scott, Bunetta, Ryan
2015	One Direction	Made in the A.M.	Infinity	Scott, Bunetta, Ryan
2015	One Direction	Perfect EP	Home	Scott, Payne, Tomlinson
2015	One Direction	Made in the A.M.	Never Enough	Scott, Ryan, Bunetta, Horan
2015	One Direction	Made in the A.M.	What a Feeling	Scott, Bryer, Needle, Payne, Tomlinson
2015	One Direction	Made in the A.M.	Long Way Down	Scott, Bunetta, Ryan
2015	One Direction	Made in the A.M.	Walking in the Wind	Scott, Bunetta, Ryan, Syles
2015	Hometown	Hometown	Roses	Scott, Taylor, Cardle
2015	Hometown	Hometown	The Night We Met	Scott, MoZella, Rad, Payne
2015	Hometown	Hometown	Standing in the Rain	Scott, David
2015	Luhan	Reloaded	Medals	Scott, Squires, Needle,
2014	The Vamps	The Vamps	Wild Heart	Scott, Bjorklund, Lind, Harrison, Asmar, McVey, Ball, Evans, Simpson
2014	Christina Perri feat Ed Sheeran	Head or Heart	Be My Forever	Scott, Perri
2014	Christina Perri feat Ed Sheeran	Head or Heart	Shot Me in the Heart	Scott, Perri
2014	Colbie Caillat	Gypsy Heart (Side A)	If You Love Me, Let Me Go	Scott, Caillat, Bunetta, Ryan
2014	Ella Henderson	Chapter One	All Again	Scott, Henderson
2014	Marsha Ambrosius	Friends & Lovers	Love	Scott, Ambrosius
2014	Alex & Sierra	It's About Us	Back To You	Scott, Kinsey, Deaton
2014	One Direction	Four	Fireproof	Scott, Ryan, Bunetta, Tomlinson, Payne
2014	One Direction	Four	Ready to Run	Scott, Bunetta, Ryan, Tomlinson, Payne
2014	One Direction	Four	Fool's Gold	Scott, Horan, Mozella, Styles, Tomlinson, Payne, Malik
2014	One Direction	Four	Night Changes	Scott, Bunetta, Horan, Ryan, Styles, Tomlinson
2014	One Direction	Four	No Control	Cunningham, Scott, Bunetta, Ryan, Tomlinson, Payne
2014	One Direction	Four	Spaces	Scott, Bunetta, Ryan, Tomlinson, Payne
2014	One Direction	Four	Clouds	Scott, Bunetta, Ryan, Tomlinson, Payne, Malik
2014	One Direction	Four	Illusion	Scott, Bunetta, Ryan, Payne
2014	One Direction	Four	Once In a Lifetime	Scott, Bunetta, Ryan
2014	Olly Murs	Never Been Better	Why Do I Love You	Scott, Murs, Barnes, Keller, Bohn
2014	Olly Murs	Never Been Better	Ready For Love	Scott, Murs, Prime
2014	Olly Murs	Never Been Better	Us Against The World	Scott, Murs, Smith
2014	Hometown	Hometown	Where I Belong	Scott, Garrigan, Predergast, May
2014	Union J	You Got It All – The Album	She's In My Head	Scott, Hartman
2013	One Direction	Midnight Memories	Story of My Life	Scott, Bunetta, Ryan, Horan, Malik, Payne, Styles, Tomlinson
2013	One Direction	Midnight Memories	Diana	Scott, Ryan, Bunetta, Tomlinson, Payne
2013	One Direction	Midnight Memories	Midnight Memories	Scott, Ryan, Bunetta, Tomlinson, Payne
2013	One Direction	Midnight Memories	You & I	Scott, Bunetta, Ryan
2013	One Direction	Midnight Memories	Strong	Scott, Ryan, Bunetta, Tomlinson
2013	One Direction	Midnight Memories	Through the Dark	Scott, Smith, Tomlinson, Payne
2013	One Direction	Midnight Memories	Better Than Words	Scott, Ryan, Bunetta, Tomlinson, Payne
2013	One Direction	Midnight Memories	Alive	Scott, Ryan, Bunetta, Tomlinson
2013	One Direction	Midnight Memories	Does He Know?	Scott, Ryan, Bunetta, Tomlinson, Payne
2013	Marcus Collins	Marcus Collins	Love & Hate	Scott, Taylor, Collins, Mascall
2013	Marcus Collins	Marcus Collins	Don't Surrender	Scott, Collins, Meehan
2013	Marcus Collins	Marcus Collins	Break These Chains	Scott, Collins, Meehan
2013	Arlissa	Battles	Sticks & Stones	Scott, Mascall, Taylor, Arlissa
2013	Arlissa	Battles	Braveheart	Scott
2013	NKOTB	10	Jealous (Blue)	Scott, Jensen, Larsson
2013	5 Seconds of Summer	Non-album single	Over and Over	Scott, Hood, Hemmings
2013	Matt Cardle & Melanie C	Porcelain	Loving You	Scott, Cardle, Ashurst, Talbot, Chrisholm
2013	Matt Cardle	Porcelain	When You Were My Girl	Scott, Cardle, Talbot, Smith, Chasez, Harry
2013	Little Mix	Salute	Towers	Scott, Shortland, Forre
2012	One Direction	Take Me Home	C'mon, C'mon	Scott, Bunetta, Ryan
2012	One Direction	Take Me Home	She's Not Afraid	Scott, Bunetta, Ryan, Wood
2011	Michael Kiwanuka	Home Again	Home Again	Scott, Kiwanuka
2011	Michael Kiwanuka	Home Again	Bones	Scott, Kiwanuka
2011	One Direction	Up All Night	Stole My Heart	Scott, Meehan
2011	One Direction	Up All Night	More Than This	Scott
2010	Dane Bowers	Non-album single	All She Needs	Scott
2010	Emin	Wonder	Obvious	Scott, Phillips, Agalarov, Mascall, Meehan
2010	Emin	Wonder	Wonder	Scott, Agalarov
2010	Emin	Wonder	One Last Dance	Scott, Stack
2010	Emin	Wonder	Hold You in My Arms	Scott, Agalarov, Meehan
2009	Enrique Iglesias feat. Nicole Scherzinger	Euphoria	Heartbeat	Scott, Iglesias, Taylor
2009	Enrique Iglesias	Euphoria	Coming Home	Scott, Iglesias, Taylor
2008	JLS	JLS	Don't Go	Scott, Gill, Williams, Merrygold, Humes, Stack

== As producer ==
Discography
Year	Artist	Album	Song	Producers
2026	Dylan		to love and to lose	Scott, Wang, Blackwell
2026	Take That		Feel My Love	Scott, Hannah, Lapidot, Kelly, Ilbert
2026	Take That		You're a Superstar	Scott, Hannah, Price
2024	Cian Ducrot		Can't Even Hate You	Scott, Ducrot, Goransson
2024	Only The Poets	One More Night	It's Okay (To Not Be Okay)	Scott, Jack, Hannah
2024	Liam Payne		Teardrops	Scott, Bryer, Hannah
2023	Caity Baser		I Love Making Bad Boys Cry	Scott, Hannah
2023	Tom Grennan	What Ifs & Maybes	This Side Of The Room	Scott, Hannah
2022	Tom Grennan		You Are Not Alone	Scott
2022	Bow Anderson		Mama Said	Scott
2022	JP Cooper	She	She	Scott, Bryer, Saltwives
2022	JP Cooper	She	Need You Tonight	Scott, Bryer, Saltwives
2021	Westlife	Wild Dreams	Starlight	Scott, Lostboy
2021	Westlife	Wild Dreams	Magic	Scott
2021	Bow Anderson		Hate That I Fell In Love With You	Scott, Green
2021	Bow Anderson	New Wave EP	New Wave	Scott, Coffer
2021	Bow Anderson	New Wave EP	Black Heart	Scott
2021	Tom Grennan		A Little Bit Of Love	Scott, Bryer, Lostboy
2020	New Rules		My Guitar	Scott, Coffer, Palmer
2020	Bow Anderson	New Wave EP	Island	Scott, Coffer
2020	Bow Anderson	New Wave EP	Heavy	Scott, Coffer
2020	Ellie Goulding	Brightest Blue	Power	Scott, Coffer
2020	Bow Anderson	New Wave EP	Sweater	Scott, Coffer, Spence, Wells
2020	Niall Horan	Heartbreak Weather	Small Talk	Scott, Bryer, Conrad
2020	Niall Horan	Heartbreak Weather	Put a Little Love on Me	Scott, Bryer
2020	Niall Horan	Heartbreak Weather	Still	Scott, Bryer
2020	Hudson Taylor	Loving Everywhere I Go	Back To You	Scott, Rausch
2020	Elias	HIM	Need You Now	Scott
2020	Louis Tomlinson	Walls	Perfect Now	Scott, Carlsson
2020	JP Cooper		In These Arms	Scott, Shux
2019	Niall Horan		Put a Little Love on Me	Scott, Bryer
2019	Westlife	Spectrum	Another Life	Scott, Charles
2019	Jamie Lawson	The Years In Between	Dance In The Dark	Scott, Potashnick
2019	Christopher	Under The Surface	My Heart	Scott, Potashnick
2019	Christopher	Under The Surface	The Chancer	Scott, Potashnick
2019	Christopher	Under The Surface	Kiss Me Baby	Scott, Potashnick
2017	Rag 'n' Bone Man	Human	Skin	Scott, Coffer
2017	Rag 'n' Bone Man	Human	Arrow	Scott, Coffer
2017	Rag 'n' Bone Man	Human	Be The Man	Scott, Coffer
2017	Rag 'n' Bone Man	Human	As You Are	Scott, Coffer
2016	Birdy	Beautiful Lies	Lights	Scott
2016	Jessie Ware	Me Before You Soundtrack	Till the End	Scott
2016	The Beach		Geronimo	Scott, Bryer
2015	One Direction	Perfect EP	Home	Scott
2015	One Direction	Made in the A.M.	What A Feeling	Scott
2015	Hometown	Hometown	Roses	Scott, Smith
2015	Hometown	Hometown	The Night We Met	Scott, Needle
2015	Hometown	Hometown	Standing in the Rain	Scott, Smith
2014	Ella Henderson	Chapter One	All Again	Scott, Smith
2014	Ella Henderson	Chapter One	Missed	Scott
2014	Marsha Ambrosius	Friends & Lovers	Love	Scott
2014	Alex & Sierra	It's About Us	Back to You	Scott
2014	Olly Murs	Never Been Better	Us Against The World	Scott, Smith, Rad
2014	One Direction	Four	Fools Gold	Scott, Rad
2014	Hometown		Where I Belong	Scott, Smith
2013	One Direction	Midnight Memories	Through the Dark	Scott, Smith, Ryan
2013	Matt Cardle & Melanie C	Porcelain	Loving You	Scott, Cardle, Smith
2013	Matt Cardle	Porcelain	When You Were My Girl	Scott, Cardle, Smith

== Albums ==
=== Solo ===
2005: Soul Searching' (unreleased)
No.	Title	Length
1.	"Searching"	X:XX
2.	"Love Song To Remember"	X:XX
3.	"Just"	X:XX
4.	"Hooks in Me"	X:XX
5.	"Shameful"	X:XX
6.	"Best of Me"	X:XX
7.	"Soul"	X:XX
8.	"45"	X:XX
9.	"River"	X:XX
10.	"Everything Woman"	X:XX
11.	"Troubled Mind"	X:XX

2014: My Hurricane
No.	Title	Length
1.	"Lights"	1:30
2.	"Gold" (featuring Christina Perri)	3:48
3.	"My Hurricane"	4:12
4.	"Unbreakable"	4:25
5.	"The Nights Gonna Trick Me Again"	2:48
6.	"Carry You Home"	4:01
7.	"Crazy For Loving Me"	3:01
8.	"Ebony Eyes"	4:38
9.	"Lady West"	2:59
10.	"Driving"	3:36
11.	"Bloodstains & Movies" (featuring Ron Sexsmith)	2:06
12.	"Heaven's Gates"	4:37

2020: How Still The River

No.	Title	Length
1.	"This Time Lucky"	04:05
2.	"Emily"	04:02
3.	"New York Nights"	02:35
4.	"I Never Want To Hurt Again Like This"	03:38
5.	"While The Band Keeps Playing On"	03:12
6.	"Friendly Fire"	05:06
7.	"Bottle Of Pills"	03:22
8.	"Fool's Gold"	03:22
9.	"Feel So Good"	03:37
10.	"Song For A Friend"	04:13
11.	"I Was There"	03:01

=== Jamie Scott and The Town ===
2007: Park Bench Theories
No.	Title	Length
1.	"Runaway Train"	4:30
2.	"When Will I See Your Face Again"	4:22
3.	"London Town"	3:01
4.	"Changes"	4:43
5.	"Shadows"	5:29
6.	"Standing in the Rain"	4:11
7.	"Love Song To Remember"	2:57
8.	"Weeping Willow"	5:23
9.	"Two Men"	4:54
10.	"Rise Up"	4:08
11.	"Hey You"	3:41
12.	"Lady West"	3:51

2007: iTunes Festival Live: Jamie Scott & The Town
No.	Title	Length
1.	"Weeping Willow"	5:23
2.	"Smile"	3:40
3.	"Runaway Train"	4:35
4.	"When Will I See Your Face Again"	4:31
5.	"Olivia"	4:23
6.	"Shadows"	6:21
7.	"Standing in the Rain"	4:29

=== Graffiti6 ===
2010: Stone in My Heart (EP)
No.	Title	Length
1.	"Stone in My Heart"	3:13
2.	"Stop Mary"	3:49
3.	"Foxes"	6:29
4.	"Starlight"	3:31

2010: Colours
No.	Title	Length
1.	"Stone in My Heart"	3:08
2.	"Annie You Save Me"	3:42
3.	"Stare into The Sun"	3:56
4.	"This Man"	5:42
5.	"Free"	4:42
6.	"Calm the Storm"	5:32
7.	"Colours"	5:17
8.	"Goodbye Geoffrey Drake"	4:16
9.	"Never Look Back"	3:27
10.	"Stop Mary"	3:50
11.	"Lay Me Down"	4:14
12.	"Over You"	4:29

2014: The Bridge
No.	Title	Length
1.	"Beside You (Intro)"	1:34
2.	"The Bridge"	4:17
3.	"U Got the Sunshine"	4:12
4.	"Settle for Your Love"	4:08
5.	"Washed My Sins"	3:54
6.	"Under the Mask"	3:21
7.	"Angels & Devils"	4:08
8.	"Losing My Mind"	5:08
9.	"Separate Lives"	5:14
10.	"We Fall Forever"	4:30
11.	"Resting Place"	5:33
12.	"No Snow"	3:44
13.	"Beside You"	6:47
14.	"Vocoda Orange"	3:29
15.	"Diamonds & Pearls"	4:20

== Singles ==
- 2004: "Just"
- 2005: "Searching"
- 2007: "When Will I See Your Face Again"
- 2008: "Standing in the Rain"
- 2015: "Unbreakable"
- 2015: "My Hurricane"
- 2017: "So Far Away" (Martin Garrix and David Guetta featuring Jamie Scott and Romy Dya)
- 2020: "Friendly Fire"
- 2020: "Emily"
- 2020: "This Time Lucky"
- 2020: "New York Nights"
