= List of UK top-ten singles in 2021 =

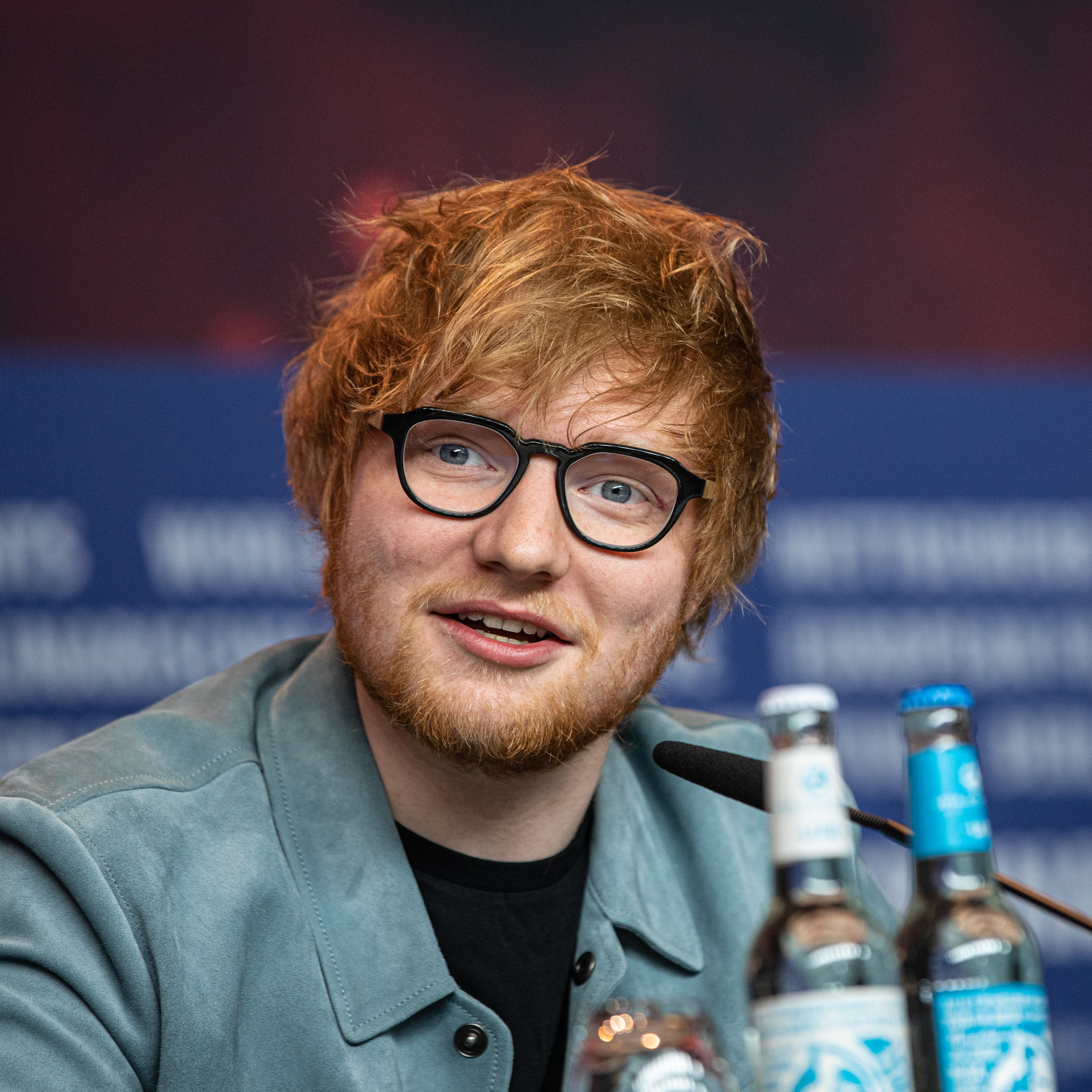
Ed Sheeran achieved a total of seven top 10 singles in 2021, the most of any artist during the year. Sheeran occupied the top spot of the UK chart for fifteen consecutive weeks between July and October with the singles "Bad Habits" (which became the year's best-selling single) and "Shivers". In December, his festive collaboration with Elton John, "Merry Christmas", entered the chart at number-one, and was knocked off the top spot two weeks later by Sheeran and John's collaboration with LadBaby, "Sausage Rolls for Everyone", which became the 70th UK Christmas number-one single.

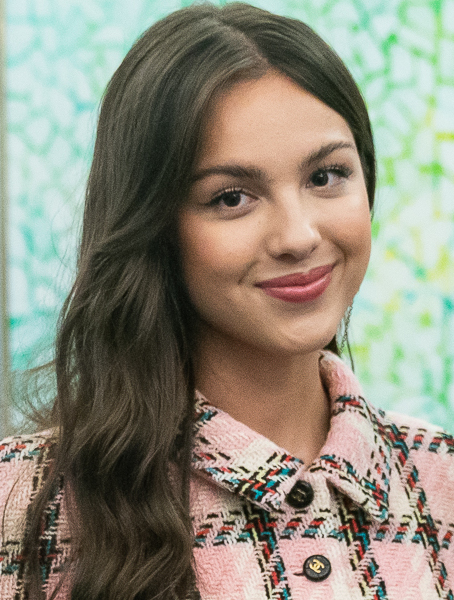
Olivia Rodrigo was this year's breakthrough artist, achieving four top 10 entries, including the number-one hits "Drivers License" and "Good 4 U", which both feature in the list of this year's top 10 best-selling singles. Rodrigo also became the youngest solo artist to achieve the coveted UK chart double after "Good 4 U" climbed to number-one in the UK Singles Chart in the same week her debut album Sour entered the UK Albums Chart at number-one.

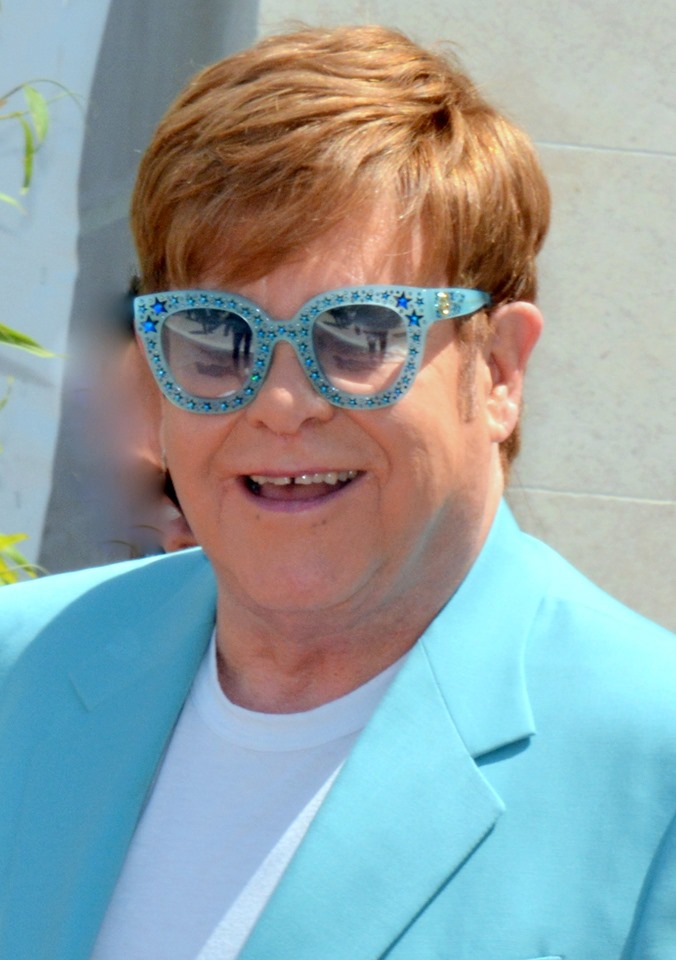
Elton John topped the UK Singles Chart three times this year with "Cold Heart (Pnau remix)" (a collaboration with Dua Lipa), "Merry Christmas", and "Sausage Rolls for Everyone" (both featuring Ed Sheeran and the latter featuring LadBaby), bringing his tally of UK number-one singles to ten. When "Cold Heart" topped the chart, John achieved his first number-one single in the UK chart since 2005.

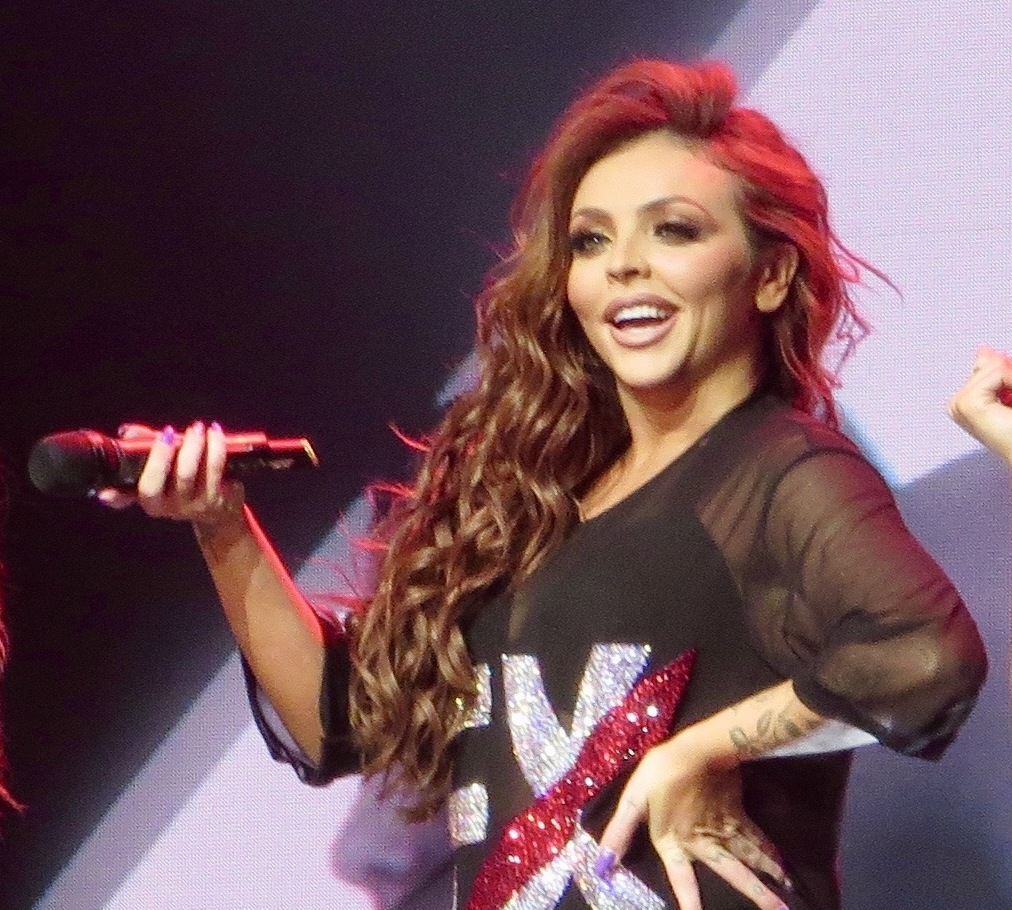
Former Little Mix member Jesy Nelson earned her first top 10 single independent of the group in October 2021 with "Boyz", featuring guest vocals from Nicki Minaj, which peaked at number four. Additionally, her vocals are featured on Little Mix's "Sweet Melody", which reached number-one in January.

The UK Singles Chart is one of many music charts compiled by the Official Charts Company that calculates the best-selling singles of the week in the United Kingdom. Since 2004 the chart has been based on the sales of both physical singles and digital downloads, with airplay figures excluded from the official chart. Since 2014, the singles chart has been based on both sales and streaming, with the ratio altered in 2017 to 150:1 streams and only three singles by the same artist eligible for the chart. From July 2018, video streams from YouTube Music and Spotify among others began to be counted for the Official Charts. This list shows singles that peaked in the Top 10 of the UK Singles Chart during 2021, as well as singles which peaked in 2020 and 2022 but were in the top 10 in 2021. The entry date is when the song appeared in the top 10 for the first time (week ending, as published by the Official Charts Company, which is six days after the chart is announced).

One-hundred and five singles were in the top 10 this year. Fourteen singles from 2020 remained in the top 10 for several weeks at the beginning of the year, while "Seventeen Going Under" by Sam Fender, "Coming for You" by SwitchOTR featuring A1 x J1, "Overseas" by D-Block Europe featuring Central Cee, "ABCDEFU" by Gayle, "Rockin' Around the Christmas Tree" by Brenda Lee and "Come On Home for Christmas" by George Ezra were all released in 2021 but did not reach their peak until 2022. "Sweet Melody" by Little Mix, "34+35" by Ariana Grande, "Step into Christmas" by Elton John, "This Christmas" by Jess Glynne, "Whoopty" by CJ and "Rockin' Around the Christmas Tree" by Justin Bieber were the singles from 2020 to reach their peak in 2021. The Kid Laroi, Mimi Webb, Olivia Rodrigo, Sam Fender and Tom Grennan were among the many artists who achieved their first top 10 single in 2021.

"Last Christmas" by Wham!, originally released in 1984, topped the chart for the first time in the first week of 2021. The first new number-one single of the year was "Sweet Melody" by Little Mix. Overall, thirteen different songs peaked at number-one in 2021, with Ed Sheeran (4) having the most songs hit that position.

== Background ==
=== Multiple entries ===
One hundred and five singles charted in the top 10 in 2021, with ninety-two singles reaching their peak this year (including the re-entry "Last Christmas").

=== "Last Christmas" finally reaches number-one ===
On New Year's Day 2021 (7 January 2021, week ending), Wham!'s iconic festive classic "Last Christmas", written by the group's lead singer George Michael, finally reached the coveted number-one spot in the UK chart. Upon its initial release in 1984, the single peaked at number two for five consecutive weeks. It returned to number two in 2017, one year after George Michael's death. The single finally reached the top spot more than 36 years after its initial release, the longest amount of time for a song to reach number-one, surpassing Tony Christie's almost 16 year-long record for the longest time a single has taken to top the UK Singles Chart after its initial release with "(Is This The Way To) Amarillo?" in March 2005, which had itself taken 33 years 4 months to top the chart (with Peter Kay, though credited, only actually appearing in the video). Prior to it reaching number one, "Last Christmas" had for many years held the record as the highest-selling single never to top the charts, with 1.9 million copies sold (not including streams).

=== Olivia Rodrigo becomes youngest solo artist to score UK chart double ===
On 28 May 2021 (3 June 2021, week ending), American singer Olivia Rodrigo became the youngest solo artist to achieve the coveted UK chart double at 18 years and 3 months old. Her single "Good 4 U" climbed to number-one in the UK Singles Chart after debuting at number two the previous week, while her debut album Sour entered the UK Albums Chart at number-one. Rodrigo became the first artist since Sam Smith in 2015 to garner a UK chart double with a debut album.

=== Little Mix set a new chart record ===
On 29 July 2021, British girl group Little Mix became the first girl group to spend 100 weeks inside the Top 10 of the Official UK Singles Chart. Heartbreak Anthem, the trio's collaboration with Swedish music duo Galantis, and French DJ David Guetta, placed at number 7, marking their 100th week in the Top 10 across all of their releases.

=== Måneskin become first Italian act with two simultaneous UK top-ten singles ===
On 25 June 2021 (1 July 2021, week ending), rock group Måneskin, winners of the Eurovision Song Contest 2021, became the first act from Italy to have two singles in the top-ten of the UK Singles Chart simultaneously with "I Wanna Be Your Slave" at number six and "Beggin'" (a cover of the 1967 song by Frankie Valli and the Four Seasons) at number ten.

=== ABBA score first top-ten single in forty years ===
On 10 September 2021 (16 September 2021, week ending), Swedish pop music legends ABBA returned to the top-ten of the UK Singles Chart for the first time in almost forty years when "Don't Shut Me Down" debuted at number nine, becoming their 20th top-ten single. The group's last single to reach the top-ten of the UK charts was "One of Us", which peaked at number three in December 1981.

=== Elton John's comeback year ===
2021 proved to be the comeback year for Elton John in the UK Singles Chart, with the British music icon earning the eighth, ninth and tenth number-one singles of his career in less than three months.

On 15 October 2021 (21 October 2021, week ending), he achieved his first UK number-one single in sixteen years when his collaboration with Dua Lipa, "Cold Heart (Pnau remix)", rose to the top of the UK Singles Chart during its fifth week in the top-ten.

On 10 December 2021 (16 December 2021, week ending), his festive collaboration with Ed Sheeran, "Merry Christmas", entered the chart at number-one. The song claimed 76,700 chart sales in its first week, including 22,100 pure sales (physical + digital downloads) and 7.6 million streams. It also earned the biggest week of CD single sales of 2021, with 8,100 copies sold on disc during its first week of release.

On 24 December 2021 (30 December 2021, week ending), after two weeks at number-one, "Merry Christmas" was denied the Christmas number-one single by Sheeran and John's collaboration with LadBaby, "Sausage Rolls for Everyone".

=== Adele scores first UK number-one single in six years and sets new chart record ===
On 22 October 2021 (28 October 2021, week ending), Adele returned to the UK Singles Chart after a five-year absence when her single "Easy on Me" entered the chart at number-one. The song amassed 217,300 chart sales in its first week, the highest first week figure since Ed Sheeran's "Shape Of You", which earned 226,800 in January 2017. Adele also set a new chart record with the single as "Easy On Me" racked up 24 million streams in the UK in its first week of release, the most streams for a song in one week – topping Ariana Grande's record of 16.9 million set back in January 2019 with "7 Rings". "Easy On Me" also earned the biggest week of digital download sales of 2021 so far, with 23,500.

=== LadBaby makes chart history with fourth consecutive Christmas number-one single ===
LadBaby made chart history this year when his song "Sausage Rolls for Everyone", a sausage roll-themed parody of Ed Sheeran and Elton John's number-one single "Merry Christmas", and also featuring Sheeran and John, debuted at number-one in the UK Singles Chart on 24 December 2021 (30 December 2021, week ending), giving the Nottingham-born YouTuber and musician his fourth consecutive Christmas number-one single. LadBaby became only the second act in history, after The Beatles, to secure four Christmas number-one singles, but was the very first to achieve four consecutive Christmas chart-toppers, surpassing the records of both The Beatles and The Spice Girls. "Sausage Rolls for Everyone" also became the 70th Christmas number-one single in the history of the UK Singles Chart since its introduction in 1952.

=== Chart debuts ===
Thirty-two artists achieved their first charting top 10 single in 2021, either as a lead or featured artist. Of these, five artists went on to record another hit single that year: A1 x J1, Ardee, The Kid Laroi, Måneskin and Polo G. Central Cee and Tom Grennan both scored two more chart hits this year. Olivia Rodrigo achieved three more chart hits in her breakthrough year.

The following table (collapsed on desktop site) does not include acts who had previously charted as part of a group and secured their first top 10 solo single.

Artist	Number of top 10s	First entry	Chart position	Other entries
Olivia Rodrigo	4	"Drivers License"	1	"Good 4 U" (1), "Deja Vu" (4), "Traitor" (5)
Tom Grennan	3	"Little Bit of Love"	7	"Let's Go Home Together" (10), "By Your Side" (9)
Central Cee	3	"Commitment Issues"	9	"Obsessed with You" (4), "Overseas" (6)
Polo G	2	"Patience"	3	"Rapstar" (3)
Måneskin	2	"I Wanna Be Your Slave"	5	"Beggin'" (7)
The Kid Laroi	2	"Without You"	2	"Stay" (2)
ArrDee	2	"Oliver Twist"	6	"Wasted" (6)
A1 x J1	2	"Latest Trends"	2	"Coming for You" (10)
Shane Codd	1	"Get Out My Head"	6	—
Nathan Evans	1	"Wellerman (Sea Shanty)"	1	—
Billen Ted	1	"Wellerman (Sea Shanty)"	1	—
HVME	1	"Goosebumps (Remix)"	8	—
6lack	1	"Calling My Phone"	2	—
Riton	1	"Friday"	4	—
Mufasa & Hypeman	1	"Friday"	4	—
Yungblud	1	"Patience"	3	—
Daniel Caesar	1	"Peaches"	2	—
Mimi Webb	1	"Good Without"	8	—
Jonasu	1	"Black Magic"	3	—
Jack Harlow	1	"Industry Baby"	3	—
Rain Radio	1	"Talk About"	9	—
DJ Craig Gorman	1	"Talk About"	9	—
Saweetie^{[1]}	1	"Out Out"	6	—
Glass Animals	1	"Heat Waves"	5	—
CKay	1	"Love Nwantiti (Ah Ah Ah)"	3	—
Joeboy	1	"Love Nwantiti (Ah Ah Ah)"	3	—
Kuami Eugene	1	"Love Nwantiti (Ah Ah Ah)"	3	—
Tyler Cole	1	"Meet Me at Our Spot"	10	—
Sam Fender	1	"Seventeen Going Under"	3	—
SwitchOTR	1	"Coming for You"	5	—
D-Block Europe	1	"Overseas"	6	—
Gayle	1	"ABCDEFU"	1	—

^{1} Whilst Saweetie is a featured artist on the single version of "Confetti", the Official Charts does not recognise her as a featured artist for this particular entry.

Notes

Jesy Nelson earned her first UK top ten debut in October 2021 with "Boyz". This also became her first top 10 since her departure from UK girl band Little Mix in December 2020. Willow Smith of The Anxiety had previously reached the top 10 as a solo artist in 2010 with "Whip My Hair".

=== Best-selling singles ===
Ed Sheeran had the best-selling single of the year with "Bad Habits". The song spent 22 weeks in the top 10 (including eleven weeks at number-one), sold over 1,700,000 copies and was certified 2× platinum by the BPI. "Good 4 U" by Olivia Rodrigo came in second place, while Olivia Rodrigo's "Drivers License", "Save Your Tears" by The Weeknd and "Montero (Call Me By Your Name)" by Lil Nas X made up the top five. Songs by Dua Lipa, The Kid Laroi and Justin Bieber, Glass Animals, The Weeknd ("Blinding Lights") and Russ Millions and Tion Wayne were also in the top ten best-selling singles of the year.

== Top-ten singles ==
Key

Symbol	Meaning
‡	Single peaked in 2020 but still in chart in 2021.
♦	Single released in 2021 but peaked in 2022.
(#)	Year-end top-ten single position and rank
Entered	The date that the single first appeared in the chart.
Peak	Highest position that the single reached in the UK Singles Chart.

Entered (week ending)	Weeks in top 10	Single	Artist	Peak	Peak reached (week ending)	Weeks at peak
Singles in 2020
8 October 2020	12	"You Broke Me First" ‡ ^{[O]}	Tate McRae	3	29 October 2020	1
5 November 2020	13	"Sweet Melody" ^{[A]}	Little Mix	1	14 January 2021	1
12 November 2020	6	"34+35" ^{[B]}^{[N]}^{[R]}	Ariana Grande	3	28 January 2021	1
19 November 2020	6	"Levitating" ‡ (#6) ^{[M]}	Dua Lipa	5	3 December 2020	2
10 December 2020	10	"All I Want for Christmas Is You" ‡ ^{[C]}^{[PP]}	Mariah Carey	1	17 December 2020	2
10 December 2020	10	"Last Christmas" ^{[D]}^{[QQ]}	Wham!	1	7 January 2021	1
10 December 2020	9	"Fairytale of New York" ‡ ^{[E]}^{[SS]}	The Pogues featuring Kirsty MacColl	4	17 December 2020	2
17 December 2020	8	"Merry Christmas Everyone" ‡ ^{[F]}^{[RR]}	Shakin' Stevens	6	17 December 2020	6
17 December 2020	4	"Do They Know It's Christmas?" ‡ ^{[G]}^{[H]}	Band Aid	7	24 December 2020	1
17 December 2020	5	"It's Beginning to Look a Lot Like Christmas" ‡ ^{[I]}^{[TT]}^{[WW]}	Michael Bublé	7	17 December 2020	2
17 December 2020	3	"Step into Christmas" ^{[J]}	Elton John	8	7 January 2021	1
24 December 2020	3	"This Christmas" ^{[K]}	Jess Glynne	3	7 January 2021	1
24 December 2020	5	"Whoopty" ^{[L]}	CJ	3	14 January 2021	1
31 December 2020	2	"Rockin' Around the Christmas Tree"	Justin Bieber	4	7 January 2021	1
Singles in 2021
14 January 2021	5	"Afterglow"	Ed Sheeran	2	14 January 2021	1
14 January 2021	6	"Anyone"	Justin Bieber	4	14 January 2021	1
14 January 2021	8	"Get Out My Head" ^{[S]}	Shane Codd	6	14 January 2021	1
14 January 2021	10	"Without You"	The Kid Laroi	2	4 February 2021	1
14 January 2021	9	"Paradise"	Meduza featuring Dermot Kennedy	5	4 February 2021	1
21 January 2021	10	"Drivers License" (#3) ^{[Z]}	Olivia Rodrigo	1	21 January 2021	9
28 January 2021	12	"Don't Play"	Anne-Marie, KSI & Digital Farm Animals	2	28 January 2021	1
4 February 2021	14	"Wellerman"	Nathan Evans, 220 Kid & Billen Ted	1	25 March 2021	2
11 February 2021	1	"Money Talks"	Fredo featuring Dave	3	11 February 2021	1
18 February 2021	1	"Bringing It Back"	Digga D & AJ Tracey	5	18 February 2021	1
18 February 2021	12	"The Business"	Tiësto	3	18 March 2021	1
18 February 2021	5	"Goosebumps (Remix)" ^{[U]}	Travis Scott & HVME	8	11 March 2021	1
25 February 2021	6	"Calling My Phone"	Lil Tjay & 6lack	2	25 February 2021	2
25 February 2021	14	"Friday"	Riton & Nightcrawlers featuring Mufasa & Hypeman	4	1 April 2021	1
18 March 2021	1	"What's Next"	Drake	4	18 March 2021	1
18 March 2021	1	"Lemon Pepper Freestyle"	Drake featuring Rick Ross	6	18 March 2021	1
18 March 2021	1	"Wants and Needs"	Drake featuring Lil Baby	10	18 March 2021	1
25 March 2021	4	"Latest Trends" ^{[T]}	A1 x J1	2	25 March 2021	2
25 March 2021	2	"Patience"	KSI featuring Yungblud & Polo G	3	25 March 2021	1
25 March 2021	10	"Bed"	Joel Corry, Raye & David Guetta	3	29 April 2021	2
25 March 2021	1	"Commitment Issues"	Central Cee	9	25 March 2021	1
1 April 2021	9	"Peaches"	Justin Bieber featuring Daniel Caesar & Givēon	2	15 April 2021	4
1 April 2021	1	"Hold On"	Justin Bieber	10	1 April 2021	1
8 April 2021	9	"Montero (Call Me by Your Name)" (#5)	Lil Nas X	1	8 April 2021	5
8 April 2021	2	"Your Love (9PM)"	ATB x Topic x A7S	8	8 April 2021	2
8 April 2021	8	"Little Bit of Love"	Tom Grennan	7	29 April 2021	1
22 April 2021	5	"Rapstar"	Polo G	3	22 April 2021	1
22 April 2021	1	"Titanium"	Dave	9	22 April 2021	1
22 April 2021	11	"Kiss Me More"	Doja Cat featuring SZA	3	13 May 2021	6
29 April 2021	1	"Let's Go Home Together"	Ella Henderson & Tom Grennan	10	29 April 2021	1
6 May 2021	7	"Body" (#10) ^{[X]}	Russ Millions & Tion Wayne	1	13 May 2021	3
13 May 2021	1	"Your Power"	Billie Eilish	5	13 May 2021	1
13 May 2021	14	"Save Your Tears" (#4) ^{[Y]}^{[DD]}	The Weeknd	2	17 June 2021	2
20 May 2021	2	"Anywhere Away from Here"	Rag'n'Bone Man & Pink	9	20 May 2021	2
27 May 2021	9	"Good 4 U" (#2)	Olivia Rodrigo	1	3 June 2021	5
3 June 2021	2	"Butter"	BTS	3	3 June 2021	1
3 June 2021	4	"Deja Vu"	Olivia Rodrigo	4	3 June 2021	2
3 June 2021	5	"Traitor" ^{[AA]}^{[CC]}	Olivia Rodrigo	5	17 June 2021	1
3 June 2021	12	"Heartbreak Anthem"	Galantis, David Guetta & Little Mix	3	15 July 2021	2
3 June 2021	5	"Good Without"	Mimi Webb	8	1 July 2021	1
10 June 2021	3	"Confetti"	Little Mix	9	10 June 2021	1
17 June 2021	4	"Oliver Twist"	ArrDee	6	24 June 2021	1
24 June 2021	9	"I Wanna Be Your Slave"	Måneskin	5	8 July 2021	3
1 July 2021	6	"Holiday" ^{[EE]}	KSI	2	1 July 2021	1
1 July 2021	8	"Beggin'"	Måneskin	6	29 July 2021	1
8 July 2021	22	"Bad Habits" (#1)	Ed Sheeran	1	8 July 2021	11
8 July 2021	1	"You Right"	Doja Cat & The Weeknd	9	8 July 2021	1
8 July 2021	2	"By Your Side"	Calvin Harris & Tom Grennan	9	15 July 2021	1
15 July 2021	2	"Three Lions" ^{[BB]}	Baddiel, Skinner & The Lightning Seeds	4	15 July 2021	2
22 July 2021	6	"Clash"	Dave featuring Stormzy	2	5 August 2021	1
22 July 2021	10	"Stay" (#7)	The Kid Laroi & Justin Bieber	2	29 July 2021	6
29 July 2021	7	"Black Magic"	Jonasu	3	12 August 2021	2
29 July 2021	8	"Remember"	Becky Hill & David Guetta	3	26 August 2021	3
5 August 2021	1	"Verdansk"	Dave	4	5 August 2021	1
5 August 2021	1	"In the Fire"	Dave	6	5 August 2021	1
12 August 2021	7	"Happier Than Ever" ^{[II]}	Billie Eilish	4	19 August 2021	1
26 August 2021	2	"Wasted"	Digga D & ArrDee	6	26 August 2021	1
26 August 2021	9	"Industry Baby"	Lil Nas X & Jack Harlow	3	30 September 2021	1
26 August 2021	3	"Talk About"	Rain Radio & DJ Craig Gorman	9	26 August 2021	3
2 September 2021	1	"Visiting Hours"	Ed Sheeran	5	2 September 2021	1
2 September 2021	11	"Out Out"	Joel Corry & Jax Jones featuring Charli XCX & Saweetie	6	9 September 2021	1
9 September 2021	1	"Hurricane"	Kanye West	7	9 September 2021	1
9 September 2021	1	"Kiss My (Uh-Oh)" ^{[FF]}	Anne-Marie & Little Mix	10	9 September 2021	1
16 September 2021	5	"Girls Want Girls"	Drake featuring Lil Baby	2	16 September 2021	2
16 September 2021	2	"Fair Trade"	Drake featuring Travis Scott	3	16 September 2021	1
16 September 2021	1	"Champagne Poetry"	Drake	5	16 September 2021	1
16 September 2021	1	"Don't Shut Me Down"	ABBA	9	16 September 2021	1
16 September 2021	10	"Heat Waves" (#8)	Glass Animals	5	14 October 2021	3
23 September 2021	12	"Shivers" ^{[DDD]}	Ed Sheeran	1	23 September 2021	4
23 September 2021	10	"Cold Heart (Pnau remix)"	Elton John & Dua Lipa	1	21 October 2021	1
23 September 2021	9	"Obsessed with You"	Central Cee	4	30 September 2021	2
30 September 2021	9	"Love Nwantiti (Ah Ah Ah)"	CKay featuring Joeboy & Kuami Eugene	3	14 October 2021	2
30 September 2021	3	"Thats What I Want" ^{[LL]}	Lil Nas X	10	30 September 2021	3
7 October 2021	3	"My Universe" ^{[KK]}	Coldplay & BTS	3	7 October 2021	1
21 October 2021	1	"Boyz"	Jesy Nelson featuring Nicki Minaj	4	21 October 2021	1
28 October 2021	13	"Easy on Me" ^{[XX]}	Adele	1	28 October 2021	8
11 November 2021	5	"Overpass Graffiti"	Ed Sheeran	4	11 November 2021	1
11 November 2021	2	"Meet Me at Our Spot"	The Anxiety ^{[MM]}	10	11 November 2021	2
18 November 2021	7	"Flowers (Say My Name)" ^{[BBB]}^{[EEE]}	ArrDee	5	18 November 2021	2
25 November 2021	3	"All Too Well (Taylor's Version)"	Taylor Swift	3	25 November 2021	1
25 November 2021	14	"Seventeen Going Under" ♦ ^{[VV]}^{[ZZ]}	Sam Fender	3	13 January 2022	1
25 November 2021	4	"Coming for You" ♦ ^{[AAA]}	SwitchOTR featuring A1 x J1	5	13 January 2022	1
2 December 2021	2	"Oh My God"	Adele	2	2 December 2021	1
2 December 2021	2	"I Drink Wine"	Adele	4	2 December 2021	1
2 December 2021	12	"Overseas" ♦ ^{[CCC]}	D-Block Europe featuring Central Cee	6	10 February 2022	1
9 December 2021	10	"ABCDEFU" ♦ ^{[YY]}	Gayle	1	20 January 2022	1
16 December 2021	4	"Merry Christmas"	Ed Sheeran & Elton John	1	16 December 2021	3
16 December 2021	4	"Rockin' Around the Christmas Tree" ♦ ^{[UU]}	Brenda Lee	5	6 January 2022	1
30 December 2021	1	"Sausage Rolls for Everyone"	LadBaby featuring Ed Sheeran & Elton John	1	30 December 2021	1
30 December 2021	1	"Boris Johnson Is Still a Fucking Cunt"	The Kunts	5	30 December 2021	1
30 December 2021	2	"Come On Home for Christmas" ♦	George Ezra	8	6 January 2022	1

== Entries by artist ==
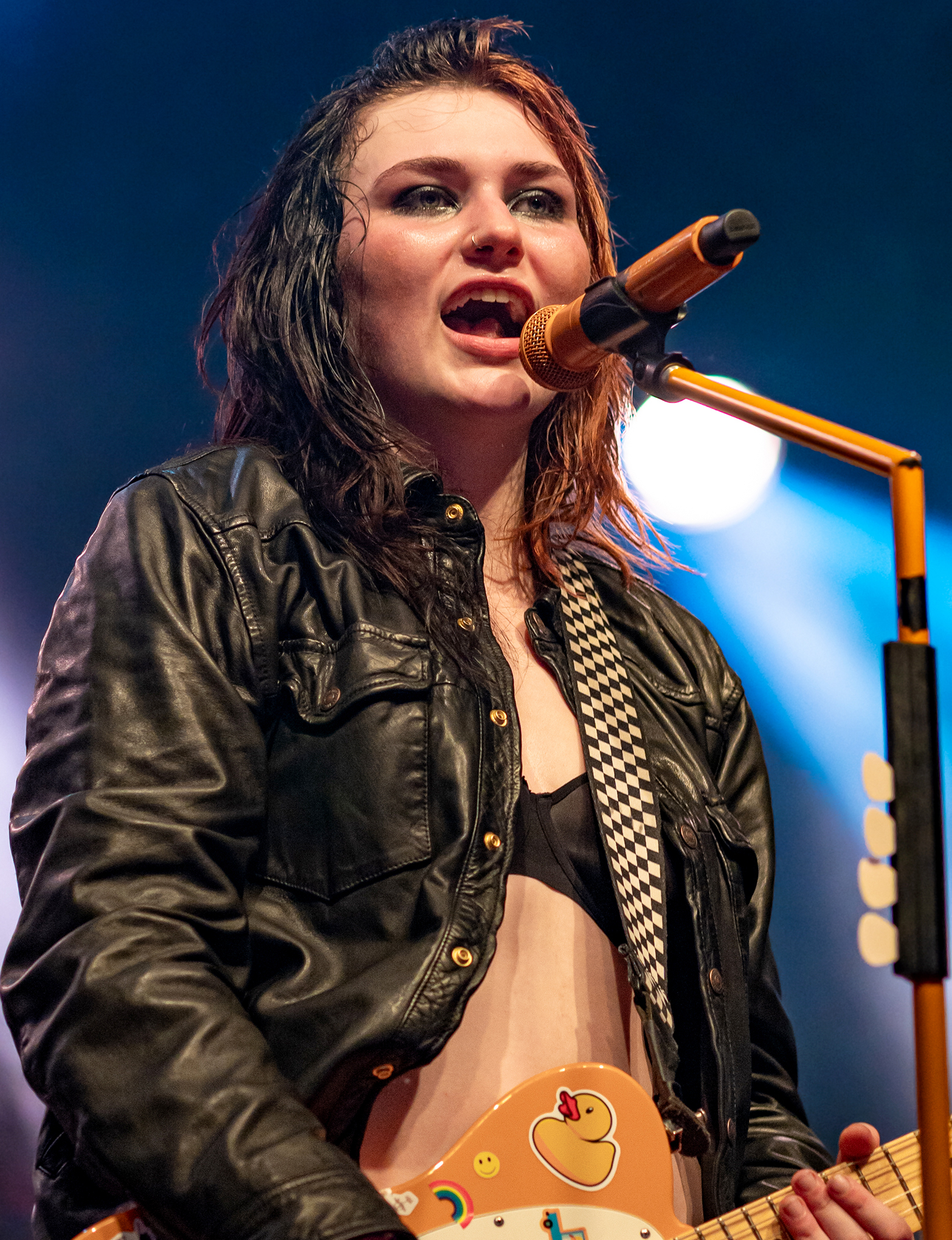
Gayle became a one-hit wonder in the UK charts in 2021 with her single "ABCDEFU", which rose to number-one in January 2022.

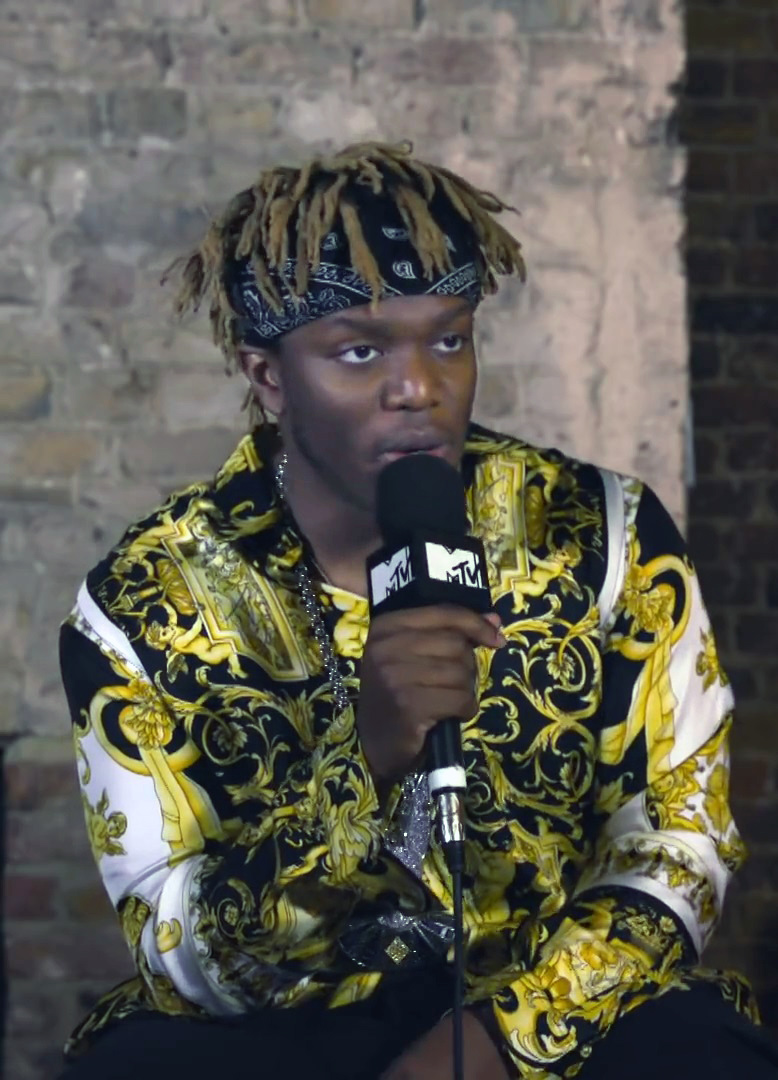
KSI reached the UK top 10 three times this year with the singles "Don't Play", "Patience" and "Holiday", which all peaked within the top three.

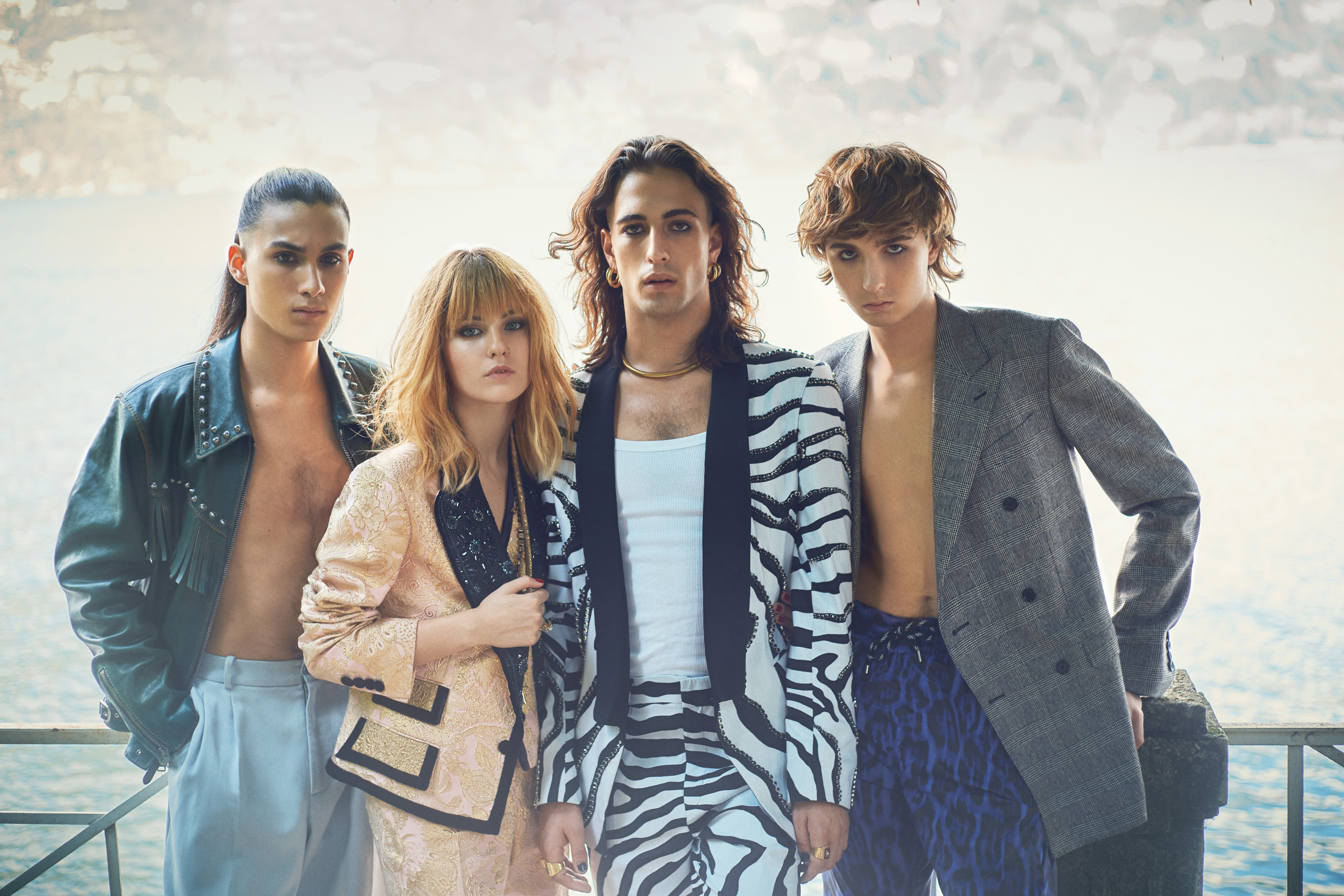
Italian rock group Måneskin gained success following their win in the Eurovision Song Contest 2021, securing two UK top 10 entries: "I Wanna Be Your Slave" and "Beggin'". They also became the first act from Italy to have two singles in the top-ten of the UK Singles Chart simultaneously.

The following table shows artists who have achieved two or more top 10 entries in 2021, including singles that reached their peak in 2020. The figures include both main artists and featured artists, while appearances on ensemble charity records are also counted for each artist. The total number of weeks an artist spent in the top ten in 2021 is also shown.

Entries	Artist	Weeks	Singles
7	Ed Sheeran	31	"Afterglow", "Bad Habits", "Visiting Hours", "Shivers", "Overpass Graffiti", "Merry Christmas"*, "Sausage Rolls for Everyone"*
6	Drake	6	"What's Next", "Lemon Pepper Freestyle", "Wants and Needs", "Girls Want Girls", "Fair Trade", "Champagne Poetry"
5	Justin Bieber	26	"Rockin' Around the Christmas Tree", "Anyone", "Peaches", "Hold On", "Stay"
5	Dave ^{[V]}	8	"Money Talks", "Titanium", "Clash", "Verdansk", "In the Fire"
4	Elton John	14	"Step Into Christmas", "Cold Heart (Pnau remix)", "Merry Christmas"*, "Sausage Rolls for Everyone"*
4	Little Mix	19	"Sweet Melody", "Heartbreak Anthem", "Confetti", "Kiss My (Uh-Oh)"
4	Olivia Rodrigo	18	"Drivers License", "Good 4 U", "Deja Vu", "Traitor"
3	David Guetta	26	"Bed", "Heartbreak Anthem", "Remember"
3	Adele	9	"Easy on Me", "Oh My God", "I Drink Wine"
3	KSI	20	"Don't Play", "Patience", "Holiday"
3	Tom Grennan	10	"Little Bit of Love", "Let's Go Home Together", "By Your Side"
3	ArrDee	10	"Oliver Twist", "Wasted", "Flowers (Say My Name)"
3	Central Cee ^{[OO]}	11	"Commitment Issues", "Obsessed with You", "Overseas"
3	Lil Nas X	20	"Montero (Call Me By Your Name)", "Industry Baby", "Thats What I Want"
2	Anne-Marie	13	"Don't Play", "Kiss My (Uh-Oh)"
2	Joel Corry	21	"Bed", "Out Out"
2	Jesy Nelson ^{[JJ]}	7	"Sweet Melody", "Boyz"
2	Dua Lipa	12	"Levitating", "Cold Heart (Pnau remix)"
2	Digga D	3	"Bringing It Back", "Wasted"
2	George Michael ^{[P]}^{[Q]}	5	"Last Christmas"*, "Do They Know It's Christmas?"
2	A1 x J1^{[NN]}	5	"Latest Trends", "Coming for You"
2	Doja Cat	12	"Kiss Me More", "You Right"
2	Billie Eilish	9	"Your Power", "Happier Than Ever"
2	Polo G	7	"Patience", "Rapstar"
2	Travis Scott	7	"Goosebumps (Remix)", "Fair Trade"
2	Lil Baby ^{[GG]}^{[HH]}	6	"Wants and Needs", "Girls Want Girls"
2	The Kid Laroi	20	"Without You", "Stay"
2	The Weeknd	14	"Save Your Tears", "You Right"
2	Måneskin	9	"I Wanna Be Your Slave", "Beggin'"
2	BTS	5	"Butter", "My Universe"

== Notes ==
- ^{a} "Sweet Melody" re-entered the top 10 at number 9 on 7 January 2021 (week ending).
- ^{b} "34+35" re-entered the top 10 at number 10 on 10 December 2020 (week ending).
- ^{c} "All I Want fot Christmas Is You" re-entered the top 10 at number 2 on 10 December 2020 (week ending), and peaked at number-one for the first time ever on 17 December 2020 (week ending).
- ^{d} "Last Christmas" re-entered the top 10 at number 3 on 10 December 2020 (week ending). Having originally peaked at number 2 in 1984, the song reached number-one for the first time ever on 7 January 2021 (week ending).
- ^{e} "Fairytale of New York" re-entered the top 10 at number 8 on 10 December 2020 (week ending), having originally peaked at number 2 upon release in 1987.
- ^{f} "Merry Christmas Everyone" re-entered the top 10 at number 6 on 17 December 2020 (week ending), having originally peaked at number 1 upon release in 1985.
- ^{g} Released as a charity single by Band Aid in 1984 to aid famine relief in Ethiopia.
- ^{h} "Do They Know It's Christmas?" re-entered the top 10 at number 8 on 17 December 2020 (week ending), having originally peaked at number 1 upon release in 1984.
- ^{i} "It's Beginning to Look A lot Like Christmas" re-entered the top 10 at number 10 on 7 January 2021 (week ending).
- ^{j} "Step Into Christmas" re-entered the top 10 at number 10 on 17 December 2020 (week ending).
- ^{k} "This Christmas" entered the top 10 at number 9 on 24 December 2020 (week ending).
- ^{l} "Whoopty" re-entered the top 10 at number 3 on 14 January 2021 (week ending).
- ^{m} "Levitating" re-entered the top 10 at number 5 on 14 January 2021 (week ending).
- ^{n} "34+35" re-entered the top 10 at number 8 on 14 January 2021 (week ending).
- ^{o} "You Broke Me First" re-entered the top 10 at number 9 on 14 January 2021 (week ending).
- ^{p} Figure includes a top-ten hit as a member of the group Wham!
- ^{q} Figure includes an appearance on the "Do They Know It's Christmas?" charity single by Band Aid.
- ^{r} "34+35" re-entered the top 10 at number 3 on 28 January 2021 (week ending), following the subsequent remix featuring Doja Cat and Megan Thee Stallion.
- ^{s} "Get Out My Head" re-entered the top 10 at number 8 on 11 February 2021 (week ending).
- ^{t} "Latest Trends" entered the top 10 at number 2 on 25 March (week ending), following the subsequent remix featuring Aitch.
- ^{u} "Goosebumps (Remix)" re-entered the top 10 at number 10 on 25 March 2021 (week ending).
- ^{v} Figure includes a feature on "Money Talks".
- ^{w} Figure includes a feature on "Patience".
- ^{x} "Body" entered the top 10 at number 4 on 6 May 2021 (week ending), following the subsequent remix featuring Bugzy Malone, Fivio Foreign, Darkoo, Buni, ArrDee, E1 and ZT.
- ^{y} "Save Your Tears" entered the top 10 at number 8 on 13 May 2021 (week ending), following the subsequent remix featuring Ariana Grande.
- ^{z} "Drivers License" re-entered the top 10 at number 6 on 10 June 2021 (week ending).
- ^{aa} "Traitor" re-entered the top 10 at number 5 on 17 June 2021 (week ending).
- ^{bb} "Three Lions" originally peaked at number-one upon its initial release in 1996. It had further spells in the top 10 in 2006 and 2010, and another spell at number-one in 2018. It re-entered the top 10 at number 4 on 15 July 2021 (week ending), following England's success in the UEFA Euro 2020.
- ^{cc} "Traitor" re-entered the top 10 at number 10 on 15 July 2021 (week ending).
- ^{dd} "Save Your Tears" re-entered the top 10 at number 10 on 12 August 2021 (week ending).
- ^{ee} "Holiday" re-entered the top 10 at number 10 on 26 August 2021 (week ending).
- ^{ff} "Kiss My (Uh-Oh)" entered the top 10 at number 10 on 9 September 2021 (week ending), following the subsequent Girl Power remix featuring Raye, Becky Hill and Stefflon Don.
- ^{gg} Figure includes a feature on "Wants and Needs".
- ^{hh} Figure includes a feature on "Girls Want Girls".
- ^{ii} "Happier Than Ever" re-entered the top 10 at number 9 on 14 October 2021 (week ending).
- ^{jj} Figure includes a feature on top-ten hit "Sweet Melody" as a then member of Little Mix.
- ^{kk} "My Universe" re-entered the top 10 at number 5 on 28 October 2021 (week ending) following the release of the album Music of the Spheres.
- ^{ll} "That's What I Want" re-entered the top 10 at number 10 on 28 October 2021 (week ending).
- ^{mm} The Anxiety were a duo consisting of singers Willow Smith and Tyler Cole.
- ^{nn} Figure includes a feature on "Coming for You".
- ^{oo} Figure includes a feature on "Overseas".
- ^{pp} "All I Want fot Christmas Is You" re-entered the top 10 at number 3 on 9 December 2021 (week ending).
- ^{qq} "Last Christmas" re-entered the top 10 at number 4 on 9 December 2021 (week ending).
- ^{rr} "Merry Christmas Everyone" re-entered the top 10 at number 6 on 16 December 2021 (week ending).
- ^{ss} "Fairytale of New York" re-entered the top 10 at number 7 on 16 December 2021 (week ending).
- ^{tt} "It's Beginning to Look A lot Like Christmas" re-entered the top 10 at number 9 on 16 December 2021 (week ending).
- ^{uu} "Rockin' Around the Christmas Tree" re-entered the top 10 at number 10 on 16 December 2021 (week ending), having originally peaked at number 6 upon release in 1962. It reached a new peak of number 5 on 6 January 2022 (week ending).
- ^{vv} "Seventeen Going Under" re-entered the top 10 at number 9 on 23 December 2021 (week ending).
- ^{ww} "It's Beginning to Look A lot Like Christmas" re-entered the top 10 at number 7 on 6 January 2022 (week ending).
- ^{xx} "Easy on Me" re-entered the top 10 at number-one on 13 January 2022 (week ending).
- ^{yy} "ABCDEFU" re-entered the top 10 at number 2 on 13 January 2022 (week ending).
- ^{zz} "Seventeen Going Under" re-entered the top 10 at number 3 on 13 January 2022 (week ending).
- ^{aaa} "Coming for You" re-entered the top 10 at number 5 on 13 January 2022 (week ending).
- ^{bbb} "Flowers (Say My Name)" re-entered the top 10 at number 7 on 13 January 2022 (week ending).
- ^{ccc} "Overseas" re-entered the top 10 at number 8 on 13 January 2022 (week ending).
- ^{ddd} "Shivers" re-entered the top 10 at number 10 on 13 January 2022 (week ending).
- ^{eee} "Flowers (Say My Name)" re-entered the top 10 at number 10 on 27 January 2022 (week ending).
