= Dan Bryer =

English musical artist (born 1989)

Daniel Bryer
- Born: 11 September 1989 (age 37); Surrey, United Kingdom
- Genres: Pop, RnB, Folk, Acoustic, Alternative, Indie, Rock
- Label: Catherine Songs

Daniel Bryer (born 1989) is an English songwriter, producer and multi-instrumentalist.

He has written and produced songs for artists such as One Direction, Rag'n'Bone Man, Tom Grennan, Alan Walker, Niall Horan, Liam Payne, Sea Girls, Sophie and the Giants, Sam Feldt, JP Cooper, Westlife, & James TW.

Notable songs written by Bryer include "Little Bit of Love" by Tom Grennan, "This Town" by Niall Horan, "Skin" by Rag'n'Bone Man, and "Tired" by Alan Walker. Bryer's production credits include "Home" & "What a Feeling" by One Direction, "Starlight" by Westlife and "Put A Little Love On Me" by Niall Horan.

Bryer has contributed to eight Number 1 Albums and three Top10 Singles.

Bryer's composition "Little Bit of Love" by Tom Grennan received a nomination for Song Of The Year at the Brit Awards.

Bryer's songwriting & production debut "What a Feeling" from One Direction’s album 'Made in the A.M.' topped Rolling Stone's 'Readers' Poll' as the best track One Direction ever released.

== Discography ==
Credits according to Tidal.

Year	Artist	Album	Song	Songwriter	Producer
2026	Sophie and the Giants	Stripped	Lonely Hearts	check	
2026	Forest Blakk	As You Are	Butterflies	check	check
2026	Tom Cooper		Dark Circles	check	
2026	Dolder		Sleeping Dogs	check	
2026	Ellur	At Home In My Mind	At Home In My Mind	check	
2026	Nathan Evans & Saint Phnx	Angels' Share	All Roads	check	
2026	Nathan Evans & Saint Phnx	Angels' Share	Angels' Share	check	
2025	Wes Nelson		11:11	check	
2025	Ben Ellis		Still Be Friends	check	
2025	Matteo Bocelli		Lost This Christmas	check	
2025	Rea Garvey	Before I Met Supergirl	Irish Eyes	check	check
2025	Rea Garvey	Before I Met Supergirl	Kids In Love	check	check
2025	Michael Patrick Kelly	Traces	Wildflower	check	check
2025	Michael Patrick Kelly	Traces	K.H.A.	check	
2025	Michael Patrick Kelly	Traces	Traces	check	
2025	Michael Patrick Kelly	Traces	Run Free	check	
2025	Rea Garvey	Before I Met Supergirl	Take This Heart	check	check
2025	Leoni		Pretty Girls	check	check
2024	Rea Garvey		Halo	check	check
2024	Sea Girls	Midnight Butterflies	Horror Movies	check	check
2024	Sea Girls	Midnight Butterflies	Does Only God Know That We're Lonely	check	check
2024	Sea Girls	Midnight Butterflies	Polly	check	check
2024	Liam Payne		Teardrops	check	check
2024	Ellur		Satellites	check	
2024	Sea Girls	Midnight Butterflies	I Want You To Know Me	check	check
2023	Tom Grennan	What Ifs & Maybes	This Side Of The Room	check	
2023	Tom Grennan	What Ifs & Maybes	Someone I Used To Know	check	check
2023	Tom Grennan	What Ifs & Maybes	Unbreak A Broken	check	check
2023	Niall Horan	The Show	The Show	check	
2023	Niall Horan	The Show	Science	check	
2023	Nico Santos	Ride	Real Love	check	
2022	Sam Ryder	There's Nothing but Space, Man!	Crashing Down	check	
2022	Sam Feldt, Gavin James		Better	check	
2022	Sea Girls		Falling Apart	check	
2022	Gavin James		Kingdom	check	
2022	JP Cooper	She	Kids	check	
2022	JP Cooper	She	She	check	check
2022	JP Cooper	She	Need You Tonight	check	check
2021	Michael Patrick Kelly	BOATS	Blurry Eyes	check	
2021	BEKA		Thorn	check	check
2021	Kawala		Searching	check	check
2021	Westlife	Wild Dreams	Starlight	check	
2021	Into The Ark		The Show	check	check
2021	Sophie and the Giants		Don't Ask Me To Change	check	check
2021	Declan Donavan		Into The Fire	check	check
2021	Bow Anderson		Hate That I Fell In Love With You	check	
2021	Etham		Somebody Else To Love	check	check
2021	Into The Ark		Olivia	check	check
2021	Rebecca Ferguson & Nile Rodgers		No Words Needed	check	
2021	Bow Anderson	New Wave EP	New Wave	check	
2021	Tom Grennan	Evering Road	Little Bit of Love	check	check
2020	Duncan Laurence	Small Town Boy	Loves You Like I Couldn't Do	check	
2020	Bow Anderson		Island	check	
2020	Bobby Bazini	Move Away	Love & Alcohol	check	check
2020	Bow Anderson		Heavy	check	
2020	Gavin James		Boxes	check	
2020	Niall Horan	Heartbreak Weather	Small Talk	check	check
2020	Niall Horan	Heartbreak Weather	Arms Of A Stranger	check	
2020	Niall Horan	Heartbreak Weather	Still	check	check
2020	Robinson	Watching You EP	Watching You	check	
2020	JP Cooper		In These Arms	check	
2019	Niall Horan		Put a Little Love on Me	check	check
2019	New Rules	New Rules EP	24 Hours	check	check
2019	New Rules	New Rules EP	Night Like This	check	check
2019	Jack Valier		Copenhagen	check	
2019	Michael Schulte	Highs & Lows	Someone	check	check
2019	Danny Jones	$igns	$igns	check	
2019	Danny Jones	$igns	Talk In The Morning	check	
2019	Into the Ark		'Put Us Back Together'		check
2019	James TW	Chapters	'Incredible'	check	
2019	Milow	Break The Silence	'She'	check	check
2019	Milow	Break The Silence	'Break The Silence'	check	check
2019	Milow	Break The Silence	'Help'	check	check
2019	Mabes		'Free'	check	check
2019	Mabes		'Gone'		
2018	Gavin James	Only Ticket Home	'Tired'	check	check
2018	Gavin James	Only Ticket Home	'Faces'	check	
2018	Liv Dawson	Bedroom EP	'Good Intentions'	check	check
2018	Leo Stannard	Maratea	'5 Years Later'	check	
2018	Emma Jensen		'Rush'	check	
2018	Royal Wood	Ever After The Farewell	'Made of Gold'	check	
2018	Royal Wood	Ever After The Farewell	'King & Queen'	check	
2018	Royal Wood	Ever After The Farewell	'Midnight Hour'	check	
2018	Royal Wood	Ever After The Farewell	'Nowhere to be Found'	check	
2018	Royal Wood	Ever After The Farewell	'Old Young Love'	check	
2018	Liv Dawson		'Talk'	check	check
2017	Michael Patrick Kelly	iD	'Roundabouts'	check	check
2017	Niall Horan	Flicker	'Mirrors'	check	
2017	Hurts	Desire	'Hold On To Me'		check
2017	Alan Walker		'Tired'	check	
2017	Rag'n'Bone Man	Human	'Skin'	check	
2017	Coasts	This Life	'Heart Starts Beating'		check
2017	Coasts	This Life	'Let Me Love You'	check	check
2017	Coasts	This Life	'Born To Die'	check	check
2017	Coasts	This Life	'Paradise'		check
2017	Coasts	This Life	'Take Me Back Home'		check
2017	Coasts	This Life	'Come On Over'		check
2017	Coasts	This Life	'White Noise'	check	check
2016	Niall Horan	Flicker	'This Town'	check	
2016	The Beach		'Geronimo'	check	check
2016	Jessie Ware	Me Before You Soundtrack	'Till The End'		check
2015	One Direction	Made in the A.M.	'What A Feeling'	check	check
2015	One Direction	Made in the A.M.	'Home'		check

== Awards and nominations ==
Ivor Novello Award

Year	Nominee / work	Award	Result
2022	Little Bit Of Love	PRS For Music Award	Nominated
