= Mike Needle =

English musician (born 1986)

- Born: 4 June 1986 (age 40); Rowtown/Ottershaw, Surrey, United Kingdom
- Genres: Pop, RnB, Folk, Acoustic, Alternative, Indie, Rock
- Label: Catherine Songs

Mike Needle (born 4 June 1986) is an English songwriter, producer and singer.

He has co-written songs for artists such as One Direction, Rita Ora, Tom Grennan, Niall Horan, Rag'n'Bone Man, Alan Walker, James TW & JP Cooper, and has vocal-produced for artists such as Ella Henderson, One Direction, Christina Perri & Westlife.

Notable songs written by Needle include "This Town" by Niall Horan, "Skin" by Rag'n'Bone Man, "Tired" by Alan Walker, and "Little Bit of Love" by Tom Grennan.

Needle's composition "Little Bit of Love" by Tom Grennan received a nomination for Song Of The Year at the 2022 Brit Awards.

Needle's songwriting debut 'What a Feeling" from One Direction's album 'Made in the A.M.' topped Rolling Stone's Readers' Poll as the best track One Direction ever released.

Needle has contributed to eleven Top10 Albums in the US & UK, and three Top10 Singles. Human by Rag'n'Bone Man, Evering Road by Tom Grennan, and Flicker by Niall Horan all achieved No.1 in the US/UK.

In 2022, Needle was nominated for an Ivor Novello Award for his composition "Little Bit of Love".

== Songwriting Discography ==
As per Tidal Credits

Year	Artist	Album	Song	Songwriter	Producer	Vocal Prod
2026	Tom Grennan		Wrapped In Gold	✓	✓	
2026	Take That ft Michael Patrick Kelly		Feel My Love	✓		
2026	Pedro Santos		Should Have Known Better	✓	✓	
2026	Moss Kena		Worshipping The Sun	✓		
2026	Paula Stellar		Girl My Age	✓		
2026	Loi & David Puentez		Golden Summer	✓		
2026	Take That		Sweet July	✓		
2026	Jack Dean		Mercy	✓		
2026	Tom Gregory		How It Was Before	✓		
2026	ADMT	From Good to Bad and Then Back Again	The Door That Never Opens	✓		
2026	ADMT	From Good to Bad and Then Back Again	Wish You Good	✓		
2026	Moss Kena		Rhythm Unknown	✓		
2026	Paula Stellar		LOVESICK	✓	✓	
2026	Only the Poets		Bad	✓		
2026	Pedro Santos		I Don't Know Me	✓	✓	
2025	Loi		Red Eyes	✓		
2025	Wes Nelson		11:11	✓		
2025	Matteo Bocelli		Lost This Christmas	✓		
2025	Calum Scott	Avenoir	Lost Myself	✓		
2025	ISAAK		PAPER PLANE	✓	✓	
2025	Jack Dean		Tears Won't Save You	✓		
2025	Chanin		Whisper	✓		
2025	Michael Patrick Kelly		Run Free	✓		
2025	Rudimental ft Rag'n'Bone Man		Nights Like These	✓		
2025	Will Linley	Don't Cry Because It's Over	Quite Like Us...	✓		
2025	Tom Grennan	Everywhere I Went, Led Me to Where I Didn't Want to Be	Shadows On The Ceiling	✓		
2025	Tom Grennan	Everywhere I Went, Led Me to Where I Didn't Want to Be	Somewhere Only We Go	✓		
2025	Tom Grennan	Everywhere I Went, Led Me to Where I Didn't Want to Be	I Won't Miss A Thing	✓		
2025	Loi		Get Lucky	✓		
2025	Jack Dean		Rumours	✓		
2025	Tom Grennan	Everywhere I Went, Led Me to Where I Didn't Want to Be	Full Attention	✓		
2025	Zachary Gordon		Days With You	✓		
2025	Jack Dean		Church In The Morning	✓		
2025	Tom Grennan	Everywhere I Went, Led Me to Where I Didn't Want to Be	Boys Don't Cry	✓		
2025	Medun ft. René Miller		Crystal Eyes	✓		
2024	Loi		Left In Your Love	✓	✓	
2024	NCT Dream	Dreamscape	Heavenly	✓	✓	
2024	dearALICE		Best Day Of Our Lives	✓		
2024	Rag'n'Bone Man	What Do You Believe In?	Put A Little Hurt On Me	✓		
2024	Rag'n'Bone Man	What Do You Believe In?	Wreckage	✓		
2024	Clock Clock	Dreamers	Pretty Eyes	Yes		
2024	Calum Scott		Roots	Yes		
2024	Tom Gregory		Glow In The Dark	Yes	Yes	
2024	Cheat Codes, Jason Derulo, Galantis, De la Ghetto		Morning	Yes		Yes
2024	Liam Payne		Teardrops	Yes		
2023	Faul & Wad, Dubdogz		The Way You Lie	Yes	Yes	
2023	Mimi Webb		Back Home For Christmas	Yes		
2023	Zoe Wees	Therapy	Broke	Yes		
2023	James Blunt	Who We Used to Be	A Thousand Lives	Yes		
2023	James Blunt	Who We Used to Be	When You're Gone	Yes	Yes	
2023	James Blunt	Who We Used to Be	Glow	Yes		
2023	James Blunt	Who We Used to Be	Some Kind Of Beautiful	Yes	Yes	
2023	Tom Grennan	What Ifs & Maybes	Before You	Yes		
2023	Tom Grennan	What Ifs & Maybes	This Side Of The Room	Yes		
2023	Tom Grennan	What Ifs & Maybes	Someone I Used To Know	Yes		
2023	Tom Grennan	What Ifs & Maybes	Unbreak A Broken Love	Yes		
2023	Niall Horan	The Show	The Show	Yes		
2023	Niall Horan	The Show	Science	Yes		
2023	Nico Santos	Ride	Real Love	Yes		
2023	Nico Santos	Ride	City Nights	Yes		
2023	René Miller		Wrong Places	Yes	Yes	
2022	Tom Grennan		You Are Not Alone	Yes		Yes
2022	Sam Ryder	There's Nothing but Space, Man!	Crashing Down	Yes		
2022	Ewan Mainwood		Leave Me Lonely	Yes		
2022	Gryffin ft. Matt Maeson	Alive	Lose Your Love	Yes		
2022	Tom Gregory		Forget Somebody	Yes		
2022	Joel Corry, Tom Grennan		Lionheart (Fearless)	Yes		
2022	René Miller		Concrete Heart	Yes	Yes	
2022	Sam Feldt, Gavin James		Better	Yes		
2022	René Miller		Out Of Goodbyes	Yes	Yes	
2022	Tom Grennan		All These Nights	Yes		
2022	Gavin James		Kingdom	Yes		
2022	René Miller		Standing In His Shoes	Yes	Yes	
2022	JP Cooper	She	Kids	Yes		
2022	JP Cooper	She	She	Yes		
2022	JP Cooper	She	Need You Tonight	Yes		
2021	Sam Feldt ft. Rita Ora		Follow Me	Yes		
2021	Michael Patrick Kelly	BOATS	Blurry Eyes	Yes		
2021	Tom Gregory	Things I Can't Say Out Loud	Careless War	Yes		
2021	Camylio		Unbreak	Yes		
2021	Westlife	Wild Dreams	Starlight	Yes		
2021	Calvin Harris ft Tom Grennan		By Your Side	Yes		Yes
2021	Into The Ark		The Show	Yes		Yes
2021	Sophie and the Giants		Don't Ask Me To Change	Yes		Yes
2021	Declan J Donovan		Into The Fire	Yes		Yes
2021	Bow Anderson		Hate That I Fell In Love With You	Yes		
2021	Etham		Somebody Else To Love	Yes		
2021	Into The Ark		Olivia	Yes		
2021	Rebecca Ferguson & Nile Rodgers		No Words Needed	Yes		
2021	Bow Anderson	New Wave EP	New Wave	Yes		
2021	Bow Anderson	New Wave EP	Black Heart	Yes		
2021	Tom Grennan	Evering Road	Little Bit of Love	Yes		Yes
2020	Duncan Laurence	Small Town Boy	Loves You Like I Couldn't Do	Yes		
2020	Bow Anderson		Island	Yes		
2020	Bobby Bazini	Move Away	Love & Alcohol	Yes		
2020	Bow Anderson		Heavy	Yes		
2020	Gavin James		Boxes	Yes		
2020	Niall Horan	Heartbreak Weather	Small Talk	Yes		
2020	Niall Horan	Heartbreak Weather	Arms Of A Stranger	Yes		
2020	Niall Horan	Heartbreak Weather	Still	Yes		Yes
2020	Robinson	Watching You EP	Watching You	Yes		
2020	Elias		Need You Now			Yes
2020	JP Cooper		In These Arms	Yes		Yes
2019	Niall Horan	Heartbreak Weather	Put a Little Love on Me	Yes		Yes
2019	Westlife	Spectrum	Another Life			Yes
2019	New Rules	New Rules EP	24 Hours	Yes		
2019	New Rules	New Rules EP	Night Like This	Yes		
2019	Jack Vallier		Copenhagen	Yes		
2019	Michael Schulte	Highs & Lows	Someone	Yes		
2019	Danny Jones	$igns	Talk In The Morning	Yes		
2019	Danny Jones	$igns	$igns	Yes		
2019	James TW	Chapters	'Incredible'	Yes		
2019	Milow	Break The Silence	'Help'	Yes		
2019	Milow	Break The Silence	'She'	Yes		
2019	Milow	Break The Silence	'Break The Silence'	Yes		
2018	Gavin James	Only Ticket Home	'Tired'	Yes		
2018	Gavin James	Only Ticket Home	'Faces'	Yes		
2018	Liv Dawson	Bedroom EP	'Good Intentions'	Yes		
2018	Leo Stannard	Maratea	'5 Years Later'	Yes		
2018	Emma Jensen		'Rush'	Yes		
2018	Royal Wood	Ever After The Farewell	'Made of Gold'	Yes		
2018	Royal Wood	Ever After The Farewell	'King & Queen'	Yes		
2018	Royal Wood	Ever After The Farewell	'Midnight Hour'	Yes		
2018	Royal Wood	Ever After The Farewell	'Nowhere to be Found'	Yes		
2018	Royal Wood	Ever After The Farewell	'Old Young Love'	Yes		
2018	Liv Dawson		'Talk'	Yes		
2017	Michael Patrick Kelly	iD	'Roundabouts'	Yes		
2017	Niall Horan	Flicker	'Mirrors'	Yes		
2017	River Matthews	Imogen	'Feels Like Morning'	Yes		
2017	River Matthews	Imogen	'Over'	Yes		
2017	River Matthews	Imogen	'Undo Ordinary'	Yes		
2017	River Matthews	Imogen	'Light The Way'	Yes		
2017	Alan Walker		'Tired'	Yes		
2017	Rag'n'Bone Man	Human	'Skin'	Yes		
2016	Niall Horan	Flicker	'This Town'	Yes		
2016	The Beach		'Geronimo'	Yes	Yes	
2015	One Direction	Made in the A.M.	'What A Feeling'	Yes	Yes	
2015	One Direction	Made in the A.M.	'Home'		Yes	
2015	Ella Henderson	Chapter One	'Missed'		Yes	
2015	Ella Henderson	Chapter One	'All Again'		Yes	
2015	Luhan	Reloaded	'Medals'	Yes		

== Awards and nominations ==
Ivor Novello Award

Year	Nominee / work	Award	Result
2022	Little Bit Of Love	PRS For Music Award	Nominated
