= What a Feeling =

What a Feeling may refer to:

- "What a Feeling" (Alex Gaudino song), a 2011 song by Alex Gaudino featuring Kelly Rowland
- "What a Feeling" (Namie Amuro song), a 2008 song by Namie Amuro
- "What a Feeling" (One Direction song), a 2015 song by One Direction
- What a Feelin', a 1983 album by Irene Cara
- "Flashdance... What a Feeling", a song from the 1983 film Flashdance

== See also ==
- "What is this Feeling?", song from the musical Wicked
