= Evering Road =

Studio album by Tom Grennan
- Released: 12 March 2021
- Genre: Indie pop
- Length: 46:00
- Label: Insanity
- Producers: Dan Grech-Marguerat; Lostboy; Mark Ralph; The Six; Dan Bryer; Jamie Scott; Mark Crew; Dan Priddy; Jim Eliot; Jonny Lattimer; Ollie Green; Eg White; Zach Witness; Charlie Hugall; Eddie Serafica; Jimmy Hogarth; TMS

Tom Grennan chronology
Lighting Matches (2018)	Evering Road (2021)	What Ifs & Maybes (2023)

Singles from Evering Road
- 1. "This Is the Place" Released: 20 January 2020; 2. "Oh Please" Released: 23 April 2020; 3. "Amen" Released: 1 October 2020; 4. "Little Bit of Love" Released: 8 January 2021

Singles from Evering Road (Deluxe/Special Edition)
- 1. "By Your Side" Released: 4 June 2021; 2. "Don't Break the Heart" Released: 3 September 2021

Professional ratings
Review scores
Source	Rating
Belfast Telegraph	7/10
Clash	8/10
Evening Standard	3/5 stars
Gigwise	6/10 stars
i	3/5 stars
The Line of Best Fit	7/10
NME	3/5 stars

Evering Road is the second studio album by English singer-songwriter Tom Grennan, released on 12 March 2021 through Insanity Records. It was supported by the singles "This Is the Place" and "Little Bit of Love", while the deluxe edition includes the single "Let's Go Home Together" with Ella Henderson. The album debuted at number one on the UK Albums Chart, becoming Grennan's first chart-topping effort.

A special edition of the album was released on 3 September 2021 featuring five additional songs. The tracks are re-ordered on the digital edition of the album, but the original order is retained on the CD, with the five new songs added at the end, and the 21 tracks spread over two discs.

== Background ==
The title is the name of a street in Hackney, London where Grennan lived with an ex-girlfriend, and the album was partially inspired by their breakup.

== Critical reception ==
David Smyth of the Evening Standard compared Grennan to Lewis Capaldi, positing that the album could be "an attempt to jump ahead [of Capaldi] again" with the bombast of its production (including "stirring violins, gospel choirs and grand flourishes") and Grennan's hoarse voice. Reviewing the album for NME, El Hunt called the album an improvement over Lighting Matches with some "surprising [...] experimental moments" but primarily "nondescript" and "middle of the road", with Hunt wishing that Grennan pushed his sound further.

Writing for British newspaper i, Kate Solomon felt that "Grennan is very good at the contemplative verse-anthemic chorus-contemplative middle-eight structure that lends itself to V Festival sets and his gravelly voice is strong and likeable", but criticised Grennan for having an "aggressive self-interest" on the album and "repeatedly ask[ing] others to make allowances for him" in its lyrics, deeming it "totally devoid of empathy".

== Commercial performance ==
Evering Road debuted at number one on the UK Albums Chart dated 19 March 2021, with 17,000 chart sales, 73% of which came from physical copies.

== Track listing ==
Evering Road track listing
No.	Title	Writer(s)	Producer(s)	Length
1.	"If Only"	Thomas Grennan; Harley Sulé; Fergus Brignall	Dan Grech-Marguerat	3:30
2.	"Something Better"	Grennan; Thomas Mann; Peter Rycroft	Lostboy	3:03
3.	"Little Bit of Love"	Grennan; Daniel Bryer; Mike Needle	Lostboy; Bryer; Jamie Scott; Needle^{[v]}	3:46
4.	"Amen"	Grennan; Josh Record; Tinashe Fazakerley; Wayne Hector; Lucian Nagy	Mark Crew; Dan Priddy; Rationale^{[c]}; Nagy^{[c]}	2:59
5.	"It Hurts"	Grennan; Jim Eliot	Eliot	3:48
6.	"Never Be a Right Time"	Grennan; Jez Ashurst; Nicholas Atkinson	Mark Ralph	3:04
7.	"This Is the Place"	Grennan; Daniel Smith; Richard Boardman; Pablo Bowman; Sarah Blanchard; Daniel Boyle; David Solence	The Six; Ralph	3:05
8.	"Sweeter Then"	Grennan; Sulé; Brignall	Grech-Marguerat	3:24
9.	"Make My Mind Up"	Grennan; Jonny Lattimer	Lattimer	3:17
10.	"Second Time"	Grennan; Ashurst; Atkinson	Grech-Marguerat	3:13
11.	"You Matter to Me"	Grennan; Ollie Green	Green	3:13
12.	"Oh Please"	Grennan; Zachary Witness; Francis White	Eg White; Witness	3:40
13.	"I Don't Need a Reason"	Grennan; Kieron McIntosh; Charlie Hugall	Hugall; Eddie Serafica	2:52
14.	"Love Has Different Ways to Say Goodbye"	Grennan; Lauren Aquilina; Jimmy Hogarth	Hogarth	3:06
Total length:				46:00

Deluxe edition bonus tracks
No.	Title	Writer(s)	Producer(s)	Length
15.	"Let's Go Home Together" (with Ella Henderson)	Gabriella Henderson; James Arthur; Thomas Barnes; Peter Kelleher; Benjamin Kohn	TMS	3:28
16.	"Long Live You and I"	Grennan; Smith; Anya Jones; Boardman; Solence	The Six	2:45
Total length:				52:13

Evering Road (Special Edition) track listing
No.	Title	Writer(s)	Producer(s)	Length
1.	"Don't Break the Heart"	Grennan; Mann; Barnes; Kelleher; Kohn	TMS	3:50
2.	"Little Bit of Love"	Grennan; Bryer; Needle	Lostboy; Bryer; Scott; Needle	3:46
3.	"If Only"	Grennan; Sulé; Brignall	Grech-Marguerat	3:30
4.	"It Hurts"	Grennan; Eliot	Eliot	3:48
5.	"Let's Go Home Together" (with Ella Henderson)	Henderson; Arthur; Barnes; Kelleher; Kohn	TMS	3:28
6.	"This Is the Place"	Grennan; Smith; Bowman; Blanchard; Boyle; Solence	Ralph	3:05
7.	"Never Be a Right Time"	Grennan; Atkinson	Ralph	3:04
8.	"Sweeter Then"	Grennan; Sulé; Brignall	Grech-Marguerat	3:24
9.	"Make My Mind Up"	Grennan; Lattimer	Lattimer	3:17
10.	"By Your Side" (Calvin Harris featuring Tom Grennan)	Grennan; Adam Wiles; Jamie Scott; John Newman; Mike Needle; Theo Hutchcraft	Harris	3:11
11.	"Something Better"	Grennan; Mann; Peter Rycroft	Lostboy	3:03
12.	"You Matter to Me"	Grennan; Ollie Green	Green	3:13
13.	"Second Time"	Grennan; Ashurst; Atkinson	Grech-Marguerat	3:13
14.	"Oh Please"	Grennan; Witness; White	White; Witness	3:40
15.	"I Don't Need a Reason"	Grennan; McIntosh; Hugall	Hugall; Serafica	2:52
16.	"Amen"	Grennan; Record; Fazakerley; Hector; Nagy	Crew; Dan Priddy; Nagy	2:59
17.	"Love Has Different Ways to Say Goodbye"	Grennan; Aquilina; Hogarth	Hogarth	3:06
18.	"Long Live You and I"	Grennan; Smith; Anya Jones; Boardman; Solence	The Six	2:45
19.	"People Always Meant to Be"	Grennan; Ed Thomas; Michael Stafford	Thomas	3:56
20.	"Being Angry"	Grennan; Green; Danny Connors; Ivory Layne	Green	2:51
21.	"Little Bit of Love" (Live from Abbey Road)	Grennan; Bryer; Needle	Rosie Danvers; Tommy Danvers	3:41

== Charts ==
=== Weekly charts ===
Weekly chart performance for Evering Road
Chart (2021–2022)	Peak position
Australian Hitseekers Albums (ARIA)	3
Dutch Albums (Album Top 100)	50
French Albums (SNEP)	111
Irish Albums (Official Charts)	19
Scottish Albums (Official Charts)	2
Slovakia Airplay (ČNS IFPI)	87
UK Albums (Official Charts)	1

=== Year-end charts ===
2021 year-end chart performance for Evering Road
Chart (2021)	Position
UK Albums (OCC)	52

2022 year-end chart performance for Evering Road
Chart (2022)	Position
UK Albums (OCC)	93

== Certifications ==
Certifications for Evering Road
Region	Certification	Certified units/sales
United Kingdom (BPI)	Gold	100,000^{‡}
^{‡} Sales+streaming figures based on certification alone.
