= Don't Break the Heart =

2021 single by Tom Grennan

Single by Tom Grennan

from the album Evering Road (Special Edition)
- Released: 3 September 2021
- Length: 3:50
- Label: Insanity
- Songwriters: Ben Kohn; Chris Loco; Pete Kelleher; Tom Barnes; Tom Grennan; Tom Mann
- Producer: TMS

Tom Grennan singles chronology
"By Your Side" (2021)	"Don't Break the Heart" (2021)	"Remind Me" (2022)

Music video
- "Don't Break the Heart" on YouTube

"Don't Break the Heart" is a song by English singer-songwriter Tom Grennan. It was released on 3 September 2021 as the third single from the special edition of his second studio album Evering Road. The song was written by Grennan, Ben Kohn, Chris Loco, Pete Kelleher, Tom Barnes and Tom Mann, and produced by TMS.

== Background ==
On the inspiration behind the song, Grennan stated:

Recently I received the tragic news of a friend’s mum’s passing. It hit me hard watching him comprehend what had happened, trying to compute the madness and sadness of his new world now that his mum whom he loved so dearly had passed. It triggered memories for me of the loss of my cousin and best friend Alan when I was just a teenager, it broke so many of us. The song unravelled from me quite quickly. It was cathartic on many levels, thoughts of loss and heartbreak, dealing with the grief of death, or the breakdown of a relationship or friendship. These are all things that seem to have dominated my life in recent years, but sadly never get any easier to navigate. I’m grateful that the passing of time allows us to look back and remember the good times.

== Content ==
Liv Rose of Gig Goer described "Don't Break the Heart" as "a euphoric track inspired by personal loss and grief. As gentle, acoustic guitars build to powerful percussion", featuring as "tackles complex human emotions in a remarkably uplifting way". The song is written in the key of C♯ minor, with a tempo of 123 beats per minute.

== Music video ==
An accompanying video was released on 29 September 2021, And it Was Released On 4 December 2021 On Radio.

== Credits and personnel ==
Credits adapted from Tidal.

- TMS – producer
- Ben Kohn – composer, lyricist, programmer, synthesizer
- Chris Loco – composer, lyricist
- Pete Kelleher – composer, lyricist, keyboards
- Tom Barnes – composer, lyricist, drums
- Tom Grennan – composer, lyricist, associated performer, background vocal, drums
- Tom Mann – composer, lyricist
- Dan Bartlett – bass, drums, guitar, synthesizer
- Ollie Green – engineer, piano, recording engineer
- Vern Asbury – guitar
- Chris Gehringer – mastering engineer
- Dan D'Lion – misc producer
- Dan Grech – mixing engineer

== Charts ==
=== Weekly charts ===
Chart performance for "Don't Break the Heart"
Chart (2021–2022)	Peak position
Belgium (Ultratop 50 Flanders)	38
CIS Airplay (TopHit)	189
Czech Republic Airplay (ČNS IFPI)	27
Ireland (IRMA)	100
Netherlands (Dutch Top 40)	13
Netherlands (Single Top 100)	54
New Zealand Hot Singles (RMNZ)	4
Poland Airplay (ZPAV)	5
Slovakia Airplay (ČNS IFPI)	8
UK Singles (Official Charts)	49

=== Year-end charts ===
Year-end chart performance for "Don't Break the Heart"
Chart (2022)	Position
Poland (ZPAV)	93

== Certifications ==
Certifications for "Don't Break the Heart"
Region	Certification	Certified units/sales
Netherlands (NVPI)	Gold	40,000^{‡}
Poland (ZPAV)	Gold	25,000^{‡}
United Kingdom (BPI)	Gold	400,000^{‡}
^{‡} Sales+streaming figures based on certification alone.
