= Midnight Butterflies =

Studio album by Sea Girls
- Released: 14 June 2024
- Studio: Destined (London); Soho (London); Kore (London); Richmond (London); Vale (London); Pershore (London); The Gin Factory (London); One Eyed Jacks (London); Sharp Sonics (Los Angeles)
- Length: 39:00
- Label: Alt
- Producer: Boo; Dan Bryer; Rich Cooper; Nick Hahn; Martin Hannah; Oli Jacobs; The Nocturns; Matt Schwartz; Rory Young

Sea Girls chronology
The Hometown Tour Live (2023)	Midnight Butterflies (2024)	Live at BBC Maida Vale (2024)

Singles from Midnight Butterflies
- 1. "Weekends and Workdays" Released: 21 September 2023; 2. "Young Strangers" Released: 17 November 2023; 3. "I Want You to Know Me" Released: 10 January 2024; 4. "Midnight Butterflies" Released: 21 March 2024; 5. "Come Back to Me" Released: 2 May 2024; 6. "Polly" Released: 30 May 2024

Professional ratings
Review scores
Source	Rating
The Arts Desk	3/5 stars
Dork	4/5 stars
The Independent	7/10

Midnight Butterflies is the third studio album by English indie rock band Sea Girls. It was released on 14 June 2024 under the band's own independent label, Alt. Records, in collaboration with Believe.

== Track listing ==
Midnight Butterflies track listing
No.	Title	Writer(s)	Producer(s)	Length
1.	"Midnight Butterflies"	Henry Camamile; Matt Schwartz	Schwartz	3:28
2.	"I Want You to Know Me"	Dan Bryer; Camamile	Bryer; Martin Hannah	3:36
3.	"Come Back to Me"	Camamile; Joe Housley; Charlie Martin	The Nocturns	2:33
4.	"Horror Movies"	Bryer; Camamile	Bryer; Hannah	4:23
5.	"Does Only God Know That We're Lonely?"	Bryer; Camamile	Bryer; Hannah	3:02
6.	"Scream and Shout"	Boo; Camamile	Boo	3:21
7.	"Weekends and Workdays"	Camamile; Housley; Martin	The Nocturns	3:26
8.	"Superman"	Camamile; Nick Hahn	Hahn	3:09
9.	"First on My List"	Camamile; Rich Cooper; Justin Parker	Cooper	3:10
10.	"Young Strangers"	Camamile; Kid Harpoon	Oli Jacobs	3:22
11.	"Polly"	Bryer; Camamile	Bryer; Hannah	2:23
12.	"After Hours"	Camamile; Rory Young	Young; Alex O'Donovan^{[a]}	3:07
Total length:				39:00

Note

- ^{^[a]} signifies an additional producer

== Personnel ==
Sea Girls

- Henry Camamile – vocals, guitar
- Rory Young – guitar, backing vocals
- Andrew Dawson – bass, backing vocals
- Oli Khan – drums, keyboards, synthesizer (all tracks); piano (track 6)

Additional musicians

- Matt Schwartz – programming, keyboards, additional guitar (track 1)
- Dan Bryer – programming (tracks 2, 4, 5, 11), additional guitar (2, 4, 11), additional backing vocals (2, 5, 11)
- Martin Hannah – programming (tracks 2, 4, 5, 11), additional guitar (4, 5, 11)
- Charlie Martin – piano, additional guitar, additional synthesizer (tracks 3, 7)
- Joe Housley – additional synthesizer, additional backing vocals (tracks 3, 7)
- Boo – synthesizer, drums, additional backing vocals (track 6)
- Nick Hahn – additional synthesizers, programming (track 8)
- Rich Cooper – synthesizer, additional guitar, additional piano (track 9)
- Oli Jacobs – piano, percussion, additional synthesizer, backing vocals, programming (track 10)
- Jonathan Gilmore – programming (track 10)
- Stars Grafftey – additional backing vocals (track 11)
- Alex O'Donovan – programming, percussion (track 12)

Technical

- Joe LaPorta – mastering
- Matt Schwartz – mixing, engineering (track 1)
- Matty Green – mixing (tracks 2–4, 7)
- Martin Hannah – mixing (tracks 5, 11), engineering (2, 4, 5, 11)
- Boo – mixing (track 6)
- Nick Hahn – mixing (track 8)
- Rich Cooper – mixing, engineering (track 9)
- Jonathan Gilmore – mixing (track 10)
- Alex O'Donovan – mixing, engineering (track 12)
- Chris D'Adda – engineering (tracks 3, 7)
- Oli Middleton – engineering (tracks 9, 10), live drums engineering (1)
- Freddy Williams – mixing assistance (track 10)
- Tom Baird – engineering assistance (track 10)
- Ron Tichon – additional drum editing (track 1)

Visuals

- Megan Doherty – creative direction, photography
- Jake Greenway – design

== Charts ==
Chart performance for Midnight Butterflies
Chart (2024)	Peak position
Scottish Albums (OCC)	4
UK Albums (OCC)	5
UK Independent Albums (OCC)	1
