= Shane Codd =

Irish DJ and record producer (born 1997)

- Born: 21 December 1997 (age 28); Dublin, Ireland
- Origin: Bailieborough, County Cavan, Ireland
- Years active: 2018–present
- Label: Polydor
- Website: shanecodd.ie

Shane Codd (born 21 December 1997) is an Irish DJ and record producer signed to Polydor Records. He is known for his song "Get Out My Head", which reached the top 10 in Ireland and the UK in January 2021.

== Early and personal life ==
Codd was born in Dublin but moved to Bailieborough, County Cavan aged 11. He is now based in London where he lives in an apartment overlooking The O2 Arena.

He currently studies business and Irish at Dublin City University, however, he had to put this on hold due to the breakthrough of his single "Get Out My Head".

== Career ==
His musical influences are dance music of the 1990s and 2000s and also EDM artists like Avicii and Swedish House Mafia.

In the 2018 Breakout Producer competition held by Mark McCabe, Shane was a finalist and has had his music aired on Irish station SPIN 1038. He has performed in cities and towns across Ireland.

His debut single "Get Out My Head" was released in May 2020. It was first released on SoundCloud, where it got the attention of Polydor Records, who signed him soon after. The song peaked at number five on the Irish Singles Chart and number six on the UK Singles Chart. The song also reached number 2 on The Official Big Top 40.

In December 2020, Codd reached the top spot on the Music Moves Europe Talent Chart with "Get Out My Head" and remained there for three weeks. In the same month, he also released a video for "Get Out My Head".

== Discography ==
=== Singles ===
Title	Year	Peak chart positions				Album
Title	Year	IRE	BEL (FL)	SCO	UK	Album
"Get Out My Head"	2020	5	16	10	6	Non-album single
"Always On My Mind" (featuring Charlotte Haining)	2021	91	—	—	—	Non-album single
"It Ain't Right"	2021	76	—	—	—	Non-album single
"Love Me or Let Me Go"	2022	—	—	—	—	Non-album single
"Rather Be Alone"	2022	—	—	—	—	Non-album single
"Same Mistake" (featuring BIM)	2023	—	—	—	—	Non-album single
"Used to Be" (with Welshy)	2023	—	—	—	—	Non-album single
"Something More"	2023	—	—	—	—	Non-album single

=== Remixes ===
Title	Year	Original artist(s)
"Space"	2021	Becky Hill
"New Love"	2021	Silk City, Ellie Goulding
"Don't Play"	2021	Anne-Marie, KSI, Digital Farm Animals
"Astronaut in the Ocean"	2021	Masked Wolf
"Love (Sweet Love)"	2021	Little Mix
"Losing My Mind"	2022	Lyra
