= Get Out My Head (Shane Codd song) =

Single by Shane Codd
- Released: 25 May 2020
- Genre: House
- Length: 3:24
- Label: Polydor
- Songwriter: Shane Codd
- Producer: Shane Codd

Shane Codd singles chronology
"Get Out My Head" (2020)	"Always On My Mind" (2021)

Music video
- "Get Out My Head" on YouTube

"Get Out My Head" is a song by Irish DJ and producer Shane Codd, who wrote and produced the song. Featuring uncredited vocals from Solah, it was released on 25 May 2020 by Polydor Records. "Get Out My Head" peaked at number five on the Irish Singles Chart. Outside Ireland, the single peaked within the top ten of the charts in the United Kingdom.

== Background ==
Talking about the song, Codd said, "I wanted to get out and do things and I also wanted the stress of COVID out of my head, like I'm sure a lot of us did. The vocals really sat with me, making the track was like an escape for me. I remember the first time I played it in my car I got a release and a feel good vibe of it. I imagined festivals and people dancing, which felt like a distant memory during COVID-19. I posted the track online and immediately got a reaction. I was blown away. People were sharing it and tagging me, I was grateful and happy they liked it. I received messages from some people saying that it helped them during lockdown and that for them it was the tune of 2020, I couldn't believe the reaction it was getting."

In December 2020, the song reached the spot on Music Moves Europe Talent Chart and remained there for three weeks. In the same month, a video was released for it.

On 5 February 2021, a remix featuring British rappers Swarmz and S1mba was released.

On 18 February 2021, a remix by American DJ Todd Terry was released.

== Personnel ==
Credits adapted from Tidal.

- Shane Codd – producer, composer, lyricist, associated performer, music production, programmer
- Stuart Hawkes – mastering engineer, studio personnel
- James F. Reynolds – mixer, studio personnel
- Solah – uncredited vocals

== Charts ==
=== Weekly charts ===
Weekly chart performance of "Get Out My Head"
Chart (2020–2021)	Peak position
Belgium (Ultratop 50 Flanders)	16
Belgium (Ultratop 50 Wallonia)	31
Ireland (IRMA)	5
Netherlands (Dutch Top 40)	12
Netherlands (Single Top 100)	32
New Zealand Hot Singles (RMNZ)	19
Poland Airplay (ZPAV)	5
Scotland Singles (OCC)	10
UK Singles (OCC)	6
UK Dance (OCC)	2

=== Year-end charts ===
Year-end chart performance of "Get Out My Head"
Chart (2021)	Position
Belgium (Ultratop Flanders)	54
Ireland (IRMA)	32
Netherlands (Dutch Top 40)	67
Poland (ZPAV)	43
UK Singles (OCC)	39

== Certifications ==
Region	Certification	Certified units/sales
Poland (ZPAV)	Gold	25,000^{‡}
United Kingdom (BPI)	Platinum	600,000^{‡}
^{‡} Sales+streaming figures based on certification alone.

== Release history ==
Region	Date	Format	Label	Ref.
Ireland	25 May 2020	Digital download; streaming	Polydor Records	
