= Let's Go Home Together =

2021 single by Ella Henderson and Tom Grennan

Single by Ella Henderson and Tom Grennan

from the album Everything I Didn't Say
- Released: 19 February 2021
- Recorded: 2021
- Studio: Los Angeles (The Mixsuite); UK (The Music Shed, RAK, The Church, Wired Masters)
- Length: 3:28
- Label: Major Tom's; Asylum; Warner
- Songwriters: Ella Henderson; Ben Kohn; Pete "Merf" Kelleher; Tom "Froe" Barnes; James Arthur
- Producer: TMS

Ella Henderson singles chronology
"Blame It on the Mistletoe" (2020)	"Let's Go Home Together" (2021)	"Risk It All" (2021)

Tom Grennan singles chronology
"Little Bit of Love" (2021)	"Let's Go Home Together" (2021)	"By Your Side" (2021)

Music video
- "Let's Go Home Together" on YouTube

"Let's Go Home Together" is a song by English singers and songwriters Ella Henderson and Tom Grennan. It was released as a digital download and for streaming on 19 February 2021. The song was released as the lead single from Henderson's second studio album Everything I Didn't Say and is also featured on the deluxe edition of Grennan's second studio album Evering Road.

The song was a commercial success; it peaked at number 10 on the UK singles chart becoming Henderson's fifth top ten and Grennan's second top 10. Elsewhere it peaked at number 11 on Irish singles chart. "Let's Go Home Together" peaked inside the top 40 on the 2021 year end chart in the UK at number 25 and in Ireland at number 38, respectively. It has since been certified double platinum for shipping 1,200,000 combined units and sales in the United Kingdom. It was also nominated for Best Song Musically and Lyrically at the 2022 Ivor Novello Awards.

== Background ==
Talking about the song and the collaboration, Henderson said, "This song has always been so special to me that I kept going back to it. Tom and I have been friends for years, I love his voice and I’m so happy we got to do this together." Grennan said, "When Ella hit me up and played me this song and then asked me to join her on it, I was absolutely buzzin’. Ella is a good mate of mine and it's so sick to finally get to sing together!"

== Reception ==
In April 2022, "Let's Go Home Together" was nominated for an Ivor Novello Award for the Best Song Musically and Lyrically at the 2022 Ivor Novello Awards.

== Music video ==
A music video to accompany the release of "Let's Go Home Together" was first released onto YouTube on 25 February 2021. The video was directed by Michael Holyk and shows Henderson and Grennan at the pub with their own group of friends.

== Live performances ==
On 20 February 2021, they performed the song live on The Graham Norton Show. On 26 March 2021, they performed the song live on The One Show.

== Track listing ==
Digital download
No.	Title	Length
1.	"Let's Go Home Together"	3:28

Digital download
No.	Title	Length
1.	"Let's Go Home Together" (Luca Schreiner Remix)	2:50

Digital download
No.	Title	Length
1.	"Let's Go Home Together" (Charlie Hedges & Eddie Craig Remix)	3:54

Digital download
No.	Title	Length
1.	"Let's Go Home Together" (Madism Remix)	3:24

== Personnel and credits ==
Credits adapted from Tidal and album booklet.

=== Recording locations ===
- The MixSuite (Los Angeles)
- The Music Shed (UK)
- RAK Studios (UK) – Tom Grennan's vocals
- The Church (UK) – Tom Grennan's vocals
- Wired Masters (UK)

=== Personnel ===
- Vern Asbury – guitar
- Tom "Froe" Barnes – drums
- Chris Bishop - assistant engineer
- Kevin Grainger - mastering
- Ollie Green - vocal producer (for Tom Grennan)
- Tom Grennan - background vocals
- Ella Henderson - lead vocals
- Peter "Merf" Kelleher – synths
- Sam Klempner - assistant engineer
- Benjamin Kohn - piano
- Mark "Spike Strent" - audio mixer
- TMS – producer, engineer
- Dante Hemingway - producer, programming, vocal production (for Ella Henderson)
- Matt Wollach - assistant audio mixer

== Charts ==
=== Weekly charts ===
Weekly chart performance for "Let's Go Home Together"
Chart (2021)	Peak position
Croatia International Airplay (Top lista)	59
Euro Digital Song Sales (Billboard)	3
Ireland (IRMA)	11
UK Singles (Official Charts)	10

=== Year-end charts ===
Year-end chart performance for "Let's Go Home Together"
Chart (2021)	Position
Ireland (IRMA)	38
UK Singles (OCC)	25

== Certifications ==
Certifications for "Let's Go Home Together"
Region	Certification	Certified units/sales
New Zealand (RMNZ)	Gold	15,000^{‡}
United Kingdom (BPI)	2× Platinum	1,200,000^{‡}
^{‡} Sales+streaming figures based on certification alone.

== Release history ==
Release history for "Let's Go Home Together"
Region	Date	Format	Label	Ref.
Various	19 February 2021	Digital download; streaming	Asylum	
