= Little Bit of Love (Tom Grennan song) =

Single by Tom Grennan

from the album Evering Road
- Released: 8 January 2021
- Length: 3:46
- Label: Insanity
- Songwriters: Dan Bryer; Mike Needle; Tom Grennan
- Producers: Dan Bryer; Jamie Scott; Lostboy

Tom Grennan singles chronology
| "Amen" (2020) | "Little Bit of Love" (2021) | "Let's Go Home Together" (2021) |

Music video
- "Little bit of Love" on YouTube

"Little Bit of Love" is a song by English singer and songwriter Tom Grennan. It was released as a digital download and for streaming on 8 January 2021 as the fourth single from his second studio album, Evering Road. The song was written by Dan Bryer, Mike Needle and Grennan. The work was later nominated for the PRS for Music Most Performed Work Ivor Novello Award.

== Background ==
Grennan announced the release of the single on his Twitter account on 6 January 2021. Talking about the song, he said, "'Little Bit Of Love' is all about the mental struggle of moving on, or going back to a relationship."

== Music video ==
A music video for the song was released on 15 January 2021 at a total length of three minutes and forty-six seconds. The video was directed by Keane Shaw and features Grennan and actor Luke Kelly and was inspired by Tom's relationship with his little brother. Talking about the video Grennan said, "This video is a representation of toxic masculinity and unconditional love, told via a story of two brothers. It was amazing to bring my song to life with one of my closest and long-time friends Keane Shaw, not only a close friend but someone whose artistic vision I admire immensely."

== Track listing ==
Digital download and stream
| No. | Title | Length |
|---|---|---|
| 1. | "Little Bit of Love" | 3:46 |
| 2. | "Something Better" | 3:03 |
| 3. | "Amen" | 2:59 |
| 4. | "Oh Please" | 3:40 |
| 5. | "This is the Place" | 3:05 |

Digital download and stream
| No. | Title | Length |
|---|---|---|
| 1. | "Little Bit of Love" (Acoustic) | 3:36 |

Digital download and stream
| No. | Title | Length |
|---|---|---|
| 1. | "Little Bit of Love" (Welshy Remix) | 3:15 |
| 2. | "Little Bit of Love" (Madism Remix) | 2:54 |

== Personnel ==
Credits adapted from Tidal.

- Dan Bryer – producer, composer, lyricist, background vocal, programmer, vocal producer
- Jamie Scott – producer, background vocal
- Lostboy – producer, guitar, piano
- Mike Needle – composer, lyricist, background vocal, vocal producer
- Tom Grennan – composer, lyricist, background vocal, vocal
- Alex Charles - backing vocal
- Martin Hannah – engineer
- Matt Cooke – engineer
- Chris Gehringer – mastering engineer
- Dan Grech – mixing engineer

== Charts ==
=== Weekly charts ===
2021–2022 weekly chart performance for "Little Bit of Love"
| Chart (2021–2022) | Peak position |
|---|---|
| Australia (ARIA) | 16 |
| Austria (Ö3 Austria Top 40) | 21 |
| Belgium (Ultratop 50 Flanders) | 7 |
| Croatia International Airplay (Top lista) | 13 |
| Czech Republic Airplay (ČNS IFPI) | 7 |
| Czech Republic Singles Digital (ČNS IFPI) | 76 |
| Denmark (Tracklisten) | 39 |
| France (SNEP) | 58 |
| Germany (GfK) | 53 |
| Hungary (Rádiós Top 40) | 2 |
| Hungary (Single Top 40) | 28 |
| Iceland (Tónlistinn) | 21 |
| Ireland (IRMA) | 6 |
| Netherlands (Dutch Top 40) | 3 |
| Netherlands (Single Top 100) | 14 |
| New Zealand (Recorded Music NZ) | 39 |
| Poland Airplay (ZPAV) | 2 |
| Romania Airplay (Media Forest) | 11 |
| Slovakia Airplay (ČNS IFPI) | 2 |
| Slovakia Singles Digital (ČNS IFPI) | 38 |
| Sweden (Sverigetopplistan) | 54 |
| Switzerland (Schweizer Hitparade) | 24 |
| UK Singles (Official Charts) | 7 |
| US Adult Top 40 (Billboard) | 27 |

2025 weekly chart performance for "Little Bit of Love"
| Chart (2025) | Peak position |
|---|---|
| Estonia Airplay (TopHit) | 99 |

=== Monthly charts ===
Monthly chart performance for "Little Bit of Love"
| Chart (2021) | Position |
|---|---|
| Latvia Airplay (LaIPA) | 58 |

=== Year-end charts ===
2021 year-end chart performance for "Little Bit of Love"
| Chart (2021) | Position |
|---|---|
| Australia (ARIA) | 59 |
| Austria (Ö3 Austria Top 40) | 45 |
| Belgium (Ultratop Flanders) | 20 |
| Ireland (IRMA) | 18 |
| Netherlands (Dutch Top 40) | 14 |
| Netherlands (Single Top 100) | 48 |
| Poland (ZPAV) | 11 |
| Sweden (Sverigetopplistan) | 88 |
| Switzerland (Schweizer Hitparade) | 47 |
| UK Singles (OCC) | 20 |

2022 year-end chart performance for "Little Bit of Love"
| Chart (2022) | Position |
|---|---|
| Belgium (Ultratop 50 Flanders) | 184 |
| Hungary (Rádiós Top 40) | 57 |

== Certifications ==
Certifications for "Little Bit of Love"
| Region | Certification | Certified units/sales |
|---|---|---|
| Australia (ARIA) | Platinum | 70,000^{‡} |
| Austria (IFPI Austria) | 2× Platinum | 60,000^{‡} |
| Canada (Music Canada) | Gold | 40,000^{‡} |
| Denmark (IFPI Danmark) | Platinum | 90,000^{‡} |
| France (SNEP) | Platinum | 200,000^{‡} |
| Germany (BVMI) | Gold | 200,000^{‡} |
| Netherlands (NVPI) | Platinum | 80,000^{‡} |
| Poland (ZPAV) | Platinum | 50,000^{‡} |
| Switzerland (IFPI Switzerland) | Platinum | 20,000^{‡} |
| United Kingdom (BPI) | 2× Platinum | 1,200,000^{‡} |
^{‡} Sales+streaming figures based on certification alone.
