= By Your Side (Calvin Harris song) =

2021 single by Calvin Harris

Single by Calvin Harris featuring Tom Grennan

from the album Evering Road (special edition)
- Released: 4 June 2021
- Genre: Dance
- Length: 3:10 (radio edit); 5:15 (extended radio edit); 5:30 (single album version); 8:05 (extended club mix)
- Label: Sony; Columbia
- Songwriters: Adam Wiles; Theo Hutchcraft; Mike Needle; John Newman; Jamie Scott
- Producer: Calvin Harris

Calvin Harris singles chronology
"Over Now" (2020)	"By Your Side" (2021)	"We Can Come Together" (2021)

Tom Grennan singles chronology
"Let's Go Home Together" (2021)	"By Your Side" (2021)	"Don't Break the Heart" (2021)

Music video
- "By Your Side" on YouTube

"By Your Side" is a song by Scottish DJ and record producer Calvin Harris featuring English singer Tom Grennan, released on 4 June 2021 via Sony Music. It was included on Harris' first compilation album, 96 Months (2024).

== Background ==
On 4 June 2021, Grennan shared a video on Twitter, captioning it "this is going to be the summer we've all been waiting for."

In an interview with Apple Music 1's Zane Lowe, Harris said: "The first thing is I liked Grennan's voice a lot. I started following him on Instagram. And I was struck by his positivity, his relentless positivity in his posts... So when I figured out what the song was going to sound like, he seemed like such an obvious choice."

== Composition ==
Harris described the song as "nostalgic", and said: "In a nice way. The sort of thing that nobody else is making it, so that feels good. And regardless of how it does or whatever, it felt really nice to me."

== Reception ==
Ellie Mullins of website We Rave You described "By Your Side" as the most essential summer anthem for 2021, writing that "Grennan's influence is heard and not just through the vocals either but also through the fun, upbeat guitars that can be found throughout" and "Harris is on top form with upbeat productions and synths that beg to be danced along to".

== Music video ==
The music video was directed by Emil Nava and released on 11 June 2021. It was described by Jason Heffler of EDM.com as "kaleidoscopic" and a "bubbly audiovisual project that ties in perfectly with the sun-kissed tune".

== Charts ==
=== Weekly charts ===
Weekly chart performance for "By Your Side"
Chart (2021–2024)	Peak position
Argentina Hot 100 (Billboard)	85
Belgium (Ultratop 50 Flanders)	23
Belgium (Ultratop 50 Wallonia)	19
Canada Hot 100 (Billboard)	65
CIS Airplay (TopHit)	16
Czech Republic Singles Digital (ČNS IFPI)	63
Estonia Airplay (TopHit)	113
France (SNEP)	90
Germany (GfK)	75
Global 200 (Billboard)	70
Hungary (Dance Top 40)	7
Hungary (Rádiós Top 40)	1
Hungary (Single Top 40)	16
Ireland (IRMA)	8
Lithuania (AGATA)	72
Mexico Airplay (Billboard)	29
Netherlands (Dutch Top 40)	8
Netherlands (Single Top 100)	24
New Zealand Hot Singles (RMNZ)	5
Panama International (PRODUCE)	43
Portugal (AFP)	181
Russia Airplay (TopHit)	21
San Marino Airplay (SMRTV Top 50)	21
Slovakia Airplay (ČNS IFPI)	80
Slovakia Singles Digital (ČNS IFPI)	57
Sweden (Sverigetopplistan)	42
Switzerland (Schweizer Hitparade)	73
Ukraine Airplay (TopHit)	107
UK Singles (Official Charts)	9
UK Dance (Official Charts)	2
US Bubbling Under Hot 100 (Billboard)	24
US Hot Dance/Electronic Songs (Billboard)	6

2026 weekly chart performance
Chart (2026)	Peak position
Kazakhstan Airplay (TopHit)	93

=== Monthly charts ===
Monthly chart performance for "By Your Side"
Chart (2021)	Peak position
CIS Airplay (TopHit)	24
Czech Republic (Singles Digitál Top 100)	69
Russia Airplay (TopHit)	27
Slovakia (Singles Digitál Top 100)	71

=== Year-end charts ===
2021 year-end chart performance for "By Your Side"
Chart (2021)	Position
Belgium (Ultratop Flanders)	72
Belgium (Ultratop Wallonia)	84
CIS Airplay (TopHit)	94
Hungary (Dance Top 40)	45
Hungary (Rádiós Top 40)	11
Netherlands (Airplay Top 50)	50
Netherlands (Dutch Top 40)	45
Russia Airplay (TopHit)	118
UK Singles (OCC)	64
US Hot Dance/Electronic Songs (Billboard)	21

2022 year-end chart performance for "By Your Side"
Chart (2022)	Position
Belgium (Ultratop 50 Flanders)	188
Hungary (Dance Top 40)	47
Hungary (Rádiós Top 40)	81

2023 year-end chart performance for "By Your Side"
Chart (2023)	Position
Hungary (Dance Top 40)	99

2024 year-end chart performance for "By Your Side"
Chart (2024)	Position
Hungary (Dance Top 40)	85

2025 year-end chart performance for "By Your Side"
Chart (2025)	Position
Hungary (Dance Top 40)	89

== Certifications ==
Certifications for "By Your Side"
Region	Certification	Certified units/sales
Australia (ARIA)	Gold	35,000^{‡}
Austria (IFPI Austria)	Gold	15,000^{‡}
Belgium (BRMA)	Gold	20,000^{‡}
Canada (Music Canada)	Gold	40,000^{‡}
France (SNEP)	Gold	100,000^{‡}
Italy (FIMI)	Gold	50,000^{‡}
Netherlands (NVPI)	Gold	40,000^{‡}
New Zealand (RMNZ)	Gold	15,000^{‡}
Spain (Promusicae)	Gold	30,000^{‡}
United Kingdom (BPI)	Platinum	600,000^{‡}
^{‡} Sales+streaming figures based on certification alone.

== Release history ==
Release dates and formats for "By Your Side"
Region	Date	Format	Label	Ref.
Various	4 June 2021	Digital download; streaming	Sony	
United Kingdom	4 June 2021	Contemporary hit radio	Sony	
Italy	4 June 2021	Contemporary hit radio	Sony	
