= Only the Poets =

British band

- Origin: Reading, England
- Genres: Pop rock; pop; Britpop; indie pop; indie rock
- Years active: 2017–present
- Label: Virgin EMI
- Members: Tommy Longhurst; Andrew "Andy/Roo" Burge; Clem Cherry; Marcus Yates
- Past members: Jarred Philips
- Website: onlythepoetsofficial.com

Only the Poets are an English band from Reading, formed in 2017 and currently consisting of members Tommy Longhurst, Andrew "Andy/Roo" Burge, Clem Cherry, and Marcus Yates.

== Members ==
Lead vocalist and guitarist Tommy Longhurst, from Woodley, was a solo artist prior to Only the Poets, and became inspired by bands he saw at Reading and Leeds Festivals to start a band of his own. Andrew "Andy/Roo" Burge was a bassist for another band whom Longhurst linked up with upon its dissolution.

Longhurst and Burge worked with multiple guitarists and drummers until finding Marcus Yates and Jarred Philips of the band Pixel Fix through their mutual manager Sam Jackson. Philips later left, and his role was taken over by Clem Cherry, another former Pixel Fix member.

== Career ==
Only the Poets released their debut single titled "Ceasefire" on 20 February 2017, followed by further singles such as "Emotional", "Dead Young", and "Stolen Bikes". They had their first live gigs as a band in 2018. They also supported Coasts. In 2021, Only the Poets released their debut EP Speak Out, through which they promoted mental health awareness.

Only the Poets supported singer-songwriter Louis Tomlinson on the UK and Europe leg of his self-titled world tour in 2022, a position they had secured in 2020, before embarking on their own headline tour that summer and autumn. They made a point of making tickets affordable for lower income individuals. They also released their second EP Our Time.

Only the Poets continued their Feels Like Home headline tour the next year, opening for Lewis Capaldi and Bastille, and performing at festivals such as Lollapalooza Paris and Reading Festival. Also in 2023, Only the Poets signed with Virgin EMI Records. Their first single with EMI was "Even Hell", which Longhurst described as "our love letter to music". Only the Poets promoted the next single "Jump!" with a surprise gig.

== Artistry ==
In 2020, Longhurst stated Only the Poets were sonically inspired by British bands like Blur, Oasis, and The Cure. Their music has drawn comparisons to Villagers, The Script, The 1975, Bruce Springsteen, and Sam Fender.

== Discography ==
=== Studio albums ===
Title	Details	Peak chart positions					
Title	Details	UK	AUT	BEL (FL)	GER	NLD	SCO
And I'd Do It Again	Released: 30 January 2026; Label: Capitol	9	15	4	6	19	20

=== Live albums ===
Title	Details	Peak chart positions		
Title	Details	BEL (FL)	GER	NLD
Live on the Feels Like Home Tour	Released: 20 October 2023; Label: EMI; Format: LP	6	91	35

=== Demo albums ===
- Demos (2021)

=== Extended plays ===
Title	Details	Peak chart positions					
Title	Details	UK	AUT	BEL (FL)	GER	NLD	SCO
Speak Out	Released: 2020	—	—	—	—	—	—
Our Time	Released: 14 October 2022; Label: My Mates Only	—	—	—	—	—	22
2023	Released: 15 December 2023; Label: EMI	—	—	—	—	—	—
One More Night	Released: 31 May 2024; Label: EMI	48	4	3	18	4	18
Better on the Internet	Released: 8 August 2024; Label: EMI	—	—	—	—	—	—

=== Singles ===
- "Ceasefire" (2017)
- "Emotional" (2017)
- "Dead Young" (2018)
- "Even hell" (2018)
- "Looking at you" (2019)
- "Stolen Bikes" (2019)
- "You Can Do Magic" (2019)
- "Waking in the Dark" (2020)
- "No More Lonely" (2021)
- "Every Song I Ever Wrote" (2022)
- "Forget Your Name" (2022)
- "Hold Me" (2022)
- "Nana's House" (2022)
- "Even Hell" (2023)
- "Jump!" (2023)
- "Crash" (2023)
- "Over & Over" (2023)
- "Looking at You" (2023)
- "Every God I Pray To" (2023)
- "One More Night" (2024)
- "Gone by Now" (2024)
- "I Don't Wanna Be Your Friend" (2024)
- "All This Time" (2024)
- "Mindset" (2024)
- "Miserable" (2024)
- "Everything You Know" (2024)
- "Indigo" (2024)
- "Already There" (2024)
- "I Keep On Messing It Up" (2025)
- “You Hate That I'm in Love” (2025)
- "Emotionally Hungover" (2025)
- "Guess She's Cool" (2025)
- "Saké" (2025)
- "Thinking Bout Your Ex" (2025)
