= Teardrops (Liam Payne song) =

Single by Liam Payne
- Released: 1 March 2024
- Genre: Pop; R&B
- Length: 2:54
- Label: Capitol; Hampton
- Songwriters: Liam Payne; JC Chasez; Jamie Scott
- Producers: Martin Hannah; Daniel Bryer; Jamie Scott

Liam Payne singles chronology
"Sunshine" (2021)	"Teardrops" (2024)

Lyric video
- "Teardrops" on YouTube

"Teardrops" is a song by English singer Liam Payne, released on 1 March 2024, via Capitol and Hampton Records. It was released as the lead single from a then-planned second studio album. The song was written by Payne, JC Chasez, and Jamie Scott. It was Payne's first single in three years since "Sunshine", released in 2021, and the final released by him during his lifetime before he died that October.

== Background ==
On 3 February 2024, Payne announced via social media that he would be releasing his new single "Teardrops", on 1 March. In his newsletter, Payne wrote that it is, "a song that is born from many tears. Some are mine. Others are not." He also stated that the track is about "the vulnerability of heartbreak and the challenge of overcoming those moments." A lyric video for "Teardrops" premiered via YouTube on 1 March 2024.

== Composition ==
"Teardrops" was written by Liam Payne, JC Chasez and Jamie Scott, while production was handled by Martin Hannah, Daniel Bryer and Scott. The song has been described as late-90s sounding, blending rhythmic pop and R&B with a twinkling guitar on its "booming pop production." Co-writer Jamie Scott described writing the track as a "year long process of self-reflection."

== Critical reception ==
Professional ratings
Review scores
Source	Rating
Clash	8/10

A positive review came from Hannah Sinclair of Clash. She praised Payne's vocals, as well as the catchy lyrics that "resonate with listeners going through similar emotions and pain." She also felt that the track had "more intimate feeling" compared to previous tracks from his first album. She ended the review stating, "The single shows a subtle change in direction which will speak to people far beyond his original fanbase. Polished and defined, Liam Payne is truly developing his solo voice, while maturing as a songwriter." However, Sydney Brasil of Exclaim! gave a negative review calling the track bland and how it "sounds exactly like a song from an ex-boyband member. She also added, "The Justin Timberlake-goes-R&B safety net is always waiting for you after you sacrifice your teen years to late capitalism."

== Chart performance ==
Following the release of the single, "Teardrops" debuted 44 on the UK Singles Downloads Chart. After Payne's death, in October 2024, "Teardrops" reached a new peak of number 3 on the same chart. On 25 October 2024, the single debuted at number 85 on the main UK Singles Chart.

== Track listing ==
Digital download
No.	Title	Length
1.	"Teardrops"	2:54

Digital download – acoustic
No.	Title	Length
1.	"Teardrops" (acoustic)	3:06

7" vinyl
No.	Title	Length
1.	"Teardrops"	2:54
2.	"Teardrops" (acoustic)	3:06

== Personnel ==
Musicians

- Liam Payne – vocals

Additional musicians

- JC Chasez – backing vocals
- Jamie Scott – backing vocals, keyboards, percussion
- Daniel Bryer – backing vocals, keyboards, percussion
- Martin Hannah – guitar

Production

- Martin Hannah – producer, programming, recording engineer
- Jamie Scott – producer, programming
- Daniel Bryer – producer, programming
- Jonny Coffer – programming
- Cameron Gower Poole – vocal producer, recording engineer
- Trey Station – assistant mixing engineer
- Anthony Vilchis – assistant mixing engineer
- Zach Pereyra – mastering, assistant mixing engineer
- Manny Marroquin – mixing

== Charts ==
Chart performance for "Teardrops"
Chart (2024)	Peak position
New Zealand Hot Singles (RMNZ)	31
UK Singles (Official Charts)	85

== Release history ==
"Teardrops" release history
Region	Date	Format(s)	Label(s)	Ref.
Various	1 March 2024	Digital download; streaming	Capitol; Hampton	
Italy	1 March 2024	Radio airplay	Universal	
Various	28 March 2024	Digital download; streaming; (Acoustic)	Capitol; Hampton	
United Kingdom	24 May 2024	Vinyl	EMI	
