= What a Feeling (One Direction song) =

Promotional single by One Direction

from the album Made in the A.M.
- Released: 11 November 2015
- Recorded: 2015
- Genre: Alternative rock
- Length: 3:21
- Label: Syco
- Songwriters: Liam Payne; Louis Tomlinson; Daniel Bryer; Mike Needle; Jamie Scott
- Producer: Jamie Scott

"What a Feeling" is a song recorded by English-Irish boy band One Direction for their fifth studio album, Made in the A.M. (2015). The song was released as the album's second promotional single on iTunes Store and Spotify on 11 November 2015.

== Background ==
Tomlinson stated that "What a Feeling" is "one of the songs that just does give you kind of a completely different flavor to maybe what you're used to... the whole feel of the song is 'feel good'." Payne also added that it was one of his favorites from Made in the A.M. He later told the fans on an Instagram live video that the song was made to be played in a stadium.

Fans of the band held a so-called streaming party on October 25, 2020, where they all listened to the track during the whole day. The goal was to get the song on the top 100 charts. Thanks to it, the song got over 50 million streams on that day alone.

== Composition ==
It was written and produced by Jamie Scott and co-written by band members Liam Payne and Louis Tomlinson along with Daniel Bryer and Mike Needle. According to Tomlinson, the track has a "Fleetwood Mac influence." The song has been described as funk and upbeat.

== Reception ==
While writing for Billboard, Erin Strecker described the song as having "a sweetly thumping bass line and light harmonies," and added, "the tune would feel perfectly at home in the easy, breezy '70s." Hardeep Phull of New York Post stated that the track "blends Fleetwood Mac-style harmonies with a silky smooth, '80s pop sheen." Maggie Malach of Bustle felt that the lyrics were "all over the place, but it's still all sorts of fantastic." She also added, "the hazy vibe of the song more than makes up for it." In Rolling Stone's special Reader's Poll, "What a Feeling" topped #1 as one of the best songs One Direction ever released.

== Charts ==
Chart performance for "What a Feeling"
Chart (2015)	Peak position
Australia (ARIA)	77
Austria (Ö3 Austria Top 40)	73
France (SNEP)	150
Hungary (Single Top 40)	27
Hungary (Stream Top 40)	35
Ireland (IRMA)	59
Italy (FIMI)	46
Netherlands (Single Top 100)	94
Sweden (Sverigetopplistan)	74
UK Singles (Official Charts)	90
US Bubbling Under Hot 100 (Billboard)	9

== Certifications ==
Certifications for "What a Feeling"
Region	Certification	Certified units/sales
New Zealand (RMNZ)	Gold	15,000^{‡}
^{‡} Sales+streaming figures based on certification alone.
