= Brit Award for International Song =

British music award

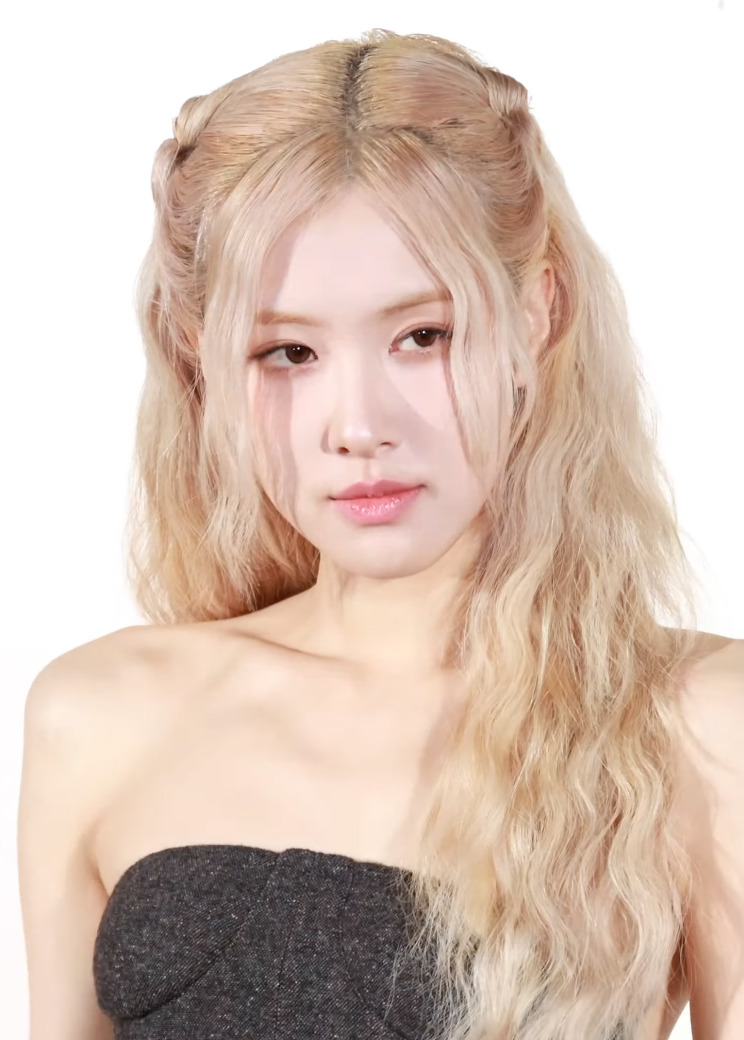
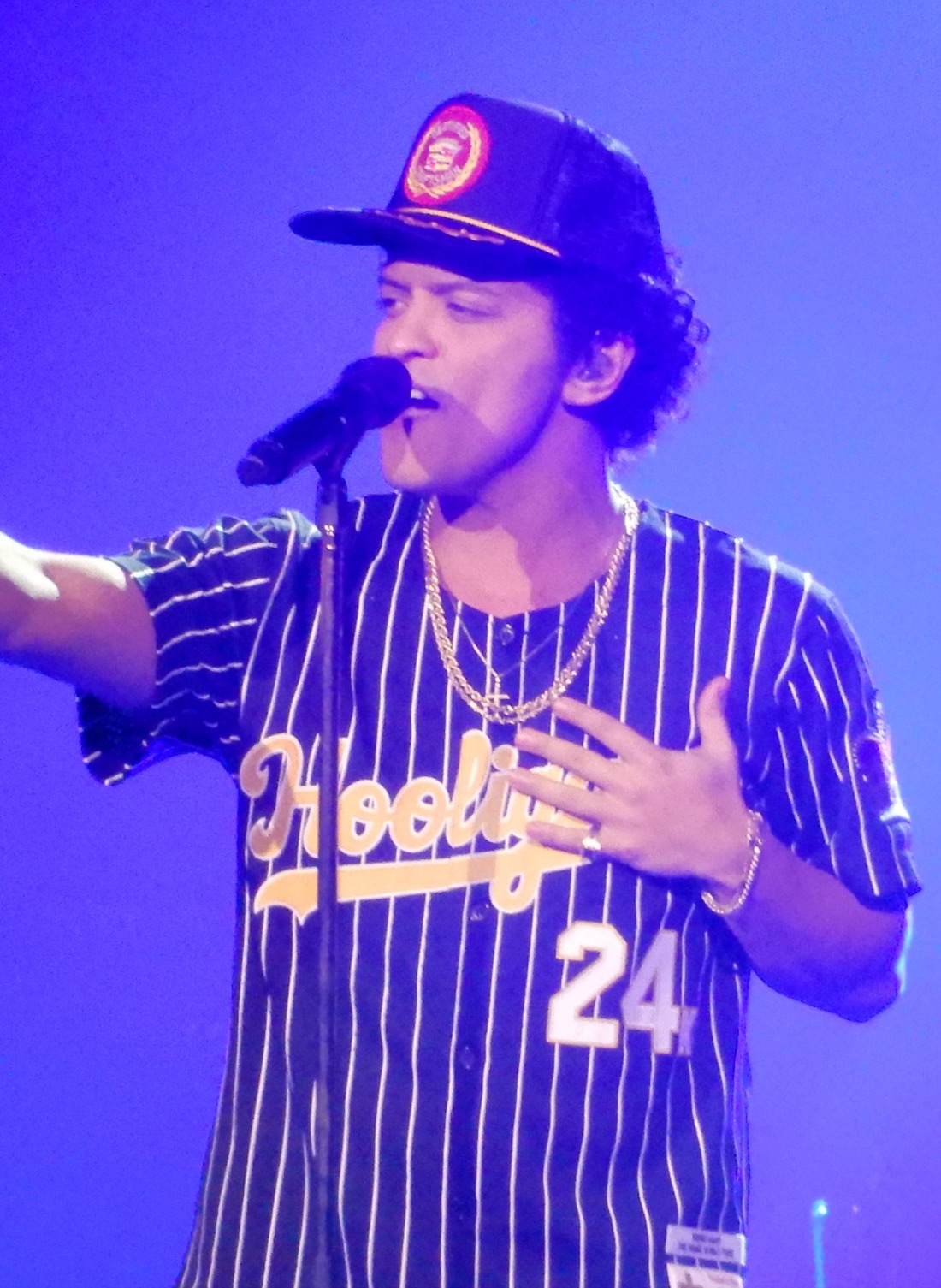
- 2026 winners Rosé and Bruno Mars
- Country: United Kingdom (UK)
- Presented by: British Phonographic Industry (BPI)
- First award: 2022
- Currently held by: Rosé and Bruno Mars – "APT." (2026)

Highlights
- Most nominations: Billie Eilish; Taylor Swift; (3 each)
- Website: www.brits.co.uk

The Brit Award for International Song is an award given by the British Phonographic Industry (BPI), an organisation which represents record companies and artists in the United Kingdom. The accolade is presented at the Brit Awards, an annual celebration of British and international music. The winners and nominees are determined by the Brit Awards voting academy with over one thousand members, which comprise record labels, publishers, managers, agents, media, and previous winners and nominees.

The inaugural winner of the category was Olivia Rodrigo with "Good 4 U", a single from her debut album Sour. In 2023 Beyoncé became the first artist to win in two categories for international acts at the same award ceremony, winning for International Artist and International Song with "Break My Soul". The current recipients of the award are New Zealand-South Korean singer Rosé and Bruno Mars for their song "APT.", becoming, respectively, the first non-American winner and the first male artist to win.

Billie Eilish and Taylor Swift hold the record for most nominations in the category, with three. Noah Kahan's "Stick Season" is the first song to be nominated in consecutive years. French producer David Guetta is the only non-American artist with multiple nominations.

== History ==
The category was introduced in 2022 following a restructuring which resulted in the removal of gendered categories. It is the first award to recognise individual songs by international artists and only the second category, following the Brit Award for International Album (1977, 2002-2011), to honor the work of international artists rather than the artists themselves.

== Winners and nominees ==
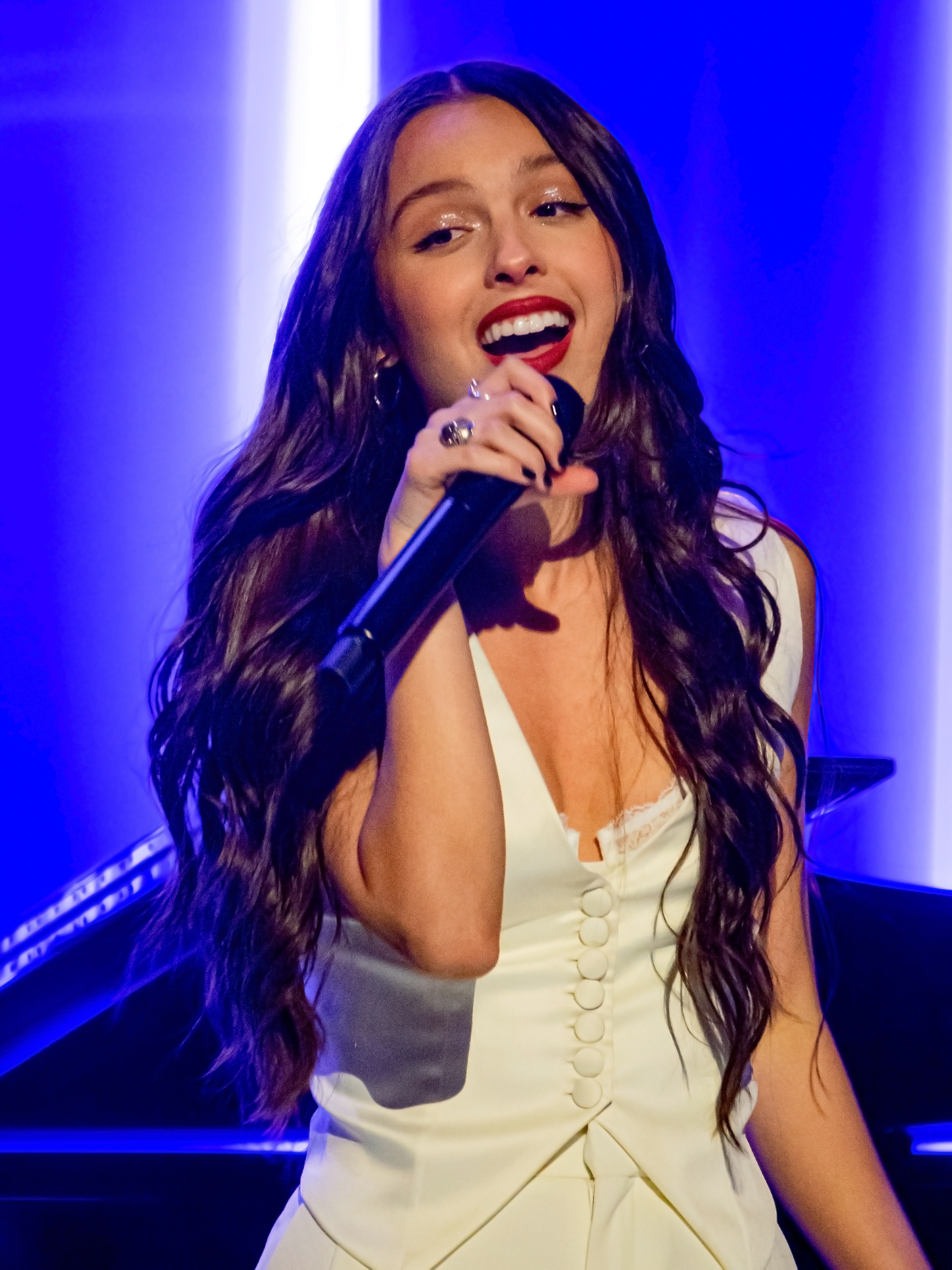
Inaugural winner Olivia Rodrigo

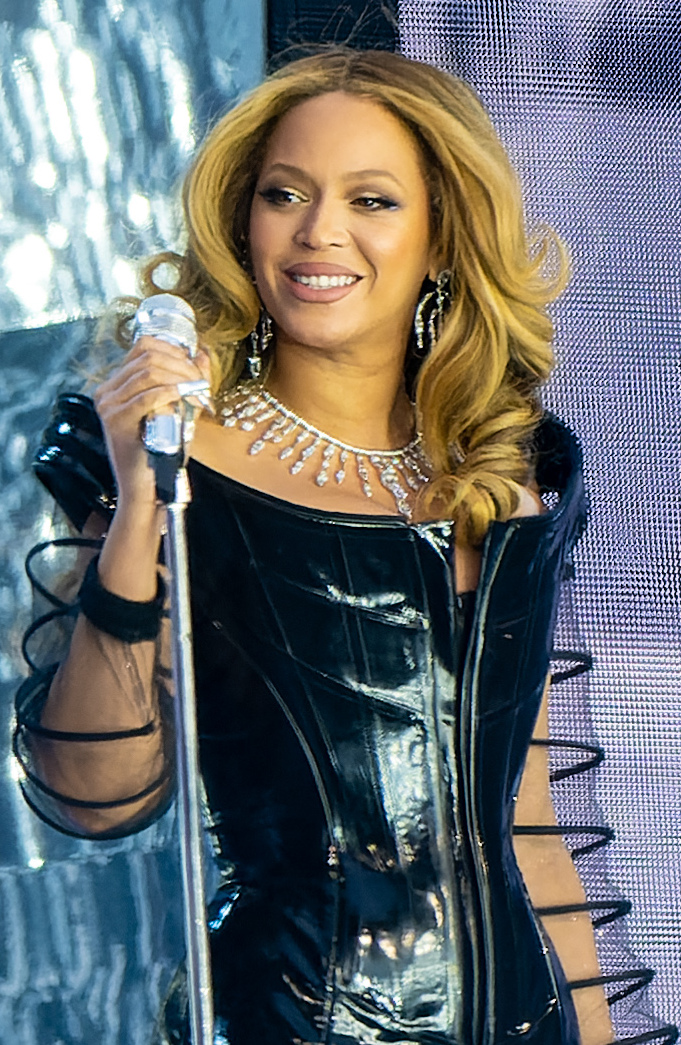
Beyoncé won both International Song and International Artist at the 2023 ceremony

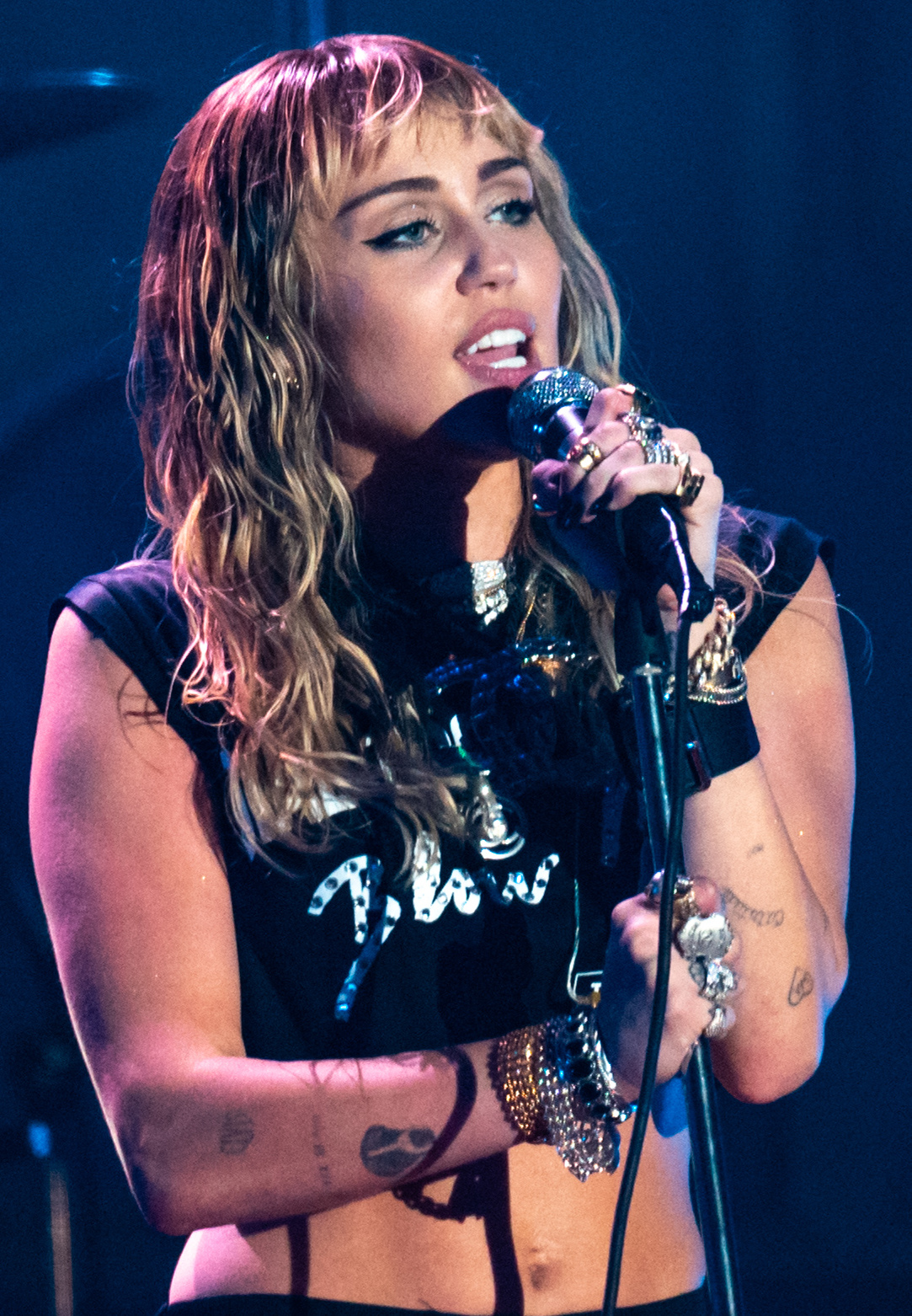
2024 winner Miley Cyrus

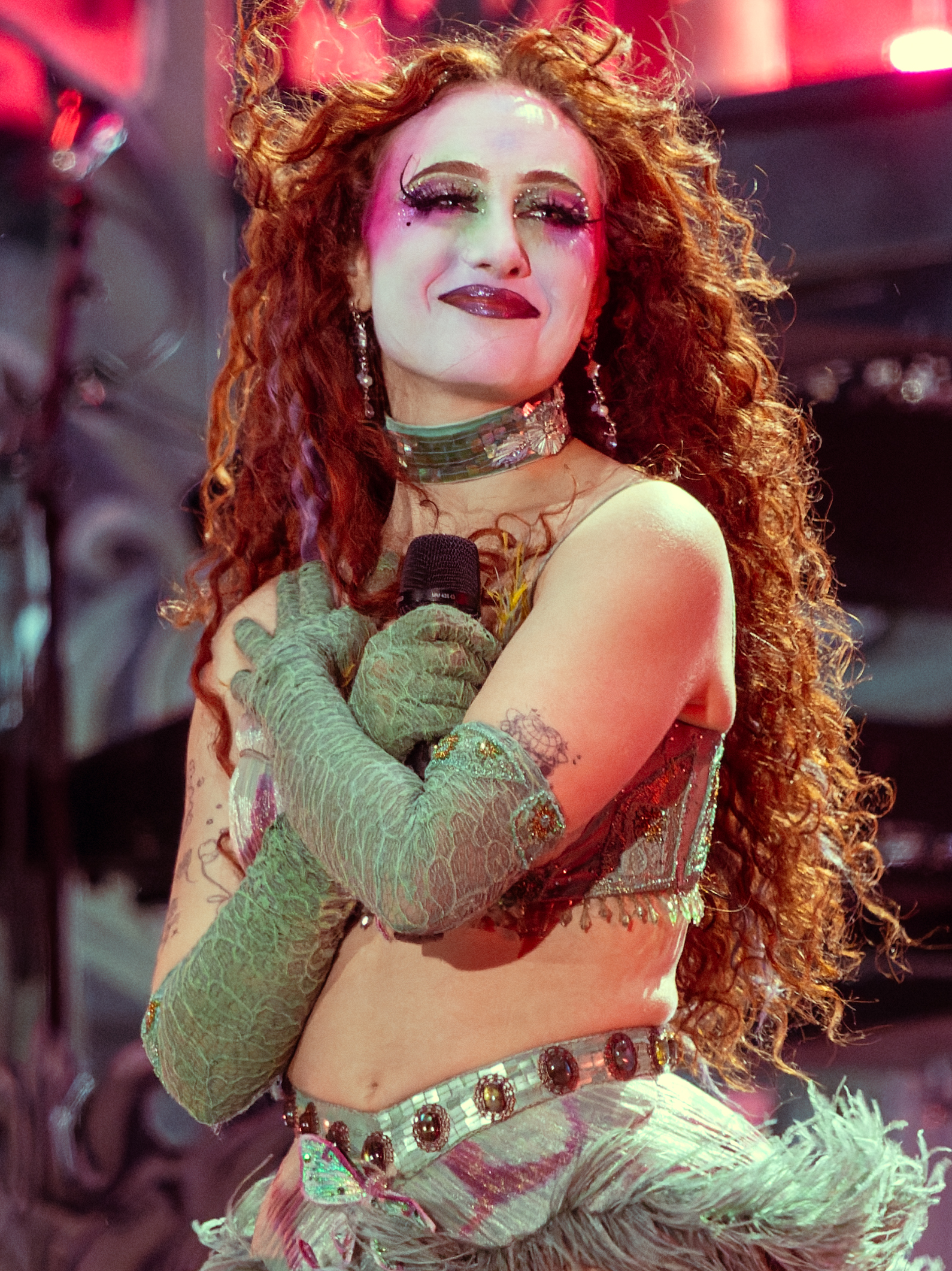
Chappell Roan won both International Song and International Artist at the 2025 ceremony

Year	Song	Artist(s)
2022 (42nd)
2022 (42nd)	"Good 4 U"	(United States) Olivia Rodrigo
2022 (42nd)	"Black Magic"	(Germany) Jonasu
2022 (42nd)	"Calling My Phone"	(United States) Lil Tjay & 6lack
2022 (42nd)	"Girls Want Girls"	(Canada) Drake featuring (United States) Lil Baby
2022 (42nd)	"Happier Than Ever"	(United States) Billie Eilish
2022 (42nd)	"Heartbreak Anthem"	(Sweden) Galantis, (France) David Guetta & (United Kingdom) Little Mix
2022 (42nd)	"I Wanna Be Your Slave"	(Italy) Måneskin
2022 (42nd)	"Kiss Me More"	(United States) Doja Cat featuring SZA
2022 (42nd)	"Love Nwantiti Remix (Ah Ah Ah)"	(Nigeria) CKay featuring (Nigeria) Joeboy and (Ghana) Kuami Eugene
2022 (42nd)	"Montero (Call Me by Your Name)"	(United States) Lil Nas X
2022 (42nd)	"Rapstar"	(United States) Polo G
2022 (42nd)	"Save Your Tears"	(Canada) The Weeknd
2022 (42nd)	"Stay"	(Australia) The Kid Laroi & (Canada) Justin Bieber
2022 (42nd)	"The Business"	(Netherlands) Tiësto
2022 (42nd)	"Your Love (9pm)"	(Germany) ATB, (Germany) Topic & (Sweden) A7S
2023 (43rd)
2023 (43rd)	"Break My Soul"	(United States) Beyoncé
2023 (43rd)	"I'm Good (Blue)"	(France) David Guetta & (United States) Bebe Rexha
2023 (43rd)	"Peru"	(Nigeria) Fireboy DML & (United Kingdom) Ed Sheeran
2023 (43rd)	"We Don't Talk About Bruno"	(Colombia) Carolina Gaitán, (Colombia) Mauro Castillo, (United States) Adassa, (United States) Rhenzy Feliz, (United States) Diane Guerrero & (United States) Stephanie Beatriz
2023 (43rd)	"First Class"	(United States) Jack Harlow
2023 (43rd)	"About Damn Time"	(United States) Lizzo
2023 (43rd)	"Where Are You Now"	(Belgium) Lost Frequencies & (United Kingdom) Calum Scott
2023 (43rd)	"I Ain't Worried"	(United States) OneRepublic
2023 (43rd)	"Anti-Hero"	(United States) Taylor Swift
2024 (44th)
2024 (44th)	"Flowers"	(United States) Miley Cyrus
2024 (44th)	"What Was I Made For?"	(United States) Billie Eilish
2024 (44th)	"Daylight"	(United States) David Kushner
2024 (44th)	"Paint the Town Red"	(United States) Doja Cat
2024 (44th)	"Giving Me"	(Republic of Ireland) Jazzy
2024 (44th)	"People"	(Cameroon) / (United States) Libianca
2024 (44th)	"Made You Look"	(United States) Meghan Trainor
2024 (44th)	"Stick Season"	(United States) Noah Kahan
2024 (44th)	"Miss You"	(United States) Oliver Tree & (Germany) Robin Schulz
2024 (44th)	"Vampire"	(United States) Olivia Rodrigo
2024 (44th)	"(It Goes Like) Nanana"	(South Korea) Peggy Gou
2024 (44th)	"Calm Down"	(Nigeria) Rema
2024 (44th)	"Kill Bill"	(United States) SZA
2024 (44th)	"Greedy"	(Canada) Tate McRae
2024 (44th)	"Water"	(South Africa) Tyla
2025 (45th)
2025 (45th)	"Good Luck, Babe!"	(United States) Chappell Roan
2025 (45th)	"Beautiful Things"	(United States) Benson Boone
2025 (45th)	"Texas Hold 'Em"	(United States) Beyoncé
2025 (45th)	"Birds of a Feather"	(United States) Billie Eilish
2025 (45th)	"End of Beginning"	(United States) Djo
2025 (45th)	"Houdini"	(United States) Eminem
2025 (45th)	"Too Sweet"	(Republic of Ireland) Hozier
2025 (45th)	"Lovin on Me"	(United States) Jack Harlow
2025 (45th)	"Stick Season"	(United States) Noah Kahan
2025 (45th)	"I Had Some Help"	(United States) Post Malone featuring Morgan Wallen
2025 (45th)	"Espresso"	(United States) Sabrina Carpenter
2025 (45th)	"A Bar Song (Tipsy)"	(United States) Shaboozey
2025 (45th)	"Fortnight"	(United States) Taylor Swift featuring Post Malone
2025 (45th)	"Lose Control"	(United States) Teddy Swims
2025 (45th)	"Million Dollar Baby"	(United States) Tommy Richman
2026 (46th)
2026 (46th)	"APT."	(New Zealand) / (South Korea) Rosé & (United States) Bruno Mars
2026 (46th)	"Ordinary"	(United States) Alex Warren
2026 (46th)	"Pink Pony Club"	(United States) Chappell Roan
2026 (46th)	"No Broke Boys"	(United States) Disco Lines & Tinashe
2026 (46th)	"Sailor Song"	(United States) Gigi Perez
2026 (46th)	"That's So True"	(United States) Gracie Abrams
2026 (46th)	"Golden"	(United States) / (South Korea) Huntrix: Ejae, Audrey Nuna & Rei Ami
2026 (46th)	"Die with a Smile"	(United States) Lady Gaga & Bruno Mars
2026 (46th)	"Love Me Not"	(United States) Ravyn Lenae
2026 (46th)	"Manchild"	(United States) Sabrina Carpenter
2026 (46th)	"Undressed"	(United States) Sombr
2026 (46th)	"The Fate of Ophelia"	(United States) Taylor Swift

== Artists with multiple nominations ==
3 nominations

- Billie Eilish
- Taylor Swift

2 nominations

- Beyoncé
- Bruno Mars
- Chappell Roan
- David Guetta
- Doja Cat
- Jack Harlow
- Noah Kahan
- Olivia Rodrigo
- Post Malone
- Sabrina Carpenter
- SZA

== Countries by nominations ==
Countries by nominations
Country	Nominations	First nomination	Latest nomination	Artist/s
United States	57	2022	2026	Majority of nominees
Canada	4	2022	2024	Drake, The Weeknd, Justin Bieber, Tate McRae
Germany	3	2022	2024	Jonasu, ATB, Topic, Robin Schulz
Nigeria	3	2022	2024	CKay, Joeboy, Fireboy DML, Rema
United Kingdom (as co-lead artist)	3	2022	2023	Little Mix, Ed Sheeran, Calum Scott
South Korea	3	2024	2026	Peggy Gou, Rosé, Huntrix
France	2	2022	2023	David Guetta
Ireland	2	2024	2025	Jazzy, Hozier
Sweden	2	2022		Galantis, A7S
Australia	1	2022		The Kid Laroi
Belgium	1	2023		Lost Frequencies
Cameroon	1	2024		Libianca
Colombia	1	2023		Carolina Gaitán, Mauro Castillo
Ghana	1	2022		Kuami Eugene
Italy	1	2022		Måneskin
Netherlands	1	2022		Tiësto
South Africa	1	2024		Tyla
New Zealand	1	2026		Rosé

== See also ==
- Brit Award for British Single
