= Feel Again (album) =

2023 studio album by Armin van Buuren

Studio album by Armin van Buuren
- Released: 31 March 2023
- Genre: Progressive house; house; trance; dance-pop; hands up
- Length: 1:45:55
- Label: Armada Music

Armin van Buuren chronology
Balance (2019)	Feel Again (2023)	Breathe (2025)

Singles from Feel Again
- 1. "No Fun" Released: 19 November 2021; 2. "Love We Lost" Released: 11 March 2022; 3. "Come Around Again" Released: 8 April 2022; 4. "Feel Again" Released: 27 May 2022; 5. "One More Time" Released: 15 July 2022; 6. "Easy to Love" Released: 6 January 2023; 7. "On & On" Released: 31 March 2023

Feel Again is the eighth studio album by Dutch DJ and record producer Armin van Buuren. It was released on 31 March 2023 by Armada Music. The album contains 34 tracks across three discs and includes collaborations with artists such as R3hab, Owl City, Matoma, Teddy Swims, Gareth Emery, JC Stewart, Cosmic Gate and Diane Warren.

The album was issued as a three-part project. Feel Again, Part 1 and Feel Again, Part 2 were released in 2022, while the full album, including the third part, was released in 2023. Commercially, Feel Again reached number 17 in the Netherlands, number 81 in Belgium and number 77 in Germany.

== Background and release ==
The album trilogy was announced in 2022, shortly before van Buuren's This Is Me – Feel Again shows at the Ziggo Dome in Amsterdam. Armada Music described the project as focusing on "re-establishing the connection to and between friends, family and fans". The first part, Feel Again, Part 1, was released in June 2022 and included previously released tracks such as "Come Around Again", "Offshore" and the title track "Feel Again".

Feel Again, Part 2 was released on 21 October 2022. Van Buuren's official website described the second part as an installment centred on reconnecting with festival crowds and listed singles and collaborations including "One More Time", "Forever & Always", "Live on Love" and "Computers Take Over the World".

The complete album was released on 31 March 2023. According to Armada Music, the album was created after van Buuren experienced disconnection from family, friends and fans during the COVID-19 pandemic, and was intended to reflect three stages of feeling and inspiration. The release was led by "On & On", a collaboration with British duo Punctual and London-based singer Alika.

== Singles ==
"No Fun", a collaboration with the Stickmen Project, was released on 19 November 2021. "Love We Lost", a collaboration with R3hab featuring Simon Ward, followed on 11 March 2022. "Come Around Again", with Billen Ted and featuring JC Stewart, was released on 8 April 2022.

The title track "Feel Again", featuring Wrabel, was released on 27 May 2022 and served as the theme song for van Buuren's This Is Me – Feel Again shows. "One More Time", featuring Maia Wright, was released on 15 July 2022. "Easy to Love", a collaboration with Matoma featuring Teddy Swims, was released on 6 January 2023. "On & On", with Punctual featuring Alika, was released on 31 March 2023 as the lead single for the full album release.

== Critical reception ==
Feel Again received mixed-to-positive coverage from dance music publications. Jake Appelman of EDM Identity wrote that the final part of the album demonstrated van Buuren's artistic versatility, highlighting its range of collaborators and singling out "Easy to Love" and "On & On" as standouts.

Ryan Ford of We Rave You described Feel Again as an accomplished completion of the album trilogy and wrote that the 34-track album delivered a wide range of material, reflecting van Buuren's years of production experience. Mark Mancino of DJ Life Magazine was also positive, calling the album more elaborate and complex than van Buuren's previous album Balance and writing that it showcased trance, commercial dance and several house styles across its 34 tracks.

Q. Preston of Music Matters Media gave the album two out of five stars, praising van Buuren's strengths in emotionally progressive tracks such as "Offshore" and "No Fun" but criticising the album's length and lack of cohesion.

== Track listing ==
Track titles and lengths are adapted from Apple Music.

Disc 1 – Feel Again, Pt. 1
No.	Title	Length
1.	"Feel Again" (featuring Wrabel)	7:38
2.	"Oumuamua"	5:25
3.	"No Fun" (with the Stickmen Project)	2:10
4.	"Human Touch" (with Sam Gray)	2:25
5.	"Come Around Again" (with Billen Ted featuring JC Stewart)	2:49
6.	"Let You Down"	3:30
7.	"Start Again" (featuring Jesse Fink)	2:47
8.	"Pas de Bourree" (featuring Lucky Lou)	2:21
9.	"Love We Lost" (with R3hab featuring Simon Ward)	2:16
10.	"Offshore" (with AVIRA vs. Chicane)	3:19
Total length:		34:40

Disc 2 – Feel Again, Pt. 2
No.	Title	Length
1.	"One More Time" (featuring Maia Wright)	2:28
2.	"Superman" (with Blasterjaxx featuring 24h)	3:24
3.	"Forever & Always" (with Gareth Emery featuring Owl City)	3:14
4.	"Roll the Dice" (featuring Philip Strand)	2:35
5.	"I'm Sorry" (featuring Scott Abbot)	3:10
6.	"Computers Take Over the World"	2:32
7.	"Clap"	2:30
8.	"Hey (I Miss You)" (featuring Simon Ward)	3:19
9.	"Something Beautiful"	2:34
10.	"Live on Love" (with Diane Warren featuring My Marianne)	2:51
11.	"Shot at Love" (featuring Husky)	3:22
Total length:		31:59

Disc 3 – Feel Again, Pt. 3
No.	Title	Length
1.	"Tocando el Sol" (with Azteck)	2:44
2.	"Typically Dutch" (with Wildstylez featuring PollyAnna)	2:26
3.	"Easy to Love" (with Matoma featuring Teddy Swims)	2:31
4.	"Dayglow" (featuring Stuart Crichton)	3:19
5.	"La Bomba" (with Blasterjaxx)	2:59
6.	"Do Right" (featuring ZOI)	3:12
7.	"On & On" (with Punctual featuring Alika)	2:50
8.	"Vulnerable" (featuring Vanessa Campagna)	3:19
9.	"Letting Go" (featuring Matluck)	2:26
10.	"Reflexion (ASOT 2023 Anthem)" (with Cosmic Gate)	2:39
11.	"State of Mind" (featuring Alba)	3:05
12.	"Rhythm Inside" (with Ahmed Helmy)	3:14
13.	"Feel Again" (reprise; featuring Wrabel)	4:32
Total length:		39:16

== Charts ==
Chart (2023)	Peak position
Belgian Albums (Ultratop Flanders)	81
Dutch Albums (Album Top 100)	17
German Albums (Offizielle Top 100)	77

== Release history ==
Region	Date	Format	Label	Ref.
Various	31 March 2023	Digital download, streaming, 3×CD	Armada Music	
