= Come Around Again =

Single by Armin van Buuren and Billen Ted featuring JC Stewart

from the album Feel Again
- Released: 8 April 2022
- Genre: Dance-pop; electropop (Note: Radio edit); progressive trance (Note: Club remix)
- Length: 2:49; 6:04
- Label: Armada
- Songwriters: Armin van Buuren; Benno de Goeij; John Callum Stewart; Tom Hollings; Sam Brennan; James Newman; Nick Sheldon
- Producers: van Buuren; de Goeij; Hollings; Brennan

Armin van Buuren singles chronology
"Leave a Little Love" (2021)	"Come Around Again" (2022)	"On & On" (2023)

Billen Ted singles chronology
"24/7" (2022)	"Come Around Again" (2022)	"Step Correct" (2022)

JC Stewart singles chronology
"Love Like That" (2022)	"Come Around Again" (2022)	"Scars" (2022)

Music video
- "Come Around Again" on YouTube

"Come Around Again" is a song by Dutch DJ Armin van Buuren and British DJ duo Billen Ted, featuring British singer-songwriter JC Stewart, released on 8 April 2022 as the third single from the former's eighth studio album, Feel Again (2023). A club mix and a remix from Starpicker were also released on 10 June 2022 and 22 December 2023, respectively.

== Background and release ==
The song was premiered at the Miami leg of Ultra Music Festival in 2022, accompanied by its respective club mix. Armin van Buuren declared about the song: "What I like so much about "Come Around Again" is that it has a little bit of everything. It has the drive it needs to energize dance floors and also has the lyrical depth and poppy hook to make due on radio and in playlists. I'm super happy with this collab and loved working with Billen Ted and JC Stewart. They really inspired me in the studio!" Billen Ted said: "We loved working on "Come Around Again" with Armin and JC. We premiered it at Ultra and it went off, so we're looking forward to having it out in the world." JC Stewart added: "From writing it in a beautiful house in Cornwall to debuting it on the Ultra Miami main stage, working with Armin and Billen Ted on "Come Around Again" has already been a dream come true. I can't wait to see people dancing to it all summer!"

== Music video ==
An accompanying music video shot in Miami, directed by Charly Friedrichs and Oscar Verpoort, was released on YouTube on 9 April 2022.

== Track listings ==
"Come Around Again" digital download
No.	Title	Length
1.	"Come Around Again"	2:49
2.	"Come Around Again" (extended mix)	4:14
Total length:		7:03

"Come Around Again" (Club Mix)" digital download
No.	Title	Length
1.	"Come Around Again" (club mix)	2:58
2.	"Come Around Again" (extended club mix)	6:03
Total length:		9:01

"Come Around Again" (Starpicker remix) digital download
No.	Title	Length
1.	"Come Around Again" (Starpicker remix)	5:37
Total length:		5:37

== Credits and personnel ==
Adapted from Apple Music.

- Armin van Buuren – writing, production
- Benno de Goeij – writing, production
- John Callum Stewart – writing, vocals
- Tom Hollings – writing, production
- Sam Brennan – writing, production
- James Newman – writing
- Nick Sheldon – writing

== Charts ==
Weekly chart performance for "Come Around Again"
Chart (2022)	Peak position
Netherlands (Dutch Top 40)	13
Netherlands (Single Top 100)	75
Belgium (Ultratop 50 Flanders)	48

== Certifications ==
Certifications for "Come Around Again"
Region	Certification	Certified units/sales
Poland (ZPAV)	Gold	25,000^{‡}
^{‡} Sales+streaming figures based on certification alone.

== Release history ==
"Come Around Again" release history and formats
Region(s)	Date	Format(s)	Label(s)	Version	Ref.
Various	8 April 2022	Digital download; streaming	Armada	Original	
Various	10 June 2022	Digital download; streaming	Armada	Club mix	
Various	22 December 2023	Digital download; streaming	Armada	Starpicker remix	
