= Billen Ted =

British record production and songwriting duo

Billen Ted is a British record production, DJ and songwriting duo based in London, consisting of Tom Hollings and Sam Brennan.

== History ==
The duo became known for the single "Satisfied" which sampled from the Chaka Khan 1984 hit "I Feel for You". In 2021, they were one of the remixers of "Wellerman", a sea shanty originally recorded by the British singer Nathan Evans. The Official Chart Company gave the remixers a chart credit alongside the singer (as Nathan Evans x 220 Kid x Billen Ted) with the remix of the song topping the UK Singles Chart in March 2021. It also charted in other countries. The duo then followed up the number one with "When You're Out", a version of Kandi's "Don't Think I'm Not" with Eurovision star Mae Muller on vocals. As this record did not chart in the Top 75 it made the duo one-hit wonders.

On 20 June 2024, Billen Ted charted outside the Top 75 with a version of "Man In Finance (G6 Trust Fund)" by Girl On Couch. This release saw their version of Megan Boni's song "Man In Finance" being further remixed by David Guetta, with all three acts sharing a chart credit for their number 89 song.

Whilst seeing success as artists, the duo have become more known behind the scenes as producers and co-writers on many gold and platinum records for the likes of Anne-Marie and Aitch (Psycho), 220 Kid (Don't Need Love), KSI and Tom Grennan (Not Over Yet), Rudimental and Charlotte Plank (Dancing Is Healing) and Rain Radio (Talk About) as well as for other artists such as Gryffin, Tiësto, Rita Ora, Melanie C and Gracey. In August 2024, A Little Sound and Sugababes released the single "Situation", which Billen Ted produced alongside Kove.

== Discography ==
=== Singles ===
- 2020: "Satisfied"
- 2021: "Got You Covered" with Gracey
- 2021: "When You're Out" featuring Mae Muller
- 2022: "24/7" featuring JC Stewart
- 2022: "Come Around Again" with Armin van Buuren featuring JC Stewart
- 2022: "Step Correct" with Shift K3Y
- 2023: "Do U Want Me Baby" with Joel Corry featuring Elphi
- 2023: "Feel The Burn" featuring Kah-Lo
- 2024: "Man In Finance (G6 Trust Fund)" as David Guetta x Girl On Couch x Billen Ted (though Girl On Couch was credited first by the OCC)
- 2024: "Barcelona" with Wes Nelson

=== Remixes ===
List of Remixes, with selected chart positions and certifications, showing year released
| Title | Year | Peak chart positions | | Certifications |
| Title | Year | UK | IRL | Certifications |
|---|---|---|---|---|
| "Confetti" Little Mix (Billen Ted Remix) | 2020 | ― | ― | |
| "Love Not War (The Tampa Beat)" Jason Derulo & Nuka (Billen Ted Remix) | 2020 | ― | ― | |
| "Wellerman" Nathan Evans version (220 Kid and Billen Ted Remix) | 2021 | 1 | 2 | BPI: Silver |
| "Morning" Zara Larsson (Billen Ted Remix) | 2021 | ― | ― | |
| "Pick Me Up" Sam Feldt & Sam Fischer (Billen Ted Remix) | 2021 | ― | ― | |
| "Tangerine" Denis Coleman (Billen Ted Remix) | 2021 | ― | ― | |
| "Ruf Nicht Mehr An" Vanessa Mai (Billen Ted Remix) | 2021 | ― | ― | |
| "1 Day 2 Nights" Hrvy (Billen Ted Remix) | 2021 | ― | ― | |
| "Kiss My (Uh Oh)" Anne-Marie & Little Mix (Billen Ted Remix) | 2021 | ― | ― | |
| "Skin 2 Skin" Rêve (Billen Ted Remix) | 2021 | ― | ― | |
| "Sunshine" Liam Payne (Billen Ted Remix) | 2021 | ― | ― | |
| "Don't Break the Heart" Tom Grennan (Billen Ted Remix) | 2021 | ― | ― | |
| "Hopeless Romantic" Sam Fischer (Billen Ted Remix) | 2021 | ― | ― | |
| "Unbreakable" Telykast & Sam Gray (Billen Ted Remix) | 2021 | ― | ― | |
| "Lose You Again" Tom Odell (Billen Ted Remix) | 2021 | ― | ― | |
| "Remind Me" Tom Grennan (Billen Ted Remix) | 2022 | ― | ― | |
| "All Night & Every Day" Jonasu & Rêve (Billen Ted Remix) | 2022 | ― | ― | |
| "Drag Me Out" Kah-Lo (Billen Ted Remix) | 2022 | ― | ― | |
| "Karaoke" Sorana (Billen Ted Remix) | 2022 | ― | ― | |
| "21 Reasons" Nathan Dawe featuring Ella Henderson (Billen Ted Remix) | 2022 | ― | ― | |
| "Into My Body" Upsahl (Billen Ted Remix) | 2022 | ― | ― | |
| "Gone (Da Da Da)" Imanbek & Jay Sean (Billen Ted Remix) | 2022 | ― | ― | |
| "Cry To Me" Kilotile (Billen Ted Remix) | 2022 | ― | ― | |
| "Sorry" Tai'Aysha (Billen Ted Remix) | 2023 | ― | ― | |
| "Queen Of Kings" Alessandra (Billen Ted Remix) | 2023 | ― | ― | |
| "Dancing Is Healing" Rudimental (Billen Ted VIP Mix) | 2023 | ― | ― | |
| "Jack and Jill" Josh Breaks (Billen Ted Remix) | 2024 | ― | ― | |
