= Way Back Home (Shaun song) =

Single by Shaun

from the EP Take
- Released: June 27, 2018
- Genre: K-pop; Tropical house; Electronic; EDM
- Length: 3:34
- Label: DCTOM; Warner Music Korea
- Composers: Ji Hye Lee; Shaun

Music video
- "Way Back Home" on YouTube

"Way Back Home" is a song by South Korean musician Shaun. The song was released as the lead single for his debut solo EP Take on June 27, 2018.

== Background and composition ==
Shaun is a DJ and producer as well as keyboardist for the South Korean indie rock band The Koxx. He released his debut solo EP Take on June 27, 2018, with "Way Back Home" as the lead single.

Shaun stated that he originally wrote the melody for "Way Back Home" in 2015 as part of a song for JYJ's Kim Jae-joong. However, the melody was returned because it sounded similar to a separate, well-known Japanese song. According to Shaun, he still liked the melody so in 2018 he was able to remake the song in five hours. The song was composed by Shaun and Ji Hye Lee, and it was described by Billboard as being a "tropical-house dance track".

An edited version of "Way Back Home" by Dutch DJ Sam Feldt, featuring English-language lyrics sung by Conor Maynard, was later announced on July 16, 2018 and released on December 21, 2018.

== Reception ==
"Way Back Home" grew in popularity first in the Korean dance community through social media posts and fans sharing videos of Shaun's live performances at clubs and festivals. Specifically, the song was posted on a prominent Facebook page for music recommendations. The song and its videos eventually went viral, and the song appeared on digital trending charts. "Way Back Home" gradually gained playtime as the background music of cafes and TV shows as well as some celebrity promotions.

The song went on to achieve a "grand slam" on the morning of July 17, 2018, by attaining the number one position on all three major Korean music services: MelOn, Genie, and Olleh Music. However, because Shaun was a relatively lesser-known artist, the song's rise on the charts sparked allegations of "sajaegi", or chart manipulation, with some drawing comparisons to Nilo, who has previously also been accused of chart manipulation. Later that day, DCTOM Entertainment released a statement denying any chart manipulation, claiming instead to have used "viral marketing". The CEO of DCTOM Entertainment similarly denied any unlawful action. Shaun himself also denied any cheating, and he isolated himself from others and experienced serious psychological anxiety as a result of the accusations. Shaun responded on July 22, stating that he hoped the truth would be uncovered and apologizing for hurting his fans.

Meanwhile on July 18, Park Jin-young of JYP Entertainment stated that he would request an investigation from South Korea's Ministry of Culture, Sports and Tourism and the Fair Trade Commission. The next day, DCTOM Entertainment requested a police investigation into the issue. Shaun has also filed charges against some people for spreading rumors.

An investigation by DCTOM Entertainment found no evidence of chart manipulation, but rather that the song steadily climbed the charts due to people gaining interest in it. An investigation by the Korean Ministry of Culture, Sports and Tourism was conducted and concluded in January 2018. They were unable to prove nor disprove allegations of chart manipulation, due to the anonymity of users of online streaming platforms. A private company was hired to analyze the charts data, the Ministry announced on August 29, 2017 that it may take over a month to receive all of the data and then more time to actually analyze it.

== Charts ==
=== Weekly charts ===
Chart (2018–2020)	Peak position
Hungary (Rádiós Top 40)	18
Japan (Japan Hot 100) (Billboard)	97
Malaysia (RIM)	13
New Zealand Hot Singles (RMNZ)	24
Singapore (RIAS)	7
South Korea (Gaon)	1
South Korea (Kpop Hot 100)	1

=== Year-end charts ===
Chart (2018)	Position
South Korea (Gaon)	8
Chart (2019)	Position
South Korea (Gaon)	27
Chart (2020)	Position
South Korea (Gaon)	169
Chart (2021)	Position
South Korea (Gaon)	192

== Certifications ==
Region	Certification	Certified units/sales
New Zealand (RMNZ)	Gold	15,000^{‡}
South Korea (KMCA)	Platinum	2,500,000^{*}
Streaming
Japan (RIAJ)	Platinum	100,000,000^{†}
Japan (RIAJ) (feat. Conor Maynard) [Sam Feldt Edit]	Platinum	100,000,000^{†}
South Korea (KMCA)	2× Platinum	200,000,000^{†}
^{*} Sales figures based on certification alone.^{‡} Sales+streaming figures based on certification alone.^{†} Streaming-only figures based on certification alone.
