= Shaun (musician) =

South Korean musician (born 1990)

- Born: Kim Yoon-ho; January 12, 1990 (age 36); Seoul, South Korea
- Genres: Electronic; indie rock; indie pop
- Occupations: Musician; music producer; DJ; songwriter
- Instruments: Keyboards; vocals
- Years active: 2010–present
- Labels: HAU MUSIC PRODUCTION
- Member of: The Koxx

Korean name
- Hangul: 김윤호
- RR: Gim Yunho
- MR: Kim Yunho

Kim Yoon-ho (Korean: 김윤호; born January 12, 1990), known professionally as Shaun (숀), is a South Korean musician, producer, DJ, and songwriter.

== Career and Controversy ==
He debuted in 2010 as the keyboardist and backup singer of the indie rock band The Koxx. In July 2018, his solo song, "Way Back Home", unexpectedly topped the South Korean music charts, drawing accusations that he and his management had manipulated chart rankings. His management company denied the accusations, as did Shaun himself. After investigation by the Ministry of Culture, Sports, and Tourism, the accusations were found false.

== Discography ==
=== Extended plays ===
Title	Album details	Peak chart positions	Sales
Title	Album details	KOR	Sales
Take	Released: June 27, 2018; Label: DCTOM Entertainment, Warner Music Korea; Formats: CD, digital download; Track listing: 1. Way Back Home; 2. Thinking of You (생각나) (feat. Ovan & Sumin); 3. Nocturnal (야행성); 4. Arirang (아리랑)	—	—N/a
Hello (안녕)	Released: January 1, 2019; Label: DCTOM Entertainment, Warner Music Korea; Formats: CD, digital download; Track listing: 1. Traveler; 2. Bad Habits (습관); 3. Terminal (터미널)	—	—N/a
36.5	Released: August 15, 2019; Label: DCTOM Entertainment, Warner Music Korea; Formats: CD, digital download; Track listing: 1. Moon (달); 2. 36.5; 3. To Be Loved	—	—N/a
#0055b7	Released: May 9, 2021; Label: 285, Warner Music Korea; Formats: CD, digital download; Track listing: 1. Blue (feat. Wonstein); 2. Closed Ending (닫힌 엔딩)	—	—N/a
Omnibus Pt. 1: Kaleidoscope	Released: July 28, 2022; Label: 285, Warner Music Korea; Formats: digital download; Track listing: 1. Answer; 2. Don't Let Me Know; 3. Road	—	—N/a
Omnibus, Pt. 2: Inside Out	Released: December 9, 2022; Label: 285, Warner Music Korea; Formats: CD, digital download; Track listing: 1. Monsters; 2. Shooting Star; 3. Swan Song	—	—N/a

=== Remixes ===
Title	Album details	Peak chart positions	Sales
Title	Album details	KOR	Sales
Bring The Bounce	Released: December 3, 2015; Label: DCTOM Entertainment, Warner Music Korea; Format: CD, digital download; Track listing: 1. Bring The Bounce (Original Mix); 2. When It Drops (Original Mix)	—	—N/a
Way Back Home: The Remixes	Released: December 16, 2018; Label: DCTOM Entertainment, Warner Music Korea; Format: CD, digital download; Track listing: 1. Way Back Home (Mosimann Remix); 2. Way Back Home (Advanced Remix); 3. Way Back Home (Mav Remix); 4. Way Back Home (Inst.); 5. Way Back Home (Acapella)	—	—N/a
Give Me a Kiss (with Crash Adams)	Released: April 21, 2023; Label: Crash Adams Inc, Warner Music Canada; Format: Digital download	—	—N/a

=== Singles ===
Title	Year	Peak chart positions							Certifications	Album
Title	Year	KOR Gaon	KOR Hot	HUN	JPN Hot	MYS	NZ Hot	SGP	Certifications	Album
As lead artist
"Falling Into" (Radio Edit)	2015	—	—	—	—	—	—	—		Non-album singles
"Falling Into" (Original Mix)	2016	—	—	—	—	—	—	—		Non-album singles
"Silence" (Original Mix)	2017	—	—	—	—	—	—	—		Non-album singles
"Dream"	2017	—	—	—	—	—	—	—		Non-album singles
"Thinking Of" (생각나) (featuring Ovan & Sumin)	2018	— (Note: "Thinking Of" did not enter the Gaon Digital Chart, but peaked at number 88 on the Gaon Download Chart.)	—	—	—	—	—	—		Take
"Way Back Home"	2018	1	1	—	97	13	24	7	KMCA: 2× Platinum (Note: Streaming certification); KMCA: Platinum (Note: Download certification); RIAJ: Platinum (Note: Streaming certification); RMNZ: Gold	Take
"Bad Habits" (습관)	2019	16	15	—	—	—	—	—		Hello
"36.5"	2019	—	—	—	—	—	—	—		36.5
"Closed Ending" (닫힌엔딩)	2021	64	—	—	—	—	—	—		#0055b7
"Blue" (featuring Wonstein)	2021	—	91	—	—	—	—	—		#0055b7
"So Right" (featuring Yuna)	2022	—	—	—	—	—	—	—		Non-album single
"Answer"	2022	—	—	—	—	—	—	—		Omnibus Pt. 1: Kaleidoscope
"Don't Let Me Know"	2022	—	—	—	—	—	—	—		Omnibus Pt. 1: Kaleidoscope
"Road"	2022	—	—	—	—	—	—	—		Omnibus Pt. 1: Kaleidoscope
"For You"	2022	—	—	—	—	—	—	—		Non-album single
"Shooting Star"	2022	—	—	—	—	—	—	—		Omnibus, Pt. 2: Inside Out
"Steal The Show" (featuring Jeff Satur)	2023	—	—	—	—	—	—	—		Steal The Show
Collaborations
"Bring the Beat" (2014 World DJ Festival Anthem) (with Arikama & Juncoco)	2014	—	—	—	—	—	—	—		Non-album single
"Bring the Bounce" (Original Mix) (with Vandal Rock)	2015	—	—	—	—	—	—	—		Bring The Bounce
"Yeah Ah Gang" (with Epiik & Vandal Rock, featuring Revibe)	2018	—	—	—	—	—	—	—		Non-album singles
"Way Back Home" (Sam Feldt Edit) (featuring Conor Maynard)	2018	—	—	18	—	14	—	6	RIAJ: Gold (Note: Streaming certification)	Non-album singles
"She Is" (with Ovan)	2019	—	—	—	—	—	—	—		Non-album singles
"My Bad" (KSHMR Edit) (with Advanced, feat. Julie Bergan)	2020	—	—	—	—	—	—	—		Non-album singles
As featured artist
"Twenty" (Ovan featuring Shaun)	2018	78	80	—	—	—	—	—		Non-album single
"I'll Find You" (JSIN(제이신) featuring Shaun)	2021	78	80	—	—	—	—	—		JSIN(제이신) – Summer Mood Pack
"—" denotes release did not chart.

== Awards ==
=== Korean Popular Music Awards ===
Year	Category	Recipient	Result
2018	Best R&B	"Way back Home"	Nominated
2018	Best Indie	"Way back Home"	Won

=== Melon Music Awards ===
Year	Category	Recipient	Result
2018	Song of the Year	"Way Back Home"	Nominated
2018	Best Indie	"Way Back Home"	Nominated

=== Golden Disc Awards ===
Year	Category	Recipient	Result
2018	Digital Daesang	"Way Back Home"	Nominated
2018	Popularity Award	Shaun	Nominated
