= Post Malone (song) =

2019 single by Sam Feldt

Single by Sam Feldt featuring Rani

from the EP Magnets
- Released: 24 May 2019
- Genre: Tropical house
- Length: 2:54
- Label: Spinnin'
- Songwriters: Roxanne Emery; Shannon Hilversum; Jonas Kröper; Dominic Lyttle; Sammy Renders
- Producer: Sam Feldt

Sam Feldt singles chronology
"Hide & Seek" (2019)	"Post Malone" (2019)	"Winter Wonderland" (2019)

Rani singles chronology
"Crying In The Sun" (2018)	"Post Malone" (2019)	"Go Somewhere" (2019)

Music video
- "Post Malone" on YouTube

"Post Malone" is a song by Dutch DJ Sam Feldt featuring singer Rani. It was released on 24 May 2019 through Spinnin' Records as a single from Feldt's Magnets EP. The music video was directed by Deni Kukura and features drag queens Ma'maQueen, Abby Omg and Inga Shubskaya.

== Lyrics ==
The song was referred to as an "ode" to American musician Post Malone and features the lines "Tonight, we go all night long / We party like Post Malone!".

== Charts ==
=== Weekly charts ===
Chart (2019–2020)	Peak position
Australia (ARIA)	27
Austria (Ö3 Austria Top 40)	44
Belgium (Ultratip Bubbling Under Flanders)	31
Belgium (Ultratip Bubbling Under Wallonia)	17
Canada Hot 100 (Billboard)	62
Czech Republic Airplay (ČNS IFPI)	32
Denmark (Tracklisten)	37
Germany (GfK)	46
Hungary (Dance Top 40)	29
Hungary (Single Top 40)	24
Ireland (IRMA)	4
Lithuania (AGATA)	29
Netherlands (Dutch Top 40)	5
Netherlands (Single Top 100)	16
Norway (VG-lista)	17
Scotland Singles (OCC)	5
Slovakia Airplay (ČNS IFPI)	4
Slovenia (SloTop50)	21
Sweden (Sverigetopplistan)	82
Switzerland (Schweizer Hitparade)	59
UK Singles (OCC)	10
US Bubbling Under Hot 100 (Billboard)	10
US Hot Dance/Electronic Songs (Billboard)	4
US Dance Club Songs (Billboard)	44
US Pop Airplay (Billboard)	32
US Rolling Stone Top 100	97

=== Year-end charts ===
Chart (2019)	Position
Hungary (Dance Top 40)	93
Ireland (IRMA)	36
Netherlands (Dutch Top 40)	37
Netherlands (Single Top 100)	74
UK Singles (Official Charts Company)	94
US Hot Dance/Electronic Songs (Billboard)	15

Chart (2020)	Position
Australia (ARIA)	44
Austria (Ö3 Austria Top 40)	51
Germany (Official German Charts)	86
Switzerland (Schweizer Hitparade)	96
US Hot Dance/Electronic Songs (Billboard)	11

== Certifications ==
Region	Certification	Certified units/sales
Australia (ARIA)	Platinum	70,000^{‡}
Austria (IFPI Austria)	Platinum	30,000^{‡}
Canada (Music Canada)	2× Platinum	160,000^{‡}
Denmark (IFPI Danmark)	2× Platinum	180,000^{‡}
France (SNEP)	Gold	100,000^{‡}
Germany (BVMI)	Gold	200,000^{‡}
Italy (FIMI)	Gold	35,000^{‡}
New Zealand (RMNZ)	2× Platinum	60,000^{‡}
Poland (ZPAV)	Gold	25,000^{‡}
Portugal (AFP)	Gold	5,000^{‡}
Spain (Promusicae)	Gold	30,000^{‡}
United Kingdom (BPI)	Platinum	600,000^{‡}
United States (RIAA)	Platinum	1,000,000^{‡}
^{‡} Sales+streaming figures based on certification alone.
