= Yes (Sam Feldt song) =

Single by Sam Feldt featuring Akon

from the album Sunrise
- Released: 10 August 2017
- Genre: Deep house
- Length: 2:30
- Label: Spinnin'
- Songwriter(s): Sammy Renders; Thomas Troelsen; Lunchmoney Lewis; S. Martin
- Producer(s): Sam Feldt; Thomas Troelsen; Kaj Melsen

Sam Feldt singles chronology
| "Fade Away" (2017) | "Yes" (2017) | "Be My Lover" (2017) |

Akon singles chronology
| "Oh La La La" (2016) | "YES" (2017) |

Music video
- "YES" on YouTube

"Yes" (stylized YES) is a song by Dutch DJ Sam Feldt. It features American R&B singer Akon, was written by Sam Feldt, Thomas Troelsen, Lunchmoney Lewis, and S. Martin and produced by Feldt alongside Troelsen and Kaj Melsen. It was released on 10 August 2017 as the lead single from Feldt's upcoming debut album Sunrise.

== Background ==
Billboard described the song as "summery and sexual, catchy and laid-back." The song is composed of smooth tropical vibes and synth-based melody with a slowed tempo.

== Music video ==
Directed by Deni Kukura, the music video features body-painted ladies who dances around with Akon.

== Charts ==
| Chart (2017) | Peak position |
|---|---|
| Sweden (Sverigetopplistan) | 86 |
| US Hot Dance/Electronic Songs (Billboard) | 49 |
