= The Him =

Dutch DJ and music producer

- Origin: Amsterdam, Netherlands
- Genre: EDM • future house • future bass • dance-pop
- Years active: 2013-present
- Members: Jeroen Kerstens
- Past members: Steven Berghuijs
- Website: thehim.com

Jeroen Kerstens, also known by his stage name The Him, is a Dutch DJ and music producer. The name of his stage name was previously used for a DJ duo and electronic music production team consisting of himself and Steven Berghuijs, who parted ways in 2021 to focus on other things. The duo released music through several electronic dance music labels during its period of activity. Following the duo's dissolution, Kerstens continued releasing music under the name The Him as a solo artist.

== History ==
After collaborating for a Tiesto remix contest on Beatport in 2013, The Him became a duo.

In 2017, the duo released "I Wonder" as a single which features singer LissA.

In April 2018, the duo released a remix of the Avicii song, "Without You" which features Sandro Cavazza. Later in the month, they also collaborated with Dutch DJ Jay Hardway to release the song "Jigsaw". Hardway spoke about the duo, stating "I always want to collab with people who inspire me and The Him definitely inspire me musically."

== Discography ==
=== Charting singles ===
| Title | Year | Peak chart positions | Album |
| Title | Year | US Airplay | Album |
|---|---|---|---|
| Midnight Hearts | 2018 | 39 | Non-album single |

=== Other singles ===
- 2015: "Midnight Hearts" (with Sam Feldt featuring ANGI3) [Spinnin' Records]
- 2015: "Drive You Home" (with Sam Feldt featuring The Donnies The Amys) [Spinnin' Records]
- 2016: "Feels Like Home" (featuring Son Mieux) [Daily Deep / ATLAST, PowerHouse, Kontor, Universal]
- 2016: "Balance" (featuring Oktavian) [Daily Deep / ATLAST]
- 2016: "Don't Leave Without Me" (featuring Gia Koka) [Daily Deep / ATLAST, Kontor]
- 2017: "I Wonder" (featuring LissA) [Daily Deep / ATLAST, Polydor Records, Universal]
- 2017: "Secrets" (featuring Cub Rayan) [Daily Deep]
- 2017: "Oasis" (featuring Sorana) [Daily Deep]
- 2017: "Everbody Hurts" (featuring Ivy Adara) [Daily Deep]
- 2017: "Always" [Daily Deep]
- 2018: "White Lies" [Daily Deep]
- 2018: "Jigsaw" (with Jay Hardway) [Spinnin' Records]
- 2018: "Broken Love" (featuring Parson James) [Spinnin' Records]
- 2018: "By Your Side" (with Jordan Jay) [Spinnin' Records]
- 2018: "Nothing On Us" [Spinnin' Records]
- 2018: "Look At Us Now" [Spinnin' Records]
- 2019: "Unstoppable" [Spinnin' Records]
- 2019: "Tell Your Friends" (with Loote) [Spinnin' Records]
- 2019: "Found Me" (featuring Maria Hazell) [Spinnin' Records]
- 2019: "Walk Alone" [Spinnin' Records]
- 2019: "In My Arms" (featuring Norma Jean Martine) [Spinnin' Records]
- 2020: "Hurts So Good" (with ROE) [Spinnin' Records]
- 2020: "Freestyle Scientist" [Spinnin' Records]
- 2020: "Tragic" (featuring Amber van Day) [Spinnin' Records]
- 2020: "Babylonia" (with Robby East featuring Sarah De Warren) [Spinnin' Records]
- 2020: "Believe" (with Yall and Royale Avenue featuring Jay Nebula) [Spinnin' Records]
- 2020: "Use Your Love" (with Sam Feldt featuring Goldford) [Heartfeldt Records]
- 2020: "Love, Sweet & Tears" (featuring Danny Shah) [Spinnin' Records]
- 2021: "Desperados" (featuring Anica Russo) [Daily Deep / ATLAST]
- 2021: "Better Days" (featuring KOOLKID) [STMPD RCRDS]
- 2021: "Gravity" (featuring Georgie Keller) [Daily Deep / ATLAST]
- 2021: "Not Alone" [STMPD RCRDS]
- 2021: "When It Falls On You" (featuring Mila Falls) [Daily Deep / ATLAST]
- 2022: "Sometimes" (with DubVision) [Stmpd Rcrds]
- 2022: "Call My Name" (with Paradigm) [Daily Deep / ATLAST]
- 2022: "Senorita" (with NIGHTLINE) [Daily Deep / ATLAST, Zomba Recordings]
- 2022: "Guide You Home" [Daily Deep / ATLAST]
- 2022: "This Good" (with Deep Chills featuring Kelli-Leigh) [Daily Deep / ATLAST]
- 2022: "Lava" (with Dastic) [Daily Deep / ATLAST]
- 2022: "Before You Break" (with Bruno Martini) [Daily Deep, Universal]
- 2022: "Fool Me" (with OCEANS) [Daily Deep/ATLAST]
- 2022: "Violet Skies"(with BullySongs) [Daily Deep/ATLAST]
- 2023: "Best Friend" (with Maye Slade) [Daily Deep/ATLAST]
- 2023: "Set Me Free" [Daily Deep/ATLAST]
- 2023: "Wherever You Go" (with Georgie Keller) [Daily Deep/ATLAST]
- 2023: "I'm Coming Home" [Daily Deep/ATLAST]
- 2023: "Down The River" (with Mike Williams & Travis's Nightmare) [SPINNIN']
- 2023: "Late To The Party" [Daily Deep/ATLAST]
- 2023: "Dreams" (with Bikini Bandits) [Daily Deep/ATLAST]
- 2023: "Ocean Of Love" (with Steerner & KELLYKKE) [Daily Deep/ATLAST]
- 2023: "Love and Other Drugs" (The Him Edit) (with hey oli & Rebbi) [Daily Deep/ATLAST]
- 2023: "Summertime Sadness" [Daily Deep/ATLAST]
- 2023: “Umbrella” [Daily Deep/ATLAST]

=== Remixes ===
- 2015: Maroon 5 — "This Summer's Gonna Hurt" (The Him Remix)
- 2018: Lost Frequencies featuring The Nghbrs — "Like I Love You" (The Him Remix) [Astrx]
- 2019: Cash Cash featuring Nasri — "Call You" (The Him Remix) [Big Beat Records]
- 2020: Soleima — "Roses" (The Him Remix) [Big Beat Records]
