= Stronger (Sam Feldt song) =

Single by Sam Feldt featuring Kesha
- Released: 29 January 2021
- Genre: Tropical house; dance-pop
- Length: 2:53
- Label: Heartfeldt Records
- Songwriters: Adam Friedman; Dominic Anthony Lyttle; Kesha Sebert; Patrick Martin; Pete Nappi; Ryan Lewis; Sam Renders
- Producers: Sam Feldt; Petey Martin; Dom Lyttle

Sam Feldt singles chronology
"Everything About You" (2020)	"Stronger" (2021)	"Pick Me Up" (2021)

Kesha singles chronology
"They's a Person of the World" (2020)	"Stronger" (2021)	"Fancy Like" (2021)

Music video
- "Stronger" on YouTube

"Stronger" is a song by Dutch DJ Sam Feldt featuring American singer Kesha. It was released on 29 January 2021 via Heartfeldt Records. On 2 April 2021, Feldt released the song's club mix version.

== Background ==
Kesha told to EDM.com that the song is about "personal growth". "Stronger" — New beginnings — becoming a powerful person through various challenges. She said: "The tune feels like an expansion of his unmistakable upbeat, summertime sound."

== Music video ==
An accompanying "boxing-themed" music video was directed by Andrew Donoho. The video shows Kesha "facing off with herself in fight to the death", and Feldt plays a judge and announcer, watching on the fight.

== Credits and personnel ==
Credits adapted from AllMusic.

- Sam Feldt – primary artist, producer, programmer, composer
- Adam Friedman – composer
- Kesha – featured artist, composer
- Ryan Lewis – composer
- Dominic Lyttle – composer, producer
- Patrick Martin – composer
- Petey Martin – brass, drums, guitar, keyboards, marimba, moog Synthesizer, percussion, piano, producer, synthesizer, trumpet, vocals
- Pete Nappi – composer
- Joshua Rawlings – composer

== Charts ==
=== Weekly charts ===
Weekly chart performance for "Stronger"
Chart (2021)	Peak position
Hungary (Rádiós Top 40)	10
Hungary (Single Top 40)	36
New Zealand Hot Singles (RMNZ)	12
US Hot Dance/Electronic Songs (Billboard)	13

=== Year-end charts ===
Year-end chart performance for "Stronger"
Chart (2021)	Position
Hungary (Rádiós Top 40)	66
US Hot Dance/Electronic Songs (Billboard)	51

== Release history ==
Release history and versions for "Stronger"
Region	Date	Formats	Version	Label	Ref.
Various	29 January 2021	Digital download; streaming	Original	Heartfeldt	
Various	19 March 2021	Digital download; streaming	Frank Walker remix	Heartfeldt	
Various	2 April 2021	Digital download; streaming	Club mix	Heartfeldt	
Italy	2 April 2021	Radio airplay	Original	Warner Music Italy	
