= Rani (Dutch singer) =

Dutch-Surinam singer-songwriter (born 1999)

RANI
- Born: Shannon Sewrani Wandana Hilversum; 21 March 1999 (age 27); Netherlands
- Genres: Pop
- Instruments: Vocals, piano
- Years active: 2018–present
- Website: shannonrani.com

Shannon Sewrani Hilversum, known professionally as RANI (stylized in all caps), (born 21 March 1999), is a Dutch-Surinamese singer-songwriter.

== Career ==
She is best known for featuring on Sam Feldt's 2019 song "Post Malone". She also provided uncredited vocals for David Guetta's 2021 single, "Get Together". She has also provided vocals for Jonasu's 2021 single "Black Magic".

On November 12, 2021, Rani released her debut album entitled "396".

== Discography ==
=== Albums ===
Studio albums
Title	Album details
396	Released: November 12, 2021; Label: Sony Music Entertainment; Format: digital download

=== Singles ===
==== As lead artist ====
Title	Year
"Crying In The Sun" (with Faustix)	2018
"Go Somewhere" (with Kream)	2019
"Hush Hush"	2023
"Amen" (Note: Rani released an acoustic version of this song on January 12, 2024.)	2023
"Outside In"	2024
"Set Me Free"	2024
"Believe (Shooting Stars)" (with R3hab and Mufasa & Hypeman)	2024

==== As featured artist ====
Title	Year	Peak chart positions										Certifications	Album
Title	Year	NLD	AUS	AUT	BEL	DEN	FRA	GER	SWE	SWI	UK	Certifications	Album
"Post Malone" (Sam Feldt featuring Rani)	2019	19	27	—	81	37	—	46	82	59	10	ARIA: Platinum; BPI: Platinum; IFPI DEN: 2× Platinum; MC: Gold	Magnets
"Finally" (Jonas Blue featuring Rani)	2023	—	—	—	—	—	—	—	—	—	—		Together
"—" denotes a recording that did not chart or was not released.
