= List of artists who reached number one on the Czech Republic Rádio Top 100 =

This is a list of recording artists who have reached number one on the singles chart in Czech Republic, published by Rádio Top 100 Oficiální since 30 December 2002.

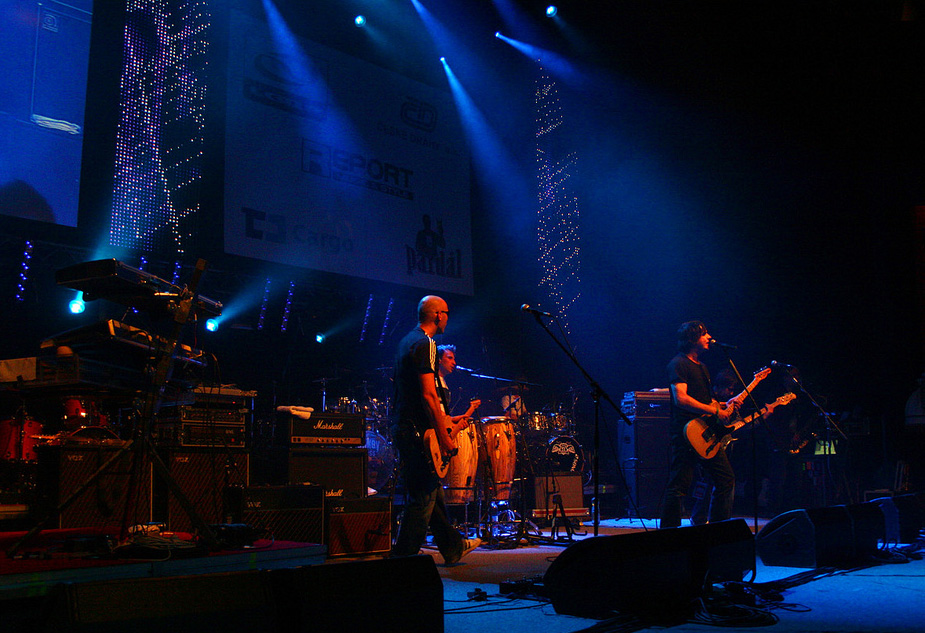
Chinaski holds the record for the most number-ones songs with 13 and best by group.

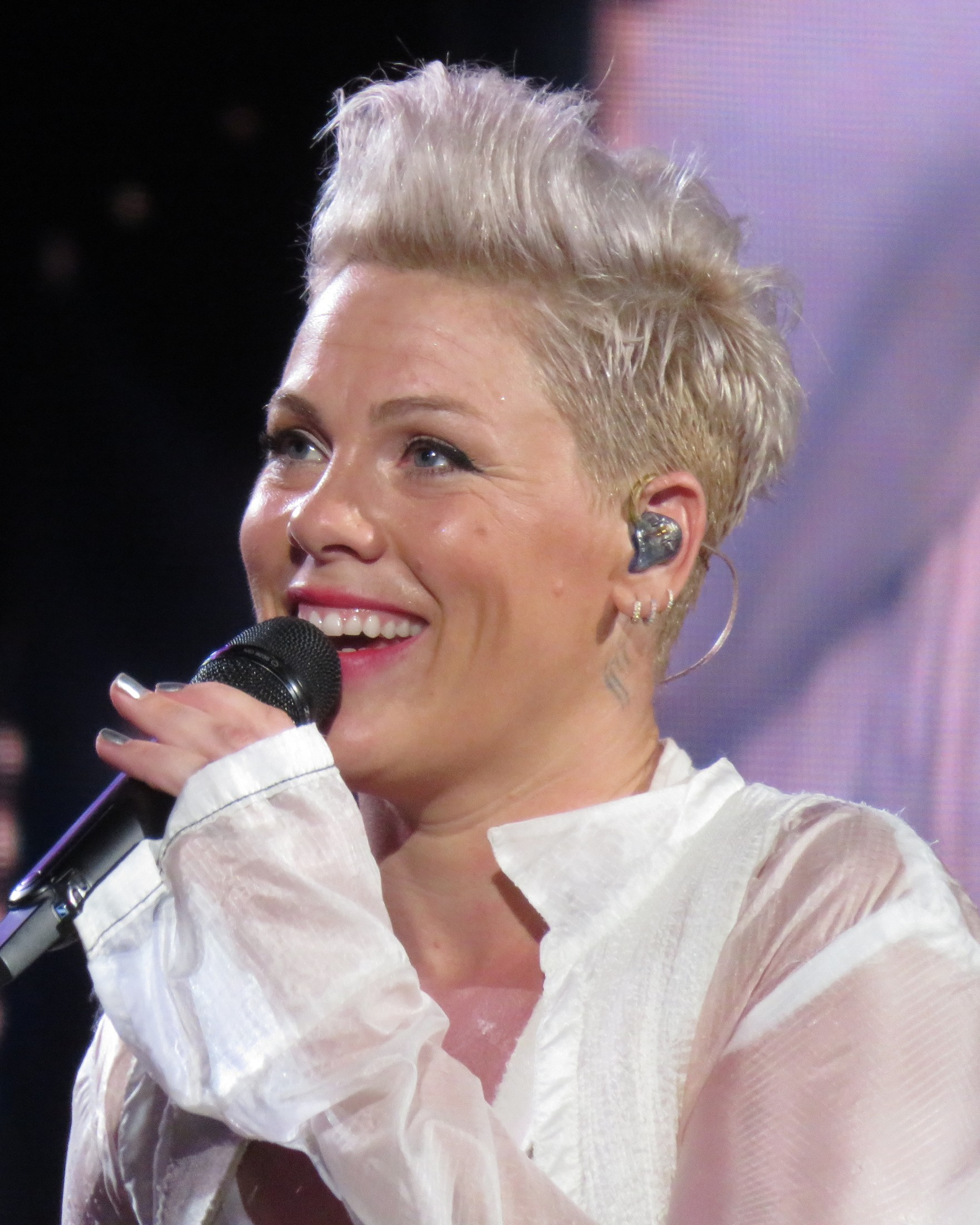
Pink holds the record for a female artist With 9.

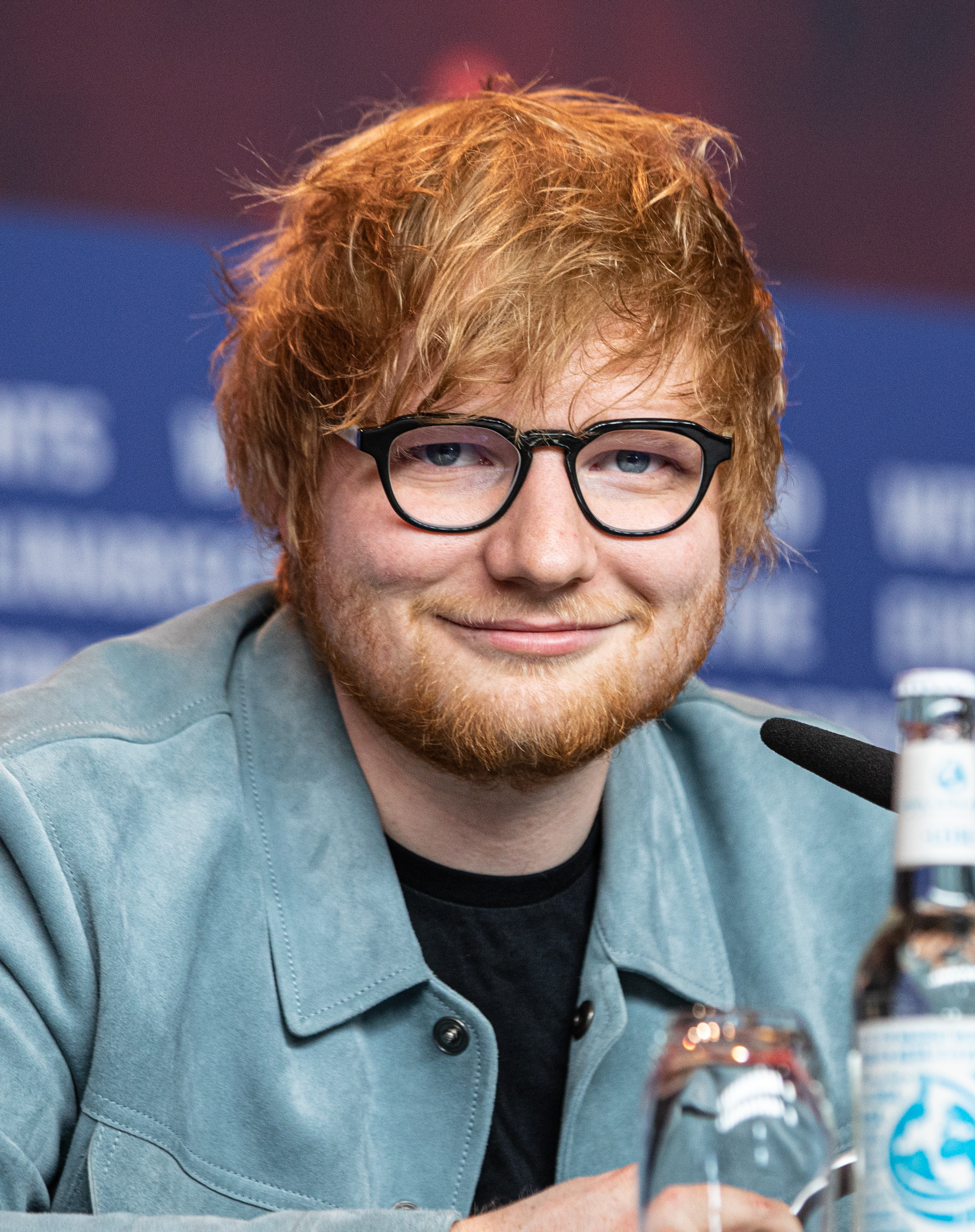
Ed Sheeran holds the record for the most number-one songs by a male artist with 6.

- All acts are listed alphabetically.
- Solo artists are alphabetized by last name, Groups by group name excluding "A", "An", and "The".
- Each act's total of number-one singles is shown after their name.
- All artists who are mentioned in song credits are listed here; this includes one-time pairings of otherwise solo artists and those appearing as featured. Members of a group who reached number one are excluded, unless they hit number one as a solo artist.

== A ==
- A7S (2)
- Gracie Abrams (1)
- Adele (5)
- Christina Aguilera (1)
- Akon (2)
- Lily Allen (1)
- Alphaville (1)
- Anastacia (1)
- DJ Antoine (1)
- Arash (1)
- Artemas (1)
- James Arthur (2)
- ATB (1)
- Atomic Kitten (1)
- Avicii (5)
- Axwell (1)

== B ==
- B.o.B. (1)
- Backstreet Boys (1)
- Shaun Baker (1)
- Dan Bárta (1)
- Natasha Bedingfield (1)
- Alec Benjamin (1)
- Justin Bieber (2)
- Lucie Bílá (1)
- Aloe Blacc (1)
- Fito Blanko (1)
- The Black Eyed Peas (5)
- James Blunt (2)
- Benson Boone (1)
- DJ Bobo (1)
- Bonn (1)

== C ==
- Camila Cabello (1)
- Calvin Harris (1)
- Henry Camamile (1)
- Lewis Capaldi (3)
- Dan Caplen (1)
- Alessia Cara (1)
- James Carter (1)
- The Chainsmokers (1)
- Charli XCX (1)
- Clean Bandit (1)
- Colbie Caillat (1)
- Coldplay (5)
- JP Cooper (1)
- Joel Corry (1)
- Chinaski (13)
- Cyril (1)
- Miley Cyrus (5)

== D ==
- Ray Dalton (1)
- DCUP (1)
- Dido (1)
- Celine Dion (1)
- Divokej Bill (1)
- Alesha Dixon (1)
- Dizzee Rascal (1)
- Dragonette (1)
- Emma Drobná (1)
- Duck Sauce (1)
- Elley Duhé (1)

== E ==
- Eamon (1)
- Mikky Ekko (1)
- Elly (1)
- Ellie Goulding (1)
- Endless Summer (1)
- George Ezra (2)

== F ==
- Alle Farben (2)
- Ewa Farna (3)
- Fast Boy (2)
- Faul & Wad Ad (1)
- Fergie (1)
- Flipsyde (1)
- Flo Rida (1)
- Luis Fonsi (1)
- Freshlyground (1)
- Nelly Furtado (2)

== G ==
- Lady Gaga (5)
- Galantis (1)
- Martin Garrix (1)
- Get Far (1)
- Global Deejays (1)
- Jess Glynne (2)
- Ellie Goulding (2)
- Karel Gott (1)
- Gotye (1)
- Green Day (3)
- David Guetta (7)
- Guru Josh Project (1)

== H ==
- Halsey (1)
- Calvin Harris (2)
- Oliver Heldens (1)
- Helene (1)
- Ella Henderson (2)
- Alex Hepburn (1)
- Becky Hill (1)
- Hozier (2)
- Michal Hrůza (1)
- Whitney Houston (1)

== I ==
- Ilira (1)
- Imagine Dragons (2)
- Enrique Iglesias (4)
- Sebastian Ingrosso (1)

== J ==
- Frankie J (1)
- Jack & Jack (1)
- Felix Jaehn (3)
- Jamelia (1)
- Jay-Z (1)
- Vika Jigulina (1)
- Elton John (1)
- Jonas Blue (1)
- Jonas Brothers (2)
- Mikolas Josef (1)
- Juanes (1)

== K ==
- Kaiser Chiefs (1)
- Kamrad (1)
- Katarína Knechtová (1)
- Dermot Kennedy (1)
- Khaled (1)
- Khalid (1)
- Kiddo (1)
- Elle King (1)
- Klingande (1)
- Tomáš Klus (1)
- Lenny Kravitz (1)
- Alicia Keys (1)
- Kimbra (1)
- Kodaline (1)
- Kryštof (11)
- Kygo (2)

== L ==
- Aneta Langerová (1)
- Lenka (1)
- Lenny (2)
- Dean Lewis (1)
- Dua Lipa (4)
- Limp Bizkit (1)
- Linkin Park (1)
- LMFAO (1)
- Jennifer Lopez (2)
- Lost Frequencies (3)
- Demi Lovato (1)
- LP (2)
- Lucenzo (1)
- Lucie (1)
- Lukas Graham (1)
- Lum!x (1)
- Lunchmoney Lewis (1)

== M ==
- Amy Macdonald (1)
- Macklemore (1)
- Madcon (1)
- Madonna (1)
- Mandrage (2)
- Post Malone (1)
- Maroon 5 (1)
- Bruno Mars (4)
- Marshmello (2)
- Marquess (1)
- Simona Martausová (1)
- Sam Martin (1)
- Norma Jean Martine (1)
- Ava Max (4)
- Edward Maya (1)
- Meduza (2)
- Shawn Mendes (3)
- Mig 21 (1)
- Miguel (1)
- Mika (1)
- Milk & Sugar (1)
- Milky Chance (1)
- Minelli (1)
- Mirai (6)
- MNEK (1)
- Morandi (2)
- Mr Probz (1)

== N ==
- Naughty Boy (1)
- Václav Neckář (1)
- Nightwork (1)
- No Doubt (1)

== O ==
- O5 (1)
- Oceana (1)
- Ofenbach (3)
- Don Omar (1)
- OMI (1)
- OneRepublic (1)
- Rita Ora (1)
- Outkast (1)

== P ==
- Passenger (1)
- Liam Payne (1)
- PEHA (1)
- Katy Perry (4)
- Peter Bič Project (1)
- Gary Pine (1)
- Pink (9)
- The Pirates (1)
- Pitbull (3)
- Plain White T's (1)
- Pnau (1)
- Gabry Ponte (1)
- Mike Posner (1)
- Daniel Powter (1)
- Prezioso (1)
- PSY (1)
- The Pussycat Dolls (1)

== R ==
- R3hab (3)
- RADEČEK (1)
- Raf (1)
- Carly Rae Jepsen (1)
- Ready Kirken (1)
- Rag'n'Bone Man (2)
- Regard (1)
- Bebe Rexha (1)
- Rihanna (3)
- Mark Ronson (1)
- Rosé (1)
- Marlon Roudette (1)
- Kelly Rowland (1)
- Rudimental (2)
- Nate Ruess (1)
- Rytmus (1)

== S ==
- Astrid S (1)
- Marta Santos (1)
- Nico Santos (1)
- Safri Duo (1)
- Michael Schulte (1)
- Robin Schulz (2)
- September (1)
- Shakira (3)
- Sheppard (1)
- Ed Sheeran (6)
- Sia (2)
- Matt Simons (1)
- Bob Sinclair (1)
- Erika Sirola (1)
- Myles Smith (2)
- Sam Smith (1)
- Snow (1)
- Martin Solveig (1)
- Álvaro Soler (4)
- Sombr (1)
- JC Stewart (1)
- Stromae (1)
- Harry Styles (1)
- Sugababes (2)
- Support Lesbiens (2)
- Taylor Swift (2)
- Teddy Swims (2)
- Switch Disco (1)

== T ==
- Michel Teló (1)
- Jasmine Thompson (1)
- Justin Timberlake (1)
- Timbaland (1)
- Tina (1)
- Tiësto (1)
- Tones and I (2)
- Topic (2)
- Tribbs (1)
- Twenty One Pilots (1)

== U ==
- Umakart (1)

== V ==
- Vaya Con Dios (1)
- Velile (1)
- Verona (2)
- Violet Days (1)

== W ==
- Wanastowi Vjecy (1)
- Alan Walker (3)
- Alex Warren (1)
- Nick Waterhouse (1)
- The Weeknd (2)
- Weibird (1)
- Welshly Arms (1)
- Westlife (1)
- Hayley Williams (1)
- Robbie Williams (1)
- Pharrell Williams (1)
- Wisin (1)

== X ==
- Xindl X (5)

== Y ==
- Daddy Yankee (1)
- Yolanda Be Cool (1)
- Younotus (1)

== Z ==
- David Žbirka (1)
- Miro Žbirka (1)
- Helena Zeťová (1)
- Zonderling (1)
- Marek Ztracený (1)
