= JC Stewart =

Singer-songwriter from Northern Ireland

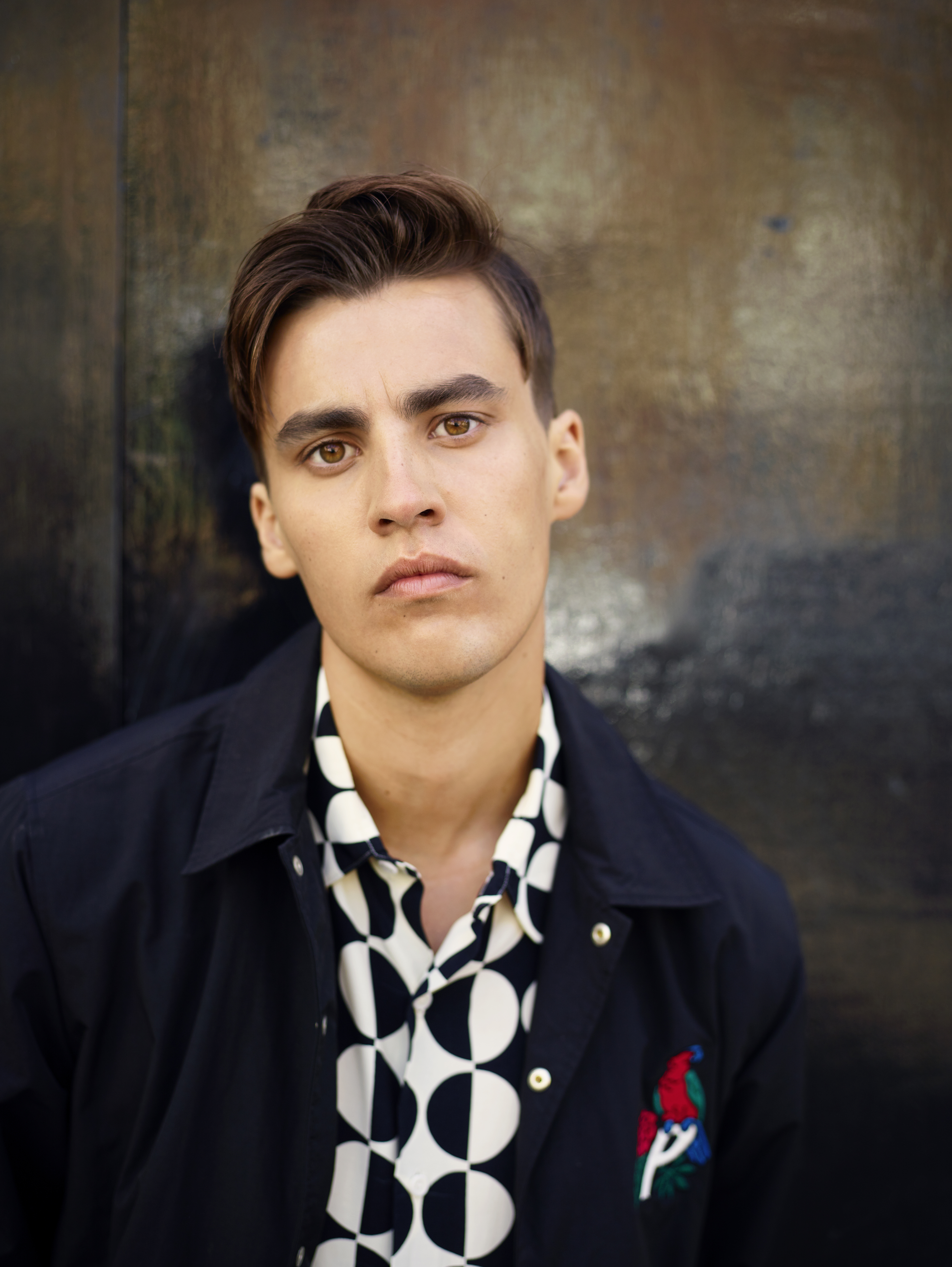
- Stewart in 2020

Background information
- Also known as: Callum Stewart
- Born: John Callum Stewart; 8 February 1997 (age 28); Magherafelt, County Londonderry, Northern Ireland
- Genres: Pop
- Occupations: Singer, songwriter
- Years active: 2014—present
- Labels: Warner
- Website: http://iamjcstewart.com

John Callum Stewart (born 8 February 1997), known professionally as JC Stewart or Callum Stewart, is a singer-songwriter from Northern Ireland. In 2020, he went viral after Jennifer Aniston reposted his parody of the theme song from Friends. He released his EP When the Lights Hits the Room later that year.

== Early life ==
Stewart grew up on a farm in Magherafelt, County Londonderry, Northern Ireland. He has two younger sisters and is the fourth generation of JC Stewarts, with his family running a grocery business of the same name.

Despite not coming from a particularly musical family, Stewart sang in school and was encouraged by his mum to attend a local theatre where he learnt to make music and fell in love with songwriting aged 14. He notes that his dad's record collection inspired him to listen to the Who and the Band.

Once he had finished school Stewart took a gap year and then moved to Brighton to study International Relations at Sussex University but dropped out of university and moved to London to pursue music instead.

== Career ==
In 2014, Stewart independently released his debut single "Gold".

He signed to Warner Records in 2018 and released two singles, "Medicine" and "Like I Did". Stewart co-wrote the track "Hollywood" which featured on Lewis Capaldi's 2019 debut album Divinely Uninspired to a Hellish Extent. Stewart released four further tracks of his own that year:"Have You Had Enough Wine?", "Bones", "Pick Up Your Phone" and "The Wrong Ones". Stewart held a four-night residency at the Islington in September 2019, which sold out within a few hours. He also toured with the likes of Lewis Capaldi, Lauv and Anne-Marie.

In 2020, Stewart released two singles "Lying That You Love Me" and "I Need You to Hate Me". He uploaded a parody of the Friends theme song, "I'll Be There for You", to TikTok which caught the attention of Jennifer Aniston and subsequently led to his first appearances on U.S. television. His collaboration on a track with 220 Kid, "Too Many Nights", which peaked at number 72 on the UK Singles Chart. Stewart also released his debut EP When the Light Hits the Room in November 2020. He co-wrote the EP in two weeks with Tom Odell, whom he has cited as one of his biggest musical heroes.

In January 2021, Stewart released his single "Break My Heart", which was co-written with Niall Horan and Plested. He was also named MTV's Push Artist of the Month.

== Discography ==
=== Studio albums ===
Title	Details
Space Hurts	Released: 20 June 2025; Label: Stanley Park Records; Format: Digital download, streaming

=== Extended plays ===
Title	Details
When the Light Hits the Room	Released: 6 November 2020; Label: Warner; Format: Digital download, streaming
Apple Music Home Session: JC Stewart	Released: 12 February 2021; Label: Sunshine Boy, Warner; Format: Digital download, streaming
Tomorrow	Released: 29 January 2025; Label: Stanley Park Records; Format: Digital download, streaming

=== Singles ===
Title	Year	Peak chart positions									Certifications	Album
Title	Year	UK	BEL (FL)	BEL (WA)	CZE	GER	IRE	MEX	NLD	POL	Certifications	Album
"Gold" (Note: Released under the name Callum Stewart.)	2014	—	—	—	—	—	—	—	—	—		Non-album singles
"Parachute"	2016	—	—	—	—	—	—	—	—	—		Non-album singles
"The Dam"	2017	—	—	—	—	—	—	—	—	—		Non-album singles
"Medicine"	2018	—	—	—	—	—	—	—	—	—		Non-album singles
"Like I Did"	2018	—	—	—	—	—	—	—	—	—		Non-album singles
"Girls Just Want to Have Fun"	2018	—	—	—	—	—	—	—	—	—		Non-album singles
"Have You Had Enough Wine?"	2019	—	—	—	—	—	—	—	—	—		Non-album singles
"Bones"	2019	—	—	—	—	—	—	—	—	—		Non-album singles
"Pick Up Your Phone"	2019	—	—	—	—	—	—	—	—	—		Non-album singles
"The Wrong Ones"	2019	—	—	—	—	—	—	—	—	—		Non-album singles
"Lying That You Love Me"	2020	—	—	— (Note: "Lying That You Love Me" did not chart on the Ultratop 50, but peaked at number 45 on the Walloon Ultratip chart.)	—	—	—	—	—			Non-album singles
"I Need You to Hate Me"	2020	—	36	17	1	75	—	12	85	—		Non-album singles
"Too Many Nights" (with 220 Kid)	2020	74	—	—	—	—	56	—	—	—	BPI: Silver	Non-album singles
"Rest Of My Life"	2020	—	—	—	—	—	—	—	—	—		When The Lights Hit The Room
"Break My Heart"	2021	96	25	33	—	—	—	—	—	—		Non-album singles
"Loud"	2021	—	—	—	—	—	—	—	—	—		Non-album singles
"Don't Say You Love Me"	2021	—	—	—	—	—	—	—	—	—		Non-album singles
"Didn't Know Shit" (with LOVA and Kina)	2021	—	—	—	—	—	—	—	—	—		Non-album singles
"On My Mind" (with Jonasu)	2021	—	—	—	—	—	—	—	—	—		Non-album singles
"24/7" (with Billen Ted)	2022	—	—	—	—	—	—	—	—	—		Non-album singles
"Love Like That"	2022	—	—	—	—	—	—	—	—	49		Non-album singles
"Come Around Again" (with Armin van Buuren and Billen Ted)	2022	—	—	—	49	—	—	—	75	2	ZPAV: Gold	Feel Again, Pt. 1
"Scars"	2022	—	—	—	—	—	—	—	—	—		Non-album single
"Hey Babe, I'm a Mess, I'm Sorry"	2024	—	—	—	—	—	—	—	—	—		Space Hurts
"BT45"	2024	—	—	—	—	—	—	—	—	—		Space Hurts
"Can't Stop"	2024	—	—	—	—	—	—	—	—	—		Space Hurts
"Waste"	2024	—	—	—	—	—	—	—	—	—		Space Hurts
"Tomorrow"	2025	—	—	—	—	—	—	—	—	—		Space Hurts
"Space Hurts"	2025	—	—	—	—	—	—	—	—	—		Space Hurts
"—" denotes a recording that did not chart or was not released in that territory.

== See also ==
- List of artists who reached number one on the Czech Republic Rádio Top 100
