= The Koxx =

South Korean indie rock band

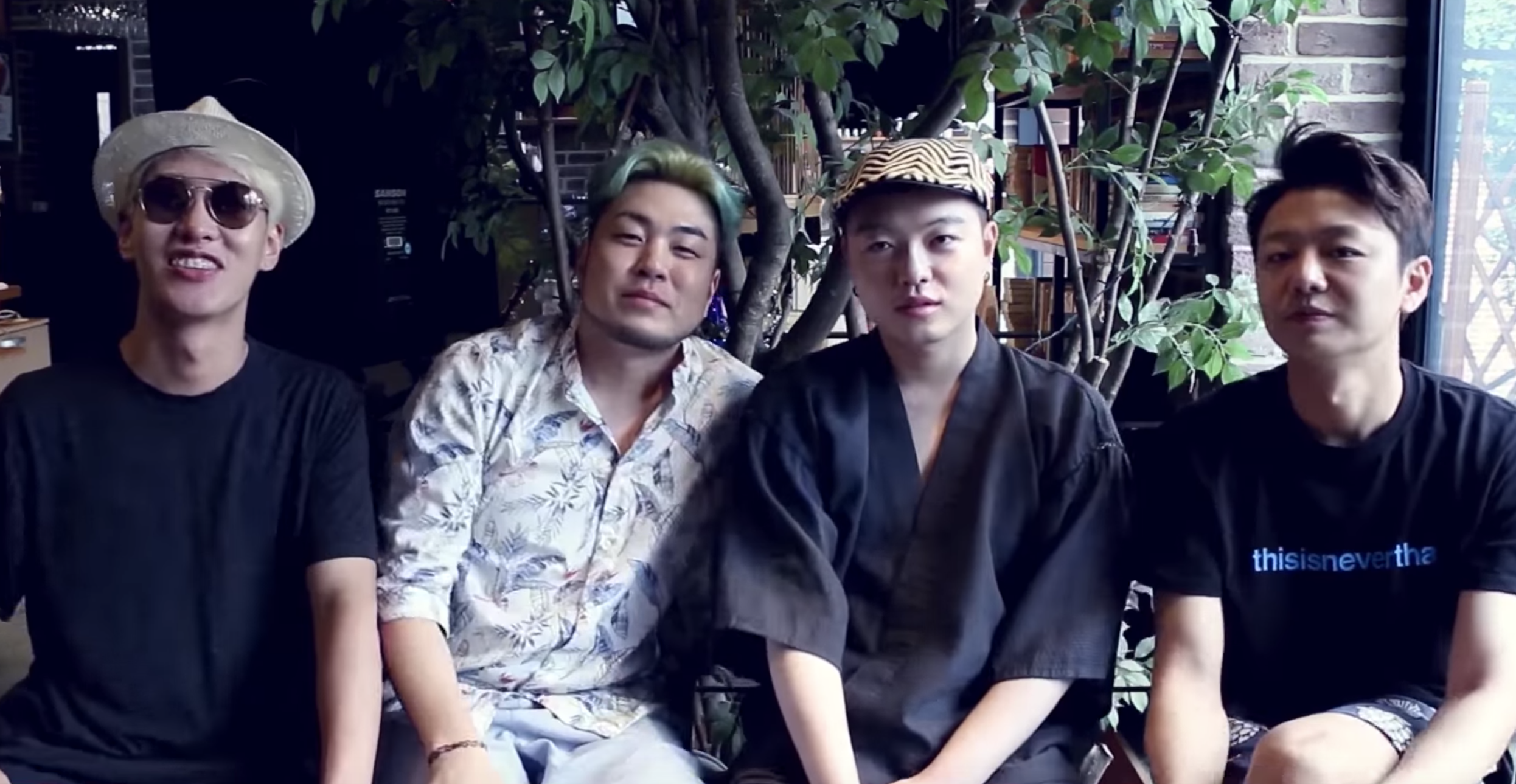
- The Koxx in 2017

Background information
- Origin: South Korea
- Genres: Electro, garage rock
- Years active: 2009–present
- Labels: Happy Robot Records
- Members: Lee Hyunsong; Lee Sooryun; Park Sunbin; Shaun
- Past members: Shin Saron

The Koxx (Hangul: 칵스) is a South Korean indie rock band that formed in 2009. They are also involved in the production of k-pop songs.

== History ==
In 2008, The Koxx got together and played a show for an end of the year party with friends. Afterwards they formed a band starting in 2009 and debuted on the reality show Hello Rookie. They released their first EP, Enter, on June 15, 2010. On June 15, 2011, The Koxx released their first studio album, Access OK. At the end of the year, The Koxx held their first solo concert, Success OK, and went on a tour in Japan, playing at clubs in Tokyo, Osaka, and Nagoya.

The Koxx won the "Discovery of the Year" Award on February 22, 2012 at the Gaon Chart K-Pop Awards. Beginning in 2012, the band began appearing on KBS' reality show Top Band 2. On June 26, 2012 they released their second EP, Bon Voyage. The Koxx began hiatus in 2013 when many of the members began their military service.

In 2015, The Koxx announced they would perform at Fuji Rock Festival and that they were working to release a new album that same year.

== Members ==
- Lee Hyunsong (이현송) – vocals, guitar
- Lee Sooryun (이수륜) – guitar
- Park Sunbin (박선빈) – bass
- Shaun (숀) – synthesizers, supporting vocals

=== Past members ===
- Shin Saron (신사론) – drums

== Discography ==
=== Studio albums ===
Title	Album details	Peak chart positions
Title	Album details	KOR
Access OK	Released: June 15, 2011; Label: Happy Robot Records; Format: CD, digital download	—
The New Normal	Released: November 10, 2015; Label: Happy Robot Records; Format: CD, digital download	—
"—" denotes release did not chart.

=== Extended plays ===
Title	Album details	Peak chart positions
Title	Album details	KOR
Enter	Released: June 15, 2010; Label: Happy Robot Records; Format: CD, digital download	—
Bon Voyage	Released: June 26, 2012; Label: Happy Robot Records; Format: CD, digital download	—
Red	Released: July 19, 2017; Label: Happy Robot Records; Format: CD, digital download	42
"—" denotes release did not chart.

=== Singles ===
Title	Year	Peak chart positions	Album
Title	Year	KOR	Album
"Jump to the Light"	2011	—	Access OK
"Oriental Girl"	2011	—	Access OK
"You're Not Others" (넌 남이 아냐)	2011	—	Tribute 90
"Trojan Horse"	2015	—	The New Normal
"—" denotes release did not chart.
