= Jonasu =

German DJ and producer

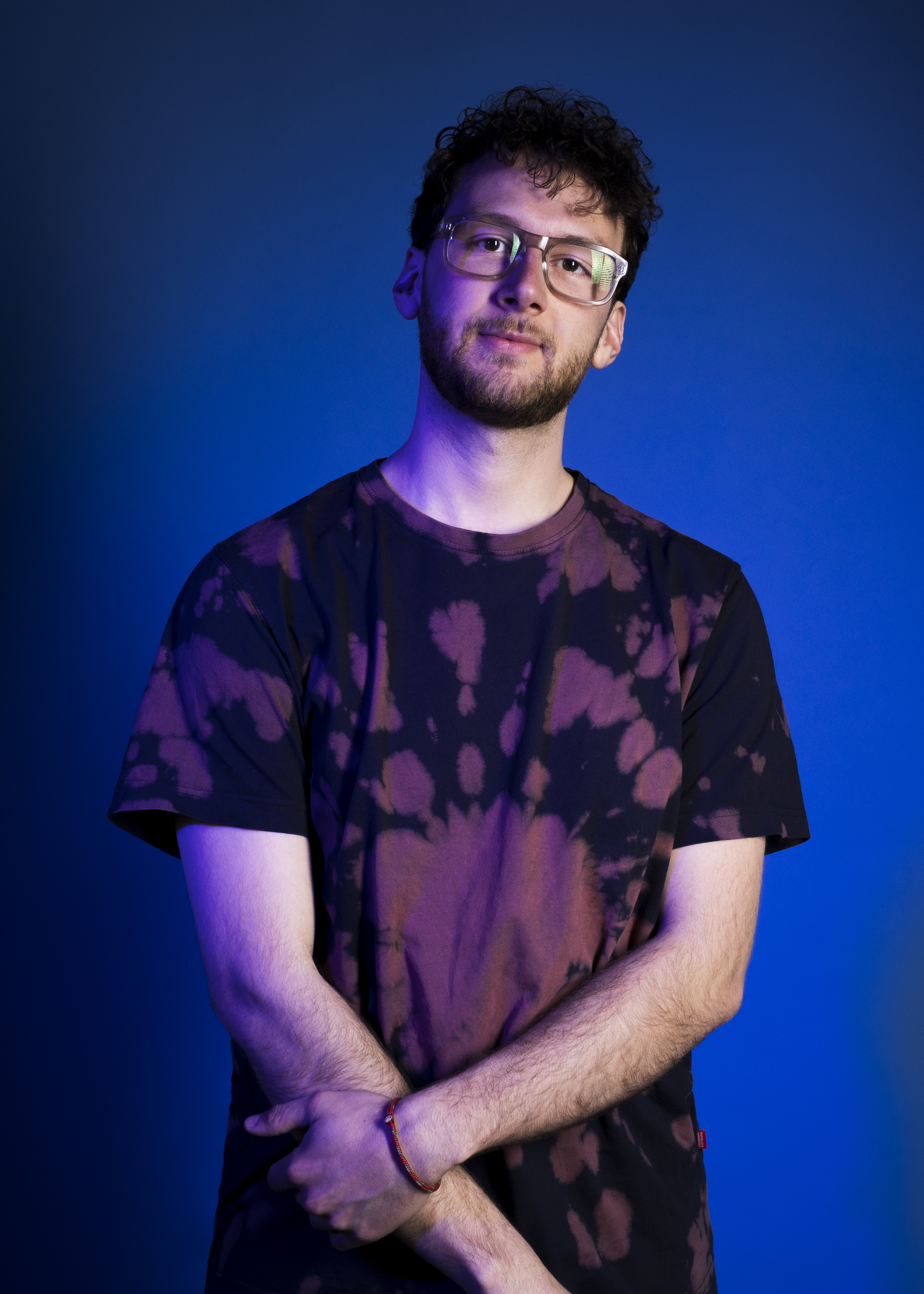
- Jonasu in 2021

Background information
- Born: Jonas David Kröper; 25 August 1990 (age 36); Mannheim, Germany
- Occupations: DJ; music producer; songwriter
- Years active: 2018–present
- Label: 3 Beat
- Website: jonasu.com

Jonas David Kröper (born 25 August 1990), also known by his stage name Jonasu, is a German DJ and music producer based in Berlin. His single "Black Magic" charted in the top 5 in the UK and Ireland in July 2021.

== Early life ==
Born in Mannheim, he attended the Johann Sebastian Bach Gymnasium before studying jazz drums at the Conservatory of Amsterdam.

== Career ==
In 2020, Jonasu received two Buma Awards for co-writing the song "Post Malone" by Sam Feldt featuring Rani. He produced the 2020 single "Pon It" by New Zealand rapper JessB. After being used in an episode of British dating game show Love Island in June 2021, his 2020 single "Black Magic" registered a 59% increase in daily Spotify streams and entered the top 40 of the UK Singles Chart.

== Discography ==
- Cutting Through Noise (2022)

=== Singles ===
List of singles as lead artist, with chart positions and year released
Title	Year	Peak chart positions				Certifications	Album
Title	Year	IRL	SVK	UK	UK Dance	Certifications	Album
"Let It Be Me" (featuring Naum)	2018	—	—	—	—		Non-album singles
"LA City Limits" (featuring Emy Perez)	2019	—	—	—	—		Non-album singles
"Lost in Amsterdam" (with Möwe featuring Eskeemo)	2019	—	—	—	—		Non-album singles
"Wannabe"	2019	—	—	—	—		Non-album singles
"I Hate Goodbyes" (with Maggie Szabo)	2019	—	—	—	—		Non-album singles
"Thinkin Bout You" (with Jantine)	2019	—	—	—	—		Non-album singles
"Top of the World" (featuring Duncan Townsend)	2020	—	—	—	—		Non-album singles
"Everywhere" (featuring Eskeemo)	2020	—	—	—	—		Non-album singles
"Habits (Stay High)" (with Felix Samuel)	2020	—	—	—	—		Cutting Through Noise
"Black Magic"	2020	4	76	3	1	BPI: Platinum	Cutting Through Noise
"Bad Gyal" (with Busy Signal)	2021	—	—	—	—		Non-album single
"My Love for You"	2021	—	—	—	—		Cutting Through Noise
"Make My Mind Go" (with Martin Jensen, Rompasso, and Faulhaber)	2021	—	—	—	—		Non-album single
"On My Mind" (with JC Stewart)	2021	—	—	—	—		Cutting Through Noise
"All Night & Every Day" (with Rêve)	2022	—	—	—	—		Cutting Through Noise
"Why Don't We" (with Koolkid)	2022	—	—	—	—		Cutting Through Noise
"—" denotes a recording that did not chart or was not released.
