= On & On (Armin van Buuren and Punctual song) =

Song by Armin van Buuren

Single by Armin van Buuren and Punctual featuring Alika

from the album Feel Again
- Released: 31 March 2023
- Recorded: 2022
- Genre: Slap house; dance-pop
- Length: 2:50
- Label: Armada
- Songwriters: Armin van Buuren; Will Lansley; John Morgan; Alika Mcgilivary; John Dirne
- Producers: Armin van Buuren; Punctual; John Christian; Carl Ryden

Armin van Buuren singles chronology
"Easy to Love" (2023)	"On & On" (2023)	"When We Come Alive" (2023)

Punctual singles chronology
"Body Language" (2023)	"On & On" (2023)	"Fever" (2021)

Alika singles chronology
"Wavey" (2017)	"On & On" (2023)

"On & On" is a song performed by Dutch DJ and record producer Armin van Buuren in collaboration with British record production duo Punctual. It features vocals from London-based rapper and singer Alika. It was released on 31 March 2023 by Armada Music, as the seventh single from the album Feel Again.

== Music video ==
A music video of the song was released on van Buuren's YouTube channel on 24 April 2023.

== Track listings ==
- Digital download (ARMAS2441)
1. "On & On" – 2:50
- Digital download (ARMAS2441)
1. "On & On" – 2:50
2. "On & On" (Extended Mix) – 4:04

== Charts ==
Chart (2023)	Peak position
US Hot Dance/Electronic Songs (Billboard)	30
US Dance/Mix Show Airplay (Billboard)	11
