= Black Magic (Jonasu song) =

Single by Jonasu

from the album Cutting Through Noise
- Released: 18 December 2020
- Genre: Slap house
- Length: 2:53
- Label: 3 Beat
- Songwriters: Jonas Kröper; RØRY; Shannon Hilversum
- Producer: Jonasu

Jonasu singles chronology
"Habits (Stay High)" (2020)	"Black Magic" (2020)	"Bad Gyal" (2021)

Music video
- "Black Magic" on YouTube

"Black Magic" is a song by German DJ and producer Jonasu, released as a single on 18 December 2020 by 3 Beat Records. It was written by Jonasu, RØRY, and Dutch singer Rani who also provided uncredited vocals. Remixes by SHOSH and Tim Croft were released on 26 March and 11 June 2021 respectively. After being used in an episode of British dating game show Love Island in June 2021, the song registered a 59% increase in daily Spotify streams and entered the top 40 of the UK Singles Chart.

== Track listing ==
- Digital download and streaming
1. "Black Magic" – 2:53
- Digital download and streaming – SHOSH remix
1. "Black Magic" (SHOSH Remix) – 3:03
- Digital download and streaming – Tim Croft remix
1. "Black Magic" (Tim Croft Remix) – 2:58

== Personnel ==
Credits adapted from Qobuz.

- Jonasu – production, mixing, programming
- Rani – vocals
- Fabian Lenssen – mastering

== Charts ==
=== Weekly charts ===
Weekly chart performance for "Black Magic"
Chart (2021)	Peak position
Ireland (IRMA)	4
Slovakia Airplay (ČNS IFPI)	76
UK Singles (OCC)	3
UK Dance (OCC)	1

=== Year-end charts ===
Year-end chart performance for "Black Magic"
Chart (2021)	Position
Ireland (IRMA)	21
UK Singles (OCC)	22

== Certifications ==
Region	Certification	Certified units/sales
United Kingdom (BPI)	Platinum	600,000^{‡}
^{‡} Sales+streaming figures based on certification alone.
