= Sam Feldt =

Dutch DJ, record producer and entrepreneur (born 1993)

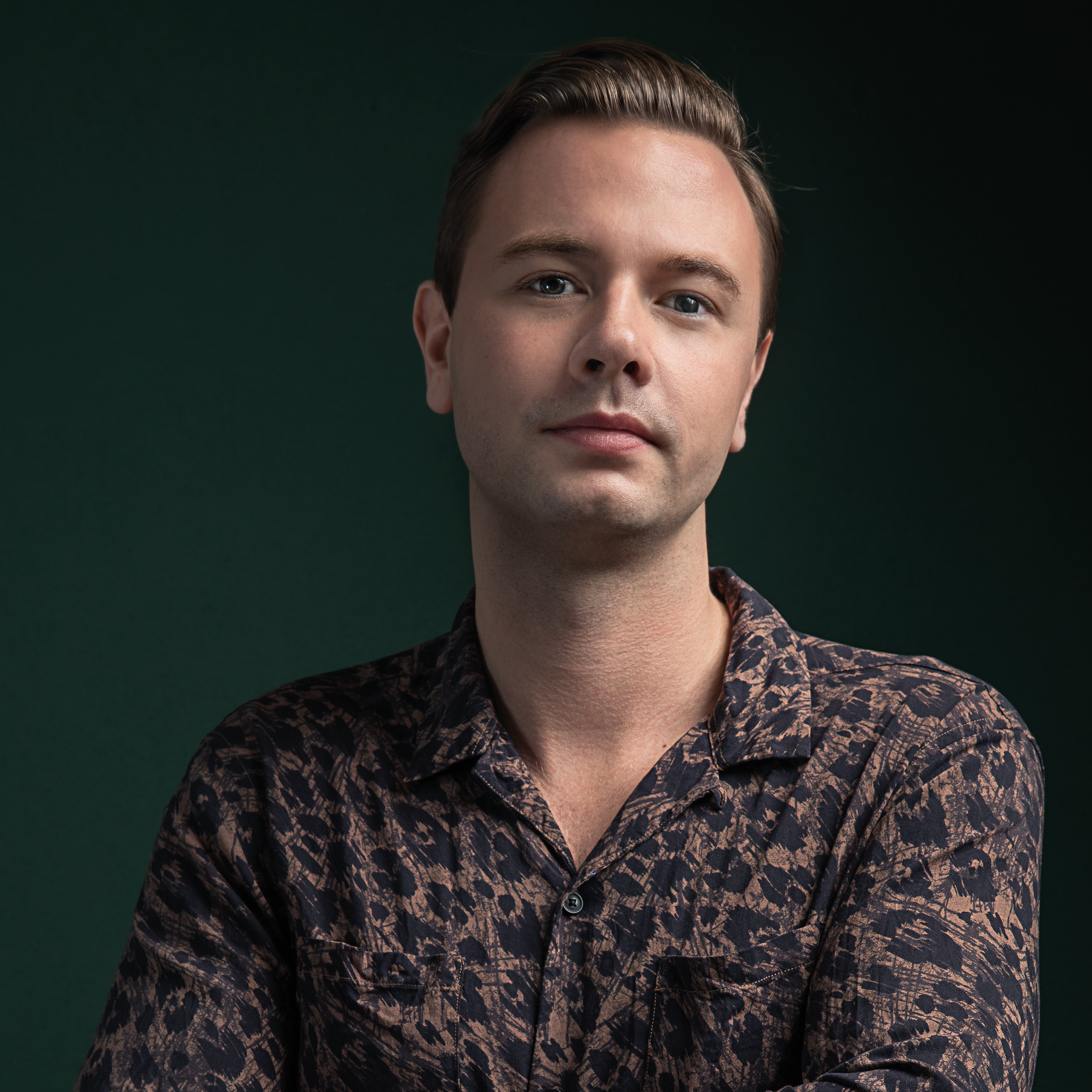
- Feldt in 2021

Background information
- Born: Sammy Boeddha Renders; 1 August 1993 (age 33); Boxtel, North Brabant, Netherlands
- Genres: House; deep house; tropical house; future house
- Occupations: DJ; record producer; entrepreneur; record label owner
- Instruments: Piano; keyboards; synthesizers; FL Studio
- Years active: 2014–present
- Labels: Heartfeldt; Spinnin'; Spinnin' Deep; Universal; Island; Polydor
- Website: heartfeldt.me samfeldt.com

Sammy Boeddha Renders (born 1 August 1993), known professionally as Sam Feldt, is a Dutch DJ, record producer and entrepreneur.

== Career ==
=== Musical career ===
In 2015, he released a remake of Robin S.' "Show Me Love". The track was released by Spinnin' Records and Polydor. It became an instant hit, peaking at number 4 on the UK Singles Chart and reached the 21st position on the Dutch Top 40. In Australia, "Show Me Love" was certified gold. In Belgium, Feldt's track reached 15 and 13 on Billboard's Dance/Electronic Songs chart. In 2016, Sam Feldt released the song "Summer on You" together with Lucas & Steve. After reaching the number 4 spot in the Dutch Top 40, it became the most played track on Dutch radio in September and October 2016. Shortly after the release of "Summer on You", the track was awarded with a Platinum award in the Netherlands. Feldt was ranked on DJ Mag's list of the Top 100 DJs of 2017 at 75.

Billboard described Feldt as "a modern house superstar", and his treatment of "Show Me Love" as "Anne reshapes the famous melody, while Feldt echoes the original with a bubbly deep house beat." The single "The Devil's Tears" (Sam Feldt Edit) was one of Spotify's top 10 most viral tracks. Feldt's debut album Sunrise was released on 6 October 2017, via Spinnin' Records. On 24 November 2017 Feldt released a double album titled Sunrise to Sunset, which consists of songs from his debut studio album and 12 additional songs. The double album was followed by his remix album After The Sunset, featuring remixes from Zonderling, Breathe Carolina and Calvo. In 2019, Feldt released his track "Post Malone", which has hit 375 million streams on Spotify, as of November 2020.

With his project Sam Feldt Live, Feldt combines his digital music production with live instruments. His band, composed of Dutch trumpeter Quirijn and Dutch saxophonist Tariq, is featured on multiple Sam Feldt songs.

In 2020, Feldt revealed his own record label known as Heartfeldt Records, with "Hold Me Close" featuring Ella Henderson as the first official release. He has also created his own charity, The Heartfeldt Foundation, which raises awareness on global warming. The foundation has partnered with several DJs including Goldfish, Jay Hardway, and Blond:ish.

Feldt toured with Kygo throughout 2024, and frequently tours around the world.

In 2026, "Calling", his collaboration with Canadian producer Mike Demero and Polish producer Dynoro, became a Canadian radio hit.

== Personal life ==
In 2024, Feldt celebrated his two year wedding anniversary to his wife Michelle. That year, they also became parents to son Florian, who is featured on the cover of Feldt's second album Time After Time, released in early 2025.

== Discography ==
=== Albums ===
==== Studio albums ====
Title	Details
Sunrise	Released: 6 October 2017; Label: Spinnin'; Format: Digital download
Time After Time	Released: 23 May 2025; Label: SF Music, Epic, Sony; Format: Digital download

==== Compilation albums ====
Title	Details
Sunrise to Sunset	Released: 24 November 2017; Label: Spinnin'; Format: Digital download

==== Remix albums ====
Title	Details
After the Sunset	Released: 19 February 2018; Label: Spinnin'; Format: Digital download

=== Extended plays ===
Title	Details
Been a While	Released: 4 March 2016; Label: Spinnin' Deep; Format: Digital download
Magnets	Released: 24 May 2019; Label: Spinnin' Records; Format: Digital download
Home Sweet Home	Released: 27 November 2020; Label: Heartfeldt Records; Format: Digital download

=== Singles ===
List of singles, with selected chart positions, certifications and album name
Title	Year	Peak chart positions										Certifications	Album
Title	Year	NLD	AUS	AUT	BEL	DEN	FRA	GER	SWE	SWI	UK	Certifications	Album
"Bloesem" (with De Hofnar)	2014	—	—	—	—	—	—	—	—	—	—		Non-album singles
"Hot Skin" (with Kav Verhouser)	2014	—	—	—	—	—	—	—	—	—	—		Non-album singles
"Show Me Love" (featuring Kimberly Anne)	2015	15	19	30	11	39	82	39	50	38	4	ARIA: Gold; BPI: Platinum; BVMI: Gold	Non-album singles
"Midnight Hearts" (with The Him featuring Angi3)	2015	—	—	—	—	—	—	—	—	—	—		Non-album singles
"Drive You Home" (with The Him featuring The Donnies The Amys)	2015	—	—	—	—	—	—	—	—	—	—		Non-album singles
"Been a While"	2016	—	—	—	—	—	—	—	—	—	—		Been a While
"Shadows of Love" (featuring Heidi Rojas)	2016	—	—	—	—	—	—	—	—	—	—		Non-album singles
"Summer on You" (with Lucas & Steve featuring Wulf)	2016	4	—	—	—	—	—	—	93	—	—		Non-album singles
"Runaways" (with Deepend featuring Teemu Brunila)	2016	—	—	—	—	—	—	—	89	—	—		Non-album singles
"What About the Love"	2016	—	—	—	—	—	—	—	—	—	—		Non-album singles
"Open Your Eyes" (with Hook n Sling)	2017	—	—	—	—	—	—	—	—	—	—		Non-album singles
"Fade Away" (with Lush & Simon featuring Inna)	2017	—	—	—	—	—	—	—	—	—	—		Sunrise
"Yes" (featuring Akon)	2017	—	—	—	—	—	—	—	86	—	—		Sunrise
"Be My Lover" (with Alex Schulz)	2017	—	—	—	—	—	—	—	—	—	—		Sunrise
"Wishing Well" (featuring Olivia Sebastianelli)	2017	—	—	—	—	—	—	—	—	—	—		Sunrise to Sunset
"Down for Anything" (with Möwe featuring Karra)	2018	—	—	—	—	—	—	—	—	—	—		Non-album singles
"Know You Better" (with Lvndscape featuring Tessa)	2018	—	—	—	—	—	—	—	— (Note: "Know You Better" did not enter the Swedish Singellista Chart, but peaked at number nine on the Swedish Heatseeker Chart.)	—	—		Non-album singles
"Qing Fei De Yi (情非得已)" (with Trouze featuring Derrick Hoh)	2018	—	—	—	—	—	—	—	—	—	—		Non-album singles
"Heaven (Don't Have a Name)" (featuring Jeremy Renner)	2018	—	—	—	—	—	—	—	—	—	—		Non-album singles
"Gold" (featuring Kate Ryan)	2019	—	—	—	27	—	—	—	—	—	—		Non-album singles
"One Day" (with Yves V featuring Rozes)	2019	—	—	—	—	—	—	—	—	—	—		Magnets
"Magnets" (featuring Sophie Simmons)	2019	—	—	—	—	—	—	—	—	—	—		Magnets
"Hide & Seek" (with Srno featuring Joe Housley)	2019	—	—	—	—	—	—	—	—	—	—		Magnets
"Post Malone" (featuring Rani)	2019	16	27	50	81	37	—	46	82	59	10	ARIA: Platinum; BPI: Platinum; BVMI: Gold; IFPI AUT: Gold; IFPI DEN: 2× Platinum; MC: Platinum; RIAA: Gold	Magnets
"Winter Wonderland"	2019	—	—	—	—	—	—	—	—	78	—		Non-album single
"2 Hearts" (with Sigma featuring Gia Koka)	2020	93	—	—	76	—	—	—	—	—	—		Hope
"Hold Me Close" (featuring Ella Henderson)	2020	—	—	—	—	—	—	—	—	—	—		Non-album singles
"Far Away from Home" (with Vize featuring Leony)	2020	—	—	—	—	—	—	—	— (Note: While "Far Away from Home" did not chart at the Swedish Singles Chart, it peaked at number two on the Swedish Heatseeker chart.)	—	—		Non-album singles
"You Should Know" (with Fedde Le Grand featuring Craig Smart)	2020	—	—	—	—	—	—	—	—	—	—		Non-album singles
"Use Your Love" (with The Him featuring Goldford)	2020	—	—	—	—	—	—	—	—	—	—		Non-album singles
"Paradise" (with Stevie Appleton)	2020	—	—	—	—	—	—	—	—	—	—		Non-album singles
"Home Sweet Home" (featuring Alma and Digital Farm Animals)	2020	—	—	—	—	—	—	—	—	—	—		Home Sweet Home
"The Best Days" (with Karma Child featuring Tabitha)	2020	—	—	—	—	—	—	—	—	—	—		Home Sweet Home
"Everything About You" (featuring P<3lly)	2020	—	—	—	—	—	—	—	—	—	—		Home Sweet Home
"Stronger" (featuring Kesha)	2021	—	—	—	—	—	—	—	—	—	—		Non-album singles
"Pick Me Up" (with Sam Fischer)	2021	—	—	—	—	—	—	—	—	—	—		Non-album singles
"Call on Me" (featuring Georgia Ku)	2021	—	—	—	—	—	—	—	—	—	—		Non-album singles
"Follow Me" (with Rita Ora)	2021	66	—	—	—	—	—	—	—	—	—		Non-album singles
"Hate Me" (with Salem Ilese)	2022	—	—	—	—	—	—	—	—	—	—		Non-album singles
"Late Night Feels" (with Monsta X)	2022	—	—	—	—	—	—	—	—	—	—		Non-album singles
"Future in Your Hands" (with Aloe Blacc)	2022	—	—	—	—	—	—	—	—	—	—		Non-album singles
"Better" (with Gavin James)	2022	—	—	—	—	—	—	—	—	—	—		Non-album singles
"How Many Tears" (with Kygo featuring Emily Warren)	2022	—	—	—	—	—	—	—	—	—	—		Non-album singles
"Enough to Drink" (with Cate Downey)	2023	— (Note: "Enough to Drink" did not enter the Dutch Single Top 100, but peaked at number 30 on the Single Tip chart.)	—	—	—	—	—	—	—	—	—		Time After Time
"Crying on the Dancefloor" (with Jonas Blue and Violet Days)	2023	66	—	—	—	—	—	—	—	—	—		Time After Time
"Dance with Somebody" (with Benny Bridges)	2023	—	—	—	—	—	—	—	—	—	—		Time After Time
"House for Kings" (with Tones and I)	2023	—	—	—	—	—	—	—	—	—	—		Time After Time
"Unwanted" (with Martin Jensen and Conor Maynard)	2023	—	—	—	—	—	—	—	—	—	—		Non-album singles
"Dirty Talk" (with CMC$)	2023	—	—	—	—	—	—	—	—	—	—		Non-album singles
"All the Things She Said"	2023	—	—	—	—	—	—	—	—	—	—		Non-album singles
"Memories" (featuring Sofiloud)	2023	—	—	—	—	—	—	—	—	—	—		Time After Time
"You Don't Even Know Me" (with Cheat Codes)	2023	—	—	—	—	—	—	—	—	—	—		Non-album single
"Rest of My Life" (with Jonas Blue and Sadie Van Rose)	2024	—	—	—	—	—	—	—	—	—	—		Together
"Sleep Tonight (This Is the Life)" (with Switch Disco & R3hab)	2024	—	—	—	—	—	—	—	—	—	—		Non-album singles
"Sun Comes Up" (with Timmy Trumpet featuring Joe Taylor & Ekko)	2024	—	—	—	—	—	—	—	—	—	—		Non-album singles
"Mi Amor" (with Jvke and Anitta)	2024	70	—	—	31	—	—	—	—	—	—		Time After Time
"Heart Like Mine" (with Rosa Linn)	2024	—	—	—	—	—	—	—	—	—	—		Time After Time
"I'm Going Out" (with Steve Aoki, Xandra, Zak Abel and Nile Rodgers)	2024	—	—	—	—	—	—	—	—	—	—		Non-album singles
"Ten" (with Joki)	2025	—	—	—	—	—	—	—	—	—	—		Non-album singles
"My Heart Goes" (featuring Oaks)	2025	—	—	—	—	—	—	—	—	—	—		Time After Time
"Follow the Waves" (featuring Caden)	2025	—	—	—	—	—	—	—	—	—	—		Time After Time
"Lonely Tonight" (featuring Justin Jesso & Parson James)	2025	—	—	—	—	—	—	—	—	—	—		Time After Time
"Runaway Train" (featuring RuthAnne)	2025	—	—	—	—	—	—	—	—	—	—		Non-album singles
"Calling" (with Dynoro and Mike Demero)	2025	—	—	—	—	—	—	—	—	—	—		Non-album singles
"Cheap Champagne" (featuring Sophie Stray)	2025	—	—	—	—	—	—	—	—	—	—		Non-album singles
"Like You Do" (with Tribbs, Andy Dust featuring Dotter)	2025	—	—	—	—	—	—	—	—	—	—		Non-album singles
"Sinners" (with Deepend)	2025	—	—	—	—	—	—	—	—	—	—		Non-album singles
"Pretender" (with Kshmr)	2025	—	—	—	—	—	—	—	—	—	—		Non-album singles
"Hey Son" (with Vize, Aloe Blacc and MC4D)	2025	—	—	—	38	—	—	—	—	—	—		Non-album singles
"In Pieces Again" (with Conor Maynard)	2026	—	—	—	—	—	—	—	—	—	—		Non-album singles
"Sinners on the Moon" (with Justin Jesso)	2026	—	—	—	—	—	—	—	—	—	—		
"Lost in Desire" (with Tame)	2026	—	—	—	—	—	—	—	—	—	—		
"—" denotes a recording that did not chart or was not released in that territory.

=== Other charted songs ===
==== As lead artist ====
List of other charted songs as lead artist, with selected chart positions, showing year released and album name
Title	Year	Peak chart positions	Album
Title	Year	CZR	Album
"Time After Time"	2025	3	Time After Time

=== Remixes ===
- 2014: I Am Oak - "On Trees and Birds and Fire" (Sam Feldt & Bloombox Remix)
- 2017: Sean Paul featuring Dua Lipa - "No Lie" (Sam Feldt Remix)
- 2018: Shaun featuring Conor Maynard – "Way Back Home" (Sam Feldt Edit)
- 2019: AJ Mitchell featuring Ava Max – "Slow Dance" (Sam Feldt Remix)
- 2019: James Blunt – "The Truth" (Sam Feldt Remix)
- 2019: Ed Sheeran featuring Camila Cabello and Cardi B – "South of the Border" (Sam Feldt Remix)
- 2020: Möwe featuring Conor Maynard and Rani – "Talk to Me" (Sam Feldt Edit)
- 2020: Jaymes Young – "Happiest Year" (Sam Feldt Remix)
- 2020: JeeCee – "Milavain" (Sam Feldt Edit)
- 2020: Dermot Kennedy – "Giants" (Sam Feldt Remix)
- 2021: Sam Fischer and Demi Lovato – "What Other People Say" (Sam Feldt Remix)
- 2021: Duncan Laurence – "Arcade" (Sam Feldt Remix)
- 2021: Calum Scott - "Rise" (Sam Feldt Remix)
- 2022: Jonah Kagen - "Catching A Dream" (Sam Feldt Remix)
- 2022: Becky Hill & Galantis - "Run" (Sam Feldt Remix)
- 2022: Sam Ryder - "Space Man" (Sam Feldt Remix)
- 2022: Charlie Puth featuring Jungkook - "Left And Right" (Sam Feldt Remix)
- 2022: Craig David & Galantis - "DNA" (Sam Feldt Remix)
- 2022: P!nk - "Never Gonna Not Dance Again" (Sam Feldt Remix)
- 2023: Switch Disco featuring Ella Henderson - "React" (Sam Feldt Remix)
- 2023: R3hab & Sash! featuring Inna - "Rock My Body" (Sam Feldt Remix)
- 2023: Conor Maynard - "Storage" (Sam Feldt Remix)
