= Rag'n'Bone Man discography =

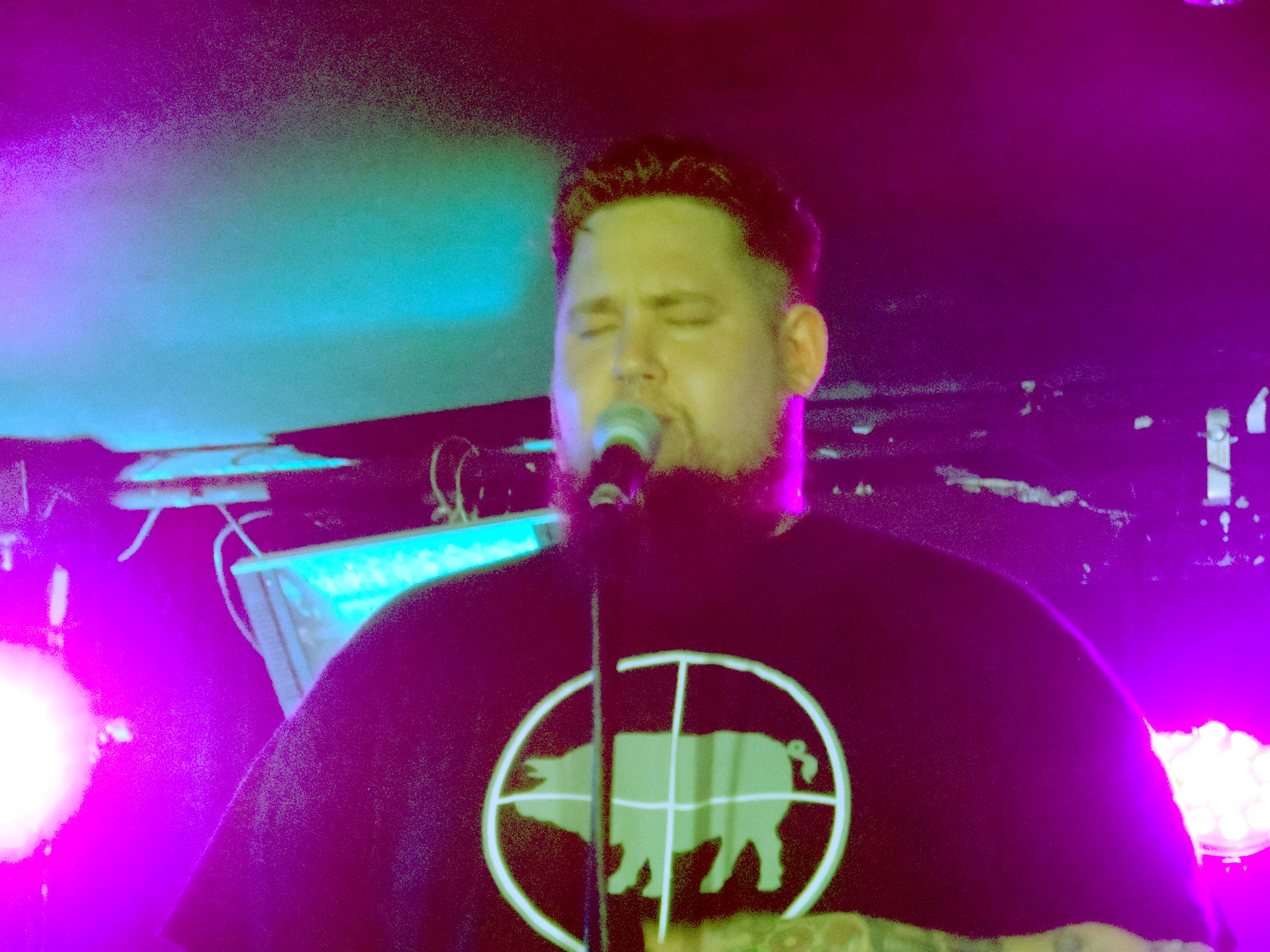
- Rag'n'Bone Man at the 2015 Dot to Dot Festival in Manchester
- Studio albums: 3
- EPs: 5
- Singles: 19

The discography of Rag'n'Bone Man, an English singer, consists of three studio albums, five extended plays and nineteen singles.

== Studio albums ==
Title	Details	Peak chart positions										Sales	Certifications
Title	Details	UK	AUS	AUT	BEL (Fl)	FRA	GER	NLD	NZ	SWI	US	Sales	Certifications
Human	Released: 10 February 2017; Label: Columbia; Format: CD, DL, LP	1	3	4	1	1	2	1	3	1	117	UK: 1,200,000; FRA: 310,000	BPI: 4× Platinum; ARIA: Gold; BEA: Gold; BVMI: Platinum; IFPI AUT: Gold; IFPI SWI: 2× Platinum; NVPI: Gold; RMNZ: Gold; SNEP: 3× Platinum
Life by Misadventure	Released: 7 May 2021; Label: Columbia; Format: CD, DL, LP	1	4	7	7	24	5	5	23	3	— (Note: Life by Misadventure did not enter the US Billboard 200, but peaked at number 11 on the US Heatseekers Albums Chart.)		BPI: Gold
What Do You Believe In?	Released: 18 October 2024; Label: Columbia; Format: CD, DL, LP	3	—	—	117	101	37	—	—	10	—		

== Extended plays ==
Title	Details	Peak chart positions					Certifications
Title	Details	UK	AUT	BEL (Fl)	GER	SWI	Certifications
Bluestown	Released: 11 November 2012; Label: Rumbustious Records; Format: Digital download, 12" EP	—	—	—	—	—	
Dog 'n' Bone (with Leaf Dog)	Released: 26 April 2013; Label: High Focus Records; Format: Digital download	—	—	—	—	—	
Put That Soul on Me	Released: 8 July 2014; Label: High Focus Records; Format: Digital download	—	—	—	—	—	
Wolves	Released: 24 October 2014; Label: Best Laid Plans Records; Format: Digital download, CD, 12" EP	24	69	88	44	61	BPI: Gold
Disfigured	Released: 6 March 2015; Label: Best Laid Plans Records; Format: Digital download, CD, 12" EP	—	—	—	—	—	
"—" denotes an album that did not chart or was not released in that territory.

== Singles ==
=== As lead artist ===
Title	Year	Peak positions										Certification	Album
Title	Year	UK	AUS	AUT	BEL (FL)	FRA	GER	NLD	NZ	SWI	US	Certification	Album
"Nobody" (with Leaf Dog)	2013	—	—	—	—	—	—	—	—	—	—		Dog 'n' Bone
"Hard Came the Rain"	2015	— (Note: "Hard Came the Rain" did not enter the UK Singles Chart, but peaked at number one on the UK Physical Singles Chart.)	—	—	—	—	—	—	—	—	—		Disfigured
"Healed"	2016	—	—	—	—	—	—	—	—	—	—		Human
"Human"	2016	2	17	1	1	2	1	14	11	1	74	BPI: 4× Platinum; ARIA: 2× Platinum; BEA: 2× Platinum; BVMI: 2× Platinum; IFPI AUT: Platinum; IFPI SWI: 5× Platinum; NVPI: Gold; RIAA: 3× Platinum; RMNZ: 4× Platinum; SNEP: Diamond	Human
"Skin"	2017	13	87	7	13	4	10	33	— (Note: "Skin" did not enter the NZ Top 40 Singles Chart, but peaked at number four on the NZ Heatseeker Singles Chart.)	6	—	BPI: 2× Platinum; ARIA: Gold; BEA: Gold; BVMI: Platinum; IFPI AUT: Platinum; IFPI SWI: 2× Platinum; RMNZ: 2× Platinum; SNEP: Diamond	Human
"As You Are"	2017	— (Note: "As You Are" did not enter the UK Singles Chart, but peaked at number 63 on the UK Single Sales Chart.)	—	—	— (Note: "As You Are" did not enter the Ultratop 50 chart, but peaked at number three on the Flemish Ultratip chart.)	—	—	—	—	—	—	BPI: Silver	Human
"Grace (We All Try)"	2017	83	—	—	—	79	—	—	—	—	—	BPI: Silver; SNEP: Gold	Human
"Broken People" (with Logic)	2017	—	— (Note: "Broken People" did not enter the Australian ARIA Singles Chart but peaked at number 38 on the ARIA Digital Track Chart.)	—	—	39	— (Note: "Broken People" did not enter the German Singles Chart, but peaked at number 10 on the Deutsche Single Trend Chart.)	—	— (Note: "Broken People" did not enter the NZ Top 40 Singles Chart, but peaked at number seven on the NZ Heatseeker Singles Chart.)	62	— (Note: "Broken People" did not enter the Billboard Hot 100, but peaked at number 44 on the Digital Song Sales chart.)		Bright: The Album
"Don't Set The World On Fire"	2018	— (Note: "Don't Set The World On Fire" did not enter the UK Singles Chart, but peaked at number 10 on the UK Physical Singles Chart.)	—	—	—	—	—	—	—	—	—		Non-album single
"Giant" (with Calvin Harris)	2019	2	19	8	1	18	6	8	20	5	—	BPI: 3× Platinum; ARIA: 3× Platinum; BVMI: Gold; IFPI AUT: Platinum; RMNZ: 2× Platinum; SNEP: Platinum	96 Months
"All You Ever Wanted"	2021	29	—	—	— (Note: "All You Ever Wanted" did not enter the Ultratop 50 chart, but peaked at number two on the Flemish Ultratip chart.)	—	— (Note: "All You Ever Wanted" did not enter the German Singles Chart, but peaked at number 9 on the Deutsche Single Trend Chart.)	— (Note: "All You Ever Wanted" did not enter the Netherlands' Single Top 100 but peaked on the Netherlands' Airplay Chart at number 24.)	— (Note: "All You Ever Wanted" did not enter the NZ Top 40 Singles Chart, but peaked at number 25 on the NZ Hot Singles Chart.)	—	—	BPI: Gold	Life by Misadventure
"Anywhere Away from Here" (with Pink)	2021	9	43	—	— (Note: "Anywhere Away from Here" did not enter the Ultratop 50 chart, but peaked at number 23 on the Flemish Ultratip chart.)	—	— (Note: "Anywhere Away from Here" did not enter the German Singles Chart, but peaked at number 1 on the Deutsche Single Trend Chart.)	— (Note: "Anywhere Away from Here" did not enter the Netherlands' Single Top 100 but peaked on the Netherlands' Single Tip Chart at number 19.)	— (Note: "Anywhere Away from Here" did not enter the NZ Top 40 Singles Chart, but peaked at number eight on the NZ Hot Singles Chart.)	56	— (Note: "Anywhere Away from Here" did not enter the Billboard Hot 100, but peaked at number 12 on the Digital Song Sales chart.)	BPI: Platinum; RMNZ: Gold	Life by Misadventure
"Alone"	2021	— (Note: "Alone" did not enter the UK Singles Chart, but peaked at number 29 on the UK Single Sales Chart.)	—	—	—	—	—	— (Note: "Alone" did not enter the Netherlands' Single Top 100 but peaked on the Netherlands' Airplay Chart at number 21.)	—	—	—		Life by Misadventure
"Circles" (featuring Ocean Wisdom)	2022	—	—	—	—	—	—	—	— (Note: "Circles" did not enter the NZ Top 40 Singles Chart, but peaked at number 30 on the NZ Hot Singles Chart.)	—	—		Non-album single
"Lovers in a Past Life" (with Calvin Harris)	2024	13	—	—	30	—	—	81	— (Note: "Lovers in a Past Life" did not enter the NZ Top 40 Singles Chart, but peaked at number 11 on the NZ Hot Singles Chart.)	—	—	BPI: Gold	96 Months
"What Do You Believe In?"	2024	— (Note: "What Do You Believe In?" did not enter the UK Singles Chart, but peaked at number 35 on the UK Single Sales Chart.)	—	—	—	—	—	—	—	—	—		What Do You Believe In?
"Rush of Blood"	2024	— (Note: "Rush of Blood" did not enter the UK Singles Chart, but peaked at number 32 on the UK Single Sales Chart.)	—	—	—	—	—	—	—	—	—		What Do You Believe In?
"Pocket"	2024	— (Note: "Pocket" did not enter the UK Singles Chart, but peaked at number 92 on the UK Single Sales Chart.)	—	—	—	—	—	—	—	—	—		What Do You Believe In?
"Whisper" (with Max Chapman and Mischief)	2025	—	—	—	—	—	—	—	—	—	—		Non-album single
"Good Life" (featuring WizTheMc)	2025	—	—	—	—	—	—	—	—	—	—		The Bad Guys 2
"Time to Love"	2025	—	—	—	—	—	—	—	—	—	—		Non-album single
"—" denotes a single that did not chart or was not released in that territory.

=== As featured artist ===
Title	Year	Peak chart positions										Certifications	Album
Title	Year	UK	UK Indie	BEL (FL)	CAN DL	EU	IRE	NL	NZ Hot	SCO	US DL	Certifications	Album
"She" (Stig of the Dump featuring Rag'n'Bone Man)	2016	—	—	—	—	—	—	—	—	—	—		Kubrick
"The Apprentice" (Gorillaz featuring Rag'n'Bone Man, Zebra Katz & Ray BLK)	2017	— (Note: "The Apprentice" did not enter the UK Singles Chart, but peaked at number 97 on the UK Singles Sales Chart.)	—	—	—	—	—	—	—	—	—		Humanz
"Run" (Bugzy Malone featuring Rag'n'Bone Man)	2018	55	6	—	—	—	84	—	—	—	—	BPI: Silver	B.Inspired
"Standard" (Foreign Beggars featuring Rag'n'Bone Man & Bangsy)	2018	—	—	—	—	—	—	—	—	—	—		2 2 KARMA
"Photographs" (Professor Green featuring Rag'n'Bone Man)	2018	79	—	— (Note: "Photographs" did not enter the Ultratop 50 chart, but peaked at number thirty-nine on the Flemish Ultratip Chart.)	—	—	—	—	—	—	—		Non-album single
"Times Like These" (as part of Live Lounge Allstars)	2020	1	—	— (Note: "Times Like These" did not enter the Ultratop 50 chart, but peaked at number thirty-nine on the Flemish Ultratip Chart.)	8	2	64	15	5	1	18	BPI: Silver	Non-album single
"Nights Like These" (Rudimental featuring Rag'n'Bone Man)	2025	65	—	—	—	—	—	—	—	—	—		RUDIM3NTAL
"—" denotes a recording that did not chart or was not released in that territory.

=== Promotional singles ===
Title	Year	Album
"Wolves"	2016	Human
"Fall in Love Again"	2021	Life by Misadventure

== Other charted songs ==
Title	Year	Peak positions					Album
Title	Year	UK Sales	UK R&B	FRA Down.	SCO	SVK Air.	Album
"Bitter End"	2017	—	37	—	—	—	Human
"Grace"	2017	—	—	78	—	—	Human
"Ego"	2017	92	—	—	90	—	Human
"Lay My Body Down"	2017	—	—	—	—	81	Human
"Crossfire"	2021	62	—	—	—	—	Life by Misadventure
"Put a Little Hurt on Me"	2024	82	—	—	—	—	What Do You Believe In?
"—" denotes a recording that did not chart or was not released in that territory.

== Guest appearances ==
Title	Year	Other artists	Album
"Same Old Song"	2012	As "Rag n' Bones aka Rory Graham"	Joan Armatrading Presents Local Talent
"Mask"	2018	Jam Baxter, OG Rootz	Touching Scenes
"Whoops"	2018	Dirty Dike, Jam Baxter	Acrylic Snail

== Songwriting discography ==
Title	Year	Artist(s)	Album	Written with:
"Surrender"	2017	Paloma Faith	The Architect	Paloma Faith, Jonathan Green, Johnny "Ghostwriter" Harris
