= Sprain Your Tapedeck =

EP by Edan
- Released: October 14, 2001
- Genre: Hip-hop
- Length: 19:44
- Label: Lewis Recordings
- Producer: Edan

Edan chronology
Fast Rap (2001)	Sprain Your Tapedeck (2001)	Primitive Plus (2002)

Sprain Your Tapedeck is the first EP by American hip-hop musician Edan. It was released via Lewis Recordings on October 14, 2001.

== Critical reception ==
Professional ratings
Review scores
Source	Rating
AllMusic	3/5 stars
Pitchfork	7.4/10

Matt Kallman of Pitchfork wrote, "Combining the hilarity of his Biscuithead 12-inch debut (1999's 'Sing It, Shitface') with the nostalgia of the recent Critical Beatdown-era tribute track 'Ultra 88', this record is a retardedly good time." Stanton Swihart of AllMusic called the EP "a continuation of the Edan aesthetic, part wild-style throwback and part future Dada, where old-school 808 drum loops mingle with the rapper's one-of-a-kind b-boy world view."

The Wire included it on the "2003 Rewind" list.

== Track listing ==
No.	Title	Length
1.	"Let's Be Friends"	2:33
2.	"MC's Smoke Crack"	3:42
3.	"Beautiful Food"	2:23
4.	"Run That Shit!"	4:14
5.	"Clinical Rhymes" (featuring Skillz Ferguson)	3:19
6.	"Schooly D Knew the Time"	3:34
Total length:		19:44
