= Beauty and the Beat (Edan album) =

Studio album by Edan
- Released: March 29, 2005
- Genre: Hip-hop; psychedelic rap
- Length: 34:00
- Label: Lewis Recordings
- Producer: Edan

Edan chronology
Primitive Plus (2002)	Beauty and the Beat (2005)	Echo Party (2009)

Singles from Beauty and the Beat
- 1. "I See Colours" Released: 2004; 2. "Fumbling Over Words That Rhyme" / "Beauty" Released: 2005

Beauty and the Beat is the second studio album by American hip-hop musician Edan. It was released via Lewis Recordings on March 29, 2005. It features guest appearances from Insight, Percee P, Mr. Lif, and Dagha. It peaked at number 40 on the UK Independent Albums Chart, as well as number 37 on the UK R&B Albums Chart.

In 2013, NME placed it at number 392 on the "500 Greatest Albums of All Time" list. While in 2015, Fact placed it at number 30 on the "100 Best Indie Hip-Hop Records of All Time" list.

== Critical reception ==
Professional ratings
Aggregate scores
Source	Rating
Metacritic	85/100
Review scores
Source	Rating
AllMusic	4.5/5 stars
Entertainment Weekly	A−
HipHopDX	4.5/5
Mojo	4/5 stars
NME	8/10
Pitchfork	8.8/10
Q	3/5 stars
Stylus Magazine	A−
Uncut	4/5 stars
URB	4.5/5 stars

At Metacritic, which assigns a weighted average score out of 100 to reviews from mainstream critics, Beauty and the Beat received an average score of 85, based on 18 reviews, indicating "universal acclaim".

Peter Macia of Pitchfork commented that "The gravity of Edan's lyrics and voice on Beauty and the Beat is perhaps its most surprising element" and "[Edan has] gone from a brainiac prankster to the Borges of rap." Nathan Rabin of The A.V. Club said, "the album's brevity is just another old-fashioned value from a rapper-producer-visionary who doesn't need a whole lot of space to make a big statement." Nick Follett of XLR8R called it "one of the best and most original records to come out this decade."

In 2013, NME placed it at number 392 on the "500 Greatest Albums of All Time" list. In 2015, Fact placed it at number 30 on the "100 Best Indie Hip-Hop Records of All Time" list.

== Cover ==
The album cover is based on that of 1968 single "Io Per Lei" by Italian band I Camaleonti, with the various faces and record company logo covering the ones seen on the original cover.

== Track listing ==
No.	Title	Length
1.	"Polite Meeting (Intro)"	2:16
2.	"Funky Voltron" (featuring Insight)	2:16
3.	"I See Colours"	2:30
4.	"Fumbling Over Words That Rhyme"	2:55
5.	"Murder Mystery"	2:02
6.	"Torture Chamber" (featuring Percee P)	3:12
7.	"Making Planets" (featuring Mr. Lif)	2:54
8.	"Time Out (Segue)"	1:07
9.	"Rock and Roll" (featuring Dagha)	3:16
10.	"Beauty"	3:20
11.	"The Science of the Two" (featuring Insight)	3:33
12.	"Smile"	2:15
13.	"Promised Land"	2:24
Total length:		34:00

Japanese edition bonus track
No.	Title	Length
14.	"Bonus Rehearsal"	19:27

== Charts ==
Chart (2005)	Peak position
UK Independent Albums (OCC)	40
UK R&B Albums (OCC)	37
