= Dusty (Homeboy Sandman album) =

Studio album by Homeboy Sandman
- Released: October 18, 2019
- Studio: Sung Moon Recordings (Buffalo, NY)
- Genre: Hip-hop
- Length: 34:49
- Label: Mello Music Group
- Producers: Michael Tolle (exec.); RTNC

Homeboy Sandman chronology
Humble Pi (2018)	Dusty (2019)	Don't Feed the Monster (2020)

Dusty is the ninth studio album by American rapper Homeboy Sandman. It was released on October 18, 2019, through Mello Music Group with distribution via The Orchard. The recording sessions took place at Sung Moon Recordings in Buffalo, New York. The album was produced by Mono En Stereo. It features guest appearances from Quelle Chris and Your Old Droog.

== Music videos ==
Music video for "Far Out", directed by Rob Shaw & Bent Image Lab, was premiered at BrooklynVegan on September 25, 2019. Music video for "Noteworthy", directed by HaiTao Wu, was released on October 17, 2019. Music video for "Live & Breath", directed by Nate Peracciny, was released on January 29, 2020. Music video for "Name" was directed by Paul Stevenson.

== Critical reception ==
Professional ratings
Aggregate scores
Source	Rating
Metacritic	72/100
Review scores
Source	Rating
AllMusic	4/5 stars
Pitchfork	6.1/10
RapReviews	8/10

Dusty garnered positive reviews from music critics. At Metacritic, which assigns a normalized rating out of 100 to reviews from mainstream critics, the album received an average score of 72, based on 4 reviews.

AllMusic writer Paul Simpson praised Mono En Stereo's soundscape of "laid-back, ambling jazz and funk grooves" for complimenting Sandman's "conversational, matter-of-fact rhymes" throughout the album, concluding that "Dusty is another winning set of pointed observations from Sandman, who effortlessly unloads his thoughts without seeming like a burden on the listener." Patrick Taylor of RapReviews found Mono's use of live instrumentation samples "effortless and low-key" to make the production feel organic and Sandman sounding more "loose and free" to quickly deliver "engaging and clever" lyrics, concluding that "Dusty goes down as smooth as an ice cold beer on a warm day, and should not be missed."

== Track listing ==
No.	Title	Length
1.	"Morning Yawn"	0:59
2.	"Far Out"	3:05
3.	"Name"	2:55
4.	"Noteworthy"	2:32
5.	"Easy"	3:08
6.	"Yes Iyah"	4:25
7.	"Every Four Years"	0:16
8.	"Step Inside"	2:24
9.	"Picture on the Wall"	3:17
10.	"Pussy"	1:59
11.	"Live & Breath"	2:23
12.	"Wondering Why"	2:42
13.	"Lookout" (featuring Quelle Chris and Your Old Droog)	2:42
14.	"Tres Bon"	0:29
15.	"Always"	1:33
16.	"Lookout (Remix)" (featuring Kurious and Aesop Rock)	2:42
Total length:		34:49

== Personnel ==
- Angel Del Villar II – main artist
- Gavin Christopher Tennille – featured artist (track 13)
- Your Old Droog – featured artist (track 13)
- Mono En Stereo – producer
- Andrew Esposito – additional percussion, recording, mixing
- Ryan Bress – recording, mixing
- Alejandro "Sosa" Tello – mastering
- Sarah Mattmiller – cover art
- Lisa Wollter – art direction
- Austin Hart – layout
- Johnny Navarro – photography
- Michael Tolle – executive producer
