= Primitive Plus =

Studio album by Edan
- Released: March 19, 2002
- Genre: Hip-hop
- Length: 57:18
- Label: Lewis Recordings
- Producer: Edan

Edan chronology
Sprain Your Tapedeck (2001)	Primitive Plus (2002)	Beauty and the Beat (2005)

Singles from Primitive Plus
- 1. "Sing It, Shitface" Released: 1999; 2. "Mic Manipulator" / "Humble Magnificent" Released: 2001

Primitive Plus is the official debut studio album by American hip-hop musician Edan. It was released via Lewis Recordings on March 19, 2002. It peaked at number 44 on the UK Independent Albums Chart.

== Critical reception ==
Professional ratings
Review scores
Source	Rating
AllMusic	4.5/5 stars
The A.V. Club	favorable
Exclaim!	favorable
RapReviews.com	7.5/10
Spin	8/10

Stanton Swihart of AllMusic described the album as "a wild, weird, instantly left-field rap masterpiece from one seriously bugged-out, innovative loner." Thomas Quinlan of Exclaim! stated that it "embraces the late '80s/early '90s of hip-hop, with old school beats and battle rhymes (the Primitive), while at the same time shaking hands with new school lyricism and space age effects (the Plus)." Nathan Rabin of The A.V. Club wrote, "One of the year's most promising debuts, Primitive Plus makes the beats of yesterday and the flows of today sound like the hip-hop of tomorrow."

== Track listing ==
No.	Title	Length
1.	"83 Wildin"	2:24
2.	"One Man Arsenal"	3:40
3.	"Humble Magnificent"	3:00
4.	"Migraine (Almighty Dust Mix)"	3:26
5.	"Key Bored"	1:36
6.	"Emcees Smoke Crack"	3:41
7.	"#1 Hit Record"	1:59
8.	"Syllable Practice (Original)"	3:02
9.	"Good Evening"	0:29
10.	"Rapperfection" (featuring Mr. Lif)	3:25
11.	"Mic Manipulator"	3:52
12.	"Primitive Plus"	2:18
13.	"You Suck" (featuring Father Time)	3:47
14.	"Run That Shit!"	4:13
15.	"Ultra '88 (Tribute)"	2:02
16.	"Syllable Practice (12" Version)"	3:07
17.	"A.E.O.C."	3:03
18.	"Sing It, Shitface"	7:37
Total length:		57:18

== Charts ==
Chart (2002)	Peak position
UK Independent Albums (OCC)	44
