= Kindness for Weakness =

Studio album by Homeboy Sandman
- Released: May 6, 2016
- Genre: Hip-hop
- Length: 39:10
- Label: Stones Throw
- Producer: Jonwayne; Georgia Anne Muldrow; 2 Hungry Bros.; Until the Ribbon Breaks; Large Professor; Edan; RJD2; Nin Vibe; V-Man; Eric Lau; Paul White; El RTNC; J57

Homeboy Sandman chronology
Hallways (2014)	Kindness for Weakness (2016)	Veins (2017)

Kindness for Weakness is a studio album by American rapper Homeboy Sandman. It was released by Stones Throw Records on May 6, 2016. Music videos were created for "Talking (Bleep)", "Nonbelievers", and "Eyes".

== Critical reception ==
Professional ratings
Review scores
Source	Rating
Robert Christgau	A−
HipHopDX	4.0/5
Pitchfork	6.7/10
Spectrum Culture	3.75/5
Spin	8/10

Marcus J. Moore of Pitchfork gave the album a 6.7 out of 10, writing, "The album feels resolute, though it occasionally suffers from brief lapses that derail the proceedings."

HipHopDX named it one of the "Most Slept-On Rap Albums of 2016".

== Track listing ==
No.	Title	Producer(s)	Length
1.	"Heart Sings"	Jonwayne	2:46
2.	"Eyes"	Georgia Anne Muldrow	3:54
3.	"Real New York" (featuring I Am Many)	2 Hungry Bros.	2:22
4.	"Seam by Seam" (featuring Until the Ribbon Breaks)	Until the Ribbon Breaks	3:31
5.	"It's Cold" (featuring Steve Arrington)	Large Professor	3:50
6.	"Talking (Bleep)"	Edan	3:11
7.	"Gumshoe"	RJD2	1:59
8.	"Keep It Real" (featuring Mystro)	Nin Vibe	2:37
9.	"Earth, Wind, Fire, Water" (featuring Yu, Tah Phrum Duh Bush, and Shad)	V-Man	3:03
10.	"Funhouse"	Eric Lau	0:22
11.	"Sly Fox"	Paul White	2:00
12.	"God"	Paul White	3:47
13.	"Nonbelievers"	EL RTNC	2:05
14.	"Speak Truth" (featuring Kurious, Breeze Brewin', and Aesop Rock)	J57	3:44
Total length:			39:10

The record label's website provides a link to a "Bonus Track" [entitled] "Kindness for Weakness Out Now" '
