= Don't Feed the Monster =

Studio album by Homeboy Sandman
- Released: October 16, 2020
- Genre: Hip-hop
- Length: 54:15
- Label: Mello Music Group
- Producer: Michael Tolle (exec.); Homeboy Sandman (exec.); Quelle Chris (also exec.)

Homeboy Sandman chronology
Dusty (2019)	Don't Feed the Monster (2020)	Anjelitu (2021)

Don't Feed the Monster is the tenth studio album by American rapper Homeboy Sandman. It was released on October 16, 2020, through Mello Music Group with distribution via The Orchard. Production was handled entirely by Quelle Chris, who is featured on the album as well.

== Music videos ==
The Pavel Buryak-directed music video for the song "Monument" won UK Music Video Award for Best Hip Hop/Grime/Rap Video at the 2021 UK Music Video Awards. The music video for "Don't Look Down", directed by Robert Mayer a.k.a. Photo Rob, won Best Foreign Documentary at the 2022 Rome Film Awards.

== Critical reception ==
Professional ratings
Review scores
Source	Rating
AllMusic	4/5 stars
RapReviews	7.5/10
Robert Christgau	(2-star Honorable Mention)

Don't Feed the Monster was listed in NPR's top 50 albums of 2020. AllMusic selected the project in their Best Rap & Hip-Hop Albums of 2020 and rating the album 4 out of 5 stars. Don't Feed the Monster received critical praise from Patrick Taylor of RapReviews hailing it, "yet another solid Homeboy Sandman release and a fitting album for 2020". Veteran critic Robert Christgau highlighted two songs, "Trauma" and "Alone Again", with the words: "includes two of Homeboy's most interesting rhymes ever, but his collaborator Quelle Chris has never had enough interesting in him".

== Track listing ==
No.	Title	Length
1.	"Trauma"	3:05
2.	"Extinction"	4:59
3.	"Stress"	3:36
4.	"Hello Dancer" (featuring Quelle Chris)	2:26
5.	"Waiting on My Girl"	4:01
6.	"Shorty Heights"	3:04
7.	"Scare You"	3:41
8.	"Don't Look Down"	3:42
9.	"Monument"	4:52
10.	"Triple Warmer"	2:29
11.	"Biters"	3:40
12.	"Alone Again"	4:00
13.	"Walk by Faith"	4:47
14.	"Gestation"	2:40
15.	"Straight"	3:13
Total length:		54:15

== Personnel ==
- Angel Del Villar II – rap vocals, executive producer
- Gavin Christopher Tennille – rap vocals (track 4), producer, executive producer
- Alejandro "Sosa" Tello Jr. – mixing, mastering
- Michael Tolle – executive producer
- Robert P. Cohen – cover photo
- Mitch Lagrow – designer
