= Humble Pi =

Studio album by Homeboy Sandman & Edan
- Released: October 26, 2018
- Genre: Alternative hip-hop
- Length: 22:57
- Label: Stones Throw Records
- Producer: Edan

Homeboy Sandman chronology
Veins (2017)	Humble Pi (2018)	Dusty (2019)

Edan chronology
Echo Party (2009)	Humble Pi (2018)

Humble Pi is a collaborative studio album by American rappers Homeboy Sandman and Edan. It was released on Stones Throw Records on October 26, 2018.

== Music videos ==
Music videos were created for "Grim Seasons", "#Neverusetheinternetagain", and "The Gut".

== Critical reception ==
Professional ratings
Review scores
Source	Rating
AllMusic	4/5 stars
Bandcamp Daily	favorable
Pitchfork	6.8/10
RapReviews	9/10
Vice	A−

Paul Simpson of AllMusic said, "Edan's fetish for echo and obscure acid rock records is as evident as ever through his mind-bending productions, and Sandman's effortlessly complex lyrics are typically biting as well as insightful." Dean Van Nguyen of Pitchfork commented that "Humble Pi might be thin, but there's enough here to spark hope that this is the origin point of Sandman and Edan's cracked journey, and not the final destination." Nate Patrin of Bandcamp Daily described it as "a short but vivid world building record, the remnants of old places and past lives still standing in defiance of hyper development."

"Grim Seasons" was placed at number 2 on Stereogum's "5 Best Songs of the Week" list on August 3, 2018.

== Track listing ==
No.	Title	Length
1.	"Grim Seasons"	3:43
2.	"The Gut"	3:45
3.	"Rock & Roll Indian Dance"	3:10
4.	"Unwavering Mind"	3:00
5.	"That Moment When..."	3:03
6.	"#Neverusetheinternetagain"	3:37
7.	"Evolution of (Sand)Man"	2:39
Total length:		22:57
