= Julian Fane (musician) =

Canadian musician

- Origin: Canada
- Years active: 2004 - present
- Labels: Lewis Recordings Planet Mu
- Members: Julian Fane

Julian Fane is an electronic producer, vocalist and DJ based in New York. He is originally from Vancouver, British Columbia where he came to the attention of the Planet Mu imprint. Two albums Special Forces (2004) and Our New Quarters (2007) followed but for the past few years he's recorded primarily for film and TV. His ethereal perspective evokes the sounds of Sigur Rós and The Flaming Lips whilst his musical range compares to that of Boards Of Canada and Mercury Rev, a true reflection of his skills behind the big screen.

In 2013 Julian signed with Lewis Recordings. His release Racer is a nine-track album with hints of the aforementioned Sigur Rós and Boards Of Canada, Kraftwerk and Jai Paul.

Julian provided the keyboards on the "Daylight For Delay" EP by Astoria.

== Discography ==
=== Albums ===
- Racer (Lewis Recordings 2013)
- Special Forces (Planet Mu, 2004)
- Our New Quarters (Planet Mu, 2007)
