= Rag'n'Bone Man =

British singer (born 1985)

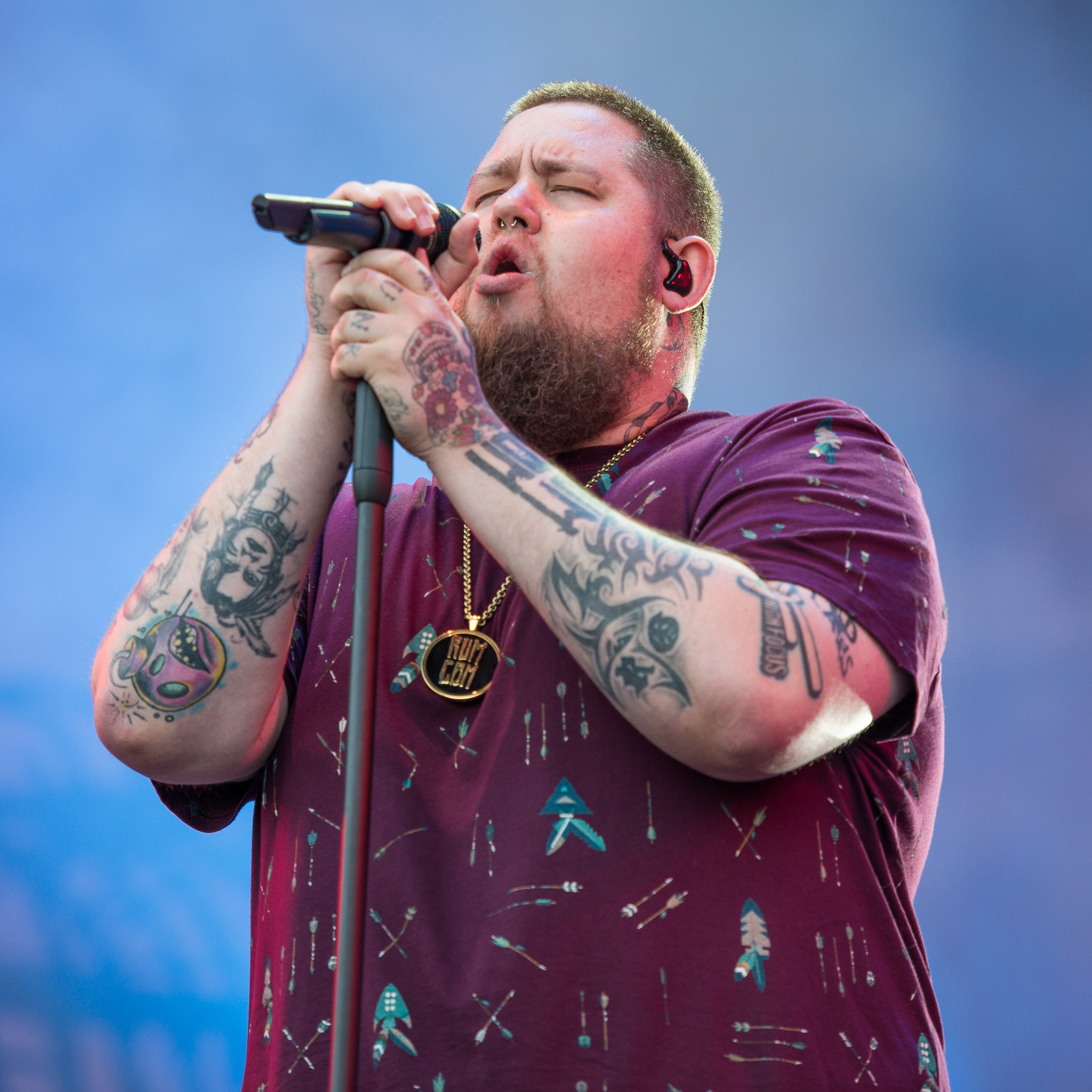
- Rag'n'Bone Man performing at Rock Im Park, June 2017

Background information
- Also known as: Rag 'n' Bonez; Moon
- Born: Rory Charles Graham; 29 January 1985 (age 41); Eastbourne, East Sussex, England
- Genres: Neo blues; pop; soul
- Occupations: Singer; songwriter
- Years active: 2008–present
- Labels: Columbia; High Focus
- Partner: Beth Rouy (m. 2019; div. 2020) Zoe Beardsall (m. 2024)
- Website: ragnboneman.com

Rory Charles Graham (born 29 January 1985), known professionally as Rag'n'Bone Man, is an English singer. He is known for his baritone voice. His first hit single, "Human", was released in 2016, and his first album Human was released in 2017. The album became the fastest selling debut album by a male in the UK for the decade and has since achieved 4× Platinum certification. At the 2017 Brit Awards, he was named British Breakthrough Act and received the Critics' Choice Award. He also received a further Brit Award for Best British Single with the title track, in 2018.

After the album's success, Graham performed at headline shows and festivals in several countries and collaborated with several artists from different genres, including Bugzy Malone, Logic, and Calvin Harris. In May 2021, Rag'n'Bone Man released his second studio album, Life by Misadventure. It debuted at number one on the UK Albums Chart and spent seven weeks in the top 10, making it the fastest-selling album by a solo artist in 2021 and gaining Gold certification in the UK.

== Early life ==
Rory Charles Graham was born on 29 January 1985, in Eastbourne, East Sussex He has a younger half-sister. He attended the Ringmer Secondary School in Ringmer, from which he was expelled and then enrolled at Uckfield College in Uckfield. At 15, he began MCing with a drum and bass crew using the handle Rag 'N' Bonez, inspired by watching repeats of the BBC sitcom Steptoe and Son. While at school, he was part of a group of youths supported by The Prince's Trust which developed a community project which involved painting and gardening in Crowborough. He still supports the local Brighton and Hove Albion football team.

== Career ==
Graham moved to Brighton. During this time, a friend, known as GI3MO, formed the rap group Rum Committee and invited him to join them. Graham started performing at Slip-jam B, where he met people who helped him start his career. Over the next few years, they supported hip hop artists Pharoahe Monch and KRS-One at Brighton's Concorde 2, and released their own album titled Boozetown (2012) through Bandcamp and other digital stores. Just weeks before the Rum Committee album release, Graham was asked to support Joan Armatrading, at Brighton Dome. With no solo releases to his name to distribute on the night, he worked with Rum Committee producers GI3MO, and Sherlock Bones, to create his first official release, the eight-track EP Bluestown (2012), which included one feature from the rap artist Ceezlin.

=== 2011–2015: Wolves and Disfigured ===
In 2011, Graham began to work with UK hip hop label High Focus Records, releasing a number of recordings with them such as a collaboration with MC and producer Leaf Dog titled Dog 'n Bone (2013) and a project with MC and producer Dirty Dike titled Put That Soul on Me (2014). Shortly afterwards, he began to collaborate with record producer Mark Crew, who at the time was working on Bastille's debut album Bad Blood. Graham signed a publishing deal with Warner Chappell Music in 2013.

In 2014, in collaboration with Mark Crew, Graham released the EP Wolves through Best Laid Plans Records, containing nine tracks with guests including rapper Vince Staples, Stig of the Dump, and Kae Tempest. Graham, along with Skunk Anansie, also featured on Bastille's third mixtape, VS. (Other People's Heartache, Pt. III), on the song "Remains". His follow-up in 2015, the EP Disfigured, was also released through Best Laid Plans Records. The lead track "Bitter End" was made into a playlist on BBC Radio 1 Xtra, and made it onto BBC Radio 1's "In New Music We Trust" playlist.

=== 2016–2020: Human ===
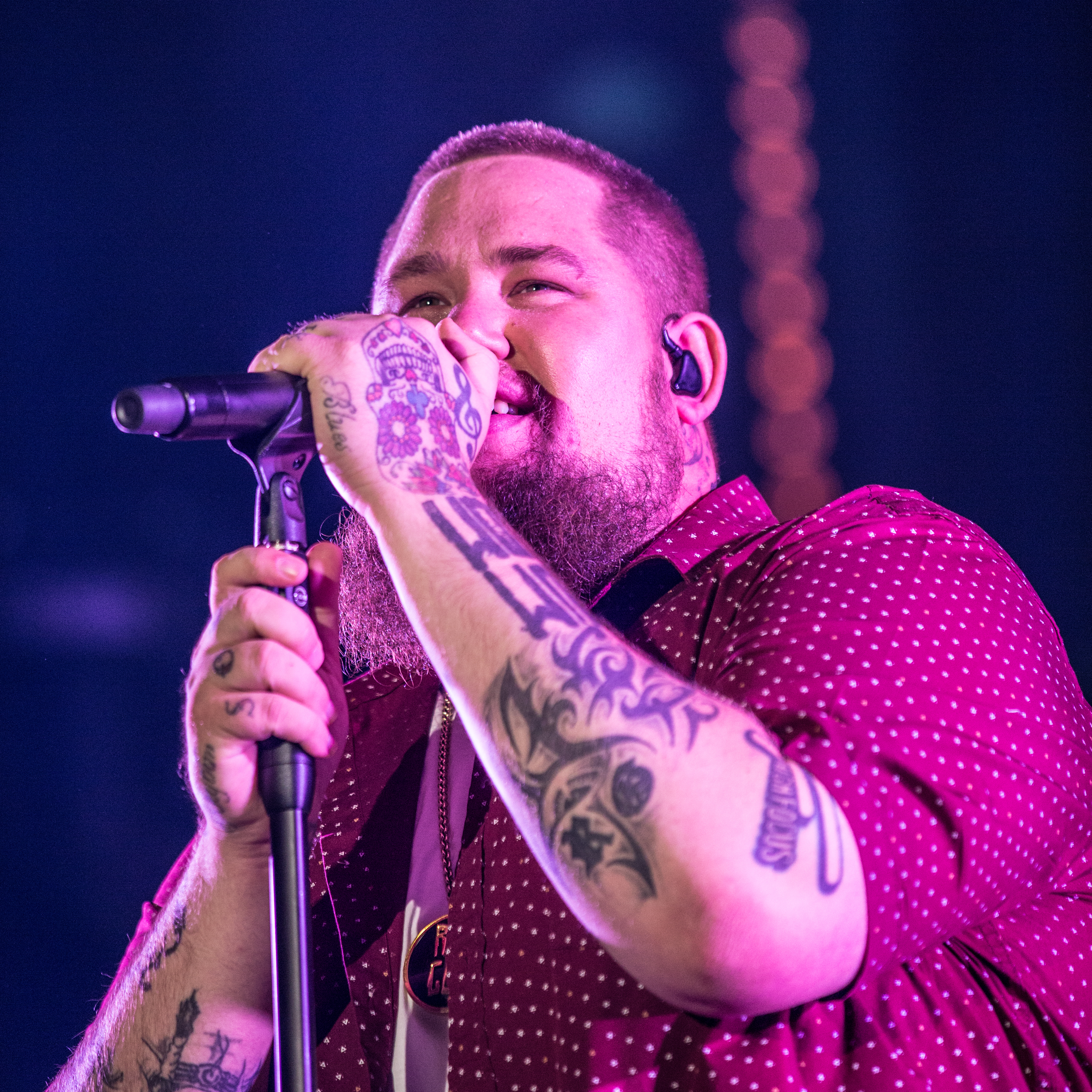
Graham at the 2017 SWR3 New Pop Festival

Graham's first hit single, "Human", was released on Columbia Records in July 2016. It peaked at number one in the official singles charts in Austria, Belgium, Germany, and Switzerland. It was certified Gold in Austria, Belgium, Germany, Italy, the Netherlands, Sweden, and Switzerland.

"Human" was used as the theme music to two Amazon Prime streaming television shows: Oasis in 2017, and Tom Clancy’s Jack Ryan in 2018. It was in the official launch trailer for the video game Mass Effect: Andromeda, in the trailer for the 2017 film Thank You for Your Service, in the television series Inhumans, and in the season 2 intro for the AMC television series Into the Badlands. The song was also used in an advertisement aired during Super Bowl LVII for the "He Gets Us" campaign, in the outro for the 9th episode of season 3 of Ash vs Evil Dead on Starz and in the 16th episode of season 7 of the USA Network series Suits.

Graham's debut album, also titled Human, came out on 10 February 2017. The album opens with the song "Human", features the single "Skin", and has tracks produced by Mark Crew, Two Inch Punch, and Jonny Coffer. The album won the BBC Music Award for Album of the Year, in 2017, and Graham was nominated for Artist of the Year. Later in 2017, he collaborated with British virtual band Gorillaz, appearing on the song "The Apprentice" from the deluxe edition of their fifth studio album Humanz.

Graham sang and co-wrote one of the songs, "Broken People", from Will Smith's 2017 Netflix film Bright. In January 2019, Graham collaborated with Scottish DJ and record producer, Calvin Harris, to record the song "Giant". It peaked at number two on the UK Singles Chart. He also collaborated with Zucchero Fornaciari, an Italian singer, to write the song "Freedom", for the album D.O.C.

=== 2021–2024: Life by Misadventure ===
In January 2021, Graham released "All You Ever Wanted", the lead single from his second studio album Life by Misadventure. He then collaborated with Pink for the second single from the album, "Anywhere Away from Here". Further singles from the album were "Alone", "Crossfire", and "Fall in Love Again". The album was originally going to be released on 23 April 2021, but was postponed to 7 May 2021.

Life by Misadventure debuted at number one on the UK Albums Chart and was in the top 10 for seven weeks, making it the fastest-selling album by a solo artist in 2021 and achieving Gold certification in the UK.

=== 2024–present: What Do You Believe In? ===
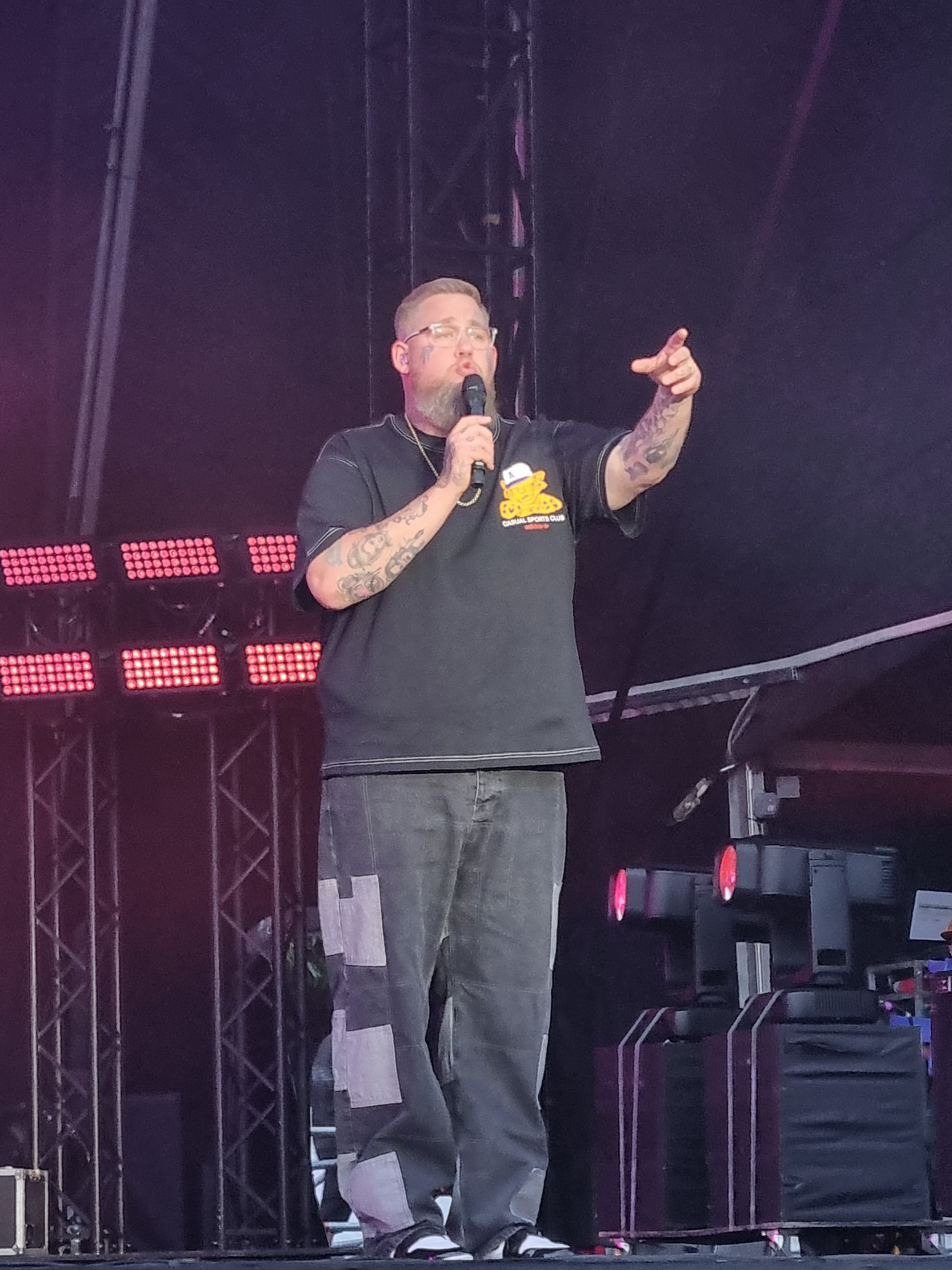
Rag'n'Bone Man performing at Cardiff Castle in Cardiff, Wales, July 2025

Graham's third studio album, What Do You Believe In?, was released on 18 October 2024. The title of the album stems from a conversation Graham had with his son about the death of Graham's mother. In 2025, Graham and South African-German musician and producer WizTheMc contributed an original song, "GOODLIFE", for the soundtrack of the American animated heist comedy film The Bad Guys 2 (the sequel to the 2022 film The Bad Guys, both loosely based on the children's book series by Australian author and former actor Aaron Blabey) and was released as a promotional single and the lead single from the soundtrack on 11 July 2025.

== Personal life ==
Graham married Beth Rouy in 2019 at Southover Grange in Lewes, Sussex and they have one son, Reuben, born in 2017. The couple separated six months later. Graham married waitress Zoe Beardsall in 2024 after being in a relationship since 2020. She has three children from a previous relationship. Zoe Graham received a 12-week suspended prison sentence and a one year driving ban in June 2026 after admitting "causing serious injury by careless driving" after crashing into a car carrying a mother and her three children, while running late on the school run in August 2023.

He lives in Heathfield, East Sussex.

== Discography ==
- Human (2017)
- Life by Misadventure (2021)
- What Do You Believe In? (2024)

== Accolades ==
Year	Awards	Category	Work	Result	Notes
2017	Brit Awards	Critics' Choice Award	Himself	Won	
2017	Brit Awards	British Breakthrough Act	Himself	Won	
2017	Echo Awards	International Newcomer	Himself	Won	
2017	Echo Awards	International Rock/Pop Male Artist	Himself	Won	
2017	MTV Europe Awards	Best New Act	Himself	Nominated	
2017	MTV Europe Awards	Best Push Act	Himself	Nominated	
2017	NRJ Music Awards	International Breakthrough of the Year	Himself	Won	
2017	Žebřík Music Awards	Best International Discovery	Himself	Nominated	
2017	Teen Choice Awards	Choice Rock/Alternative Song	"Human"	Nominated	
2017	mtvU Woodie Awards	Woodie to Watch	Himself	Nominated	
2018	Brit Awards	British Male Solo Artist	Himself	Nominated	
2018	Brit Awards	British Album of the Year	Human	Nominated	
2018	Brit Awards	British Single of the Year	"Human"	Won	
2018	GAFFA Awards	Best Foreign New Act	Himself	Nominated	
2020	Ivor Novello Awards	Most Performed Work	"Giant"	Won	
2020	Brit Awards	Song of the Year	"Giant"	Nominated	
2021	Berlin Music Video Awards	Best Concept	"All You Ever Wanted"	Nominated	
2022	Ivor Novello Awards	Best Song Musically & Lyrically	"All You Ever Wanted"	Nominated	
2022	GAFFA Awards	International Solo Act	Himself	Nominated	
2022	GAFFA Awards	International Album	Life by Misadventure	Nominated	

== Tours ==
=== Headlining ===
- Human Tour (2017)
- Life by Misadventure Tour (2021–2022)
- What Do You Believe In? Tour (2024–2025)

=== Supporting ===
- Robbie Williams – Britpop Tour (2025)
