= Anywhere Away from Here =

2021 single by Rag'n'Bone Man and Pink

Single by Rag'n'Bone Man and Pink

from the album Life by Misadventure
- Released: 9 April 2021
- Length: 3:58
- Label: Sony Music
- Songwriters: Ben Jackson-Cook; Dan Priddy; Mark Crew; Rory Graham; Simon Aldred
- Producers: Ben Jackson-Cook; Mike Elizondo; Rag'n'Bone Man

Rag'n'Bone Man singles chronology
"All You Ever Wanted" (2021)	"Anywhere Away from Here" (2021)	"Alone" (2021)

Pink singles chronology
"Cover Me in Sunshine" (2021)	"Anywhere Away from Here" (2021)	"All I Know So Far" (2021)

Music video
- "Anywhere Away from Here" on YouTube

"Anywhere Away from Here" is a song by British singer Rag'n'Bone Man and American singer Pink. It was released as a download and for streaming on 9 April 2021 as the second single from Rag'n'Bone Man's second studio album Life by Misadventure.

== Background ==
In a statement talking about the song, Rag'n'Bone Man said, "This song is an honest reflection of wanting to disappear from uncomfortable situations – about the vulnerabilities that we all face. It's an honour to have Pink on this record and I'm so glad she is able to be a part of it."

Pink also said in a statement how she met Rag'n'Bone Man in Europe in 2017 after she first heard his 2016 single "Human", "By then I had already fallen in love with his voice, and when we met in person I quickly learned he has a beautiful soul too. Since then, I knew I wanted to work with him one day. 'Anywhere Away From Here' couldn't be a better song for us to sing together. I'm so honoured to be a part of this collaboration."

== Composition ==
The song is composed in the key of B major in common time at a tempo of 65 beats per minute. The vocal range expands more than one octave, from F♯_{4} to G♯_{5}.

== Critical reception ==
Rob Copsey from the Official Charts Company said, "Following Rag'n'Bone Man's rousing single All You Ever Wanted, we're in ballad territory here – and this is proper balladry of the heart-tugging, goosebump-inducing kind. Production is stripped back to little more than a piano, allowing the emotional grit and growl in each of their vocals to take full flight".

== Music video ==
A music video to accompany the release of "Anywhere Away from Here" was first released onto YouTube on 9 April 2021.

== Personnel ==
Credits adapted from Tidal.

- Ben Jackson-Cook – producer, composer, lyricist, piano
- Mike Elizondo – producer
- Rag'n'Bone Man – producer, composer, lyricist, associated performer
- Dan Priddy – composer, lyricist
- Mark Crew – composer, lyricist
- Simon Aldred – composer, lyricist
- Doug Clarke – assistant engineer
- Erica Block – assistant engineer
- Zachary Stokes – assistant engineer
- Pink – associated performer
- Pete Josef – background vocal
- Bill Banwell – bass
- Wendy Melvoin – electric guitar
- Jamie Sickora – engineer
- Lawson White – engineer
- Chris Gehringer – mastering engineer
- Adam Hawkins – mixing engineer

== Charts ==
Chart performance for "Anywhere Away from Here"
Chart (2021)	Peak position
Australia (ARIA)	43
Belgium (Ultratip Bubbling Under Flanders)	23
Canada Hot 100 (Billboard)	88
Croatia (HRT)	18
Euro Digital Song Sales (Billboard)	1
Global 200 (Billboard)	153
Hungary (Single Top 40)	10
Ireland (IRMA)	44
New Zealand Hot Singles (RMNZ)	8
Slovakia Airplay (ČNS IFPI)	18
Switzerland (Schweizer Hitparade)	56
UK Singles (Official Charts)	9

== Certifications ==
Certifications and sales for "Anywhere Away From Here"
Region	Certification	Certified units/sales
New Zealand (RMNZ)	Gold	15,000^{‡}
United Kingdom (BPI)	Platinum	600,000^{‡}
^{‡} Sales+streaming figures based on certification alone.

== Release history ==
Release history for "Anywhere Away from Here"
Region	Date	Format	Label	Ref.
Various	9 April 2021	Digital download; streaming	Sony Music	
