= Special Forces (Julian Fane album) =

Studio album by Julian Fane
- Released: 2004
- Length: 56:49
- Label: Planet Mu
- Producer: Julian Fane

Julian Fane chronology
Special Forces (2004)	Our New Quarters (2007)

Professional ratings
Review scores
Source	Rating
AllMusic	3.5/5 stars

Special Forces is an album by Julian Fane, released in 2004.

== Track listing ==
1. "Disaster Location" - 3:57
2. "Safety Man" - 3:46
3. "Freezing In Haunted Water" - 6:09
4. "Sea Island" - 2:18
5. "Stasis" - 5:24
6. "Darknet" - 5:08
7. "Book Repository" - 5:55
8. "The Birthday Boys" - 6:39
9. "Taoist Blockade" - 3:46
10. "Coronation" - 2:03
11. "In Space" - 4:19
12. "Exit New Year" - 7:25
