= Packs (album) =

PACKS

Studio album by Your Old Droog
- Released: March 10, 2017
- Recorded: 2016–2017
- Genre: Hip-hop
- Length: 41:02
- Labels: Droog; Fat Beats
- Producers: Your Old Droog (also exec.); RTNC; Edan; E. Dan; The Alchemist; 88-Keys; Nice Rec; The Purist

Your Old Droog chronology
Your Old Droog (2014)	PACKS (2017)	It Wasn't Even Close (2019)

Singles from PACKS
- 1. "White Rappers (A Good Guest)" Released: June 16, 2016; 2. "G.K.A.C. (Gotta Kill a Cop)" Released: January 14, 2017; 3. "Help" Released: February 13, 2017

PACKS is the second studio album by American rapper Your Old Droog. It was released on March 10, 2017 through Droog Recordings under exclusive license to Fat Beats Records. The fourteen-track album includes guest appearances by rappers Danny Brown, Wiki, Chris Crack, Heems, Edan, and actor/comedian Anthony Jeselnik.

Professional ratings
Aggregate scores
Source	Rating
Metacritic	81/100
Review scores
Source	Rating
The A.V. Club	B
Exclaim!	8/10 stars
HipHopDX	4/5 stars
Pitchfork	7.7/10 stars

== Track listing ==
Track listing adapted from Bandcamp and iTunes.

No.	Title	Producer(s)	Length
1.	"G.K.A.C."	Nice Rec; E. Dan; Your Old Droog^{[a]}	3:46
2.	"Jeselnik Skit 1" (featuring Anthony Jeselnik)		0:07
3.	"I Only"	The Purist	4:10
4.	"Bangladesh" (featuring Heems)	RTNC; Your Old Droog	3:34
5.	"Grandma Hips" (featuring Danny Brown)	RTNC; Your Old Droog; E. Dan^{[a]}	2:28
6.	"Jeselnik Skit 2" (featuring Anthony Jeselnik)		0:08
7.	"Just An Interlude" (featuring Chris Crack)	RTNC	3:00
8.	"White Rappers (A Good Guest)"	RTNC; Your Old Droog	3:51
9.	"Help" (featuring Wiki and Edan)	Your Old Droog; Edan	3:55
10.	"Jeselnik Skit 3" (featuring Anthony Jeselnik)		0:11
11.	"You Can Do It! (Give Up)"	Your Old Droog; Edan	3:46
12.	"Rapman"	88-Keys	3:53
13.	"My Girl Is a Boy"	RTNC; Your Old Droog	3:14
14.	"Winston Red"	The Alchemist	4:58
Total length:			41:02

Notes

- ^{^[a]} signifies a co-producer

== Personnel ==
Vocalists

- Your Old Droog – vocals (tracks: 1, 3–5, 7–9, 11–14)
- Anthony Jeselnik – voice (tracks: 2, 6, 10)
- Himanshu Kumar Suri – vocals (track 4)
- Daniel Dewan Sewell – vocals (track 5)
- Chris Crack – vocals (track 7)
- Patrick Morales – vocals (track 9)
- Edan Portnoy – vocals (track 9)

Technicals

- Your Old Droog – producer (tracks: 1, 4–5, 8–9, 11, 13), executive producer
- Peter Mudge – producer (track 1)
- Eric "E. Dan" Dan – producer (tracks: 1, 5)
- Lawrence Lord – producer (track 3)
- El Richard Moringlane – producer (tracks: 4, 7–8, 13)
- Edan Portnoy – producer (tracks: 9, 11)
- Charles Misodi Njapa – producer (track 12)
- Alan Maman – producer (track 14)
- Dan "The Man" Humiston – recording
- Eddie Sancho – mixing
- Joe LaPorta – mastering
