= Our New Quarters =

Studio album by Julian Fane
- Released: 2007
- Length: 43:41
- Label: Planet Mu
- Producer: Julian Fane

Julian Fane chronology
Special Forces (2004)	Our New Quarters (2007)

Professional ratings
Review scores
Source	Rating
AllMusic	3.5/5 stars

Our New Quarters is the second album by Julian Fane, released in 2007.

== Track listing ==
1. "Our New Quarters" – 3:16
2. "New Faces" – 5:03
3. "Youth Cadet" – 4:41
4. "Where Are You Moon
5. "Downfall" – 3:37
6. "Jonah the Freak" – 5:32
7. "Break and Enter" – 3:21
8. "Rattle" – 4:46
9. "Among the Missing" – 4:37
10. "Plastics for a Heart" – 4:11
