= Edan (musician) =

American rapper (born 1978)

- Born: Edan Portnoy; 1978 (age 47–48); Washington, D.C., U.S.
- Origin: Rockville, Maryland, U.S.
- Genres: Hip-hop; psychedelic rap
- Occupations: Rapper; producer; DJ
- Years active: 1999–present
- Labels: Lewis Recordings; Stones Throw Records
- Website: www.humblemagnificent.com

Edan Portnoy (born 1978), better known mononymously as Edan or Edan the Humble Magnificent, is an American hip-hop artist from Rockville, Maryland.

== Early life ==
Born to middle-class parents who immigrated from Israel, Portnoy grew up in Rockville, Maryland. He is Jewish. In high school, he bought his first turntables and started mixing beats. Inspired by his classmate's rhymes, he started writing his own songs. After graduation, he entered Berklee College of Music, where he spent two and a half years. He dropped out of the college to focus on music full time.

== Career ==
Edan released his first solo studio album, Primitive Plus, on Lewis Recordings in 2002. It was described by The A.V. Club as "one of the year's most promising debuts". In 2005, he released his second solo studio album, Beauty and the Beat. It features guest appearances from Insight, Percee P, Mr. Lif, and Dagha. It peaked at number 40 on the UK Independent Albums Chart, as well as number 37 on the UK R&B Albums Chart. In 2009, he released a mixtape, Echo Party. It peaked at number 98 on the Billboard Top R&B/Hip-Hop Albums chart. In 2018, he released a collaborative studio album with rapper Homeboy Sandman, titled Humble Pi, on Stones Throw Records.

== Discography ==
=== Studio albums ===
- Primitive Plus (2002)
- Beauty and the Beat (2005)
- Humble Pi (2018) (with Homeboy Sandman)

=== Mixtapes ===
- Fast Rap (2001)
- Sound of the Funky Drummer (2004)
- Echo Party (2009)

=== EPs ===
- Sprain Your Tapedeck (2001)

=== Singles ===
- "Sing It, Shitface" (1999)
- "Edan and Company Bring You the Raw Shit" (2000)
- "Drop Some Smooth Lyrics" (2001)
- "Mic Manipulator" / "Humble Magnificent" (2001)
- "Emcees Smoke Crack Remixx" / "I'll Come Running Back 2 You" (2002)
- "I See Colours" (2004)
- "Fumbling Over Words That Rhyme" / "Beauty" (2005)
- "Torture Chamber Remix" (2005)

=== Productions ===
- Mr. Lif - "Heavy Artillery" and "Get Wise '91" from Emergency Rations (2002)
- Souls of Mischief - "Spark (Edan Remix)" (2002)
- Mr. Lif - "Live from the Plantation" from I Phantom (2002)
- Akrobatik - "The Hand That Rocks the Cradle" from Balance (2003)
- Time Machine - "@$$hole" from Slow Your Roll (2004)
- Mr. Lif - "Collapse the Walls" from I Heard It Today (2009)
- Mr. Lif - "Whizdom" from Don't Look Down (2016)
- Homeboy Sandman - "Talking (Bleep)" from Kindness for Weakness (2016)
- Your Old Droog - "Help" and "You Can Do It! (Give Up)" from Packs (2017)
- Akai Solo - "Barbatos" from Eleventh Wind (2020)
- The Avalanches - "Tonight May Have to Last Me All My Life (Edan Remix)" from Since I Left You 20th anniversary deluxe edition (2021)
- Your Old Droog - "Dropout Boogie" from Time (2021)

=== Guest appearances ===
- Count Bass D - "How We Met" from Dwight Spitz (2002)
- Mr. Lif - "Get Wise '91" from Emergency Rations (2002)
- Insight - "Unexplained Phenomena" from The Blast Radius (2004)
- Time Machine - "@$$hole" from Slow Your Roll (2004)
- Cut Chemist - "Storm" from The Audience's Listening (2006)
- Cut Chemist - "Mean Gene" (2006)
- The Whitefield Brothers - "The Gift" from Earthology (2009)
- Blu - "Ronald Morgan" from NoYork! (2011)
- DJ Format - "Spaceship Earth" from Statement of Intent (2012)
- Memory Man - "PSA (What Does It All Mean?)" from Broadcast One (2015)
- Cut Chemist - "Siesta (Demo)" from The Audience's Following (2016)
- Your Old Droog - "Help" from Packs (2017)
- Cut Chemist - "Metalstorm" from Die Cut (2018)
- Paten Locke - "Fried" from Americancer (2022)
- Kool Keith and Real Bad Man - “Rugged Rugged” from Serpent (2023)
