= Echo Party =

Mixtape by Edan
- Released: November 23, 2009
- Studio: 5L Studios, Brooklyn, New York, U.S.
- Genre: Hip-hop
- Length: 28:59
- Label: Five Day Weekend
- Producer: Edan

Edan chronology
Beauty and the Beat (2005)	Echo Party (2009)	Humble Pi (2018)

Vinyl edition
- Example of the vinyl cover

Echo Party is a mixtape by American hip-hop musician Edan. It was released via Five Day Weekend on November 23, 2009. It peaked at number 98 on Billboard's Top R&B/Hip-Hop Albums chart.

== Production ==
Edan was given access to the Traffic Entertainment Group vault of old school hip-hop to create the album, resulting in a single 29-minute track two years later. It was recorded using tape echo, guitar, and kazoo, among other instruments.

== Release ==
Echo Party was released on CD and vinyl. The vinyl release comes in a white sleeve, each with unique stencil and stamp artwork handmade by Edan, and is limited to 1000 copies.

== Critical reception ==
Professional ratings
Aggregate scores
Source	Rating
Metacritic	71/100
Review scores
Source	Rating
AllMusic	4/5 stars
The A.V. Club	B+
BBC	favorable
The Phoenix	3.5/4 stars
Pitchfork	6.8/10
PopMatters	6/10 stars
Spin	5/10

At Metacritic, which assigns a weighted average score out of 100 to reviews from mainstream critics, Echo Party received an average score of 71, based on 10 reviews, indicating "generally favorable reviews".

Rick Anderson of AllMusic said, "you'll hear vintage hip-hop basslines, 808 beats, and exuberant '80s-style rapping interspersed with weirdness like chopped-up Latin rhythms and shout-outs to New York boroughs and zodiac signs." Adam Kennedy of BBC called it "a production album over mere mixtape, one for the breakdancers, as well as appreciators of both forward-thinking and back-in-the-day craft." Nate Patrin of Pitchfork commented that "if you've ever wanted to hear classic cuts from the dawn of hip-hop turned into hallucinogenic setpieces that knock and clang like glitched-up King Tubby, Echo Party should justify whatever the hell it is Edan's been doing with his time over the past four years."

Dave Segal of The Stranger included it on the "2009's Top Overlooked Releases" list.

== Track listing ==
No.	Title	Length
1.	"Echo Party"	28:59

== Personnel ==
Credits adapted from liner notes.

- Edan – recording, mixing, concept, art direction, design
- Mark Donahue – mastering
- Trevor "Karma" Gendron – layout
- Matt Welch – executive production

== Charts ==
Chart (2009)	Peak position
US Top R&B/Hip-Hop Albums (Billboard)	98
