= Virtu-oso =

Virtu-oso a.k.a. V-Man
- Origin: London, England
- Genre: Hip hop
- Occupation: Record producer
- Instruments: Keyboard; Sampler; Drum Machine
- Years active: 2002 – present

Virtu-oso, alias V-Man, is a British record producer, who is noted for his work with UK rapper Persona Bars and also for his solo projects. His most high-profile work has been his production on Persona's underground track, "Let It B, Let It Grow", which went on the nighttime playlist of UK urban music channel, Channel U for a few months and received over 10, 000 views on YouTube. The track was supported by many UK pirate radio stations and developed an underground fan base, but failed to get any mainstream notice.

All of Virtu-oso's solo EPs have been released for free on the internet and fans of his music have distributed his tracks via blogs, podcasts, music compilations and in miscellaneous videos (The tracks "The Love Jam" and "Hectic Movements" from The Short Film EP are used for web videos by French soccer team, FC Metz). Also his tracks have been played on internet radio stations. His solo EP titled V-House Trailers featured the UK artist Infinite Livez (from the record label Big Dada).

On 2 March 2010, he put out a collaborative LP with Italian rapper, producer and DJ, Esa a.k.a. El Presidente, formerly with the group Otierre. The LP was titled Special Blend and was distributed for free download via their respective Myspace pages.

The track titled "Lean" from Virtu-oso's third solo project, A V-man Joint, was featured on Series 6 of the BBC's sitcom, Ideal.

V-Man produced a track entitled, "Earth, Wind, Fire, Water" on Stones Throw Records artist, Homeboy Sandman's 2016 album, Kindness for Weakness (2016).

== Production credits ==
- Takeover 2006 (Persona Bars album, 2006)
  - "Black People" (feat. Switcher & Nicole-Lavern)
- Music Therapy (Persona Bars album, 2007)
  - "Let It B, Let It Grow" (feat. Switcher & Lippa Kane)
  - "Mama Said"
- Kindness For Weakness (Homeboy Sandman album, 2016)
  - "Earth, Wind, Fire, Water" (feat. Yu, Tah Phrum Duh Bush and Shad)

== Solo discography ==
- 2008 The Short Film EP
- 2008 Peed Taorht (EP)
- 2008 A V-Man Joint (EP)
- 2008 V-House Trailers (EP)
- 2010 Special Blend [Collaboration album with Esa] (LP)
