= Human (Rag'n'Bone Man album) =

Studio album by Rag'n'Bone Man
- Released: 10 February 2017
- Genre: Soul; blues; pop
- Length: 41:44
- Label: Columbia
- Producer: Mark Crew; Braque; Jonny Coffer; Two Inch Punch; Johnny McDaid; Jamie Scott (exec.); Cadenza

Rag'n'Bone Man chronology
Disfigured (2015)	Human (2017)	Life by Misadventure (2021)

Rag'n'Bone Man studio album chronology
Human (2017)	Life by Misadventure (2021)

Singles from Human
- 1. "Healed" Released: 22 April 2016; 2. "Human" Released: 21 July 2016; 3. "Skin" Released: 26 January 2017; 4. "As You Are" Released: 18 July 2017; 5. "Grace" Released: 27 October 2017

Human is the debut studio album by British singer Rag'n'Bone Man. It was released on 10 February 2017 through Columbia Records and features his breakthrough single of 2016, entitled "Human". It debuted at number one on the UK Albums Chart with sales of 117,000, making it the fastest-selling debut album by a male artist during the 2010s.

== Critical reception ==
Professional ratings
Aggregate scores
Source	Rating
Metacritic	64/100
Review scores
Source	Rating
NME	4/5 stars
The Independent	2/5 stars

Human has been given a Metacritic score of 64 based on 14 reviews, indicating "generally favorable reviews". Leonie Cooper of NME gave the album a positive review stating, "Rory Graham's debut album is at once modern and classic, fusing blues, hip-hop and vintage sounds with a pop attitude". Kitty Empire of The Observer said "So it's a good job that Rag'n'Bone Man has the kind of righteous roar that could breathe life into the phone book" but criticised the album, saying it “spools together a set of reliable tropes with little in the way of topspin."

== Commercial performance ==
On 13 February 2017, the album was number one on The Official Chart Update, the album sold 70,000 copies and was outselling the top 20 combined. The album entered the UK Albums Chart on 17 February 2017 at number one. The album sold 117,000 copies across physical, download and streaming, making it the fastest-selling debut album by a male act during the 2010s. The album also reached number one in Belgium, the Czech Republic, the Netherlands, Ireland and Switzerland.

In France, it started at number two with 16,738 albums sold. It reached number one two weeks later. By the end of the year, 239,300 copies had been sold in the country. It was ranked twelve on the year-end album sales chart. Including streaming, the album was ranked eighth on the year-end album chart with 310,000 units. As of February 2018, it had sold 250,000 copies.

== Track listing ==
Human – Standard edition
No.	Title	Writer(s)	Producer(s)	Length
1.	"Human"	Rory Graham; Jamie Hartman	Two Inch Punch	3:20
2.	"Innocent Man"	Graham; Ben Ash; Simon Aldred	Two Inch Punch	3:06
3.	"Skin"	Graham; Jonathan Coffer; Jamie Scott; Mike Needle; Dan Bryer	Jonny Coffer	3:59
4.	"Bitter End"	Graham; Andrew Jackson; Mark Crew; Dan Priddy	Crew; Braque	3:39
5.	"Be the Man"	Graham; Coffer; Scott	Coffer	3:14
6.	"Love You Any Less"	Graham; Jackson; Crew; Priddy	Crew; Braque	4:21
7.	"Odetta"	Graham; Foy Vance	Crew; Braque	3:36
8.	"Grace"	Graham; Aldred; Frederick Cox	Crew; Braque	3:31
9.	"Ego"	Graham; Ash; Ina Wroldsen	Two Inch Punch	3:17
10.	"Arrow"	Graham; Coffer; Scott	Coffer	3:21
11.	"As You Are"	Graham; Coffer; Scott	Coffer	3:48
12.	"Die Easy"	Graham	Crew; Braque	2:32
Total length:				41:44

Human – Deluxe edition
No.	Title	Writer(s)	Producer(s)	Length
13.	"The Fire"	Graham; Johnny McDaid; Crew; Coffer; Priddy	McDaid; Coffer	3:42
14.	"Fade to Nothing"	Graham; Crew; Priddy; Sam Romans	Crew; Braque	3:42
15.	"Life in Her Yet"	Graham; Crew; Braque; Tinashé Fazakerley; Priddy	Crew; Braque	2:53
16.	"Your Way or the Rope"	Graham; Dan Smith; Crew; Jamie Lidell; Priddy; Lindsey Rome	Crew; Braque	3:24
17.	"Lay My Body Down"	Graham; Smith; Crew; Braque; Priddy	Crew; Braque	3:36
18.	"Wolves"	Graham; Crew; Fazakerley; Priddy	Crew; Braque	2:55
19.	"Healed"	Graham; Hartman; Oliver Rodigan; Joni Mitchell	Cadenza	2:56
Total length:				61:21

== Charts ==
=== Weekly charts ===
Chart (2017)	Peak position
Australian Albums (ARIA)	3
Austrian Albums (Ö3 Austria)	4
Belgian Albums (Ultratop Flanders)	1
Belgian Albums (Ultratop Wallonia)	2
Canadian Albums (Billboard)	9
Czech Albums (ČNS IFPI)	1
Danish Albums (Hitlisten)	5
Dutch Albums (Album Top 100)	1
Finnish Albums (Suomen virallinen lista)	6
French Albums (SNEP)	1
German Albums (Offizielle Top 100)	2
Hungarian Albums (MAHASZ)	23
Irish Albums (IRMA)	1
Italian Albums (FIMI)	12
New Zealand Albums (RMNZ)	3
Norwegian Albums (VG-lista)	3
Polish Albums (ZPAV)	14
Portuguese Albums (AFP)	9
Scottish Albums (OCC)	1
Spanish Albums (Promusicae)	71
Swedish Albums (Sverigetopplistan)	13
Swiss Albums (Schweizer Hitparade)	1
UK Albums (OCC)	1
US Billboard 200	117
US Americana/Folk Albums (Billboard)	4
US Heatseekers Albums (Billboard)	2
US Top Rock Albums (Billboard)	19

=== Year-end charts ===
Chart (2017)	Position
Australian Albums (ARIA)	23
Austrian Albums (Ö3 Austria)	38
Belgian Albums (Ultratop Flanders)	18
Belgian Albums (Ultratop Wallonia)	25
Danish Albums (Hitlisten)	32
Dutch Albums (MegaCharts)	18
French Albums (SNEP)	8
German Albums (Offizielle Top 100)	13
New Zealand Albums (RMNZ)	12
Swiss Albums (Schweizer Hitparade)	4
UK Albums (OCC)	2
US Folk Albums (Billboard)	13

Chart (2018)	Position
Belgian Albums (Ultratop Flanders)	131
French Albums (SNEP)	82
Swiss Albums (Schweizer Hitparade)	62
UK Albums (OCC)	19

=== Decade-end charts ===
Chart (2010–2019)	Position
UK Albums (OCC)	30

== Certifications ==
Region	Certification	Certified units/sales
Australia (ARIA)	Gold	35,000^{^}
Austria (IFPI Austria)	Gold	7,500^{‡}
Belgium (BRMA)	Gold	15,000^{‡}
Brazil (Pro-Música Brasil)	Platinum	40,000^{‡}
Canada (Music Canada)	Gold	40,000^{‡}
Denmark (IFPI Danmark)	Platinum	20,000^{‡}
France (SNEP)	3× Platinum	310,000
Germany (BVMI)	Platinum	200,000^{‡}
Netherlands (NVPI)	Gold	20,000^{‡}
New Zealand (RMNZ)	Gold	7,500^{‡}
Poland (ZPAV)	2× Platinum	40,000^{‡}
Switzerland (IFPI Switzerland)	2× Platinum	40,000^{‡}
United Kingdom (BPI)	4× Platinum	1,200,000^{‡}
^{^} Shipments figures based on certification alone.^{‡} Sales+streaming figures based on certification alone.

== Release history ==
Region	Date	Format	Label
Worldwide	10 February 2017	Digital download	Columbia
