= Your Old Droog =

American rapper

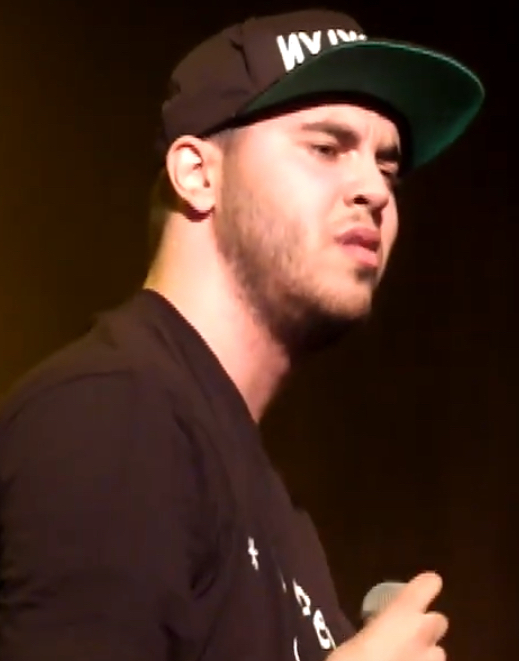
- Your Old Droog performing in 2015

Background information
- Also known as: YOD; Y.O.D.; Droog; Krutoy; Tvoy
- Born: 1989 (age 36–37); Ukrainian SSR, USSR
- Origin: Brooklyn, New York, United States
- Genre: Hip-hop
- Occupations: Rapper; record producer
- Years active: 2013–present
- Labels: Droog Recordings; Mongoloid Banks/Gogul Mogul; Nature Sounds
- Website: Official site

Your Old Droog is a Ukrainian-born American rapper and producer from Brooklyn, New York. He first gained public attention in June 2014 when online rumors were circulated that his self-published debut EP was actually recorded by veteran New York rapper Nas under an alter ego, before revealing himself in August of that year as a 25-year-old Ukrainian American. His self-titled debut album was released digitally on November 25, 2014. The name "Droog" comes from the Ukrainian word 'друг' meaning "friend".

== Biography ==
Droog's family emigrated to the United States from Ukraine when he was four years old. His family was Jewish, and his first language was Russian. As a young rap enthusiast growing up in Brooklyn, Droog first developed his craft in lunchroom battles in school.

In April 2014, he released the song "Nutty Bars", which generated a significant amount of buzz due to comparisons to Nas and the otherwise lack of information about the artist. The speculation began after Sacha Jenkins, a longtime associate of Nas, made a short positive review of the rapper on Mass Appeal with the sub-heading "Who is this guy? None of your damn business! Just enjoy the music and stop asking questions." The 10-song Your Old Droog EP was released soon after in June on SoundCloud, produced by Droog and RTNC (later known as Mono En Stereo). In August, Droog revealed himself in an interview with The New Yorker and soon showed his face for the first time in a video of him freestyling. At the time, he embraced the publicity and speculation regarding his identity, expressing that "This is like my street team, why would I stop free publicity?" He played his first concert on September 3 to a sold-out crowd at Webster Hall. His debut self-titled album was released digitally on November 26, which included the 10 songs from the EP along with 8 new songs produced by EL RTNC. A limited edition of the album was released on vinyl shortly before the digital release.

Kinison EP, Your Old Droog's second EP, was released on February 4, 2015, again on SoundCloud. Kinison's lyrical theme is that of Droog's appreciation of rock music as a child, with songs named after Rage Against the Machine, Porno for Pyros, and Sonic Youth. That February and March, Your Old Droog supported DJ Premier and Royce da 5'9" on their PRhyme Tour. Your Old Droog's third EP, The Nicest, was released on July 17, 2015.

In February 2017, Your Old Droog released What Happened to Fire?, an EP in collaboration with Ratking rapper Wiki. Later that month, Packs, Droog's second full-length album, was announced to be released on March 10, 2017. To coincide with the announcement, a music video for the album's single "Help" was released, featuring Wiki and Edan.

Droog released three full-length albums in 2019, with It Wasn't Even Close, Transportation, and Jewelry. It Wasn't Even Close was produced by Mach-Hommy and came out on April 20, 2019, featuring appearances by Doom, Wiki and Lil Ugly Mane. Transportation was produced again by Mono En Stereo and was released in June. Jewelry was released on December 23, 2019, featuring collaborations with the album's executive producer Mach-Hommy as well as Doom, Matisyahu, Quelle Chris, Edan, and Cohen Beats. The album is a celebration of his Jewish heritage, labeled a "A Chanukah Celebration" with Your Old Droog stating "I'm no longer going to diminish my heritage for your comfort, some people hate simply for the sake of hating, let them crumble under the weight of that burden...we will celebrate light and life...I'm a Jew in America. This is my story. Shalom."

== Artistry and influences ==
Your Old Droog has been extensively compared to fellow New York rapper Nas, to the point of theories being developed that his debut EP was actually recorded by Nas under an alter ego. Droog has appreciated the comparison and deemed it a compliment; he also named Big Daddy Kane, Big L, and Kool G Rap as influences, as well as Beanie Sigel, Freeway, Cassidy, and Lloyd Banks. He has named MF Doom as one of his favorites, from whom he has learned his approach to privacy as a rapper in the public eye.

== Discography ==
=== Studio albums ===
- Your Old Droog (2014)
- Packs (2017)
- It Wasn't Even Close (2019)
- Transportation (2019)
- Jewelry (2019)
- Dump YOD: Krutoy Edition (2020)
- Time (2021)
- Space Bar (2021)
- Movie (2024)
- Bread & Butter (2026)

=== Collaboration albums ===
- Tha Wolf on Wall St. (with Tha God Fahim) (2021)
- Tha YOD Fahim (with Tha God Fahim) (2021)
- Tha Wolf on Wall St. 2: The American Dream (with Tha God Fahim) (2022)

=== Extended plays ===
- Your Old Droog EP (2014)
- Kinison (2015)
- The Nicest (2015)
- What Happened to Fire? (with Wiki) (2017)
- Looseys (2017)
- YOD Wave (2022)
- Yod Stewart (2022)
- Yodney Dangerfield (2022)
- The Yodfather (2022)
- YOD Presents: The Shining (2022)
- Anything Is Possible (2025)
- Yod Serling (2025)

=== Singles ===
==== As lead artist ====
List of singles, showing year released and album name
Title	Year	Album
"The Dustiest"	2015	non-album singles
"42 (Forty Deuce)"	2016	non-album singles
"Hip-Hop Head"	2016	non-album singles
"DYLAN!"	2016	non-album singles
"Just Rhymin'" (featuring Styles P and Joey Badass)	2016	non-album singles
"White Rappers (A Good Guest)"	2016	Packs
"Help" (featuring Edan and Wiki)	2017	Packs
"You Can Do It! (Give Up)"	2017	Packs

=== Guest appearances ===
List of non-single guest appearances, with other performing artists, showing year released and album name
Title	Year	Other artist(s)	Album
"Hood Boogers"	2015	Statik Selektah, Chauncy Sherod	Lucky 7
"Wall Flowers"	2015	Statik Selektah, Termanology, Lord Sear	Lucky 7
"Stellar Intro"	2015	Maticulous	The Maticulous LP
"Revolutionary Ride Music"	2015	DJ EFN, Royce da 5'9", O.C., Reks	Another Time
"Gluttony"	2015	Gangrene, Fashawn	You Disgust Me
"Not That Guy"	2015	Apollo Brown	Grandeur
"Russian Rock Hammers"	2016	Timeless Truth	Cold Wave
"Complex City Cypher"	2016	Christian Scott, Wiki, ASAP Ferg	—N/a
"Vivian at the Art Basel"	2016	Westside Gunn	FLYGOD
"Volume 2"	2016	Larry Fisherman	¡Go Fish!
"3000 Avenue X"	2016	Masta Ace	The Falling Season
"Listen to Jazz"	2016	DJ Skizz	Cruise Control
"Pour House"	2020	Mach-Hommy	Mach's Hard Lemonade

=== Other songs ===
List of other songs, showing year released
Title	Year
"No Message" (feat. Ras RFC)	2014
"Sleepers..."	2014
"Central Park 5 (demo)"	2014
"Where The Rhymes At? ("Light Years" Freestyle)"	2014
"Senseless Killin' II"	2015
"Basketball & Seinfeld"	2015
