= All You Ever Wanted =

2021 single by Rag'n'Bone Man

Single by Rag'n'Bone Man

from the album Life by Misadventure
- Released: 29 January 2021
- Length: 3:06
- Label: Sony
- Songwriters: Ben Jackson-Cook; Mike Elizondo; Natalie Hemby; Rory Graham
- Producers: Ben Jackson-Cook; Mike Elizondo; Rag'n'Bone Man

Rag'n'Bone Man singles chronology
"Giant" (2019)	"All You Ever Wanted" (2021)	"Anywhere Away from Here" (2021)

"All You Ever Wanted" is a song by British singer Rag'n'Bone Man. It was released as a download and for streaming on 29 January 2021 as the lead single from his second studio album Life by Misadventure. The song was written by Ben Jackson-Cook, Mike Elizondo, Natalie Hemby and Rory Graham.

== Background ==
Talking about the song, Rag'n'Bone Man said, "I'd felt sad looking around Brighton and London where I grew up…remembering all those cool places that aren't there anymore." The song was recorded in Tennessee and was co-written and produced with his longtime collaborator Ben Jackson-Cook and Mike Elizondo.

== Music video ==
A music video to accompany the release of "All You Ever Wanted" was first released onto YouTube on 29 January 2021. The video was directed by Will Hooper.

== Personnel ==
Credits adapted from Tidal.

- Ben Jackson-Cook – producer, composer, lyricist
- Mike Elizondo – producer, composer, lyricist, electric guitar, programmer, synthesizer
- Rory Graham – producer, composer, lyricist, vocal
- Natalie Hemby – composer, lyricist
- Wendy Melvoin – acoustic guitar
- Erica Block – assistant engineer
- Jaime Sickora – assistant engineer
- Zachary Stokes – assistant engineer
- Bill Banwell – bass
- Daru Jones – drums
- Lawson White – engineer
- Chris Gehringer – mastering engineer
- Shawn Everett – mixing engineer

== Charts ==
Chart performance for "All You Ever Wanted"
Chart (2021)	Peak position
Belgium (Ultratip Bubbling Under Flanders)	2
Hungary (Rádiós Top 40)	16
Mexico Ingles Airplay (Billboard)	11
New Zealand Hot Singles (RMNZ)	25
Paraguay (SGP)	98
Poland (Polish Airplay Top 100)	21
San Marino (SMRRTV Top 50)	22
Slovakia Airplay (ČNS IFPI)	61
UK Singles (OCC)	29
US Adult Alternative Airplay (Billboard)	6
US Rock & Alternative Airplay (Billboard)	48

== Certifications ==
Certifications for "All You Ever Wanted"
Region	Certification	Certified units/sales
United Kingdom (BPI)	Gold	400,000^{‡}
^{‡} Sales+streaming figures based on certification alone.

== Release history ==
Release history for "All You Ever Wanted"
Region	Date	Format	Label	Ref.
Various	29 January 2021	Digital download; streaming	Sony Music	
