= Giant (Calvin Harris and Rag'n'Bone Man song) =

2019 single by Calvin Harris and Rag'n'Bone Man

Single by Calvin Harris and Rag'n'Bone Man
- Released: 11 January 2019
- Recorded: 2018
- Genre: Dance; house
- Length: 3:49
- Label: Columbia
- Songwriters: Adam Wiles; Rory Graham; Jamie Hartman; Troy Miller
- Producer: Calvin Harris

Calvin Harris singles chronology
"I Found You / Nilda's Story" (2018)	"Giant" (2019)	"I'm Not Alone 2019" (2019)

Rag'n'Bone Man singles chronology
"Photographs" (2018)	"Giant" (2019)	"All You Ever Wanted" (2021)

Music video
- "Giant" on YouTube

"Giant" is a song by Scottish DJ and record producer Calvin Harris and English singer Rag'n'Bone Man. The song was released through Columbia Records on 11 January 2019, and included on Harris' first compilation album, 96 Months (2024). It was written by Rag'n'Bone Man alongside Jamie Hartman and Troy Miller and produced by Harris.

"Giant" peaked at number two on the UK Singles Chart for five consecutive weeks. According to figures released by PPL, the track was the most played song in the UK in 2019.

The song topped the charts in Belgium and Scotland and reached the top 10 in Austria, Germany, Hungary, Ireland, the Netherlands, Poland, Slovakia, Slovenia and Switzerland; as well as the top 20 in Australia, Denmark, France, Italy, Lebanon, Norway and Romania.

In 2020, "Giant" was nominated for Song of the Year at the Brit Awards, closely losing out to Lewis Capaldi's "Someone You Loved". In the same year the song won the Ivor Novello award for PRS for Music Most Performed Work.

In 2021, the San Francisco Giants of Major League Baseball started playing "Giant" after home wins at Oracle Park before their traditional win song, "I Left My Heart in San Francisco" by Tony Bennett.

It was later used in a Lloyds Bank TV advert, which was released in February 2022.

== Composition ==
"Giant" is a gospel-inspired dance and house song. It was called a "soulful number" by Lincoln Journal-Star, with the snippet posted online featuring Rag'n'Bone Man singing "I understood loneliness/Before I knew what it was/Saw the pills on the table/For your unrequited love/I would be nothing".

== Promotion ==
Harris announced the song on 7 January through social media posting a preview. He and Rag'n'Bone Man performed it on The Graham Norton Show and at the 2019 Brit Awards.

== Music video ==
A lyric video for "Giant" was released on 10 January 2019 on YouTube.

The official music video for "Giant" was released on 25 January 2019 on Harris's YouTube channel. The video features a man wearing a blue jacket and trousers in his room where he walks outside of his house and starts running through the suburbs all the way to a forest where he encounters a group of people riding on horses wearing red jackets and pants, and starts dancing with them, and ends with him looking above the sky. Harris and Rag'n'Bone Man also appear in the video.

== Track listing ==
- Digital download
1. "Giant" – 3:49
- Audien extended remix
1. "Giant" (Audien Extended Remix) – 4:03
- Remixes – EP
1. "Giant" (Robin Schulz Remix) – 3:13
2. "Giant" (Purple Disco Machine Remix) – 3:26
3. "Giant" (Weiss Remix) – 3:54
4. "Giant" (Michael Calfan Remix) – 3:21
5. "Giant" (Audien Remix) – 3:33
6. "Giant" (Laidback Luke Remix) – 2:33

== Charts ==
=== Weekly charts ===
Weekly chart performance for "Giant"
Chart (2019)	Peak position
Australia (ARIA)	19
Australia Club (ARIA)	1
Australia Dance (ARIA)	3
Austria (Ö3 Austria Top 40)	8
Belgium (Ultratop 50 Flanders)	1
Belgium Dance (Ultratop Flanders)	1
Belgium (Ultratop 50 Wallonia)	1
Belgium Dance (Ultratop Wallonia)	2
Brazil (Top 100 Brasil)	85
Canada Hot 100 (Billboard)	29
China Airplay/FL (Billboard)	44
CIS Airplay (TopHit)	1
Colombia (National-Report)	55
Croatia (HRT)	1
Czech Republic Airplay (ČNS IFPI)	2
Czech Republic Singles Digital (ČNS IFPI)	7
Denmark (Tracklisten)	16
Euro Digital Song Sales (Billboard)	2
France (SNEP)	18
Germany (GfK)	6
Germany Airplay (BVMI)	1
Germany Dance (Official German Charts)	1
Greece (IFPI)	22
Hungary (Dance Top 40)	3
Hungary (Rádiós Top 40)	1
Hungary (Single Top 40)	5
Hungary (Stream Top 40)	10
Ireland (IRMA)	3
Italy (FIMI)	17
Japan Hot 100 (Billboard)	100
Latvia (LAIPA)	6
Lebanon (Lebanese Top 20)	19
Mexico Airplay (Billboard)	3
Netherlands (Dutch Top 40)	4
Netherlands (Single Top 100)	8
Netherlands (Dutch Dance Top 30)	1
New Zealand (Recorded Music NZ)	20
Norway (VG-lista)	11
Poland Airplay (ZPAV)	4
Portugal (AFP)	46
Romania (Airplay 100)	7
Russia Airplay (TopHit)	1
Scottish Singles Sales (Official Charts)	1
Slovakia Airplay (ČNS IFPI)	3
Slovakia Singles Digital (ČNS IFPI)	7
Slovenia (SloTop50)	1
Spain (Promusicae)	62
Sweden (Sverigetopplistan)	25
Switzerland (Schweizer Hitparade)	5
UK Singles (Official Charts)	2
Ukraine Airplay (TopHit)	35
US Dance Club Songs (Billboard)	1
US Hot Dance/Electronic Songs (Billboard)	8

2024 Weekly chart performance for "Giant"
Chart (2024)	Peak position
Moldova Airplay (TopHit)	70

=== Year-end charts ===
2019 year-end chart performance for "Giant"
Chart (2019)	Position
Argentina Airplay (Monitor Latino)	25
Australia (ARIA)	76
Austria (Ö3 Austria Top 40)	43
Belgium (Ultratop Flanders)	8
Belgium (Ultratop Wallonia)	5
Canada (Canadian Hot 100)	91
CIS (Tophit)	4
Denmark (Tracklisten)	41
France (SNEP)	44
Germany (Official German Charts)	33
Hungary (Dance Top 40)	9
Hungary (Rádiós Top 40)	19
Hungary (Single Top 40)	20
Iceland (Tónlistinn)	33
Ireland (IRMA)	15
Italy (FIMI)	59
Latvia (LAIPA)	47
Netherlands (Dutch Top 40)	18
Netherlands (Single Top 100)	25
New Zealand (Recorded Music NZ)	50
Poland (Polish Airplay Top 100)	20
Portugal (AFP)	117
Russia Airplay (Tophit)	4
Slovenia (SloTop50)	5
Switzerland (Schweizer Hitparade)	18
Tokyo (Tokio Hot 100)	59
Ukraine Airplay (Tophit)	157
UK Singles (OCC)	5
US Dance Club Songs (Billboard)	6
US Hot Dance/Electronic Songs (Billboard)	21

2020 yea-end chart performance for "Giant"
Chart (2020)	Position
Hungary (Dance Top 40)	58

== Certifications ==
Certifications and sales for "Giant"
Region	Certification	Certified units/sales
Australia (ARIA)	3× Platinum	210,000^{‡}
Austria (IFPI Austria)	Platinum	30,000^{‡}
Belgium (BRMA)	Platinum	40,000^{‡}
Brazil (Pro-Música Brasil)	Diamond	160,000^{‡}
Canada (Music Canada)	2× Platinum	160,000^{‡}
Denmark (IFPI Danmark)	Platinum	90,000^{‡}
France (SNEP)	Diamond	333,333^{‡}
Germany (BVMI)	Platinum	400,000^{‡}
Italy (FIMI)	2× Platinum	140,000^{‡}
Mexico (AMPROFON)	4× Platinum+Gold	270,000^{‡}
New Zealand (RMNZ)	2× Platinum	60,000^{‡}
Poland (ZPAV)	3× Platinum	60,000^{‡}
Portugal (AFP)	Platinum	10,000^{‡}
Spain (Promusicae)	Platinum	60,000^{‡}
United Kingdom (BPI)	4× Platinum	2,400,000^{‡}
United States (RIAA)	Gold	500,000^{‡}
^{‡} Sales+streaming figures based on certification alone.

== Release history ==
Region	Date	Format	Version	Label	Ref.
Various	11 January 2019	Digital download	Original	Columbia	
Italy	11 January 2019	Contemporary hit radio	Original	Sony	
United Kingdom	12 January 2019	Hot adult contemporary	Original	Columbia	
United States	21 January 2019	Hot adult contemporary	Original	Columbia	
United States	22 January 2019	Contemporary hit radio	Original	Columbia	
United States	22 January 2019	Dance radio	Original	Columbia	
Various	1 March 2019	Digital download	Audien Extended Remix	Columbia	
Various	8 March 2019	Digital download	Remixes EP	Columbia	

== Cover versions ==
The song has been covered by English singer Rick Astley as a non-album single in 2019 with Astley's version reaching number 78 on the UK Singles Chart.

== See also ==
- List of Billboard number-one dance songs of 2019
