= What Do You Believe In? =

Studio album by Rag'n'Bone Man
- Released: 18 October 2024
- Genre: Soul, pop
- Length: 53:10
- Label: Columbia
- Producer: Barnaby Keen; Dan Priddy; Serban Cazan; Jamie Lidell; Johnny McDaid; Jonny Coffer; Mark Crew; OAK; Rob Milton

Rag'n'Bone Man chronology
Life by Misadventure (2021)	What Do You Believe In? (2024)

Singles from What Do You Believe In?
- 1. "What Do You Believe In?" Released: 24 May 2024; 2. "Rush of Blood" Released: 13 August 2024; 3. "Pocket" Released: 4 October 2024

What Do You Believe In? is the third studio album by British singer Rag'n'Bone Man. It was released on 18 October 2024 through Columbia Records and was preceded by three singles: "What Do You Believe In?", "Rush of Blood" and "Pocket". The album debuted at number three on the UK Albums Chart and peaked at number two on the Scottish Albums Chart. The album serves as a follow-up to his 2021 album Life by Misadventure.

== Background and release ==
The album's title comes from a conversation Rag'n'Bone Man, whose real name is Rory Charles Graham, had with his son about the death of Graham's mother. About the album, Graham writes, "Although I'm nervous about the release of this new album and what people will make of it, when I take the vinyl from it's [sic] sleeve and put the needle down, I know I've made something real and authentic to me. This record What Do You Believe In? is my celebration of life and all of its twists & turns. Made with love." The album was released on 18 October 2024, with a deluxe edition released on the same day.

== Critical reception ==
Professional ratings
Review scores
Source	Rating
Clash	7/10
i	2/5 stars

The album received mixed reviews upon release. Robin Murray of Clash concludes that the album "offers sonic comfort while still challenging its maker. At times caramel smooth, at others breathlessly open, it’s a song cycle that revels in quiet truths." Writing for i, Ed Power negatively responds to the record, saying, "The hopes and fears that Rag'n'Bone Man wrestles with are authentic and universal. But the strength of those feelings is undermined by formulaic soul-pop." Reviewing the album for Renowned for Sound, Gabriel Barnett admits that while the album has "touching moments, Rag'n'Bone Man's powerful voice is the only consistent highlight. He touches on deeply personal themes, but the repetitive, sometimes corny production and a reluctance to evolve his sound make What Do You Believe In? an album that, though sincere, doesn’t stand out in this decade’s new golden era of popular music."

== Track listing ==
What Do You Believe In? – Standard edition
No.	Title	Writer(s)	Producer(s)	Length
1.	"The Right Way"	Ben Jackson-Cook; James Lidderdale; Rory Graham	Jamie Lidell	4:07
2.	"Pocket"	James Fauntleroy; Johnny McDaid; Jonathan Coffer; Graham	McDaid; Coffer	3:26
3.	"What Do You Believe In?"	Coleridge Tillman; Graham; Serban Cazan; Warren Okay Felder	Oak; Cazan	3:10
4.	"Iron"	Tillman; Graham; Cazan; Felder	Oak; Cazan	3:04
5.	"Hideaway"	Rob Milton; Graham; Simon Aldred	Milton	3:16
6.	"All I Know"	Tillman; Graham; Cazan; Felder	Oak; Cazan	3:03
7.	"Rush of Blood"	Dan Priddy; David Sneddon; Mark Crew; Graham	Priddy; Crew	3:22
8.	"Feeding All These Fires"	Barnaby Keen; Priddy; Crew; Graham	Keen; Priddy; Crew	2:29
9.	"Put a Little Hurt on Me"	Priddy; Crew; Mike Needle; Graham	Priddy; Crew	2:47
10.	"Chokehold"	Tillman; Graham; Cazan	Cazan	3:04
11.	"Wreckage"	Priddy; Crew; Needle; Graham	Priddy; Crew	2:54
12.	"Hope You Felt Loved at the End"	Priddy; Sneddon; Crew; Graham	Priddy; Crew	3:31
Total length:				38:13

What Do You Believe In? – Deluxe edition
No.	Title	Writer(s)	Producer(s)	Length
13.	"Bleed the Same"	McDaid; Coffer; Graham	McDaid; Coffer	3:13
14.	"Sorry for My Broken Heart"	Tillman; Graham; Cazan; Felder	Oak; Cazan	3:06
15.	"Ghosts"	McDaid; Coffer; Graham	McDaid; Coffer	2:47
16.	"Lovers in a Past Life" (Acoustic)	Adam Wiles; Andrew Watt; Cleo Tighe; Jon Green; Graham	Jackson-Cook; Rag'n'Bone Man	3:10
17.	"Lovers in a Past Life" (with Calvin Harris)	Wiles; Watt; Tighe; Green; Graham	Watt; Harris	2:47
Total length:				53:10

== Charts ==
Chart performance for What Do You Believe In?
Chart (2024)	Peak position
Belgian Albums (Ultratop Flanders)	117
French Albums (SNEP)	101
German Albums (Offizielle Top 100)	37
Scottish Albums (OCC)	2
Swiss Albums (Schweizer Hitparade)	10
UK Albums (OCC)	3

== Release history ==
Region	Date	Format	Label
Worldwide	18 October 2024	Digital download	Columbia
