= Life by Misadventure =

Studio album by Rag'n'Bone Man
- Released: 7 May 2021
- Genre: Soul, pop
- Length: 54:13
- Label: Columbia
- Producer: Rory Graham; Ben Jackson-Cook; Mike Elizondo

Rag'n'Bone Man chronology
Human (2017)	Life by Misadventure (2021)	What Do You Believe In? (2024)

Singles from Life by Misadventure
- 1. "All You Ever Wanted" Released: 29 January 2021; 2. "Anywhere Away from Here" Released: 9 April 2021

Life by Misadventure is the second studio album by British singer Rag'n'Bone Man. It was released on 7 May 2021 through Columbia Records and was preceded by two singles: "All You Ever Wanted" and "Anywhere Away from Here", a duet with American singer Pink. The album debuted at number one on the UK Albums Chart with sales of 42,000, including 33,000 on physical formats, making it the fastest-selling album by a solo artist in 2021. The album serves as a follow-up to his 2017 album Human.

== Critical reception ==
Professional ratings
Aggregate scores
Source	Rating
AnyDecentMusic?	6.3/10
Metacritic	62/100
Review scores
Source	Rating
Clash	7/10
The Guardian	3/5 stars
The Independent	2/5 stars
Line of Best Fit	6/10
Mojo	4/5 stars
NME	2/5 stars

Life by Misadventure has been given a Metacritic score of 62 based on eight reviews, indicating "generally favorable reviews". In a positive review, Clash's Josh Abraham noted that the "production is driven by a Motown style". However, it is not "afraid to get deep with a ballad or two". Kate Brayden at Hot Press opined that "Graham felt the need to maintain a safety net for the work, which has little experimentation" but still complimented his "unmatched vintage-meets-modern vocal talent". Narzra Ahmed of Line of Best Fit concluded that while "the first half of the album holds itself together so well", "the second half passes with little to no note". According to El Hunt at NME, "an artist obsessed with the idea of authenticity" is a trap Graham fell right into with the album.

== Track listing ==
All tracks produced by Rag'n'Bone Man, Ben Jackson-Cook and Mike Elizondo, except for "Old Habits", which was produced without Elizondo.

Life by Misadventure track listing
No.	Title	Writer(s)	Length
1.	"Fireflies"	Rory Graham; Gabe Simon; Natalie Hemby; Benjamin Jackson-Cook	3:18
2.	"Breath in Me"	Graham; Allen Shamblin; Michael Reid; Jackson-Cook	2:55
3.	"Fall in Love Again"	Graham; Jackson-Cook	2:42
4.	"Talking to Myself"	Graham; Ruby Amanfu; Sam Ashworth; Jackson-Cook	3:59
5.	"Anywhere Away from Here" (with Pink)	Graham; Simon Aldred; Mark Crew; Daniel Priddy; Jackson-Cook	3:59
6.	"Alone"	Graham; Bill Banwell; Jackson-Cook	4:36
7.	"Crossfire"	Graham; Banwell; Jackson-Cook	3:39
8.	"All You Ever Wanted"	Graham; Hemby; Jackson-Cook; Mike Elizondo	3:07
9.	"Changing of the Guard"	Graham; Aldred; Crew; Priddy; Jackson-Cook	3:26
10.	"Somewhere Along the Way"	Graham; Pat McLaughlin; Jackson-Cook	4:17
11.	"Time Will Only Tell"	Graham; McLaughlin; Jackson-Cook	2:56
12.	"Lightyears"	Graham; David Sneddon; Priddy; Jackson-Cook	3:13
13.	"Party's Over"	Graham; Aldred; Crew; Priddy; Jackson-Cook	3:40
14.	"Old Habits"	Graham	4:27
15.	"Anywhere Away from Here" (solo version)	Graham; Jackson-Cook; Priddy; Crew; Aldred	3:59
Total length:			54:13

== Personnel ==
Musicians

- Rag'n'Bone Man – vocals (all tracks), guitar (14)
- Mike Elizondo – acoustic bass guitar (1), acoustic guitar (3, 10), bass (3), programming (3, 4, 6, 8, 11), synthesizer (3, 4, 6–9, 11), electric guitar (7–10, 13)
- Wendy Melvoin – acoustic guitar (1, 2, 6–13), electric guitar (3–7, 9, 11–13, 15), mandolin (10), ukulele (12)
- Desri Ramus – background vocals (1, 7, 10, 12–14)
- Sylvia Mwenze – background vocals (1, 7, 12–14)
- Daru Jones – drums (1, 3, 4, 6–13)
- Bill Banwell – electric guitar (1), bass (2–13, 15)
- Ben Jackson-Cook – piano (1, 3–7, 9, 11–15), programming (3, 4), synthesizer (3, 4)
- Peter Josef – background vocals (2–6, 9–13, 15)
- Peter Gregson – strings (2)

Technical

- Chris Gehringer – mastering
- Adam Hawkins – mixing (1–5, 7, 9–15)
- Jacquire King – mixing (6)
- Shawn Everett – mixing (8)
- Lawson White – engineering (1–13, 15)
- Jamie Sickora – engineering (1–7, 9–13, 15), engineering assistance (8)
- Jamie Tinsley – engineering (14)
- Erica Block – engineering assistance (1–13, 15)
- Zachary Stokes – engineering assistance (1–13, 15)
- Doug Clarke – engineering assistance (1–7, 9–)

== Charts ==
=== Weekly charts ===
Chart performance for Life by Misadventure
Chart (2021)	Peak position
Australian Albums (ARIA)	4
Austrian Albums (Ö3 Austria)	7
Belgian Albums (Ultratop Flanders)	7
Belgian Albums (Ultratop Wallonia)	7
Canadian Albums (Billboard)	87
Czech Albums (ČNS IFPI)	69
Dutch Albums (Album Top 100)	5
French Albums (SNEP)	24
German Albums (Offizielle Top 100)	5
Irish Albums (OCC)	3
New Zealand Albums (RMNZ)	23
Polish Albums (ZPAV)	41
Scottish Albums (OCC)	1
Swiss Albums (Schweizer Hitparade)	3
Swiss Albums (Romandy)	1
UK Albums (OCC)	1

=== Year-end charts ===
Year-end chart performance for Life by Misadventure
Chart (2021)	Position
Swiss Albums (Schweizer Hitparade)	73
UK Albums (OCC)	20

== Certifications ==
Region	Certification	Certified units/sales
United Kingdom (BPI)	Gold	100,000^{‡}
^{‡} Sales+streaming figures based on certification alone.
