= Skin (Rag'n'Bone Man song) =

Single by Rag'n'Bone Man

from the album Human
- Released: 26 January 2017
- Recorded: July 2016-December 2016
- Genre: Soul; blues
- Length: 3:59
- Label: Columbia
- Songwriters: Rory Graham; Jonny Coffer; Jamie Scott; Mike Needle; Dan Bryer
- Producer: Jonny Coffer

Rag'n'Bone Man singles chronology
"Human" (2016)	"Skin" (2017)	"The Apprentice" (2017)

"Skin" is a song by British singer Rag'n'Bone Man. It was released as a download on 26 January 2017 through Columbia Records as the third single from his debut studio album Human (2017). The song was written by Rory Graham (Rag'n'Bone Man), Jonny Coffer, Jamie Scott, Mike Needle and Dan Bryer.

== Background and conception ==
The song's inspiration came from Graham when he was watching a Game of Thrones episode involving the relationship between Jon Snow and Ygritte.

== Music video ==
On 25 March 2017, the music video was uploaded to the Rag'n'Bone Man Vevo channel, directed by Greg Davenport. It features a young boy walking through an abandoned village, seeking shelter.

== Track listing ==
Digital download
No.	Title	Length
1.	"Skin"	3:59

== Charts ==
=== Weekly charts ===
Chart (2017)	Peak position
Australia (ARIA)	87
Austria (Ö3 Austria Top 40)	7
Belgium (Ultratop 50 Flanders)	13
Belgium (Ultratop 50 Wallonia)	7
Croatia International Airplay (Top lista)	4
Czech Republic Airplay (ČNS IFPI)	1
Czech Republic Singles Digital (ČNS IFPI)	38
Denmark (Tracklisten)	32
France (SNEP)	16
Germany (GfK)	10
Hungary (Rádiós Top 40)	20
Hungary (Single Top 40)	17
Iceland (RÚV)	3
Ireland (IRMA)	37
Italy (FIMI)	87
Latvia (Latvijas Top 40)	20
Mexico Ingles Airplay (Billboard)	12
Netherlands (Dutch Top 40)	18
Netherlands (Single Top 100)	33
Norway (VG-lista)	24
Poland Airplay (ZPAV)	3
Portugal (AFP)	76
Scottish Singles Sales (Official Charts)	5
Slovakia Airplay (ČNS IFPI)	1
Slovakia Singles Digital (ČNS IFPI)	41
Slovenia Airplay (SloTop50)	5
Switzerland (Schweizer Hitparade)	6
Switzerland (Media Control Romandy)	3
UK Singles (Official Charts)	13

=== Year-end charts ===
Chart (2017)	Position
Austria (Ö3 Austria Top 40)	57
Belgium (Ultratop Flanders)	34
Belgium (Ultratop Wallonia)	15
France (SNEP)	43
Germany (Official German Charts)	56
Hungary (Rádiós Top 40)	66
Hungary (Single Top 40)	62
Iceland (Tónlistinn)	25
Latvia Airplay (LaIPA)	59
Netherlands (Dutch Top 40)	84
Poland (ZPAV)	7
Slovenia (SloTop50)	8
Switzerland (Schweizer Hitparade)	13
UK Singles (Official Charts Company)	41
Chart (2018)	Position
Slovenia (SloTop50)	48

== Certifications ==
Region	Certification	Certified units/sales
Australia (ARIA)	Gold	35,000^{‡}
Austria (IFPI Austria)	Platinum	30,000^{‡}
Belgium (BRMA)	Gold	10,000^{‡}
Brazil (Pro-Música Brasil)	Platinum	40,000^{‡}
Canada (Music Canada)	Gold	40,000^{‡}
Denmark (IFPI Danmark)	Platinum	90,000^{‡}
France (SNEP)	Diamond	233,333^{‡}
Germany (BVMI)	Platinum	400,000^{‡}
Italy (FIMI)	Gold	25,000^{‡}
New Zealand (RMNZ)	2× Platinum	60,000^{‡}
Poland (ZPAV)	2× Platinum	40,000^{‡}
Switzerland (IFPI Switzerland)	3× Platinum	60,000^{‡}
United Kingdom (BPI)	2× Platinum	1,200,000^{‡}
^{‡} Sales+streaming figures based on certification alone.

== Release history ==
Region	Date	Format	Label
United Kingdom	26 January 2017	Digital download	Columbia
