= Stig of the Dump (rapper) =

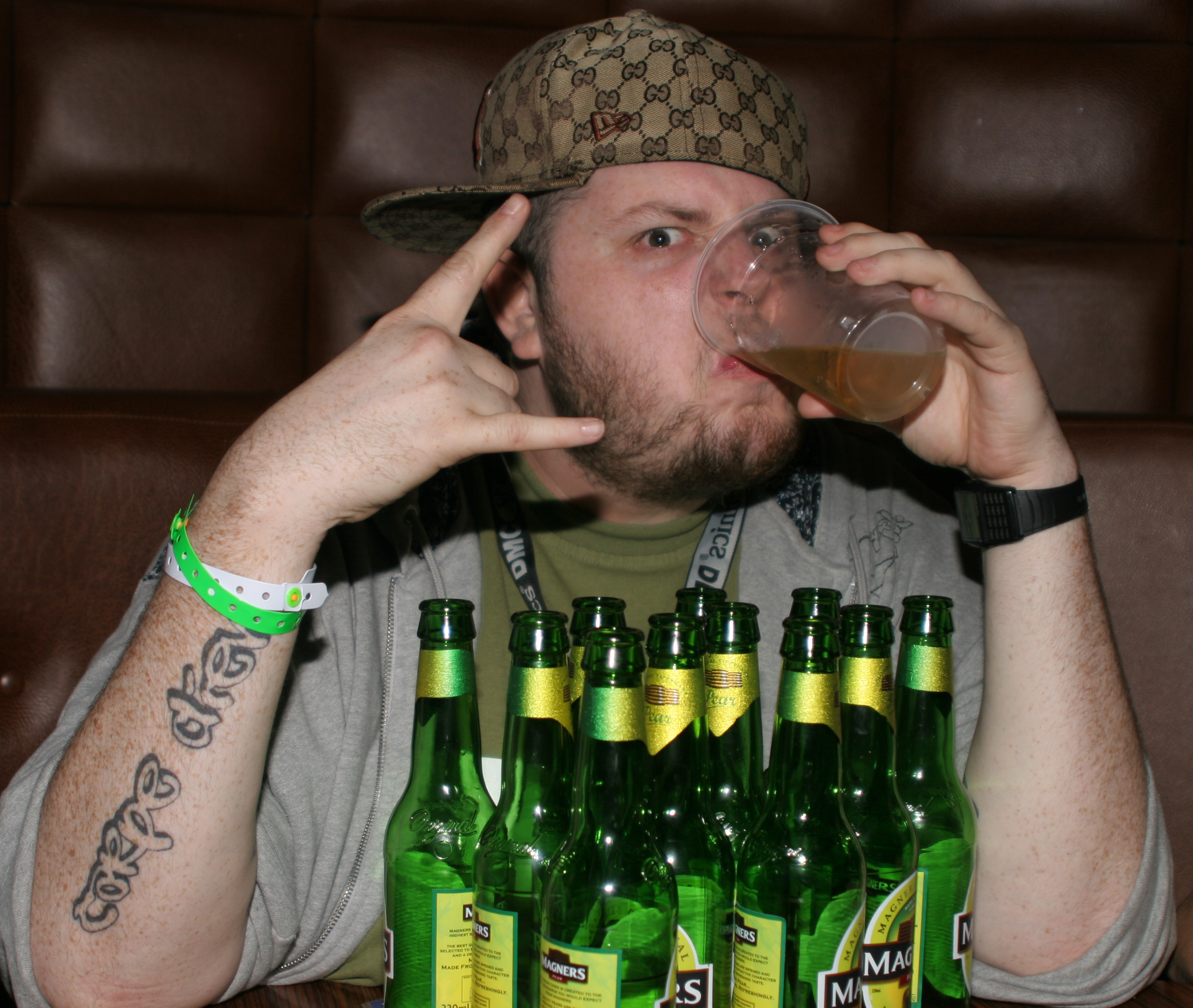
- Stig of the Dump, September 2009

Background information
- Also known as: King Grizzly; Piff Rhys Jones
- Born: Steve Dixon
- Origin: Newcastle upon Tyne, Tyne and Wear, England, United Kingdom
- Genres: Hip hop, dubstep
- Occupation: Rapper
- Years active: 2006-present
- Label: Lewis Recordings

Steve Dixon better known by his stage name Stig of the Dump, is an English rapper from Newcastle upon Tyne, who built a reputation as a battle rapper in London. He lived in Spain for many years but has now returned to the United Kingdom.

== Career ==
Stig's first major release was The Homeless Microphonist EP in 2006, followed by the Braindead 12", which featured RA the Rugged Man. He released his first full-length album, Mood Swings, in 2010. He is signed to Lewis Recordings and Beer & Rap.

Stig is a regular on the battle-rap circuits; his titles so far include two World End of the Weak Challenge Champion of Champions, two UK End of the Weak Challenge Champion, UK Battlescars Champion and Jump Off Tag Team Champion. He also gained notoriety for his impromptu battle with Asher D, at the film premiere of Life and Lyrics in 2006. He has also appeared as a judge on Don't Flop.

== Discography ==
- The Homeless Microphonist EP (2006, Beer & Rap)
- "Braindead" 12", featuring RA the Rugged Man (2007, Beer & Rap)
- I Got Game CD single (2010, Lewis Recordings)
- Mood Swings LP (2010, Lewis Recordings)
- "Cannon Fodder EP" (2012, Lewis Recordings)
- "Record 1" (2013, Lewis Recordings)
- Kubrick (2015 Lewis Recordings)

== Collaboration albums ==
- "Project Goon" – Legion of Goon (2017, Lewis Recordings)

== See also ==
- Stig of the Dump – 1963 children's novel
