= Human (Rag'n'Bone Man song) =

2016 song by Rag'n'Bone Man

Single by Rag'n'Bone Man

from the album Human
- Released: 21 July 2016
- Genre: Soul; alternative rock
- Length: 3:20
- Label: Sony; Columbia
- Songwriters: Jamie Hartman; Rory Graham
- Producer: Two Inch Punch

Rag'n'Bone Man singles chronology
"Healed" (2016)	"Human" (2016)	"Skin" (2017)

Music video
- "Human" on YouTube

"Human" is a song by British singer and songwriter Rag'n'Bone Man, co-written by Jamie Hartman, and produced by Two Inch Punch. It was released as a download on 21 July 2016 through Sony Music and Columbia Records. The song is included on his debut studio album of the same name, released in February 2017.

"Human" was used as the theme music to two Amazon Prime streaming television shows, Oasis in 2017 and Tom Clancy’s Jack Ryan in 2018. It was in the official launch trailer for the video game Mass Effect: Andromeda, in the trailer for the 2017 film Thank You for Your Service, in the television series Inhumans, and in the season 2 intro for the television series Into the Badlands. The song was also used in an advertisement aired during Super Bowl LVII for the "He Gets Us" campaign, in the outro for the 9th episode of season 3 of Ash vs Evil Dead, and in the 16th episode of season 7 of the series Suits.

== Critical reception ==
Cameron Adams of The Daily Telegraph compared the song to "Take Me to Church" by Hozier for both having an "instant impact, honest lyrics and throwback to ‘real’ music in a time of corporate pop."

In 2018, the song won a Brit Award for British Single of the Year.

== Live performances ==
Rag'n'Bone Man performed "Human" on Later... with Jools Holland on 20 September 2016. He also performed the song on Australian talk show The Morning Show on 28 October 2016. Another live performance of "Human" took place on The Graham Norton Show on 10 February 2017. He appeared on The Tonight Show Starring Jimmy Fallon on 16 February 2017.

== Chart performance ==
On 23 December 2016, the song reached number two on the UK Singles Chart, scoring the Christmas number two of 2016. The song was certified Platinum on 17 February 2017 and 2× Platinum 21 July 2017 by the BPI. It has sold 1,269,000 combined units in the UK as of September 2017, which comprises 522,000 copies in actual sales and 75 million in streams.

In the United States, the song reached number one on the Billboard Alternative Songs Chart and number two on Rock Airplay. It was certified Gold by the RIAA on 7 July 2017, and has sold 324,000 copies in the US as of September 2017. It is also Rag'n'Bone Man's only entry in the Billboard Hot 100 chart, as of 2022, and reached number 74 on a chart dated 27 May 2017.

The song had widespread chart success internationally, with it reaching the #1 spot on charts in more than 15 countries. As of July 2025, the music video has received 2 billion YouTube views.

== Formats and track listings ==
- Digital download
1. "Human" – 3:19
- Digital download (Rudimental remix)
1. "Human" (Rudimental remix) – 4:21

== Charts ==
=== Weekly charts ===
2016–2017 weekly chart performances for "Human"
Chart (2016–2017)	Peak position
Australia (ARIA)	17
Austria (Ö3 Austria Top 40)	1
Belarus Airplay (Eurofest)	5
Belgium (Ultratop 50 Flanders)	1
Belgium (Ultratop 50 Wallonia)	1
Canada Hot 100 (Billboard)	53
Canada CHR/Top 40 (Billboard)	42
Canada Hot AC (Billboard)	41
Canada Rock (Billboard)	1
Croatia International Airplay (Top lista)	1
CIS Airplay (TopHit)	1
Czech Republic Airplay (ČNS IFPI)	1
Czech Republic Singles Digital (ČNS IFPI)	6
Denmark (Tracklisten)	10
France (SNEP)	2
Germany (GfK)	1
Greece Airplay (IFPI)	1
Greece Digital (Billboard)	1
Hungary (Dance Top 40)	16
Hungary (Rádiós Top 40)	1
Hungary (Single Top 40)	1
Iceland (RÚV)	1
Ireland (IRMA)	8
Israel International Airplay (Media Forest)	2
Italy (FIMI)	2
Italy Airplay (EarOne)	1
Lebanon (Lebanese Top 20)	6
Mexico Airplay (Billboard)	30
Netherlands (Dutch Top 40)	9
Netherlands (Single Top 100)	14
New Zealand (Recorded Music NZ)	11
Poland Airplay (ZPAV)	1
Portugal (AFP)	11
Romania Airplay (Media Forest)	1
Romania TV Airplay (Media Forest)	1
Russia Airplay (TopHit)	1
San Marino Airplay (SMRTV Top 50)	1
Scottish Singles Sales (Official Charts)	1
Slovakia Airplay (ČNS IFPI)	1
Slovakia Singles Digital (ČNS IFPI)	1
Slovenia Airplay (SloTop50)	1
Spain (Promusicae)	10
Sweden (Sverigetopplistan)	23
Switzerland (Schweizer Hitparade)	1
Ukraine Airplay (TopHit)	2
UK Singles (Official Charts)	2
US Billboard Hot 100	74
US Adult Pop Airplay (Billboard)	20
US Pop Airplay (Billboard)	32
US Hot Rock & Alternative Songs (Billboard)	5
US Rock & Alternative Airplay (Billboard)	2

2018 weekly chart performance for "Human"
Chart (2018)	Peak position
CIS Airplay (TopHit)	65
Russia Airplay (TopHit)	98
Ukraine Airplay (TopHit)	56

2019 weekly chart performance for "Human"
Chart (2019)	Peak position
CIS Airplay (TopHit)	120
Ukraine Airplay (TopHit)	72

2020 weekly chart performance for "Human"
Chart (2020)	Peak position
CIS Airplay (TopHit)	171
Ukraine Airplay (TopHit)	21

2021 weekly chart performance for "Human"
Chart (2021)	Peak position
Ukraine Airplay (TopHit)	134

2022 weekly chart performance for "Human"
Chart (2022)	Peak position
CIS Airplay (TopHit)	134
Ukraine Airplay (TopHit)	89

2023 weekly chart performance for "Human"
Chart (2023)	Peak position
Belarus Airplay (TopHit)	115
CIS Airplay (TopHit)	118
Moldova Airplay (TopHit)	103
Romania Airplay (TopHit)	70
Ukraine Airplay (TopHit)	188

2024 weekly chart performance for "Human"
Chart (2024)	Peak position
Belarus Airplay (TopHit)	155
Moldova Airplay (TopHit)	23
Romania Airplay (TopHit)	127

2025 weekly chart performance for "Human"
Chart (2025)	Peak position
CIS Airplay (TopHit)	199
Moldova Airplay (TopHit)	53
Romania Airplay (TopHit)	81

2026 weekly chart performance for "Human"
Chart (2026)	Peak position
Norway Airplay (IFPI Norge)	90
Ukraine Airplay (TopHit)	66

=== Monthly charts ===
2016 monthly chart performance for "Human"
Chart (2016)	Peak position
CIS Airplay (TopHit)	17
Russia Airplay (TopHit)	15

2017 monthly chart performance for "Human"
Chart (2017)	Peak position
CIS Airplay (TopHit)	1
Russia Airplay (TopHit)	1
Ukraine Airplay (TopHit)	4

2018 monthly chart performance for "Human"
Chart (2018)	Peak position
CIS Airplay (TopHit)	77
Ukraine Airplay (TopHit)	58

2020 monthly chart performance for "Human"
Chart (2020)	Peak position
Ukraine Airplay (TopHit)	97

2023 monthly chart performance for "Human"
Chart (2023)	Peak position
Romania Airplay (TopHit)	79

2024 monthly chart performance for "Human"
Chart (2024)	Position
Moldova Airplay (TopHit)	52

2025 monthly chart performance for "Human"
Chart (2025)	Position
Romania Airplay (TopHit)	100

=== Year-end charts ===
2016 year-end chart performance for "Human"
Chart (2016)	Position
Austria (Ö3 Austria Top 40)	12
Belgium (Ultratop Flanders)	25
Belgium (Ultratop Wallonia)	74
Bulgaria Airplay (PROPHON)	6
France (SNEP)	183
Germany (Official German Charts)	9
Hungary (Single Top 40)	12
Italy (FIMI)	56
Netherlands (Dutch Top 40)	37
Switzerland (Schweizer Hitparade)	28

2017 year-end chart performance for "Human"
Chart (2017)	Position
Australia (ARIA)	89
Belgium (Ultratop Flanders)	61
Belgium (Ultratop Wallonia)	33
Bulgaria Airplay (PROPHON)	6
CIS Airplay (TopHit)	3
Denmark (Tracklisten)	66
France (SNEP)	7
Germany (Official German Charts)	85
Hungary (Dance Top 40)	41
Hungary (Rádiós Top 40)	5
Hungary (Single Top 40)	5
Hungary (Stream Top 40)	31
Iceland (Tónlistinn)	18
Israel International Airplay (Media Forest)	15
Italy (FIMI)	43
Latvia Airplay (LaIPA)	29
Netherlands (Dutch Top 40)	97
New Zealand (Recorded Music NZ)	50
Poland (ZPAV)	68
Romania (Airplay 100)	3
Russia Airplay (TopHit)	4
Slovenia Airplay (SloTop50)	26
Switzerland (Schweizer Hitparade)	7
Ukraine Airplay (TopHit)	11
UK Singles (Official Charts Company)	8
US Hot Rock Songs (Billboard)	11
US Rock Airplay (Billboard)	7

2018 year-end chart performance for "Human"
Chart (2018)	Position
CIS Airplay (TopHit)	114
Hungary (Rádiós Top 40)	73
Russia Airplay (TopHit)	194
Ukraine Airplay (TopHit)	72

2019 year-end chart performance for "Human"
Chart (2019)	Position
Ukraine Airplay (TopHit)	145

2022 year-end chart performance for "Human"
Chart (2022)	Position
Hungary (Rádiós Top 40)	38
Ukraine Airplay (TopHit)	175

2023 year-end chart performance for "Human"
Chart (2023)	Position
Belarus Airplay (TopHit)	164
CIS Airplay (TopHit)	191
Hungary (Rádiós Top 40)	44
Romania Airplay (TopHit)	148

2024 year-end chart performance for "Human"
Chart (2024)	Position
Hungary (Rádiós Top 40)	33

2025 year-end chart performance for "Human"
Chart (2025)	Position
Hungary (Rádiós Top 40)	90
Romania Airplay (TopHit)	187

=== Decade-end charts ===
Decade-end chart performance for "Human"
Chart (2010–2019)	Position
Germany (Official German Charts)	40
UK Singles (Official Charts Company)	47

== Certifications ==
Certifications and sales for "Human"
Region	Certification	Certified units/sales
Australia (ARIA)	2× Platinum	140,000^{‡}
Austria (IFPI Austria)	Platinum	30,000^{‡}
Belgium (BRMA)	2× Platinum	40,000^{‡}
Brazil (Pro-Música Brasil)	2× Diamond	500,000^{‡}
Canada (Music Canada)	4× Platinum	320,000^{‡}
Denmark (IFPI Danmark)	2× Platinum	180,000^{‡}
France (SNEP)	Diamond	233,333^{‡}
Germany (BVMI)	2× Platinum	800,000^{‡}
Italy (FIMI)	5× Platinum	250,000^{‡}
Mexico (AMPROFON)	Gold	30,000^{‡}
Netherlands (NVPI)	Gold	20,000^{‡}
New Zealand (RMNZ)	4× Platinum	120,000^{‡}
Poland (ZPAV)	Diamond	100,000^{‡}
Portugal (AFP)	Platinum	10,000^{‡}
Spain (Promusicae)	Platinum	60,000^{‡}
Sweden (GLF)	Platinum	40,000^{‡}
Switzerland (IFPI Switzerland)	5× Platinum	150,000^{‡}
United Kingdom (BPI)	4× Platinum	2,400,000^{‡}
United States (RIAA)	3× Platinum	3,000,000^{‡}
^{‡} Sales+streaming figures based on certification alone.

== Release history ==
Release dates for "Human"
Country	Date	Format	Label	Ref.
Worldwide	21 July 2016	Digital download	Sony	
Italy	7 October 2016	Contemporary hit radio	Sony	
United States	21 March 2017	Contemporary hit radio	Columbia	

== Tom Thum featuring Ruel cover ==
"Human"

Single by Tom Thum featuring Ruel
- Released: 8 December 2017
- Length: 3:30
- Songwriters: Jamie Hartman; Rory Graham
- Producer: Tom Thum

Music video
- "Human" on YouTube

In December 2017, Australians hip hop beat boxer Tom Thum and vocalist Ruel released a cover version with the backing track constructed exclusively from layers of Tom's vocal technique and Ruel singing over top.

The video was filmed as part of YouTube Australia's Pop-Up Space in Sydney's AFTRS studios.

=== Track listing ===
One-track single

1. "Human" – 3:30
