= Lewis Recordings =

British record label

- Founded: 2001
- Distributor: Independent
- Genre: Primarily Hip hop/Pop/Electronic
- Country of origin: United Kingdom
- Location: London, United Kingdom
- Official website: www.LewisRecordings.com

Founded by Mike Lewis, Lewis Recordings is an underground record label that currently has eight artists signed to it. It is primarily a Hip Hop/Rap label, and arguably its biggest artist is Edan, who has released two full-length albums to date under the label. It was founded in Belsize Park, north London, England, and is now based in Clerkenwell, central London.

The label has produced an Audio CD collection by various artists.

== Artists ==
- Edan
- Dagha
- Andrew Thompson
- Dooley-O
- Mighty Casey
- Cinnamon
- Kerogen
- Stig of the Dump
- Julian Fane
- Skinshape
