= Grammy Award for Songwriter of the Year, Non-Classical =

Annual music award

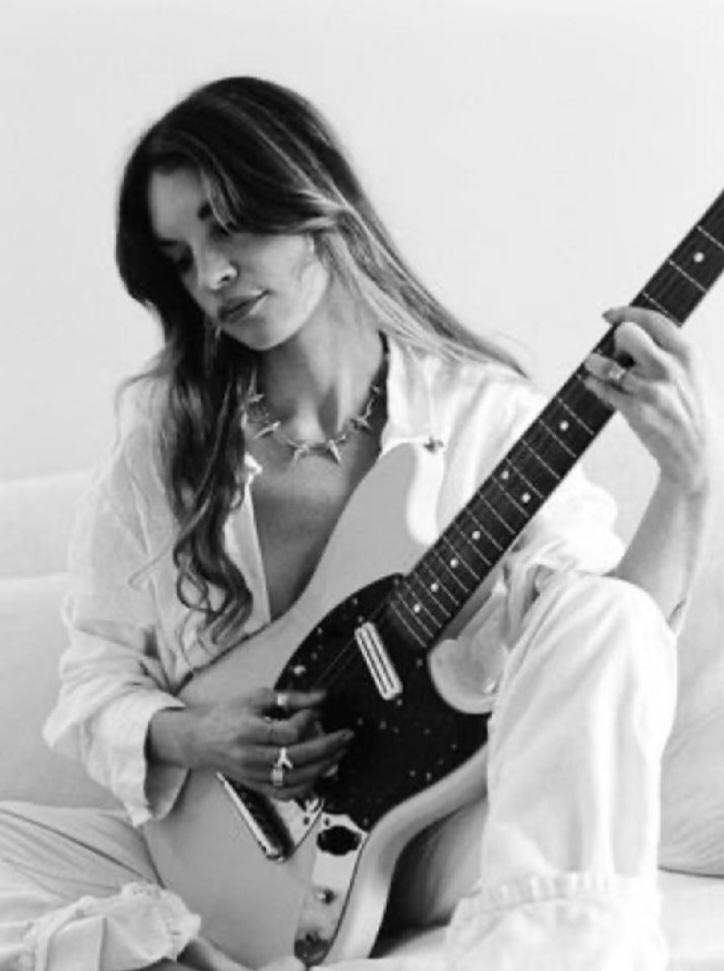
- Amy Allen is the most recent recipient
- Awarded for: Quality songwriting
- Presented by: National Academy of Recording Arts and Sciences
- First award: 2023
- Currently held by: Amy Allen (2026)

Highlights
- Most wins: Amy Allen (2)
- Most nominations: Amy Allen, Édgar Barrera, Jessie Jo Dillon (3)
- Website: grammy.com

The Grammy Award for Songwriter of the Year, Non-Classical is a relatively new category in the annual Grammy Awards show, introduced in the 65th edition held in February, 2023. The award comes after the launch of a special Songwriters & Composers Wing in the Recording Academy, which "elevates, supports and advocates on behalf of all songwriters and composers within (...) the industry at large".

According to the Wing's chair Evan Bogart, the new award is proof that composers and songwriters are now "able to make this dream of having an award that honors the compendium of an artist's yearly output and the impact it has each year on the musical landscape in the way the GRAMMYs have been honoring producers since 1975. I think the time to do that is now (...) People in the songwriting world have been calling for this award for more than a decade (...) We just came to the right moment in time to put the weight of the new Wing behind it and create it."

Nominated songwriters can come from any musical field, except Classical, as those composers are recognized in the Best Contemporary Classical Composition category. As of 2024, the category is part of the General Field and is voted on by the entire Academy voting membership.

Amy Allen is the only songwriter to win this category multiple times, winning twice in consecutive years. Allen and Édgar Barrera lead with four nominations each.

== Eligibility ==
To qualify for the award, writers “must have written a minimum of five songs in which they are credited ‘solely’ as a songwriter or co-writer” and that “songs in which the songwriter was also credited as a primary or featured artist, producer or any other supporting role do not qualify to achieve a minimum song threshold for consideration”, a distinction that was mandated in order ensure that the award honored songwriting and prevents big-named artists who write and perform or produce the majority of their own music from dominating the category. If a writer meets the threshold with external songs, they are permitted to submit up to four additional songs in which they are also the performer. According to Evan Bogart, CEO of the Recording Academy's Songwriters & Composers Wing, “we were able to strike the right balance and tone between people who are professional songwriters, who wake up every day and think about crafting songs for artists, and not just make this another award for a producer or an artist to win”.

Prospective nominees can submit up to nine songs that they have written or co-written during the eligibility period of each Grammy year that demonstrate their skill and talent.

As of the 67th Annual Grammy Awards in 2025, the number of submissions required where a writer is "solely" credited as a song/co-writer was reduced from five to four songs, and the number of additional songs where they are credited as an artist/producer was increased from four to five. The Recording Academy stated that these amendments were implemented with the hopes of allowing a "wider representation of the songwriter community".

== Winners and nominees ==
Year	Artist	Work
2023
2023	Tobias Jesso Jr.	"Boyfriends", "Can I Get It", "Careless", "C'mon Baby Cry", "Dotted Lines", "Let You Go", "No Good Reason", "Thank You Song", "To Be Loved"
2023	Amy Allen	"For My Friends", "The Hardest Part", "If We Were A Party", "If You Love Me", "Magic Wand", "Matilda", "Move Me", "Too Bad", "Vicious"
2023	Nija Charles	"Cozy", "Ex for a Reason", "Good Love", "IYKYK", "Lobby", "Ride for You", "Sweetest Pie", "Tangerine", "Throw It Away"
2023	The-Dream	"Break My Soul", "Church Girl", "Energy", "I'm That Girl", "Mercedes", "Rock N Roll", "Rolling Stone", "Summer Renaissance", "Thique"
2023	Laura Veltz	"Background Music", "Feed", "Humble Quest", "Pain", "29"
2024
2024	Theron Thomas	"All My Life", "Been Thinking", "Cheatback", "How We Roll", "Make Up Your Mind", "Pretty Girls Walk", "Seven", "Told Ya", "You And I"
2024	Edgar Barrera	"Cuestion De Tiempo", "Falsa Alarma (En Vivo)", "Gucci Los Paños", "La Despedida", "Mi Ex Tenía Razón", "Que Vuelvas", "Un Cumbión Dolido", "Un x100to", "Yo Pr1mero"
2024	Jessie Jo Dillon	"Buried", "Girl in the Mirror", "Halfway to Hell", "I Just Killed a Man", "Memory Lane", "Neon Cowgirl", "Screen", "The Town in Your Heart", "Up Above The Clouds (Cecilia's Song)"
2024	Shane McAnally	"Come Back to Me", "Good with Me", "He's Never Gunna Change", "I Should Have Married You", "Independently Owned", "Never Grow Up", "Start Nowhere", "Walmart", "We Don't Fight Anymore"
2024	Justin Tranter	"Gemini Moon", "Honey! (Are You Coming?)", "I Want More", "Jersey", "A Little Bit Happy", "Pretty Girls", "River"
2025
2025	Amy Allen	"Chrome Cowgirl", "Espresso", "High Road", "Please Please Please", "Run for the Hills", "Scared of My Guitar", "Selfish", "Sweet Dreams", "Taste"
2025	Jessi Alexander	"Ain't No Love in Oklahoma", "All I Ever Do Is Leave", "Chevrolet", "Make Me a Mop", "Never Left Me", "No Caller ID", "Noah", "Remember Him That Way", "Roulette on the Heart"
2025	Édgar Barrera	"Atencion", "(Entre Paréntesis)", "It Was Always You (Siempre Fuiste Tú)", "No Se Vale", "The One (Pero No Como Yo)", "Por el Contrario", "Si Antes Te Hubiera Conocido", "Sincere", "Tommy & Pamela"
2025	Jessie Jo Dillon	"Am I Okay?", "Go to Hell", "Heaven by Noon", "Lies Lies Lies", "Messed Up as Me", "Never Left Me", "No Caller ID", "Sorry Mom", "Two Hearts"
2025	Raye	"Ask & You Shall Receive", "Because I Love You", "Dear Ben Pt. II", "Genesis", "Mother Nature", "Paralyzed", "Riiverdance", "You're Hired"
2026
2026	Amy Allen	"Apt.", "Bad as the Rest", "Hail Mary", "Handlebars", "Just Keep Watching", "Lost in Translation", "Manchild", "Tears", "Why"
2026	Édgar Barrera	"Birthday Behavior", "Coleccionando Heridos", "Ese Vato No Te Queda", "Me Jalo", "Me Retiro", "Milagros", "Sigueme Besando Así", "Soltera", "Una Noche Contigo"
2026	Jessie Jo Dillon	"Bless Your Heart", "Bottomland", "Dreams Don't Die", "First Rodeo", "Happen to Me", "Hello S***ty Day", "If You Were Mine", "Patterns", "To The Men That Love Women After Heartbreak"
2026	Tobias Jesso Jr.	"Another Baby!", "Baby!", "Daisies", "From", "Go Baby", "Golden Burning Sun", "Man I Need", "Relationships", "Walking Away"
2026	Laura Veltz	"About You", "Blue Strips", "Grand Bouquet", "Leave Me Too", "Parallel Universe", "Someone In This Room", "Touch Me Like a Gangster", "What Tomorrow's For", "You'll Be OK, Kid"
2027	Amy Allen	"Cry Ugly", "Dashboard", "drop dead", "expectations", "For Always", "Likey Likey", "So Easy (To Fall in Love)", "Stupid", "Virtuoso"
2027	Édgar Barrera	"Broke My Heart", "Dando Vueltas", "Después De Ti", "For u My lova", "Lighter", "Ojitos Bellos", "Pvta Luna", "7-3", "Velas"
2027	Raye	"Click Clack Symphony", "God Be My Witness", "I Know You're Hurting.", "Joy.", "know about me", "Let Me Be In Your Arms", "Supermarket", "The WhatsApp Shakespeare.", "Where Is My Husband!"
2027	Joybeth Taylor	"Choosin' Texas", "Empty Words", "I Can't Love You Anymore", "Winner At Losing" (from Landman: Songs From And Inspired By The Paramount+ Original Series (Volume II))
2027	Theron Thomas	"Ain't In LA", "Be Good", "Champion", "Does She Know", "Eurosummer - Girls Trip", "FLAMED UP", "Me and my", "Sexy Ladies", "Too Easy"

== Songwriters with multiple awards ==
2 wins

- Amy Allen (consecutive)

== Songwriters with multiple nominations ==
4 nominations

- Amy Allen
- Édgar Barrera

3 nominations

- Jessie Jo Dillon

2 nominations

- Tobias Jesso Jr.
- Raye
- Theron Thomas
- Laura Veltz
