= Feli Ferraro =

Felicia Ferraro
- Born: 1993 (age 32–33); Connecticut, United States
- Other name: Feli Ferraro
- Musical career
- Genres: R&B; pop; hip-hop; k-pop; edm
- Occupations: Songwriter; singer; producer
- Labels: Arthouse Entertainment; Electric Feel; BMI Publishing; UMPG
- Website: www.arthouseent.com/feliferraro

Feli Ferraro is an American singer, producer and songwriter, best known for contributing various songs to artists in the K-pop industry, as well as co-written songs "Players" (Coi Leray), "Undecided" (Chris Brown), "Waves" (Normani & 6lack), "Wild Ones" (Jessie Murph & Jelly Roll), "Unforgiven" (Le Sserafim & Nile Rodgers), and "Time" from DJ Black Coffee's Grammy-winning 2021 album Subconsciously. Ranked #16 on Genius crowd-sourced "Top Songwriters of 2022" list, the Los Angeles-based musician was also longlisted for the Grammy Award for Songwriter of the Year, Non-Classical in 2024. Ferraro is signed to Kara DioGuardi's publishing company Arthouse Entertainment.

== Career ==
=== 2017-2019: Songwriting beginnings ===
Initially writing alongside former X Factor USA contestants Diamond White and Normani, Ferraro signed to Dioguardi's Arthouse Entertainment and began attending various writing sessions and songwriting retreats. She was next invited to a session by Chris Brown mixing engineer Patrizio 'Teezio' Pigliapoco, alongside Brown, Scott Storch, and writer Antonio Stith in August 2018, which quickly evolved into Indigo lead single "Undecided" after Brown began humming the melody.

=== 2020-Present: UMPG and Coi Leray ===
After writing for several Japanese boy bands, Ferraro was invited to a recurring Universal Music Publishing Group international writing camp that works to create songs based on specific, commissioned briefs from UMPG Korea, detailing genre, theme, and tempo. The completed songs are then pitched to various labels and artists in the K-pop, C-pop, and J-pop markets. Between this camp (nicknamed "The Hit Factory') and other writing opportunities, Ferraro has received co-write placements for BTS, Le Sserafim, Lay Zhang, Minho, TVXQ, Tomorrow X Together, and XG, among others.

In 2022, Ferraro collaborated with producer Johnny Goldstein and fellow writer Akil King to work on Coi Leray's major-label debut album Coi, co-writing or producing fourteen out of seventeen associated tracks, including top 10 hit "Players" and European hit "Baby Don't Hurt Me", both of which received Grammy nominations.

== Personal life ==
Ferraro recently married fellow musician and songwriter BENJMN, who she met at a past writing camp.

== Selected songwriting credits ==
Title	Year	Artist	Album
"Empty Cup"	2017	Diamond White	Non-album singles
"Cleopatron (Drunk on Me)"	2017	Diamond White	Non-album singles
"Waves" (featuring 6lack)	2018	Normani	Non-album singles
"Rumors" (With Sofia Carson)	2018	R3hab	The Wave
"Undecided"	2019	Chris Brown	Indigo
"Emerald / Burgundy" (featuring Juvenile & Juicy J)	2019	Chris Brown	Indigo
"Choices"	2019	Layton Greene	Tell Ya Story
"Control Myself"	2019	Generations	Shonen Chronicle
"All Day"	2019	The Rampage	The Riot
"Becoming"	2019	Diana Gordon	Non-album singles
"Paint the Sky" (featuring Tia Ray)	2019	Far East Movement	Non-album singles
"Dead End"	2019	Anna Clendening	Dead End
"Lonely"	2020	Chloe x Halle	Ungodly Hour
"None for You"	2020	Kiana Ledé	Kiki (Deluxe)
"X (1 Thing Wrong)"	2020	JoJo	Good to Know
"The Recipe" (featuring Rema)	2020	Aluna Francis	Renaissance
"Hurt" (featuring DeathbyRomy)	2020	Lost Kings	It's Not You, It's Me
"I Feel Good" (featuring Anthony Watts & DJWS)	2021	Pitbull	Non-album singles
"Nostálgico" (With Rauw Alejandro & Chris Brown)	2021	Rvssian	Non-album singles
"Time" (featuring Cassie)	2021	Black Coffee	Subconsciously
"Flying Apsaras"	2021	Lay Zhang	East
"Drive"	2021	Spencer Sutherland	Afterlife of the Party (soundtrack)
"Surprise"	2022	Chlöe	Non-album single
"Players"	2022	Coi Leray	Coi
"Bops"	2022	Coi Leray	Coi
"My Body"	2022	Coi Leray	Coi
"Run BTS"	2022	BTS	Proof
"Choice"	2022	Minho	Chase
"Cameo" (featuring Kareen Lomax)	2022	Kavinsky	Reborn
"Pray"	2022	Jessie Murph	Drowning
"Where Do You Go"	2022	Jessie Murph	Drowning
"I Would've"	2022	Jessie Murph	Drowning
"Worried"	2023	Chlöe	In Pieces
"I'll Kill You"	2023	Chlöe	Swarm
"Baby Don't Hurt Me" (featuring David Guetta & Coi Leray)	2023	Anne-Marie	Unhealthy
"Summer in the Hamptons"	2023	Jonas Brothers	The Album
"Walls" (featuring Jon Bellion)	2023	Jonas Brothers	The Album
"Unforgiven" (featuring Nile Rodgers)	2023	Le Sserafim	Unforgiven
"Rodeo"	2023	TVXQ	20&2
"Wild Ones" (With Jelly Roll)	2023	Jessie Murph	That Ain't No Man That's the Devil
"Ick"	2023	Lay Bankz	Now You See Me
"In Your Hands"	2024	Halle Bailey	Love... or Something Like It
"Tears"	2024	Perrie Edwards	Perrie
"Something Ain't Right"	2024	XG	Awe
"DUH!"	2024	Flo Milli	Bad Boys: Ride or Die (soundtrack)
"Over The Moon"	2024	Tomorrow X Together	The Star Chapter: Sanctuary
"Danger"	2024	Tomorrow X Together	The Star Chapter: Sanctuary
"Dream"	2025	Lisa	Alter Ego
"Not Your Man"	2025	Teddy Swims	I've Tried Everything but Therapy (Part 2)
"Northern Lights"	2025	Teddy Swims	I've Tried Everything but Therapy (Part 2)
"American Beauty"	2025	Nessa Barrett	Aftercare (Deluxe Edition)
"Hot"	2025	Le Sserafim	Hot
"Every Single Version of You"	2025	Warren Zeiders	Relapse, Lies & Betrayal
"Upside Down Kiss"	2025	Tomorrow X Together	The Star Chapter: Together
"Rocket Scientist"	2025	Perrie Edwards	Perrie
"Goodbye My Friend"	2025	Perrie Edwards	Perrie
"Woman In Love"	2025	Perrie Edwards	Perrie
"Little Bit"	2025	Demi Lovato	It's Not That Deep
"Say It"	2025	Demi Lovato	It's Not That Deep
"Confetti"	2025	Demi Lovato	It's Not That Deep
"Hello My Old Lover"	2025	Dove Cameron	TBA
"Heart On Fire"	2025	Midnight 'Til Morning	Afterglow
"No Good"	2026	XG	The Core
"God Must Really Love Me (intro)"	2026	Tori Kelly	God Must Really Love Me
"That Way"	2026	Katseye	Wild

=== Executive-produced/co-written projects ===
Projects with ~ 75% Felicia Ferraro production/songwriting credits or more
Album	Artist	Year	Label
Wasted Youth (EP)	Diana Gordon	2020	Warner Music Group; Warner Records
Coi	Coi Leray	2023	Uptown; Republic Records

== Guest appearances ==
List of guest appearances, with other performing artists, showing year released and album name
Title	Year	Other performer(s)	Album
"Wildcard"	2017	Mickey Valen	Wildcard Remixes EP
"I Can't Escape"	2018	Slander, SayMyName	Non-album single
"Contagious"	2018	Dante Klein, Dylan Jagger	Non-album single
"Pussy" (Background Vocals)	2022	Latto	Non-album single
"Eve, Psyche & the Bluebeard's Wife" (Background Vocals)	2023	Le Sserafim	Unforgiven
"Paradise"	2024	Chris Brown	Non-album single

== Awards and nominations ==
Year	Ceremony	Award	Result	Ref
2024	BMI Pop Music Awards	Most Performed Pop Songs (Baby Don't Hurt Me)	Won	
2024	People's Choice Country Awards	The Song of 2024 (Wild Ones)	Nominated	
