= That Ain't No Man That's the Devil =

Studio album by Jessie Murph
- Released: September 6, 2024
- Length: 36:56
- Label: Columbia
- Producers: Bekon; "Downtown" Trevor Brown; Chakra; Feenom; Gitty; Zaire Koalo; Oak; Pete G; Sergiu Gherman; Peter Gonzales; Steve Rusch; Gabe Simon

Jessie Murph chronology
Drowning (2023)	That Ain't No Man That's the Devil (2024)	Sex Hysteria (2025)

Singles from That Ain't No Man That's the Devil
- 1. "Wild Ones" Released: October 6, 2023; 2. "Son of a Bitch" Released: February 23, 2024; 3. "Cold" Released: April 26, 2024; 4. "Dirty" Released: August 2, 2024; 5. "I Hope It Hurts" Released: August 23, 2024; 6. "Someone in This Room" Released: September 4, 2024

That Ain't No Man That's the Devil is the debut studio album by American singer and songwriter Jessie Murph. It was released on September 6, 2024, via Columbia Records. It follows her 2023 mixtape Drowning, and includes the singles "Wild Ones", a collaboration with Jelly Roll, "Dirty", a collaboration with Teddy Swims, and "High Road", a collaboration with Koe Wetzel that was released in promotion of his album 9 Lives.

== Critical reception ==
Professional ratings
Review scores
Source	Rating
AllMusic	3/5 stars

That Ain't No Man That's the Devil is the debut studio album by American singer and songwriter Jessie Murph. It was released on September 6, 2024, via Columbia Records. It follows her 2023 mixtape Drowning, and includes the singles "Wild Ones", a collaboration with Jelly Roll, "Dirty", a collaboration with Teddy Swims, and "High Road", a collaboration with Koe Wetzel that was released in promotion of his album 9 Lives.

== Track listing ==
That Ain't No Man That's the Devil track listing
No.	Title	Writer(s)	Producer(s)	Length
1.	"Gotta Hold"	Jessie Murph; Sergiu Gherman; Jeff Gitelman; Peter Gonzales; Gregory Hein; Stuart Johnson; Daniel Krieger; Daniel Tannenbaum	Bekon; Gitty	2:51
2.	"Dirty" (with Teddy Swims)	Murph; Trevor Brown; Jaten Dimsdale; Oak Felder; Gitelman; Zaire Koalo; Cleo Tighe	"Downtown" Trevor Brown; Oak; Koalo	2:53
3.	"Son of a Bitch"	Murph; Gitelman; Carrie Karpinen; Gabe Simon; Tannenbaum	Gitty; Simon^{[c]}	2:35
4.	"It Ain't Right"	Murph; Karpinen; Steve Rusch	Rusch; Mischa Mandel^{[v]}	2:58
5.	"I Hope It Hurts"	Murph; Gitelman; Gherman; Gonzales; Johnson; Krieger; Tannenbaum	Bekon; Chakra; Gitty; Gonzales; Gherman; Johnson	4:09
6.	"Love Lies"	Murph; Rusch; Laura Veltz	Rusch; Mandel^{[v]}	2:05
7.	"Wild Ones" (with Jelly Roll)	Murph; Jason DeFord; Feli Ferraro; Hein	Gitty	2:21
8.	"Cold"	Murph; Gitelman; Gonzales; Johnson; Krieger; Tannenbaum; Jake Torrey	Bekon; Chakra; Feenom; Gitty; Pete G; Gherman	2:50
9.	"High Road" (with Koe Wetzel)	Murph; Amy Allen; Karpinen; Josh Serrato; Simon; Veltz; Ropyr Wetzel	Simon; Serrato^{[a]}; Karpinen^{[s]}; Ben Maddahi^{[v]}	2:59
10.	"Someone in This Room" (with Bailey Zimmerman)	Murph; Rusch; Austin Shawn; Veltz; Bailey Zimmerman	Rusch; Mandel^{[v]}	3:20
11.	"Bang Bang (The Ballad of Amy Fisher)"	Murph; Ben Burgess; Gitelman; David Ray Stevens; Tannenbaum; Veltz	Bekon; Gitty	3:08
12.	"I Could Go Bad"	Murph; Rusch	Rusch^{[p]}	4:47
Total length:				36:56

Notes

- ^{^[p]} signifies a primary and vocal producer
- ^{^[c]} signifies a co-producer
- ^{^[a]} signifies an additional producer
- ^{^[s]} signifies an assistant producer
- ^{^[v]} signifies a vocal producer

== Personnel ==
Musicians

- Jessie Murph – lead vocals (all tracks), background vocals (tracks 4, 6, 10, 12), piano (4, 12)
- "Downtown" Trevor Brown – bass, guitar, mandolin (track 2)
- Zaire Koalo – drums (track 2)
- Bryan Daste – pedal steel guitar (track 2)
- Oak Felder – programming (track 2)
- Teddy Swims – vocals (track 2)
- Steve Rusch – bass, drums, guitar, piano (tracks 4, 6, 10, 12); acoustic guitar (4, 6, 10), synthesizer (4, 6), organ (6, 12), percussion (6), keyboards (10, 12)
- Carrie Karpinen – background vocals (track 4); drums, percussion (9)
- Mischa Mandel – background vocals (track 4)
- Gabe Simon – background vocals, bass, mandolin, percussion (track 9)
- Josh Serrato – acoustic guitar, electric guitar, organ (track 9)
- Koe Wetzel – vocals (track 9)
- Justin Schipper – pedal steel guitar (track 10)
- Bailey Zimmerman – vocals (track 10)

Technical

- Dale Becker – mastering (tracks 1, 2, 4, 5, 10–12)
- Emerson Mancini – mastering (tracks 3, 7, 8)
- Ted Jensen – mastering (track 9)
- Rob Kinelski – mixing (tracks 1–6, 8, 10–12)
- Alex Tumay – mixing (track 7)
- Eli Heisler – mixing (track 8), engineering assistance (3)
- Ryan Hewitt – mixing, engineering (track 9)
- Jeff Gitelman – engineering (tracks 1–3, 5, 7, 11)
- Daniel Krieger – engineering (tracks 1, 5)
- Peter Gonzales – engineering (tracks 1, 5)
- Dante Hemingway – engineering (tracks 1, 5)
- Oak Felder – engineering (track 2)
- The Orphanage – engineering (track 2)
- John Busser – engineering (tracks 3, 7)
- Steve Rusch – engineering (tracks 4, 6, 10, 12)
- Mischa Mandel – engineering (track 4)
- Bekon – engineering (track 8)
- Ryan Sandlin – engineering (tracks 9–11)
- Hayden Duncan – engineering (track 9)
- Wil Anspach – engineering (track 9)
- Justin Schipper – engineering (track 10)
- Andrew Kim – engineering assistance (track 7)
- Nacor Zuluaga – engineering assistance (track 7)

== Charts ==
Chart performance for That Ain't No Man That's the Devil
Chart (2024)	Peak position
Australian Albums (ARIA)	76
Canadian Albums (Billboard)	29
New Zealand Albums (RMNZ)	32
US Billboard 200	24

== Certifications ==
Certifications for That Ain't No Man That's the Devil
Region	Certification	Certified units/sales
Canada (Music Canada)	Platinum	80,000^{‡}
New Zealand (RMNZ)	Gold	7,500^{‡}
United States (RIAA)	Platinum	1,000,000^{‡}
^{‡} Sales+streaming figures based on certification alone.
