= How Could You =

How Could You may refer to:

- "How Could You" (Jessie Murph song)
- "How Could You" (K-Ci & JoJo song)
- "How Could You" (Mario song)
