= Drive (Black Coffee and David Guetta song) =

2018 song by Black Coffee and David Guetta

Single by Black Coffee and David Guetta featuring Delilah Montagu

from the album 7 and Subconsciously
- Released: 24 August 2018
- Genre: Dance; deep house
- Length: 3:11
- Label: Soulistic Music; Universal Music South Africa; Ultra Music; Sony Music; UMG
- Songwriters: Nkosinathi Maphumulo; Ralph Wegner; Ilsey Juber; Mikkel S. Eriksen; Tor Erik Hermansen; David Guetta; Phillip Fender
- Producers: Black Coffee; David Guetta; Ralph Wegner; Stargate; Philippe Weiss; Shawn Joseph

David Guetta singles chronology
| "Goodbye" (2018) | "Drive" (2018) | "Ice Cold" (2018) |

Alternative cover
- Alternative cover for the Remixes

Music video
- "Drive (Official music video)" on YouTube

Official audio
- "Drive" on YouTube

"Drive" is a single by South African DJ and record producer Black Coffee and French DJ and music producer David Guetta from Guetta's seventh studio album 7 (2018) and Black Coffee's sixth studio album Subconsciously (2021), it features guest appearance from British singer Delilah Montagu and it was released on 24 August 2018 through Universal Music South Africa (under exclusive license from Soulistic Music, Ultra Music, Sony Music and UMG).

== Charts ==
Chart performance for "Drive"
| Chart (2018-2019) | Peak position |
|---|---|
| Hungary (Dance Top 40) | 7 |
| Hungary (Rádiós Top 40) | 3 |
| Hungary (Single Top 40) | 5 |
| South Africa (The Official South African Charts) | 7 |
| US Hot Dance/Electronic Songs (Billboard) | 31 |

== Certifications ==
Certifications for "Drive"
| Region | Certification | Certified units/sales |
|---|---|---|
| France (SNEP) | Gold | 100,000^{‡} |
^{‡} Sales+streaming figures based on certification alone.
