= 1965 (song) =

2025 song by Jessie Murph

Song by Jessie Murph

from the album Sex Hysteria
- Released: July 18, 2025
- Genre: Retro-soul
- Length: 2:48
- Label: Columbia
- Songwriters: Jessie Murph; Lennard Vink; Steve Rusch; Laura Veltz
- Producers: Vynk; Rusch; Veltz

Music video
- "1965" on YouTube

"1965" is a song by American singer Jessie Murph from her second studio album, Sex Hysteria (2025). It was released on July 18, 2025, through Columbia Records. It was produced by Vynk, Steve Rusch and Laura Veltz, all of whom wrote the song with Murph.

"1965" was met with widespread controversy and criticism regarding the lyrics' depiction of women's roles, and obscene displays in the corresponding music video. Murph defended the song, describing it as satire and a joke.

== Composition and lyrics ==
"1965" is a retro-soul song reminiscent of Amy Winehouse's music. It opens with a snippet of a mock commercial promoting the use of cigarettes and idea of women belonging in the kitchen. The production uses "seismic 808s", strings and a piano lick. In the explicit lyrics, Jessie Murph satirically takes the role of a present-day woman who is mistreated by her boyfriend to the extent that she romanticizes being a married woman in the 1960s. She compares the life of women in that era with those of modern times, highlighting the differences in advantages and disadvantages. For example, she wishes her partner would send her letters rather than booty calls. A notable line from the chorus is "I think I'd give up a few rights / If you would just love me like it's 1965". While she seemingly longs for a return to dating customs of the 1960s, Murph also acknowledges the restrictions of women's liberty during that period, in lyrics such as "I might get a little slap-slap, but you wouldn't hit me on Snapchat / Don't fuckin' text me at 2 AM sayin', 'Where you at, at?', boy, fuck you" (from the first verse) and "I would be twenty, and it'd be acceptable for you to be forty / And that is fucked up, I know / But at least you wouldn't drive off before I get in the fuckin' door / You fuckin' fuck, fuck you" (from the second verse). In the outro, which is given a vocal effect similar to the sound of an old gramophone recording, Murph mentions she would have been unable to watch the 1987 film Dirty Dancing, which is set in 1963, but would enjoy reading with her partner instead.

== Music video ==
The music video was released alongside the song; it takes place in a 1960s setting, with grainy footage. Jessie Murph wears a fancy white evening dress, and lacy lingerie at other times in the video, depicting herself as a bored housewife in a dysfunctional home environment. She poses and dances in front of an older man, her supposed husband, and his family, with a sense of calm detachment.

Another woman leads her husband to the bedroom. Then, after a scene where a little girl hands Murph an iPad, Murph watches her husband fornicate, doggy style, with a third woman on their bed. Later, as he is lying in bed, Murph cocks a pistol and sticks it into his mouth for cheating on her. She is also seen bound and gagged (like bondage) on the couch. At a dinner party, a woman is hiding under the table, between the bare legs of an older man (suggesting fellatio). The video frequently shows people smoking cigarettes, including Murph.

== Controversy ==
The song received heavy backlash in regard to the lyrical content. Many perceived Murph as advocating for the tradwife lifestyle and women's oppression, and normalizing domestic violence. The music video was also widely criticized, with many viewers believing it should not have been allowed on YouTube due to its sexually graphic content, especially concerning the sex scene. Some also took offense at the appearance of a child in such a video. Murph defended herself from the blowback in a TikTok video on July 19, 2025, stating "This entire song is satire r yall stupid", but the commenters were unconvinced. In an interview with Teen Vogue on July 21, Murph addressed the line about giving up her rights:

I had a feeling you were going to ask about that. That whole song is kind of a joke. I've been watching all of these old movies, a lot of '60s movies, and everything seems so romantic. It's a movie, so it's probably a lie. But I don't know, everything was slower. Everybody was more in the moment, I think. I really like a gentleman. But I didn't mean that line.

She further clarified, "Yeah, I don't actually want that. I love having rights. On the record, I love rights. Specifically [for] women. Like, what the fuck. Bodily rights specifically." Murph also explained the meaning behind another line in the song: "I'm trying to read books. If I didn't have to have a phone for what I do, I would not have a phone."

== Live performances ==
Jessie Murph performed the song on The Tonight Show Starring Jimmy Fallon on July 22, 2025.

== Charts ==
Chart performance for "1965"
Chart (2025)	Peak position
Canada Hot 100 (Billboard)	98
New Zealand Hot Singles (RMNZ)	14
US Billboard Hot 100	84
