= Wild Ones (Jessie Murph and Jelly Roll song) =

2023 single by Jessie Murph and Jelly Roll

Single by Jessie Murph and Jelly Roll

from the album That Ain't No Man That's the Devil
- Released: October 6, 2023
- Genre: Country; country pop; country rap
- Length: 2:21
- Label: Columbia
- Songwriters: Jessie Murph; Jason DeFord; Jeff Gitelman; Gregory Hein; Feli Ferraro
- Producer: Gitelman

Jessie Murph singles chronology
"Heartbroken" (2023)	"Wild Ones" (2023)	"Son of a Bitch" (2024)

Jelly Roll singles chronology
"Save Me" (2023)	"Wild Ones" (2023)	"Chevrolet" (2023)

Music video
- "Wild Ones" on YouTube

"Wild Ones" is a song by American singers Jessie Murph and Jelly Roll, released on October 6, 2023, as the lead single from the former's debut studio album That Ain't No Man That's the Devil (2024). Produced by Jeff "Gitty" Gitelman, the song peaked at number 35 on the Billboard Hot 100.

== Background ==
Jessie Murph started promoting the song on June 16, 2023, via her TikTok account. Jessie Murph and Jelly Roll then performed the song at the latter's concert on September 21, 2023, in Austin, Texas. They then began promoting the song collectively on social media up until its release.

== Composition ==
The song blends elements of country and hip hop music. It uses a hip-hop beat including jangly acoustic guitar samples. In the choruses and her verse, Jessie Murph talks about the type of people she finds attractive and describes them as "wild ones" that would have “a .45 on ‘em” and be driving recklessly at 102 mph. Jelly Roll combines singing and rapping while his lyrics focus on his wife, Bunnie XO, whom he also mentions by name in his verse.

== Charts ==
Chart performance for "Wild Ones"
Chart (2023–2024)	Peak position
Australia (ARIA)	75
Australia Country Hot 50 (The Music)	19
Canada Hot 100 (Billboard)	42
Global 200 (Billboard)	112
New Zealand Hot Singles (RMNZ)	6
US Billboard Hot 100	35
US Adult Pop Airplay (Billboard)	26
US Hot Country Songs (Billboard)	7
US Pop Airplay (Billboard)	17
US Rhythmic Airplay (Billboard)	35

=== Year-end charts ===
2024 year-end chart performance for "Wild Ones"
Chart (2024)	Position
US Billboard Hot 100	36
US Hot Country Songs (Billboard)	12

== Certifications ==
Certifications for "Wild Ones"
Region	Certification	Certified units/sales
Australia (ARIA)	2× Platinum	140,000^{‡}
Canada (Music Canada)	4× Platinum	320,000^{‡}
New Zealand (RMNZ)	Platinum	30,000^{‡}
United Kingdom (BPI)	Silver	200,000^{‡}
United States (RIAA)	4× Platinum	4,000,000^{‡}
^{‡} Sales+streaming figures based on certification alone.
