= Always Been You =

2021 single by Jessie Murph

Single by Jessie Murph

from the album Drowning
- Released: November 24, 2021
- Length: 2:11
- Label: Columbia
- Songwriters: Jessie Murph; Jenna Andrews; Steven Franks; Stephen Kirk
- Producers: Mr. Franks; Kirk

Jessie Murph singles chronology
"Sobriety" (2021)	"Always Been You" (2021)	"Pray" (2022)

Music video
- "Always Been You" on YouTube

"Always Been You" is a song by American singer-songwriter Jessie Murph, released on November 24, 2021 as the lead single from her debut mixtape Drowning (2023). Produced by Mr. Franks and Stephen Kirk, it is her first entry on the Billboard Hot 100, peaking at number 95.

== Background ==
By January 2022, the song amassed more than 21 million streams on Spotify. Stereogum included it on their list of "2022's Potential Pop Hits".

== Critical reception ==
Shannon Shumaker of Prelude Press wrote of the song, "The gorgeous love song quickly establishes her dynamic vocal range in soulful lows and soaring highs as well as her sonic range in quick fire verses and soaring choruses."

== Music video ==
The music video finds Jessie Murph walking into a store and being arrested. A video for her song "I Would've" serves as a prequel and shows why she was arrested.

== Charts ==
Chart performance for "Always Been You"
Chart (2021)	Peak position
Canada Hot 100 (Billboard)	72
Global 200 (Billboard)	198
Ireland (IRMA)	77
Netherlands (Single Tip)	6
New Zealand Hot Singles (RMNZ)	5
US Billboard Hot 100	95

== Certifications ==
Certifications for "Always Been You"
Region	Certification	Certified units/sales
Australia (ARIA)	Platinum	70,000^{‡}
Canada (Music Canada)	Platinum	80,000^{‡}
New Zealand (RMNZ)	Gold	15,000^{‡}
United Kingdom (BPI)	Silver	200,000^{‡}
United States (RIAA)	Platinum	1,000,000^{‡}
^{‡} Sales+streaming figures based on certification alone.
