= Heartbroken (Diplo, Jessie Murph and Polo G song) =

2023 single by Diplo, Jessie Murph and Polo G

Single by Thomas Wesley, Jessie Murph and Polo G

from the album Chapter 2: Swamp Savant
- Released: July 21, 2023
- Genre: Country pop
- Length: 3:24
- Label: Mad Decent; Columbia
- Songwriters: Thomas Pentz; Amy Allen; Elie Rizk; Ilsey Juber; Taurus Bartlett; Emeric Boxall; Jessie Murph
- Producers: Diplo; Elie Rizk; Maesic

Diplo singles chronology
"Without You" (2023)	"Heartbroken" (2023)	"Ashes" (2025)

Jessie Murph singles chronology
"Texas" (2023)	"Heartbroken" (2023)	"Wild Ones" (2023)

Polo G singles chronology
"Off the Court" (2023)	"Heartbroken" (2023)	"Barely Holdin' On" (2023)

Music video
- "Heartbroken" on YouTube

"Heartbroken" is a song by American DJ Diplo under his country alias Thomas Wesley, American singer Jessie Murph, and American rapper Polo G, released on July 21, 2023 as the fourth single from the former's reissue album Chapter 2: Swamp Savant. He produced the song with Elie Rizk and Maesic.

== Composition ==
"Heartbroken" is a country song, with a slow tempo. The production contains acoustic guitar, background vocals, synth pads and piano chords. The lyrics are about a partner helping another manage their heartbreak.

== Music video ==
The music video was directed by Blythe Thomas and released alongside the single. It finds the artists in a small town diner.

== Charts ==
=== Weekly charts ===
Weekly chart performance for "Heartbroken"
Chart (2023–2024)	Peak position
Canada Hot 100 (Billboard)	52
New Zealand Hot Singles (RMNZ)	11
US Billboard Hot 100	64
US Hot Country Songs (Billboard)	14
US Pop Airplay (Billboard)	23

=== Year-end charts ===
Year-end chart performance for "Heartbroken"
Chart (2023)	Position
US Hot Country Songs (Billboard)	80

== Certifications ==
Certifications for "Heartbroken"
Region	Certification	Certified units/sales
Australia (ARIA)	Platinum	70,000^{‡}
Canada (Music Canada)	2× Platinum	160,000^{‡}
New Zealand (RMNZ)	Gold	15,000^{‡}
United States (RIAA)	Platinum	1,000,000^{‡}
^{‡} Sales+streaming figures based on certification alone.

== Release history ==
Release dates and formats for "Heartbroken"
Region	Date	Format	Label(s)	Ref.
United States	August 15, 2023	Contemporary hit radio	Columbia	
