= Hurts Like You =

Single by Koe Wetzel

from the album The Night Champion
- Released: May 26, 2026
- Studio: Gold Pacific Studios
- Genre: Country rock
- Length: 3:15
- Label: YellaBush; Columbia
- Songwriters: Ropyr Wetzel; Ashley Gorley; Steph Jones; Carrie Karpinen; Gabe Simon
- Producers: Gabe Simon; Carrie Karpinen

Koe Wetzel singles chronology
"Time Goes On" (2026)	"Hurts Like You" (2026)	"Jaded" (2026)

Music video
- "Hurts Like You" on YouTube

"Hurts Like You" is song by American singer Koe Wetzel. It was released on May 26, 2026, as the first single to country radio (third overall) from Wetzel's seventh studio album, The Night Champion.

== Content ==
Wetzel co-wrote the song with Ashley Gorley, Steph Jones, Carrie Karpinen, and Gabe Simon, with the latter two also producing the track, which was recorded at Gold Pacific Studios in Nashville.

== Chart performance ==
"Hurts Like You" debuted at number 60 on the Billboard Country Airplay chart for the week dated June 13, 2026, and at number 29 on the Billboard Hot Country Songs chart following the release of The Night Champion.

== Charts ==
Weekly chart performance for "Hurts Like You"
Chart (2026)	Peak position
US Bubbling Under Hot 100 (Billboard)	2
US Country Airplay (Billboard)	48
US Hot Country Songs (Billboard)	29
US Hot Rock & Alternative Songs (Billboard)	26
