= Dirty (Jessie Murph and Teddy Swims song) =

2024 single by Jessie Murph and Teddy Swims

Single by Jessie Murph and Teddy Swims

from the album That Ain't No Man That's the Devil
- Released: August 2, 2024
- Length: 2:53
- Label: Columbia
- Songwriters: Jessie Murph; Jaten Dimsdale; Trevor Brown; Warren Felder; Jeff Gitelman; Zaire Koalo; Cleo Tighe
- Producer: Oak Felder

Jessie Murph singles chronology
"High Road" (2024)	"Dirty" (2024)	"I Hope It Hurts" (2024)

Teddy Swims singles chronology
"Funeral" (2024)	"Dirty" (2024)	"Bad Dreams" (2024)

Music video
- "Dirty" on YouTube

"Dirty" is a song by American singers Jessie Murph and Teddy Swims, released on August 2, 2024, as the fourth single from the former's debut studio album That Ain't No Man That's the Devil (2024). It was produced by Oak Felder, and reached number seventy nine of the US Billboard Hot 100.

== Background ==
The song finds the singers directing anger at former lovers that have treated them poorly. With respect to the song, Jessie Murph told Rolling Stone, "When someone fucks you over do you wallow and feel sorry for yourself? Or do you make them sorry for what they did?"

== Music video ==
The music video was released alongside the single. It finds Jessie Murph singing the song in a studio, coupled with a clip depicting her ex-partner being romantically involved with another woman and caught in the act in a car as it is towed.

== Charts ==
Chart performance for "Dirty"
Chart (2024)	Peak position
Canada Hot 100 (Billboard)	92
New Zealand Hot Singles (RMNZ)	7
US Billboard Hot 100	79

== Certifications ==
Certifications for "Dirty"
Region	Certification	Certified units/sales
United States (RIAA)	Gold	500,000^{‡}
^{‡} Sales+streaming figures based on certification alone.
