= Texas (Jessie Murph song) =

Single by Jessie Murph featuring Maren Morris
- Released: June 9, 2023
- Length: 3:18
- Label: Jessie Murph
- Songwriters: Jessie Murph; Alex Niceforo; Warren "Oak" Felder; Keith Sorrells; Amy Allen
- Producers: Alex Niceforo; Warren "Oak" Felder; Keith Sorrells

Jessie Murph singles chronology
"Cowboys and Angels" (2023)	"Texas" (2023)	"Heartbroken" (2023)

Maren Morris singles chronology
"I Can't Love You Anymore" (2022)	"Texas" (2023)	"Some Things I'll Never Know" (2023)

Music video
- "Texas" on YouTube

"Texas" is a song by American singers Jessie Murph and Maren Morris, who serves as a featured artist. It was self-released on June 9, 2023, under exclusive license to Columbia Records. The song marked Murph's first collaboration with another recording artist, with Morris joining after being personally invited by Murph, who had long admired her work. A breakup ballad incorporating elements of country, pop, and rap, "Texas" is accompanied by a rodeo-themed music video directed by Nicki Fletcher and Mason Allen.

== Background ==
According to Murph, Morris was her first choice for a featured artist on "Texas" because she had admired her music since childhood. Murph said she had been "singing Maren's songs" from a young age and described collaborating with her on the track as "so grateful", particularly because it marked her first featured collaboration. Morris stated the song's title initially caught her attention as she is a native of Texas. She described "Texas" as "a vulnerable breakup song with teeth" and praised Murph as "grounded and thoughtful", adding that she was pleased they had the opportunity to record the song together.

== Composition ==
"Texas" was written by Murph, Amy Allen, Alex Niceforo, Keith Sorrells, and Warren "Oak" Felder. Production was handled by Niceforo, Sorrells, and Felder, with Oscar Linnander serving as co-producer. Murph performs the lead vocals alongside featured vocals from Morris. Ben Maddahi served as vocal producer, while the song was recorded by Jimmy Robbins, Linnander, and Felder, mixed by Rob Kinelski, and mastered by Chris Allgood and Emily Lazar. Eli Heisler assisted with engineering.

"Texas" is a breakup ballad set in a minor key that blends elements of country, pop, and rap. Its lyrics center on the narrator coping with heartbreak after a former partner leaves and returns to Texas. In the song, Murph and Morris trade verses before joining for the chorus.

== Music video ==
Directed by Nicki Fletcher and Mason Allen, the accompanying music video is set at a rodeo, where Murph and Morris watch cowboys riding bucking broncos before confronting them. Throughout the video, Murph also performs portions of the song in a rap-influenced style.

== Personnel ==
Credits were adapted from Tidal.

- Jessie Murph – vocals, songwriter
- Maren Morris – featured vocals
- Alex Niceforo – producer, songwriter
- Keith Sorrells – producer, songwriter
- Warren "Oak" Felder – producer, songwriter, recording engineer
- Oscar Linnander – co-producer, recording engineer
- Amy Allen – songwriter
- Ben Maddahi – vocal producer
- Jimmy Robbins – recording engineer
- Rob Kinelski – mixing
- Chris Allgood – mastering
- Emily Lazar – mastering
- Eli Heisler – assistant engineer
