= Pray (Jessie Murph song) =

2022 single by Jessie Murph

Single by Jessie Murph

from the album Drowning
- Released: February 18, 2022
- Length: 2:26
- Label: Columbia
- Songwriters: Jessie Murph; Jenna Andrews; Gabe Simon; Felicia Ferraro; Stephen Kirk
- Producers: Andrews; Simon; Kirk; Chris Allgood

Jessie Murph singles chronology
"Always Been You" (2021)	"Pray" (2022)	"I Would've" (2022)

Music video
- "Pray" on YouTube

"Pray" is a song by American singer-songwriter Jessie Murph, released on February 18, 2022, as the second single from her debut mixtape Drowning (2023). It was produced by Jenna Andrews, Gabe Simon, Stephen Kirk and Chris Allgood. The song peaked at number 95 on the Billboard Hot 100.

== Background ==
Prior to its release, Jessie Murph had been teasing the song on the video-sharing platform TikTok, leading it to be used in nearly 100,000 videos.

With respect to the song, Murph has stated:

It's so important to me to be open and vocal about everything I'm going through. I always want to be honest with my fans and provide them with an outlet and music that they can relate to so they never feel alone. I'm so grateful for this community we're all building together.

In an interview with Notion, she said about the response to the song, "Honestly, it's been really comforting. I did write it about such an intense subject, but so many people relate. It's just been kind of crazy. A little overwhelming, but in a good way."

== Composition ==
In the song, Jessie Murph reflects on her troubled past and darkest moments, including experiencing depression and her relationship with her father, singing with an extensive vocal range.

== Charts ==
Chart performance for "Pray"
Chart (2022)	Peak position
Canada Hot 100 (Billboard)	70
Global 200 (Billboard)	137
Ireland (IRMA)	35
Netherlands (Single Tip)	10
New Zealand Hot Singles (RMNZ)	3
Norway (VG-lista)	9
Sweden Heatseeker (Sverigetopplistan)	3
UK Singles (Official Charts)	66
US Billboard Hot 100	95

== Certifications ==
Certifications for "Pray"
Region	Certification	Certified units/sales
Australia (ARIA)	Platinum	70,000^{‡}
Canada (Music Canada)	Platinum	80,000^{‡}
New Zealand (RMNZ)	Gold	15,000^{‡}
United Kingdom (BPI)	Silver	200,000^{‡}
United States (RIAA)	Platinum	1,000,000^{‡}
^{‡} Sales+streaming figures based on certification alone.
