= I'm Not There for You =

2025 single by Jessie Murph

Single by Jessie Murph

from the album Sex Hysteria (deluxe edition)
- Released: October 24, 2025
- Recorded: 2025
- Genre: Pop
- Length: 2:19
- Label: Columbia
- Songwriters: Jessie Murph; Omer Fedi; Henry Walter; Laura Veltz
- Producers: Fedi; Cirkut; Steve Rusch

Jessie Murph singles chronology
"Touch Me Like a Gangster" (2025)	"I'm Not There for You" (2025)	"Criminal" (2026)

Visualizer
- "I'm Not There for You" on YouTube

"I'm Not There for You" is a song by American singer Jessie Murph, from the deluxe edition of her second studio album, Sex Hysteria (2025). The song was released on October 24, 2025, through Columbia Records. It was produced by Omer Fedi, Cirkut and Steve Rusch.

== Background ==
Jessie Murph originally wrote the song when she was 17 years old and previewed a sample of it online in 2022, following which it became a fan favorite and was used in over 100,000 TikTok creations. Murph rewrote and re-recorded the song in 2025.

== Composition and lyrics ==
The song is accompanied by a strummed guitar and finds Murph dismissing an ex-boyfriend. She starts with the chorus, "I'm not there for you, I don't know your name / I ain't there for you, I don't feel a thing / Nothing left for you, yeah, I mean it, you fucked up / I ain't there for you, no". In the second verse, she proclaims that she has grown much stronger since she left him and no longer relies on him.

== Charts ==
Chart performance for "I'm Not There for You"
Chart (2025)	Peak position
Australia (ARIA)	92
Canada Hot 100 (Billboard)	33
New Zealand Hot Singles (RMNZ)	3
US Billboard Hot 100	66
