= Jaded (Koe Wetzel and Ella Langley song) =

2026 single by Koe Wetzel and Ella Langley

Single by Koe Wetzel and Ella Langley

from the album The Night Champion
- Released: August 7, 2026
- Genre: Country rock
- Length: 3:05
- Label: YellaBush; Columbia
- Songwriters: Ropyr Wetzel; Ella Langley; Jordan Schmidt; Ernest Keith Smith
- Producers: Gabe Simon; Jordan Schmidt; Carrie K

Koe Wetzel singles chronology
"Hurts Like You" (2026)	"Jaded" (2026)

Ella Langley singles chronology
"Loving Life Again" (2026)	"Jaded" (2026)	"Snakeskin Boots" (2026)

Visualizer
- "Jaded" on YouTube

"Jaded" is a song by American country music singers Koe Wetzel and Ella Langley. It was released on August 7, 2026 through YellaBush Records and Columbia Records. The song was written by both artists alongside Jordan Schmidt and Ernest Keith Smith.

== Background ==
"Jaded" is the second collaboration between the singers, following "That's Why We Fight" (2022). Wetzel praised Langley's vocal delivery, commenting that it draws listeners into the song before the lyrics have an emotional impact.

== Composition ==
The song features Wetzel's signature country rock style, while incorporating a 1970s disco-tinged sound. Over a strong backbeat and distant electric guitar, the singers portray a couple in an uneasy relationship, struggling with trust issues shaped by difficult experiences with former partners. They ask each other about the events that left them cynical.

== Charts ==
Chart performance
Chart (2026)	Peak position
Australia Country Hot 50 (The Music)	1
Canada Hot 100 (Billboard)	24
Canada Country (Billboard)	1
Global 200 (Billboard)	99
New Zealand Hot Singles (RMNZ)	5
US Billboard Hot 100	11
US Country Airplay (Billboard)	2
US Hot Country Songs (Billboard)	4
