= Blue Strips =

2025 single by Jessie Murph

Single by Jessie Murph

from the album Sex Hysteria
- Released: April 11, 2025
- Genre: Pop; pop trap
- Length: 2:27
- Label: Columbia
- Songwriters: Jessie Murph; Daniel Tannenbaum; Laura Veltz; Sergiu Gherman; Tyler Mehlenbacher
- Producer: Bekon

Jessie Murph singles chronology
"Gucci Mane" (2025)	"Blue Strips" (2025)	"Touch Me Like a Gangster" (2025)

Lyric video
- "Blue Strips" on YouTube

Music video
- "Blue Strips" on YouTube

"Blue Strips" is a song by American singer Jessie Murph from her second studio album, Sex Hysteria (2025). It was released on April 11, 2025, as the second single from the album. Produced by Bekon, it became Murph's highest-charting song on the Billboard Hot 100, peaking at number 15.

== Composition ==
"Blue Strips" is a pop song which contains a trap-inspired instrumental, with "tinny 808 drumbeats" and "distorted doomy basslines". Performing in her distinctive Southern twang, Jessie Murph sings about having revenge on a former partner who mistreated her by flaunting her wealth, including buying a mansion in Malibu, California and visiting a strip club where she is throwing $100 bills at a dancer and $1 bills at another dancer whom her ex is implied to have cheated on her with. Murph indicates their relationship has continued to stimulate negative emotions in her and she intends to escalate matters further. She also claims she is not mad at her partner but wants to seek retribution.

== Remix ==
On May 23, 2025, Murph released a remix to the song featuring American rapper Sexyy Red.

== Charts ==
=== Weekly charts ===
Weekly chart performance for "Blue Strips"
Chart (2025)	Peak position
Australia (ARIA)	17
Canada Hot 100 (Billboard)	11
Canada CHR/Top 40 (Billboard)	18
Global 200 (Billboard)	33
Ireland (IRMA)	63
New Zealand (Recorded Music NZ)	15
Norway (VG-lista)	91
US Billboard Hot 100	15
US Adult Pop Airplay (Billboard)	26
US Pop Airplay (Billboard)	9
US Rhythmic Airplay (Billboard)	8

=== Year-end charts ===
Year-end chart performance for "Blue Strips"
Chart (2025)	Position
Canada (Canadian Hot 100)	47
Canada CHR/Top 40 (Billboard)	64
US Billboard Hot 100	52
US Pop Airplay (Billboard)	35
US Rhythmic Airplay (Billboard)	42

== Certifications ==
Certifications for "Blue Strips"
Region	Certification	Certified units/sales
Australia (ARIA)	Platinum	70,000^{‡}
Canada (Music Canada)	2× Platinum	160,000^{‡}
New Zealand (RMNZ)	Gold	15,000^{‡}
United States (RIAA)	2× Platinum	2,000,000^{‡}
^{‡} Sales+streaming figures based on certification alone.

== Release history ==
Release dates and formats for "Blue Strips"
Region	Date	Format(s)	Version(s)	Label(s)	Ref.
Various	April 11, 2025	Digital download; streaming	Original	Columbia	
United States	April 29, 2025	Rhythmic contemporary radio	Original	Columbia	
United States	May 6, 2025	Contemporary hit radio	Original	Columbia	
Various	May 23, 2025	Digital download; streaming	Remix	Columbia	
