= Jessie Murph =

American singer (born 2004)

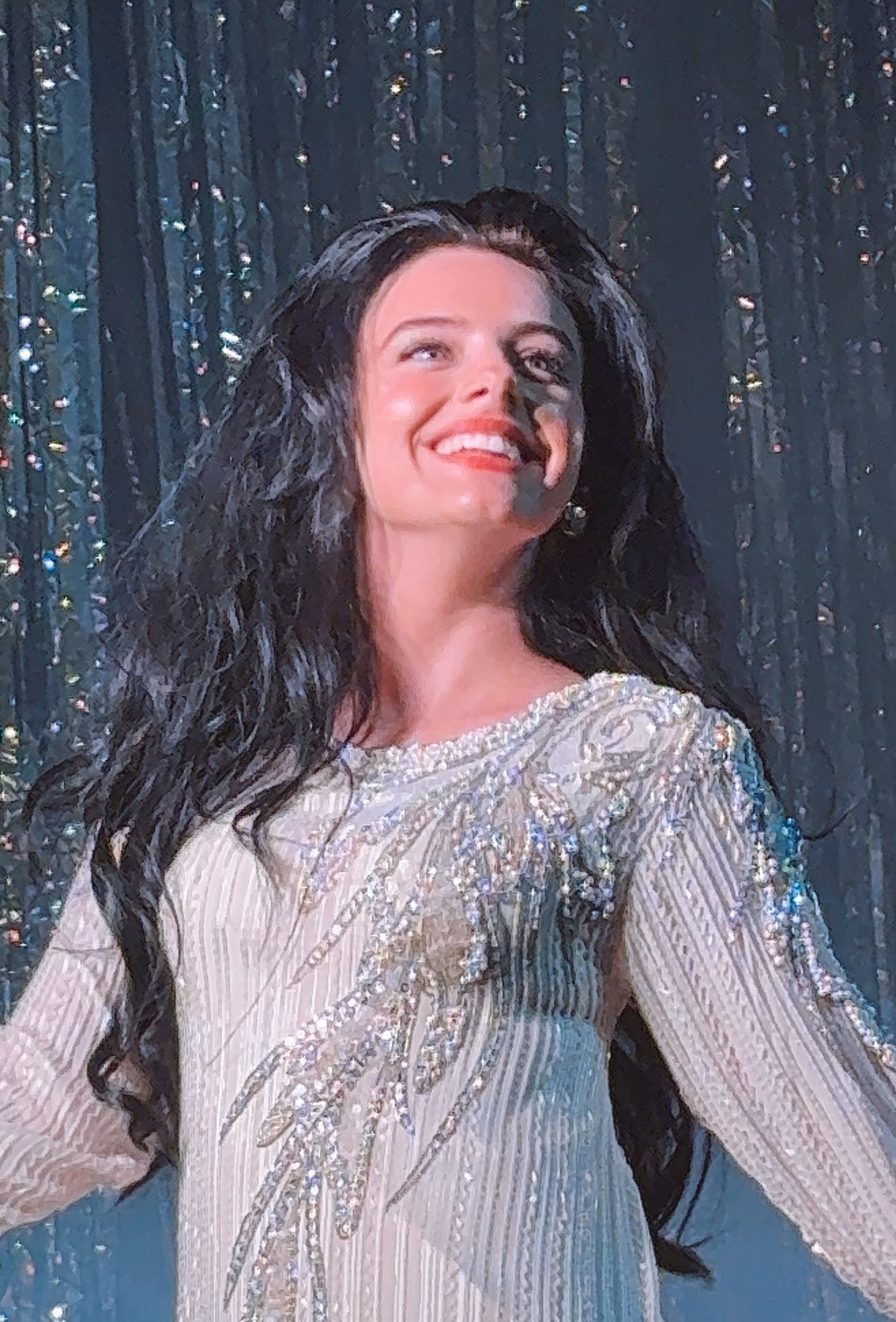
- Murph in 2025

Background information
- Born: September 22, 2004 (age 22); Clarksville, Tennessee, U.S.
- Origin: Huntsville, Alabama, U.S.
- Genres: Pop; country; trap; blues
- Occupations: Singer; songwriter
- Years active: 2021–present
- Labels: Disruptor; Columbia
- Website: jessiemurph.com

Jessie Murph (born September 22, 2004) is an American singer and songwriter. She was discovered after uploading vlogs and covers to TikTok and YouTube. Her music style spans multiple genres, with critics describing Murph's sound as a mix of elements from country, pop, and trap genres, while rooted in hip-hop.

Murph gained popularity with the release of her RIAA certified hits singles "Always Been You" (2021), "Pray" (2022), "Heartbroken" with Thomas Wesley and Polo G (2023), "Wild Ones" with Jelly Roll (2023), and the top 20 single, "Blue Strips" (2025). As well, after working with mainstream artists such as Diplo, Lil Baby, Maren Morris, Gucci Mane, Teddy Swims, and Sexyy Red, among others.

As of July 2025, Murph has released one mixtape Drowning (2023), and two studio albums, That Ain't No Man That's the Devil (2024) and Sex Hysteria (2025).

== Early life ==
Murph was born in Clarksville, Tennessee to musician parents, and moved with them at age five to Alabama. The family first lived in Huntsville, Alabama before settling in nearby Athens. Murph became interested in music at a young age by listening to pop, hip hop, and country music.

Throughout her upbringing, Murph felt alienated from the conservative southern culture of Alabama and got into trouble for the way she dressed and for posting videos of herself online performing songs with profanity. Murph later left Alabama as a teenager to relocate to Nashville, Tennessee and pursue a career in music, before later settling in Los Angeles.

== Career ==
=== 2021–2022: Debut single and breakthrough ===
In 2021, she signed a record deal with Columbia Records and released her debut single "Upgrade". Later that year, her single "Always Been You" was her first to chart. Her song "Pray" charted in the UK at number 66 on March 3, 2022.

=== 2023–2024: Mainstream collabs and That Ain't No Man That's the Devil ===
Murph's collaboration with Diplo and Polo G, "Heartbroken", charted at No. 64 on the US Billboard Hot 100 and was number 52 on the Canadian Hot 100 on August 5, 2023. In mid-2023, she announced her first headline tour titled the Cowboys and Angels North American Tour, which was named after her earlier 2023 single titled "Cowboys and Angels". At the end of 2023, Murph collaborated with Country singer-songwriter Maren Morris on the single, "Texas". In 2024, Murph released her debut studio album That Ain't No Man That's the Devil. which is certified Gold in both Canada and the United States.

=== 2025–present: Sex Hysteria and Worldwide Hysteria Tour ===
In 2025, Murph released her second studio album, Sex Hysteria which spawned several singles including "Touch Me Like a Gangster", and "Blue Strips". The latter became viral on the social media platform TikTok, which contributed to the song's popularity. "Blue Strips" became Murph's highest charting single on the US Billboard Hot 100, becoming her first top 20 single and peaking at number 15. To further promote her album, Murph announced in May that in July she will embark on her Worldwide Hysteria Tour.

== Discography ==
=== Studio albums ===
List of studio albums, with selected details, chart positions and certifications
Title	Album details	Peak chart positions				Certifications
Title	Album details	US	AUS	CAN	NZ	Certifications
That Ain't No Man That's the Devil	Released: September 6, 2024; Label: Columbia; Format: CD, vinyl, digital download, streaming	24	76	29	32	RIAA: Platinum; MC: Platinum; RMNZ: Gold
Sex Hysteria	Released: July 18, 2025; Label: Columbia; Format: CD, vinyl, digital download, streaming	8	12	10	15	RIAA: Gold; MC: Gold

=== Mixtapes ===
List of mixtapes, with selected details, chart positions and certifications
Title	Mixtape details	Peak	Certifications
Title	Mixtape details	US	Certifications
Drowning	Released: February 10, 2023; Label: Columbia; Format: CD, vinyl, digital download, streaming	162	RIAA: Gold; MC: Gold

=== Singles ===
List of singles, with selected chart positions and certifications
Title	Year	Peak chart positions									Certifications	Album
Title	Year	US	AUS	CAN	IRE	NOR	NZ	NZ Hot	UK	WW	Certifications	Album
"Upgrade"	2021	—	—	—	—	—	—	—	—	—		Non-album singles
"Look Who's Cryin' Now"	2021	—	—	—	—	—	—	—	—	—	RIAA: Gold	Non-album singles
"When I'm Not Around"	2021	—	—	—	—	—	—	—	—	—		Non-album singles
"Sobriety"	2021	—	—	—	—	—	—	—	—	—		Non-album singles
"Always Been You"	2021	95	—	72	77	—	—	5	—	198	RIAA: Platinum; ARIA: Platinum; BPI: Silver; MC: Platinum; RMNZ: Gold	Drowning
"Pray"	2022	95	—	70	35	9	—	3	66	137	RIAA: Platinum; ARIA: Platinum; BPI: Silver; MC: Platinum; RMNZ: Gold	Drowning
"I Would've"	2022	—	—	—	—	—	—	—	—	—	RIAA: Gold; MC: Gold	Drowning
"While You're at It"	2022	—	—	—	—	—	—	—	—	—	RIAA: Gold; ARIA: Gold; MC: Gold	Drowning
"How Could You"	2022	— (Note: "How Could You" did not enter the Billboard Hot 100, but peaked at number nine on the Bubbling Under Hot 100 chart.)	—	—	74	—	—	13	—	—	RIAA: Platinum; ARIA: Platinum; BPI: Silver; MC: Gold; RMNZ: Gold	Drowning
"Cowboys and Angels"	2023	—	—	—	—	—	—	—	—	—	RIAA: Gold; MC: Gold	Non-album singles
"Texas" (featuring Maren Morris)	2023	—	—	—	—	—	—	—	—	—	MC: Gold	Non-album singles
"Heartbroken" (with Thomas Wesley and Polo G)	2023	64	—	52	—	—	—	11	—	—	RIAA: Platinum; ARIA: Platinum; MC: 2× Platinum; RMNZ: Gold	Diplo Presents Thomas Wesley, Chapter 2: Swamp Savant
"Wild Ones" (with Jelly Roll)	2023	35	75	42	—	—	—	6	—	112	RIAA: 4× Platinum; ARIA: 2× Platinum; BPI: Silver; MC: 4× Platinum; RMNZ: Platinum	That Ain't No Man That's the Devil
"Son of a Bitch"	2024	— (Note: "Son of a Bitch" did not enter the Billboard Hot 100, but peaked at number 16 on the Bubbling Under Hot 100 chart.)	—	—	—	—	—	13	—	—	RIAA: Gold; MC: Gold	That Ain't No Man That's the Devil
"Cold"	2024	—	—	—	—	—	—	17	—	—		That Ain't No Man That's the Devil
"High Road" (with Koe Wetzel)	2024	22	46	30	—	—	—	8	—	72	RIAA: 4× Platinum; ARIA: 2× Platinum; MC: Platinum; RMNZ: Platinum	9 Lives
"Dirty" (with Teddy Swims)	2024	79	—	92	—	—	—	7	—	—	RIAA: Gold	That Ain't No Man That's the Devil
"I Hope It Hurts"	2024	—	—	—	—	—	—	26	—	—		That Ain't No Man That's the Devil
"Someone in This Room" (featuring Bailey Zimmerman)	2024	— (Note: "Someone in This Room" did not enter the Billboard Hot 100, but peaked at number 11 on the Bubbling Under Hot 100 chart.)	—	—	—	—	—	23	—	—		That Ain't No Man That's the Devil
"Sip"	2024	—	—	—	—	—	—	14	—	—		Non-album single
"Gucci Mane"	2025	—	—	—	—	—	—	21	—	—		Sex Hysteria
"Blue Strips"	2025	15	17	11	63	91	15	6	—	33	RIAA: 2× Platinum; ARIA: Platinum; MC: 2× Platinum; RMNZ: Gold	Sex Hysteria
"Touch Me Like a Gangster"	2025	56	73	49	—	—	—	3	—	158	RIAA: Gold	Sex Hysteria
"I'm Not There for You"	2025	66	92	33	—	—	—	3	—	—		Sex Hysteria (Deluxe)
"Criminal" (from Scream 7)	2026	—	—	—	—	—	—	—	—	—		Non-album single
"—" denotes a recording that did not chart or was not released in that territory.

==== Promotional singles ====
List of promotional singles, with selected chart positions
Title	Year	Peak chart positions			Album
Title	Year	US Bub.	IRE	NZ Hot	Album
"Heroin"	2025	18	—	26	Sex Hysteria
"Bad as the Rest"	2025	—	100	33	Sex Hysteria
"—" denotes a recording that did not chart or was not released in that territory.

=== Other charted and certified songs ===
List of other charted and certified songs, with selected chart positions and certifications
Title	Year	Peak chart positions			Certifications	Album
Title	Year	US	CAN	NZ Hot	Certifications	Album
"If I Died Last Night"	2023	—	—	—	RIAA: Gold; MC: Gold	Drowning
"1965"	2025	84	98	14		Sex Hysteria
"Couldn't Be Worse"	2025	—	—	34		Sex Hysteria
"Sex Hysteria"	2025	—	—	32		Sex Hysteria
"Best Behavior" (with Lil Baby)	2025	—	—	35		Sex Hysteria
"I Stay I Leave I Love I Lose"	2025	—	—	25		Sex Hysteria (Deluxe)
"Forever" (with 6lack)	2025	—	—	24		Sex Hysteria (Deluxe)
"—" denotes a recording that did not chart or was not released in that territory.

=== Other appearances ===
List of other album appearances
Title	Year	Album	Ref.
"Nothing Else Matters"	2023	Fast X (Original Motion Picture Soundtrack)	

=== Music videos ===
List of music videos, with other performing artists and director
Title	Year	Other artist(s)	Director
"Upgrade"	2021	none	Geoff Sean Levy
"Look Who's Cryin' Now"	2021	none	Giraffe Studios
"When I'm Not Around"	2021	none	Patrick Tohill
"Sobriety"	2021	none	unknown
"Always Been You"	2021	none	unknown
"Pray"	2022	none	unknown
"I Would've"	2022	none	Patrick Tohill
"How Could You"	2022	none	Patrick Tohill
"If I Died Last Night"	2022	none	Claire Schmitt
"Drunk in the Bathtub"	2022	none	Patrick Tohill
"About You"	2023	none	unknown
"Where Do You Go"	2023	none	Claire Schmitt
"They Leave"	2023	none	Claire Schmitt
"Cowboys and Angels"	2023	none	Claire Schmitt
"Texas"	2023	Maren Morris	Nicki Fletcher & Mason Allen
"Wild Ones"	2023	Jelly Roll	Thomas Falcone
"High Road"	2024	Koe Wetzel	Michael Herrick
"Dirty"	2024	Teddy Swims	Erik Rojas
"Blue Strips"	2025	Sexyy Red	Jonah George
"1965"	2025	none	Logan Sergei Rice

== Awards and nominations ==
Award	Year	Category	Work	Result
iHeartRadio Music Awards	2024	Social Star Award	Herself	Nominated
MTV Video Music Awards	2024	Push Performance of The Year	"Wild Ones"	Nominated
MTV Video Music Awards	2024	Best Collaboration	"Wild Ones"	Nominated
Nickelodeon Kids' Choice Awards	2024	Favorite Music Collaboration	"Wild Ones"	Nominated
