= Robert Trunz =

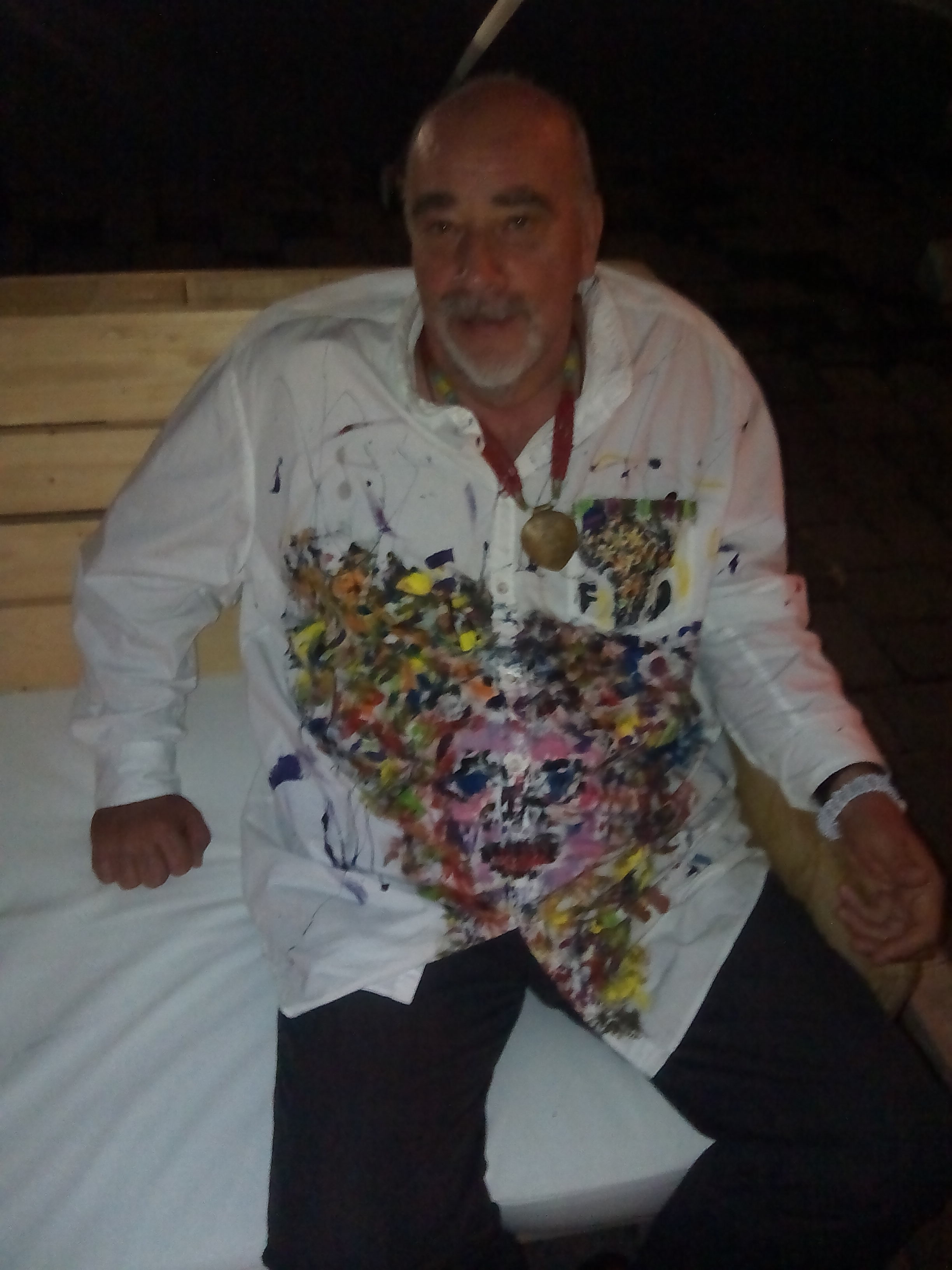
- Trunz at a function in Johannesburg
- Born: April 3, 1954 (age 72)
- Occupation: Record producer,
- Years active: 1970–present
- Musical career
- Genres: Jazz fusion, world
- Label: Melt 2000,

Robert Trunz (born 3 April 1954) is a Swiss born music producer, businessman and sound expert. A Native of Lucerne from the valley of the lakes Seetal Switzerland, Robert Trunz's love for music and sounds was triggered at an early age. His introduction to High End audio came with his work for exclusive distributors of well known Hifi brands in the mid 70’s. In his spare time Trunz helped in organizing a series of Jazz concerts at the Aula in Baden (Switzerland) where he met artists like Ian Carr, Klaus Doldinger, Alphonse Mouzon and Abdullah Ibrahim, Trunz gained retail experience by building up the High End Hifi section of a shop in wealthy Lachen on the Lake of Zurich. It was here in 1979 when he first met John Bowers who hired him as an independent marketing and product consultant. In 1981 Trunz moved to England where he took over the Marketing of B&W Loudspeakers turning the ailing manufacturer into a profit making and fast expanding export orientated loudspeaker company.

== Early years ==
After John Bowers premature departure in December 1986 Robert Trunz became majority shareholder and president of B&W Loudspeakers. This was also the time when he conceptualized and founded the record label B&W Music which later became MELT 2000. Trunz is passionate about indigenous (jazz, world, African) music and has worked with different artists from around the world. Many visits to South Africa has seen him discovering new talent like the late Moses Taiwa Molelekwa and producing for seasoned artists like Pops Mohammad, Busi Mhlongo, Airto Moreira, Flora Purim, Madala Kunene, Brice Wassy, Mabi Gabriel Thobejane, Thabang Tabane, Frank Magongwa, Gontse Makhene, Bafana Nhlapo, Amampondo and Sipho Gumede to name a few. telling

== Music business ==
1987 Robert Trunz collaborated with Claude Nobs launching the "B&W Platinum Music Club" at the Montreux Jazz Festival that later became the Q (Quincy Jones) and expanded into the Miles Davis Hall. Trunz’s initiation of a multi million Pounds research and development project headed by Laurence Dickie, led in 1994 to the launch of new ground breaking technologies wrapped up in the world-famous reference speaker NAUTILUS only to be topped ten years later by the same engineer. At the end of 1996 after having suffered set backs with his health, Robert Trunz sold his shares and left B&W to carry on his love and dedication to music, its recording techniques and reproduction. "B&W Music" became "Melt 2000" with sub-labels "Electric Melt" und "Blueroom Released" with the associated Blueroom Loudspeakers manufacturing the range of POD speaker (now Scandyna). 1997 Robert Trunz assists his friend and engineer Laurence Dickie who also left B&W to work on his own projects establishing his own small research and development lab.

== MELT 2000 years ==
After his move to South Africa in the year 2002 Trunz relaunched MELT 2000 and focused more on Indigenous Jazz, World and African music. Artist collaborations from around the world have been recorded by MELT since its inception in South Africa. The type of music produced by MELT 2000 is influenced by African rhythms and has elements of Jazz, oral history and story telling. With the assistance of Robert Trunz Vivid Audio was born 2002 in Durban South Africa under the leadership of Laurence Dickie and Philip Guttentag. Dic's genius and intense work led to the launch of the proud successor of Nautilus – the GIYA G1 that signaled Robert’s return to a more active role in the company. in 2009 after a personal friend fell victim of crime in South Africa and after being away for 30 years, Robert Trunz returned with his son Nico Tando to his native Switzerland where he formed a consultancy company with the help of his friends Andreas Meyer and Beatrice Pistor to distribute and promote VIVID AUDIO products.
