= Black Coffee (DJ) =

South African DJ and producer

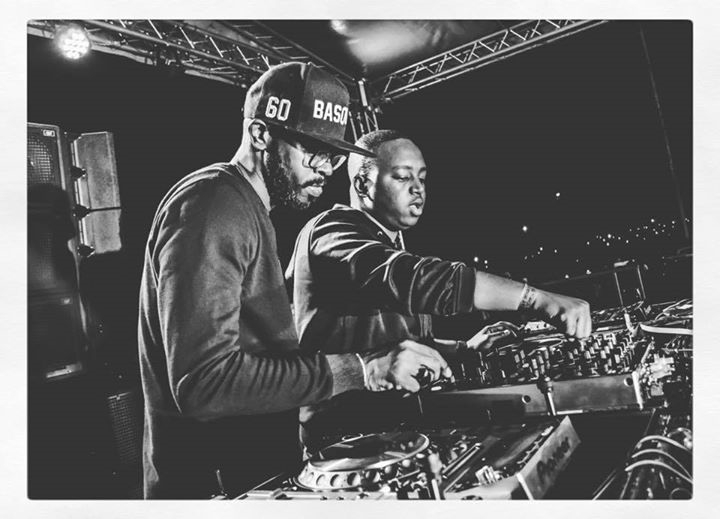
- Black Coffee (left) performing with DJ Shimza in 2016

Background information
- Born: Nkosinathi Innocent Maphumulo; 11 March 1976 (age 50); Umlazi, Natal, South Africa
- Genres: House; Afro house; Afro tech; deep house; dance / electronic
- Occupations: Disc jockey; record producer; songwriter
- Years active: 1994–present
- Labels: Soulistic Music, Ultra Records

Nkosinathi Innocent Maphumulo (born 11 March 1976), better known by his stage name Black Coffee, is a South African DJ, record producer, and songwriter. His accolades include eight South African Music Awards, four DJ Awards, two Metro FM Awards and a Grammy Award for Best Dance/Electronic Album.

He began his career in 1994, and gained recognition for his participation in the 2004 Red Bull Music Academy a decade later. Maphumulo established the record label Soulistic Music to release his debut self-titled album Black Coffee (2005), which incorporated elements of R&B and jazz. He has since released nine studio albums.

== Early life and career ==
Nkosinathi Innocent Maphumulo was born on 11 March 1976 in eThekwini, South Africa. He later moved to Umtata, the town 29 km away from the home of Nelson Mandela Qunu village, staying at the Ngangelizwe township. On the 11 February 1990, while celebrating the release of Nelson Mandela, a car, with headlights off, rammed through the crowd, hitting people in front of Maphumulo, the force of which hit him and left him with a brachial plexus injury resulting in him losing the use of his left arm.

He majored in Jazz Studies at Technikon Natal, now known as the Durban University of Technology, before working as a backup singer for Madala Kunene together with then schoolmates: Mnqobi Mdabe (Shota) and Thandukwazi Sikhosana (Demor). Maphumulo, Shota and Demor later formed an Afro-pop trio called SHANA (Simply Hot and Naturally African) which was signed to Melt 2000, then headed by Robert Trunz.

He was chosen as one of two South African participants in the Red Bull Music Academy in 2003, jump-starting him into the South African dance music scene. His first big break was when his song 'Happiness' was featured on the 'DJs at Work' album.

== Career ==
=== 2005–2006: Black Coffee ===
In 2005, Maphumulo launched his career with a remix of Hugh Masekela's 1972 hit Stimela. Later that year he released his self-titled debut album, and created his record company Soulistic Music. The album sampled songs of notable South African artists like Thandiswa Mazwai, Hugh Masekela and featured Busi Mhlongo, among others. He was well received in the country and was quickly lauded as a "rising star." His album, 'Black Coffee', was created using very basic music-making software. Maphumulo himself stated, "I don't know how to explain the production stages of my album because all I did was put down the basic ideas that I had. I didn't use any MIDI controllers; everything was played with a computer mouse".

=== 2007–2008: Have Another One ===
By Mid-2007, Black Coffee had become recognized in the South African DJ scene with tribal, vocal-laced beats. In the same year he released his second studio album titled Have Another One, which featured "Wathula Nje," a remix of Victor Ntoni's 2004 jazz ballad "Thetha". "Wathula Nje" was later released in Europe together with "Even Though" featuring Bantu Soul through the European label Realtone Records on vinyl and on digital. The twelve-track album featured the likes of Siphokazi, Busi Mhlongo, and Kwaito sensation L'vovo. It also debuted a then 17-year-old high school producer from Eshowe Kwa Zulu Natal, Culoe De Song, who became the second artist to be signed under Soulistic Music. Maphumulo discovered and collaborated with Culoe De Song on an afro-electronic dub titled 100 Zulu warriors.

During this period Black Coffee performed at the Red Bull Music Academy Lounge at the Sonar Festival in Barcelona, alongside recognized DJs such as Little Louie Vega, Alix Alvarez, Frank Roger, Charles Webster, DJ Spinna and Osunlade.

=== 2009–2011: Home Brewed ===
In 2009, Maphumulo released his third album, Home Brewed, featuring Ringo Madlingozi, Zonke, Hugh Masekela, Zakes Bantwini and others.

Between 2009 and 2010, new releases from Culoe de Song, Tumelo and Zakes Bantwini achieved gold and platinum sales.

In 2010, he tried to make it to Guinness Book of World Records when he performed for 60 hours non-stop at Maponya Mall, Soweto. He also won two awards in the categories of Best Urban Dance Album and Best Male Artist at the 2010 South African Music Awards.

In 2011, Africa Rising was launched at Moses Mabhida Stadium in Durban. It included a live band and 24-piece orchestra in front of an audience of about 8,000 people and was filmed for the Africa Rising DVD. That year saw four other releases including Culoe de Song's "Elevation", Sai & Ribatones "Here and Now," Boddhi Satva's "Invocation" and the label's "Soulistic Music Cuts."

=== 2012–2013: Africa Rising ===
In 2012, the "Africa Rising" DVD and triple-CD sold double platinum in a space of a month. Maphumulo featured different artists on the album, such as Bucie and soulful musician Toshi Tikolo on the song "Buya."

In 2013, he performed internationally at locations such as Southport Weekender, Panorama Bar, Circoloco, Boiler Room. He also participated in music conferences like ADE and RBMA in Johannesburg. That same year, he was involved in notable collaborations with musical group Mi Casa and house duo Black Motion. He also became one of the key speakers on his friend Vusi Thembekwayo's tour. In South Africa, he was featured in November 2013 in the Destiny Man edition of Destiny.

=== 2015–2019: Pieces of Me, Music Is King ===
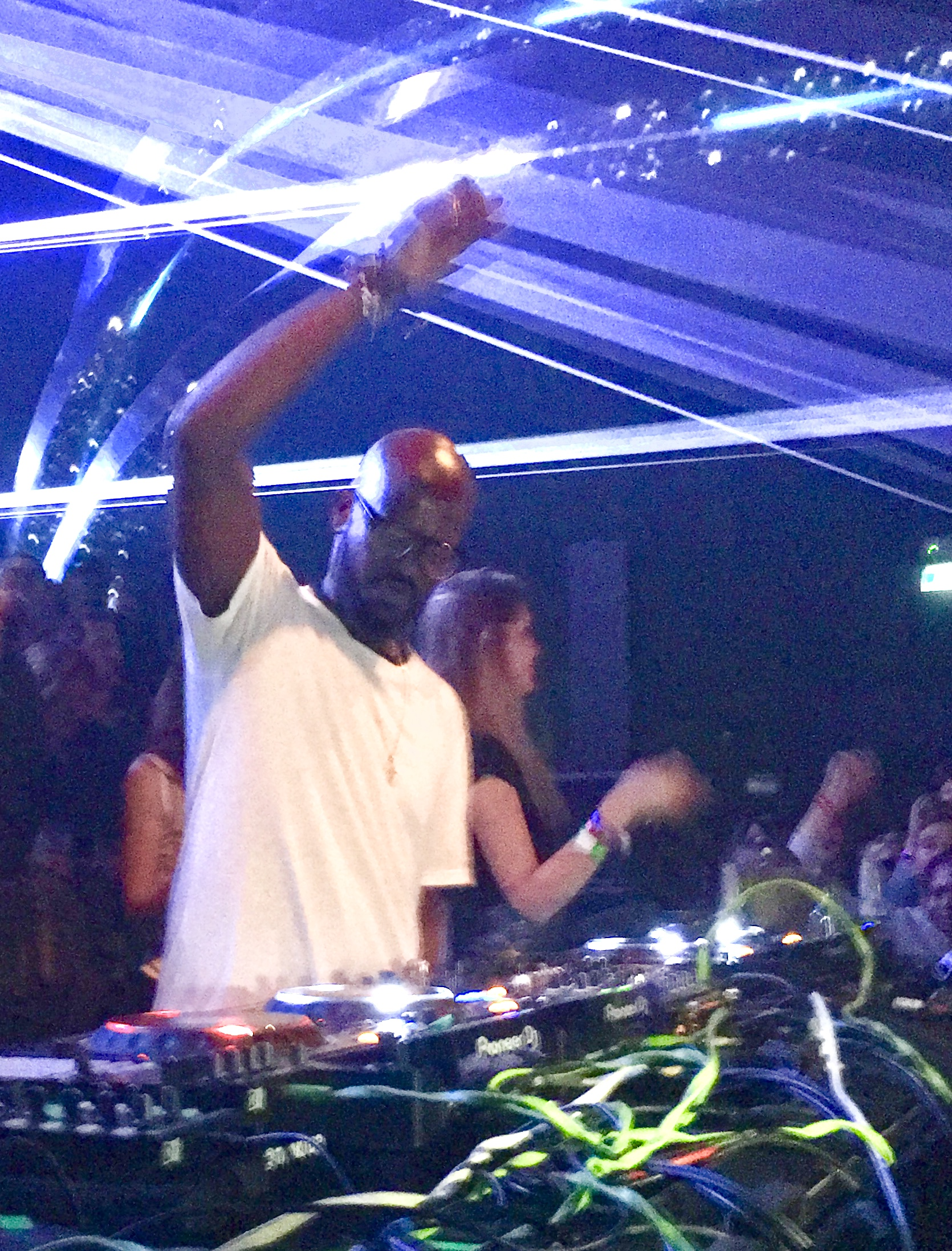
Black Coffee performing in 2018

He began his first world tour in January 2015 at Circoloco, Mexico and it ended in August 2015 at Circoloco at DC-10. That same year, he released his fifth album, Pieces of Me.

Pieces of Me was released in the second week of September and which was certified platinum a month after release by the Recording Industry of South Africa (RISA). It received criticism for its cover and title bearing a similarity to that of the 2011 album Pieces of Me by US singer Ledisi. Musically, the album was widely positively received, with some music critics saying that it was among the best music albums of the year. It went platinum in South Africa in October. On this album, he collaborated with Azola, Portia Monique, Ribatone, Nakhane Toure, Mondli Ngcobo, Kensy, NaakMusiq & Lungi Naidoo.

In 2016, he performed at Coachella Valley Music and Arts Festival and Ultra Music Festival. At the end of the year, he was ranked 91st on Resident Advisor's top 100 DJs list.

In 2017, he contributed to the beat of the song "Get It Together" on Drake's album More Life, which was released in March 2017.

In 2018, he released a single where he collaborated with David Guetta that was titled "Drive" featuring Delilah Montagu. It was featured on Guetta's album 7. At the end of that year, he released a seven-track EP titled Music Is King. The EP features Msaki, Samthing Soweto, Mondli Ngcobo, Karyendasoul, and Zhao. Music Is King was nominated for Best Dance Album, Album of the Year and won Best Male Artist of the Year at 25th South African Music Awards. In December 2019, he embarked on Music Is King Concert to promote his EP, performed at Ticketpro Dome, Johannesburg on 14 and Kings Park Outer Field, Durban on 15.

In 2018, he also performed at Salle Wagram which is Paris' oldest ballroom. The set was produced by Cercle and feature his signature melodic sounds of Africa.

In September 2019, he released "LaLaLa" with American R&B singer Usher.

In March 2018, Black Coffee performed at a sold-out show in Tel Aviv, sharing a social media post that read, “Thank you … I love you Tel Aviv … #soldout”. The ANC, the South African ruling party at the time, criticised his decision to perform in Israel. Black Coffee responded by emphasising his love for his Tel Aviv fans and stated that politics should remain separate from his musical performances, adding that he is not a “political party”.

=== 2020–present: Subconsciously, Madison Square Garden ===
On 5 February 2021, Black Coffee released his seventh studio album, Subconsciously. The album won the award for Best Dance/Electronic Album at the 64th Annual Grammy Awards.

In October 2021, he produced a remake of the single "Too Late for Mama" by Mpho Sebina, which was released on the extended play Music Forever.

Coffee co-wrote and co-produced three songs on Drake's 2022 album Honestly, Nevermind.

Coffee appeared on a collaboration with &ME, Keinemusik "Rapture Pt. III" released on 9 June 2023. It debuted at number 41 on the Billboard U.S. Afrobeats Song charts.

His show at Madison Square Garden was sold out and became the first South African to do so, performed live on 7 October.

On the 31st of July and the 1st of August 2025 Black Coffee will become the first ever DJ to headline an event at the UNESCO World Heritage Site, The Old Royal Naval College.

In August 2025, Black Coffee attended Burning Man for his first time. He played a show at the Mayan Warrior art car. This was significant because Maphumulo had previously been involved in a plane crash and attending Burning Man required that he board a small plane.

== Personal life ==
Maphumulo married actress and television presenter Enhle Mbali Mlotshwa in 2011. They have two children together, while he has two other from previous relationships.

In 2014, Maphumulo was accused of infidelity with a local model. It was reported that a woman from the Free State region was blackmailing Maphumulo, and demanded ZAR100,000 from him to not release a sex tape which verified her claims. In August 2018, the DJ admitted to the affair, which he explained was the result of "being young and being overwhelmed by fame".

The couple was involved in another cheating scandal in June 2019. This time stemming from an Instagram post by Cathy Guetta, the ex-wife of fellow DJ and collaborator – David Guetta, which lead to social media users alleging this was proof of further infidelity from the DJ. Following this, the couple did not immediately respond to the rumors; however, it was noticed that Enhle had removed all pictures of the couple together from her Instagram. Maphumulo later took to Twitter to deny the allegations while also commenting on the way on the "lynch-mob mentality" of the users involved in spreading the allegations.

The couple separated in July 2019, with divorce proceedings beginning later that year. The divorce proceedings continued into 2020 and with them came further scandals. This included the publication of a leaked set of documents allegedly showing some of the financial demands being made by Mlotshwa.

In a since-deleted video on Instagram, Mbali announced that she "would no longer protect" Maphumulo and would be speaking openly about the abuse she alleged to have suffered as well as further alleging that Maphumulo had also emotionally tormented their children. Mbali then announced that she would be a holding a press conference in which she would publicize evidence, text messages and "everything else that was lied about".

In 2023 Black Coffee started dating his current girlfriend Victoria Gonzalez who is a Venezuelan model.

The press conference announced by Mbali would never materialize, but on 12 August 2021, the actor made an Instagram post teasing an upcoming production titled "Voice". This was released in the following September as a docu-series posted to her Instagram in which she recounted her life story. In an interview in February 2022, Mbali shared her reasoning for making and releasing the documentary, as well as expressing her disappointment in the South African Court system and that she believed it had failed her.

On 11 January 2024, Black Coffee was involved in an incident involving heavy turbulence on his plane, while en route to a performance in Mar Del Plata, Argentina, where he was admitted to the hospital with injuries.

In February 2024, he became an evangelical Christian.

In June 2025, through his foundation, Black Coffee Foundation, the popular DJ raised more than R500 000 for the victims of floods in his hometown of Mthatha.

== Discography ==
Apart from singles and remixes, Maphumulo has released the following albums and DVDs since 2005, all under his Soulistic Music banner.

- Black Coffee (2005)
- Have Another One (2007)
- Home Brewed (2009)
- Juju (Remixes EP) (2010)
- Africa Rising DVD (2012)
- Africa Rising CD (2012)
- Pieces of Me (2015)
- The Journey Continues EP (2016)
- Music Is King EP (2018)
- Subconsciously (2021)

== Awards and nominations ==
Year	Awards	Category	Result	Ref.
2005	SAMA	Best Dance Album	Won	
2010	SAMA	Best Male Artist	Won	
2010	Health Magazine	Best Man		
2010	Metro FM Awards	Best Produced Album	Won	
2010	Metro FM Awards	Best Dance Album	Won	
2011	Channel O Award	Most Talented Male Artist		
2011	SAMA	Remix of the Year	Won	
2012	Sunday Times Generation Next Award	Coolest DJ		
2013	SAMA	Best Dance Album	Won	
2013	Sunday Times Generation Next Award	Coolest DJ		
2014	Sunday Times Generation Next Award	Coolest DJ		
2015	DJ Awards	Breakthrough DJ	Won	
2016	SAMA	Best Dance Album	Won	
2016	SAMA	Album of the Year	Won	
2016	SAMA	Best Engineered Album	Won	
2016	SAMA	International Recognition	Won	
2016	BET Award	Best International Act: Africa	Won	
2016	DJ Awards	Best Deep House DJ	Won	
2017	DJ Awards	Best Deep House DJ	Won	
2018	Dance Music Awards South Africa	Best International Producer, Best International DJ	Won	
2018	SAMA	Album of the Year	Nominated	
2018	SAMA	Male Artist of the Year	Won	
2018	SAMA	Best Dance Album	Nominated	
2018	DJ Awards	Best Deep House DJ	Won	
2019	DJ Awards	Best International DJ	Nominated	
2022	Grammy Awards	Best Dance/Electronic Album	Won	
2022	Headies	Best Southern African Artist of the Year	Nominated	
