= Touch Me Like a Gangster =

2025 single by Jessie Murph

Single by Jessie Murph

from the album Sex Hysteria
- Released: June 6, 2025
- Genre: Pop
- Length: 2:43
- Label: Columbia
- Songwriters: Jessie Murph; Daniel Tannenbaum; Jeff Gitelman; Laura Veltz
- Producers: Bekon; Adam Alpert

Jessie Murph singles chronology
"Blue Strips" (2025)	"Touch Me Like a Gangster" (2025)	"I'm Not There for You" (2025)

Visualizer
- "Touch Me Like a Gangster" on YouTube

"Touch Me Like a Gangster" is a song by American singer Jessie Murph from her second studio album, Sex Hysteria (2025). It was released on June 6, 2025, as the third single from the album. The song was produced by Bekon and Adam Alpert, and peaked at number 56 on the Billboard Hot 100.

== Composition ==
"Touch Me Like a Gangster" is a BDSM-themed song, an instrumental consisting of strings and percussion with backbeats The intro finds Jessie Murph telling her lover over the phone that even though they have not known each other for a long time, she will share some secrets about herself that she feels he should know. The first verse depicts her being ready to show her wild side to him, before boldly revealing she likes things such as whips, chains and pain and wondering about the boundaries of their relationship in the pre-chorus. Murph states in the chorus that she does not care if her partner breaks social norms, as long as she finds pleasure in their sex. In the second verse, she believes her interests are mutual between them and wants to know if he is being secretive about his preferences. Murph's signature raspy vocals are sometimes sung at higher pitches in the song. In the outro, she syncopates her words with the beat.

== Charts ==
Chart performance for "Touch Me Like a Gangster"
Chart (2025)	Peak position
Australia (ARIA)	73
Canada Hot 100 (Billboard)	49
Global 200 (Billboard)	158
New Zealand Hot Singles (RMNZ)	3
US Billboard Hot 100	56

== Certifications ==
Certifications for "Touch Me Like a Gangster"
Region	Certification	Certified units/sales
United States (RIAA)	Gold	500,000^{‡}
^{‡} Sales+streaming figures based on certification alone.
