= Sex Hysteria =

Studio album by Jessie Murph
- Released: July 18, 2025
- Genre: R&B; pop-trap; pop rap
- Length: 42:58
- Label: Columbia
- Producer: Bekon; Trevor Brown; Carrie K; Jeff "Gitty" Gitelman; Oscar Linnander; Oak; Pete G; Steve Rusch; Gabe Simon; Keith Sorrells; Vynk

Jessie Murph chronology
That Ain't No Man That's the Devil (2024)	Sex Hysteria (2025)

Singles from Sex Hysteria
- 1. "Gucci Mane" Released: April 4, 2025; 2. "Blue Strips" Released: April 11, 2025; 3. "Touch Me Like a Gangster" Released: June 6, 2025

Sex Hysteria is the second studio album by American singer and songwriter Jessie Murph. It was released through Columbia Records on July 18, 2025, as the follow-up to her 2024 debut album That Ain't No Man That's the Devil. The standard edition of the album features guest appearances from American rappers Gucci Mane and Lil Baby, while American singer 6lack is featured on the deluxe version of the album.

Sex Hysteria debuted at number eight on the US Billboard 200, becoming Murph's highest-charting album to date. The album spawned three singles: "Gucci Mane", "Blue Strips", which became Murph's highest-charting single on the US Billboard Hot 100, and "Touch Me Like a Gangster". The promotional singles "Heroin" and "Bad as the Rest" were also released.

On November 14, the deluxe edition of the album was released, featuring eight new tracks, including the single "I'm Not There for You".

== Background and composition ==
Adam Alpert served as the album's executive producer. The 15-track album marks a shift on Murph's songwriting from her debut album That Ain't No Man That's The Devil. According the album press release, it features autobiographical narratives, "opening up about themes of sexuality, generational trauma and self-discovery with a vulnerability and honesty".

In his review for Variety, Jem Aswad described the lyrical content as straightforward: "as the title suggests, the lyrics are NSFW [not safe for work] and up-front," noting that Murph uses "fuck" at least 36 times throughout the album.

== Artwork ==
According to a press release from Murph's label, the album artwork features Murph referencing the portrayals of 1960s femme fatales, including a classic beehive hairstyle on the cover, contrasting with the contemporary themes addressed in the album.

== Promotion ==
To support the album, Murph released multiple singles along with accompanying music videos, announced an international tour, and made her solo late-night television performance debut on The Tonight Show Starring Jimmy Fallon on July 21, 2025.

=== Singles ===
The album lead single, titled "Gucci Mane"—named after the American rapper—was released on April 4, 2025. It samples Mane's 2009 single "Lemonade". "Blue Strips" was released on April 11, 2025, as the album's second single; it became Murph's highest-charting song on the Billboard Hot 100, where it peaked at number 15. A remix featuring rapper Sexyy Red was released on May 23, 2025. The third single, "Touch Me Like a Gangster", was released on June 6, 2025; its lyrics address themes related to BDSM.

==== Promotional singles ====
In addition to the official singles, two promotional singles were released prior to the album's launch: "Heroin" on June 27, 2025, and "Bad as the Rest" on July 11, 2025.

=== The Worldwide Hysteria Tour ===
To support the album, Murph embarked on an international tour titled The Worldwide Hysteria Tour. It began on July 27, 2025, in Phoenix, Arizona, and included performances in major cities across the United States, Europe, and Oceania. The tour concluded in Auckland, New Zealand on November 22, 2025.

=== Album film ===
On November 21, 2025, Murph release a short film on YouTube titled "SEX HYSTERIA THE END". The 10-minute film was directed by Logan Rice and features tracks from the deluxe digital edition of Sex Hysteria. The film is an exploration of early trauma and familial relationships, inspired by Murph's life. The film is age-restricted.

==== Official description ====
"A true story of love and consequence. The album film. In my own life I've noticed a strong theme of learned love, and confusing pain for comfort. Often being stuck in a cycle of my own making. This film is a visual representation about realising that healing isn't a fix you find, it's a shift in perspective. I wanted to honor the moments that shaped me and the fans who walk through similar shadows. The immense amount of courage it takes to jump, to break the pattern, to choose something better, and to understand that the jump is the only way anything ever changes."

== Reception ==
Jem Aswad of Variety gave Sex Hysteria a positive review, stating that with the album, "Jessie Murph's fireball voice and persona first popped onto our radar almost five years ago, but with Sex Hysteria, she's truly arrived." He further praised her "unique" hip-hop phrasing, noting that it is "deeply rooted in the [hip-hop] genre," as well as her "fierce rhyming skills," which he described as "musically daring". Aswad highlighted that "what's most striking about her style is that the flow and attitude of hip-hop are so deep in her DNA that her verses, even when sung, hit like rap lyrics." He also observed that these elements are more prominent than ever on Sex Hysteria, which, according to him, has "even more sass and swagger than her impressive 2024 debut." Aswad also praised the album's cohesion, particularly highlighting the tracks "1965" and "A Little Too Drunk."

== Track listing ==
Sex Hysteria — Standard edition (Vinyl and CD)
No.	Title	Writer(s)	Producer(s)	Length
1.	"Gucci Mane"	Jessie Murph; Abby-Lynn Keen; Oscar Linnander; Trevor Brown; Warren Felder; Beninu Adolemiui; Shondrae Crawford; Radric Davis; Howard Kaylan; Mark Volman	Linnander; Brown; Oak	2:46
2.	"1965"	Murph; Lennard Vink; Steve Rusch; Laura Veltz	Vynk; Rusch^{[p]}; Veltz^{[v]}	2:48
3.	"Couldn't Be Worse"	Murph; Sam Homaee; Beau Nox	Homaee	2:22
4.	"A Little Too Drunk"	Murph; Daniel Tannenbaum; Veltz	Bekon; Veltz^{[v]}	2:28
5.	"Bad as the Rest"	Murph; Amy Allen; Linnander; Felder; Keith Sorrells	Linnander; Oak; Sorrells	3:02
6.	"Touch Me Like a Gangster"	Murph; Tannenbaum; Jeff "Gitty" Gitelman; Veltz	Bekon; Gitelman; Veltz^{[v]}	2:43
7.	"Heroin"	Murph; Nathaniel Wolkstein; Tannenbaum; Peter Gonzales; Jelli Dorman	Bekon; Pete G; Dorman^{[v]}	4:16
8.	"I Like How I Look"	Murph; Lucy Healey; Rusch	Rusch^{[p]}; Mischa Mandel^{[v]}	2:16
9.	"Sex Hysteria"	Murph; Wolkstein; Tannenbaum; Gitelman; Veltz	Bekon; Gitelman; Veltz^{[v]}	2:58
10.	"Ur A Bitch"	Murph; Rusch; Veltz; Vink	Rusch; VYNK^{[a]}	2:20
11.	"No Chance"	Murph; Rusch; Veltz	Rusch^{[a]}	1:58
12.	"Blue Strips"	Murph; Tannenbaum; Sergiu Gherman; Tyler Mehlenbacher; Veltz	Bekon; Gherman; Tyler Reese; Veltz^{[v]}	2:27
13.	"Best Behavior" (featuring Lil Baby)	Murph; Rusch; Veltz	Rusch^{[p]}; Vynk^{[a]}; Frank Rio^{[a]}; Nova Wav^{[a]}; Veltz^{[v]}	2:52
14.	"Ur Bill Is Big as Fuck"	Murph; Vink; Rusch; Veltz	Vynk; Rusch^{[p]}; Veltz^{[v]}	1:54
15.	"The Man That Came Back"	Murph; Gabe Simon; Carrie Karpinen	Simon; Carrie K	4:01
Total length:				41:15

Sex Hysteria — Standard edition (Digital)
No.	Title	Writer(s)	Producer(s)	Length
1.	"Gucci Mane"	Jessie Murph; Abby-Lynn Keen; Oscar Linnander; Trevor Brown; Warren Felder; Beninu Adolemiui; Shondrae Crawford; Radric Davis; Howard Kaylan; Mark Volman	Linnander; Brown; Oak	2:46
2.	"1965"	Murph; Lennard Vink; Steve Rusch; Laura Veltz	Vynk; Rusch^{[p]}; Veltz^{[v]}	2:48
3.	"Couldn't Be Worse"	Murph; Sam Homaee; Beau Nox	Homaee	2:22
4.	"A Little Too Drunk"	Murph; Daniel Tannenbaum; Veltz	Bekon; Veltz^{[v]}	2:28
5.	"Bad as the Rest"	Murph; Amy Allen; Linnander; Felder; Keith Sorrells	Linnander; Oak; Sorrells	3:02
6.	"Touch Me Like a Gangster"	Murph; Tannenbaum; Jeff "Gitty" Gitelman; Veltz	Bekon; Gitelman; Veltz^{[v]}	2:43
7.	"Heroin"	Murph; Nathaniel Wolkstein; Tannenbaum; Peter Gonzales; Jelli Dorman	Bekon; Pete G; Dorman^{[v]}	4:16
8.	"I Like How I Look"	Murph; Lucy Healey; Rusch	Rusch^{[p]}; Mischa Mandel^{[v]}	2:16
9.	"Ain't But a Thing"	Murph; Dan Wilson; Rusch; Veltz	Rusch^{[p]}; Veltz^{[v]}; Mandel^{[v]}	3:41
10.	"The Man That Came Back"	Murph; Gabe Simon; Carrie Karpinen	Simon; Carrie K	4:01
11.	"Sex Hysteria"	Murph; Wolkstein; Tannenbaum; Gitelman; Veltz	Bekon; Gitelman; Veltz^{[v]}	2:58
12.	"Donuts" (featuring Gucci Mane)	Murph; Davis; Tannenbaum; Jon Casey; Matt Anthony; Nox	Bekon; Casey; Anthony; Nox^{[a]}	2:18
13.	"Blue Strips"	Murph; Tannenbaum; Sergiu Gherman; Tyler Mehlenbacher; Veltz	Bekon; Gherman; Tyler Reese; Veltz^{[v]}	2:27
14.	"Best Behavior" (featuring Lil Baby)	Murph; Rusch; Veltz	Rusch^{[p]}; Vynk^{[a]}; Frank Rio^{[a]}; Nova Wav^{[a]}; Veltz^{[v]}	2:52
15.	"Ur Bill Is Big as Fuck"	Murph; Vink; Rusch; Veltz	Vynk; Rusch^{[p]}; Veltz^{[v]}	1:54
Total length:				42:58

Sex Hysteria — Deluxe edition (Digital)
No.	Title	Writer(s)	Producer(s)	Length
16.	"I Stay I Leave I Love I Lose"	Murph; Vink; Rusch; Veltz	Rusch; VY K	2:58
17.	"Wildflowers and Wine"	Murph; Kurstin; McDonald	Kurstin	4:32
18.	"Easy Sunday Living"	Murph; Rusch; Vink; Veltz	Rusch; VYNK	3:04
19.	"Forever" (featuring 6lack)	Murph; Rusch; Vink; Veltz; Valentine	Rusch; VYNK	3:13
20.	"No Chance"	Murph; Rusch; Veltz	Rusch	1:58
21.	"I'm Not There for You"	Murph; Fedi; Walter; Veltz	Cirkut; Fedi; Rusch	2:20
22.	"Outside"	Murph; Tannenbaum; Ray; Krieger; Wolkstein; Johnson; Anthony	Anthony; Bekon	4:06
23.	"Certain Kind of Love"	Murph; Rusch; Veltz	Rusch	2:59
Total length:				25:10

=== Notes ===
- ^{^[p]} denotes a primary and vocal producer.
- ^{^[a]} denotes an additional producer.
- ^{^[v]} denotes a vocal producer.
- "Gucci Mane" contains a sample of "Lemonade", written by Radric Davis and Shondrae Crawford and performed by Gucci Mane, which itself samples "Keep It Warm", written by Howard Kaylan and Mark Volman and performed by Flo & Eddie.

== Personnel ==
Credits adapted from Tidal.

=== Musicians ===
- Jessie Murph – vocals (all tracks), background vocals (tracks 2, 8, 14, 15)
- Oscar Linnander – background vocals, bass, guitar, programming (1, 5)
- Oak – background vocals, keyboards, programming (1, 5)
- Trevor Brown – background vocals, programming (1)
- Laura Veltz – background vocals (2, 4, 6, 9, 11, 13–15)
- Lennard Vink – strings (2, 14); bass, drums (2, 15); organ, piano (2); synthesizer (15)
- Steve Rusch – synthesizer (2, 8, 14, 15), piano (2, 8, 14); bass, drums, guitar, organ (8, 14); keyboards, percussion (14)
- Marc Huynen – trumpet (2)
- Beau Nox – background vocals (3, 12); guitar, synthesizer (3)
- Sam Homaee – bass, drums, percussion, piano, synthesizer (3)
- Daniel Tannenbaum – piano (4, 6, 13), programming (12, 13), keyboards (12); background vocals, synthesizer (13)
- Nathaniel Wolkstein – strings (4, 7, 11)
- Keith Sorrells – background vocals, programming (5)
- Jeff "Gitty" Gitelman – bass, piano (6)
- Lucy Healey – background vocals (8)
- Dan Wilson – acoustic guitar (9)
- Gabe Simon – bass, electric guitar, guitar, mandolin, Mellotron (10)
- Carrie K – drums, percussion, piano (10)
- Ben Kaufmann – viola, violin (10)
- Jon Casey – drums (12)
- Sergiu Gherman – programming (13)
- Tyler Mehlenbacher – programming (13)
- Frank Rio – drums, guitar, synthesizer (14)
- Nova Wav – percussion (14)

=== Technical ===
- Rob Kinelski – mixing (1–3, 5–7, 9, 11, 12)
- Sergiu Gherman – mixing (4, 13)
- Patrizio "Teezio" Pigliapoco – mixing (8, 15)
- Ryan Hewitt – mixing, engineering (10)
- Mike Dean – mixing, mastering (14)
- Dale Becker – mastering (1–9, 11–13, 15)
- Ted Jensen – mastering (10)
- Oak – engineering (1, 5)
- Steve Rusch – engineering (2, 8, 9, 14, 15)
- Sam Homaee – engineering (3)
- Matt Anthony – engineering (4, 7, 11–13), vocal engineering (10)
- Laura Veltz – engineering (4, 13)
- Jeff "Gitty" Gitelman – engineering (6)
- Louis Remenapp – engineering (10)
- Eddie Hernandez – engineering (12)
- Bekon – vocal engineering (10)
- Danforth Webster – engineering assistance (2, 15)
- Daniel Kamerman-Gilk – engineering assistance (8)
- Jacob Steward – engineering assistance (8)
- Kayla Dewitt – engineering assistance (8)
- Damon Johnson – engineering assistance (10)
- Dan Ballard – engineering assistance (10)

== Charts ==
Chart performance for Sex Hysteria
Chart (2025)	Peak position
Australian Albums (ARIA)	12
Australian Country Albums (ARIA)	2
Canadian Albums (Billboard)	10
New Zealand Albums (RMNZ)	15
Scottish Albums (OCC)	68
US Billboard 200	8

== Certifications ==
Certifications for Sex Hysteria
Region	Certification	Certified units/sales
Canada (Music Canada)	Gold	40,000^{‡}
United States (RIAA)	Gold	500,000^{‡}
^{‡} Sales+streaming figures based on certification alone.

== Release history ==
Release dates and formats for Sex Hysteria
Region	Date	Format	Label	Ref.
Various	July 18, 2025	CD; vinyl; digital download; streaming	Columbia	

Release dates and formats for Sex Hysteria (Deluxe)
Region	Date	Format	Label	Ref.
Various	November 14, 2025	digital download; streaming	Columbia	
