= How Could You (Jessie Murph song) =

2022 single by Jessie Murph

Single by Jessie Murph

from the album Drowning
- Released: October 14, 2022
- Genre: Pop
- Length: 3:07
- Label: Columbia
- Songwriters: Jessie Murph; Gabe Simon
- Producer: Simon

Jessie Murph singles chronology
"While You're at It" (2022)	"How Could You" (2022)	"Cowboys and Angels" (2023)

Music video
- "How Could You" on YouTube

"How Could You" is a song by American singer Jessie Murph, released on October 14, 2022 as the fifth single from her debut mixtape Drowning (2023). It was produced by Gabe Simon of Kopecky.

== Background ==
Upon its release, Jessie Murph said of the song:

"How Could You" is the most honest and vulnerable song I've ever released – let alone ever written. I wrote it about a traumatic experience I had about a year ago. To me this song is what making music is all about. Not only has writing and releasing this song been incredibly therapeutic for me personally, but seeing other people share their experiences, good or bad, that make this song relatable and therapeutic to them is truly the greatest gift I could ask for.

== Charts ==
Chart performance for "How Could You"
Chart (2022)	Peak position
Ireland (IRMA)	74
New Zealand Hot Singles (RMNZ)	13
US Bubbling Under Hot 100 (Billboard)	9

== Certifications ==
Certifications for "How Could You"
Region	Certification	Certified units/sales
Australia (ARIA)	Platinum	70,000^{‡}
Canada (Music Canada)	Gold	40,000^{‡}
New Zealand (RMNZ)	Gold	15,000^{‡}
United Kingdom (BPI)	Silver	200,000^{‡}
United States (RIAA)	Platinum	1,000,000^{‡}
^{‡} Sales+streaming figures based on certification alone.
