= Koe Wetzel =

American singer-songwriter

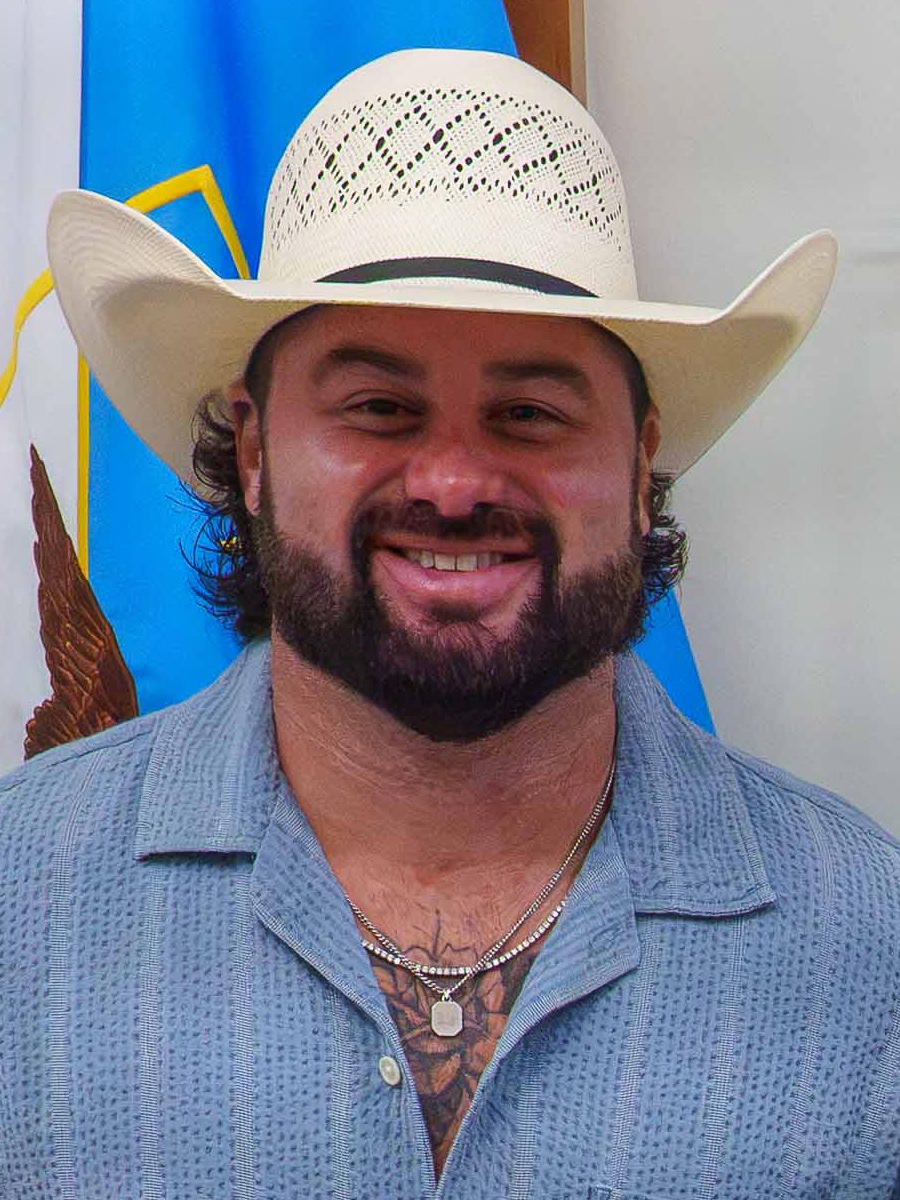
- Wetzel in 2026

Background information
- Born: Ropyr Madison Koe Wetzel; July 14, 1992 (age 34); Pittsburg, Texas, U.S.
- Origin: Fort Worth, Texas, U.S.
- Genres: Country rock; alternative country; alternative rock; outlaw country; hard rock; grunge; post-grunge
- Occupations: Singer; songwriter
- Years active: 2012–present
- Website: koewetzelmusic.com

Ropyr Madison Koe Wetzel (born July 14, 1992) is an American singer and songwriter. His music has been described variously as a "blend of rock and country", outlaw country, and "fusing country and grunge".

== Life and career ==
Wetzel was born in Pittsburg, Texas, with one of his names being a reference to outlaw country singer-songwriter David Allan Coe. His mother was a touring country singer, bringing the young Koe along and his father worked in the construction business. He would perform on stage for the first time at age six. Later, Wetzel was a linebacker at Tarleton State University in Stephenville, Texas, where he decided to pursue a career as a musician instead.

Wetzel formed "Koe Wetzel and Konvicts", and self-released an EP and one full-length album. His "rowdy" music and lyrics became popular among college students and young adults, and Noise Complaint, released in 2016, was considered to be his breakout album. Beginning with Noise Complaint, the full name of the band was dropped, though Wetzel still performs with a bassist, one drummer, and two guitarists. The band signed with Red 11 Music in Austin, TX in early 2018 while being managed by 4-Tay Management out of Stephenville, TX until 2019 when the band signed a management deal with Floating Leaf Entertainment, establishing a joint venture between Wetzel and Jeb Hurt who had previously been the band's agent at Red 11 Music.

Harold Saul High was released in 2019, however sales were strong, and the album charted on the Billboard 200.

In 2020, Wetzel released Sellout, named in reference to his signing with major label Columbia Records.

In 2023, Wetzel became a partner in the opening of a highly successful restaurant-bar and live music venue in Fort Worth, Texas called Koe Wetzel's Riot Room.

== Musical style ==
Wetzel's music is usually described as fusing genres, especially rock and country, while he has been rumored to personally refer to his blend of music as "Hillbilly Punk-Rock". In his youth, Wetzel was exposed to country, hip-hop, rap, and grunge, including the music of Nirvana. In an interview for American Songwriter, Wetzel described his album Harold Saul High as "...90s country meets early 2000s punk rock with early '90s grunge and hip-hop music in the background."

His lyrics often deal with mature subject matter, and are known for containing explicit language. One example is the song "February 28, 2016": a song about drunkenness, and a reference to his arrest for public intoxication in Stephenville on that day.

In 2019, Wetzel's performance at the Great Texas Balloon Race was the subject of some controversy, after some festival goers were offended at his refusal to make his songs more family friendly. Wetzel responded in a tongue in cheek manner, taking credit for breaking attendance records.

== Discography ==
=== Studio albums ===
List of studio albums, with selected details and chart positions
Title	Album details	Peak chart positions			Certifications
Title	Album details	US	US Country	CAN	Certifications
Out on Parole (as Koe Wetzel and the Konvicts)	Release date: January 10, 2015; Label: none (self-released); Formats: CD, digital	—	—	—	
Noise Complaint	Release date: August 17, 2016; Label: YellaBush; Formats: CD, digital, vinyl	—	—	—	
Harold Saul High	Release date: June 21, 2019; Label: YellaBush; Formats: CD, digital, vinyl	65	10	—	
Sellout	Release date: November 20, 2020; Label: Columbia; Formats: CD, digital, vinyl	88	—	—	RIAA: Gold
Hell Paso	Release date: September 16, 2022; Label: Columbia; Formats: CD, digital, vinyl	12	3	—	
9 Lives	Release date: July 19, 2024; Label: Columbia; Formats: CD, digital, vinyl	15	5	54	RIAA: Gold
The Night Champion	Release date: June 12, 2026; Label: Columbia; Formats: CD, digital, vinyl	71	12	—	

=== Live albums ===
List of live albums, with selected details and chart positions
Title	Album details	Peak chart positions	
Title	Album details	US	US Country
Live from the Damn Near Normal Tour	Release date: February 28, 2025; Label: Columbia; Formats: CD, digital	109	19

=== Extended plays ===
List of extended plays, with selected details
Title	EP details
Love and Lies	Release date: June 12, 2012; Label: none (self-released); Formats: Digital download

=== Singles ===
==== As lead artist ====
List of singles, with selected chart positions, showing year released and album name
Title	Year	Peak chart positions										Certifications	Album
Title	Year	US	US Cou.	US Cou. Air.	US Alt.	US Main. Rock	US Rock	AUS	CAN	NZ Hot	WW	Certifications	Album
"Austin"	2017	—	—	—	—	—	—	—	—	—	—		Non-album single
"Kuntry & Wistern"	2020	—	—	—	—	—	—	—	—	—	—	RIAA: Gold	Sellout
"Sundy or Mundy"	2020	—	—	—	—	—	—	—	—	—	—		Sellout
"Good Die Young"	2020	—	—	—	—	—	—	—	—	—	—	RIAA: Platinum	Sellout
"Creeps"	2022	— (Note: "Creeps" did not enter the Billboard Hot 100, but peaked at number three on the Bubbling Under Hot 100 chart.)	28	—	31	25	12	—	—	—	—	RIAA: Gold	Hell Paso
"April Showers"	2022	—	—	—	—	—	16	—	—	—	—		Hell Paso
"Damn Near Normal"	2024	— (Note: "Damn Near Normal" did not enter the Billboard Hot 100, but peaked at number three on the Bubbling Under Hot 100 chart.)	29	—	—	—	12	—	—	—	—	RIAA: Gold	9 Lives
"9 Lives (Black Cat)"	2024	—	—	—	—	—	—	—	—	—	—		9 Lives
"Sweet Dreams"	2024	35	10	—	—	—	—	—	86	40	168	RIAA: Platinum; MC: Gold	9 Lives
"High Road" (solo or featuring Jessie Murph)	2024	22	4	1	—	—	—	46	30	8	72	RIAA: 4× Platinum; ARIA: 2× Platinum; MC: Platinum; RMNZ: Platinum	9 Lives
"Surrounded"	2025	—	49	—	—	—	27	—	—	—	—		The Night Champion
"Time Goes On"	2026	— (Note: "Time Goes On" did not enter the Billboard Hot 100, but peaked at number 9 on the Bubbling Under Hot 100 chart.)	29	—	—	—	—	—	—	39	—		The Night Champion
"Hurts Like You"	2026	— (Note: "Hurts Like You" did not enter the Billboard Hot 100, but peaked at number 2 on the Bubbling Under Hot 100 chart.)	29	46	—	—	26	—	—	—	—		The Night Champion
"Jaded" (featuring Ella Langley)	2026	11	4	2	—	—	—	—	24	5	99		The Night Champion

==== As featured artist ====
List of singles as featured artist, with showing year released, peak chart positions and album name
Title	Year	Peak chart positions				Certifications	Album
Title	Year	US	US Cou.	US Cou. Air.	CAN Cou.	Certifications	Album
"Wasted" (Diplo featuring Kodak Black and Koe Wetzel)	2023	— (Note: "Wasted" did not enter the Billboard Hot 100, but peaked at number 20 on the Bubbling Under Hot 100 chart.)	—	—	—		Diplo Presents Thomas Wesley, Chapter 2: Swamp Savant
"That's Why We Fight" (Ella Langley featuring Koe Wetzel)	2023	—	—	—	—	RIAA: Platinum	Excuse the Mess
"Rocky Mountain Low" (Corey Kent featuring Koe Wetzel)	2025	78	18	4	20		Heartland Rock and Roll

=== Other charted and certified songs ===
List of other charted and certified songs, with selected chart positions
Title	Year	Peak chart positions			Certifications	Album
Title	Year	US Bub.	US Cou.	US Rock	Certifications	Album
"Something to Talk About"	2016	—	—	—	RIAA: Platinum	Noise Complaint
"February 28, 2016"	2016	—	—	—	RIAA: Gold	Noise Complaint
"Love" (featuring Parker McCollum)	2016	—	—	—	RIAA: Gold	Noise Complaint
"Ragweed"	2019	—	—	—	RIAA: Gold	Harold Saul High
"Drunk Driving"	2020	—	—	—	RIAA: Platinum	Sellout
"Money Spent"	2022	—	45	25		Hell Paso
"Cabo"	2022	4	28	15	RIAA: Gold	Hell Paso
"Oklahoma Sun"	2022	—	—	28		Hell Paso
"Sad Song"	2022	—	—	34		Hell Paso
"Depression & Obsession"	2024	—	—	36		9 Lives
"Casamigos"	2024	16	34	—		Non-album single
