= High Road (Koe Wetzel song) =

2024 single by Koe Wetzel featuring Jessie Murph

Single by Koe Wetzel featuring Jessie Murph

from the album 9 Lives
- Released: June 7, 2024
- Genre: Country rock
- Length: 2:59
- Label: YellaBush; Columbia
- Songwriters: Ropyr Wetzel; Amy Allen; Gabe Simon; Carrie Karpinen; Jessie Murph; Josh Serrato; Laura Veltz
- Producers: Mr. Gabriel; Josh Serrato; Carrie K; Ben Maddahi

Koe Wetzel singles chronology
"Sweet Dreams" (2024)	"High Road" (2024)	"Surrounded" (2025)

Jessie Murph singles chronology
"Cold" (2024)	"High Road" (2024)	"Dirty" (2024)

Music video
- "High Road" on YouTube

"High Road" is a song by American singer Koe Wetzel, released on June 7, 2024, as the third single from his sixth studio album, 9 Lives. It features American singer Jessie Murph and was also included on her 2024 studio album, That Ain't No Man That's the Devil. The song peaked at number 22 on the Billboard Hot 100.

== Background ==
Wetzel spoke of the song:

"High Road" is a good example of how this album shows a different side of me than people might expect. Every record's almost turning a new leaf, always a left turn because of how honest I am. But this? It's what the people have been expecting from me, but we hadn't gotten there yet. It's a grown-up version of me.

== Composition ==
Much like Wetzel's previous single "Sweet Dreams", the song combines R&B elements into his style of country rock. The lyrics find Wetzel dealing with a rocky relationship by calming down and using drugs, which he refers to as taking the "high road". Murph sings from the perspective of the woman in this relationship.

== Music video ==
An official music video for the song was released on June 27, 2024.

== Chart performance ==
"High Road" debuted at number 54 on the Billboard Country Airplay chart for the week dated July 27, 2024.

== Charts ==
=== Weekly charts ===
Weekly chart performance for "High Road"
Chart (2024–2025)	Peak position
Australia (ARIA)	46
Australia Country Hot 50 (The Music)	18
Canada Hot 100 (Billboard)	30
Canada All-Format Airplay (Billboard)	8
Canada Country (Billboard)	1
Global 200 (Billboard)	72
New Zealand Hot Singles (RMNZ)	8
UK Country Airplay (Radiomonitor)	3
US Billboard Hot 100	22
US Adult Pop Airplay (Billboard)	11
US Country Airplay (Billboard)	1
US Hot Country Songs (Billboard)	4
US Pop Airplay (Billboard)	28

=== Year-end charts ===
Year-end chart performance for "High Road"
Chart (2024)	Position
Canada (Canadian Hot 100)	97
US Billboard Hot 100	81
US Hot Country Songs (Billboard)	25

Year-end chart performance for "High Road"
Chart (2025)	Position
Canada Country (Billboard)	4
US Billboard Hot 100	55
US Country Airplay (Billboard)	1
US Hot Country Songs (Billboard)	11

== Certifications ==
Certifications for "High Road"
Region	Certification	Certified units/sales
Australia (ARIA)	2× Platinum	140,000^{‡}
Canada (Music Canada)	Platinum	80,000^{‡}
New Zealand (RMNZ)	Platinum	30,000^{‡}
United States (RIAA)	4× Platinum	4,000,000^{‡}
^{‡} Sales+streaming figures based on certification alone.
