= 9 Lives (Koe Wetzel album) =

Studio album by Koe Wetzel
- Released: July 19, 2024
- Genres: Country; country rock; grunge
- Length: 38:37
- Label: Columbia
- Producers: Gabe Simon; Sam Harris; Carrie Karpinen; Steve Rusch; Josh Serrato

Koe Wetzel chronology
Hell Paso (2022)	9 Lives (2024)	Live from the Damn Near Normal Tour (2025)

Singles from 9 Lives
- 1. "Damn Near Normal" Released: March 8, 2024; 2. "9 Lives (Black Cat)" Released: April 12, 2024; 3. "Sweet Dreams" Released: May 17, 2024; 4. "High Road" Released: June 7, 2024

9 Lives is the sixth studio album by American singer-songwriter Koe Wetzel. It was released on July 19, 2024, through Columbia Records.

== Content ==
Wetzel co-wrote eight of the 13 tracks on 9 Lives, with production primarily handled by Gabe Simon.

Four songs were released ahead of the album, including "Sweet Dreams" and "High Road", which became Wetzel's first two songs to chart on the Billboard Hot 100. "High Road", which features Jessie Murph, was released to country radio and debuted on the Billboard Country Airplay chart at number 54 for the week dated July 27, 2024.

== Track listing ==
9 Lives track listing
No.	Title	Writer(s)	Length
1.	"Continued" (skit)	Ropyr Wetzel	0:34
2.	"9 Lives (Black Cat)"	Wetzel; Amy Allen; Gabe Simon	3:24
3.	"Depression & Obsession"	Jahseh Onfroy	2:29
4.	"Damn Near Normal"	Wetzel; Allen; Sam Harris; Carrie Karpinen; Simon	3:44
5.	"Leigh"	Wetzel; Allen; Simon	3:22
6.	"Twister"	Wetzel; Ben Burgess; Steve Rusch; Josh Serrato	3:21
7.	"High Road" (featuring Jessie Murph)	Wetzel; Allen; Karpinen; Jessie Murph; Serrato; Simon; Laura Veltz	2:59
8.	"Reconsider"	Charles Broco; Keith Gattis	3:51
9.	"Hatchet"	Mick Coogan; Simon	3:00
10.	"Sweet Dreams"	Wetzel; Allen; Harris; Serrato; Simon	2:53
11.	"Runnin' Low"	Wetzel; Allen; Burgess; Harris; Simon	3:28
12.	"Bar Song"	Shy Carter; Michael Cross; Dave Gibson; Dernst Emile II; Breyan Isaac	2:48
13.	"Last Outlaw Alive"	Burgess; Harris; Serrato	2:38
Total length:			38:37

== Charts ==
=== Weekly charts ===
Weekly chart performance for 9 Lives
Chart (2024)	Peak position
Australian Country Albums (ARIA)	36
Canadian Albums (Billboard)	54
US Billboard 200	15
US Top Country Albums (Billboard)	5

=== Year-end charts ===
2024 year-end chart performance for 9 Lives
Chart (2024)	Position
US Top Country Albums (Billboard)	52

2025 year-end chart performance for 9 Lives
Chart (2025)	Position
US Top Country Albums (Billboard)	51

== Certifications ==
Certifications for "9 Lives"
Region	Certification	Certified units/sales
United States (RIAA)	Gold	500,000^{‡}
^{‡} Sales+streaming figures based on certification alone.

== Accolades ==
Year-end lists
Publication	Rank	List
Holler	14	The 25 Best Country Albums of 2024
Rolling Stone	5	The 30 Best Country Albums of 2024
