= Subconsciously =

Studio album by Black Coffee
- Released: 5 February 2021
- Recorded: 2018–2021
- Genre: Funk; electronic; dance
- Length: 60:01
- Label: Soulstic Music
- Producer: Black Coffee; Diplo; Sun-El Musician

Black Coffee chronology
Music Is King (2018)	Subconsciously (2021)

Singles from Subconsciously
- 1. "Drive" Released: 24 August 2018

Subconsciously is the sixth studio album by South African DJ and music producer Black Coffee, released on 5 February 2021, by Soulstic Music. Pharrell Williams, David Guetta, Diplo and Usher appear as guest artists.

The album won the Best Dance/Electronic at the 64th Grammy Awards.

== Background ==
Black Coffee began recording the album in the third quarter of 2018.

== Title ==
The album's title was inspired by "SBCNCSLY", a song which features Sabrina Claudio.

== Release and singles ==
"Drive" featuring French DJ David Guetta and Delilah Montagu was released in August 2018, as the album's lead single. The song debuted on the US Billboard Dance/Electronic Songs at number 31.

Subconsciously was released on February 5, 2021.

== Commercial performance ==
The album broke Apple Music and Spotify 2021 records for highest streams, with over 100 million streams.

== Critical reception ==
Professional ratings
Review scores
Source	Rating
Pitchfork	7.0/10

Reviewing the album for Pitchfork, Tarisai Ngangura stated, "Subconsciously isn't the type of album that offers bangers through and through, but the standout tracks are compelling enough to stay the course".

=== Year-end lists ===
Select year-end rankings of Subconsciously
Critic/Publication	List	Rank	Ref.
Billboard	The 20 Best Dance Albums of 2021	3	

== Track listing ==
Standard Edition
No.	Title	Writer(s)	Length
1.	"Lost" (with DJ Angelo featuring Jinadu)	Maphumulo; Simon Oluyemi; Angelos Kotorlos	6:04
2.	"You Need Me" (featuring Maxine Ashley and Sun-El Musician)	Maphumulo; Sanele Sithole; Michaël Malih; Shapiro; Maxine Ashley	6:15
3.	"SBCNCSLY" (featuring Sabrina Claudio)	Lisa Scinta; Michaël Malih; Maphumulo; Sabrina Claudio	6:24
4.	"I'm Fallin'" (RY X)	Maphumulo	7:42
5.	"Time" (featuring Cassie)	Michaël Malih; Maphumulo; Cassandra Elizabeth Ventura; Felicia Ferraro; Jonathan Hoard; McClenney; Ben Shapiro	4:52
6.	"LaLaLa" (with Usher)	David Brown; Maphumulo; Usher Raymond IV; India Shawn Boodram; Mikkel Eriksen	3:37
7.	"Flava" (featuring Unam Rams and Tellaman)		4:29
8.	"10 Missed Calls" (featuring Pharrell Williams and Jozzy)		3:57
9.	"Ready for You" (featuring Celeste)	Sanele; Maphumulo; Ben Abraham; Celeste Epiphany Waite	4:28
10.	"Wish You Were Here" (featuring Msaki)	Asanda Mvana Lusaseni	6:30
11.	"Drive" (with David Guetta featuring Delilah Montagu)	Tor Hermansen; Maphumulo; Mikkel Eriksen; Ilsey Juber; Philip Fender; David Guetta; Ralph Wegner	3:11
12.	"Never Gonna Forget" (with Diplo featuring Elderbrook)		3:19
Total length:			60:01

== Awards ==
Subconsciously won Dance/Electronic Album at the 64th Grammy Awards.

Year	Award	Category	Result	Ref.
2022	Grammy Awards	Dance/Electronic Album	Won	

== Personnel ==
Subconsciously credits are adapted from AllMusic.

- Ben Abraham - Composer
- Aki - Primary Artist, Vocals
- Maxine Ashley - Composer, Primary Artist, Vocals
- C-Tea - Producer
- Cassie - Primary Artist, Vocals
- Celeste - Composer, Primary Artist, Vocals
- Sabrina Claudio - Composer, Primary Artist, Vocals
- Sasha Cron - Composer
- Ry Cuming - Composer, Vocals
- Kevin Davis - Mixing
- Kevin KD Davis - Mixing, Mixing Engineer
- Diplo - Musical Producer, Primary Artist, Producer
- DJ Angelo - Composer, Musical Producer, Primary Artist
- Jocelyn Donald - Composer
- Elderbrook - Primary Artist, Vocals
- Mikkel Storleer Eriksen - Composer
- Phillip Fender - Composer
- Feli Ferraro - Composer
- Gene Grimaldi - Mastering Engineer
- David Guetta - Composer, Musical Producer, Primary Artist, Producer
- Tor Erik Hermansen - Composer
- Jinadu - Composer, Primary Artist, Producer, Vocals
- Shawn Joseph - Mastering Engineer
- Jozzy - Primary Artist, Vocals
- Ilsey Juber - Composer
- King Henry - Producer
- Alexander Kotz - Composer
- Kwes. - Producer
- Lucky Daye - Composer
- Michaël Malih - Composer, Producer
- Nkosinathi Maphumulo - Composer, Electronic Percussion, Musical Producer, Primary Artist, Producer
- Chris McClenney - Composer
- Delilah Montagu - Primary Artist, Vocals
- Asanda Mvana - Composer
- Thelumusa Owen - Composer
- Una Rams - Composer, Musical Producer, Primary Artist, Producer
- Usher Raymond IV - Composer
- RY X - Primary Artist
- Lisa Scinta - Composer
- Shapiro - Composer
- India Shawn - Composer
- Stargate - Producer
- Sanele Sithole - Primary Artist, Vocals, Composer, Producer
- Tellaman - Primary Artist, Vocals
- Usher - Primary Artist, Vocals
- Casandra Ventura - Composer
- Ralph Wegner - Composer, Producer
- Philippe Weiss - Mixing
- Pharrell Williams - Composer, Primary Artist, Vocals

== Release history ==
Release dates and formats for Subconsciously
Region	Date	Format(s)	Edition(s)	Label	Ref.
Worldwide	5 February 2021	Digital download; streaming	Standard	Soulstic Music	
