= Grease: Rise of the Pink Ladies (soundtrack) =

Soundtrack to the 2023 musical romantic comedy television series

Grease: Rise of the Pink Ladies (Original Soundtrack)

Soundtrack album by various artists
- Released: June 1, 2023
- Genres: Pop; rock; rhythm and blues
- Length: 82:06
- Label: Capitol
- Producers: Eren Cannata; Daniel Crean

Singles from Grease: Rise of the Pink Ladies (Original Soundtrack)
- 1. "Grease Is the Word" Released: March 10, 2023; 2. "New Cool" Released: March 31, 2023

Grease: Rise of the Pink Ladies (Original Soundtrack) is the soundtrack to the musical romantic comedy television series Grease: Rise of the Pink Ladies created for Paramount+; the prequel to the film Grease (1978), based on the stage musical of the same name by Jim Jacobs and Warren Casey. The series featured 30 original songs written by Grammy-nominated songwriter Justin Tranter, who collaborated with Brandon Colbein and Brittany Campbell to co-write the songs, while Eren Cannata and Daniel Crean produced the music and soundtrack. Tranter looked back to the original 1978 film and its soundtrack as an inspiration to produce the album and described it as a contemporary take but still capturing the nostalgia and harmonies from the 1950s.

The songs were compiled into separate EPs with each releasing in conjunction with its episodic premiere beginning April 6, 2023. The full soundtrack was released by Capitol Records, on the date of its series' finale on June 1, consisting of over 31 tracks. Two singles—a recreation of "Grease Is the Word" from the original film and "New Cool"—led the soundtrack.

== Background ==
The series' showrunner Annabel Oakes decided for going with original music and songs, as due to copyrights with Polydor Records which currently had the rights to the original film's soundtrack, they could not reuse all of the tracks from that album. Tranter wanted to involve in the series in the very first place as he cited musical theater as an inspiration to his foray into the music. He provided demo pieces to Oakes after which he was roped in for the production of the original songs, closely with Oakes, as the music helps viewers navigate through the time period. The songs had a fluid approach as they were "not entirely vintage, not entirely modern". Oakes wanted to pay tribute to the "real people who started rock'n'roll – black musicians, Latinx musicians, who were at the forefront".

While writing the numbers he used gender-neutral pronouns, they and them, drawing inspiration from the movies as it had a relaxed attitude towards period authenticity, while some songs from the original film did not bother to sound from the 1950s. Tranter explained on the title song "Grease Is the Word" as "a disco song without nostalgia". During their arrangement, they used more instrumentation that sounded from the 1950s, but the song also included contemporary flourishes, with "the vocal being a little more modern" and using "sub bass or 808 drum machines" as a modern element that the original film had.

Speaking to Los Angeles Times, about the song-writing process, Tranter described that the hardest part of writing is "figuring out what to talk about. Most pop songs are about four things: falling in love, f—, breaking up and what I do with Imagine Dragons, which is just sort of like … vague inspiration. In a musical, what you talk about is all there — it's plot, it's character. The only thing to run out of was references so that we weren't repeating ourselves with the same '50s nostalgia."

Tranter collaborated with Brandon Colbein and Brittany Campbell to write the songs. The former served as the songwriter for Jane's (Davilla) songs as he had very "big and bright sweeping melodies" came naturally to him as a writer, while he would also sing demos for the songs featuring the male characters. Campbell however worked with riot girl and alternative R&B, but as she had come from theatre background performing Broadway shows since she was a kid, and also queer, Tranter felt she'd be greater for Cynthia and as well as Olivia, who is from the "sexier side of the musical theater world". Additional contributions were done by songwriters Daniel Crean and Erin Cannata, who also produced the songs. Tranter said that by the time he would write the songs, he demanded that the scripts for at least five episodes were done, so that he could temporary lyrics to fit the storyline.

== Release ==
Two singles preceded the soundtrack to Grease: Rise of the Pink Ladies — the recreated version of "Grease Is the Word" from the 1978 film was released as the first from the album on March 10, 2023, with a music video accompanying the single, featured Marisa Davilla as Jane and the cast performing the song. The original song "New Cool" was released on March 31.

The songs featured in the series were compiled into separate extended plays, with each EPs releasing in conjunction with its episodic premiere, beginning with April 6, 2023. On June 1, 2023, with the premiere of the final episode, the soundtrack consisting the original songs were released digitally by Capitol Records. The album is set to be published in vinyl editions, on June 22, with a "limited edition pink" vinyl also launching.

== Track listing ==
No.	Title	Lyrics	Performer(s)	Length
1.	"Grease Is the Word"	Barry Alan Gibb	The Cast of Grease: Rise of the Pink Ladies	2:52
2.	"Different This Year"	Brandon Colbein; Justin Tranter	Marisa Davila	1:18
3.	"Good Girl Act"	Brittany Campbell; Tranter	Cheyenne Isabel Wells	3:20
4.	"New Cool"	Campbell; Tranter	Ari Notartomaso	2:27
5.	"Different This Year" (Reprise)	Colbein; Tranter	Davila	2:55
6.	"Girl Gang"	Campbell; Tranter	Jocelyn Gauthier	2:59
7.	"I Want More"	Colbein; Tranter	Davila	2:44
8.	"World Without Boys"	Campbell; Tranter	Tricia Fukuhara	2:43
9.	"Same Sky"	Colbein; Campbell; Tranter	Shanel Bailey	3:25
10.	"In the Club"	Colbein; Tranter	Matthew James Dowden	2:13
11.	"Take the Wheel"	Colbein; Tranter	Davila	3:03
12.	"Sorry to Distract"	Campbell; Tranter	Wells	2:51
13.	"Carelessly"	Colbein; Tranter	Davila	2:56
14.	"Pointing Fingers"	Campbell; Tranter	Wells	2:18
15.	"The Boom"	Campbell; Tranter	Davila	2:31
16.	"Merely Players"	Campbell; Tranter	Notartomaso	2:43
17.	"Election Song"	Campbell; Tranter	Jackie Hoffman	2:12
18.	"Girls Can't Drive"	Colbein; Campbell; Tranter	Madison Thompson	2:50
19.	"Finding My Light"	Campbell; Tranter	Bailey	2:16
20.	"High Rollin"	Colbein; Tranter	Johnathan Nieves	2:04
21.	"Hit Me Again"	Colbein; Tranter	Nieves	2:06
22.	"Pulling Strings"	Colbein; Tranter	Jason Schmidt	2:55
23.	"Crushing Me"	Colbein; Tranter	Notartomaso	1:47
24.	"Hand Jive"	Campbell; Tranter	Bailey	2:48
25.	"Land Don't Look So Bad"	Colbein; Tranter	Bailey	2:48
26.	"Face to Face"	Colbein; Tranter	Davila	2:54
27.	"I'm in Love"	Campbell; Tranter	Wells	2:49
28.	"Brutal Honesty"	Campbell; Tranter	Tranter	2:55
29.	"Please Please Please"	Campbell; Tranter	Davila	2:30
30.	"All In"	Campbell; Tranter	Notartomaso	2:41
31.	"Think Pink"	Campbell; Tranter	Bailey	3:13
Total length:				82:06

== Reception ==
The soundtrack received mixed reviews, with Kelly Lawler of USA Today criticised the songs as "forgettable, awkward and lacking in thematic connection to the story". Amber Dowling of Variety felt the songs are "good" but "uneven". Angie Han of The Hollywood Reporter wrote "the vast majority of the songs leave no impression whatsoever, despite the boundless enthusiasm and unimpeachable professionalism of the show's enormous ensemble cast. The musical numbers begin to feel more like filler to sit through than highlights to cherish." Jenna Post of Collider wrote "In Grease — and in all successful musicals, really — the songs serve two purposes; to make the viewing experience more fun, and to reveal the inner workings of its characters and their world. Grease: Rise of the Pink Ladies, is frankly failing at both, and it's preventing the series from living up to its potential. In that way, the songs are the mediocre white men of the show [...] Even the show's best songs don't come close to reaching the bar set by Grease's iconic soundtrack."

In contrast, Grace Wehniainen of Bustle wrote "Not all of the songs on Grease: Rise of the Pink Ladies are new, though. If you're a fan of the original 1978 film, you'll be excited to know that there are nods to it throughout — including in the soundtrack." Jenna Scherer of The A.V. Club wrote "sound like they could be Ariana Grande or Kesha singles".

== Score album ==
Grease: Rise of the Pink Ladies (Original Score)

Soundtrack album by Nick Sena and Zachary Dawes
- Released: June 15, 2023
- Recorded: 2023
- Genre: Score
- Length: 82:06
- Label: Paramount Music
- Producers: Nick Sena; Zachary Dawes

Nick Sena chronology
Cafe Cicatriz (2023)	Grease: Rise of the Pink Ladies (2023)	QAnon Anonymous (2023)

Zachary Dawes chronology
The Big Door Prize (2023)	Grease: Rise of the Pink Ladies (2023)	Downtown Owl (2023)

Grease: Rise of the Pink Ladies (Original Score) is the album consisting of the series' original score composed and produced by Nick Sena and Zachary Dawes, released on June 15, 2023 by Paramount Music.

No.	Title	Length
1.	"New Generation"	2:52
2.	"Later Alligator"	1:32
3.	"Arriving at School"	1:03
4.	"T-Birds"	1:15
5.	"The Clap"	3:36
6.	"Tragic Love"	0:52
7.	"Caught in the Moment"	1:09
8.	"Sharing a Moment"	2:02
9.	"Vicious Vixens"	0:46
10.	"Trying to Fit In"	1:49
11.	"I'm Hazel"	2:05
12.	"A Pink Lady Strikes Back"	1:42
13.	"The Rydell Blame Game"	1:18
14.	"Ok Rebel"	1:08
15.	"The Cast List"	1:56
16.	"Pep Talk"	1:41
17.	"You Guys Go Ahead"	1:29
18.	"Fireworks"	2:43
19.	"Now Hit It!"	1:39
20.	"Today Is Our Lucky Day"	1:41
21.	"Can't Change Your Nature"	1:32
22.	"We're Going to Frostys"	1:50
23.	"That Was Last Year"	2:23
24.	"Grab the Confetti"	1:08
25.	"Use This Gavel Wisely"	1:47
26.	"First Fight"	2:16
27.	"Call It Off"	1:17
28.	"Goose It Jane"	2:11
29.	"Fair Is Fair"	1:16
30.	"Ready to Go"	1:02
31.	"She's a Child"	1:13
32.	"Gil"	1:00
Total length:		53:13
