= Sweet Dreams (Koe Wetzel song) =

2024 single by Koe Wetzel

Single by Koe Wetzel

from the album 9 Lives
- Released: May 17, 2024
- Length: 2:53
- Label: YellaBush; Columbia
- Songwriters: Ropyr Wetzel; Amy Allen; Josh Serrato; Gabe Simon; Sam Harris
- Producer: Mr. Gabriel

Koe Wetzel singles chronology
"9 Lives (Black Cat)" (2024)	"Sweet Dreams" (2024)	"High Road" (2024)

Visualizer
- "Sweet Dreams" on YouTube

"Sweet Dreams" is a song by American singer Koe Wetzel, released on May 17, 2024, as the second single from his sixth studio album, 9 Lives. Written by Wetzel himself, Amy Allen, Josh Serrato, Gabe Simon of Kopecky (who also produced the song) and Sam Harris, it is Wetzel's first song to chart on the Billboard Hot 100, debuting at number 47 and peaking at number 35.

== Background ==
In regard to his inspiration behind the song, Koe Wetzel stated:

I had an R&B type song in mind, like something off Usher's Confessions album, with a badass drumbeat and a really cool melody. I had written in my notes a few weeks earlier: "Sweet Dreams". When we got to the Sonic Ranch in El Paso, we tried it. We stepped back to look at the song and got really excited about the way it came out.

== Composition ==
The production is characterized by an R&B-leaning style, while the lyrics follow a man who is struggling with guilt over breaking a woman's heart and causing the end of their relationship. The narrator sings about having developed insomnia and being unable to have sweet dreams as a consequence of his pain and memory of his former lover.

== Charts ==
=== Weekly charts ===
Weekly chart performance for "Sweet Dreams"
Chart (2024)	Peak position
Canada Hot 100 (Billboard)	86
Global 200 (Billboard)	168
New Zealand Hot Singles (RMNZ)	40
US Billboard Hot 100	35
US Hot Country Songs (Billboard)	10

=== Year-end charts ===
2024 year-end chart performance for "Sweet Dreams"
Chart (2024)	Position
US Hot Country Songs (Billboard)	50

== Certifications ==
Certifications for "Sweet Dreams"
Region	Certification	Certified units/sales
Canada (Music Canada)	Gold	40,000^{‡}
United States (RIAA)	Platinum	1,000,000^{‡}
^{‡} Sales+streaming figures based on certification alone.
