= Teddy Swims discography =

Discography of American singer-songwriter

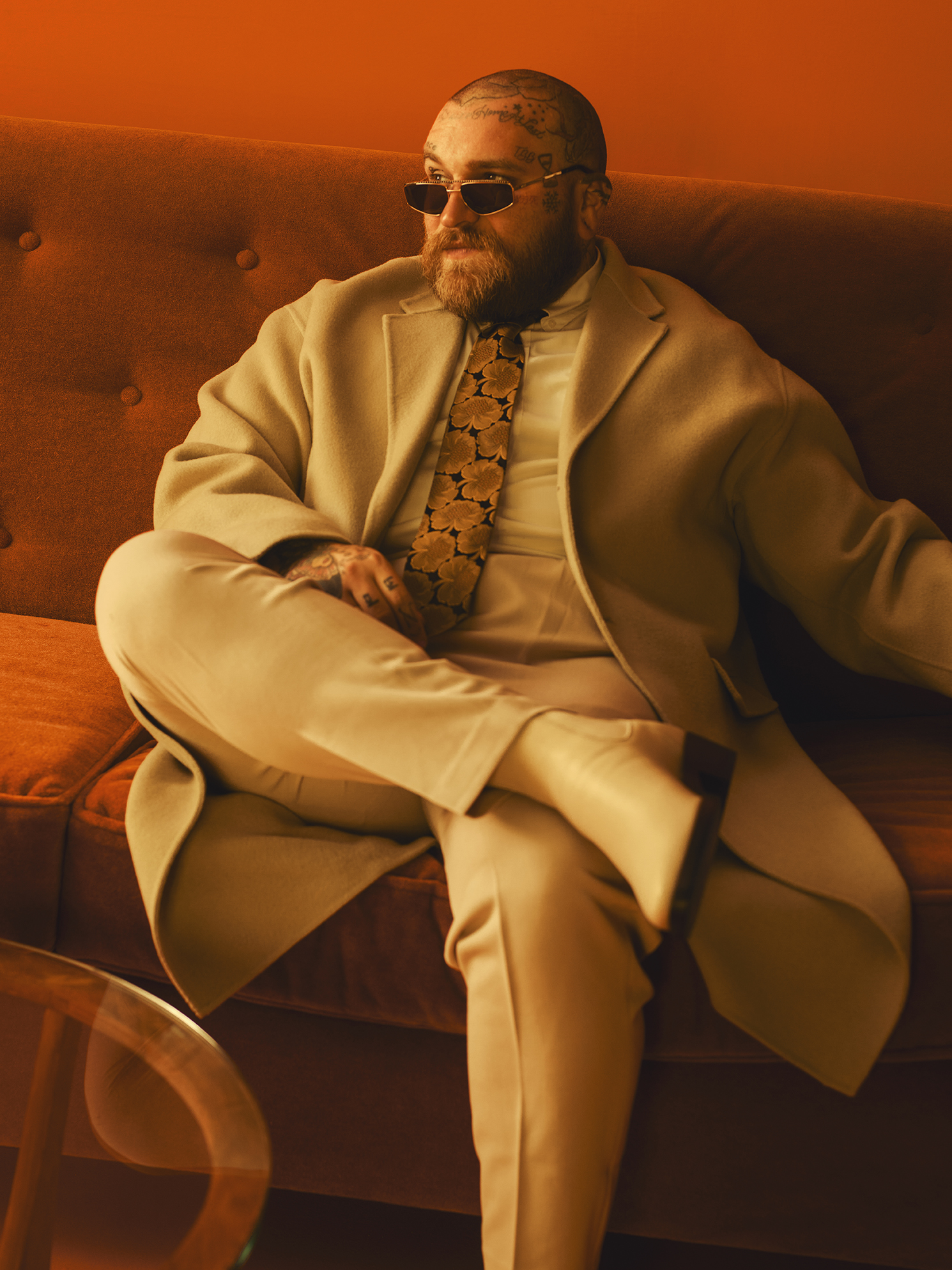
- Studio albums: 2
- EPs: 4
- Compilation albums: 1
- Singles: 47

The discography of American singer-songwriter Teddy Swims consists of one studio album, one compilation album, four extended plays, and 46 singles (including 11 as a featured artist). As of October 2025, Swims had achieved eight million certified digital single units based on sales and on-demand streaming by the Recording Industry Association of America (RIAA).

Swims made his debut in July 2019 with his cover of Lewis Capaldi's single "Someone You Loved". It was not until 2021 where his song first appeared on the Billboard charts. The track "Simple Things" peaked at number 14 on the Digital Song Sales chart. In the same year, he released his first two extended plays, Unlearning and A Very Teddy Christmas, with the former peaking at number 41 on the UK Album Downloads Chart. In 2022, he released two more EPs, Tough Love, which was his first EP to enter the Billboard 200 chart at number 200, and Sleep Is Exhausting, which peaked at number 14 on the Heatseekers charts.

His breakthrough came when he released the single "Lose Control" in 2023. The song became a commercial success and was his first song to reach the Billboard Hot 100, debuting at number 99 and peaking at number one in March 2024. The 32-week climb of the song is the longest consecutive climb to number one of all time. "Lose Control" also became the first song in the history of the Billboard Hot 100 to spend 100 weeks on the chart, surpassing "Heat Waves" by Glass Animals which spent 91 weeks on the chart. The song was also certified diamond in Canada, France, and the Netherlands, and gold or higher in 13 additional countries. In the same year, he released his debut studio album, I've Tried Everything but Therapy (Part 1), which also enjoyed commercial success. It peaked at number 17 on the Billboard 200 and also entered the top 10 in nine countries/territories.

In 2024, Swims released the single "The Door", which peaked at number 24 on the Billboard Hot 100 and received numerous certifications in 13 countries. Later, he released the song "Dirty" with American singer Jessie Murph, peaking at number 79 on the Hot 100. He also released the song "Georgia Ways" with Quavo and Luke Bryan, which peaked at number seven on the Bubbling Under Hot 100 chart.

Swims released his second album in 2025, I've Tried Everything but Therapy (Part 2), which included the commercial hit "Bad Dreams" and the singles "Funeral", "Are You Even Real" with Giveon and "Guilty". The album peaked at number four on the Billboard 200, number one in Australia and Croatia, and entered the top 10 in 12 countries/territories. That same year, he released the compilation album I've Tried Everything but Therapy (Complete Edition), peaking at number 18 on the Billboard 200, which included the single "God Went Crazy". He later collaborated with French DJ David Guetta and Australian singer Tones and I and released the song "Gone Gone Gone".

== Albums ==
=== Studio albums ===
Title	Details	Peak chart positions										Certifications
Title	Details	US	AUS	BEL (FL)	CAN	DEN	FRA	IRE	NLD	NZ	UK	Certifications
I've Tried Everything but Therapy (Part 1)	Released: September 15, 2023; Label: Warner; Formats: CD, digital download, vinyl, streaming	17	4	34	15	9	17	44	2	6	12	RIAA: 2× Platinum; BPI: Platinum; BRMA: Gold; IFPI DEN: 2× Platinum; MC: 3× Platinum; NVPI: Diamond; RMNZ: 2× Platinum; SNEP: Platinum
I've Tried Everything but Therapy (Part 2)	Released: January 24, 2025; Label: Warner; Formats: CD, digital download, vinyl, streaming	4	1	7	11	14	24	4	3	4	2	RIAA: Gold; BPI: Gold; IFPI DEN: Gold; MC: Gold
Ugly	Release date: January 22, 2027; Label: Warner; Formats: CD, digital download, vinyl, streaming	TBA										

=== Compilation albums ===
Title	Details	Peak chart positions								Certifications
Title	Details	US	AUS	BEL (FL)	CAN	FRA	IRE	NZ	UK	Certifications
I've Tried Everything but Therapy (Complete Edition)	Released: June 27, 2025; Label: Warner; Formats: 2×CD, 3×LP, digital download, streaming	18	11	141	24	76	28	5	13	BPI: Gold; MC: 4× Platinum; RMNZ: 2× Platinum

== Extended plays ==
Title	Details	Peak chart positions	
Title	Details	US	UK Digital
Unlearning	Released: May 21, 2021; Label: Warner; Formats: CD, digital download, streaming	— (Note: Unlearning did not enter the Billboard 200, but peaked at number 98 on the Top Current Album Sales chart.)	41
A Very Teddy Christmas	Released: October 15, 2021; Label: Warner; Formats: CD, vinyl, digital download, streaming	—	—
Tough Love	Released: January 21, 2022; Label: Warner; Formats: CD, digital download, streaming	200	20
Sleep Is Exhausting	Released: November 4, 2022; Label: Warner; Formats: CD, digital download, streaming	— (Note: Sleep Is Exhausting did not enter the Billboard 200, but peaked at number 14 on the Heatseekers charts.)	31
"—" denotes a recording that did not chart in that territory.

== Singles ==
=== As lead artist ===
Title	Year	Peak chart positions										Certifications	Album or EP
Title	Year	US	US Adult	AUS	BEL (FL)	CAN	IRE	NLD	NZ	UK	WW	Certifications	Album or EP
"Someone You Loved"	2019	—	—	—	—	—	—	—	—	—	—		Non-album singles
"Night Off"	2019	—	—	—	—	—	—	—	—	—	—		Non-album singles
"I Can't Make You Love Me"	2019	—	—	—	—	—	—	—	—	—	—		Non-album singles
"Picky"	2020	—	—	—	—	—	—	—	—	—	—		Non-album singles
"Blinding Lights"	2020	—	—	—	—	—	—	—	—	—	—		Non-album singles
"What's Going On"	2020	—	—	—	—	—	—	—	—	—	—		Non-album singles
"You're Still the One"	2020	—	—	—	—	—	—	—	—	—	—	ARIA: Platinum; BPI: Silver; RMNZ: Platinum	Non-album singles
"Broke" (solo or featuring Thomas Rhett)	2020	—	—	—	—	—	—	—	—	—	—		Unlearning
"My Bad"	2021	—	—	—	—	—	—	—	—	—	—		Non-album single
"Til I Change Your Mind"	2021	—	—	—	—	—	—	—	—	—	—		Unlearning
"Bed on Fire"	2021	—	—	—	—	—	—	—	—	—	—	RIAA: Gold; RMNZ: Gold	Unlearning
"Simple Things"	2021	— (Note: "Simple Things" did not enter the Billboard Hot 100, but peaked at number 14 on the Digital Song Sales chart.)	—	—	—	— (Note: "Simple Things" did not enter the Canadian Hot 100, but peaked at number 31 on the Canadian Digital Song Sales chart.)	—	—	—	—	—		Tough Love
"Please Turn Green"	2021	—	—	—	—	—	—	—	—	—	—		Tough Love
"911"	2022	— (Note: "911" did not enter the Billboard Hot 100, but peaked at number 10 on the Digital Song Sales chart.)	—	—	—	— (Note: "911" did not enter the Canadian Hot 100, but peaked at number 32 on the Canadian Digital Songs Sale chart.)	—	—	— (Note: "911" did not enter the NZ Top 40 Singles Chart, but peaked at number 20 on the NZ Hot Singles Chart.)	— (Note: "911" did not enter the official UK singles chart, but peaked at number 65 on the UK Singles Downloads Chart.)	—	RMNZ: Platinum	Tough Love
"Love for a Minute"	2022	—	—	—	—	—	—	—	—	—	—		Tough Love
"Loveless" (with Telykast)	2022	—	—	—	—	—	—	—	—	—	—		Non-album single
"Dose"	2022	—	—	—	—	—	—	—	—	—	—		Sleep Is Exhausting
"2 Moods"	2022	—	—	—	—	—	—	—	—	—	—		Sleep Is Exhausting
"All That Really Matters" (with Illenium)	2022	—	—	—	—	—	—	—	—	— (Note: "All That Really Matters" did not enter the official UK singles chart, but peaked at number 33 on the UK Singles Downloads Chart and number 36 on the UK Singles Sales Chart.)	—	RIAA: Platinum; BPI: Silver; RMNZ: Platinum	Illenium
"Don't Stop Believin'"	2022	—	—	—	—	—	—	—	—	— (Note: "Don't Stop Believin'" did not enter the official UK singles chart, but peaked at number 49 on the UK Singles Downloads Chart.)	—		Non-album single
"Someone Who Loved You"	2022	—	—	—	—	—	—	—	—	—	—		Sleep Is Exhausting
"Devil in a Dress"	2022	—	—	—	—	—	—	—	—	—	—	BPI: Silver; RMNZ: Gold	Sleep Is Exhausting
"What More Can I Say"	2023	—	—	—	—	—	—	—	—	—	—	ARIA: Gold; MC: Gold; RMNZ: Gold	I've Tried Everything but Therapy (Part 1)
"Lose Control"	2023	1	1	4	1	2	4	3	3	2	4	RIAA: 11× Platinum; ARIA: 7× Platinum; BPI: 5× Platinum; BRMA: Platinum; MC: Diamond; NVPI: Diamond; RMNZ: 10× Platinum	I've Tried Everything but Therapy (Part 1)
"Some Things I'll Never Know" (Note: The non-duet original of "Some Things I'll Never Know" is on his debut album I've Tried Everything but Therapy (Part 1).) (solo or featuring Maren Morris)	2023	—	—	—	—	—	—	—	— (Note: "Some Things I'll Never Know" did not enter the NZ Top 40 Singles Chart, but peaked at number eight on the NZ Hot Singles Chart.)	— (Note: "Some Things I'll Never Know" did not enter the official UK singles chart, but peaked at number 99 on the UK Singles Downloads Chart.)	—	BPI: Silver; MC: Platinum; RMNZ: Gold	I've Tried Everything but Therapy (Part 1)
"The Door"	2024	24	5	19	6	16	8	20	16	5	31	RIAA: 4× Platinum; ARIA: 5× Platinum; BPI: 3× Platinum; MC: 7× Platinum; NVPI: Platinum; RMNZ: 4× Platinum	I've Tried Everything but Therapy (Part 1)
"Funeral"	2024	—	—	—	—	—	—	—	— (Note: "Funeral" did not enter the NZ Top 40 Singles Chart, but peaked at number eight on the NZ Hot Singles Chart.)	— (Note: "Funeral" did not enter the official UK singles chart, but peaked at number 100 on the UK Singles Downloads Chart.)	—		Bose x NME: C24 Mixtape
"Dirty" (with Jessie Murph)	2024	79	—	—	—	92	—	—	— (Note: "Dirty" did not enter the NZ Top 40 Singles Chart, but peaked at number seven on the NZ Hot Singles Chart.)	—	—	RIAA: Gold	That Ain't No Man That's the Devil
"Bad Dreams"	2024	30	6	23	2	24	8	4	16	6	26	RIAA: 3× Platinum; ARIA: 3× Platinum; BPI: 2× Platinum; MC: 4× Platinum; NVPI: Platinum; RMNZ: 3× Platinum	I've Tried Everything but Therapy (Part 2)
"Georgia Ways" (with Quavo and Luke Bryan)	2024	— (Note: "Georgia Ways" did not enter the Billboard Hot 100, but peaked at number seven on the Bubbling Under Hot 100 chart.)	—	—	—	—	—	—	—	—	—		Non-album single
"Are You Even Real" (featuring Giveon)	2025	59	—	—	—	65	—	89	— (Note: "Are You Even Real" did not enter the NZ Top 40 Singles Chart, but peaked at number two on the NZ Hot Singles Chart.)	— (Note: "Are You Even Real" did not enter the official UK singles chart, but peaked at number 18 on the UK Singles Downloads Chart.)	91	ARIA: Gold; MC: Gold; RMNZ: Gold	I've Tried Everything but Therapy (Part 2)
"Guilty"	2025	— (Note: "Guilty" did not enter the Billboard Hot 100, but peaked at number four on the Bubbling Under Hot 100 chart.)	—	100	16	—	—	70	— (Note: "Guilty" did not enter the NZ Top 40 Singles Chart, but peaked at number eight on the NZ Hot Singles Chart.)	— (Note: "Guilty" did not enter the official UK singles chart, but peaked at number 46 on the UK Singles Downloads Chart.)	—		I've Tried Everything but Therapy (Part 2)
"Sometimes" (with Tiago PZK)	2025	—	—	—	—	—	—	—	—	—	—		Gotti B
"God Went Crazy"	2025	—	—	—	—	—	—	— (Note: "God Went Crazy" did not enter the Dutch Single Top 100 chart, but peaked at number 19 on the Dutch Single Tip chart.)	— (Note: "God Went Crazy" did not enter the NZ Top 40 Singles Chart, but peaked at number five on the NZ Hot Singles Chart.)	— (Note: "God Went Crazy" did not enter the official UK singles chart, but peaked at number 26 on the UK Singles Downloads Chart and number 27 on the UK Singles Sales Chart.)	—		I've Tried Everything but Therapy (Complete Edition)
"You've Got Another Thing Coming"	2025	—	—	—	—	—	—	—	— (Note: "You've Got Another Thing Coming" did not enter the NZ Top 40 Singles Chart, but peaked at number 25 on the NZ Hot Singles Chart.)	—	—		Nobody Wants This Season 2: The Soundtrack
"Gone Gone Gone" (with David Guetta and Tones and I)	2025	51	9	85	5	15	—	24	— (Note: "Gone Gone Gone" did not enter the NZ Top 40 Singles Chart, but peaked at number two on the NZ Hot Singles Chart.)	47	— (Note: "Gone Gone Gone" did not enter the Billboard Global 200, but peaked at number 180 on the on the Billboard Global Excl. US chart.)	BPI: Silver; MC: Gold; RMNZ: Gold	Non-album single
"Mr. Know It All"	2026	22	8	65	4	28	46	17	— (Note: "Mr. Know It All" did not enter the NZ Top 40 Singles Chart, but peaked at number 4 on the NZ Hot Singles Chart.)	54	182	MC: Gold; RMNZ: Gold	Ugly
"Break Up in Reverse"	2026	—	—	—	35	—	—	—	— (Note: "Break Up in Reverse" did not enter the NZ Top 40 Singles Chart, but peaked at number 2 on the NZ Hot Singles Chart.)	— (Note: "Break Up in Reverse" did not enter the UK singles chart, but peaked at number 32 on the UK Singles Sales Chart.)	—		Ugly
"Perfect Man"	2026	—	—	—	29	—	—	— (Note: "Perfect Man" did not enter the Dutch Single Top 100 chart, but peaked at number 26 on the Dutch Single Tip chart.)	— (Note: "Perfect Man" did not enter the NZ Top 40 Singles Chart, but peaked at number 15 on the NZ Hot Singles Chart.)	— (Note: "Perfect Man" did not enter the UK singles chart, but peaked at number 28 on the UK Singles Sales Chart.)	—		Ugly
"—" denotes a recording that did not chart in that territory.

=== As featured artist ===
Title	Year	Peak chart positions								Certifications	Album or EP
Title	Year	US	US AC	US Adult	US Dance	US R&B/ HH	CAN	NZ Hot	UK	Certifications	Album or EP
"Elephant in the Room" (Mitchell Tenpenny featuring Teddy Swims)	2022	—	—	—	—	—	—	—	—		This Is the Heavy
"Bad for Me" (Meghan Trainor featuring Teddy Swims)	2022	— (Note: "Bad for Me" did not enter the Billboard Hot 100, but peaked at number 13 on the Digital Song Sales chart.)	25	15	—	—	— (Note: "Bad for Me" did not enter the Canadian Hot 100, but peaked at number 32 on the Canadian Digital Song Sales chart.)	19	— (Note: "Bad for Me" did not enter the official UK singles chart, but peaked at number 57 on the UK Singles Downloads Chart and number 59 on the UK Singles Sales Chart.)	RMNZ: Gold	Takin' It Back
"Better" (MK and Burns featuring Teddy Swims)	2022	—	—	—	— (Note: "Better" did not enter the Hot Dance/Electronic Songs chart, but peaked at number six on the Dance/Mix Show Airplay chart.)	—	—	23	89		Non-album single
"Easy to Love" (Armin Van Buuren and Matoma featuring Teddy Swims)	2023	—	—	—	34	—	—	—	—		Feel Again
"Face Myself" (Elley Duhé featuring Teddy Swims)	2023	—	—	—	—	—	—	—	—		Non-album singles
"Happy People" (X Ambassadors with Teddy Swims and Jac Ross)	2023	—	—	—	—	—	—	—	—		Non-album singles
"Somethin' 'Bout a Woman" (Thomas Rhett featuring Teddy Swims)	2024	65	—	—	—	—	95	16	—	RIAA: Platinum	About a Woman (From a Small Town)
"So Contagious" (Acceptance featuring Teddy Swims)	2025	—	—	—	—	—	—	—	—		Phantoms/Twenty
"Allegedly" (Summer Walker featuring Teddy Swims)	2025	— (Note: "Allegedly" did not enter the Billboard Hot 100, but peaked at number 17 on the Bubbling Under Hot 100 chart.)	—	—	—	40	—	—	—		Finally Over It
"Won't He Do It" (Voices of Fire featuring Teddy Swims)	2026	—	—	—	—	—	—	—	—		Ophanium
"Keeper" (Giveon featuring Teddy Swims)	2026	—	—	—	—	—	—	21	—		Beloved: Act II
"—" denotes a recording that did not chart in that territory.

=== Promotional singles ===
Title	Year	Peak chart positions				Certifications	Album or EP
Title	Year	NZ Hot	SWE Heat.	UK Digital	UK Sales	Certifications	Album or EP
"Hammer to the Heart"	2024	9	13	29	32	BPI: Silver; MC: Gold; RMNZ: Gold	I've Tried Everything but Therapy (Part 2)

== Other charted songs ==
Title	Year	Peak chart positions						Album or EP
Title	Year	US R&B/ HH	CAN AC	CAN Hot AC	LBN Eng.	NZ Hot	UK Sales	Album or EP
"This Christmas"	2021	—	20	—	—	—	—	A Very Teddy Christmas
"Have Yourself a Merry Little Christmas"	2021	—	15	38	—	—	—	A Very Teddy Christmas
"Please Come Home for Christmas"	2021	—	9	—	—	—	—	A Very Teddy Christmas
"Not Your Man"	2025	—	—	—	—	21	75	I've Tried Everything but Therapy (Part 2)
"Your Kind of Crazy"	2025	—	—	—	—	26	—	I've Tried Everything but Therapy (Part 2)
"She Got It" (featuring Coco Jones and GloRilla)	2025	— (Note: "She Got It" did not enter the Billboard Hot R&B/Hip-Hop Songs chart, but peaked at number 22 on the Hot R&B Songs chart.)	—	—	—	22	—	I've Tried Everything but Therapy (Part 2)
"Black & White" (featuring Muni Long)	2025	— (Note: "Black & White" did not enter the Billboard Hot R&B/Hip-Hop Songs chart, but peaked at number 25 on the Hot R&B Songs chart.)	—	—	—	—	—	I've Tried Everything but Therapy (Part 2)
"Northern Lights"	2025	—	—	—	—	—	99	I've Tried Everything but Therapy (Part 2)
"All Gas No Brakes" (with BigXthaPlug)	2025	36	—	—	19	20	—	I've Tried Everything but Therapy (Complete Edition)
"Need You More"	2025	—	—	—	—	22	—	I've Tried Everything but Therapy (Complete Edition)
"—" denotes a recording that did not chart in that territory.
