= I've Tried Everything but Therapy =

2025 compilation album by Teddy Swims

Compilation album by Teddy Swims
- Released: June 27, 2025
- Recorded: 2022–2025
- Length: 98:08
- Label: Warner

Teddy Swims chronology
I've Tried Everything but Therapy (Part 2) (2025)	I've Tried Everything but Therapy (2025)	Ugly (2027)

Singles from I've Tried Everything but Therapy
- 1. "God Went Crazy" Released: June 6, 2025

I've Tried Everything but Therapy, also known as I've Tried Everything but Therapy (Complete Edition), is a 32-song compilation album by American singer and songwriter Teddy Swims, with both Part 1 and Part 2 of I've Tried Everything but Therapy included, alongside six new tracks. Upon announcement, Swims said, "None of this would have been possible without you. Thank you for letting me trauma dump, thank you for showing up to shows, thank you for listening[, and] thank you to the writers who put countless hours and effort into helping me find my voice."

The album was released on June 27, 2025.

In November 2025, a box set was released including all 32 songs across 3 LPs and a bonus 10-track live album.

== Track listing ==
I've Tried Everything but Therapy disc one
No.	Title	Writer(s)	Producer(s)	Length
1.	"Some Things I'll Never Know"	Jaten Dimsdale; John Ryan; Eli Teplin; Sherwyn Nicholls; Joshua Coleman; Julian Bunetta; Kendrick Nicholls	Bunetta^{[p]}; Teplin; Shweez	4:02
2.	"Lose Control"	Coleman; Bunetta; Dimsdale; Mikky Ekko; Marco Rodriguez	Ammo; Bunetta^{[p]}; Infamous^{[c]}	3:30
3.	"What More Can I Say"	Dimsdale; Andrew Wells; Boy Matthews; Sean Douglas	Wells; Khari Mateen^{[a]}	2:21
4.	"The Door"	Coleman; Bunetta; Ryan; Dimsdale; Ekko; S. Nicholls	Bunetta^{[p]}; Ammo^{[p]}	3:32
5.	"Goodbye's Been Good to You"	Dimsdale; Marc Scibilia; Dallas Wilson; Austin Ruffin	Scibilia; Wells	2:44
6.	"Last Communion"	Andrew Jackson; Duck Blackwell; Dimsdale	Jackson; Blackwell	3:37
7.	"You Still Get to Me"	Dimsdale; Tommy Lee James; Douglas; Stuart Crichton	Crichton	3:28
8.	"Suitcase"	Ryan; Ekko; Coleman; Dimsdale	Ryan^{[p]}	2:48
9.	"Flame"	Ryan; Mags Duval; Steph Jones	Ryan	2:24
10.	"Evergreen"	Ryan; Dimsdale; K. Nicholls; S. Nicholls; Teplin	Ryan; Teplin; Kendo	2:46
11.	"Apple Juice"	Dimsdale; Bunetta; Delacey; Ido Zmishlany	Bunetta; Zmishlany	3:02
12.	"Tell Me"	Dimsdale; Block; Bunetta; Ryan	Bunetta; Ryan; Zara	2:56
13.	"Growing Up Is Getting Old"	Dimsdale; Block; Bunetta; Jones; K. Nicholls	Bunetta; Two Fresh	2:27
Total length:				39:37

I've Tried Everything but Therapy disc two
No.	Title	Writer(s)	Producer(s)	Length
1.	"Not Your Man"	Jaten Dimsdale; Feli Ferraro; John Sudduth; Joshua Coleman; Julian Bunetta; Rocky Block	Ammo; Bunetta; Zara	3:37
2.	"Funeral"	Dimsdale; Bunetta; Sudduth; Jon Green; Whitney Phillips	Bunetta; Green; Zara	3:54
3.	"Your Kind of Crazy"	Dimsdale; Bunetta; Sudduth; Jeff Gitelman; Marcus Lomax	Bunetta; Gitelman	3:02
4.	"Bad Dreams"	Dimsdale; Block; Bunetta; Sudduth; John Ryan; Matt Zara; Sarah Solovay	Bunetta; Ryan; Zara	3:04
5.	"Are You Even Real" (featuring Giveon)	Dimsdale; Bunetta; Solovay; Abby Keen; Giveon Dezmann Evans; Lawson; Peter Thomas; Sean Kennedy; TaeJaun Ellis	Bunetta; Thomas	2:27
6.	"Black & White" (featuring Muni Long)	Dimsdale; Gitelman; Sudduth; Charlie Coffeen; Priscilla Renea	Gitelman; Long	3:00
7.	"Northern Lights"	Dimsdale; Bunetta; Coleman; Ferraro; Andrew Haas; Ian Franzino; Steph Jones	Bunetta; Daniel Tashian; Ian Fitchuk	3:35
8.	"Guilty"	Dimsdale; Bunetta; Gitelman; Lomax; Ryan	Bunetta; Gitelman; Ryan	2:56
9.	"It Ain’t Easy"	Ryan; Amy Allen; Jonathan Hoskins	Bunetta; Hoskins; Ryan	4:05
10.	"If You Ever Change Your Mind"	Dimsdale; Bunetta; Franzino; Haas; Sudduth; Zara	Bunetta; Zara	2:01
11.	"She Got It" (featuring Coco Jones and GloRilla)	Dimsdale; Courtney Jones; Gloria Woods; Hidde Ament; Jasper Harris; Leven Kali; Mikkel Eriksen; Sara Diamond; Tor Hermansen	Ament; Bunetta; Harris; Stargate (co.)	3:11
12.	"Hammer to the Heart"	Dimsdale; Block; Bunetta; Sudduth; Zara	Bunetta; Zara	3:12
13.	"She Loves the Rain"	Dimsdale; Block; Bunetta; Gitelman; Ryan	Bunetta; Gitelman; Ryan	2:39
14.	"Need You More"			3:10
15.	"God Went Crazy"			3:03
16.	"Free Drugs"			3:13
17.	"Small Hands" (featuring Raiche)			2:37
18.	"Dancing with Your Ghost"			2:57
19.	"All Gas No Brakes" (featuring BigXthaPlug)			2:43
Total length:				58:31; 98:08

== Charts ==
=== Weekly charts ===
Weekly chart performance for I've Tried Everything but Therapy (Complete Edition)
Chart (2025–2026)	Peak position
Australian Albums (ARIA)	11
Belgian Albums (Ultratop Flanders)	141
Belgian Albums (Ultratop Wallonia)	161
Canadian Albums (Billboard)	24
Croatian International Albums (HDU)	25
French Albums (SNEP)	71
Irish Albums (Official Charts)	28
New Zealand Albums (RMNZ)	5
Portuguese Albums (AFP)	107
UK Albums (Official Charts)	13
US Billboard 200	18

=== Year-end charts ===
Year-end chart performance for I've Tried Everything but Therapy (Complete Edition)
Chart (2025)	Position
UK Albums (OCC)	95

== Certifications ==
Certifications for I've Tried Everything but Therapy (Complete Edition)
Region	Certification	Certified units/sales
Austria (IFPI Austria)	Gold	7,500^{‡}
Canada (Music Canada)	4× Platinum	320,000^{‡}
New Zealand (RMNZ)	2× Platinum	30,000^{‡}
United Kingdom (BPI)	Gold	100,000^{‡}
^{‡} Sales+streaming figures based on certification alone.
