= What More Can I Say (disambiguation) =

"What More Can I Say" is a song from Jay-Z's 2003 The Black Album

What More Can I Say may also refer to:

== Music ==
- "What More Can I Say," mashup of Jay-Z's song and The Beatles' "While My Guitar Gently Weeps" from Danger Mouse's 2004 The Grey Album
- "What More Can I Say," a song by Teddy Swims from his album I've Tried Everything but Therapy (Part 1)
- What More Can I Say?, the debut studio album by American hip hop duo Audio Two
- "What More Can I Say," a song by Nina Simone, the b-side to "Four Women" from her album Wild Is the Wind
- "What More Can I Say?," a song by William Finn from the 1992 musical Falsettos
- "What More Can I Say?," a song by Carl Wilson from the 1983 album Youngblood
- "What More Can I Say?," a single by Bronski Beat released in 1993
- "What More Can I Say," a song written by Gary Valenciano and recorded by Kyla on her 2004 album Not Your Ordinary Girl

== See also ==
- What More Can I Ask?, a popular jazz song written in 1932 by A. E. Wilkins and Ray Noble
