= Bad Dreams (song) =

Single by Teddy Swims

from the album I've Tried Everything but Therapy (Part 2)
- Released: September 13, 2024
- Genre: Pop-soul; pop rock
- Length: 3:04
- Label: Warner
- Songwriters: Jaten Dimsdale; John Ryan; John Sudduth; Julian Bunetta; Matt Zara; Rocky Block; Sarah Solovay
- Producers: Julian Bunetta; Matt Zara; John Ryan

Teddy Swims singles chronology
| "Dirty" (2024) | "Bad Dreams" (2024) | "Georgia Ways" (2024) |

Music video
- "Bad Dreams" on YouTube

"Bad Dreams" is a song by American singer-songwriter Teddy Swims. It was released on September 13, 2024, through Warner Records as the first single from his second studio album, I've Tried Everything but Therapy (Part 2) (2025). "Bad Dreams" follows the commercially successful singles "Lose Control" and "The Door".

== Background and composition ==
"Bad Dreams" was released on the heels of a performance at the 2024 MTV Video Music Awards, where Swims performed a medley of "Lose Control", "The Door" and a cover of "Stay" (2012) by Rihanna and the song's co-writer Mikky Ekko. The song talks about "deep feelings" coming from a place of heartbreak and pain that leads to disorientation and insomnia.

== Critical reception ==
Ana Escobar Rivas of Los 40 thought the song contains the "soul essence" of all his worst nightmares as well as suffering "from insomnia" due to sleeping without his lover at night. Britt Mae at Melodic opined that Swims released a "fiery new single" that "builds on the momentum" of his previous global hits.

== Live performances ==
Teddy Swims performed the song at the Jingle Bell Ball and 2024 Billboard Music Awards in December 2024 and on The Tonight Show Starring Jimmy Fallon and The Howard Stern Show in January 2025. On 1 March 2025, he performed the track at the Brit Awards 2025 in a medley with "The Door" & "Lose Control".

Swims opened his set with Bad Dreams as the pre-game entertainment at the 2025 NRL Grand Final in Sydney, Australia on 5 October 2025.

== Track listing ==
Digital download/streaming

1. "Bad Dreams" – 3:04

Digital download/streaming – acoustic version

1. "Bad Dreams" (acoustic) – 2:56

Digital download/streaming – Hugel remix

1. "Bad Dreams – Hugel Remix" – 3:02

== Credits and personnel ==
- Julian Bunetta – guitar, synthesizer, drums, background vocals, songwriter, producer, recording engineer, mixing engineer
- Matt Zara – guitar, synthesizer, drums, bass, piano, songwriter, producer, recording engineer
- Jaten Dimsdale – vocals, background vocals, songwriter
- John Ryan – songwriter, producer
- John Sudduth – songwriter
- Rocky Block – songwriter
- Sarah Solovay – songwriter
- Jeff Gunnell – recording engineer, mixing engineer
- Nathan Dantzler – mastering engineer

== Charts ==
=== Weekly charts ===
Weekly chart performance for "Bad Dreams"
| Chart (2024–2025) | Peak position |
|---|---|
| Australia (ARIA) | 23 |
| Austria (Ö3 Austria Top 40) | 27 |
| Belarus Airplay (TopHit) | 12 |
| Belgium (Ultratop 50 Flanders) | 2 |
| Belgium (Ultratop 50 Wallonia) | 5 |
| Brazil Pop International Airplay (Crowley) | 9 |
| Bulgaria Airplay (PROPHON) | 1 |
| Canada Hot 100 (Billboard) | 24 |
| Canada AC (Billboard) | 10 |
| Canada CHR/Top 40 (Billboard) | 17 |
| Canada Hot AC (Billboard) | 15 |
| Canada Modern Rock (Billboard) | 29 |
| Colombia Anglo Airplay (National-Report) | 7 |
| CIS Airplay (TopHit) | 3 |
| Croatia International Airplay (Top lista) | 1 |
| Czech Republic Airplay (ČNS IFPI) | 5 |
| Czech Republic Singles Digital (ČNS IFPI) | 77 |
| Denmark (Tracklisten) | 22 |
| Estonia Airplay (TopHit) | 2 |
| Finland Airplay (Radiosoittolista) | 22 |
| France (SNEP) | 28 |
| Germany (GfK) | 13 |
| Global 200 (Billboard) | 26 |
| Greece International (IFPI) | 11 |
| Greece Airplay (IFPI) | 1 |
| Hungary (Editors' Choice Top 40) | 2 |
| Iceland (Tónlistinn) | 13 |
| Ireland (IRMA) | 8 |
| Israel International Airplay (Media Forest) | 2 |
| Japan Hot Overseas (Billboard Japan) | 5 |
| Kazakhstan Airplay (TopHit) | 4 |
| Latvia Airplay (LaIPA) | 1 |
| Latvia Airplay (TopHit) Hugel Remix | 6 |
| Lithuania (AGATA) | 7 |
| Lithuania Airplay (TopHit) | 1 |
| Luxembourg (Billboard) | 12 |
| Malta Airplay (Radiomonitor) | 6 |
| Moldova Airplay (TopHit) | 72 |
| Netherlands (Dutch Top 40) | 2 |
| Netherlands (Single Top 100) | 4 |
| New Zealand (Recorded Music NZ) | 16 |
| Nigeria (TurnTable Top 100) | 84 |
| North Macedonia Airplay (Radiomonitor) | 1 |
| Norway (VG-lista) | 11 |
| Poland Airplay (OLiS) | 1 |
| Poland Streaming (OLiS) | 10 |
| Portugal (AFP) | 43 |
| Romania (Billboard) | 13 |
| Romania Airplay (UPFR) | 8 |
| Romania Airplay (Media Forest) | 8 |
| Romania TV Airplay (Media Forest) | 12 |
| Russia Airplay (TopHit) | 12 |
| Serbia Airplay (Radiomonitor) | 1 |
| Slovakia Airplay (ČNS IFPI) | 5 |
| Slovakia Singles Digital (ČNS IFPI) | 19 |
| Slovenia Airplay (Radiomonitor) | 2 |
| South Korea BGM (Circle) | 74 |
| Suriname (Nationale Top 40) | 14 |
| Sweden (Sverigetopplistan) | 8 |
| Switzerland (Schweizer Hitparade) | 14 |
| Turkey International Airplay (Radiomonitor Türkiye) | 2 |
| Ukraine Airplay (TopHit) | 2 |
| UK Singles (Official Charts) | 6 |
| US Billboard Hot 100 | 30 |
| US Adult Alternative Airplay (Billboard) | 2 |
| US Adult Contemporary (Billboard) | 13 |
| US Adult Pop Airplay (Billboard) | 6 |
| US Pop Airplay (Billboard) | 8 |
| US Rock & Alternative Airplay (Billboard) | 27 |

=== Monthly charts ===
Monthly chart performance for "Bad Dreams"
| Chart (2024–2025) | Peak position |
|---|---|
| Belarus Airplay (TopHit) | 11 |
| CIS Airplay (TopHit) | 3 |
| Czech Republic (Rádio Top 100) | 10 |
| Estonia Airplay (TopHit) | 7 |
| Kazakhstan Airplay (TopHit) | 6 |
| Latvia Airplay (TopHit) Hugel Remix | 32 |
| Lithuania Airplay (TopHit) | 1 |
| Romania Airplay (TopHit) | 9 |
| Russia Airplay (TopHit) | 12 |
| Slovakia (Rádio Top 100) | 16 |
| Slovakia (Singles Digitál Top 100) | 46 |
| Ukraine Airplay (TopHit) | 2 |

=== Year-end charts ===
2024 year-end chart performance for "Bad Dreams"
| Chart (2024) | Position |
|---|---|
| Belgium (Ultratop 50 Flanders) | 79 |
| CIS Airplay (TopHit) | 76 |
| Estonia Airplay (TopHit) | 123 |
| Iceland (Tónlistinn) | 91 |
| Lithuania Airplay (TopHit) | 61 |
| Netherlands (Dutch Top 40) | 31 |
| Poland (Polish Airplay Top 100) | 43 |
| Romania Airplay (TopHit) | 84 |
| Russia Airplay (TopHit) | 169 |

2025 year-end chart performance for "Bad Dreams"
| Chart (2025) | Position |
|---|---|
| Australia (ARIA) | 26 |
| Austria (Ö3 Austria Top 40) | 57 |
| Belarus Airplay (TopHit) | 23 |
| Belgium (Ultratop 50 Flanders) | 9 |
| Belgium (Ultratop 50 Wallonia) | 19 |
| Bulgaria Airplay (PROPHON) | 3 |
| Canada (Canadian Hot 100) | 34 |
| Canada AC (Billboard) | 27 |
| Canada CHR/Top 40 (Billboard) | 37 |
| Canada Hot AC (Billboard) | 30 |
| Canada Modern Rock (Billboard) | 80 |
| CIS Airplay (TopHit) | 6 |
| Estonia Airplay (TopHit) | 43 |
| France (SNEP) | 52 |
| Germany (GfK) | 19 |
| Global 200 (Billboard) | 27 |
| Iceland (Tónlistinn) | 82 |
| Kazakhstan Airplay (TopHit) | 55 |
| Latvia Airplay (TopHit) Hugel Remix | 123 |
| Lithuania Airplay (TopHit) | 5 |
| Netherlands (Dutch Top 40) | 35 |
| Netherlands (Single Top 100) | 19 |
| New Zealand (Recorded Music NZ) | 19 |
| Poland (Polish Airplay Top 100) | 67 |
| Poland (Polish Streaming Top 100) | 20 |
| Romania Airplay (TopHit) | 13 |
| Russia Airplay (TopHit) | 52 |
| Sweden (Sverigetopplistan) | 13 |
| Switzerland (Schweizer Hitparade) | 15 |
| Ukraine Airplay (FDR) | 13 |
| UK Singles (OCC) | 20 |
| US Billboard Hot 100 | 74 |
| US Adult Contemporary (Billboard) | 21 |
| US Adult Pop Airplay (Billboard) | 13 |
| US Pop Airplay (Billboard) | 30 |

== Certifications ==
Certifications for "Bad Dreams"
| Region | Certification | Certified units/sales |
|---|---|---|
| Australia (ARIA) | 3× Platinum | 210,000^{‡} |
| Austria (IFPI Austria) | Platinum | 30,000^{‡} |
| Canada (Music Canada) | 4× Platinum | 320,000^{‡} |
| Denmark (IFPI Danmark) | Platinum | 90,000^{‡} |
| France (SNEP) | Diamond | 333,333^{‡} |
| Germany (BVMI) | Gold | 300,000^{‡} |
| Italy (FIMI) | Gold | 100,000^{‡} |
| Netherlands (NVPI) | Platinum | 93,000^{‡} |
| New Zealand (RMNZ) | 3× Platinum | 90,000^{‡} |
| Poland (ZPAV) | 3× Platinum | 375,000^{‡} |
| Portugal (AFP) | 2× Platinum | 20,000^{‡} |
| Spain (Promusicae) | Platinum | 100,000^{‡} |
| Switzerland (IFPI Switzerland) | Platinum | 30,000^{‡} |
| United Kingdom (BPI) | 2× Platinum | 1,200,000^{‡} |
| United States (RIAA) | 3× Platinum | 3,000,000^{‡} |
Streaming
| Greece (IFPI Greece) | 2× Platinum | 4,000,000^{†} |
^{‡} Sales+streaming figures based on certification alone.^{†} Streaming-only figures based on certification alone.

== Release history ==
Release dates and formats for "Bad Dreams"
| Region | Date | Format(s) | Version | Label | Ref. |
|---|---|---|---|---|---|
| Various | September 13, 2024 | Digital download; streaming | Original | Warner | |
| Various | November 8, 2024 | Digital download; streaming | Acoustic | Warner | |
| United States | December 10, 2024 | Contemporary hit radio | Original | Warner | |
| Various | April 11, 2025 | Digital download; streaming | Hugel remix | Warner | |
