= Tough Love (Teddy Swims EP) =

2022 EP by Teddy Swims

EP by Teddy Swims
- Released: January 21, 2022
- Recorded: 2021
- Length: 18:06
- Label: Warner

Teddy Swims chronology
A Very Teddy Christmas (2021)	Tough Love (2022)	Sleep Is Exhausting (2022)

Singles from Tough Love
- 1. "Simple Things" Released: August 27, 2021; 2. "Please Turn Green" Released: November 11, 2021; 3. "911" Released: January 7, 2022; 4. "Love for a Minute" Released: January 21, 2022

Tough Love is the third EP (second of original material) by American singer and songwriter Teddy Swims. The EP was released on January 21, 2022, by Warner Records.

== Reception ==
Professional ratings
Review scores
Source	Rating
AllMusic	4/5 stars

Matt Collar from AllMusic said "Blessed with a warmly textured and highly resonant voice, Teddy Swims is a chameleonic performer ably tackling a Luther Vandross-esque ballad one minute and an exuberant, Ryan Tedder-style pop anthem the next. Tough Love brings both sides of his musical personality together while also making room for flourishes of contemporary country and undercurrents of ebullient gospel."

== Track listing ==
Tough Love track listing
No.	Title	Writer(s)	Length
1.	"911"	Jaten Dimsdale; Jeff Gitelman; Alexander Izquierdo; Marcus Lomax	2:46
2.	"Please Turn Green"	Dimsdale; Evan Cline; Christian Griswold; Michael Whitworth; Dallas Wilson	2:58
3.	"For the Rest of Your Life"	Dimsdale; Rocky Block; Griswold; Michael Robinson	3:18
4.	"Amazing"	Dimsdale; Julian Bunetta; Adonijah Cartwright; Dallas Davidson	2:54
5.	"Love for a Minute"	Dimsdale; Anton Göransson; Isabella Sjöstrand	3:11
6.	"Simple Things"	Dimsdale; Bunetta; Ian Franzino; Andrew Haas; Shungudzo Kuyimba; Sherwyn Nicholls	2:59

== Charts ==
Weekly chart performance for Tough Love
Chart (2022–2024)	Peak position
UK Album Downloads (OCC)	20
US Billboard 200	200
