= Some Things I'll Never Know =

2023 single by Teddy Swims

Single by Teddy Swims featuring Maren Morris

from the album I've Tried Everything but Therapy (Part 1)
- Released: November 17, 2023
- Length: 4:02
- Label: Warner
- Songwriters: Jaten Dimsdale; Julian Bunetta; Joshua Coleman; Jaten Dimsdale; Kendrick Nicholls; Sherwyn Nicholls; Eli Teplin
- Producers: Julian Bunetta; Eli Teplin

Teddy Swims singles chronology
"Lose Control" (2023)	"Some Things I'll Never Know" (2023)	"The Door" (2024)

Maren Morris singles chronology
"Texas" (2023)	"Some Things I'll Never Know" (2023)	"42" (2023)

Lyric video
- "Some Things I'll Never Know" on YouTube

"Some Things I'll Never Know" is a song by American singer-songwriter Teddy Swims from his debut studio album, I've Tried Everything but Therapy (Part 1). A version featuring Maren Morris was released as a single on November 17, 2023. The song was certified platinum in Canada and gold in New Zealand.

== Background ==
Upon release, Swims said: "'Some Things I'll Never Know' is a very special song to me from my debut album, It’s one that has brought me so much healing and acceptance by writing it and now sharing it with the world. It's an honor to have Maren Morris join me on this track, she truly connected with the song and has brought such a new life to it."

== Promotion and release ==
"Some Things I'll Never Know" was teased in August 2023, a month before the album's release. In September, Swims said it's "the best song I've ever been a part of". On November 17, a version featuring Maren Morris was released.

== Charts ==
Weekly chart performance
Chart (2023)	Peak position
New Zealand Hot Singles (RMNZ)	8
UK Singles Downloads (OCC)	99

== Certifications ==
Certifications and sales
Region	Certification	Certified units/sales
Canada (Music Canada)	Platinum	80,000^{‡}
New Zealand (RMNZ)	Gold	15,000^{‡}
United Kingdom (BPI)	Silver	200,000^{‡}
^{‡} Sales+streaming figures based on certification alone.
