= Hammer to the Heart (Teddy Swims song) =

2024 promotional single by Teddy Swims

Promotional single by Teddy Swims

from the album I've Tried Everything but Therapy (Part 1.5)
- Released: April 26, 2024
- Length: 3:12
- Label: Warner
- Songwriters: Jaten Dimsdale; John Sudduth; Jordan Lehning; Julian Bunetta; Matt Zara; Rocky Block
- Producers: Bunetta; Zara

Lyric video
- "Hammer to the Heart" on YouTube

"Hammer to the Heart" is a song by American singer-songwriter Teddy Swims. It was written by Swims alongside John Sudduth, Jordan Lehning, Julian Bunetta, Matt Zara, and Rocky Block, and was released on April 26, 2024 as part of the deluxe album I've Tried Everything but Therapy (Part 1.5) as a promotional single, through Warner.

== Critical reception ==
In Financial Times, Ludovic Hunter-Tilney described the song as bringing a "baroque spaghetti western dimension to another tale of relationship woes". Writing for Washington Square News, Rory Lustberg noted that Swims’ vocal performance utilized both a "strong belt" and "rumbling low notes". While he praised the addition of soulful backing vocals, he described the song's lyrical content as "dry". Michael Cragg from The Guardian identified the song as "bludgeoning" and is "manufactured for streaming and radio ubiquity".

== Credits and personnel ==
Credits are adapted via Tidal.

=== Musicians ===
- Jaten Dimsdale – lead vocals
- Matt Zara – background vocals, bass, drums, guitar, keyboards, percussion, synthesizer
- Julian Bunetta – background vocals, drums, guitar, percussion
- Mikky Ekko – background vocals
- Rocky Block – background vocals
- Shaan Ramaprasad – strings

=== Technical ===
- Nathan Dantzler – mastering
- Serban Ghenea – mixing
- Julian Bunetta – programming, recording engineering
- Matt Zara – programming, recording engineering
- Jeff Gunnell – recording engineering
- Bryce Bordone – engineering
- Harrison Tate – mastering assistance

== Charts ==
Chart performance for "Hammer to the Heart"
| Chart (2024) | Peak position |
|---|---|
| Estonia Airplay (TopHit) | 97 |
| Lithuania Airplay (TopHit) | 107 |
| New Zealand Hot Singles (RMNZ) | 9 |
| Sweden Heatseeker (Sverigetopplistan) | 13 |
| UK Singles Downloads (OCC) | 29 |
| UK Singles Sales (OCC) | 32 |

== Certifications ==
Certifications for "Hammer to the Heart"
| Region | Certification | Certified units/sales |
|---|---|---|
| Canada (Music Canada) | Gold | 40,000^{‡} |
| New Zealand (RMNZ) | Gold | 15,000^{‡} |
| United Kingdom (BPI) | Silver | 200,000^{‡} |
^{‡} Sales+streaming figures based on certification alone.

== Release history ==
Release dates and formats for "Hammer to the Heart"
| Region | Date | Format(s) | Version | Label | Ref. |
|---|---|---|---|---|---|
| Various | April 26, 2024 | Digital download; streaming | Original | Warner | |
