= Hammer to the Heart =

Hammer to the Heart may refer to:

- Hammer to the Heart (The Tamperer featuring Maya song), 2000
- Hammer to the Heart (Teddy Swims song), 2024
