= All That Really Matters (song) =

2022 song by Illenium and Teddy Swims

Single by Illenium and Teddy Swims

from the album Illenium
- Released: July 29, 2022
- Length: 4:04
- Label: Illenium, Warner Music
- Songwriters: Nicholas Miller; Jaten Dimsdale; Stuart Crichton; Aidan Martin; Neil Ormandy; Wrabel
- Producers: Illenium; Stuart Crichton

Illenium singles chronology
"Don't Let Me Let Go" (2022)	"All That Really Matters" (2022)	"From the Ashes" (2022)

Teddy Swims singles chronology
"Better" (2022)	"All That Really Matters" (2022)	"Don't Stop Believin'" (2022)

Music video
- "All That Really Matters" on YouTube

"All That Really Matters" is a song by American DJ and producer Illenium and American singer-songwriter Teddy Swims. It was released on July 29, 2022, as the second single from Illenium's fifth studio album Illenium.

Upon release, Illenium said "With all that's going on in the world, it's great to just take a step back and find what really matters. Teddy's voice and performance take it to the next level." Swims said "This song is just a great reminder of what truly matters. With the world the way it is currently, it's easy to get caught up in all the distractions. The only thing that really matters is love. I've always been a fan of Illenium, so it’s an honor to do a song with him."

== Reception ==
Jason Heffler from EDM.com said "With its melancholic keys, resonant drum hits and pitched vocal chops, 'All That Really Matters' has all the hallmarks of a signature Illenium anthem. And a stentorian Teddy Swims delivers a typically stunning vocal performance, retrospectively offering sage advice to a younger version of himself."

Brian Bonavoglia from DJ Life Mag said "Adding to his arsenal with another vocal-driven, emotionally charged melodic bass beauty, 'All That Really Matters' is primed to be an immediate fan favorite."

== Track listings ==
Streaming/digital download

1. "All That Really Matters" – 4:04

Streaming/digital download – stripped

1. "All That Really Matters" (stripped) – 3:18
2. "All That Really Matters" – 4:04

Streaming/digital download – remixes

1. "All That Really Matters" (Mike Williams remix) – 3:21
2. "All That Really Matters" (Will Clarke remix) – 3:49
3. "All That Really Matters" (Crystal Skies remix) – 4:32
4. "All That Really Matters" – 4:04
5. "All That Really Matters" (stripped) – 3:18

Streaming/digital download

1. "All That Really Matters" (Ilan Bluestone and Maor Levi remix) – 4:01
2. "All That Really Matters" (Ilan Bluestone and Maor Levi extended remix) – 6:32

== Charts ==
Weekly chart performance for "All That Really Matters"
Chart (2022–2024)	Peak position
UK Singles Downloads (OCC)	33
US Hot Dance/Electronic Songs (Billboard)	23

== Certifications ==
Certifications for "All That Really Matters"
Region	Certification	Certified units/sales
New Zealand (RMNZ)	Platinum	30,000^{‡}
United Kingdom (BPI)	Silver	200,000^{‡}
United States (RIAA)	Platinum	1,000,000^{‡}
^{‡} Sales+streaming figures based on certification alone.

== Music Video ==
To unveil All That Really Matters to the public, Warner Music hired Lamar Bros and Movie Mogul Productions to produce a music video starring Teddy Swims and Illenium.

Stylistically, the music video plays heavily into the visualization from Dune (2021). The video creates a world of epic vistas over the dunes that makes it feel like you are transported to a different place. The central love story of the piece suggests nothing is perfect, but in the end, there is hope that what lies over the next dune will be worth the journey.

Building on the visualization from Dune, the decision was made to film a portion of the video in the Great Sand Dunes National Park of Colorado. On June 22, 2022, the two-day shoot began with in-studio green screen work with Teddy Swims and Illenium in Denver before moving to the Great Sand Dunes National Park for the desert shots. Movie Mogul Productions handled the local production management and on-site producing.
