= Sleep Is Exhausting =

2022 EP by Teddy Swims

EP by Teddy Swims
- Released: November 4, 2022
- Length: 17:21
- Label: Warner

Teddy Swims chronology
Tough Love (2022)	Sleep Is Exhausting (2022)	I've Tried Everything but Therapy (Part 1) (2023)

Singles from Sleep Is Exhausting
- 1. "Dose" Released: April 15, 2022; 2. "2 Moods" Released: June 10, 2022; 3. "Someone Who Loved You" Released: September 30, 2022; 4. "Devil in a Dress" Released: October 21, 2022

Sleep Is Exhausting is the fourth EP (third of original material) by American singer and songwriter Teddy Swims. The EP was released on November 4, 2022, by Warner Records.

Swims said "The title Sleep Is Exhausting comes from my inability to shut my mind off and sleep some nights. Even if I get sleep, there's nightmares."

== Track listing ==
Sleep is Exhausting track listing
No.	Title	Writer(s)	Length
1.	"Devil in a Dress"	Jaten Dimsdale; Stuart Crichton; Stephen Wrabel	2:55
2.	"2 Moods"	Dimsdale; Jeff Gitelman; Marcus Lomax; Whitney Phillips	2:24
3.	"Dose"	Dimsdale; Bunetta; Jesse Hampton; Waldemar Izquierdo; Kendrick Nicholls; John Ryan	3:00
4.	"Someone Who Loved You"	Dimsdale; James Abrahart; Jason Evigan; Jonny Price; Gian Stone	2:57
5.	"The Plan"	Dimsdale; Bunetta; Hampton; Izquierdo; Steph Jones; Nicholls	2:47
6.	"Hold Me"	Dimsdale; Jez Ashurst; Negin Djafari	3:18

== Charts ==
Weekly chart performance for Sleep is Exhausting
Chart (2022–2024)	Peak position
UK Album Downloads (OCC)	31
US Heatseekers Albums (Billboard)	14
