= Better (MK and Burns song) =

2022 song by MK, Burns and Teddy Swims

Single by MK, Burns featuring Teddy Swims

from the album In the Night Again
- Released: July 15, 2022
- Length: 3:02
- Label: Area10, Big On Blue, Sony Music, Ultra Music
- Songwriters: MK; Matthew Burns; Jaten Dimsdale; Stuart Crichton; Tommy Lee James
- Producers: MK; Burns; Stuart Crichton

MK singles chronology
"Teardrops" (2022)	"Better" (2022)	"Kiss It Better" (2022)

Teddy Swims singles chronology
"Bad for Me" (2022)	"Better" (2022)	"All That Really Matters" (2022)

Music video
- "Better" on YouTube

"Better" is a song by American DJ MK, British DJ Burns featuring American singer-songwriter Teddy Swims. It was released on July 15, 2022.

== Reception ==
Michael Major from Broadway World said "Uniting soulful sounds with signature stabs of euphoric piano chords, MK and Burns bring their classic melodic sensibilities to the track, amplified by a kicking bassline. Teddy Swims lends his viral vocal chops to the tune to create an energy that celebrates the house and soul roots of MK's native Detroit, with lyrics that spread a hopeful message of a brighter future ahead."

Brian Bonavoglia from DJ Life Mag called it a "feel-good dance anthem" saying, "'Better' comes equipped with bouncy piano keys, silky smooth vocals and a pulsating house beat making for an undeniable club-ready weapon with pop sensibilities."

== Track listing ==
Streaming/digital download

1. "Better" – 3:02

Streaming/digital download

1. "Better" (extended) – 5:18
2. "Better" – 3:02
3. "Better" (acoustic) – 2:30
4. "Better" (Mollie Collins remix) – 2:58
5. "Better" (Coco & Breezy remix) – 3:27

Streaming/digital download

1. "Better" (Julian Collazos remix) – 6:05

== Charts ==
Weekly chart performance for "Better"
Chart (2022)	Peak position
New Zealand Hot Singles (RMNZ)	23
UK Singles (Official Charts)	89
US Dance/Mix Show Airplay (Billboard)	6
