= Are You Even Real =

Single by Teddy Swims featuring Giveon

from the album I've Tried Everything but Therapy (Part 2)
- Released: January 10, 2025
- Genre: Pop; R&B; soul-pop
- Length: 2:27
- Label: Warner
- Songwriters: Abby Keen; Giveon Dezmann Evans; Jaten Dimsdale; Julian Bunetta; Lawson; Peter Thomas; Sarah "Solly" Solovay; Sean Kennedy; TaeJaun Ellis
- Producers: Julian Bunetta; Peter Thomas

Teddy Swims singles chronology
| "Georgia Ways" (2024) | "Are You Even Real" (2025) | "Guilty" (2025) |

Giveon singles chronology
| "The First Noel" (2023) | "Are You Even Real" (2025) | "Twenties" (2025) |

Music video
- "Are You Even Real" on YouTube

"Are You Even Real" is a song by the American singer and songwriter Teddy Swims and the American R&B singer Giveon. The song was released on January 10, 2025, as the second single from his second studio album I've Tried Everything but Therapy (Part 2) (2025).

== Background and composition ==
"Are You Even Real" was written by Swims and Giveon, together with Abby Keen, Lawson, Sarah "Solly" Solovay, Sean Kennedy, TaeJaun Ellis, Julian Bunetta, and Peter Thomas, with the latter two also producing the song. The song is described as "about being so taken aback by the intensity of the love they feel that they question whether it’s genuine or merely a product of their imagination".

About the making of the song, Swims said, "I'm in love with a perfect woman and I am so lucky that sometimes it feels too good to be true!" Talking about his collaboration with Giveon, he said, "I’m so grateful to have my dear friend Givēon on 'Are You Even Real' with me! He is a once in a generation talent, I’m trying to get this man to do a whole record with me!" Giveon added that the "song came together in such a natural way".

== Music video ==
The music video for "Are You Even Real" was directed by Cameron Dean. The video employed a laid-back approach, with Swims and Giveon mostly singing their verses from a seat that backs the other person.

== Reception ==
Alex Thomas from Neon Music praised the song for its vulnerability. He described "Are You Even Real" as a song that "builds its emotional core through carefully crafted vocal performances." He further added that Swims' vocal delivery "shifts between whisper-soft confessions and more powerful moments of realization, each word carefully shaped to maximize emotional impact." He also described the song's lyrics as traversing "a dreamscape where love feels both tangible and imaginary." Finally, he praised the minimalist production of the track, saying that it "underscores the vocals, with gentle instrumentation that enhances the song’s ethereal quality."

Writing for Billboard magazine, Mitchell Peters described "Are You Even Real" as a song which "blends Swims' heartfelt vocals with Giveon's signature deep tones, creating a rich contrast accentuated by tight harmonies in the track's latter half." Nmesoma Okechukwu from the online magazine Euphoria. praises the song's lyrics, saying that they heard something truly magical. Moreover, they said: "I bet you that if you've listened to it, you're going to find something to love about the song from the get-go."

== Credits and personnel ==
- Jaten Dimsdale – songwriter, vocals
- Giveon Dezmann Evans – songwriter, vocals
- Peter Thomas – drums, guitar, bass, synthesizer, piano, songwriter, producer, recording engineer
- Julian Bunetta – drums, songwriter, producer, recording engineer
- TaeJaun Ellis – background vocals, songwriter
- Abby Keen – songwriter
- Lawson – songwriter
- Sarah "Solly" Solovay – songwriter
- Sean Kennedy – songwriter
- Alex Ghenea – mixing engineer
- Brian Cruz – recording engineer
- Jeff Gunnell – recording engineer
- Nathan Dantzler – mastering engineer
- Harrison Tate – assistant mastering engineer
- Terena Dawn – assistant recording engineer

== Charts ==
=== Weekly charts ===
Weekly chart performance for "Are You Even Real"
| Chart (2025) | Peak position |
|---|---|
| Canada Hot 100 (Billboard) | 65 |
| Croatia International Airplay (Top lista) | 61 |
| Global 200 (Billboard) | 91 |
| Lebanon English Airplay (Lebanese Top 20) | 13 |
| Netherlands (Single Top 100) | 89 |
| New Zealand Hot Singles (RMNZ) | 2 |
| Nigeria (TurnTable Top 100) | 53 |
| Suriname (Nationale Top 40) | 1 |
| UK Hip Hop/R&B (OCC) | 23 |
| UK Singles Downloads (OCC) | 18 |
| UK Singles Sales (OCC) | 23 |
| US Billboard Hot 100 | 59 |
| US Hot R&B/Hip-Hop Songs (Billboard) | 10 |
| US Rhythmic Airplay (Billboard) | 5 |

=== Year-end charts ===
Year-end chart performance for "Are You Even Real"
| Chart (2025) | Position |
|---|---|
| US Hot R&B/Hip-Hop Songs (Billboard) | 37 |
| US R&B/Hip-Hop Airplay (Billboard) | 18 |
| US Rhythmic Airplay (Billboard) | 33 |

== Certifications ==
Certifications for "Are You Even Real"
| Region | Certification | Certified units/sales |
|---|---|---|
| Australia (ARIA) | Gold | 35,000^{‡} |
| Canada (Music Canada) | Gold | 40,000^{‡} |
| New Zealand (RMNZ) | Gold | 15,000^{‡} |
^{‡} Sales+streaming figures based on certification alone.

== Release history ==
Release dates and formats for "Are You Even Real"
| Region | Date | Format(s) | Version | Label | Ref. |
|---|---|---|---|---|---|
| Various | January 10, 2025 | Digital download; streaming | Original | Warner | |
