= Guilty (Teddy Swims song) =

2025 single by Teddy Swims

Single by Teddy Swims

from the album I've Tried Everything but Therapy (Part 2)
- Released: January 24, 2025
- Genre: Country pop
- Length: 2:56
- Label: Warner
- Songwriters: Jaten Dimsdale; Julian Bunetta; Jeff Gitelman; Marcus Lomax; John Ryan
- Producers: Bunetta; Gitelman; Ryan

Teddy Swims singles chronology
"Are You Even Real" (2025)	"Guilty" (2025)	"God Went Crazy" (2025)

Music video
- "Guilty" on YouTube

"Guilty" is a song by American singer-songwriter Teddy Swims. It was released on January 24, 2025 as the third single from his second studio album I've Tried Everything but Therapy (Part 2), which was released on the same day. A video for the song was directed by Bedroom.

== Composition ==
Described as a "throwback to spit-shined '00s pop-country", the song is about Teddy Swims feeling an unwavering love for a partner and needing them on a constant basis.

== Live performances ==
Teddy Swims performed the song on Today and The Howard Stern Show in January 2025.

== Charts ==
=== Weekly charts ===
Weekly chart performance for "Guilty"
Chart (2025)	Peak position
Australia (ARIA)	100
Belgium (Ultratop 50 Flanders)	16
Belgium (Ultratop 50 Wallonia)	22
CIS Airplay (TopHit)	75
Chile Anglo Airplay (Monitor Latino)	7
Croatia International Airplay (Top lista)	8
Czech Republic Airplay (ČNS IFPI)	14
Estonia Airplay (TopHit)	62
Guatemala Anglo Airplay (Monitor Latino)	3
Iceland (Tónlistinn)	32
Kazakhstan Airplay (TopHit)	103
Lithuania Airplay (TopHit)	21
Malta Airplay (Radiomonitor)	12
Netherlands (Dutch Top 40)	16
Netherlands (Single Top 100)	70
New Zealand Hot Singles (RMNZ)	8
Nicaragua Airplay (Monitor Latino)	15
North Macedonia Airplay (Radiomonitor)	2
Poland (Polish Airplay Top 100)	36
Portugal Airplay (AFP)	20
Romania Airplay (TopHit)	52
Russia Airplay (TopHit)	92
San Marino Airplay (SMRTV Top 50)	16
Serbia Airplay (Radiomonitor)	8
Slovakia Airplay (ČNS IFPI)	38
UK Singles Downloads (OCC)	46
US Bubbling Under Hot 100 (Billboard)	4

=== Monthly charts ===
Monthly chart performance for "Guilty"
Chart (2025)	Peak position
CIS Airplay (TopHit)	82
Lithuania Airplay (TopHit)	25
Romania Airplay (TopHit)	72

=== Year-end charts ===
Year-end chart performance for "Guilty"
Chart (2025)	Position
Belgium (Ultratop 50 Flanders)	33
Belgium (Ultratop 50 Wallonia)	103
Lithuania Airplay (TopHit)	75
Netherlands (Dutch Top 40)	45
Romania Airplay (TopHit)	154
