= I've Tried Everything but Therapy (Part 2) =

2025 studio album by Teddy Swims

Studio album by Teddy Swims
- Released: January 24, 2025
- Recorded: 2024
- Length: 40:48
- Label: Warner
- Producers: Julian Bunetta; Matt Zara; Jeff Gitelman; John Ryan; Ammo; Jon Green; Peter Thomas; Muni Long; Ian Fitchuk; Daniel Tashian; Jonathan Hoskins; Hidde Ament; Jasper Harris; Stargate

Teddy Swims chronology
I've Tried Everything but Therapy (Part 1) (2023)	I've Tried Everything but Therapy (Part 2) (2025)	I've Tried Everything but Therapy (2025)

Singles from I've Tried Everything but Therapy (Part 2)
- 1. "Bad Dreams" Released: September 13, 2024; 2. "Are You Even Real" Released: January 10, 2025; 3. "Guilty" Released: January 24, 2025

I've Tried Everything but Therapy (Part 2) is the second half of the debut studio album by American singer and songwriter Teddy Swims. A follow up to his debut album I've Tried Everything but Therapy (Part 1), the album was released on January 24, 2025, by Warner Records, and features the singles "Bad Dreams", "Are You Even Real" and "Guilty", and also includes the Bose x NME: C24 Mixtape single, "Funeral".

An album reflecting the current state of his personal life, I've Tried Everything but Therapy (Part 2) blends together diverse genres, including R&B, pop, country, rock, and soul-pop, and features artists such as Giveon, Muni Long, Coco Jones, and GloRilla.

I've Tried Everything but Therapy (Part 2) peaked at number one in Australia and Croatia, and entered the top ten in Austria, Belgium, Germany, Hungary, Ireland, the Netherlands, New Zealand, Norway, Scotland, Sweden, Switzerland, the United Kingdom, and the United States. The album also received a silver certification from the British Phonographic Industry. It was nominated for Best Pop Vocal Album at the 68th Annual Grammy Awards.

== Background and promotion ==
In an interview with People magazine, Swims revealed how his personal life has influenced the creation of I've Tried Everything but Therapy (Part 2), specifically his single "Bad Dreams". He revealed that the song was inspired by his current girlfriend, Raiche Wright, and her ability to help him navigate during his restless nights. He also described the album as a more upbeat record in comparison to his debut album, reflecting the current state of his personal life. He added, "I feel like we're closing a chapter on a moment in my life that deserves to be closed." He also added that the album is meant to share to the listeners regarding the progress of his healing journey, and that "how on the other side of heartbreak, there’s a beautiful life waiting to happen".

To promote the album, Swims appeared on The Kelly Clarkson Show, talking about how the album will provide more healing and closure to what he was working through in his debut album. Likewise, he appeared on The Jennifer Hudson Show. He also made a guest appearance on The Tonight Show Starring Jimmy Fallon, performing the song "Bad Dreams".

== Critical reception ==
Professional ratings
Aggregate scores
Source	Rating
Metacritic	70/100
Review scores
Source	Rating
AllMusic	3.5/5 stars
Financial Times	3/5 stars
The Guardian	2/5 stars
NME	4/5 stars
The Observer	4/5
Rolling Stone	3.5/5 stars

I've Tried Everything but Therapy (Part 2) was met with generally positive reviews from music critics. At Metacritic, which assigns a normalized rating out of 100 to reviews from mainstream critics, the album received an average score of 70 based on six reviews, indicating "generally favorable reviews". Writing for the magazine Rolling Stone, Maura Johnston gave the album a favorable review, calling Swims a "pop scholar", and that "he shines most brightly when he’s in settings that suggest jukebox hits of yore". Jordan Bassett from New Musical Express and Damien Morris from The Observer both gave the album 4 stars out of 5. Bassett said that "the swiftly released follow-up staves off a bad case of sequelitis because it successfully deepens Swims’ story". Morris, on the other hand, wrote that the sequel album "feels more corporate", calling the tracks "genre-hopping" and "playlist-pleasing", and that the album is "much gusty whimpering about how great his girlfriend is."

Ludovic Hunter-Tilney from the British newspaper Financial Times gave it a 3 out of 5, writing that the album has a "calculating heart amid the songs’ romantic turbulence." Renowned for Sound's Ryan Bulbeck also gave the album a positive review, saying that the album "not only continues the sound of the previous release, but also the watertight songwriting and excellent performances". Tai Lawson from Shatter the Standards gave it a 3.5 out of 5 stars, citing that the album "feels more mature and cohesive", "demonstrates growth in both songwriting and production", and calling the arrangements "sophisticated, with instrumental layers that create rich textures without overshadowing Teddy’s powerful voice". Lawson also applauded Swims' vocal versatility, calling it "loaded with emotion and capable of moving seamlessly between subtle and powerful."

Writing for the magazine Variety, Jem Aswad stated that the album "succeeds, although its head-spinning array of genres — different takes on pop, R&B and country — try a little too hard to be everything for everybody." He also applauded Swims' vocal delivery, calling it "stellar" and "versatile", albeit noting that his attempts at multiple genres "do not always land" because of the album's oversized production. Michael Cragg from The Guardian gave the album a mixed review, saying that the album was not "designed to creep up on you". He pointed out Swims’ "occasional lyrical shortcomings" but praised the "airier, soft-rock sound" songs of the album.

=== Accolades ===
Awards and nominations
Year	Award	Category	Result	Ref.
2026	Grammy Awards	Best Pop Vocal Album	Nominated	
2026	Hungarian Music Awards	Foreign Modern Pop-Rock Album or Recording of the Year	Won	

== Track listing ==
I've Tried Everything but Therapy (Part 2) track listing
No.	Title	Writer(s)	Producer(s)	Length
1.	"Not Your Man"	Jaten Dimsdale; Feli Ferraro; John Sudduth; Joshua Coleman; Julian Bunetta; Rocky Block	Ammo; Bunetta; Zara	3:37
2.	"Funeral"	Dimsdale; Bunetta; Sudduth; Jon Green; Whitney Phillips	Bunetta; Green; Zara	3:54
3.	"Your Kind of Crazy"	Dimsdale; Bunetta; Sudduth; Jeff Gitelman; Marcus Lomax	Bunetta; Gitelman	3:02
4.	"Bad Dreams"	Dimsdale; Block; Bunetta; Sudduth; John Ryan; Matt Zara; Sarah Solovay	Bunetta; Ryan; Zara	3:04
5.	"Are You Even Real" (featuring Giveon)	Dimsdale; Bunetta; Solovay; Abby Keen; Giveon Dezmann Evans; Lawson; Peter Thomas; Sean Kennedy; TaeJaun Ellis	Bunetta; Thomas	2:27
6.	"Black & White" (featuring Muni Long)	Dimsdale; Gitelman; Sudduth; Charlie Coffeen; Priscilla Renea	Gitelman; Long	3:00
7.	"Northern Lights"	Dimsdale; Bunetta; Coleman; Ferraro; Andrew Haas; Ian Franzino; Steph Jones	Bunetta; Daniel Tashian; Ian Fitchuk	3:35
8.	"Guilty"	Dimsdale; Bunetta; Gitelman; Lomax; Ryan	Bunetta; Gitelman; Ryan	2:56
9.	"It Ain’t Easy"	Ryan; Amy Allen; Jonathan Hoskins	Bunetta; Hoskins; Ryan	4:05
10.	"If You Ever Change Your Mind"	Dimsdale; Bunetta; Franzino; Haas; Sudduth; Zara	Bunetta; Zara	2:01
11.	"She Got It" (featuring Coco Jones and GloRilla)	Dimsdale; Courtney Jones; Gloria Woods; Hidde Ament; Jasper Harris; Leven Kali; Mikkel Eriksen; Sara Diamond; Tor Hermansen	Ament; Bunetta; Harris; Stargate (co.)	3:11
12.	"Hammer to the Heart"	Dimsdale; Block; Bunetta; Sudduth; Zara	Bunetta; Zara	3:12
13.	"She Loves the Rain"	Dimsdale; Block; Bunetta; Gitelman; Ryan	Bunetta; Gitelman; Ryan	2:39
Total length:				40:48

== Credits and personnel ==
=== Musicians ===
- Jaten Dimsdale – lead vocals (all tracks), background vocals (1, 4, 7–9, 11, 13)
- Matt Zara – guitar (tracks 1–2, 4, 10, 12), drums (1–2, 4, 12), bass (1–2, 4, 10, 12), piano (1–2, 4, 10), programming (1–2, 10, 12), synthesizer (1, 4, 10, 12), organ (2, 10), percussion (1, 12), strings (10), keyboards (12), background vocals (12)
- Julian Bunetta – drums (tracks 1–5, 9, 11–12), programming (1–3, 10–12), synthesizer (3–4, 7), background vocals (2–4, 12), percussion (1, 3, 9, 11), guitar (3–4, 11–12), piano (3, 9, 11), bass (1, 11), synthesizer (9)
- Jeff Gitelman – programming (tracks 3, 6, 8), drums (3, 6, 8), bass (3, 6, 8), guitar (3, 8, 13), percussion (3, 8), background vocals (3), electric guitar (6), piano (8), synthesizer (8)
- John Ryan – programming (tracks 8–9, 13), background vocals (8–9, 13), guitar (8–9, 13), bass (8–9, 13), piano (8–9, 13), percussion (8–9, 13), synthesizer (8–9, 13), drums (9, 13)
- Joshua Coleman – programming (track 1), drums (1), background vocals (1), strings (1), percussion (1), bass (1), piano (1), synthesizer (1)
- Peter Thomas – drums (track 5), guitar (5), bass (5), piano (5), synthesizer (5)
- Ian Fitchuk – programming (track 7), drums (7), piano (7), percussion (7), acoustic guitar (7)
- Daniel Tashian – bass (track 7), acoustic guitar (7), synthesizer (7), slide guitar (7)
- Jon Green – programming (track 2), piano (2), drums (2), strings (2)
- Jonathan Hoskins – programming (track 9), percussion (9), drums (9)
- John Sudduth – background vocals (tracks 2–3, 12)
- Drew McKeon – drums (tracks 3, 6, 8)
- Bryan Page – drums (track 3), violin (6)
- Jasper Harris – keyboards (track 11), background vocals (11)
- Giveon Dezmann Evans – vocals (track 5)
- Priscilla Renea – vocals (track 6)
- Courtney Jones – vocals (track 11)
- Gloria Woods – vocals (track 11)
- Mikkel S. Eriksen – programming (track 11)
- Tor Erik Hermansen – programming (track 11)
- Denise Carite – background vocals (track 2)
- Marcus Lomax – background vocals (track 3)
- TaeJaun Ellis – background vocals (track 5)
- Brendan Civale – background vocals (track 8)
- Damon Bunetta – background vocals (track 8)
- Rocky Block – background vocals (track 12)
- Rixlii – strings (track 1)
- Dann Huff – guitar (track 2)
- Charlie Coffeen – piano (track 6)
- Sora M. Lopez – cello (track 6)
- Erik Elligers – tenor saxophone (track 6)
- Miles Julian – trumpet (track 6)
- Austin Hoke – cello (track 7)
- Betsy Lamb – viola (track 7)
- Annaliese Kowert – violin (track 7)
- Laura Epling – violin (track 7)
- Ian McGimpsey – pedal steel guitar (track 9)
- Shaan Ramaprasad – strings (track 12)

=== Technical ===
- Nathan Dantzler – mastering
- Serban Ghenea – mixing (tracks 1, 3, 6–8, 11–12)
- Jeff Gunnell – mixing (tracks 2, 4, 10), recording (1–5, 7–10, 12–13)
- Julian Bunetta – mixing (tracks 2, 4), recording (1–5, 9–10, 12)
- Matt Zara – recording (tracks 1–2, 4, 10, 12)
- Jeff Gitelman – recording (tracks 3, 6, 8)
- John Ryan – recording (tracks 8–9, 13)
- Alex Ghenea – mixing (tracks 5, 9, 13)
- Joshua Coleman – recording (track 1)
- Jon Green – recording (track 2)
- Peter Thomas – recording (track 5)
- Brian Cruz – recording (track 5)
- Kuk Harrell – recording (track 6)
- Xavier Daniel – recording (track 6)
- Konrad Snyder – recording (track 7)
- Jonathan Hoskins – recording (track 9)
- Stargate – recording (track 11)
- Aaron Bolton – recording (track 11)
- Philip Lynah Jr. – recording (track 11)
- Jordan Lehning – strings engineering (track 7)
- Harrison Tate – mastering assistance (tracks 1–3, 5–13)
- Terena Dawn – recording assistance (track 5)

== Charts ==
=== Weekly charts ===
Weekly chart performance for I've Tried Everything but Therapy (Part 2)
Chart (2025)	Peak position
Australian Albums (ARIA)	1
Austrian Albums (Ö3 Austria)	9
Belgian Albums (Ultratop Flanders)	7
Belgian Albums (Ultratop Wallonia)	5
Canadian Albums (Billboard)	11
Croatian International Albums (HDU)	1
Danish Albums (Hitlisten)	14
Dutch Albums (Album Top 100)	3
Finnish Albums (Suomen virallinen lista)	25
French Albums (SNEP)	24
German Albums (Offizielle Top 100)	7
Greek Albums (IFPI)	46
Hungarian Albums (MAHASZ)	2
Irish Albums (Official Charts)	4
Italian Albums (FIMI)	88
Lithuanian Albums (AGATA)	17
New Zealand Albums (RMNZ)	4
Norwegian Albums (VG-lista)	4
Polish Albums (ZPAV)	20
Portuguese Albums (AFP)	36
Scottish Albums (Official Charts)	3
Spanish Albums (Promusicae)	17
Swedish Albums (Sverigetopplistan)	9
Swiss Albums (Schweizer Hitparade)	6
UK Albums (Official Charts)	2
US Billboard 200	4

=== Year-end charts ===
Year-end chart performance for I've Tried Everything but Therapy (Part 2)
Chart (2025)	Position
Australian Albums (ARIA)	61
Belgian Albums (Ultratop Flanders)	145
Croatian International Albums (HDU)	17
Dutch Albums (Album Top 100)	19
French Albums (SNEP)	148
Swedish Albums (Sverigetopplistan)	50
UK Albums (OCC)	80
US Billboard 200	150

== Certifications ==
Certifications for I've Tried Everything But Therapy (Part 2)
Region	Certification	Certified units/sales
Canada (Music Canada)	Gold	40,000^{‡}
Denmark (IFPI Danmark)	Gold	10,000^{‡}
United Kingdom (BPI)	Gold	100,000^{‡}
United States (RIAA)	Gold	500,000^{‡}
^{‡} Sales+streaming figures based on certification alone.
