= Judy Stakee =

Executive music publisher, artist mentor, author

Judy Stakee is a veteran executive music publisher, artist mentor, author and speaker based in Los Angeles, California. She is known for signing and developing artists including Katy Perry, Sheryl Crow, Gavin DeGraw, Joy Williams, and John Shanks. She was the Senior Vice-President of Creative at Warner Chappell Music from 1989 to 2009. She is also the founder of The Judy Stakee Company, an artist development company based in Los Angeles.

== Career ==
=== 1979–1985 ===
Judy started her professional career at Arista Music Publishing Group, in 1979, as assistant to the president of the company, Billy Meshel. By 1985, she was the General Professional Manager at the company, managing and marketing the songwriters and their catalogs. She worked with artists such as Dolly Parton, Barry Manilow, and The Forester Sisters. In the year 1985, Judy pitched the song Don't Call It Love, by Dean Pitchford and Tom Snow, to Dolly Parton's producer. She represented Dean's portion of the song. The song went on to win BMI's Most Performed Country Song in 1986. At the same award show a single honored for one of the fifty most performed country songs of the year, Just in Case by the Forester Sisters, was one of the four songs that allowed songwriters Sonny LeMaire and J.P. Pennington to share the BMI Writer of the Year Award.

=== 1985–2009 ===
Judy joined Screen Gems Music Publishing in 1985 where she worked closely with prominent songwriters such as Carole King, Gerry Goffin, Barry Mann and Cynthia Weil. She also signed and developed the artists and songwriters like Scott Cutler, Jennifer Kimball and Rick Nowels.

In 1989, Judy started working at Warner Chappell Music as Senior Vice President of Creative where she spent 20 years, developing and managing artists and songwriters. Judy successfully developed singer-songwriters early in their careers including Sheryl Crow, Katy Perry, Jewel, Gavin DeGraw, Michelle Branch, Joy Williams, For King & Country, Kellie Coffey and Lucy Woodward. She was in charge of the majority of pop staff songwriters in Los Angeles and also developed writers in Nashville, New York, Florida and internationally. She worked with writers including Jamie Houston, Wayne Kirkpatrick, Shaun Shankel, Ben Glover, Dillon O'Brian, Kevin Kadish, John Shanks, Franne Golde, Kasia Livingston, Tim James, Robbie Nevil, Matthew Gerrard, Scott Cutler and Anne Preven.

=== 2009–present ===
Judy founded an artist development company, The Judy Stakee Company, in 2009, in Los Angeles, California.[13] She currently manages producer-writer Jordan Richman who produced and co-wrote Boomerang by JoJo Siwa in 2015. She is also the producer of an ongoing video series called Door to Door where she interviews successful songwriters. Notable interviews include Bonnie Tyler, John Shanks, and David Hodges.

Judy authored the book The Songwriter's Survival Guide which was nominated for INDIEFAB Book of the Year Award in 2015.
