= Julian Bunetta =

- Born: Julian Collin Bunetta; 1982 or 1983 (age 43–44)
- Occupations: Songwriter; record producer; mixing engineer; audio engineer
- Instruments: Bass; drums; guitar; keyboards; percussion; synthesizer
- Years active: 2005–present
- Labels: Sony Publishing; Syco; Warner Chappell
- Spouse: Virginia Davis

Julian Collin Bunetta (born 1982 or 1983) is an American songwriter, record producer, mixing engineer, and audio engineer. A multi-instrumentalist, he is known for his work with various artists including One Direction, Niall Horan, Thomas Rhett, Sabrina Carpenter, and Teddy Swims, frequently in collaboration with fellow songwriter John Ryan.

For his contributions to Carpenter's 2024 album Short n' Sweet, Bunetta was nominated for three awards at the 67th Annual Grammy Awards, including Album of the Year and Record of the Year (for "Espresso").

== Early life ==
Julian Collin Bunetta was raised in Calabasas, California. His father Peter Bunetta is a drummer and record producer, and his uncle Al Bunetta worked as John Prine's manager and co-founded Oh Boy Records; he has credited both as his early mentors. His brother, Damon, is also a musician, businessman, and his talent manager.

He had learned to play the drums by the time he was "three or four", and started producing music using Emagic's Logic after his father purchased the software for him at age thirteen. Bunetta started attending Berklee College of Music in 2001. The same year, his father Peter founded Family Affair Productions with him and Damon.

== Career ==
=== Early years (2001–2010) ===
When he was in his late teens, his father introduced him to music executive Judy Stakee. who signed him to a publishing deal with Warner Chappell Music. He moved back to Los Angeles with his parents and did not return to Berklee, travelling to and from Nashville into his early twenties to work with various country music songwriters. Bunetta received his first songwriting credit on the 2005 Little Big Town song "Live with Lonesome", which he wrote with Wayne Kirkpatrick during a songwriting boot camp in Nashville.

He met frequent collaborator and business partner John Ryan at a party while Ryan was attending Berklee. They began working together in 2010 when Ryan moved to Los Angeles to intern for Family Affair; Ryan was signed to Family Affair as a songwriter that same year. In 2017, Bunetta estimated that the pair "work together about 50 percent of the time". He was signed to Simon Cowell's Syco Music label and later hired as the music producer for the first and second seasons of the American version of The X Factor.

=== Breakthrough with One Direction (2011–2015) ===
"We did X Factor October, November, December. Took off January. February, flew to London. We'd gather ideas with [One Direction], come up with sounds, hang out. Then back to L.A. for March, produce some stuff, then go out on the road with them in April. Get vocals, write a song or two, come back for May, work on the vocals, and produce the songs we wrote on the road. Back to London in June-ish. Back here for July, produce it up. Go back on tour in August, get last bits of vocals, mix in September, back to X Factor in October, album out in November, January off, start it all over again."

— Bunetta on his time working with One Direction from 2013 to 2016

In 2011, Tyler Brown, then an A&R representative at Syco, contacted Bunetta, Ryan, and English songwriter Jamie Scott to write songs for One Direction's second album Take Me Home (2012). The trio wrote "C'mon C'mon" and "She's Not Afraid", and Bunetta also served as a producer on "I Would" and "They Don't Know About Us". Bunetta and Ryan produced the group's 2013 charity single "One Way or Another (Teenage Kicks)"; the track became his first to chart on the Billboard Hot 100, peaking at number 13. He again worked with the Ryan and Scott on the group's third album Midnight Memories (2013); the first three songs he co-wrote and produced were the singles "Best Song Ever", "Story of My Life", and the title track. He worked with Ryan as a writer and producer on six other tracks, including the fourth and final single "You & I". Bunetta has called "Story of My Life" his favorite of the One Direction songs he worked on, describing it as "one of those magic nuggets that fell out of the sky when we happened to have our phones on" and a "calling card" track that helped to progressed his career.

While working on their next album, Four (2014), Bunetta noted that "there were some tensions going on" between the members that resulted in lyricism with multiple meanings. He described the album's sound as "much more dynamic and subtle" than their previous works, specifically singling out "Night Changes" and "Fireproof" as songs that highlighted their vocal development.

In August 2015, One Direction member Niall Horan announced that the group would be "taking a well earned break" in early 2016. The following day, Bunetta said that Made in the A.M. was written and recorded "not knowing if they were going to take a break or not, because that wasn't decided just yesterday". Their hiatus began in March 2016.

=== Work with other artists (2016–present) ===
Bunetta continued to collaborate with One Direction members on their subsequent solo careers, particularly Horan. He worked on Horan's debut album Flicker (2017) as a writer and producer, writing the album's lead single "Slow Hands" with Horan, Ryan, Alexander Izquierdo, and Tobias Jesso Jr.; Horan credited Bunetta and Ryan for having "written the chorus" before he made additional contributions. Bunetta continued to work with him on various tracks from his next two albums, including "Nice to Meet Ya" on 2020's Heartbreak Weather and "You Could Start a Cult" on 2023's The Show. With Louis Tomlinson, Bunetta served as a producer on "Just Hold On" (a collaborative track between Tomlinson and Steve Aoki), and was a co-writer and producer for Tomlinson's singles "Miss You" and "We Made It". He also co-wrote Harry Styles' 2017 single "Two Ghosts".

After meeting Hey Violet at one of their concerts, Bunetta was "blown away by what [lead vocalist Rena Lovelis] was doing" and wanted to work with the group to "carve out a musical slice for them". He co-wrote and produced every song on their 2016 album From the Outside, including their single "Guys My Age". The song peaked at number 68 on the Billboard Hot 100, which Billboard writer Rob LeDonne described as "a coup by any means for a rock band today".

In the mid-2010s, he met Thomas Rhett through his then-fiancée and Rhett's talent manager Virginia Davis, which initially made Bunetta "nervous" to write with Rhett. In 2017, they decided to collaborate and Bunetta traveled to work with Rhett for two weeks. Bunetta and Dave Barnes co-wrote "Craving You", Rhett's duet with Maren Morris, while Rhett was ill. Bunetta was one of four producers on Rhett's album Life Changes (2017) and has continued writing and producing songs with Rhett, including "Look What God Gave Her" and "Beer Can't Fix" on Center Point Road (2019), "Angels (Don't Always Have Wings)" on Where We Started (2022), and every track on About a Woman (2024). In October 2018, Bunetta, Ryan, and Family Affair Productions partnered with Big Deal Music to create Big Family Music Publishing, with his brother Damon and Big Deal partner Casey Robinson serving as co-CEOs.

In 2021, he collaborated with Sabrina Carpenter as a writer and producer on "Nonsense", which was released as the fifth single from her 2022 album Emails I Can't Send. That same year, Bunetta produced Kelsea Ballerini's album Subject to Change alongside Shane McAnally. Having worked with multiple songwriters and producers on her previous album Kelsea (2020), Ballerini said that the writing and recording process was "more streamlined" due to the pair producing the entire album.

He began writing with Teddy Swims in January 2020, ultimately co-writing and producing Swims' 2023 breakthrough single "Lose Control", which Bunetta jokingly referred to as "[a] three-year overnight success". Bunetta and Swims reached out to Ammo and Mikky Ekko to collaborate, and they spent four days together working on the song in Palm Springs, California. Bunetta worked on Swims' debut album I've Tried Everything but Therapy (Part 1) (2023) and its follow up I've Tried Everything but Therapy (Part 2) (2025).

He co-wrote five songs on Waterparks' 2023 album Intellectual Property, including singles "Funeral Grey" and "Brainwashed". Bunetta again collaborated with Carpenter on her sixth album Short n' Sweet (2024), co-writing and producing the lead single "Espresso" and producing the third single "Taste". He received his first Grammy Award nominations for his work on the album; at the 67th Annual Grammy Awards, Bunetta was nominated for Record of the Year for "Espresso", Album of the Year, and Best Engineered Album, Non-Classical. In October 2024, Bunetta was signed to Sony Music Publishing. The next month, he topped the Billboard Hot 100 Producers chart.

== Personal life ==
Bunetta is married to talent manager Virginia Davis. Since 2018, they have lived together in Nashville.

== Awards and nominations ==
Awards and nominations received by Julian Bunetta
| Award | Year | Nominated work | Category | Result | Ref. |
|---|---|---|---|---|---|
| Grammy Awards | 2025 | "Espresso" | Record of the Year | Nominated | |
| Grammy Awards | 2025 | Short n' Sweet | Album of the Year | Nominated | |
| Grammy Awards | 2025 | Short n' Sweet | Best Engineered Album, Non-Classical | Nominated | |

== Production and songwriting discography ==
=== Singles ===
List of singles, with selected chart positions, showing year released and artist name
| Title | Year | Peak chart positions | | | | Album |
| Title | Year | US | AUS | CAN | UK | Album |
|---|---|---|---|---|---|---|
| "Touch" (Natasha Bedingfield) | 2010 | — | — | 60 | — | Strip Me |
| "Start Without You"^{[w]} (Alexandra Burke featuring Laza Morgan) | 2010 | — | — | — | 1 | Overcome (Deluxe) |
| "Co-Pilot"^{[w]} (Kristina Maria featuring Laza Morgan) | 2011 | — | — | 26 | — | Tell the World |
| "Breathing"^{[w]} (Jason Derulo) | 2011 | — (Note: "Breathing" did not enter the Billboard Hot 100, but peaked at number 12 on the Bubbling Under Hot 100.) | 9 | — | 25 | Future History |
| "Do You Feel What I Feel? (JLS) | 2011 | — | — | — | 16 | Jukebox |
| "One Way or Another (Teenage Kicks)" (One Direction) | 2013 | 13 | 3 | 9 | 1 | Non-album single |
| "Best Song Ever" (One Direction) | 2013 | 2 | 4 | 2 | 2 | Midnight Memories |
| "Story of My Life" (One Direction) | 2013 | 6 | 3 | 3 | 2 | Midnight Memories |
| "Midnight Memories" (One Direction) | 2014 | 12 | 45 | 35 | 39 | Midnight Memories |
| "You & I" (One Direction) | 2014 | 68 | 23 | 78 | 19 | Midnight Memories |
| "Steal My Girl" (One Direction) | 2014 | 13 | 9 | 14 | 3 | Four |
| "Night Changes" (One Direction) | 2014 | 31 | 33 | 20 | 7 | Four |
| "Five More Hours"^{[w]} (Deorro and Chris Brown) | 2015 | — (Note: "Five More Hours" did not enter the Billboard Hot 100, but peaked at number 11 on the Bubbling Under Hot 100.) | 7 | 57 | 4 | Good Evening |
| "Drag Me Down" (One Direction) | 2015 | 3 | 1 | 4 | 1 | Made in the A.M. |
| "History" (One Direction) | 2015 | 65 | 25 | 46 | 6 | Made in the A.M. |
| "Perfect" (One Direction) | 2015 | 10 | 4 | 13 | 2 | Made in the A.M. |
| "Forever Young" (Louisa Johnson) | 2015 | — | — | — | 9 | Non-album single |
| "Guys My Age" (Hey Violet) | 2016 | 68 | 78 | — | — | From the Outside |
| "Just Hold On"^{[p]} (Steve Aoki and Louis Tomlinson) | 2016 | 52 | 20 | 40 | 2 | Neon Future III |
| "When Christmas Comes Around"^{[p]} (Matt Terry) | 2016 | — | — | — | 3 | Non-album single |
| "Break My Heart" (Hey Violet) | 2017 | — | — | — | — | From the Outside |
| "Craving You" (Thomas Rhett featuring Maren Morris) | 2017 | 39 | — | 61 | — | Life Changes |
| "Slow Hands" (Niall Horan) | 2017 | 11 | 2 | 8 | 7 | Flicker |
| "Two Ghosts"^{[w]} (Harry Styles) | 2017 | — (Note: "Two Ghosts" did not enter the Billboard Hot 100, but peaked at number 18 on the Bubbling Under Hot 100.) | — | 91 | 58 | Harry Styles |
| "Miss You" (Louis Tomlinson) | 2017 | — (Note: "Miss You" did not enter the Billboard Hot 100, but peaked at number 6 on the Bubbling Under Hot 100.) | 66 | — | 39 | Non-album single |
| "These Days" (Rudimental featuring Jess Glynne, Macklemore, and Dan Caplen) | 2018 | — (Note: "These Days" did not enter the Billboard Hot 100, but peaked at number 5 on the Bubbling Under Hot 100.) | 2 | 31 | 1 | Toast to Our Differences |
| "On the Loose" (Niall Horan) | 2018 | — | — | — | 94 | Flicker |
| "Think About You" (Delta Goodrem) | 2018 | — | 19 | — | — | Non-album single |
| "Low Key"^{[w]} (Ally Brooke featuring Tyga) | 2019 | — (Note: "Low Key" did not enter the Billboard Hot 100, but peaked at number 18 on the Bubbling Under Hot 100.) | — | — | — | Non-album single |
| "Look What God Gave Her" (Thomas Rhett) | 2019 | 32 | — | 33 | — | Center Point Road |
| "Nice to Meet Ya" (Niall Horan) | 2019 | 63 | 60 | 55 | 22 | Heartbreak Weather |
| "We Made It" (Louis Tomlinson) | 2019 | — | — | — | — | Walls |
| "Beer Can't Fix" (Thomas Rhett featuring Jon Pardi) | 2020 | 36 | — | 45 | — | Center Point Road |
| "No Judgement" (Niall Horan) | 2020 | 97 | 88 | 100 | 32 | Heartbreak Weather |
| "Black and White" (Niall Horan) | 2020 | — | — | — | 91 | Heartbreak Weather |
| "Love on Display"^{[w]} (Guy Sebastian) | 2020 | — | 61 | — | — | T.R.U.T.H. |
| "Growing Up Is _____" (Ruel) | 2021 | — | 68 | — | — | 4th Wall |
| "Praise the Lord" (Breland featuring Thomas Rhett) | 2022 | 100 | — | — | — | Cross Country |
| "Heartfirst" (Kelsea Ballerini) | 2022 | — (Note: "Heartfirst" did not enter the Billboard Hot 100, but peaked at number 6 on the Bubbling Under Hot 100.) | — | — | — | Subject to Change |
| "Nonsense" (Sabrina Carpenter) | 2022 | 56 | 22 | 37 | 32 | Emails I Can't Send |
| "If You Go Down (I'm Goin' Down Too)" (Kelsea Ballerini) | 2022 | — (Note: "If You Go Down (I'm Goin' Down Too)" did not enter the Billboard Hot 100, but peaked at number 16 on the Bubbling Under Hot 100.) | — | 85 | — | Subject to Change |
| "A Nonsense Christmas" (Sabrina Carpenter) | 2022 | — | 23 | — | 16 | Fruitcake |
| "Angels (Don't Always Have Wings)" (Thomas Rhett) | 2023 | 69 | — | 83 | — | Where We Started |
| "Espresso" (Sabrina Carpenter) | 2024 | 3 | 1 | 3 | 1 | Short n' Sweet |
| "Lose Control" (Teddy Swims) | 2024 | 1 | 4 | 2 | 2 | I've Tried Everything but Therapy (Part 1) |
| "The Door" (Teddy Swims) | 2024 | 24 | 19 | 16 | 5 | I've Tried Everything but Therapy (Part 1) |
| "After All the Bars Are Closed" (Thomas Rhett) | 2024 | — (Note: "After All the Bars Are Closed" did not enter the Billboard Hot 100, but peaked at number 21 on the Bubbling Under Hot 100.) | — | — | — | About a Woman |
| "Taste"^{[p]} (Sabrina Carpenter) | 2024 | 2 | 1 | 4 | 1 | Short n' Sweet |
| "Bad Dreams" (Teddy Swims) | 2024 | 42 | 30 | 30 | 6 | I've Tried Everything but Therapy (Part 2) |
| "That's So True" (Gracie Abrams) | 2024 | 6 | 1 | 1 | 1 | The Secret of Us (Deluxe) |
| "Somethin' 'Bout a Woman" (Thomas Rhett featuring Teddy Swims) | 2024 | 65 | 99 | — | — | About a Woman |
| "Are You Even Real" (Teddy Swims featuring Giveon) | 2025 | 59 | — | 65 | — | I've Tried Everything but Therapy (Part 2) |
| "Guilty" (Teddy Swims) | 2025 | — (Note: "Guilty" did not enter the Billboard Hot 100, but peaked at number 4 on the Bubbling Under Hot 100.) | — | — | — | I've Tried Everything but Therapy (Part 2) |
| "Leak It" (Flo) | 2026 | — (Note: "Leak It" did not enter the Billboard Hot 100, but peaked at number 26 on the Rhythmic Airplay chart.) | — | — | 45 | Therapy at the Club |

Note

- ^{^[p]} indicates tracks where Bunetta is credited only as a producer.
- ^{^[w]} indicates tracks where Bunetta is credited only as a writer.
