= What More Can I Say (Teddy Swims song) =

2023 single by Teddy Swims

Single by Teddy Swims

from the album I've Tried Everything but Therapy (Part 1)
- Released: May 5, 2023
- Length: 2:21
- Label: Warner
- Songwriters: Jaten Dimsdale; Sean Douglas; Boy Matthews; Andrew Wells
- Producer: Andrew Wells

Teddy Swims singles chronology
"Face Myself" (2023)	"What More Can I Say" (2023)	"Happy People" (2023)

"What More Can I Say" is a song by American singer-songwriter Teddy Swims. It was released on May 5, 2023 as the lead single from his first studio album I've Tried Everything but Therapy (Part 1).

Swims said the song is about trouble he got himself into with his girlfriend over some "compromising" photos of previous relationships he thought he had deleted.

The song was certified Gold in Australia and New Zealand in 2025.

== Reception ==
Michael Major from Broadway World said "A soulful throwback to old-school R&B, the touching track is infused with gospel elements and bluesy guitar - all of which highlight the powerhouse's incomparable vocals."

== Certifications ==
Certifications for "What More Can I Say"
Region	Certification	Certified units/sales
Australia (ARIA)	Gold	35,000^{‡}
Canada (Music Canada)	Gold	40,000^{‡}
New Zealand (RMNZ)	Gold	15,000^{‡}
^{‡} Sales+streaming figures based on certification alone.
