= Lose Control (Teddy Swims song) =

2023 single by Teddy Swims

Single by Teddy Swims

from the album I've Tried Everything but Therapy (Part 1)
- Released: June 23, 2023
- Genre: Soul
- Length: 3:30 (album version); 2:29 (radio edit)
- Label: Warner
- Songwriters: Jaten Dimsdale; Joshua Coleman; Julian Bunetta; Marco Rodriguez-Diaz Jr.; John Sudduth
- Producers: Ammo; Julian Bunetta

Teddy Swims singles chronology
"Happy People" (2023)	"Lose Control" (2023)	"Some Things I'll Never Know" (2023)

Audio sample
- file; help

Lyric video
- "Lose Control" on YouTube

Live video
- "Lose Control" on YouTube

"Lose Control" is a song by American singer-songwriter Teddy Swims, released on June 23, 2023, through Warner Records as the second single from his debut studio album I've Tried Everything but Therapy (Part 1) (2023). The song was co-written by Swims with Joshua Coleman, Marco Rodriguez, Mikky Ekko, and Julian Bunetta, who also produced the song.

Lose Control became a commercial success and was Swims' first song to reach the Billboard Hot 100, debuting at number 99 and peaking at number one in March 2024. This 32-week climb is the longest consecutive climb to number one of all time. It holds both the record for longest charting song on the Billboard Hot 100, with 112 weeks, and the longest charting song in the Billboard Hot 100 top ten, with 80 non-consecutive weeks. The song was ranked number one on the Billboard Year-End Hot 100 singles of 2024 as well as the 2024 year-end singles chart of New Zealand. It also topped the charts in Belgium, Bulgaria, the Commonwealth of Independent States, Switzerland, Luxembourg, and Iceland. It is certified diamond in US, Canada, France, and the Netherlands and platinum or higher in twelve additional countries.

== Background ==
Lose Control was written over a period of four days at a writing camp in Palm Springs, with a big part of the writing process focused on showcasing Swims' powerful vocals.

Teddy Swims explaining the song:

Being in love can be like an addiction sometimes — always chasing the highs from the lows. It's about losing yourself and losing control when it all starts to cave in and thinking that the only way out is through being with that person, chasing that feeling over and over again.

== Awards and nominations ==
Year	Award	Category	Result	Ref.
2024	MTV Video Music Awards	Song of the Year	Nominated	
2024	MTV Video Music Awards	Best Alternative Video	Nominated	
2024	MTV Video Music Awards	Push Performance of the Year	Nominated	
2024	Billboard Music Awards	Top Hot 100 Song	Won	
2024	Billboard Music Awards	Top Streaming Song	Nominated	
2024	Billboard Music Awards	Top Radio Song	Won	
2024	Billboard Music Awards	Top Selling Song	Nominated	
2024	Billboard Music Awards	Top Billboard Global Song	Nominated	
2024	Billboard Music Awards	Top Billboard Global (Excl. US) Song	Nominated	
2024	NRJ Music Awards	International Hit of the Year	Nominated	
2024	NRJ Music Awards	Most Radio Airplay in France	Won	
2024	Los 40 Music Awards	Best International Song	Nominated	
2025	Brit Awards	International Song of the Year	Nominated	

== Track listing ==
"Lose Control" performed live by Teddy Swims in 2023

Streaming/digital download

1. "Lose Control" – 3:30

Streaming/digital download – live

1. "Lose Control" (live) – 4:00
2. "Lose Control" – 3:30

Streaming/digital download – strings version

1. "Lose Control" (strings version) – 3:28

Streaming/digital download – piano version

1. "Lose Control" (piano version) – 3:26
2. "Lose Control" – 3:30
3. "Lose Control" (strings version) – 3:28
4. "Lose Control" (live) – 4:00

Streaming/digital download – slowed down

1. "Lose Control" (slowed down) – 3:56

Streaming/digital download – sped up

1. "Lose Control" (sped up) – 2:55

Streaming/digital download – BBC Radio 1 Live Lounge session

1. "Lose Control" (BBC Radio 1 Live Lounge session) – 3:27

Streaming/digital download – Goddard. remix

1. "Lose Control" (Goddard. remix) – 2:40

Streaming/digital download – instrumental & a cappella

1. "Lose Control" (instrumental) – 3:30
2. "Lose Control" (a capella) – 3:25

Streaming/digital download – live at the Ryman

1. "Lose Control" (live at the Ryman; with Freak Feely) – 5:43

Streaming/digital download – Tiësto remix

1. "Lose Control" (Tiësto remix) – 2:45
2. "Lose Control" (Tiësto extended remix) – 3:28

Streaming/digital download – radio edit

1. "Lose Control" (radio edit) – 2:29

CD maxi single

1. "Lose Control" – 3:30
2. "Lose Control" (live; with Freak Feely) – 5:43
3. "Lose Control" (strings version) – 3:28
4. "Lose Control" (piano version) – 3:26
5. "Lose Control" (a capella) – 3:25
6. "Lose Control" (instrumental) – 3:30

7-inch vinyl

1. "Lose Control" – 3:30
2. "The Door" – 3:32

Streaming/digital download – The Village Sessions

1. "Lose Control - The Village Sessions" – 3:30

== Charts ==
=== Weekly charts ===
Weekly chart performance
Chart (2023–2026)	Peak position
Argentina Hot 100 (Billboard)	32
Australia (ARIA)	4
Austria (Ö3 Austria Top 40)	5
Belarus Airplay (TopHit)	5
Belgium (Ultratop 50 Flanders)	1
Belgium (Ultratop 50 Wallonia)	1
Brazil Hot 100 (Billboard)	42
Bulgaria Airplay (PROPHON)	1
Canada Hot 100 (Billboard)	2
Canada AC (Billboard)	1
Canada CHR/Top 40 (Billboard)	1
Canada Hot AC (Billboard)	1
CIS Airplay (TopHit)	1
Croatia International Airplay (Top lista)	4
Czech Republic Airplay (ČNS IFPI)	1
Czech Republic Singles Digital (ČNS IFPI)	11
Denmark (Tracklisten)	7
Estonia Airplay (TopHit)	1
Finland Airplay (Radiosoittolista)	12
France (SNEP)	6
Germany (GfK)	6
Global 200 (Billboard)	4
Greece International (IFPI)	3
Hungary (Rádiós Top 40)	1
Hungary (Single Top 40)	29
Iceland (Tónlistinn)	1
Ireland (IRMA)	4
Israel (Mako Hitlist)	24
Italy (FIMI)	48
Kazakhstan Airplay (TopHit)	10
Latvia Airplay (LaIPA)	7
Latvia Streaming (LaIPA)	6
Lebanon (Lebanese Top 20)	7
Lithuania (AGATA)	8
Luxembourg (Billboard)	1
Malta Airplay (Radiomonitor)	5
Moldova Airplay (TopHit)	6
Netherlands (Dutch Top 40)	2
Netherlands (Single Top 100)	3
New Zealand (Recorded Music NZ)	3
Nigeria (TurnTable Top 100)	100
North Macedonia Airplay (Radiomonitor)	5
Norway (VG-lista)	6
Panama Streaming (PRODUCE)	172
Poland (Polish Airplay Top 100)	2
Poland (Polish Streaming Top 100)	10
Portugal (AFP)	5
Romania Airplay (UPFR)	6
Romania Airplay (Media Forest)	1
Romania TV Airplay (Media Forest)	1
Russia Airplay (TopHit)	3
San Marino Airplay (SMRTV Top 50)	21
Serbia Airplay (Radiomonitor)	2
Slovakia Airplay (ČNS IFPI)	4
Slovakia Singles Digital (ČNS IFPI)	10
Slovenia Airplay (Radiomonitor)	1
South Africa Streaming (TOSAC)	10
Spain (Promusicae)	40
Spain Airplay (PROMUSICAE)	1
Sweden (Sverigetopplistan)	10
Switzerland (Schweizer Hitparade)	1
Ukraine Airplay (TopHit)	17
United Arab Emirates (IFPI)	10
UK Singles (Official Charts)	2
US Billboard Hot 100	1
US Adult Contemporary (Billboard)	1
US Adult Pop Airplay (Billboard)	1
US Dance Airplay (Billboard)	21
US Pop Airplay (Billboard)	1
US R&B/Hip-Hop Airplay (Billboard)	8
US Rhythmic Airplay (Billboard)	13
US Rock & Alternative Airplay (Billboard)	24

=== Monthly charts ===
Monthly chart performance
Chart (2023–2026)	Peak position
Belarus Airplay (TopHit)	8
Brazil Streaming (Pro-Música Brasil)	47
CIS (TopHit)	2
Czech Republic (Rádio Top 100)	4
Czech Republic (Singles Digitál Top 100)	17
Estonia Airplay (TopHit)	1
Kazakhstan Airplay (TopHit)	15
Lithuania Airplay (TopHit)	1
Moldova Airplay (TopHit)	7
Panama Streaming (PRODUCE)	199
Romania Airplay (TopHit)	3
Russia Airplay (TopHit)	6
Slovakia (Rádio Top 100)	6
Slovakia (Singles Digitál Top 100)	13
Ukraine Airplay (TopHit)	19

=== Year-end charts ===
Year-end chart performance
Chart (2023)	Position
Belgium (Ultratop 50 Flanders)	67
CIS Airplay (TopHit)	105
Netherlands (Dutch Top 40)	19
Netherlands (Single Top 100)	67
Romania Airplay (TopHit)	37
Russia Airplay (TopHit)	102
US Digital Song Sales (Billboard)	59

Chart (2024)	Position
Australia (ARIA)	5
Austria (Ö3 Austria Top 40)	4
Belarus Airplay (TopHit)	18
Belgium (Ultratop 50 Flanders)	12
Belgium (Ultratop 50 Wallonia)	2
Bulgaria Airplay (PROPHON)	1
Canada (Canadian Hot 100)	3
CIS Airplay (TopHit)	3
Denmark (Tracklisten)	5
Estonia Airplay (TopHit)	1
France (SNEP)	11
Germany (GfK)	12
Global 200 (Billboard)	2
Global Singles (IFPI)	3
Hungary (Single Top 40)	59
Iceland (Tónlistinn)	2
Italy (FIMI)	64
Lithuania Airplay (TopHit)	5
Moldova Airplay (TopHit)	87
Netherlands (Dutch Top 40)	50
Netherlands (Single Top 100)	7
New Zealand (Recorded Music NZ)	1
Poland (Polish Airplay Top 100)	6
Poland (Polish Streaming Top 100)	17
Portugal (AFP)	5
Romania Airplay (TopHit)	2
Russia Airplay (TopHit)	43
South Africa (TOSAC)	11
Spain (PROMUSICAE)	46
Spain Airplay (PROMUSICAE)	2
Sweden (Sverigetopplistan)	7
Switzerland (Schweizer Hitparade)	2
UK Singles (OCC)	4
Ukraine Airplay (TopHit)	50
US Billboard Hot 100	1
US Adult Alternative Airplay (Billboard)	13
US Adult Contemporary (Billboard)	5
US Adult Top 40 (Billboard)	1
US Mainstream Top 40 (Billboard)	2
US Rhythmic (Billboard)	40
World Single Chart (Mediatraffic)	4

Chart (2025)	Position
Argentina Anglo Airplay (Monitor Latino)	66
Australia (ARIA)	24
Austria (Ö3 Austria Top 40)	32
Belarus Airplay (TopHit)	102
Belgium (Ultratop 50 Flanders)	79
Belgium (Ultratop 50 Wallonia)	81
Canada (Canadian Hot 100)	12
Canada AC (Billboard)	49
Canada Hot AC (Billboard)	38
CIS Airplay (TopHit)	66
Estonia Airplay (TopHit)	31
France (SNEP)	60
Germany (GfK)	68
Global 200 (Billboard)	6
Hungary (Rádiós Top 40)	41
Iceland (Tónlistinn)	38
Moldova Airplay (TopHit)	153
Netherlands (Single Top 100)	25
Poland (Polish Streaming Top 100)	57
Romania Airplay (TopHit)	36
Sweden (Sverigetopplistan)	18
Switzerland (Schweizer Hitparade)	13
UK Singles (OCC)	14
US Billboard Hot 100	4
US Adult Contemporary (Billboard)	1
World Single Chart (Mediatraffic)	18

== Certifications ==
Certifications for "Lose Control"
Region	Certification	Certified units/sales
Australia (ARIA)	12× Platinum	840,000^{‡}
Austria (IFPI Austria)	3× Platinum	90,000^{‡}
Belgium (BRMA)	Platinum	40,000^{‡}
Canada (Music Canada)	Diamond	800,000^{‡}
Denmark (IFPI Danmark)	3× Platinum	270,000^{‡}
France (SNEP)	Diamond	333,333^{‡}
Germany (BVMI)	Platinum	600,000^{‡}
Italy (FIMI)	Platinum	100,000^{‡}
Netherlands (NVPI)	Diamond	232,500^{‡}
New Zealand (RMNZ)	10× Platinum	300,000^{‡}
Poland (ZPAV)	4× Platinum	200,000^{‡}
Poland (ZPAV) Live version	Gold	25,000^{‡}
Portugal (AFP)	7× Platinum	70,000^{‡}
Spain (Promusicae)	3× Platinum	180,000^{‡}
Switzerland (IFPI Switzerland)	5× Platinum	100,000^{‡}
United Kingdom (BPI)	5× Platinum	3,000,000^{‡}
United States (RIAA)	11× Platinum	11,000,000^{‡}
Streaming
Greece (IFPI Greece)	4× Platinum	8,000,000^{†}
Worldwide	—	1,700,000,000
^{‡} Sales+streaming figures based on certification alone.^{†} Streaming-only figures based on certification alone.

== Release history ==
Release dates and formats for "Lose Control"
Region	Date	Format(s)	Version	Label	Ref.
Various	June 23, 2023	Digital download; streaming	Original	Warner	
Various	July 14, 2023	Digital download; streaming	Live	Warner	
Various	July 28, 2023	Digital download; streaming	Strings version	Warner	
Various	August 25, 2023	Digital download; streaming	Piano version	Warner	
United States	October 24, 2023	Contemporary hit radio	Original	Warner	
Various	February 14, 2024	Digital download; streaming	Slowed down; sped up	Warner	
Various	February 15, 2024	Digital download; streaming	BBC Radio 1 Live Lounge session	Warner	
Various	February 16, 2024	Digital download; streaming	Goddard. remix	Warner	
Various	March 1, 2024	Digital download; streaming	Instrumental; a capella	Warner	
Various	March 5, 2024	Digital download; streaming	Live at the Ryman	Warner	
Various	March 19, 2024	Digital download; streaming	Tiësto remix; Tiësto extended remix	Warner	
Various	March 21, 2024	Digital download; streaming	Radio edit	Warner	
United States	April 26, 2024	CD maxi	Original; live at the Ryman; strings version; piano version; a capella; instrumental	Warner	
United States	April 26, 2024	7-inch	Original	Warner	
Various	August 23, 2024	Digital download; streaming	The Village Sessions	Warner	
