= The Door (Teddy Swims song) =

2024 single by Teddy Swims

- Tiago PZK version cover artwork

Single by Teddy Swims

from the album I've Tried Everything but Therapy (Part 1)
- Released: 17 April 2024
- Genre: Pop; soul; R&B
- Length: 3:32
- Label: Warner
- Songwriters: Jaten Dimsdale; John Ryan; John Sudduth; Joshua Coleman; Julian Bunetta; Sherwyn Nicholls
- Producers: Ammo; Julian Bunetta

Teddy Swims singles chronology
"Some Things I'll Never Know" (2023)	"The Door" (2024)	"Funeral" (2024)

Music video
- "The Door" on YouTube

Live performance
- "The Door" on YouTube

"The Door" is a song by American singer-songwriter Teddy Swims. The song was first released on September 15, 2023 on his debut studio album I've Tried Everything but Therapy (Part 1) as a track, and was later released in April 2024 as the album's third single. The song details Swims' reflection on saving his own life and finding the strength to leave an abusive relationship that had contributed to pushing his friends and family away.

"The Door" topped the airplay charts in Bulgaria, Kazakhstan, and Russia. The song also reached the top ten charts in the United Kingdom, Hungary, Belgium, the Netherlands, and Ireland, as well as the airplay charts in Croatia, Poland, Czech Republic, the Commonwealth of Independent States, Belarus, and Romania. Moreover, the song received numerous certifications in several countries.

== Background and composition ==
"The Door" was written by Swims, together with John Ryan, John Sudduth, Sherwyn Nicholls, Joshua Coleman, and Julian Bunetta, with the latter two producing the song. The song was described by Swims as about saving his own life and finding the courage to walk out on an abusive relationship that played a part in driving his friends and family out of his life. He further said: "It was so hard to convince myself of that at the moment, but that’s when my priorities shifted from her to me, to saving myself, to loving myself again. ‘The Door’ is about believing that you're always going to be okay if you trust in yourself."

== Release ==
Swims released "The Door" as part of his debut album, I've Tried Everything But Therapy (Part 1), as a track on September 15, 2023. Days later, Swims uploaded a live version of the song on YouTube. The song was later released as a single on April 17, 2024. Warner serviced the song for radio airplay in Italy on May 10, 2024.

== Reception ==
In an interview with Rolling Stone, Alex Tear described "The Door" as a song that "just won't stop". He also called the song a "casual haunt that comes up behind you and it stays." PopFiltr described it as a song which "offers a surprising juxtaposition of upbeat melodies and a powerful message." They further added that "The Door" is a track that "challenges the listener to confront their own emotional boundaries, wrapped in an up-beat, almost paradoxical musical arrangement."

== Awards and nominations ==
Year	Award	Category	Result	Ref.
2025	Los 40 Music Awards	Best International Song	Nominated	

== Track listing ==
Digital download/streaming

1. "The Door" – 3:32

Digital download/streaming – Tiago PZK version

1. "The Door" (Tiago PZK version) – 3:32

Digital download/streaming – Cyril remix

1. "The Door" (Cyril remix) – 3:30
2. "The Door" – 3:32

Digital download/streaming – Stripped

1. "The Door" (Stripped) – 3:34

== Credits and personnel ==
- Joshua Coleman – songwriter, background vocals, producer, vocal producer, drums, keyboards
- Julian Bunetta – songwriter, producer, vocal producer, drums, keyboards, bass
- Teddy Swims – songwriter, background vocals
- John Ryan – songwriter
- John Sudduth – songwriter
- Sherwyn Nicholls – songwriter
- Alex Ghenea – mixing engineer
- Jeff Gunnell – recording engineer
- Nathan Dantzler – mastering engineer

== Charts ==
=== Weekly charts ===
Weekly chart performance for "The Door"
Chart (2024–2026)	Peak position
Argentina Hot 100 (Billboard)	40
Australia (ARIA)	19
Austria (Ö3 Austria Top 40)	44
Belarus Airplay (TopHit)	2
Belgium (Ultratop 50 Flanders)	6
Belgium (Ultratop 50 Wallonia)	10
Brazil International Pop Airplay (Crowley Charts)	8
Bulgaria Airplay (PROPHON)	1
Canada Hot 100 (Billboard)	16
Canada AC (Billboard)	5
Canada CHR/Top 40 (Billboard)	2
Canada Hot AC (Billboard)	7
Canada Modern Rock (Billboard Canada)	31
CIS Airplay (TopHit)	2
Croatia International Airplay (Top lista)	7
Czech Republic Airplay (ČNS IFPI)	2
Czech Republic Singles Digital (ČNS IFPI)	36
Denmark Airplay (Tracklisten)	19
Estonia Airplay (TopHit)	18
Finland Airplay (Radiosoittolista)	12
France (SNEP)	49
Germany (GfK)	68
Global 200 (Billboard)	31
Greece International (IFPI)	11
Hungary (Rádiós Top 40)	1
Hungary (Single Top 40)	22
Iceland (Tónlistinn)	30
Ireland (IRMA)	8
Kazakhstan Airplay (TopHit)	1
Latvia Airplay (LaIPA)	13
Lithuania (AGATA)	31
Lithuania Airplay (TopHit)	28
Luxembourg (Billboard)	20
Malta Airplay (Radiomonitor)	7
Moldova Airplay (TopHit)	34
Netherlands (Dutch Top 40)	6
Netherlands (Single Top 100)	20
New Zealand (Recorded Music NZ)	16
Norway (VG-lista)	58
Poland Airplay (OLiS)	9
Poland Streaming (OLiS)	53
Portugal (AFP)	37
Romania (Billboard)	20
Romania Airplay (Media Forest)	4
Romania TV Airplay (Media Forest)	5
Russia Airplay (TopHit)	1
Serbia Airplay (Radiomonitor)	1
Slovakia Airplay (ČNS IFPI)	41
Slovakia Singles Digital (ČNS IFPI)	40
Spain (Promusicae)	68
Sweden (Sverigetopplistan)	18
Switzerland (Schweizer Hitparade)	20
Ukraine Airplay (TopHit)	56
UK Singles (Official Charts)	5
US Billboard Hot 100	24
US Adult Alternative Airplay (Billboard)	3
US Adult Contemporary (Billboard)	16
US Adult Pop Airplay (Billboard)	5
US Dance Airplay (Billboard)	40
US Pop Airplay (Billboard)	9
US Rock & Alternative Airplay (Billboard)	26
Venezuela Airplay (Record Report)	30
Venezuela Rock Airplay (Record Report)	1

Weekly chart performance for "The Door (Cyril Remix)"
Chart (2024)	Peak position
CIS Airplay (TopHit)	148
Estonia Airplay (TopHit)	141
Latvia Airplay (TopHit)	15
Lithuania Airplay (TopHit)	57
New Zealand Hot Singles (RMNZ)	22
Russia Airplay (TopHit)	129

=== Monthly charts ===
Monthly chart performance for "The Door"
Chart (2024–2025)	Peak position
Belarus Airplay (TopHit)	5
CIS Airplay (TopHit)	2
Czech Republic (Rádio Top 100)	3
Czech Republic (Singles Digitál Top 100)	97
Estonia Airplay (TopHit)	27
Kazakhstan Airplay (TopHit)	1
Latvia Airplay (TopHit) Cyril Remix	15
Lithuania Airplay (TopHit)	28
Lithuania Airplay (TopHit) Cyril Remix	70
Moldova Airplay (TopHit)	64
Romania Airplay (TopHit)	16
Russia Airplay (TopHit)	1
Slovakia (Rádio Top 100)	45
Slovakia (Singles Digitál Top 100)	64
Ukraine Airplay (TopHit)	59

=== Year-end charts ===
2024 year-end chart performance for "The Door"
Chart (2024)	Position
Belarus Airplay (TopHit)	26
Belgium (Ultratop 50 Flanders)	13
Belgium (Ultratop 50 Wallonia)	27
Bulgaria Airplay (PROPHON)	7
Canada (Canadian Hot 100)	72
CIS Airplay (TopHit)	7
Estonia Airplay (TopHit)	53
France (SNEP)	84
Global 200 (Billboard)	171
Hungary (Radios Top 40)	26
Iceland (Tónlistinn)	83
Kazakhstan Airplay (TopHit)	12
Latvia Airplay (TopHit)	54
Lithuania Airplay (TopHit)	82
Netherlands (Dutch Top 40)	8
Netherlands (Single Top 100)	20
New Zealand (Recorded Music NZ)	49
Poland (Polish Airplay Top 100)	72
Portugal (AFP)	147
Romania Airplay (TopHit)	19
Russia Airplay (TopHit)	6
Sweden (Sverigetopplistan)	85
Switzerland (Schweizer Hitparade)	72
UK Singles (OCC)	32
US Adult Contemporary (Billboard)	46
US Adult Top 40 (Billboard)	17
US Digital Song Sales (Billboard)	37
US Mainstream Top 40 (Billboard)	48
Venezuela Rock Airplay (Record Report)	20

2025 year-end chart performance for "The Door"
Chart (2025)	Position
Argentina Anglo Airplay (Monitor Latino)	77
Australia (ARIA)	42
Belarus Airplay (TopHit)	18
Belgium (Ultratop 50 Flanders)	96
Belgium (Ultratop 50 Wallonia)	126
Canada (Canadian Hot 100)	35
Canada AC (Billboard)	15
Canada CHR/Top 40 (Billboard)	33
Canada Hot AC (Billboard)	49
Canada Modern Rock (Billboard)	84
CIS Airplay (TopHit)	73
Estonia Airplay (TopHit)	104
France (SNEP)	145
Global 200 (Billboard)	30
Hungary (Rádiós Top 40)	1
Hungary (Single Top 40)	44
Kazakhstan Airplay (TopHit)	117
Lithuania Airplay (TopHit)	118
Netherlands (Single Top 100)	33
Romania Airplay (TopHit)	76
Russia Airplay (TopHit)	196
Sweden (Sverigetopplistan)	25
Switzerland (Schweizer Hitparade)	18
UK Singles (OCC)	21
US Adult Contemporary (Billboard)	41

== Certifications ==
Certifications for "The Door"
Region	Certification	Certified units/sales
Australia (ARIA)	5× Platinum	350,000^{‡}
Austria (IFPI Austria)	Gold	15,000^{‡}
Canada (Music Canada)	7× Platinum	560,000^{‡}
Denmark (IFPI Danmark)	Platinum	90,000^{‡}
France (SNEP)	Diamond	333,333^{‡}
Germany (BVMI)	Gold	300,000^{‡}
Italy (FIMI)	Gold	100,000^{‡}
Netherlands (NVPI)	Platinum	93,000^{‡}
New Zealand (RMNZ)	4× Platinum	120,000^{‡}
Poland (ZPAV)	2× Platinum	250,000^{‡}
Portugal (AFP)	3× Platinum	30,000^{‡}
Spain (Promusicae)	2× Platinum	200,000^{‡}
Switzerland (IFPI Switzerland)	Platinum	30,000^{‡}
United Kingdom (BPI)	3× Platinum	1,800,000^{‡}
United States (RIAA)	4× Platinum	4,000,000^{‡}
Streaming
Greece (IFPI Greece)	2× Platinum	4,000,000^{†}
^{‡} Sales+streaming figures based on certification alone.^{†} Streaming-only figures based on certification alone.

== Release history ==
Release dates and formats for "The Door"
Region	Date	Format(s)	Version	Label	Ref.
Various	April 17, 2024	Digital download; streaming	Original	Warner	
Italy	May 10, 2024	Radio airplay	Original	Warner	
Various	June 14, 2024	Digital download; streaming	Tiago PZK version	Warner	
Various	July 26, 2024	Digital download; streaming	Cyril remix	Warner	
Various	August 16, 2024	Digital download; streaming	Stripped	Warner	
