= I've Tried Everything but Therapy (Part 1) =

Studio album by Teddy Swims
- Released: September 15, 2023
- Recorded: 2022–2023
- Studios: United (Los Angeles); The Perch (Calabasas); The Nest (Nashville); Wendy House (London); The Troy House (Los Angeles); Good Lander (Nashville); The Playpen (Calabasas)
- Length: 31:12
- Label: Warner
- Producers: Ammo; Julian Bunetta; Stuart Crichton; Kendo; John Ryan; Marc Scibilia; Shweez; Sherwyn; Eli Teplin; Andrew Wells

Teddy Swims chronology
Sleep Is Exhausting (2022)	I've Tried Everything but Therapy (Part 1) (2023)	I've Tried Everything but Therapy (Part 2) (2025)

Singles from I've Tried Everything but Therapy (Part 1)
- 1. "What More Can I Say" Released: May 5, 2023; 2. "Lose Control" Released: June 23, 2023; 3. "The Door" Released: June 14, 2024

I've Tried Everything but Therapy (Part 1) is the first half of the debut studio album by American singer and songwriter Teddy Swims. It was released on September 15, 2023, through Warner. It features his breakout single "Lose Control", which topped the US Billboard Hot 100, while also reaching the top ten in twenty-three countries including the UK Singles Chart.

The album also reached the top ten in Norway, the Netherlands, Lithuania, Sweden, Australia and subsequently entered the charts in New Zealand, Belgium, Canada, France, Lithuania, Sweden, Scotland, United Kingdom and the United States. The album is followed by I've Tried Everything but Therapy (Part 2), which released on January 24, 2025.

== Background and promotion ==
Ahead of its release, Swims released the singles "What More Can I Say" on May 5, 2023, and "Lose Control", an "emotional anthem" about "losing yourself and losing control", on June 23. The latter proved to be commercially successful, reaching the charts in multiple countries, including Canada, the Netherlands, New Zealand and the United States. In an interview with The New Zealand Herald, Swims promised in an interview that he would put himself "into therapy", which was ultimately the inspiration behind the album title. He wanted to buy himself a "couple more months of freedom" and be a "traumatised little shit". Asked about his favorite song he's ever written by American Songwriter, Swims named the album opener "Some Things I'll Never Know". In promotion of the album, the singer-songwriter performed a live set of his songs and a cover of "Use Somebody" at Nova on August 30, 2023. The record is also promoted by his I've Tried Everything but Therapy Tour, which took place across North America in November 2023.

=== I've Tried Everything but Therapy (Part 1.5) ===
On April 26, 2024, Swims released I've Tried Everything but Therapy (Part 1.5), an extension to Part 1 of the album which features four additional tracks. Swims said upon release, "You know, I've been touring, writing, and continuing to work on myself over the past 8 months and wanted to share something like a real-life check-in. These songs represent where I'm at and I didn't want to wait till I had the whole part 2 done — so here you go."

=== Tour ===
In March 2023, Swims announced his I've Tried Everything but Therapy international headline tour, including shows in the UK, Ireland, Australia, Germany, the Netherlands, and New Zealand.

== Awards and nominations ==
Year	Award	Category	Result	Ref.
2024	Los 40 Music Awards	Best International Album	Won	

== Track listing ==
I've Tried Everything but Therapy (Part 1) track listing
No.	Title	Writer(s)	Producer(s)	Length
1.	"Some Things I'll Never Know"	Jaten Dimsdale; John Ryan; Eli Teplin; Sherwyn Nicholls; Joshua Coleman; Julian Bunetta; Kendrick Nicholls	Bunetta^{[p]}; Teplin; Shweez	4:02
2.	"Lose Control"	Coleman; Bunetta; Dimsdale; Mikky Ekko; Marco Rodriguez	Ammo; Bunetta^{[p]}; Infamous^{[c]}	3:30
3.	"What More Can I Say"	Dimsdale; Andrew Wells; Boy Matthews; Sean Douglas	Wells; Khari Mateen^{[a]}	2:21
4.	"The Door"	Coleman; Bunetta; Ryan; Dimsdale; Ekko; S. Nicholls	Bunetta^{[p]}; Ammo^{[p]}	3:32
5.	"Goodbye's Been Good to You"	Dimsdale; Marc Scibilia; Dallas Wilson; Austin Ruffin	Scibilia; Wells	2:44
6.	"Last Communion"	Andrew Jackson; Duck Blackwell; Dimsdale	Jackson; Blackwell	3:37
7.	"You Still Get to Me"	Dimsdale; Tommy Lee James; Douglas; Stuart Crichton	Crichton	3:28
8.	"Suitcase"	Ryan; Ekko; Coleman; Dimsdale	Ryan^{[p]}	2:48
9.	"Flame"	Ryan; Mags Duval; Steph Jones	Ryan	2:24
10.	"Evergreen"	Ryan; Dimsdale; K. Nicholls; S. Nicholls; Teplin	Ryan; Teplin; Kendo	2:46
Total length:				31:12

I've Tried Everything but Therapy (Part 1.5) track listing — Bonus tracks
No.	Title	Writer(s)	Producer(s)	Length
11.	"Hammer to the Heart"	Dimsdale; Bunetta; Ekko; Matt Zara; Rocky Block	Bunetta; Zara	3:12
12.	"Apple Juice"	Dimsdale; Bunetta; Delacey; Ido Zmishlany	Bunetta; Zmishlany	3:02
13.	"Tell Me"	Dimsdale; Block; Bunetta; Ryan	Bunetta; Ryan; Zara	2:56
14.	"Growing Up Is Getting Old"	Dimsdale; Block; Bunetta; Jones; K. Nicholls	Bunetta; Two Fresh	2:27
Total length:				42:49

Notes

- ^{^[p]} signifies a primary and vocal producer.
- ^{^[c]} signifies a co-producer.
- ^{^[a]} signifies an additional producer.

== Personnel ==
Credits adapted from the album's liner notes.

=== Musicians ===
- Teddy Swims – vocals (all tracks), background vocals (tracks 4, 7, 8, 10)
- Julian Bunetta – background vocals, Foley (track 1); bass, drums, keyboards (2, 4); guitar, synthesizer (2)
- Eli Teplin – keyboards (tracks 1, 10), background vocals (10)
- Ammo – Foley (track 1); background vocals, drums, keyboards (2, 4); string programming (2)
- Mikky Ekko – background vocals, drums (track 2)
- Infamous – keyboards (track 2)
- Andrew Wells – guitar, bass (tracks 3, 5); drums, synthesizers (3); percussion (5)
- Khari Mateen – string arrangement, cello, percussion (tracks 3, 5); background vocals (5)
- Tommy King – organ, piano (track 5)
- Cassidy Turbin – drums (track 5)
- Andrew Jackson – background vocals (track 6)
- Jesse Hampton – guitars (track 7)
- John Ryan – drums, guitar, programming, background vocals (tracks 8–10); synthesizer (8, 9); bass, keyboards (8); piano (9)
- Ragnar Rosinkranz – strings (tracks 8, 10)
- Sean Erick – trumpet (track 9)
- Kendo – background vocals (track 10)
- Shweez – background vocals (track 10)
- Kendrick Nicholls – bass (track 10)

=== Technical ===
- Nathan Dantzler – mastering
- Jeff Gunnell – mixing (tracks 1, 10), engineering (1, 2, 4, 8, 9)
- Serban Ghenea – mixing (track 2)
- Alex Ghenea – mixing (tracks 3–9)
- Julian Bunetta – engineering (track 2)
- Andrew Wells – engineering (tracks 3, 5)
- Marc Scibilia – engineering (track 5)
- Andrew Jackson – engineering (track 6)
- Duck Blackwell – engineering (track 6)
- Stuart Crichton – engineering (track 7)
- John Ryan – engineering (tracks 8, 10)
- Hector "Tor" Fernandez – vocal recording (track 6)
- Bryce Bordone – mixing assistance (track 2)
- Johnny Morgan – engineering assistance (track 1)
- Eric Ruscinski – engineering assistance (track 3)
- Jesse Munsat – engineering assistance (tracks 8, 10)

=== Visuals ===
- Joseph Cultice – photography
- Aaron Marsh – layout design

== Charts ==
=== Weekly charts ===
Weekly chart performance for I've Tried Everything but Therapy (Part 1)
Chart (2023–2025)	Peak position
Australian Albums (ARIA)	4
Austrian Albums (Ö3 Austria)	58
Belgian Albums (Ultratop Flanders)	34
Belgian Albums (Ultratop Wallonia)	42
Canadian Albums (Billboard)	15
Croatian International Albums (HDU)	5
Croatian International Albums (HDU) I've Tried Everything But Therapy (Part 1.5)	14
Czech Albums (ČNS IFPI)	29
Danish Albums (Hitlisten)	9
Dutch Albums (Album Top 100)	2
Finnish Albums (Suomen virallinen lista)	36
French Albums (SNEP)	17
German Albums (Offizielle Top 100)	31
Hungarian Albums (MAHASZ)	19
Icelandic Albums (Tónlistinn)	13
Irish Albums (Official Charts)	44
Italian Albums (FIMI)	72
Lithuanian Albums (AGATA)	7
New Zealand Albums (RMNZ)	6
Norwegian Albums (VG-lista)	5
Polish Albums (ZPAV)	20
Portugal (AFP)	56
Scottish Albums (Official Charts)	6
Slovak Albums (ČNS IFPI)	23
Spanish Albums (Promusicae)	67
Swedish Albums (Sverigetopplistan)	4
Swiss Albums (Schweizer Hitparade)	29
UK Albums (Official Charts)	12
US Billboard 200	17

=== Year-end charts ===
2024 year-end chart performance for I've Tried Everything but Therapy (Part 1)
Chart (2024)	Position
Australian Albums (ARIA)	100
Belgian Albums (Ultratop Flanders)	74
Belgian Albums (Ultratop Wallonia)	165
Canadian Albums (Billboard)	31
Danish Albums (Hitlisten)	15
Dutch Albums (Album Top 100)	3
French Albums (SNEP)	32
German Albums (Offizielle Top 100)	49
Hungarian Albums (MAHASZ)	43
Icelandic Albums (Tónlistinn)	22
New Zealand Albums (RMNZ)	38
Polish Albums (ZPAV)	49
Swedish Albums (Sverigetopplistan)	6
Swiss Albums (Schweizer Hitparade)	87
UK Albums (OCC)	34
US Billboard 200	38

2025 year-end chart performance for I've Tried Everything but Therapy (Part 1)
Chart (2025)	Position
Belgian Albums (Ultratop Flanders)	120
Canadian Albums (Billboard)	26
Dutch Albums (Album Top 100)	12
French Albums (SNEP)	68
German Albums (Offizielle Top 100)	80
Hungarian Albums (MAHASZ)	44
Icelandic Albums (Tónlistinn)	36
Polish Albums (ZPAV)	84
Swedish Albums (Sverigetopplistan)	10
UK Albums (OCC)	73
US Billboard 200	32

== Certifications ==
Certifications for I've Tried Everything but Therapy (Part 1)
Region	Certification	Certified units/sales
Belgium (BRMA)	Gold	10,000^{‡}
Canada (Music Canada)	3× Platinum	240,000^{‡}
Denmark (IFPI Danmark)	2× Platinum	40,000^{‡}
France (SNEP)	Platinum	100,000^{‡}
Germany (BVMI)	Gold	75,000^{‡}
Italy (FIMI)	Gold	25,000^{‡}
Netherlands (NVPI)	Diamond	93,000^{‡}
New Zealand (RMNZ)	Platinum	15,000^{‡}
United Kingdom (BPI)	Platinum	300,000^{‡}
United States (RIAA)	2× Platinum	2,000,000^{‡}
^{‡} Sales+streaming figures based on certification alone.
