= Teddy Swims =

American singer and songwriter (born 1992)

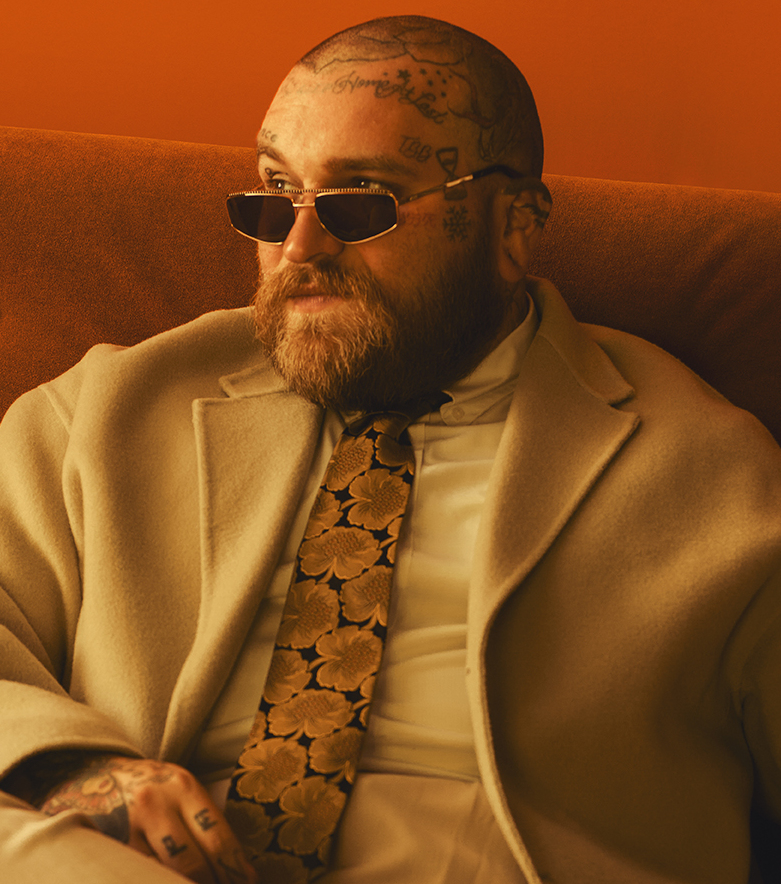
- Swims in 2023

Background information
- Born: Jaten Collin Dimsdale; September 25, 1992 (age 34); Conyers, Georgia, U.S.
- Genres: Pop; R&B; soul
- Occupations: Singer; songwriter
- Instruments: Vocals; piano; ukulele
- Years active: 2019–present
- Label: Warner
- Formerly of: WildHeart, Elefvnts
- Website: www.teddyswims.com

Jaten Collin Dimsdale (born September 25, 1992), known professionally as Teddy Swims, is an American singer and songwriter. Known for creating genre-blending music that includes elements of R&B, soul, hip-hop, and contemporary pop, Swims originally began to attract fans by posting song covers on YouTube during 2019 and 2020. Swims' third extended play, Tough Love (2022), became his first entry on the Billboard 200.

Swims rose to prominence in 2023 with the release of the hit single "Lose Control", which peaked within the top ten of the charts in several countries and topped the Billboard Hot 100 the next year. The song preceded the release of Swims's debut studio album, I've Tried Everything but Therapy (Part 1) (2023), which was released by Warner Records and entered the top ten of the album charts in Australia and the Netherlands. In 2024, MTV named Swims its "Push Artist of February".

== Early life ==
Swims was born and raised in Conyers, Georgia, on September 25, 1992. His maternal grandfather was a Pentecostal minister. His father introduced him to soul music at an early age by way of artists such as Marvin Gaye, Stevie Wonder, and Al Green. High school musical theater provided him an avenue into performing. Offstage, he would review YouTube videos of his favorite singers with a couple of supportive teachers to help develop his vocal technique and presentation. Swims' family were American football enthusiasts; he had been playing football for ten years when, during his second year at Salem High School, one of his teachers suggested he and a few of his teammates sign up for a musical theater class. The teacher also said he should join the chorus.

Swims discovered his passion for performance through his experience in high-school theater, where he performed in musicals such as Joseph and the Amazing Technicolor Dreamcoat and Rent, as well as Shakespeare plays. He began playing instruments including piano and ukulele, and watched YouTube videos of singers to help develop his vocal technique.

== Career ==
=== 2019: Early career and Tyler Carter tour ===
Swims began his music career in 2019. Swims' friend Addy Maxwell invited him to rap over some beats he had made, which earned the pair an opening slot on a U.S. tour with Tyler Carter. He adopted the stage name "Swims" from internet forum-speak—an acronym for "Someone Who Isn't Me Sometimes"—as a way to perform in character.

In June, Swims posted his first cover performance on YouTube, Michael Jackson's "Rock with You", and continued posting additional covers of artists from a mix of genres, including Lewis Capaldi, Chris Stapleton, Amy Winehouse, and H.E.R. His cover of Shania Twain's "You're Still the One" posted in October became his most viewed video, with 167 million views as of January 2024. His videos accumulated millions of views quickly and after releasing one single "Night Off" independently in July, he signed a record deal with Warner Records in December.

=== 2020–2022: Unlearning and Tough Love EPs ===
Swims released his debut major-label single, "Picky", in January 2020 and embarked on his first headline tour that month. He released several covers in the following months, including "Blinding Lights" in May, "What's Going On" in June (the royalties from which he donated to the NAACP Legal Defense and Educational Fund), and "You're Still the One" (which he had previously posted on YouTube) in July. Swims released his next single, "Broke", in August, and an additional version with Thomas Rhett in October. In February 2021, Swims released his single "My Bad", which he performed on The Kelly Clarkson Show, and was named an "Artist You Need to Know" by Rolling Stone magazine. In March he released his single "Till I Change Your Mind", followed by "Bed On Fire" in April, which he performed on The Late Show with Stephen Colbert and later re-released as a collaboration with Ingrid Andress. In May, Swims released his debut seven-track EP Unlearning, followed by a tour supporting Zac Brown Band that summer. In August 2021, Swims released his single "Simple Things", which he performed on The Late Late Show with James Corden in September and Today in November.

After releasing his single "911", Swims released his six-track EP Tough Love in January 2022. He performed "Love for a Minute" on Late Night with Seth Meyers in January and "911" on The Ellen DeGeneres Show in February. Swims supported the EP with a three-month headline tour of Europe and North America beginning in February, followed by a United Kingdom and mainland Europe tour in May and June. He collaborated with Meghan Trainor on "Bad for Me", released on June 24 as the lead single for her album Takin' It Back. Swims and Trainor performed the song on Jimmy Kimmel Live! in June and The Late Late Show with James Corden in August. Swims also collaborated on singles with Mitchell Tenpenny, Illenium, MK and Burns, and Telykast. After releasing a short performance clip in May, Swims released a cover of Journey's "Don't Stop Believin'" in August. He performed the song on America's Got Talent alongside season 14 winner Kodi Lee and Journey guitarist Neal Schon. In September Swims embarked on a seven-week US headline tour.

After releasing the singles "Dose", "2 Moods", "Someone Who Loved You", and "Devil in a Dress", Swims released his EP Sleep Is Exhausting on November 4, 2022.

=== 2023–present: I've Tried Everything but Therapy ===
Teddy Swims performing an acoustic version of "Rivers" by Six60, 2023

Swims first appeared on the Billboard Hot 100 in June 2023 with the release of his single "Lose Control". The single is from his 2023 debut album, I've Tried Everything but Therapy (Part 1).

In 2023, Swims collaborated with Armin van Buuren & Matoma, X Ambassadors, Maren Morris, Meghan Trainor, and Elley Duhé. In March, he announced his I've Tried Everything but Therapy international headline tour, including shows in the UK, Ireland, Australia, Germany, Netherlands, and New Zealand in July and August. He also performed at BottleRock, Bamboozle, Boston Calling, TRNSMT, and Latitude music festivals the same year. Teddy also opened for the rock band Greta Van Fleet on the tour to support their new album Starcatcher.

On December 6, 2023, Swims performed at Avicii Arena for the Together For A Better Day concert. The concert promoted mental health awareness and was sponsored by the Tim Bergling Foundation to honor the memory of the Swedish DJ Avicii. At the concert, Swims performed his song "Lose Control" and Coldplay's "A Sky Full of Stars", which Avicii produced.

In October 2025, Swims performed at the 2025 NRL Grand Final.

In April 2026, Swims performed at Coachella 2026.

== Personal life ==
On January 8, 2025, Swims and his girlfriend, Raiche Wright, announced that they were expecting their first child. On June 27, he announced the birth of their son.

== Discography ==
=== Studio albums ===
- I've Tried Everything but Therapy (Part 1) (2023)
- I've Tried Everything but Therapy (Part 2) (2025)
- Ugly (2027)

== Tours ==
=== Headline ===
- Tough Love World Tour (2022)
- US Fall Tour (2022)
- Summer International Tour (2023)
- I've Tried Everything but Therapy (2023–2025)
- The Ugly Tour (2026)

=== Supporting act ===
- Zac Brown (2021)
- Greta Van Fleet's Starcatcher Tour (2023)

== Awards and nominations ==
Year	Award	Category	Work	Result	Ref.
2024	MTV Video Music Awards	Song of the Year	"Lose Control"	Nominated	
2024	MTV Video Music Awards	Best New Artist	Himself	Nominated	
2024	MTV Video Music Awards	Push Performance of the Year	Himself	Nominated	
2024	MTV Video Music Awards	Best Alternative	"Lose Control" (Live)	Nominated	
2024	MTV Europe Music Awards	Best New	Himself	Nominated	
2024	MTV Europe Music Awards	Best Push	Himself	Nominated	
2024	Nickelodeon Kids' Choice Awards	Favorite Breakout Artist	Himself	Nominated	
2024	NRJ Music Awards	International Revelation of the Year	Himself	Nominated	
2024	NRJ Music Awards	International Hit of the Year	"Lose Control"	Nominated	
2024	NRJ Music Awards	Most Radio Airplay in France	"Lose Control"	Won	
2024	Los 40 Music Awards	Best International Song	"Lose Control"	Nominated	
2024	Los 40 Music Awards	Best International Album	I've Tried Everything but Therapy (Part 1)	Won	
2024	Los 40 Music Awards	Best International Act	Himself	Won	
2024	Los 40 Music Awards	Best International Live Act	Himself	Nominated	
2024	Billboard Music Awards	Top New Artist	Himself	Nominated	
2024	Billboard Music Awards	Top Song Sales Artist	Himself	Nominated	
2024	Billboard Music Awards	Top Hot 100 Song	"Lose Control"	Won	
2024	Billboard Music Awards	Top Streaming Song	"Lose Control"	Nominated	
2024	Billboard Music Awards	Top Radio Song	"Lose Control"	Won	
2024	Billboard Music Awards	Top Selling Song	"Lose Control"	Nominated	
2024	Billboard Music Awards	Top Billboard Global 200 Song	"Lose Control"	Nominated	
2024	Billboard Music Awards	Top Billboard Global (Excl. U.S.) Song	"Lose Control"	Nominated	
2025	Grammy Awards	Best New Artist	Himself	Nominated	
2025	Brit Awards	International Song of the Year	"Lose Control"	Nominated	
2025	American Music Awards	Song of the Year	"Lose Control"	Nominated	
2025	American Music Awards	Favorite Pop Song	"Lose Control"	Nominated	
2025	American Music Awards	New Artist of the Year	Himself	Nominated	
2025	American Music Awards	Favorite Male Pop Artist	Himself	Nominated	
2025	Swiss Music Awards	Best International Breaking Act	Himself	Nominated	
2025	Swiss Music Awards	Best International Hit	"Lose Control"	Nominated	
2025	Los 40 Music Awards	Best International Song	"The Door"	Nominated	
2026	Grammy Awards	Best Pop Vocal Album	I've Tried Everything but Therapy (Part 2)	Nominated	
2026	Hungarian Music Awards	Foreign Modern Pop-Rock Album or Recording of the Year	I've Tried Everything but Therapy (Part 2)	Won	
2026	Hungarian Music Awards	Foreign Electronic Music Album or Recording of the Year	"Gone Gone Gone" (with David Guetta and Tones and I)	Nominated	
2026	American Music Awards	Collaboration of the Year	"Gone Gone Gone" (with David Guetta and Tones and I)	Nominated	
2026	NRJ Music Awards	International Male Artist of the Year	Himself	Nominated	
