= Niall Horan discography =

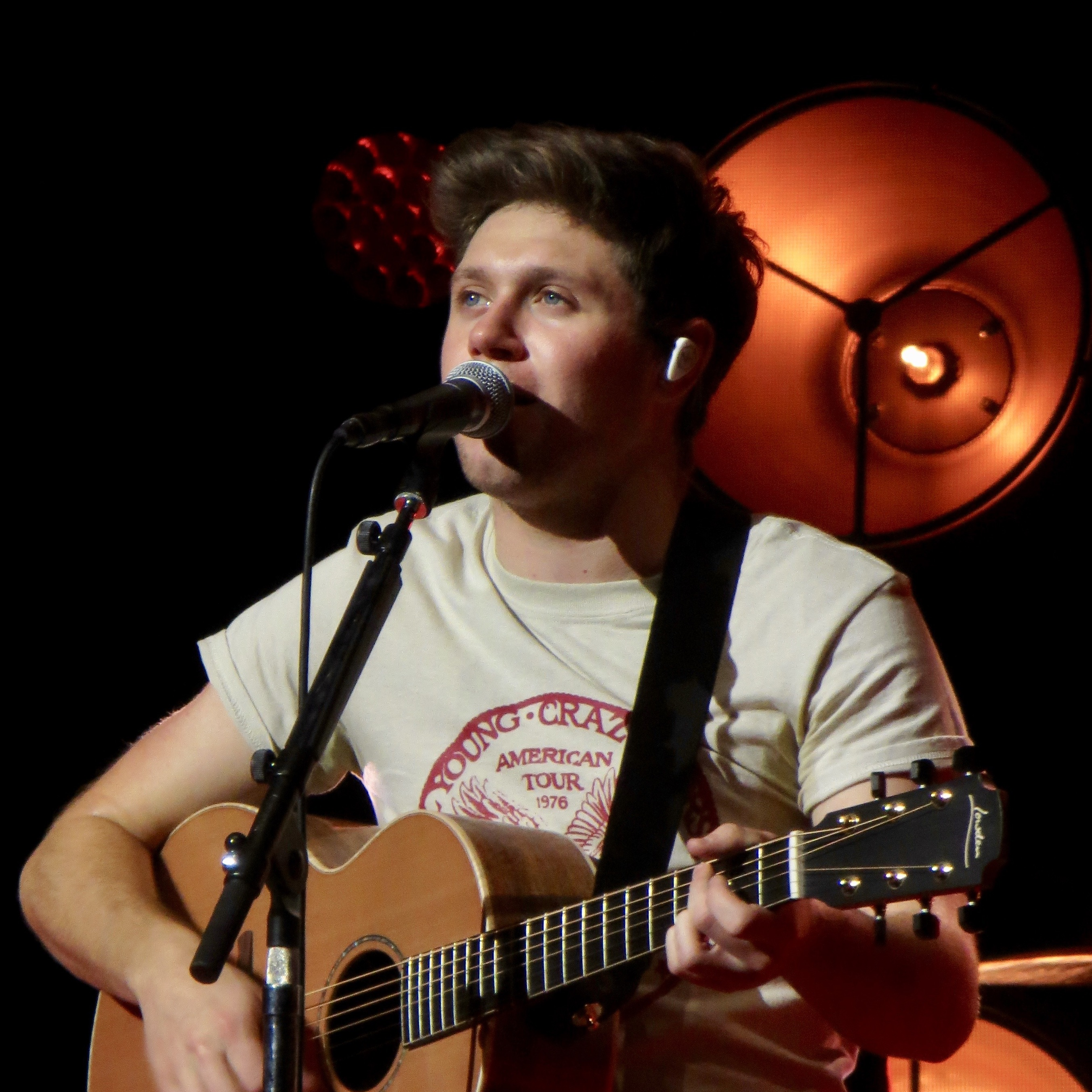
- Horan performing in 2018
- Studio albums: 4
- EPs: 3
- Live albums: 4
- Singles: 19
- Music videos: 16
- Promotional singles: 1

As a solo artist, Irish singer-songwriter Niall Horan has released four studio albums, four live albums, three extended plays, nineteen singles (including two as featured artist), one promotional single and sixteen music videos.

Horan rose to prominence as a member of the boy band One Direction, formed in 2010 on the singing competition The X Factor. The group released five albums and went on to become one of the best-selling boy bands of all time. After the band declared a hiatus in 2016, it was announced In September 2016 that Horan had signed a solo deal with Capitol Records. Later that month, Horan released his debut solo single "This Town". Since its release, it has peaked at number 9 on the UK Singles Chart, and number 20 on the US Billboard Hot 100. On 4 May 2017, Horan released his second solo single "Slow Hands". It also entered the top 10 in the UK and the top 20 in the US. Horan's debut album, Flicker, was released on 20 October 2017 under licence by Capitol Records.

His second studio album, Heartbreak Weather, released on 13 March 2020, generated four singles—"Nice to Meet Ya", "Put a Little Love on Me", "No Judgement" and "Black and White"—and debuted at number one on the UK Albums Chart. Horan's third studio album, The Show, was released on 9 June 2023, and was preceded by singles "Heaven" and "Meltdown". According to Recording Industry Association of America, Horan has sold 6.5 million albums and singles in the United States. He was also included on Billboard's Annual Year-end Top Artists of 2017, placing at number 29. His fourth studio album, Dinner Party, was released on 5 June 2026.

== Albums ==
=== Studio albums ===
List of studio albums, with selected release details, chart positions, sales figures and certifications
Title	Details	Peak chart positions										Sales	Certifications
Title	Details	IRE	AUS	AUT	CAN	DEN	GER	NZ	SWE	UK	US	Sales	Certifications
Flicker	Released: 20 October 2017; Label: Capitol; Format: LP, CD, CD/DVD, digital download, cassette, streaming	1	2	6	1	4	8	3	5	3	1	US: 152,000; CAN: 16,000	IRMA: 2× Platinum; ARIA: Platinum; BPI: Gold; GLF: Gold; IFPI AUT: Gold; IFPI DEN: Platinum; MC: 3× Platinum; RIAA: Platinum
Heartbreak Weather	Released: 13 March 2020; Label: Capitol; Format: LP, CD, digital download, streaming	1	2	3	6	14	4	4	21	1	4	US: 60,700	BPI: Gold; IFPI DEN: Gold; MC: Platinum
The Show	Released: 9 June 2023; Label: Capitol; Format: LP, CD, digital download, streaming	1	1	4	5	8	2	1	8	1	2	US: 68,000	BPI: Silver
Dinner Party	Released: 5 June 2026; Label: Capitol, UMG, Neon Haze; Formats: LP, CD, cassette, digital download, streaming	1	1	2	12	7	1	6	40	1	7		

=== Live albums ===
List of live albums, with selected details and chart positions
Title	Details	Peak chart positions		
Title	Details	IRE	AUS	UK
Flicker: Featuring the RTÉ Concert Orchestra	Released: 7 December 2018; Label: Virgin EMI, Capitol; Format: CD, digital download, streaming	12	— (Note: Flicker: Featuring the RTÉ Concert Orchestra did not enter the ARIA Albums Chart, but peaked at number 40 on the ARIA Digital Album Chart.)	—
Live from Spotify Studios	Released: 13 February 2024; Label: Capitol; Format: LP, streaming	—	—	—
The Show: Live from Madison Square Garden	Released: 30 August 2024; Label: Capitol; Format: LP, digital download, streaming	40	93	79
The Show: Live on Tour	Released: 6 September 2024; Label: Capitol; Format: CD, LP, digital download, streaming	40	93	79

== Extended plays ==
List of extended plays, with selected details and notes
Title	Details	Notes
Spotify Singles (Note: A live EP recorded exclusively for Spotify.)	Released: 13 December 2017; Label: Capitol; Format: Streaming	Track listing: | No. | Title | Length | |---|---|---| | 1. | "Too Much to Ask" | 3:37 | | 2. | "Fool's Gold" | 3:24 | | Total length: | | 7:01 |
Mirrors (Note: Record Store Day 2018 release)	Released: 21 April 2018; Label: Capitol; Format: Vinyl	Track listing: | No. | Title | Length | |---|---|---| | 1. | "On My Own" | 4:00 | | 2. | "Mirrors" | 3:38 | | 3. | "On the Loose" | 3:43 | | 4. | "Slow Hands" | 3:07 | | Total length: | | 14:28 |
Spotify Singles (Note: A live EP recorded exclusively for Spotify.)	Released: 4 March 2020; Label: Capitol; Format: Streaming	Track listing: | No. | Title | Length | |---|---|---| | 1. | "No Judgement" | 3:11 | | 2. | "Lover" (with Fletcher) | 3:59 | | Total length: | | 7:10 |

=== Streaming-only compilations ===
List of extended plays, with selected details
Title	Details
Niall's Mix	Released: 26 March 2021; Label: Capitol
Hello Lovers Mix	Released: 16 December 2022; Label: Capitol
Hidden Gems	Released: 13 January 2023; Label: Capitol

== Singles ==
=== As lead artist ===
List of singles as lead artist, with year released, selected chart positions, certifications, and album details shown
Title	Year	Peak chart positions										Certifications	Album
Title	Year	IRE	AUS	AUT	CAN	NLD	NZ	SWE	SWI	UK	US	Certifications	Album
"This Town"	2016	6	5	24	27	12	24	18	40	9	20	ARIA: 6× Platinum; BPI: 2× Platinum; GLF: Platinum; IFPI AUT: Platinum; MC: 2× Platinum; RIAA: 4× Platinum; RMNZ: 3× Platinum	Flicker
"Slow Hands"	2017	3	2	26	8	13	8	40	47	7	11	ARIA: 9× Platinum; BPI: 2× Platinum; GLF: Gold; IFPI AUT: Gold; MC: Diamond; RIAA: 3× Platinum; RMNZ: 5× Platinum	Flicker
"Too Much to Ask"	2017	6	19	29	41	12	— (Note: "Too Much to Ask" did not enter the NZ Top 40 Singles Chart, but peaked at number one on the NZ Heatseeker Singles Chart.)	34	37	24	66	ARIA: 3× Platinum; BPI: Gold; MC: Platinum; RIAA: Gold; RMNZ: Platinum	Flicker
"On the Loose"	2018	47	—	—	—	35	— (Note: "On the Loose" did not enter the NZ Top 40 Singles Chart, but peaked at number three on the NZ Heatseeker Singles Chart.)	— (Note: "On the Loose" did not enter the Swedish Singles Chart, but peaked at number fourteen on the Swedish Heatseeker Singles Chart.)	—	94	—		Flicker
"Seeing Blind" (with Maren Morris)	2018	68	—	—	—	—	—	—	—	—	—	RMNZ: Gold	Flicker
"Nice to Meet Ya"	2019	7	60	—	55	25	— (Note: "Nice to Meet Ya" did not enter the NZ Top 40 Singles Chart, but peaked at number nine on the NZ Hot Singles Chart.)	— (Note: "Nice to Meet Ya" did not enter the Swedish Singellista Chart, but peaked at number 20 on the Swedish Heatseeker Chart.)	95	22	63	BPI: Platinum; IFPI AUT: Gold; MC: Platinum; RMNZ: Platinum	Heartbreak Weather
"Put a Little Love on Me"	2019	28	—	—	— (Note: "Put a Little Love on Me" did not enter the Canadian Hot 100, but peaked at number 28 on the Canadian Digital Singles Chart.)	— (Note: "Put a Little Love on Me" did not enter the Dutch Top 40, but peaked at number 18 on the Tiparade chart.)	— (Note: "Put a Little Love on Me" did not enter the NZ Top 40 Singles Chart, but peaked at number 15 on the NZ Hot Singles Chart.)	—	—	—	— (Note: "Put a Little Love on Me" did not enter Billboard Hot 100, but peaked at number 9 on the Billboard Digital Song Sales Chart.)	BPI: Silver; MC: Gold; RMNZ: Gold	Heartbreak Weather
"No Judgement"	2020	6	—	—	100	28	— (Note: "No Judgement" did not enter the NZ Top 40 Singles Chart, but peaked at number 11 on the NZ Hot Singles Chart.)	—	—	32	97	BPI: Silver; MC: Gold; RMNZ: Gold	Heartbreak Weather
"Black and White"	2020	18	—	—	—	— (Note: "Black and White" did not enter the Dutch Top 40, but peaked at number 20 on the Tiparade chart.)	— (Note: "Black and White" did not enter the NZ Top 40 Singles Chart, but peaked at number 10 on the NZ Hot Singles Chart.)	—	—	91	—	BPI: Silver; MC: Gold; RMNZ: Gold	Heartbreak Weather
"Our Song" (with Anne-Marie)	2021	7	—	—	— (Note: "Our Song" did not enter the Canadian Hot 100, but peaked at number 28 on the Canadian Digital Singles Chart.)	32	— (Note: "Our Song" did not enter the NZ Top 40 Singles Chart, but peaked at number eight on the NZ Hot Singles Chart.)	— (Note: "Our Song" did not enter the Swedish Singellista Chart, but peaked at number six on the Swedish Heatseeker Chart.)	—	13	—	BPI: Platinum; MC: Platinum; RMNZ: Platinum	Therapy
"Everywhere" (with Anne-Marie)	2021	49	88	—	—	— (Note: "Everywhere" did not enter the Dutch Top 40, but peaked at number 23 on the Tiparade chart.)	— (Note: "Everywhere" did not enter the NZ Top 40 Singles Chart, but peaked at number 14 on the NZ Hot Singles Chart.)	—	—	23	—		Non-album single
"Heaven"	2023	4	30	47	31	8	34	54	69	16	62	BPI: Gold; ARIA: Platinum; MC: Gold; RMNZ: Gold	The Show
"Meltdown"	2023	15	—	—	—	— (Note: "Meltdown" did not enter the Dutch Top 40, but peaked at number one on the Tiparade chart.)	— (Note: "Meltdown" did not enter the NZ Top 40 Singles Chart, but peaked at number one on the NZ Hot Singles Chart.)	—	—	62	—		The Show
"You Could Start a Cult" (solo or encore version with Lizzy McAlpine)	2023	—	—	—	—	—	— (Note: "You Could Start a Cult" did not enter the NZ Top 40 Singles Chart, but peaked at number 22 on the NZ Hot Singles Chart.)	—	—	—	—		The Show
"Drive Safe" (with Myles Smith)	2026	29	94	—	94	11	— (Note: "Drive Safe" did not enter the NZ Top 40 Singles Chart, but peaked at number 10 on the NZ Hot Singles Chart.)	— (Note: "Drive Safe" did not enter the Swedish Singellista Chart, but peaked at number 11 on the Swedish Heatseeker Chart.)	—	27	—	BPI: Silver	My Mess, My Heart, My Life.
"Dinner Party"	2026	36	—	—	89	—	— (Note: "Dinner Party" did not enter the NZ Top 40 Singles Chart, but peaked at number 14 on the NZ Hot Singles Chart.)	—	—	72	—		Dinner Party
"Little More Time"	2026	— (Note: "Little More Time" did not enter the Irish Singles Chart, but peaked at number five on the Irish Homegrown chart.)	—	—	—	—	—	—	—	—	—		Dinner Party
"End of an Era"	2026	—	—	—	—	—	—	—	—	—	—		Dinner Party
"Baby Now That I Found You" (with Ella Bright)	2026	—	—	—	—	—	— (Note: "Baby Now That I Found You" did not enter the NZ Top 40 Singles Chart, but peaked at number 30 on the NZ Hot Singles Chart.)	—	—	—	—		Off Campus (Original Soundtrack)
"—" denotes a recording that did not chart or was not released in that territory.

=== As featured artist ===
List of singles as featured artist, with year released, selected chart positions, certifications and album details shown
Title	Year	Peak chart positions					Certifications	Album
Title	Year	IRE	AUS	NZ Hot	CAN	US	Certifications	Album
"What a Time" (Julia Michaels featuring Niall Horan)	2019	26	100	23	95	—	BPI: Platinum; MC: Platinum; RIAA: 2× Platinum; RMNZ: 2× Platinum	Inner Monologue Part 1
"Moral of the Story" (Ashe featuring Niall Horan)	2020	—	—	19	—	71		Ashlyn
"—" denotes a recording that did not chart or was not released in that territory.

=== Promotional singles ===
List of promotional singles, with year released, selected chart positions and album details shown
Title	Year	Peak chart positions	Album
Title	Year	MEX Ing.	Album
"Finally Free"	2018	39	Smallfoot

== Other charted and certified songs ==
List of other charted songs, showing year released, with selected chart positions, certifications and album name
Title	Year	Peak chart positions							Certifications	Album
Title	Year	IRE	FRA	NLD	NZ Hot	POR	US Adult Pop	US Pop	Certifications	Album
"Flicker"	2017	55	168	23	—	86	—	—	ARIA: Gold	Flicker
"Paper Houses"	2017	83	—	—	—	—	—	—		Flicker
"Since We're Alone"	2017	95	—	—	—	—	—	—		Flicker
"On My Own"	2017	99	—	—	—	—	—	—		Flicker
"Heartbreak Weather"	2020	—	—	—	21	—	—	—		Heartbreak Weather
"Small Talk"	2020	—	—	—	32	—	—	—		Heartbreak Weather
"If You Leave Me"	2023	—	—	—	13	—	—	—		The Show
"Never Grow Up"	2023	—	—	—	15	—	—	—		The Show
"The Show"	2023	38	—	—	6	—	—	—		The Show
"Science"	2023	—	—	—	17	—	—	—		The Show
"Tastes So Good"	2026	— (Note: "Tastes So Good" did not enter the Irish Singles Chart, but peaked at number five on the Irish Homegrown chart.)	—	—	18	—	20	22		Dinner Party
"Monochromatic"	2026	—	—	—	34	—	—	—		Dinner Party
"—" denotes a recording that did not chart or was not released.

== Music videos ==
List of music videos, showing year released and directors
Title	Year	Director(s)	Ref.
As lead artist
"Slow Hands" (Lyric video)	2017	Unknown	
"Too Much to Ask"	2017	Malia James	
"Too Much to Ask" (Alternate version)	2017	Malia James	
"On the Loose"	2018	Jake Jelicich	
"Finally Free"	2018	Unknown	
"Nice to Meet Ya"	2019	The Young Astronauts	
"Nice to Meet Ya" (Alternate video)	2019	Unknown	
"Put a Little Love on Me"	2019	Cameron Busby	
"No Judgement"	2020	Drew Kirsch	
"Heartbreak Weather"	2020	Unknown	
"Black and White"	2020	Unknown	
"Our Song" (with Anne-Marie)	2021	Michael Holyk	
"Everywhere" (with Anne-Marie)	2021	Phill Deacon	
"Heaven"	2023	Dylan Knight	
"The Show"	2023	Connor Brashier	
As featured artist
"What a Time" (Julia Michaels featuring Niall Horan)	2019	Boni Mata	

== See also ==
- One Direction discography
