= The Show: Live on Tour =

2024 concert tour by Niall Horan

- Tour by Niall Horan
- Location: Asia; Europe; Oceania; North America; South America
- Associated album: The Show
- Start date: 20 February 2024
- End date: 9 October 2024
- No. of shows: 86
- Supporting acts: Birdy; Elle Coves; Del Water Gap; Tommy Lefroy; Amy Michelle; Gina Miles; Ryley Tate Wilson
- Attendance: 1.04 million
- Box office: 68,944,582 (Note: Based on 85 out of 87 reported shows.)

Niall Horan concert chronology
- Flicker World Tour (2018); The Show: Live on Tour (2024); Dinner Party: Live on Tour (2026–2027)

The Show: Live on Tour was the third concert tour by Irish singer-songwriter Niall Horan which supported his third studio album, The Show (2023). The tour began on 20 February 2024 in Belfast, Northern Ireland, and concluded on 9 October 2024 in Bogotá, Colombia.

== Background ==
On 22 May 2023, Horan announced a tour to support his third studio album, The Show (2023), with dates across Europe, Oceania and North America. On 1 June 2023, additional dates were announced. On 1 September 2023, additional European dates were announced. Tour dates for Asia and additional shows in the United States were announced on 12 October 2023. Tommy Lefroy supported Horan as the musical opener for the European concerts; Amy Michelle joined for Horan's three-night stay at 3Arena in Dublin. In April 2024, it was announced Birdy would serve as musical opener in Australia.

In April 2024, Del Water Gap was announced as the opener for North American concerts. In May, Ryley Tate Wilson was announced as an opener for two concerts during the North American leg. In June, Horan announced that Del Water Gap would also be the opener for the second UK and Ireland leg. In July, Gina Miles was announced as an opener for two concerts during the North American leg. In August, Elle Coves was announced as an opener for the August 2024 shows in Dublin.

== Live albums ==
The Show: Live from Madison Square Garden

Live album by Niall Horan
- Released: 30 August 2024
- Recorded: 13–14 June 2024
- Venues: Madison Square Garden (New York City, US)
- Length: 39:28
- Label: Capitol
- Producers: Jake Curran; Robert Derbyshire

Niall Horan chronology
Live from Spotify Studios (2024)	The Show: Live from Madison Square Garden (2024)	The Show: Live on Tour (2024)

The Show: Live on Tour

Live album by Niall Horan
- Released: 6 September 2024
- Recorded: February – June 2024
- Venues: Madison Square Garden (New York City, US); Atlas Arena (Łódź, Poland); MidFlorida Credit Union Amphitheatre (Tampa, US); 3Arena (Dublin, Ireland); Tokyo Garden Theater (Tokyo, Japan); Rod Laver Arena (Melbourne, Australia); Mediolanum Forum (Milan, Italy); Oslo Spektrum (Oslo, Norway); PSD Bank Dome (Düsseldorf, Germany); Zénith Paris (Paris, France); OVO Arena Wembley (London, England)
- Length: 76:31
- Label: Capitol
- Producers: Jake Curran; Robert Derbyshire

Niall Horan chronology
The Show: Live from Madison Square Garden (2024)	The Show: Live on Tour (2024)	Dinner Party (2026)

A number of performances were recorded from various tour dates and locations, resulting in two live albums of the concert tour, both announced on 21 August 2024. The Show: Live on Tour, released digitally on 6 September 2024, consists of 10 tracks recorded at the Madison Square Garden shows, followed by 10 additional tracks, each recorded in a different location. The first 10 tracks were released digitally, as The Show: Live from Madison Square Garden, one week earlier. Both The Show: Live from Madison Square Garden and The Show: Live on Tour were released on vinyl on 13 December 2024, with the latter also receiving a CD release on the same day. The release for the physical formats was initially planned for 22 November 2024.

The Show: Live on Tour track listing
No.	Title	Length
1.	"Heaven" (live from Madison Square Garden)	4:54
2.	"Small Talk" (live from Madison Square Garden)	4:14
3.	"On a Night like Tonight" (live from Madison Square Garden)	3:39
4.	"Still" (live from Madison Square Garden)	4:19
5.	"This Town" (live from Madison Square Garden)	4:43
6.	"San Francisco" (live from Madison Square Garden)	3:21
7.	"If You Leave Me" (live from Madison Square Garden)	3:09
8.	"Science" (live from Madison Square Garden)	2:58
9.	"Black and White" (live from Madison Square Garden)	3:38
10.	"Slow Hands" (live from Madison Square Garden)	4:28
11.	"Nice to Meet Ya" (live from Łódź)	4:39
12.	"Save My Life" (live from Tampa)	3:14
13.	"Heartbreak Weather" (live from Dublin)	3:34
14.	"You Could Start a Cult" (live from Tokyo)	3:01
15.	"Dear Patience" (live from Melbourne)	4:04
16.	"Cross Your Mind" (live from Milan)	3:46
17.	"Paper Houses" (live from Oslo)	3:44
18.	"On the Loose" (live from Düsseldorf)	3:10
19.	"Put a Little Love on Me" (live from Paris)	4:01
20.	"Flicker" (live from London)	4:37

=== Charts ===
Chart performance for The Show: Live on Tour
Chart (2024)	Peak position
Australian Albums (ARIA)	93
Belgian Albums (Ultratop Flanders)	14
Belgian Albums (Ultratop Wallonia)	167
Dutch Albums (Album Top 100)	7
Irish Albums (Official Charts)	40
UK Albums (Official Charts)	79
US Top Album Sales (Billboard)	42

== Set list ==
This set list is from the 20 February 2024 concert in Belfast. It may not represent all concerts for the tour.

1. "Nice to Meet Ya"
2. "On a Night Like Tonight"
3. "On the Loose"
4. "Small Talk" / "Edge of Seventeen"
5. "The Show"
6. "Since We're Alone"
7. "If You Leave Me"
8. "Black and White"
9. "Flicker"
10. "This Town"
11. "You Could Start a Cult"
12. "Heaven"
13. "Everywhere"
14. "Night Changes"
15. "Fire Away"
16. "Meltdown"
17. "Mirrors"
18. "Still"

Encore

19. "Save My Life"
20. "Slow Hands"

=== Alterations ===
- During the 23 February 2024 concert in Dublin, Horan covered "Outnumbered" with Dermot Kennedy, and performed "Science".
- During the 1 March 2024 concert in London, Horan covered "Treat You Better" with Shawn Mendes after "Flicker". "Stockholm Syndrome" was also performed in place of "Night Changes".
- During the 1 May 2024 concert in Sydney, Horan covered "Big Jet Plane" with Angus and Julia Stone, and performed "Science".
- During the 3 May and 4 May 2024 concerts in Melbourne, Horan sang "Paper Houses" and "Stockholm Syndrome".
- During the 31 May 2024 concert in Tampa, Horan sang "Seeing Blind" in place of "Since We're Alone", "Save My Life" in place of "If You Leave Me", and "Heartbreak Weather" in place of "Save My Life". "On a Night Like Tonight" and "Small Talk" also switched places on the set list.
- During the 3 June 2024 concert in Nashville, Horan performed "This Town" with Noah Kahan.
- During the 15 June 2024 concert in Mansfield, Horan performed "Seeing Blind" in place of "Since We're Alone", "Save My Life" in place of "If You Leave Me", "Night Changes" was moved to the eighth song on the set list, "Dear Patience" took place of "Flicker", "If You Leave Me" was moved to the fourteenth song on the set list, "San Francisco" was in place of "Fire Away", and "Heartbreak Weather" was in place of "Save My Life". "Small Talk" was also performed second, "On a Night Like Tonight" was third, and "On the Loose" was performed fourth.
- During the 21 June 2024 concert in Saratoga Springs, Horan performed "Moral of the Story" with Ashe, and "Stockholm Syndrome".
- During the 7 July 2024 concert in St. Paul, Horan performed "San Francisco" and sang "Heartbreak Weather" during the encore set.
- During the 10 July 2024 concert in Clarkston, Horan performed "Stockholm Syndrome", "Must Be Love", and "Paper Houses". "Heartbreak Weather" was performed during the encore set.
- During the 27 July 2024 concert in Inglewood, Lizzy McAlpine joined Horan on stage to sing "You Could Start a Cult", and performed "Stockholm Syndrome".
- During the 28 July 2024 concert in Inglewood, Horan performed "What a Time" with Julia Michaels. "Cross Your Mind" and "Stockholm Syndrome" were performed, and "Heartbreak Weather" was performed during the encore.
- During the 31 July 2024 concert in Phoenix, "Small Talk" / "Edge of Seventeen" was performed second, "On a Night Like Tonight" was third, "On the Loose" was performed fourth, "Seeing Blind" was in place of "Since We're Alone", "Save My Life" was performed in place of "If You Leave Me", "Put a Little Love on Me" was in place of "Flicker", "If You Leave Me" was in place of "Everywhere", and "Stockholm Syndrome" was performed in place of "Night Changes", and "Heartbreak Weather" was performed during the encore".
- During the 23 August 2024 concert in Dublin, Horan performed "Little Things" and "Lego House" with Ed Sheeran.
- During the 27 August 2024 concert in Manchester, Horan performed "Stockholm Syndrome".
- During the 31 August 2024 concert in Aberdeen, "You Could Start a Cult" was performed twice. Horan first performed the solo version, then performed the duet version with a fan, Isla, after reading her sign asking him to sing the Lizzy McAlpine version of the song.

== Tour dates ==
List of concerts
Date (2024)	City	Country	Venue	Opening acts	Attendance	Revenue
20 February	Belfast	Northern Ireland	SSE Arena Belfast	Tommy Lefroy	19,110 / 19,110	$1,239,563
21 February	Belfast	Northern Ireland	SSE Arena Belfast	Tommy Lefroy	19,110 / 19,110	$1,239,563
23 February	Dublin	Ireland	3Arena	Tommy Lefroy; Amy Michelle	38,227 / 38,227	$2,878,008
24 February	Dublin	Ireland	3Arena	Tommy Lefroy; Amy Michelle	38,227 / 38,227	$2,878,008
25 February	Dublin	Ireland	3Arena	Tommy Lefroy; Amy Michelle	38,227 / 38,227	$2,878,008
27 February	Birmingham	England	Resorts World Arena	Tommy Lefroy	12,721 / 13,462	$847,706
28 February	Glasgow	Scotland	OVO Hydro	Tommy Lefroy	13,691 / 13,691	$849,762
1 March	London	England	OVO Arena Wembley	Tommy Lefroy	10,669 / 10,669	$815,514
4 March	Cardiff	Wales	Cardiff International Arena	Tommy Lefroy	6,381 / 6,381	$434,979
5 March	Manchester	England	AO Arena	Tommy Lefroy	14,776 / 14,776	$949,739
7 March	Antwerp	Belgium	Sportpaleis	Tommy Lefroy	16,632 / 17,324	$911,626
8 March	Paris	France	Zénith Paris	Tommy Lefroy	5,629 / 5,629	$317,857
11 March	Berlin	Germany	Mercedes-Benz Arena	Tommy Lefroy	13,510 / 13,510	$781,822
12 March	Copenhagen	Denmark	Royal Arena	Tommy Lefroy	14,236 / 14,883	$932,509
14 March	Oslo	Norway	Oslo Spektrum	Tommy Lefroy	10,080 / 10,080	$751,540
15 March	Stockholm	Sweden	Hovet	Tommy Lefroy	10,993 / 10,993	$783,082
17 March	Prague	Czech Republic	Sportovní hala Fortuna	Tommy Lefroy	9,118 / 11,322	$470,853
18 March	Łódź	Poland	Atlas Arena	Tommy Lefroy	13,864 / 13,991	$717,275
20 March	Munich	Germany	Olympiahalle	Tommy Lefroy	11,530 / 11,530	$682,019
21 March	Milan	Italy	Mediolanum Forum	Tommy Lefroy	9,865 / 9,865	$524,224
23 March	Madrid	Spain	WiZink Center	Tommy Lefroy	14,969 / 15,853	$852,390
26 March	Düsseldorf	Germany	PSD Bank Dome	Tommy Lefroy	11,487 / 11,669	$587,196
27 March	Amsterdam	Netherlands	Ziggo Dome	Tommy Lefroy	29,427 / 29,427	$1,803,237
28 March	Amsterdam	Netherlands	Ziggo Dome	Tommy Lefroy	29,427 / 29,427	$1,803,237
26 April	Auckland	New Zealand	Spark Arena	Birdy	8,259 / 8,548	$500,220
28 April	Brisbane	Australia	Brisbane Entertainment Centre	Birdy	10,825 / 10,825	$836,007
1 May	Sydney	Australia	Qudos Bank Arena	Birdy	14,550 / 14,550	$1,075,639
3 May	Melbourne	Australia	Rod Laver Arena	Birdy	26,093 / 26,093	$2,094,457
4 May	Melbourne	Australia	Rod Laver Arena	Birdy	26,093 / 26,093	$2,094,457
9 May	Singapore		Singapore Indoor Stadium	—N/a	9,023 / 9,023	$1,061,674
11 May	Jakarta	Indonesia	Beach City International Stadium	—N/a	4,049 / 6,930	$422,650
13 May	Pasay	Philippines	SM Mall of Asia Arena	—N/a	9,695 / 10,321	$1,227,250
15 May	Tokyo	Japan	Tokyo Garden Theatre	—N/a	6,091 / 6,625	$701,004
29 May	Hollywood	United States	Hard Rock Live	Del Water Gap	6,080 / 6,080	$607,824
31 May	Tampa	United States	MidFlorida Credit Union Amphitheatre	Del Water Gap	16,158 / 17,269	$862,407
1 June	Alpharetta	United States	Ameris Bank Amphitheatre	Del Water Gap	11,200 / 11,200	$604,960
3 June	Nashville	United States	Bridgestone Arena	Del Water Gap; Ryley Tate Wilson	12,619 / 12,619	$1,065,094
5 June	Charlotte	United States	PNC Music Pavilion	Del Water Gap	8,158 / 17,571	$509,451
7 June	Raleigh	United States	Coastal Credit Union Music Park	Del Water Gap	17,036 / 19,403	$698,471
8 June	Bristow	United States	Jiffy Lube Live	Del Water Gap; Ryley Tate Wilson	18,363 / 21,967	$921,442
11 June	Philadelphia	United States	Mann Center for the Performing Arts	Del Water Gap	11,980 / 11,980	$826,063
13 June	New York City	United States	Madison Square Garden	Del Water Gap	24,070 / 24,070	$2,372,629
14 June	New York City	United States	Madison Square Garden	Del Water Gap	24,070 / 24,070	$2,372,629
15 June	Mansfield	United States	Xfinity Center	Del Water Gap	19,486 / 19,486	$980,723
18 June	Bridgeport	United States	Hartford HealthCare Amphitheater	Del Water Gap	5,739 / 5,739	$572,047
19 June	Bangor	United States	Maine Savings Amphitheater	Del Water Gap	8,055 / 12,675	$595,681
21 June	Saratoga Springs	United States	Saratoga Performing Arts Center	Del Water Gap	12,313 / 24,584	$589,202
22 June	Darien	United States	Darien Lake Amphitheatre	Del Water Gap	10,906 / 10,906	$608,034
25 June	Cincinnati	United States	Riverbend Music Center	Del Water Gap	14,911 / 19,824	$663,989
26 June	Cuyahoga Falls	United States	Blossom Music Center	Del Water Gap	13,975 / 18,775	$659,804
28 June	Toronto	Canada	Scotiabank Arena	Del Water Gap	26,352 / 26,352	$1,413,632
29 June	Toronto	Canada	Scotiabank Arena	Del Water Gap	26,352 / 26,352	$1,413,632
7 July	Saint Paul	United States	Xcel Energy Center	Del Water Gap	14,006 / 14,006	$1,233,269
9 July	Tinley Park	United States	Credit Union 1 Amphitheatre	Del Water Gap; Gina Miles	20,415 / 20,415	$1,066,102
10 July	Clarkston	United States	Pine Knob Music Theatre	Del Water Gap	14,540 / 14,540	$696,450
12 July	Maryland Heights	United States	Hollywood Casino Amphitheatre	Del Water Gap	12,335 / 12,335	$660,646
13 July	Noblesville	United States	Ruoff Music Centre	Del Water Gap	12,809 / 12,809	$611,935
16 July	Kansas City	United States	Starlight Theatre	Del Water Gap	7,026 / 7,026	$500,537
17 July	Rogers	United States	Walmart AMP	Del Water Gap	10,376 / 10,376	$542,014
19 July	Denver	United States	Ball Arena	Del Water Gap	11,227 / 11,227	$1,047,586
20 July	West Valley City	United States	USANA Amphitheatre	Del Water Gap	19,722 / 19,722	$840,693
23 July	Auburn	United States	White River Amphitheatre	Del Water Gap	11,597 / 15,372	$699,777
24 July	Ridgefield	United States	RV Inn Style Resorts Amphitheater	Del Water Gap	9,315 / 9,315	$523,912
26 July	Mountain View	United States	Shoreline Amphitheatre	Del Water Gap; Gina Miles	17,811 / 17,811	$778,179
27 July	Inglewood	United States	Kia Forum	Del Water Gap	24,910 / 24,910	$2,359,958
28 July	Inglewood	United States	Kia Forum	Del Water Gap	24,910 / 24,910	$2,359,958
30 July	Chula Vista	United States	North Island Credit Union Amphitheatre	Del Water Gap	11,797 / 18,833	$710,362
31 July	Phoenix	United States	Talking Stick Resort Amphitheatre	Del Water Gap	11,783 / 11,783	$642,774
2 August	Dallas	United States	Dos Equis Pavilion	Del Water Gap	13,588 / 13,588	$716,239
3 August	Austin	United States	Moody Center	Del Water Gap	10,987 / 10,987	$985,113
23 August	Dublin	Ireland	Royal Hospital Kilmainham	Elle Coves; Del Water Gap	33,852 / 33,852	$2,534,089
24 August	Dublin	Ireland	Royal Hospital Kilmainham	Elle Coves; Del Water Gap	33,852 / 33,852	$2,534,089
27 August	Manchester	England	Co-op Live	Del Water Gap	17,233 / 17,233	$1,173,876
28 August	Leeds	England	First Direct Arena	Del Water Gap	11,404 / 12,136	$739,703
30 August	Newcastle	England	Utilita Arena	Del Water Gap	10,089 / 10,787	$676,160
31 August	Aberdeen	Scotland	P&J Live	Del Water Gap	9,851 / 9,851	$649,378
3 September	London	England	The O_{2} Arena	Del Water Gap	17,641 / 17,641	$1,252,088
20 September	Mexico City	Mexico	Palacio de los Deportes	—N/a	36,254 / 36,254	$2,159,529
21 September	Mexico City	Mexico	Palacio de los Deportes	—N/a	36,254 / 36,254	$2,159,529
23 September	Guadalajara	Mexico	Arena VFG	—N/a	12,065 / 13,040	$811,264
25 September	Monterrey	Mexico	Arena Monterrey	—N/a	12,260 / 12,260	$1,035,137
28 September	São Paulo	Brazil	Parque Ibirapuera	—N/a	12,494 / 14,395	$897,402
29 September	Rio de Janeiro	Brazil	Jeunesse Arena	—N/a	5,657 / 7,113	$351,446
2 October	Buenos Aires	Argentina	Movistar Arena	—N/a	—	—
4 October	Santiago	Chile	Movistar Arena	Dindi Jane	6,339 / 7,363	$461,712
6 October	Lima	Peru	Estadio Nacional	—N/a	—	—
9 October	Bogotá	Colombia	Movistar Arena	—N/a	14,112 / 14,112	$985,997
Total					1,046,396 / 1,116,899 (93.69%)	$68,944,582 (85 / 87 shows reported)

== Personnel ==
Listed from his shows at Madison Square Garden.

- Niall Horan – lead vocals, piano, guitar
- John Bird – bass
- Jake Curran – strings
- Emily Kohavi – strings, violin
- Dani McGinley – keys
- Alex Torjussen – drums
- Louis Querelle – keys
