= Carpool Karaoke =

Segment on The Late Late Show with James Corden

Carpool Karaoke is a recurring segment on The Late Late Show with James Corden, in which host James Corden invites famous musical guests to sing along to their songs with him while traveling in a car ostensibly driven by Corden on a planned route usually in Los Angeles, usually under the pretense of needing to get to work and preferring to use the high-occupancy carpool vehicle lane, or the pretext of needing directions from a local when in a new town, such as London (with Adele), Liverpool (with Paul McCartney), New York City (with Madonna) or Las Vegas (with Celine Dion).

In 2016, Apple Music and CBS Television Studios announced that they had reached a deal for an exclusive first-window licensing agreement under which Apple Music will be the global home of a television series adaptation of the segment. It was also initially announced that the series would have a host that would appear in every episode. On January 9, 2017, it was reported that the series would not feature a single host and instead would have a different host in every episode.

== Origin ==
The format was created in 2009 by Robert Llewelyn in his podcast series Carpool. Corden argues the segment was inspired by a Gavin & Stacey-themed sketch he had participated in for the British charity television special Red Nose Day 2011, in which he sang along with George Michael in a car.

For the 2014 documentary When Corden Met Barlow which aired on BBC One, Corden included a 6-minute 45 second Carpool Karaoke segment in the documentary with singer-songwriter Gary Barlow of Take That. The documentary was directed by Ben Winston. Corden explained that "Ben Winston and I always thought there was something very joyful about someone very, very famous singing their songs in an ordinary situation. We just had this idea: Los Angeles, traffic, the carpool lane—maybe this is something we could pull off." No musicians were interested initially, but when Corden showed the George Michael-clip to Mariah Carey, she agreed to pioneer the show.

In 2020, it was revealed that Corden does not always actually drive the vehicle during filming; instead it is towed. Corden explained that due to safety issues—like for a dance routine, or costume change—they have to tow, and cited five instances, roughly five percent of the series to date, where this method was employed: with Meghan Trainor, Migos, Cardi B, Chance the Rapper, and Justin Bieber (3rd time). He also added that the entire endeavor is strictly for entertainment as he is already at work and does not need to carpool, and the streets he drives do not have carpool lanes.

== Guests ==
The segments, which have featured artists such as Paul McCartney, Adele, Migos, Iggy Azalea, Nicki Minaj, Cardi B, Mariah Carey, Celine Dion, Justin Bieber, Madonna, Bruno Mars, Billie Eilish, Foo Fighters, Jonas Brothers, Coldplay, Lady Gaga, Jennifer Lopez, Kanye West, Britney Spears, Stevie Wonder, Demi Lovato, Ariana Grande, Katy Perry, Selena Gomez, BTS, One Direction, Shawn Mendes, Ed Sheeran, Sia, Elton John, Carrie Underwood and Red Hot Chili Peppers, became popular videos on the Late Late Show's YouTube channel. A January 2016 Carpool Karaoke segment featuring Adele amassed 42 million YouTube views within five days, making it the most popular video originating from a late night program since 2013, continuing on to gather 233 million by March 12, 2021. As of March 12, 2021, five other segments have amassed over 100 million views on YouTube: One Direction at 176 million, Justin Bieber's first visit at 155 million views, Sia at 140 million, Bruno Mars at 132 million and Selena Gomez at 110 million. As of March 12, 2021, the most viewed segment featuring a non-musician, then U.S. First Lady Michelle Obama (eventually joined by Missy Elliott for two songs) has amassed over 80 million views.

On March 29, 2016, CBS aired a primetime special featuring highlights of the segment, and a new edition with Jennifer Lopez. The special won a 2016 Emmy Award for Outstanding Variety Special. The Red Hot Chili Peppers appeared on the June 13, 2016 segment. During the filming, singer Anthony Kiedis saved the life of a baby. Kiedis later said, "A woman came out of her house, holding a child, saying, 'My baby, my baby, my baby can't breathe!' We all ran across the street, the woman thrust the baby into my arms, the baby was not breathing and I thought, 'I'm gonna try and do a little baby CPR real quick, see if I can get some air in this kid.' Tried to open the mouth, [it was] like locked shut. So I started rubbing the belly, bubbles came out of the mouth, the eyes rolled back into place, the ambulance showed up and I handed the baby over, who was now breathing and fine, and we went back to Carpool Karaoke."

== List of segments ==
=== 2015 ===
#	Episode	Guest(s)	Date of first broadcast	Songs	Ref.
1	3	Mariah Carey	March 26, 2015	"Always Be My Baby" "Fantasy" "Vision of Love" "Thirsty"	
2	11	Jennifer Hudson	April 13, 2015	"Trouble" "Spotlight" "And I Am Telling You I'm Not Going"	
3	34	Justin Bieber (1)	May 20, 2015	"Baby" "Boyfriend" "Where Are Ü Now" "End of the Road"	
4	46	Iggy Azalea	June 18, 2015	"Fancy" "Black Widow" "Trouble" "Pretty Girls"	
5	48	Rod Stewart (featuring ASAP Rocky)	July 14, 2015	"The First Cut Is the Deepest" "Everyday" "Da Ya Think I'm Sexy?" "Maggie May" "Ooh La La"	
6	75	Stevie Wonder	September 14, 2015	"Superstition" "Sir Duke" "I Just Called to Say I Love You" "Isn't She Lovely" "Signed, Sealed, Delivered I'm Yours" "For Once in My Life"	
7	101	Jason Derulo	November 4, 2015	"Talk Dirty" "Want To Want Me" "Wiggle" "Talk Dirty" (Again)	
8	109	Justin Bieber (2)	November 18, 2015	"Never Say Never" "What Do You Mean?" "Stronger" "Ironic" "Sorry"	
9	116	Carrie Underwood	December 2, 2015	"Smoke Break" "Jesus, Take the Wheel" "Before He Cheats" "Wake Me Up Before You Go-Go"	
10	123	One Direction	December 15, 2015	"What Makes You Beautiful" "Story of My Life" "Best Song Ever" "No Control" "Perfect" "Drag Me Down"	
11	125	Christmas Carpool Karaoke (featuring clips of Carrie Underwood, Stevie Wonder, Justin Bieber, Iggy Azalea, Jason Derulo, Rod Stewart, One Direction, and Reggie Watts)	December 17, 2015	"Joy to the World"	

=== 2016 ===
#	Episode	Guest(s)	Date of first broadcast	Songs	Ref.
12	132	Adele (1)	January 13, 2016	"Hello" "Someone like You" "Wannabe" "All I Ask" "Monster" "Rolling in the Deep"	
13	138	Chris Martin	February 2, 2016	"Adventure of a Lifetime" "Yellow" "Hymn for the Weekend" "Viva la Vida" "Heroes" "Us Against the World" "Paradise"	
14	143	Elton John	February 7, 2016	"Your Song" "I'm Still Standing" "Crocodile Rock" "Tiny Dancer" "Looking Up" "Circle of Life" "Don't Let the Sun Go Down on Me"	
15	147	Sia	February 16, 2016	"Chandelier" "Diamonds" "Elastic Heart" "Alive" "Titanium"	
16	166	Jennifer Lopez	March 29, 2016	"Love Don't Cost a Thing" "Booty" "Jenny from the Block" "Locked Out of Heaven" "Qué Hiciste" "Waiting for Tonight" "On the Floor"	
17	182	Gwen Stefani (eventually joined by George Clooney and Julia Roberts)	May 4, 2016	"Don't Speak" "The Sweet Escape" "Used to Love You" "Rich Girl" "Hollaback Girl" "We Are the Champions"	
18	188	Demi Lovato and Nick Jonas	May 16, 2016	"Heart Attack" "Chains" "Stone Cold" "Cake by the Ocean" "Close" "Jealous" "Confident"	
19	196	Lin-Manuel Miranda (eventually joined by Audra McDonald, Jesse Tyler Ferguson, and Jane Krakowski)	June 6, 2016	"On Broadway" "Alexander Hamilton/Guns and Ships" "Seasons of Love" "Can't Take My Eyes Off You" "One Day More"	
20	199	Red Hot Chili Peppers	June 13, 2016	"Can't Stop" "Give It Away" "Californication" "Dark Necessities" "Under the Bridge" "The Zephyr Song" "By the Way"	
21	203	Selena Gomez	June 20, 2016	"Same Old Love" "Come & Get It" "Hands to Myself" "Kill Em with Kindness" "Love You like a Love Song" "Shake It Off"	
22	209	Michelle Obama (eventually joined by Missy Elliott)	July 20, 2016	"Signed, Sealed, Delivered I'm Yours" "Single Ladies (Put a Ring on It)" "This Is For My Girls" "Get Ur Freak On"	
23	221	Britney Spears	August 25, 2016	"Oops!... I Did It Again" "Womanizer" "Make Me" "Toxic" "...Baby One More Time"	
24	250	Lady Gaga	October 25, 2016	"Perfect Illusion" "Bad Romance" "The Edge of Glory" "Born This Way" "Poker Face" "Million Reasons"	
25	271	Madonna	December 7, 2016	"Vogue" "Bitch I'm Madonna" "Papa Don't Preach" "Don't Cry for Me Argentina" "Express Yourself" "Ray of Light" "Music"	
26	274	Bruno Mars	December 13, 2016	"24K Magic" "Locked Out of Heaven" "Grenade" "Versace on the Floor" "If I Knew" "Uptown Funk" "Perm"	
27	276	'All I Want for Christmas' Carpool Karaoke (featuring clips of Mariah Carey, Adele, Lady Gaga, Elton John, Selena Gomez, Demi Lovato, Nick Jonas, Gwen Stefani, Chris Martin, and Red Hot Chili Peppers)	December 15, 2016	"All I Want for Christmas Is You"	

=== 2017 ===
#	Episode	Guest(s)	Date of first broadcast	Songs	Ref.
28	277	George Michael (from an earlier recording during Red Nose Day 2011); Rebroadcast as part of Corden's tribute segment to Michael	January 3, 2017	"I'm Your Man" "Freedom"	
29	—N/a	Take That (recorded for Red Nose Day 2017)	January 30, 2017	"Shine" "Greatest Day" "Babe" "Giants" "Never Forget" "Back for Good" "It Only Takes a Minute" "Do What U Like" "A Million Love Songs" "Pray"	
30	318	Stephen Curry (part of the Late Late Show's NCAA Championship Special)	April 3, 2017	"How Far I'll Go" "Love Is an Open Door"	
31	340	Harry Styles (1)	May 18, 2017	"Sign of the Times" "Sweet Creature" "Hey Ya!" "Endless Love" "Kiwi"	
32	341	Katy Perry	May 22, 2017	"Firework" "I Kissed a Girl" "Dark Horse" "Bon Appétit" "Swish Swish" "Roar"	
33	346	Ed Sheeran	June 6, 2017	"Shape of You" "Sing" "Thinking Out Loud" "Love Yourself" "What Makes You Beautiful" "Castle on the Hill"	
34	357	Usher	July 25, 2017	"Yeah!" "So Fresh, So Clean" "Burn" "Caught Up" "I Don't Mind" "OMG"	
35	382	Foo Fighters	September 20, 2017	"All My Life" "Best of You" "Learn to Fly" "The Sky Is a Neighborhood" "Never Gonna Give You Up"	
36	393	Miley Cyrus	October 10, 2017	"We Can't Stop" "The Climb" "Party in the U.S.A." "Younger Now" "Wrecking Ball" "Malibu"	
37	402	Sam Smith (eventually joined by Fifth Harmony)	November 1, 2017	"Too Good at Goodbyes" "Lay Me Down" "I'm Not the Only One" "Money on My Mind" "Stay with Me" "Pray" "Work from Home"	
38	409	Pink	November 14, 2017	"What About Us" "Get the Party Started" "Beautiful Trauma" "Raise Your Glass" "Just like a Pill"	
39	415	Kelly Clarkson	November 29, 2017	"Since U Been Gone" "Love So Soft" "Stronger (What Doesn't Kill You)" "Because of You" "Whole Lotta Woman"	
40	421	'Santa Claus Is Comin' To Town' Carpool Karaoke (featuring clips of Reggie Watts, Sam Smith, Fifth Harmony, Harry Styles, Bruno Mars, Pink, Kelly Clarkson, Foo Fighters, Katy Perry, Miley Cyrus, Usher, and Ed Sheeran)	December 11, 2017	"Santa Claus Is Comin' to Town"	

=== 2018 ===
#	Episode	Guest(s)	Date of first broadcast	Songs	Ref.
41	471	Christina Aguilera (eventually joined by Melissa McCarthy)	April 23, 2018	"Fighter" "Dirrty" "Genie in a Bottle" "Beautiful"	
41	485	Christina Aguilera	May 16, 2018	"Fall in Line"	
42	490	Adam Levine	May 24, 2018	"Moves like Jagger" "This Love" "She Will Be Loved" "Sugar" "Wait"	
43	491	Shawn Mendes	June 4, 2018	"There's Nothing Holdin' Me Back" "In My Blood" "Mercy" "Treat You Better" "Lost in Japan"	
44	502	Paul McCartney	June 21, 2018	"Drive My Car" "Penny Lane" "Let It Be" "When I'm Sixty-Four" "Blackbird" "Come On to Me" "A Hard Day's Night" "Ob-La-Di, Ob-La-Da" "Love Me Do" "Back in the U.S.S.R." "Hey Jude"	
45	516	Ariana Grande	August 16, 2018	"Dangerous Woman" "Side to Side" "God Is a Woman" "No Tears Left to Cry" "Suddenly Seymour"	
46	—N/a	Michael Bublé (recorded for Stand Up to Cancer UK)	October 26, 2018	"Haven't Met You Yet" "Everything" "It's a Beautiful Day" "Love You Anymore" "Home"	
47	548	Barbra Streisand	November 1, 2018	"No More Tears (Enough Is Enough)" "The Way We Were" "Imagine / What a Wonderful World" "Don't Lie to Me" "Don't Rain on My Parade"	
48	553	Migos	November 13, 2018	"Walk It Talk It" "I Wanna Dance with Somebody (Who Loves Me)" "Bad and Boujee" "MotorSport" "Sweet Caroline"	
49	569	Cardi B	December 17, 2018	"Bodak Yellow" "Money" "Drip" "Bartier Cardi" "Be Careful" "I Like It"	
50	572	'Christmas (Baby Please Come Home)' Carpool Karaoke (featuring clips of Michael Bublé, Cardi B, Paul McCartney, Shawn Mendes, Barbra Streisand, Migos, Adam Levine, Christina Aguilera, and Ariana Grande)	December 20, 2018	"Christmas (Baby Please Come Home)"	

=== 2019 ===
#	Episode	Guest(s)	Date of first broadcast	Songs	Ref.
51	603	Jonas Brothers	March 7, 2019	"Burnin' Up" "Year 3000" "Sucker" "When You Look Me in the Eyes" "Lovebug"	
52	Special	Celine Dion	May 20, 2019	"I'm So Excited" "Work" "On the Radio" "It's All Coming Back to Me Now" "Baby Shark" "Because You Loved Me" "I Drove All Night" "Lying Down" "My Heart Will Go On" "All by Myself" (bonus)	
53	685	Chance the Rapper	October 9, 2019	"All Day Long" "No Problem" "Cross Me" "Hot Shower" "All Night"	
54	691	Kanye West (episode retitled Airpool Karaoke)	October 28, 2019	"Every Hour" "Back to Life" "Jesus Walks" "Souls Anchored" "Through the Fire" "I'm Like a Bird" "Selah"	
55	713	Harry Styles (2)	December 10, 2019	"Watermelon Sugar"	
56	719	Billie Eilish	December 19, 2019	"Bad Guy" "Ocean Eyes" "All the Good Girls Go to Hell" "When the Party's Over"	

=== 2020 ===
#	Episode	Guest(s)	Date of first broadcast	Songs	Ref.
57	730	Meghan Trainor (eventually joined by Dr. Phil)	January 30, 2020	"All About That Bass" "Like I'm Gonna Lose You" "Nice To Meet Ya" "Funk"	
58	735	Justin Bieber (3)	February 18, 2020	"I Don't Care" "Yummy" "Love Yourself" "Intentions" "One Less Lonely Girl"	
59	739	BTS	February 25, 2020	"Mic Drop" "I'll Be There for You" "Finesse" "On" "Black Swan" "Circles"	
60	749	Niall Horan	March 12, 2020	"Slow Hands" "Nice to Meet Ya" "Steal My Girl" "Put a Little Love on Me" "No Judgement"	

=== 2021 ===
#	Episode	Guest(s)	Date of first broadcast	Songs	Ref.
61	936	The cast of Friends	June 17, 2021	"I'll Be There for You"	
62	955	Camila Cabello, Billy Porter & Idina Menzel	September 9, 2021	"Mamma Mia" "Let It Go" "Million to One" "Defying Gravity" "And I Am Telling You I'm Not Going"	

=== 2022 ===
#	Episode	Guest(s)	Date of first broadcast	Songs	Ref.
63	1048	Nicki Minaj	April 6, 2022	"Anaconda" "Monster" "Someone like You" "Blick Blick" "Super Bass" "Do We Have a Problem?" "Chun-Li" "Starships"	
64	1049	Camila Cabello (2)	April 18, 2022	"Havana" "Don't Go Yet" "Bam Bam" "Liar" "Mr. Brightside"	
65	1085	Lizzo	June 27, 2022	"Good as Hell" "Juice" "Crazy in Love" "Special" "About Damn Time" "Truth Hurts"	

=== 2023 ===
#	Episode	Guest(s)	Date of first broadcast	Songs	Ref.
66	1178	Bad Bunny	March 14, 2023	"Dakiti" "I Like It" "Tití Me Preguntó" "Break Free" "As It Was"	
67	1183	Lil Nas X	March 27, 2023	"Old Town Road" "Industry Baby" "That's What I Want" "Montero (Call Me by Your Name)"	
68	1191	BLACKPINK	April 18, 2023	"Pink Venom" "DDU-DU DDU-DU" "No Scrub" "How You Like That" "Wannabe"	
69	1193	Diddy	April 20, 2023	"Bad Boy for Life" "Diddy" "I'll Be Missing You" "I Need a Girl (Part 2)" "New York, New York"	
70	1194	Adele (2)	April 24, 2023	"Rolling in the Deep" "Love is a Game" "I Drink Wine" "Don't Rain on My Parade" "Hometown Glory"	

=== The Late Late Show Primetime Special ===
Special broadcasts on prime time (10 pm) highlighting the Carpool Karaoke segment of The Late Late Show. The first show broadcast on March 29, 2016, on CBS won the Primetime Emmy Awards 2016 for "Outstanding Variety Special" category.

Episode	Guest(s)	Date of first broadcast	Ref.
1	Highlights from past segments, James Corden's favorite moments from his first year as host of the show Jennifer Lopez (new)	March 29, 2016	
2	Bruno Mars, Crosswalk Musical, Highlights from past segments, Dance skit with Jennifer Lopez, Katy Perry (new)	May 22, 2017	
3	"Carpool Karaoke" with Christina Aguilera (new), "Crosswalk the Musical: The Sound of Music" with Kunal Nayyar, Iain Armitage, Allison Janney, and Anna Faris	April 23, 2018	
4	Crosswalk the Musical - The Work of Andrew Lloyd Webber, Paul McCartney, James Skydives with Tom Cruise, Celine Dion (new)	May 20, 2019	
5	Highlights from past segments, Adele	April 27, 2023	

== Influence ==
Spike launched a series inspired by the segment that premiered on Apple TV on January 12, 2017. Titled Caraoke Showdown, it was hosted by Craig Robinson, and tasked passengers with competing in different karaoke-style challenges while on a car trip.

In Sweden, Nanne Grönvall performed in the Melodifestivalen 2020 song contest with a song titled "Carpool Karaoke", whose lyrics discussed how she wanted to sing with Corden on his show.

== Apple Music series ==
In 2016, Apple Music announced that it would distribute a TV series, based on Corden's segment, called Carpool Karaoke: The Series. The series premiered on August 8, 2017, with new episodes each Wednesday, available to Apple Music subscribers. It was renewed for a second season in February 2018 and a third season in July 2019.

== International versions ==
Country	Title	Network	Host	Premiere	Ref.
Algeria	Carpool Karaoke Algeria	Echorouk TV	Ryad Ben Amor		
France	Plan C	TF1	Camille Combal	June 14, 2019	
Israel	Carpool Karaoke	KAN 11	Nicky Goldstein	May 15, 2017	
Italy	Carpool Karaoke	Italia 1	Jake La Furia	April 27, 2017	
Jordan	Carpool Karaoke Jordan	Al Nashama TV	Uday Zoubi	April 3, 2022	
Saudi Arabia	Carpool Karaoke KSA	SBC	Hisham Al Howaish	January 26, 2020	
Slovenia	Avto karaoke	Pop	Lado Bizovičar	2017	
United Arab Emirates	Carpool Karaoke Arabia	Dubai TV	Hisham Al Howaish	February 18, 2018	

== See also ==
- List of The Late Late Show with James Corden episodes
- Carpool
