= Smallfoot (disambiguation) =

Smallfoot is 2018 American animated musical comedy film.

Smallfoot or Small Foot may also refer to:

- Smallfoot (soundtrack), 2018
- Caldera Smallfoot, a rapid application development toolkit and an embedded operating system
- Small Foot, a GoBots character

== See also ==
- Foot
