= List of number-one albums of 2020 (Ireland) =

The Irish Albums Chart ranks the best-performing albums in Ireland, as compiled by the Official Charts Company on behalf of the Irish Recorded Music Association.

== Chart history ==
Issue date	Album	Artist	Reference
3 January	Without Fear	Dermot Kennedy	
10 January	Divinely Uninspired to a Hellish Extent	Lewis Capaldi	
17 January	Divinely Uninspired to a Hellish Extent	Lewis Capaldi	
24 January	Music to Be Murdered By	Eminem	
31 January	Divinely Uninspired to a Hellish Extent	Lewis Capaldi	
7 February	Divinely Uninspired to a Hellish Extent	Lewis Capaldi	
14 February	Divinely Uninspired to a Hellish Extent	Lewis Capaldi	
21 February	Divinely Uninspired to a Hellish Extent	Lewis Capaldi	
28 February	Map of the Soul: 7	BTS	
6 March	Loving Everywhere I Go	Hudson Taylor	
13 March	Divinely Uninspired to a Hellish Extent	Lewis Capaldi	
20 March	Heartbreak Weather	Niall Horan	
27 March	After Hours	The Weeknd	
3 April	Future Nostalgia	Dua Lipa	
10 April	Future Nostalgia	Dua Lipa	
17 April	Future Nostalgia	Dua Lipa	
24 April	The Bonny	Gerry Cinnamon	
1 May	Without Fear	Dermot Kennedy	
8 May	Dark Lane Demo Tapes	Drake	
15 May	Divinely Uninspired to a Hellish Extent	Lewis Capaldi	
22 May	Divinely Uninspired to a Hellish Extent	Lewis Capaldi	
29 May	Dissimulation	KSI	
5 June	Chromatica	Lady Gaga	
12 June	Chromatica	Lady Gaga	
19 June	MTV Unplugged (Live at Hull City Hall)	Liam Gallagher	
26 June	Rough and Rowdy Ways	Bob Dylan	
3 July	Without Fear	Dermot Kennedy	
10 July	Shoot for the Stars, Aim for the Moon	Pop Smoke	
17 July	Legends Never Die	Juice Wrld	
24 July	Legends Never Die	Juice Wrld	
31 July	Folklore	Taylor Swift	
7 August	True Love Waits	The Coronas	
14 August	Folklore	Taylor Swift	
21 August	Folklore	Taylor Swift	
28 August	Imploding the Mirage	The Killers	
4 September	Folklore	Taylor Swift	
11 September	Without Fear	Dermot Kennedy	
18 September	Shoot for the Stars, Aim for the Moon	Pop Smoke	
25 September	Shoot for the Stars, Aim for the Moon	Pop Smoke	
2 October	Shoot for the Stars, Aim for the Moon	Pop Smoke	
9 October	Boxes	Gavin James	
16 October	Shoot for the Stars, Aim for the Moon	Pop Smoke	
23 October	Shoot for the Stars, Aim for the Moon	Pop Smoke	
30 October	Letter to You	Bruce Springsteen	
6 November	Positions	Ariana Grande	
13 November	Confetti	Little Mix	
20 November	Power Up	AC/DC	
27 November	Be	BTS	
4 December	Without Fear	Dermot Kennedy	
11 December	Without Fear	Dermot Kennedy	
18 December	Without Fear	Dermot Kennedy	
25 December	Without Fear	Dermot Kennedy	

== Number-one artists ==
Position	Artist	Weeks at No. 1
1	Lewis Capaldi	9
2	Dermot Kennedy	8
3	Pop Smoke	6
4	Taylor Swift	4
5	Dua Lipa	3
6	Lady Gaga	2
6	Juice Wrld	2
6	BTS	2
9	Eminem	1
9	Hudson Taylor	1
9	Niall Horan	1
9	The Weeknd	1
9	Gerry Cinnamon	1
9	Drake	1
9	KSI	1
9	Liam Gallagher	1
9	Bob Dylan	1
9	The Coronas	1
9	The Killers	1
9	Gavin James	1
9	Bruce Springsteen	1
9	Ariana Grande	1
9	Little Mix	1
9	AC/DC	1

== See also ==
- List of number-one singles of 2020 (Ireland)
