= Smallfoot (soundtrack) =

2018 film score by Heitor Pereira and various artists

Smallfoot (Original Motion Picture Soundtrack)

Soundtrack album / film score by Heitor Pereira and various artists
- Released: September 21, 2018
- Recorded: 2017–2018
- Studio: Eastwood Scoring Stage, Warner Bros. Studios, Burbank, California
- Genre: Film score; soundtrack album
- Length: 69:33
- Label: WaterTower Music

Heitor Pereira chronology
Show Dogs (2018)	Smallfoot (2018)	Playmobil: The Movie (2019)

Smallfoot (Original Motion Picture Soundtrack) is the soundtrack album to the 2018 animated film musical comedy film Smallfoot from Warner Animation Group, directed by Karey Kirkpatrick. The soundtrack was released on September 21, 2018, under the WaterTower Music label and featured original songs performed by Channing Tatum, James Corden, Zendaya and Common, along with Cyn and Niall Horan. Heitor Pereira's score accompanied the remainder of the album.

== Background ==
Smallfoot originally had no songs until six months into production, when the idea of developing it into a musical film came from Toby Emmerich, who was recently elected as chairman of the Warner Bros. at the time, partially because the Kirkpatrick brothers had previously written the music and lyrics for the Tony-winning Broadway musical Something Rotten!. Later, six original songs were written for the film; a new rendition of the classic rock song "Under Pressure" (1981) by David Bowie and Queen, was performed by Corden in a karaoke bar sequence. The initial idea was about a karaoke track which Corden was to sing along "but then he goes rogue and makes up his own lyrics to fit his own particular story that he's trying to tell". With few surviving members of the band, including the lead guitarist and backing vocalist Brian May approving, the duo wrote new lyrics and a melody over the existing song. The other original songs were performed by the cast, along with two songs performed by Cyn and Niall Horan, respectively.

Heitor Pereira composed the film score. It was recorded at the Eastwood Scoring Stage in Warner Bros. Studios, Burbank, California, with Nick Glennie-Smith, a longtime collaborator of Pereira conducting and orchestrating the Hollywood Studio Symphony.

== Release ==
The first single from the album "Finally Free" by Niall Horan was released through Capitol Records on July 13, 2018. The second single "Wonderful Life" was released on August 17, followed by "Percy's Pressure" on August 24, and "Moment of Truth" on September 5. The soundtrack was released through WaterTower Music on September 21.

== Track listing ==
No.	Title	Artist(s)	Length
1.	"Perfection"	Channing Tatum	2:33
2.	"Wonderful Life"	Zendaya	3:10
3.	"Percy's Pressure"	James Corden	2:15
4.	"Wonderful Questions"	Tatum; Zendaya	2:12
5.	"Let It Lie"	Common	5:13
6.	"Moment of Truth"	Cyn	3:50
7.	"Finally Free"	Niall Horan	3:24
8.	"This Is My World"		2:18
9.	"Practice Gong"		1:45
10.	"Plane Crash"		1:12
11.	"Banished"		1:14
12.	"Jumping Spider"		1:39
13.	"The S.E.S"		5:02
14.	"New World"		2:31
15.	"Migo Meets the Smallfoot"		4:09
16.	"Bear Cave"		3:03
17.	"Grow a Conscience"		1:39
18.	"Up the Mountain"		0:46
19.	"Behold, the Smallfoot!"		3:42
20.	"Meechee and Percy"		0:55
21.	"Public Betrayal"		3:22
22.	"Dorgle Pep Talk"		2:28
23.	"Where Is Meechee?"		2:15
24.	"Village Escape"		4:51
25.	"Clouds Lifted"		4:05
Total length:			69:33

== Reception ==
Michael Rechtshaffen of The Hollywood Reporter criticized the soundtrack as "generic" and "forgettable Disney-wannabe original songs" except for "Let It Lie". Simran Hans of The Guardian admitted that "the songs are a bum note". Kyle Kruse of The Daily Nebraskan wrote "the soundtrack to the movie is surprisingly catchy [...] Each song serves a purpose in the story. They move the plot forward in a way you'd expect from any good musical. The song 'Percy's Pressure' uses Queen's 'Under Pressure' to provide the main beat. However, in the movie, it's being played in a karaoke bar, allowing the characters to change the lyrics to fit the plot. But the song 'Let It Lie,' performed by Common, is probably the best track in the movie. It's a 'Hamilton'-esque hip-hop song that injects the soundtrack with an interesting flavor not often found in animated movies."

Ben Kenigsberg of The New York Times was critical of the unoriginality of the songs, but added "Common gives the movie a much-needed jolt rapping 'Let It Lie,' a song with the theme that some lies are good." Peter Hartlaub of Datebook was further critical of the "lazy" songwriting, especially on the song "Wonderful Life" where it "stammers with songwriting that soars too high, and lyrics that will make your head hurt". IndieWire wrote "The original songs are a nice touch, but never particularly memorable."

== Accolades ==
Award	Date of ceremony	Category	Recipients	Result	Ref.
Annie Awards	February 2, 2019	Annie Award for Music in a Feature Production	Heitor Pereira, Karey Kirkpatrick, Wayne Kirkpatrick	Nominated	
Hollywood Music in Media Awards	November 14, 2018	Original Score – Animated Film	Heitor Pereira	Nominated	
Hollywood Music in Media Awards	November 14, 2018	Original Song – Animated Film	Niall Horan – ("Finally Free")	Nominated	

== Charts ==
Chart performance for Smallfoot (Original Motion Picture Soundtrack)
Chart (2018)	Peak position
US Billboard 200	8
US Soundtrack Albums (Billboard)	3
