= Tommy Lefroy =

England-based indie rock duo

- Tommy Lefroy performing at Sneaky Dees

Background information
- Origin: London, England
- Genres: Indie; folk rock; soft rock
- Years active: 2017–present
- Labels: LAB Records, Pheromone Recordings
- Members: Tessa Mouzourakis; Wynter Bethel
- Website: www.tommylefroy.com

Tommy Lefroy is an indie rock duo based in London, England, consisting of Canadian singer Tessa Mouzourakis and American singer Wynter Bethel. They received a Juno Award nomination in the Breakthrough Group of the Year category at the 2023 ceremony.

== Career ==
The duo first met in Nashville, Tennessee, U.S., in 2017, where both were trying to establish themselves as professional songwriters. They began working together in 2018 after Bethel was exposed to Mouzourakis's online cover of "Ketchum, ID" by boygenius. The name "Tommy Lefroy" is a reference to Thomas Langlois Lefroy, an Irish politician who is thought to be an inspiration for the character of Mr. Darcy in Jane Austen's novel Pride and Prejudice.

The duo began releasing music in 2021, recording their debut EP Flight Risk in November of the same year. The EP's single "The Cause" gained popularity on TikTok, helping introduce the duo to a wider audience. They signed to Pheromone Recordings in 2022, and put out the non-album single "Dog Eat Dog" as their first release for the label.

The duo released their second EP, Rivals, on March 10, 2023 through Pheromone Recordings and Cadence Music. The six-track EP explored societal expectations of women.

Their third EP, born blue, was released on October 25, 2024 through LAB Records. The songs drew inspiration from their time in London, exploring themes of love, loss, and hope.

In August 2026, the duo announced their debut studio album The Precariat, which was released on October 23, 2026 through Thirty Tigers. The album explores the themes of late-stage capitalism, coming of age in an unpredictable world, and togetherness as an antidote for isolation. In August 2026, the duo announced a series of concerts called the Save The Precariat campaign dates. They announced dates for their 2027 headline tour in October 2026.

== Discography ==
=== EPs ===
- Flight Risk (2021)
- Rivals (2023)
- born blue (2024)

=== Albums ===
- The Precariat (2026)

=== Singles ===
- Northern Towns (2021)
- Dog Eat Dog (2022)
- Jericho Beach (2022)
- Worst Case Kid (2023)
- Garden (2024)
- Girlhood, Godhood (2024)
- Let Me (2024)
- Slush Puppy (2026)
- Thief (2026)
- Angel in the House (2026)
- Vacuum (2026)
