= No Judgement =

2020 single by Niall Horan

Single by Niall Horan

from the album Heartbreak Weather
- Released: 7 February 2020
- Genre: Pop
- Length: 2:56
- Label: Capitol
- Songwriters: Alexander Izquierdo; John Ryan; Tobias Jesso Jr.; Julian Bunetta; Niall Horan
- Producers: Julian Bunetta; Tobias Jesso Jr.

Niall Horan singles chronology
"Put a Little Love on Me" (2019)	"No Judgement" (2020)	"Black and White" (2020)

Music video
- "No Judgement" on YouTube

"No Judgement" is a song by Irish singer Niall Horan. It was released through Capitol Records as the third single from his second studio album Heartbreak Weather on 7 February 2020.

== Background ==
The song's title was first teased in the music video for "Nice To Meet Ya". Horan announced the song's release on 4 February 2020.

== Composition ==
"No Judgement" is a sultry pop anthem that was compared to his song "Slow Hands". It has a smooth, upbeat melody and a punchy production with strumming guitar melody and a catchy hook. In terms of music notation, "No Judgement" was composed using 4/4 common time in the key of C♯ minor, with a tempo of 100 beats per minute. The song follows the chord progression of C♯m-E-E/G♯-A. Horan's vocal range spans from the low note C♯4 to the high note of F♯5, giving the song one octave and three notes of range.

== Live performances ==
On 11 March 2020, Horan performed the song for the first time on The Late Late Show with James Corden.

== Music video ==
The Drew Kirsch-directed music video accompanied the song's release. The music video starts out with Horan wearing a James Bond-esque white suit and talking to the viewer about a period called "No Judgement" that appears instead of the need to impress; it then transitions to him singing along and spectating scenes of an elderly couple doing random things in the rest of the video. The music video has received over 18 million views as of February 2022.

== Chart performance ==
The song debuted at number 97 on the Billboard Hot 100, becoming Horan's fifth entry on the chart. The song was more successful in Europe where in Ireland it charted at number 6 becoming the fifth top 10 hit from the album in Horan's home country and at number 39 in Scotland becoming the sixth top 40 hit in the country. Additionally the song also entered at number 47 in Belgium and number 32 in the UK becoming his fifth top 40 charting single in the country.

== Credits and personnel ==
Credits adapted from Tidal.

- Julian Bunetta – production, songwriting, backing vocals, drums, guitar, keyboards, programming
- Tobias Jesso Jr. – production, songwriting
- Alexander Izquierdo – songwriting
- John Ryan – songwriting
- Niall Horan – songwriting, backing vocals, guitar, vocals
- Will Quinell – assistant mastering engineer, studio personnel
- Matt Wolach – assistant mixer, studio personnel
- Michael Freeman – assistant mixer, studio personnel
- Jesse Munsat – assistant recording engineer, studio personnel
- Aaron Sterling – drums, percussion
- Jeff 'Da Badass' Gunnell – engineer, studio personnel
- Nate Mercereau – guitar
- Chris Gehringer – mastering engineer, studio personnel
- Mark 'Spike' Stent – mixer, studio personnel

== Track listing ==
Digital download
No.	Title	Length
1.	"No Judgement"	2:56

Digital download – Steve Void Remix
No.	Title	Length
1.	"No Judgement" (Steve Void Remix)	2:41

Digital download – Acoustic
No.	Title	Length
1.	"No Judgement" (acoustic)	3:10

== Charts ==
Chart (2020)	Peak position
Belgium (Ultratop 50 Flanders)	48
Belgium (Ultratip Bubbling Under Wallonia)	4
Canada Hot 100 (Billboard)	100
Ireland (IRMA)	6
Netherlands (Dutch Top 40)	28
Netherlands (Single Top 100)	55
New Zealand Hot Singles (RMNZ)	11
Portugal (AFP)	170
Scottish Singles Sales (Official Charts)	39
UK Singles (Official Charts)	32
US Billboard Hot 100	97
US Adult Pop Airplay (Billboard)	26
US Pop Airplay (Billboard)	30
US Rolling Stone Top 100	83

== Certifications ==
Region	Certification	Certified units/sales
Brazil (Pro-Música Brasil)	Gold	20,000^{‡}
Canada (Music Canada)	Platinum	80,000^{‡}
New Zealand (RMNZ)	Gold	15,000^{‡}
United Kingdom (BPI)	Silver	200,000^{‡}
^{‡} Sales+streaming figures based on certification alone.

== Release history ==
Region	Date	Format	Version	Label	Ref.
Various	7 February 2020	Digital download; streaming	Original	Capitol	
Australia	7 February 2020	Contemporary hit radio	Original	EMI	
United States	10 February 2020	Hot/Modern/AC radio	Original	Capitol	
United States	11 February 2020	Contemporary hit radio	Original	Capitol	
Italy	21 February 2020	Contemporary hit radio	Original	Universal	
Various	28 February 2020	Digital download; streaming	Steve Void Remix	Capitol	
Various	6 March 2020	Digital download; streaming	Acoustic	Capitol	
Italy	20 March 2020	Contemporary hit radio	Steve Void Remix	Universal	
