= Heartbreak Weather =

Studio album by Niall Horan
- Released: 13 March 2020
- Recorded: October 2018 – January 2020
- Studios: Playpen, Enemy Dojo (Calabasas); Sound City Studios (Sherman Oaks); SARM Music Village (London); Sanctuary Studios (The Bahamas); Inspiration Way, Laurel House Studios, Echo Studio (Los Angeles); The Barn Studios, State of the Ark Studios (Richmond); The Shed Studios (Van Nuys); Home Team (Nashville)
- Genres: Pop; pop rock
- Length: 46:04
- Label: Capitol
- Producers: Afterhrs; Daniel Bryer; Julian Bunetta; Noah Conrad; Teddy Geiger; Tobias Jesso Jr.; Greg Kurstin; John Ryan; Jamie Scott; Jill Lamothe

Niall Horan chronology
Flicker (2017)	Heartbreak Weather (2020)	The Show (2023)

Singles from Heartbreak Weather
- 1. "Nice to Meet Ya" Released: 4 October 2019; 2. "Put a Little Love on Me" Released: 6 December 2019; 3. "No Judgement" Released: 7 February 2020; 4. "Black and White" Released: 21 April 2020

Heartbreak Weather is the second studio album by the Irish singer and songwriter Niall Horan, released through Capitol Records on 13 March 2020. It was promoted with four singles: "Nice to Meet Ya", "Put a Little Love on Me", "No Judgement" and "Black and White".

On the Billboard 200 chart, Heartbreak Weather debuted at number four, marking Horan's second top-10 album in the United States. The album also debuted at number one on the Irish and UK album charts, marking Horan's first UK number one album as a solo artist.

== Background and recording ==
Horan announced the album on 7 February 2020 alongside the release of the third single "No Judgement", and stated in a press release that with the album, he wanted to "tell the story that was in my head, hopefully lead people down the storytelling lane of an album track listing. [...] I wanted to write songs from different sides or from someone else looking in." Horan took inspiration from the work of Bruce Springsteen as well as the Arctic Monkeys and The Weeknd. The album was recorded from October 2018 to January 2020.

== Promotion ==
=== Singles ===
"Nice to Meet Ya" was released as the album's lead single on 4 October 2019. The song was promoted with many live performances including at the 2019 MTV Europe Music Awards, Saturday Night Live and The Late Late Show with James Corden. In the official video, it mentioned Heartbreak Weather on a poster, at the timestamp 1:15. The song received a music video, directed by The Young Astronauts, which was released along with the song. The song entered many official charts worldwide including peaking at number 7 on the Irish Singles Chart, 22 on the UK Singles Chart and 63 on the US Billboard Hot 100.

"Put a Little Love on Me" serves as the second single from the album, being released on 6 December 2019. The song entered the Irish and Scottish singles chart peaking at number 32 and 38 respectively. The song received a music video which accompanied its release and was directed by Cameron Busby.

"No Judgement" was released on 7 February 2020 as the album's third single. The song was compared to Horan's 2017 single "Slow Hands". The song entered the Billboard Hot 100 and UK Singles chart peaking at number 97 and 32 respectively. The song's music video was released alongside the song and was directed by Drew Kirsch. The song also received a remix by Steve Void and an acoustic version. "Black and White" was released on 21 April 2020 as the album's fourth single.

=== Cancelled tour ===
Horan officially announced the Nice to Meet Ya Tour in October 2019. The tour was set to go through North America, Oceania, Europe and Latin America between April and December 2020. On 3 April 2020 Horan announced the tour was cancelled due to the COVID-19 pandemic. He stated he intended to tour in 2021, "when the crisis blows over." No, rescheduled dates have been announced. Lewis Capaldi, Fletcher and Maisie Peters were set to open for Horan on the tour.

== Critical reception ==
Professional ratings
Aggregate scores
Source	Rating
Metacritic	63/100
Review scores
Source	Rating
AllMusic	4/5 stars
The Guardian	3/5 stars
The Independent	2/5 stars
NME	3/5 stars
Pitchfork	4.7/10
The Telegraph	3/5 stars
The Times	2/5 stars

Heartbreak Weather received generally favourable reviews from music critics. At Metacritic, which assigns a normalised rating out of 100 to reviews from mainstream publications, the album received an average score of 63, based on eight reviews, indicating "generally favorable reviews".

AllMusic's Neil Yeung reviewed the album positively, stating that the production of the album was better than Horan's 2017 debut album, Flicker, adding that "despite the often dour and forlorn lyrical content, the songs are full-blooded and more energetic than the average breakup album". Chris DeVille, writing for Stereogum, stated that the album is "much better" than Flicker, commenting that Heartbreak Weather's writing, production, and performance all represented "an upgrade". However, he felt that "Horan is capable of evolving" but added that "such flourishes suggest this boy-band alumnus may someday grow up to be the man after all — or at the very least he won't be desperate for a reunion tour". Jason Scott, writing for American Songwriter, named the record "a stylistic leveling-up" while complimenting Horan's take on heartbreak. Michael Cragg of The Guardian highlighted that the album contains "hints of experimentation, such as the swaggering hybrid of Arctic Monkeys and Kasabian in "Nice To Meet Ya", but it's the excellent title track's flirtation with glossy, synth-tinged MOR that suggests where Horan might be headed next. Proof that it's often the quiet ones you need to keep an eye on". Mike Wass, writing for Idolator, wrote that the record "just might be pop's first, feel-good breakup album" and that "there's no sophomore slump here" while calling it "a winning collection of love songs from multiple perspectives with very few skips."

Some reviews were more mixed. Mark Kennedy of the Associated Press called the album an "overall bright collection" and felt that Horan made "14 perfectly fine tracks, if not volcanic ones" and that it "is in no way a disaster" but that "it's just not an improvement on his debut effort". Ella Kemp of NME called the album "a mixed bag" and felt that there was "a great voice let down by some not great songs", writing that Horan's "lyrical landscape is somewhat thinner and the production even more impenetrable" than that of Flicker. She concluded by complimenting Horan's "incredible" and "convincing" voice, adding that the album "isn't an entirely lost cause, but one to build upon for a more inspiring future all the same". Adam White, writing for The Independent, described Heartbreak Weather as "a tranquilliser of an album that only occasionally sparks to life" and "largely drab", explaining that Horan "struggles to define his musical identity on his shiny if haphazard second album" which is "entirely stuck on safe mode". Nevertheless, White specifically praised "New Angel" and "Arms of a Stranger", calling the latter "concert-ready and irresistibly shiny". Writing for The Telegraph, Neil McCormick felt like the album lacks "any particular character" and that "everything sounds like something you might have heard somewhere before", stating that the record is "the closest thing to a One Direction album since the band split". Ed Power of the Irish Examiner wrote that Horan "ticks the boxes but doesn't cause a storm". Quinn Moreland, writing for Pitchfork, felt that Horan "spends too much of the record bouncing between sounds and songwriting concepts to feel distinct" but did compliment the album's final track, "Still," calling it "the realest, rawest moment on the record and a small bit of proof that Horan has the potential to make it on his own."

== Commercial performance ==
Heartbreak Weather debuted atop the Irish Albums Chart and UK Albums Chart.

In the United States, the album debuted at number four with 59,000 equivalent album units (42,000 pure) in its first week, making it the top-selling album of the week. The album also debuted at number one on the Top Album Sales chart, marking Horan's second leader on the list, following his debut album, Flicker.

== Track listing ==
Heartbreak Weather track listing
No.	Title	Writer(s)	Producer(s)	Length
1.	"Heartbreak Weather"	Niall Horan; Julian Bunetta; Jamie Scott; John Ryan	Bunetta	3:20
2.	"Black and White"	Horan; Bunetta; Teddy Geiger; Alexander Izquierdo; Scott Harris	Bunetta; Geiger	3:13
3.	"Dear Patience"	Horan; Bunetta; Ryan; Geiger; Harris	Ryan; Afterhrs	3:14
4.	"Bend the Rules"	Horan; Bunetta; Ryan; Tobias Jesso Jr.	Bunetta	3:54
5.	"Small Talk"	Horan; Daniel Bryer; Scott; Noah Conrad; Mike Needle	Bryer; Scott; Conrad; Needle^{[a]}	3:17
6.	"Nice to Meet Ya"	Horan; Bunetta; Jesso Jr.; Ruth-Anne Cunningham	Bunetta	2:38
7.	"Put a Little Love on Me"	Horan; Bryer; Scott; Needle	Bryer; Scott; Needle^{[a]}	3:44
8.	"Arms of a Stranger"	Horan; Bryer; Scott; Needle	Greg Kurstin	2:40
9.	"Everywhere"	Horan; Ryan; Harris; Izquierdo; Bunetta	Ryan	2:48
10.	"Cross Your Mind"	Horan; Ryan; Harris; Izquierdo; Geiger	Ryan; Geiger	3:48
11.	"New Angel"	Horan; Kurstin; Maureen "Mozella" McDonald; Amy Allen	Kurstin	3:09
12.	"No Judgement"	Horan; Bunetta; Jesso Jr.; Izquierdo; Ryan	Bunetta; Jesso Jr.	2:56
13.	"San Francisco"	Horan; Bunetta; Jesso Jr.; Cunningham	Bunetta; Jesso Jr.; Geiger	3:12
14.	"Still"	Horan; Bryer; Scott; Needle	Bryer; Scott; Needle^{[a]}	4:11
Total length:				46:04

US Target and international CD deluxe edition (bonus tracks)
No.	Title	Writer(s)	Producer(s)	Length
15.	"Dress"	Horan; Kurstin; Julia Michaels	Kurstin	3:26
16.	"Nothing"	Horan; Bunetta; Ryan; Jesso Jr.	Bunetta; Jesso Jr.; Jeff Gunnell	2:45
Total length:				52:15

5th anniversary deluxe edition (bonus tracks)^{[b]}
No.	Title	Writer(s)	Length
17.	"Nice to Meet Ya" (stripped)	Horan; Bunetta; Jesso Jr.; Cunningham	2:42
18.	"Small Talk" (live at the Royal Albert Hall)	Horan; Bryer; Scott; Conrad; Needle	3:25
19.	"No Judgement" (recorded at AIR Studios, London)	Horan; Bunetta; Jesso Jr.; Izquierdo; Ryan	3:11
20.	"Put a Little Love on Me" (live from Vevo)	Horan; Bryer; Scott; Needle	3:25
21.	"Black and White" (stripped)	Horan; Bunetta; Geiger; Izquierdo; Harris	3:52
22.	"Everywhere" (live on tour)	Horan; Ryan; Harris; Izquierdo; Bunetta
23.	"Dear Patience" (live at the Royal Albert Hall)	Horan; Bunetta; Ryan; Geiger; Harris	3:22

=== Notes ===
- ^{^[a]} signifies a vocal producer
- ^{^[b]} track 22 is exclusive to the vinyl version

== Personnel ==
Credits adapted from the liner notes of Heartbreak Weather.

=== Studios ===
Main recording locations

- Playpen (Calabasas) – recording (tracks 1, 3, 9, 10)
- Sound City Studios (Sherman Oaks) – recording (tracks 1, 2, 6, 10, 13, 16 (bonus))
- SARM Music Village (London) – recording (tracks 1–4, 9, 10, 12)
- Sanctuary Studios (The Bahamas) – recording (tracks 2–4, 9, 10, 12)
- Inspiration Way (Los Angeles) – recording (track 2)
- Enemy Dojo (Calabasas) – recording (tracks 4, 12, 16 (bonus))
- The Barn Studios (Richmond) – recording (tracks 5, 7, 14)
- State of the Ark Studios (Richmond) – recording (tracks 5, 7, 14)
- The Shed Studios (Van Nuys) – recording (track 5)
- Laurel House Studios (Los Angeles) – recording (tracks 6, 13)
- Echo Studio (Los Angeles) – recording (tracks 8, 11, 15)
- Home Team (Nashville) – recording (track 13)

Additional recording locations

- Air Studios (London) – strings (track 14)

Engineering locations

- Camden Recording Studios (Dublin, Ireland) – additional engineering (track 15 (bonus))

Mixing and mastering locations

- Mixsuite LA (Los Angeles) – mixing
- Sterling Sound (New York) – mastering

=== Vocals and musicians ===
- Niall Horan – lead vocals, background vocals (tracks 1–4, 6, 9, 12, 14, 16 (bonus)), guitar (tracks 3–4, 6–7, 12, 16 (bonus)), acoustic guitar (tracks 5, 14)
- Julian Bunetta – background vocals (tracks 1, 4, 6, 12–13, 16 (bonus)), keys (tracks 1, 4, 12–13), bass (tracks 1, 4), guitar (tracks 2, 4, 6, 10, 12–13), drums (tracks 2–3, 6, 12, 16 (bonus)), piano (track 2), keyboards (track 6)
- John Ryan – background vocals (tracks 1, 3–4, 9, 16 (bonus)), guitar (tracks 1, 3, 9, 16 (bonus)), keys (tracks 3, 9), bass (tracks 3, 9, 12)
- Jamie Scott – background vocals (tracks 1, 5, 14), piano, drums, bass (tracks 7, 14), electric guitar, acoustic guitar, string arrangement (track 14)
- Tobias Jesso Jr. – background vocals (tracks 4, 6, 16 (bonus))
- Afterhrs – keys (tracks 1, 4)
- Nate Mercereau – guitar (tracks 1–3, 10, 12), bass (track 2)
- Teddy Geiger – guitar (tracks 2, 13)
- Forrest Miller – fiddle (track 2)
- Derreck Wells – guitar (track 4)
- Mike Needle – background vocals (tracks 5, 14)
- Daniel Bryer – background vocals, electric guitar (tracks 5, 14), drums (track 14)
- Noah Conrad – acoustic guitar, electric guitar, drums, bass (track 5)
- Jake Cartwright – electric guitar (track 5), orchestral drum (track 14)
- Andrew Haas – bass (tracks 6, 16 (bonus))
- Ruth-Anne Cunningham – background vocals (track 6)
- Luke Potashnick – guitars (track 7), acoustic guitar, electric guitar (track 14)
- Songa Lee – violin (track 7)
- Charlie Bisharat – violin (track 7)
- Alma Fernandez – violin (track 7)
- Jacob Braun – cello (track 7)
- Greg Kurstin – guitar, bass (tracks 8, 11, 15 (bonus)), drums, synthesizers, keyboards (tracks 8, 11), strings arrangement (track 7), piano (tracks 8, 15 (bonus)), tiple (track 15 (bonus))
- Aaron Sterling – drums (tracks 12, 15 (bonus)), percussion (track 12)
- Benji Lysaght – guitar (tracks 13, 16 (bonus))
- Max Whipple – bass (track 13)
- Kane Richotte – percussion (track 13)
- Martin Hannah – shaker (track 14)
- Ed Blunt – string arrangement (track 14)
- Simon Baggs – violin (track 14)
- Danny Bhattacharya – violin (track 14)
- Shlomy Dobrinsky – violin (track 14)
- Cindy Foster – violin (track 14)
- Dorina Markoff – violin (track 14)
- Dominic Moore – violin (track 14)
- Helen Paterson – violin (track 14)
- Manuel Porta – violin (track 14)
- Patrick Savage – violin (track 14)
- Jo Watts – violin (track 14)
- Nick Barr – viola (track 14)
- Fiona Bonds – viola (track 14)
- Morgan Goff – viola (track 14)
- Yuri Zhislin – viola (track 14)
- Chris Fish – cello (track 14)
- Rachel Lander – cello (track 14)
- Conor Masterson – violin (track 15 (bonus))
- Dernst (D'Mile) Emile II – organ (track 16 (bonus))

=== Production ===
- Jill Lamothe – production
- Julian Bunetta – production (tracks 1–2, 4, 6, 12–13, 16 (bonus))
- Teddy Geiger – production (tracks 2, 10, 13)
- John Ryan – production (tracks 3, 9–10)
- Afterhrs – production (track 3)
- Daniel Bryer – production, vocal production (tracks 5, 7, 14)
- Jamie Scott – production, vocal production (tracks 5, 7, 14)
- Noah Conrad – production (track 5)
- Mike Needle – vocal production (tracks 5, 7, 14)
- Greg Kurstin – production (tracks 8, 11, 15 (bonus)), strings production (track 7)
- Tobias Jesso Jr. – production (tracks 12–13, 16 (bonus))
- Jeff Gunnell – production (track 16 (bonus))

=== Technical ===
- Mark 'Spike' Stent – mixing
- Michael Freeman – mix assistant
- Matt Wolach – additional mix assistant
- Jeff Gunnell – engineering (tracks 1–4, 9–10, 12–13, 16 (bonus)), assistant engineering (track 6), programming (track 16 (bonus))
- Mike Malchicoff – engineering (tracks 1–2, 6, 10, 13, 16 (bonus))
- Will Maclellan – assistant engineering (tracks 1, 10, 13, 16 (bonus))
- Veronica Wyman – engineering, assistant engineering (track 2)
- Richard Evatt – assistant engineering (tracks 2–4), engineering (track 9)
- Teddy Geiger – programming (tracks 2, 13)
- Jesse Munsat – assistant engineering (tracks 3, 9, 12)
- John Ryan – programming (tracks 3–4), engineering (tracks 9–10)
- Julian Bunetta – programming (tracks 1, 4, 12–13), engineering (track 6)
- Afterhrs – programming (tracks 1, 4)
- Martin Hannah – engineering (tracks 5, 7, 14)
- Noah Conrad – engineering, programming (track 5)
- Matt Cooke – assistant engineering (tracks 5, 14), engineering (track 7)
- Jake Cartwright – assistant engineering (tracks 5, 14)
- Jamie Scott – programming (tracks 5, 14)
- Daniel Bryer – programming (tracks 5, 14)
- Greg Kurstin – engineering (tracks 8, 11, 15 (bonus))
- Alex Pasco – engineering (tracks 8, 11, 15 (bonus))
- Julian Burg – engineering (tracks 8, 11, 15 (bonus))
- Ed Reyes – additional engineering (track 11)
- Jack Power – additional engineering (track 15 (bonus))
- Chris Gehringer – mastering
- Will Quinnell – assistant mastering

=== Artwork and management ===
- Liz Isik – A&R admin
- Erynn Hill – A&R coordinator
- Martha Braithwaite – business affairs
- David Helfer – business affairs
- The Young Astronauts – art direction
- Dean Martindale – photography
- Mitra Darab – marketing

== Charts ==
=== Weekly charts ===
2020 weekly chart performance for Heartbreak Weather
Chart (2020)	Peak position
Australian Albums (ARIA)	2
Austrian Albums (Ö3 Austria)	3
Belgian Albums (Ultratop Flanders)	4
Belgian Albums (Ultratop Wallonia)	24
Canadian Albums (Billboard)	6
Czech Albums (ČNS IFPI)	32
Danish Albums (Hitlisten)	14
Dutch Albums (Album Top 100)	4
Estonian Albums (Eesti Tipp-40)	4
Finnish Albums (Suomen virallinen lista)	15
French Albums (SNEP)	73
German Albums (Offizielle Top 100)	5
Irish Albums (Official Charts)	1
Italian Albums (FIMI)	32
Japanese Albums (Oricon)	87
Mexican Albums (AMPROFON)	1
New Zealand Albums (RMNZ)	4
Norwegian Albums (VG-lista)	8
Polish Albums (ZPAV)	7
Portuguese Albums (AFP)	4
Scottish Albums (Official Charts)	3
Spanish Albums (Promusicae)	4
Swedish Albums (Sverigetopplistan)	21
Swiss Albums (Schweizer Hitparade)	10
UK Albums (Official Charts)	1
US Billboard 200	4

2025 weekly chart performance for Heartbreak Weather
Chart (2025)	Peak position
German Albums (Offizielle Top 100)	4

=== Year-end charts ===
Year-end chart performance for Heartbreak Weather
Chart (2020)	Position
Australian Albums (ARIA)	66
Belgian Albums (Ultratop Flanders)	94
Dutch Albums (Album Top 100)	94
Irish Albums (IRMA)	12
US Top Album Sales (Billboard)	100

Chart (2021)	Position
Belgian Albums (Ultratop Flanders)	172
Spanish Albums (PROMUSICAE)	95

== Certifications ==
Certifications for Heartbreak Weather
Region	Certification	Certified units/sales
Brazil (Pro-Música Brasil) 5 Year Anniversary Edition	Gold	20,000^{‡}
Canada (Music Canada)	Platinum	80,000^{‡}
Denmark (IFPI Danmark)	Gold	10,000^{‡}
New Zealand (RMNZ)	Gold	7,500^{‡}
Poland (ZPAV)	Gold	10,000^{‡}
United Kingdom (BPI)	Gold	100,000^{‡}
^{‡} Sales+streaming figures based on certification alone.

== Release history ==
Release formats for Heartbreak Weather
Region	Date	Format(s)	Label	Ref.
Various	13 March 2020	CD; digital download; LP; streaming	Capitol	

== See also ==
- List of 2020 albums
- List of number-one albums of 2020 (Ireland)
- List of number-one albums of 2020 (Mexico)
- List of UK Albums Chart number ones of the 2020s
