= Meltdown (Niall Horan song) =

2023 single by Niall Horan

Single by Niall Horan

from the album The Show
- Released: 28 April 2023
- Length: 2:33
- Label: Capitol
- Songwriter(s): Niall Horan; Amy Allen; Joel Little; John Ryan
- Producer(s): Little; Ryan

Niall Horan singles chronology
"Heaven" (2023)	"Meltdown" (2023)	"You Could Start a Cult" (2023)

"Meltdown" is a song by Irish singer-songwriter Niall Horan, released through Capitol Records as the second single from his third studio album The Show released on 28 April 2023.

== Background and release ==
On 13 April 2023, Horan announced the release of "Meltdown". Taking to social media to discuss the song, Horan shared: "[the] song is basically about feeling anxious and being in that kind of freaking out moment but knowing deep down that everything will be alright."

On 19 May 2023, Horan released an acoustic version of the single.

== Live performances ==
On 15 May 2023, Horan performed "Meltdown" on The Voice.

== Chart performance ==
In Ireland, "Meltdown" debuted at number 15 on the Official Irish Singles Chart Top 50 on 5 May 2023.

In the United Kingdom, on 2 May 2023, the Official Charts Company released their midweek chart predictions, and placed "Meltdown" at debuting at number 52 on the UK Official Singles Chart Top 100. However, "Meltdown" debuted at number 62 on the UK Official Singles Chart Top 100 and debuted at number 48 on the UK Official Singles Downloads Chart Top 100 on 5 May 2023.

In New Zealand, the single debuted at number 1 on the New Zealand Hot Singles Chart. (RMNZ).

== Charts ==
Chart performance for "Meltdown"
Chart (2023–2024)	Peak position
Czech Republic (Rádio – Top 100)	78
Ireland (IRMA)	15
Japan Hot Overseas (Billboard Japan)	12
Netherlands (Dutch Top 40 Tiparade)	1
Netherlands (Single Tip)	7
New Zealand Hot Singles (RMNZ)	1
San Marino (SMRRTV Top 50)	35
UK Singles (OCC)	62

== Release history ==
Release dates and formats for "Meltdown"
Region	Version	Date	Format(s)	Label	Ref.
Various	Original	28 April 2023	Digital download; streaming	Capitol	
Italy	Original	28 April 2023	Radio airplay	Universal	
Various	Original	25 August 2023	7-inch single; CD single	Capitol	
Various	Acoustic	19 May 2023	Digital download; streaming	Capitol	
