= Black and White (Niall Horan song) =

2020 single by Niall Horan

- Stripped single cover

Single by Niall Horan

from the album Heartbreak Weather
- Released: 21 April 2020
- Genre: Pop rock
- Length: 3:13
- Label: Capitol
- Songwriters: Niall Horan; Julian Bunetta; Teddy Geiger; Alexander Izquierdo; Scott Harris
- Producers: Julian Bunetta; Teddy Geiger

Niall Horan singles chronology
| "No Judgement" (2020) | "Black and White" (2020) | "Moral of the Story" (2020) |

Music video
- "Black and White" on YouTube

"Black and White" is a song by Irish singer Niall Horan from his second studio album Heartbreak Weather (2020), which it appears as the album's second track. The song additionally serves as the album's fourth and final single, being released on 21 April 2020.

== Composition ==
Musically, "Black and White" has been described as a pop rock ballad. The song was compared to the works of Ed Sheeran and Horan's former band One Direction. Lyrically, it is "a soaring declaration of eternal devotion" with visions of a wedding day and golden hour. In terms of music notation, "Black and White" was composed using 4/4 common time in the key of D major, with a tempo of 148 beats per minute. Horan's vocal range spans from the low note A2 to the high note of D5 (in the backing).

== Live performances ==
Horan first performed the song on The Late Late Show with James Corden on 13 March 2020. Horan also performed the song on 18 April 2020 on the Lady Gaga-curated One World: Together At Home television special, a benefit event by Global Citizen to raise funds for the World Health Organization's COVID-19 Solidarity Response Fund.

== Credits and personnel ==
Credits adapted from Tidal.

- Niall Horan – songwriting, vocals, backing vocals
- Julian Bunetta – production, songwriting, drums, guitar, piano
- Teddy Geiger – production, songwriting, guitar, programming
- Alexander Izquierdo – songwriting
- Scott Harris – songwriting
- Nate Mercereau – bass, guitar
- Erynn Hill – A&R
- Elizabeth Isik – A&R admin
- Mark "Spike" Stent – mixing, studio personnel
- Mike Wolach – assistant mixing, studio personnel
- Michael Freeman – assistant mixing, studio personnel
- Chris Gehringer – mastering, studio personnel
- Will Quinnell – assistant mastering engineering, studio personnel

== Charts ==
Chart performance for "Black and White"
| Chart (2020) | Peak position |
|---|---|
| Czech Republic Airplay (ČNS IFPI) | 12 |
| Ireland (IRMA) | 18 |
| Netherlands (Dutch Top 40 Tiparade) | 20 |
| New Zealand Hot Singles (RMNZ) | 10 |
| UK Singles (Official Charts) | 91 |

== Certifications ==
Certifications for "Black and White"
| Region | Certification | Certified units/sales |
|---|---|---|
| Australia (ARIA) | Platinum | 70,000^{‡} |
| Brazil (Pro-Música Brasil) | Gold | 20,000^{‡} |
| Canada (Music Canada) | Platinum | 80,000^{‡} |
| New Zealand (RMNZ) | Gold | 15,000^{‡} |
| United Kingdom (BPI) | Silver | 200,000^{‡} |
^{‡} Sales+streaming figures based on certification alone.

== Release history ==
Release dates and formats for "Black and White"
| Region | Date | Format | Label | Ref. |
|---|---|---|---|---|
| Various | 21 April 2020 | Digital download; streaming | Capitol | |
| United Kingdom | 25 April 2020 | Adult contemporary radio | Capitol | |
| Italy | 1 May 2020 | Contemporary hit radio | Universal | |
| Various | 22 May 2020 | Digital download; streaming; (stripped version) | Capitol | |
| Various | 9 June 2020 | Digital download; streaming; (Oliver Nelson remix) | Capitol | |
