= The Show (Niall Horan album) =

Studio album by Niall Horan
- Released: 9 June 2023
- Studio: Chickering (Nashville); EastWest (Hollywood); Golden Age (Hollywood); Juicy Hill (Nassau); Little Fan (Auckland); Mmm (Auckland); Playpen (Calabasas); Richmond Sound (London); Skyline (Joshua Tree)
- Length: 30:39
- Label: Capitol
- Producer: Joel Little; John Ryan; Julian Bunetta

Niall Horan chronology
Heartbreak Weather (2020)	The Show (2023)	Dinner Party (2026)

Singles from The Show
- 1. "Heaven" Released: 17 February 2023; 2. "Meltdown" Released: 28 April 2023

The Show is the third studio album by the Irish singer and songwriter Niall Horan, released through Capitol Records on 9 June 2023. Musically, it draws from rock and synth pop. The album's lead single, "Heaven" was released on 17 February 2023, followed by "Meltdown" on 28 April 2023. The album topped the charts in eight countries. A deluxe version of the album, subtitled The Encore, was released on 3 November 2023; the album was preceded by an encore version of "You Could Start a Cult", with Lizzy McAlpine.

== Background and recording ==
On 15 February 2023, Horan announced the album title and release date.

Whilst promoting the lead single, Horan told Rolling Stone: "What makes this record incredibly special to me is it's a reflection of where I am in my life today, as a person, a musician, and of course, as a songwriter," he explained in the video. "Can't say I'm not a little nervous, but hopefully you'll still like this version of me when you listen to the new record." Horan appeared Late Night with Seth Meyers and spoke about how his last album cycle for Heartbreak Weather was heavily impacted by a series of lockdowns in 2020, meaning that he was never able to tour the project. "I'd released an album the day we were told we were going into lockdown, um – some would say that was great timing! The tour got cancelled [...] So then I was sitting around waiting for something to happen, waiting for the creative juices to flow [...] Once it came it kind of opened a door for what is now a finished product, record."

In an interview with NME, Horan shared: "The last time I wrote an album I did less thinking. You don't in your early 20s, you don't think too much at all [...] I think with pandemics and relationships and things like that, you subconsciously grow as a person. And then production wise and what I'm saying [lyrically], it just sounds like something that a 30-year-old would release. Not a youthful version of what I did before."

== Promotion ==
In February 2023, Horan performed the "Heaven" chorus acoustically whilst appearing on The Late Late Show with James Corden. He appeared on The Kelly Clarkson Show and discussed writing the song at a writer's camp. Horan appeared on The Jonathan Ross Show on 11 March 2023 and performed "Heaven" on that show. On 15 May 2023, Horan performed "Meltdown" on The Voice. On 16 June 2023, Horan released a live, acoustic video of album track "You Could Start A Cult". The video was filmed in California.

=== Singles ===
"Heaven", was released on 17 February 2023 as the lead single. The song debuted at number 4 on the Irish singles chart, number 16 on the UK Official Top 100 and at number 63 in the USA on the Billboard Hot 100. "Heaven" official music video was released one week later. In Australia, "Heaven" peaked at number 30 on that country's singles chart. An acoustic version was released on 10 March 2023.

"Meltdown" served as the second official single from the album. It was released on 28 April 2023. "Meltdown" debuted at number 15 on the Official Irish Singles Chart Top 50 on 5 May 2023. In the United Kingdom, "Meltdown" debuted at number 62 on the UK Official Singles Chart Top 100 and debuted at number 48 on the UK Official Singles Downloads Chart Top 100 on 5 May 2023.

On the day of the album's release, the official music video of the song "The Show" was released. It was directed by Connor Brashier.

On 27 October 2023, Horan released "You Could Start a Cult", an alternate version from the album version, with American singer Lizzy McAlpine. The song will appear on the deluxe version of The Show: The Encore.

=== Tour ===
On 22 May 2023, Horan announced a 50-date tour promoting the album, which visited Europe, Oceania and North America in 2024. Horan later added seven more dates due to high demand.

== Critical reception ==
Professional ratings
Aggregate scores
Source	Rating
Metacritic	83/100
Review scores
Source	Rating
AllMusic	4.5/5 stars
Clash	8/10
I	3/5 stars
The Independent	4/5 stars
The Line of Best Fit	6/10
MusicOMH	4/5 stars

The Show was met with critical acclaim by music critics; it received a score of 83 out of 100 on review aggregator Metacritic based on seven critics' reviews, indicating "universal acclaim". Roisin O'Connor of The Independent called the album "the apotheosis of Horan's classic rock sound, which he has been carefully honing ever since his solo debut" and "beautifully cohesive". She wrote that it "finds Horan moving towards the lusher production sound of his former bandmate Harry Styles. Laurel Canyon references mingle easily with Eighties synth-pop and Noughties guitar rock". Writing for Clash, Hannah Sinclair found that Horan "does not disappoint with his latest eclectic release" and that the album "explores deeper meanings to previous work after having time to reflect on life during our multiple lockdowns", summarising that it "is undoubtedly Niall Horan's finest and most mature album to date – and was certainly worth the wait".

Rob Sheffield of Rolling Stone opined that The Show is "full of laid-back Laurel Canyon-inspired ballads, heavy on the mellow, full of feelings about looking for sanity in a time of personal turmoil", remarking that it is "touching to hear [Horan] get so intimate on his own" and complimenting the "empathy" he brings to "power ballads" like "Heaven". Caitlin Chatterton of The Line of Best Fit wrote that "Listening to the album in full reveals [the first two singles] as the standout tracks by a healthy margin" and that the remainder of the album "is often hampered by its predictability" despite being "far from a bad record". Rachel Martin, reviewing for Fault magazine, stated that the album was "Horan's most vulnerable and mature songwriting to date", and adding that the singer "takes cent[re] stage [...] a place he's rightfully earned."

== Commercial performance ==
In Horan's native Ireland, The Show debuted at number 1 on the Irish album chart. In the UK, the album debuted and peaked at number 1, becoming Horan's second solo number 1 album in that country. In the US, The Show sold 79,000 units in sales plus streaming in the first week of release, including 68,000 physical and digital copies sold, earning a debut at number 2 on the Billboard 200 chart and number 1 on Billboard's Top Album Sales chart and Vinyl Albums chart. It was Horan's third album to top the Top Album Sales chart. The deluxe version of the album, The Show: The Encore, was released in November 2023 and entered the UK Albums Sales Chart at number 39.

== Track listing ==
The Show track listing
No.	Title	Writer(s)	Producer(s)	Length
1.	"Heaven"	Niall Horan; Tobias Jesso Jr.; John Ryan; Joel Little	Ryan; Little	3:06
2.	"If You Leave Me"	Horan; Caroline Ailin; Julian Bunetta; Ryan; Little; Mike Sabath	Ryan; Bunetta	2:59
3.	"Meltdown"	Horan; Amy Allen; Ryan; Little	Ryan; Little	2:33
4.	"Never Grow Up"	Horan; Shane McAnally; Bunetta; Ryan	Little; Ryan; Bunetta	3:29
5.	"The Show"	Horan; Mike Needle; Daniel Bryer; Jamie Scott	Little; Scott^{[v]}	3:11
6.	"You Could Start a Cult"	Horan; Ruel van Dijk; Mark Landon; Bunetta; Ryan; Little	Little; Ryan; Bunetta	3:20
7.	"Save My Life"	Horan; Allen; Ryan	Ryan	2:57
8.	"On a Night Like Tonight"	Horan; Jacob Kasher Hindlin; Ryan	Ryan; Matt Zara^{[a]}	3:07
9.	"Science"	Horan; Needle; Bryer; Scott	Little; Scott^{[v]}	2:45
10.	"Must Be Love"	Horan; James Napier; Philip Plested; Tom Barnes; Pete Kelleher; Ben Kohn	Little; Ryan^{[a]}; TMS^{[a]}	3:09
Total length:				30:39

Japanese bonus track
No.	Title	Writer(s)	Producer(s)	Length
11.	"Heaven" (acoustic)	Horan; Jesso; Ryan; Little	Ryan	3:04
Total length:				33:43

The Show: The Encore additional tracks
No.	Title	Length
11.	"You Could Start a Cult" (with Lizzy McAlpine)	3:14
12.	"The Show" (with John Legend)	3:11
13.	"Heaven" (live from Electric Picnic)	3:11
14.	"If You Leave Me" / "Everybody Wants to Rule the World" (live from Electric Picnic)	5:17
15.	"Meltdown" (Vevo Extended Play)	3:44
16.	"Save My Life" (Live from Electric Picnic)	3:08
17.	"On a Night Like Tonight" (Vevo Extended Play)	3:38
18.	"Science" (live from Spotify Studios)	2:56
19.	"Something in the Orange" (live from Spotify Studios)	4:02
Total length:		63:00

Notes

- ^{^[a]} signifies an additional producer.
- ^{^[v]} signifies a vocal producer.

== Personnel ==
Musicians

- Niall Horan – vocals (all tracks), background vocals (tracks 1–4, 6–10); harmonica, piano (6)
- Joel Little – programming (1, 3–5, 9, 10), background vocals (1, 3, 4, 7), synthesizer (1, 4, 5, 10), piano (1, 5, 10), guitar (1, 10); bass guitar, drums (3)
- John Ryan – background vocals (1–4, 7, 8); bass guitar, programming, synthesizer (1, 3, 4, 7, 8); guitar (1, 3, 6–8, 10), drums (1, 3, 7, 8), piano (1, 4, 7), organ (4)
- Tobias Jesso Jr. – background vocals (1)
- Julian Bunetta – background vocals, drums (2, 4); programming, synthesizer (2)
- Michael Sabath – background vocals, bass guitar (2)
- Amy Allen – background vocals (3, 7)
- Dan Bryer – background vocals (5, 9)
- Jamie Scott – background vocals (5, 9), piano (9)
- Mike Needle – background vocals (5, 9)
- Sam de Jong – drums (5, 10)
- Mahuia Bridgman-Cooper – strings director, violin (5, 9)
- James Bush – cello (5, 9)
- Joe Harrop – viola (5, 9)
- Peau Halapua – violin (5, 9)
- Sean Erick – flugelhorn, trumpet (7)
- Kevin Williams Jr. – flute, tuba (7)
- Leon Silva – saxophones (7)
- Matt Zara – guitar, programming, synthesizer (8)

Technical

- Nathan Dantzler – mastering
- Spike Stent – mixing (1, 3–5, 7–10)
- Julian Bunetta – mixing (2), engineering (2, 4)
- John Ryan – mixing (6), engineering (1–6)
- Joel Little – engineering (1, 3–6)
- Jesse Munsat – engineering (1, 3)
- Jeff Gunnell – engineering (2, 4, 6)
- Martin Hannah – engineering (5)
- Harrison Tate – mastering assistance (2–10)
- Matt Wolach – mixing assistance (1, 3–5, 7–10)

== Charts ==
=== Weekly charts ===
Weekly chart performance for The Show
Chart (2023)	Peak position
Australian Albums (ARIA)	1
Austrian Albums (Ö3 Austria)	4
Belgian Albums (Ultratop Flanders)	1
Belgian Albums (Ultratop Wallonia)	2
Canadian Albums (Billboard)	5
Danish Albums (Hitlisten)	8
Dutch Albums (Album Top 100)	1
Finnish Albums (Suomen virallinen lista)	21
French Albums (SNEP)	20
German Albums (Offizielle Top 100)	2
Irish Albums (OCC)	1
Italian Albums (FIMI)	9
Japanese Hot Albums (Billboard Japan)	85
Lithuanian Albums (AGATA)	35
New Zealand Albums (RMNZ)	1
Norwegian Albums (VG-lista)	8
Polish Albums (ZPAV)	1
Portuguese Albums (AFP)	2
Scottish Albums (OCC)	1
Spanish Albums (Promusicae)	3
Swedish Albums (Sverigetopplistan)	8
Swiss Albums (Schweizer Hitparade)	6
UK Albums (OCC)	1
US Billboard 200	2

=== Year-end charts ===
2023 year-end chart performance for The Show
Chart (2023)	Position
Belgian Albums (Ultratop Flanders)	77
Dutch Albums (Album Top 100)	52
US Top Current Album Sales (Billboard)	44

2024 year-end chart performance for The Show
Chart (2024)	Position
Belgian Albums (Ultratop Flanders)	174

== Certifications ==
Certifications for The Show
Region	Certification	Certified units/sales
United Kingdom (BPI)	Silver	60,000^{‡}
^{‡} Sales+streaming figures based on certification alone.

== Release history ==
Release formats for The Show
Region	Date	Format(s)	Label	Edition	Ref.
Various	9 June 2023	Cassette; CD; digital download; streaming; vinyl	Capitol	Standard	
Various	3 November 2023	Digital download; streaming	Capitol	The Show: The Encore	
Various	5 April 2024	2×LP; CD	Capitol	The Show: The Encore	

== See also ==
- List of 2023 albums
- List of number-one albums from the 2020s (New Zealand)
- List of number-one albums of 2023 (Australia)
- List of number-one albums of 2023 (Ireland)
- List of number-one albums of 2023 (Scotland)
- List of UK Albums Chart number ones of the 2020s
