= Heaven (Niall Horan song) =

2023 single by Niall Horan

Single by Niall Horan

from the album The Show
- Released: 17 February 2023
- Genre: Pop rock
- Length: 3:06
- Label: Capitol
- Songwriters: Niall Horan; Joel Little; Tobias Jesso Jr.; John Ryan Karl Uzell
- Producers: Little; Ryan

Niall Horan singles chronology
"Everywhere" (2021)	"Heaven" (2023)	"Meltdown" (2023)

Music video
- "Heaven" on YouTube

"Heaven" is a song by Irish singer-songwriter Niall Horan, released through Capitol Records as the lead single from his third studio album The Show on 17 February 2023.

== Composition ==
The song was published in the key of F major and starts with F(add2)/Gm/F/F5/G7sus/Bbsus2 chord progression with six intro bars.

The song begins with the lyric: "Strange light revolves around you, you float across the room / Your touch is made of something heaven can't hold a candle to."

"There's so much pressure for people to hit certain milestones by a certain age – you get married at this age, buy a house at that age, have kids at some other age," Horan told Rolling Stone. "But I've never conformed to those ideas, and so I wanted to write about how we all should just focus on enjoying our lives and doing what feels right, instead of worrying about what might be expected of us."

== Promotion ==
In January 2023, fans received candles that depicted partly cloudy skies. The QR code on the candles' packaging sent fans to an interactive website (heavenwontbethesame.com) that showed a virtual version of the candle. Over the course of the week, the candle would slowly melt. When it finished melting, the outdoor setting from the song's music video appeared and there was new hidden content under a differently coloured shrub of flowers each day leading up to the song's release date. The content included a voice note from the song's writing process, along with behind-the-scenes photos from the photo shoot of Horan's third album and the set of the music video.

In February 2023, Horan performed the "Heaven" chorus acoustically whilst appearing on The Late Late Show with James Corden. He appeared on The Kelly Clarkson Show and discussed writing the song at a writer's camp. Horan released an acoustic version of "Heaven" on 10 March 2023, which had been preceded one week earlier by a video released to YouTube of the acoustic version. Horan appeared on The Jonathan Ross Show on 11 March 2023. On 17 March 2023, Horan performed the song at the White House's Saint Patrick's Day celebrations. On 18 April 2023, Horan performed "Heaven" on BBC Radio 1's Live Lounge, in addition to a cover of Lizzy McAlpine's song "Ceilings".

== Music video ==
On 17 February 2023, Horan released a lyric video to "Heaven", which was produced by Katie Temkin. On 24 February 2023, the official music video was released online. The video was directed by Dylan Knight. Drummer Emilia Schmier features throughout. The video shows Horan and Schmier playing in a room made out of red curtains; after the first chorus, Horan enters a door to a crowded party where young women dressed as nuns are seen amongst the crowd. The video alternates between the two settings. During the bridge of the song the room the party was in is empty and the walls pull away to reveal an outdoor setting with flowers and rolling hills.

== Chart performance ==
One week after the single's release, "Heaven" debuted at number 4 on the Irish singles chart, Horan's highest-charting single in the country since 2017's "Slow Hands". In the United Kingdom, the single debuted at number 18, peaking one week later at number 16, and went on to spend 12 weeks in the UK Top 40. In the Netherlands Heaven debuted at number 26. And after 13 weeks it reached number 8. In Sweden, "Heaven" debuted at number 54 on that country's singles chart. In the United States, it debuted at number 63 on the Billboard Hot 100 and peaked at number 62. In Australia, the single peaked at number 30 on the country's ARIA Chart.

One week after the single's release, the UK's Official Charts Company reported "Heaven" peaked at number 2 on the Official Trending Chart.

== Charts ==
=== Weekly charts ===
Weekly chart performance for "Heaven"
Chart (2023)	Peak position
Australia (ARIA)	30
Austria (Ö3 Austria Top 40)	47
Belgium (Ultratop 50 Flanders)	19
Belgium (Ultratop 50 Wallonia)	29
Canada Hot 100 (Billboard)	31
Canada AC (Billboard)	11
Canada CHR/Top 40 (Billboard)	16
Canada Hot AC (Billboard)	15
Czech Republic Airplay (ČNS IFPI)	11
Czech Republic Singles Digital (ČNS IFPI)	78
Estonia Airplay (TopHit)	4
Global 200 (Billboard)	43
Greece International (IFPI)	53
Ireland (IRMA)	4
Japan Hot Overseas (Billboard Japan)	10
Latvia Airplay (LaIPA)	4
Lebanon (Lebanese Top 20)	7
Lithuania (AGATA)	34
Netherlands (Dutch Top 40)	8
Netherlands (Single Top 100)	22
New Zealand (Recorded Music NZ)	34
Norway (VG-lista)	20
Poland (Polish Airplay Top 100)	4
Poland (Polish Streaming Top 100)	90
Portugal (AFP)	197
San Marino Airplay (SMRTV Top 50)	20
Singapore (RIAS)	23
Slovakia Airplay (ČNS IFPI)	38
Sweden (Sverigetopplistan)	54
Switzerland (Schweizer Hitparade)	69
UK Singles (Official Charts)	16
US Billboard Hot 100	62
US Adult Pop Airplay (Billboard)	16
US Pop Airplay (Billboard)	22

=== Year-end charts ===
Year-end chart performance for "Heaven"
Chart (2023)	Position
Belgium (Ultratop 50 Flanders)	62
Canada (Canadian Hot 100)	84
Netherlands (Dutch Top 40)	36
Poland (Polish Airplay Top 100)	51

== Certifications ==
Certifications for "Heaven"
Region	Certification	Certified units/sales
Australia (ARIA)	Platinum	70,000^{‡}
Brazil (Pro-Música Brasil)	Gold	20,000^{‡}
Canada (Music Canada)	Platinum	80,000^{‡}
Denmark (IFPI Danmark)	Gold	45,000^{‡}
New Zealand (RMNZ)	Gold	15,000^{‡}
Poland (ZPAV)	Gold	25,000^{‡}
United Kingdom (BPI)	Gold	400,000^{‡}
^{‡} Sales+streaming figures based on certification alone.

== Release history ==
Release dates and formats for "Heaven"
Region	Date	Format(s)	Version	Label	Ref.
Various	17 February 2023	Digital download; streaming	Original	Capitol	
Italy	17 February 2023	Radio airplay	Original	Universal	
United States	21 February 2023	Contemporary hit radio	Original	Capitol	
United States	27 February 2023	Hot adult contemporary radio	Original	Capitol	
Various	10 March 2023	Digital download; streaming	Acoustic	Capitol	
Various	14 April 2023	7-inch single; CD single	Original	Capitol	
