= You Could Start a Cult =

2023 single by Niall Horan and Lizzy McAlpine

Single by Niall Horan and Lizzy McAlpine

from the album The Show
- Released: 27 October 2023
- Length: 3:20; 3:14 (duet version)
- Label: Capitol
- Songwriters: Niall Horan; Joel Little; John Ryan; Julian Bunetta; Mark Landon; Ruel Vincent van Dijk
- Producers: Little; Ryan; Bunetta

Niall Horan singles chronology
"Meltdown" (2023)	"You Could Start a Cult" (2023)	"Drive Safe" (2026)

Lizzy McAlpine singles chronology
"Call Your Mom" (2023)	"You Could Start a Cult" (2023)	"Older" (2024)

"You Could Start a Cult" is a song by Irish singer-songwriter Niall Horan, included on his third studio album The Show, released through Capitol Records on 9 June 2023. The song was written by Horan, Mark Landon, Ruel Vincent van Dijk, and its producers Joel Little, John Ryan, and Julian Bunetta. A duet version of the song, with American singer-songwriter Lizzy McAlpine, was released on 27 October 2023, as the lead single from the album's expanded edition, subtitled The Encore.

== Background ==
Earlier in 2023, Niall Horan performed Lizzy McAlpine's breakthrough song "Ceilings" during his BBC Radio 1 Live Lounge set. While announcing the duet version and the deluxe edition of his album, Horan stated about McAlpine: "I've been a huge fan of hers for a while now and am so grateful she was able to hop on the song and write a special new verse."

== Composition ==
"You Could Start a Cult" was described by People as a "delicate love ballad".

== Live performance ==
Published on 9 June 2023, Horan performed the song at the SiriusXM Studios for the Hits 1 Celebrity Session series. The official Vevo Live performance of the solo version of the song was released on 16 June 2023.

== Charts ==
Chart performance for "You Could Start a Cult"
Chart (2023)	Peak position
New Zealand Hot Singles (RMNZ)	22
