= Put a Little Love on Me =

Single by Niall Horan

from the album Heartbreak Weather
- Released: 6 December 2019
- Length: 3:44
- Label: Capitol
- Songwriters: Niall Horan; Dan Bryer; Mike Needle; Jamie Scott
- Producers: Jamie Scott; Daniel Bryer

Niall Horan singles chronology
"Nice to Meet Ya" (2019)	"Put a Little Love on Me" (2019)	"No Judgement" (2020)

Music video
- "Put a Little Love on Me" on YouTube

"Put a Little Love on Me" is a song by Irish singer Niall Horan. It was released through Capitol Records as the second single from his second studio album Heartbreak Weather on 6 December 2019.

== Background and promotion ==
Horan first performed the song on 7 August 2019 at the Capitol Congress 2019, where he also announced his previous single "Nice to Meet Ya". About the song, the singer revealed that his upcoming project would not be his album "if it didn't have a sad, sad, sad ballad on it" and that the song "could potentially be my favorite song I've ever written". Lyrically, the song reportedly deals with the break-up with singer Hailee Steinfeld in December 2018. He announced the release of the song and shared a snippet on his social media on 5 December 2019.

== Live performances ==
On December 15, 2019, Horan performed the song for the first time on Saturday Night Live. On March 10, 2020, Horan performed the song on The Late Late Show with James Corden.

== Critical reception ==
Mike Wass of Idolator called the song the Irish star's best ballad since "This Town", particularly complimenting "the lovely chorus" and his decision to go back "to the stripped-back sound palette of Flicker. Madeline Roth, writing for MTV, described the song as a "heartbreaking ballad" while writing that Horan "managed to completely tug at our heartstrings with this one".

== Charts ==
Chart (2019)	Peak position
Canadian Hot Digital Song Sales (Billboard)	28
Ireland (IRMA)	32
Netherlands (Dutch Top 40 Tiparade)	18
New Zealand Hot Singles (RMNZ)	15
Scottish Singles Sales (Official Charts)	38
UK Singles Downloads (Official Charts)	50
US Digital Song Sales (Billboard)	9

== Certifications ==
Region	Certification	Certified units/sales
Brazil (Pro-Música Brasil)	Platinum	40,000^{‡}
Canada (Music Canada)	Platinum	80,000^{‡}
Denmark (IFPI Danmark)	Gold	45,000^{‡}
New Zealand (RMNZ)	Gold	15,000^{‡}
Portugal (AFP)	Gold	5,000^{‡}
Spain (Promusicae)	Gold	30,000^{‡}
United Kingdom (BPI)	Silver	200,000^{‡}
^{‡} Sales+streaming figures based on certification alone.
