= Nice to Meet Ya (Niall Horan song) =

2019 single by Niall Horan

Single by Niall Horan

from the album Heartbreak Weather
- Released: 4 October 2019
- Genre: Pop rock; Britpop; rock; soft rock
- Length: 2:38
- Label: Capitol
- Songwriters: Niall Horan; Ruth-Anne Cunningham; Tobias Jesso Jr.; Julian Bunetta
- Producer: Julian Bunetta

Niall Horan singles chronology
"What a Time" (2019)	"Nice to Meet Ya" (2019)	"Put a Little Love on Me" (2019)

Music video
- "Nice to Meet Ya" on YouTube

"Nice to Meet Ya" is a song by Irish singer Niall Horan, released through Capitol Records as the lead single from his second studio album Heartbreak Weather on 4 October 2019. Horan co-wrote the track with Ruth-Anne Cunningham in one day.

== Background ==
In June 2019, Horan told fans that they would hear new music from him by the end of the year. In early September, he posted online that he was "listening to songs from my new record and I'm so excited to get going". Co-writer Ruth-Anne Cunningham, whom Horan worked with on the song "Slow Hands", said the track gives her "2000s rock, Kasabian/Arctic Monkeys vibes".

== Composition ==
According to the sheet music published at musicnotes.com, the song is written in the key of E minor.

== Live performances ==
On 3 November 2019, Horan performed the song for the first time at the 2019 MTV Europe Music Awards. On 15 December 2019, Horan performed the song on Saturday Night Live. On 9 March 2020, Horan performed the song on The Late Late Show with James Corden.

== Critical reception ==
From the snippet posted to Instagram, Mike Wass of Idolator stated that the track "sounds like a stomping, upbeat anthem". Brittany Spanos of Rolling Stone described the song as "alluring" while complimenting the "urgent piano riff that builds up to include hand-claps, a sturdy bass line and the rest of his dynamic full band".

== Track listing ==
Digital download
No.	Title	Length
1.	"Nice to Meet Ya"	2:38

Digital download – Stripped Version
No.	Title	Length
1.	"Nice to Meet Ya" (Stripped Version)	2:42

Digital download – Diplo Remix
No.	Title	Length
1.	"Nice to Meet Ya" (Diplo Remix)	3:35

== Charts ==
=== Weekly charts ===
Chart (2019–2020)	Peak position
Australia (ARIA)	60
Belgium (Ultratop 50 Flanders)	30
Belgium (Ultratip Bubbling Under Wallonia)	3
Canada Hot 100 (Billboard)	55
Croatia (HRT)	99
Czech Republic Airplay (ČNS IFPI)	5
Czech Republic Singles Digital (ČNS IFPI)	48
Ireland (IRMA)	7
Lithuania (AGATA)	25
Mexico Airplay (Billboard)	29
Netherlands (Dutch Top 40)	25
Netherlands (Single Top 100)	34
New Zealand Hot Singles (RMNZ)	7
Romania (Airplay 100)	28
Scotland Singles (OCC)	9
Slovakia Airplay (ČNS IFPI)	75
Slovakia Singles Digital (ČNS IFPI)	40
Sweden Heatseeker (Sverigetopplistan)	20
Switzerland (Schweizer Hitparade)	95
UK Singles (OCC)	22
US Billboard Hot 100	63
US Adult Contemporary (Billboard)	26
US Adult Pop Airplay (Billboard)	14
US Dance/Mix Show Airplay (Billboard)	38
US Pop Airplay (Billboard)	19

=== Year-end charts ===
Chart (2020)	Position
US Adult Top 40 (Billboard)	50

== Certifications ==
Region	Certification	Certified units/sales
Australia (ARIA)	2× Platinum	140,000^{‡}
Austria (IFPI Austria)	Gold	15,000^{‡}
Canada (Music Canada)	2× Platinum	160,000^{‡}
New Zealand (RMNZ)	Platinum	30,000^{‡}
Poland (ZPAV)	Gold	25,000^{‡}
United Kingdom (BPI)	Platinum	600,000^{‡}
^{‡} Sales+streaming figures based on certification alone.

== Release history ==
Region	Date	Format	Version	Label	Ref.
Various	4 October 2019	Digital download; streaming	Original	Capitol	
Australia	4 October 2019	Contemporary hit radio	Original	Capitol; EMI	
United States	8 October 2019	Top 40 radio	Original	Capitol	
Italy	11 October 2019	Contemporary hit radio	Original	Universal	
United States	14 October 2019	Hot adult contemporary	Original	Capitol	
Various	25 October 2019	Digital download; streaming	Stripped Version	Capitol	
Various	7 November 2019	Digital download; streaming	Diplo Remix	Capitol	
Italy	15 November 2019	Contemporary hit radio	Diplo Remix	Universal	
