= Flicker Sessions =

2017 concert tour by Niall Horan

- Tour by Niall Horan
- Promotional handbill for the tour
- Location: Europe • Asia • Oceania • North America • South America
- Associated album: Flicker
- Start date: 29 August 2017
- End date: 22 November 2017
- Legs: 3
- No. of shows: 20

Niall Horan concert chronology
- Flicker Sessions (2017); Flicker World Tour (2018)

The Flicker Sessions was the debut concert tour by Irish singer-songwriter, Niall Horan. The tour supported his first studio album, Flicker (2017). Performing in theatres, the tour played 20 shows in Europe, Australia, Asia and the Americas.

== Background ==
In September 2016, it was announced that Horan had signed a solo recording contract with Capitol Records. Horan released two singles, "This Town" and "Slow Hands" prior to releasing his debut album in October 2017.

The tour was officially announced on 10 July 2017 via Horan's social media accounts and website. In North America, pre-sale tickets were made available via Ticketmaster's Verified Fan platform. Many shows were sold-out, leaving fans upset with the limited number of shows and the small venues. The singer responded to fans on social media that the 2017 shows were just the beginning. His 2018 tour was announced in September 2017.

== Critical reception ==
The tour received favourable reviews from critics. Harry Guerin of RTÉ writes Horan gave a "polished performance" for the debut concert in Dublin. He continues: "With his well-drilled band already sounding like months on the road, his skills as a balladeer were impressive throughout. Upcoming Maren Morris duet "Seeing Blind" and the Fleetwood Mac-inspired "Since We're Alone" showed that the masses have yet to hear his classiest songs, while the man himself contended that the record's title track is the best thing he has written to date. He won't be alone in that opinion, either." Rick Pearson from the London Evening Standard gave the show in London three out of five stars. He states: "[W]ith an electric guitar he did a fine job of recreating the Eighties driving rock of Don Henley on "Since We're Alone", while his acoustic version of Fool's Gold was far more affecting than the 1D original. "Slow Hands" sent the crowd into delirium, Horan sounding like a pop star who might yet give Messrs Styles and Malik a run for their money."

For AXS, Marianne Meyer states the concert in Philadelphia was a "crowd pleaser". She goes on to say: "Horan gave the ladies just what they came for – a talented, charismatic onstage boyfriend who repeatedly thanked them for their support, cared that they were all having a good time, even apologized to those watching from the side balconies because he didn't directly face them as he sang." In Silver Springs, Mareesha Galibs of The Hoya recalls the concert as "stellar". She says: "Horan is no longer performing alongside his bandmates, but if the Washington, D.C. stop on his tour is any indication, Horan is ready to make his mark on the world—all on his own."

The show in Dallas was remarked as "stellar" by Preston Jones of the Dallas Observer. He writes: "It's a savvy creative choice, showcasing Horan's clear, light tenor voice, which stands firmly on its own and can adapt to whatever genres the singer-songwriter wants to explore. No one will mistake Horan's work for that of his fellow countrymen Glen Hansard and Van Morrison, but that tradition of iconoclastic troubadours isn't what Horan's current audience is after anyway."

== Opening acts ==
- Gavin James (North America, select dates)
- Wild Youth (Dublin)
- Picture This (London, Stockholm)
- Corey Harper (Lake Buena Vista, Atlanta)

== Setlist ==
The following setlist was obtained from the concert held 3 September 2017, at the Annexet in Stockholm, Sweden. It does not represent all concerts for the duration of the tour.

1. "The Tide"
2. "Seeing Blind"
3. "This Town"
4. "Paper Houses"
5. "You and Me"
6. "Fire Away"
7. "Flicker"
8. "Too Much to Ask"
9. "Since We're Alone"
10. "Mirrors"
11. "On the Loose"

Encore

12. "Fool's Gold"
13. "Slow Hands"
14. "On My Own"

Notes

- During the show in Boston, Horan and the band performed a mashup of “On My Own” and Dropkick Murphys’ “I'm Shipping to Boston”.
- During the last two shows in Phoenix and San Francisco, a cover of Bruce Springsteen's "Dancing in the Dark" was performed alongside opening act Gavin James.

== Tour dates ==
Date	City	Country	Venue
Europe
29 August 2017	Dublin	Ireland	Olympia Theatre
31 August 2017	London	England	O_{2} Shepherd's Bush Empire
3 September 2017	Stockholm	Sweden	Annexet
Oceania
10 September 2017	Sydney	Australia	Enmore Theatre
Asia
14 September 2017	Tokyo	Japan	Ex Theater Roppongi
North America
19 September 2017	Los Angeles	United States	Hollywood Palladium
South America
1 October 2017	Rio de Janeiro	Brazil	Vivo Rio
North America
29 October 2017	Philadelphia	United States	The Fillmore Philadelphia
31 October 2017	New York City	United States	Beacon Theatre
1 November 2017	Toronto	Canada	Massey Hall
3 November 2017	Boston	United States	Orpheum Theatre
4 November 2017	Silver Spring	United States	The Fillmore Silver Spring
6 November 2017	Miami Beach	United States	The Fillmore Miami Beach
9 November 2017	Lake Buena Vista	United States	House of Blues
10 November 2017	Atlanta	United States	Tabernacle
13 November 2017	Nashville	United States	Ryman Auditorium
15 November 2017	Rosemont	United States	Rosemont Theatre
17 November 2017	Dallas	United States	South Side Ballroom
20 November 2017	Phoenix	United States	Comerica Theatre
22 November 2017	San Francisco	United States	SF Masonic Auditorium

Cancellations and rescheduled shows

26 September 2017	Mexico City, Mexico	El Plaza Condesa	Cancelled

=== Box office score data ===
Venue	City	Tickets sold / Available	Gross revenue
Hollywood Palladium	Los Angeles	3,665 / 3,868 (95%)	$137,438
Beacon Theatre	New York City	2,766 / 2,766 (100%)	$170,117
TOTAL		6,431 / 6,634 (97%)	$307,555
