= Flicker World Tour =

2018 concert tour by Niall Horan

- Tour by Niall Horan
- Location: Asia; Europe; Latin America; Oceania; South America
- Associated album: Flicker
- Start date: 10 March 2018
- End date: 30 September 2018
- Legs: 5
- No. of shows: 82
- Attendance: 460,743
- Box office: $24.7 million

Niall Horan concert chronology
- Flicker Sessions (2017); Flicker World Tour (2018); The Show: Live on Tour (2024)

The Flicker World Tour was the second concert tour by Irish singer Niall Horan, in support of his debut album Flicker (2017). The tour began on 10 March 2018 in Killarney, County Kerry. The tour then visited Oceania, Asia, Latin America, and North America where it concluded on 23 September 2018 in West Palm Beach, Florida.

== Background ==
On 7 September 2017, Horan officially announced via his Instagram and Twitter accounts that the first dates of the Flicker World Tour would be in Australia and New Zealand. Music Feeds reported: "Horan’s debut arena tour will hit Australia in June, and will see the singer-songwriter play tracks like "This Town" and "Slow Hands", as well as songs from his upcoming debut album. The tour will be supported by American singer-songwriter Maren Morris."

Dates for US and Canada were announced on 15 September 2017, along with the news that Maren Morris would be joining him as the opening act. The tour announcement followed the reveal of the cover of his debut album Flicker (2017) and its release date, 20 October 2017. Tickets for the North American shows went on sale on 22 September 2017. Horan added Latin American tour dates to the Flicker World Tour on 2 October 2017.

The European dates of the tour were announced on 6 October 2017 and Julia Michaels was announced as the opening act for that leg of the tour. The Belfast Telegraph reported: "Niall will kick off his 2018 tour at the 3Arena in Dublin on March 12. His other European dates include London, Manchester, Berlin and Amsterdam." Horan later added a second date to his show in Dublin at 3Arena after the first show sold out quickly. On 26 October 2017, Horan announced the last dates of the tour which included shows in the Philippines, Singapore and Japan.

== Critical reception ==
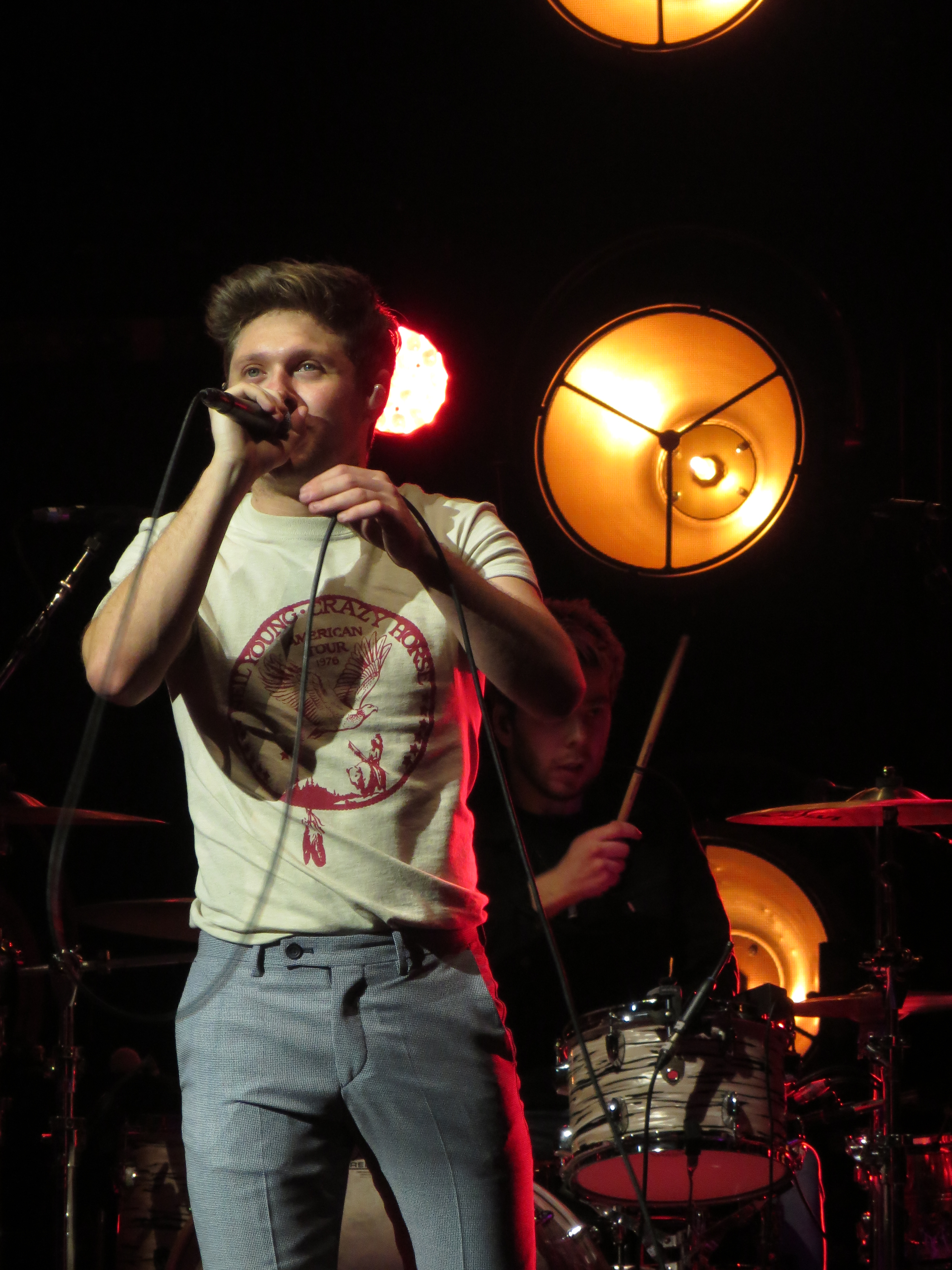
Niall performing "Slow Hands" in Glasgow

The Flicker World Tour has received a fair amount of positive reviews from critics. Stacey Mullen of the Evening Times wrote about Horan's potential for a lasting career and talked about how his sound as a solo artist was different from the music made by his former band One Direction. She wrote: "While music fans expected a similar sound to the manufactured pop the band was renown for, Niall Horan went in his own direction and put on a show at the SEC’s Clyde Armadillo on Sunday night which proved he is a true artist whose early catalogue shows promise of longevity." For a review of Horan's concert at the Spark Arena, Rose Riddell of Coup De Main Magazine noted that Horan looked to be at home on stage and that he was "made for touring". She continued on to say: "After his first cover of the night - a folksy rendition of Bruce Springsteen's "Dancing in the Dark", Horan brought out opening act Maren Morris to perform their duet "Seeing Blind", where their voices together live sounded just as good as on the record. An acoustic rendition of "Fool's Gold" saw the audience in awe of Horan, and "Fire Away" was an absolute set highlight - highlighting the total togetherness and musicianship of the live band."

In a review for The Independent, Roisin O'Connor stated, "Outside of that first solo, though, he’s an adept – and clearly improving – songwriter who seemed to require fewer co-writes than most major pop artists: his album’s title track is sensitive and endearingly romantic," giving the show in London 4 out of 5 stars. Matilda Elgood for Beat Magazine wrote, "Horan started the show gently, with "On the Loose", swiftly moving into crowd favourite "This Town". Horan has confidently distinguished himself away from the classic boy band sound of One Direction. And even though there was widespread doubt about the boys forging their own careers, Horan has successfully paved the way with his country flare." In his review for the show at the Brisbane Entertainment Centre, Matt Oberhardt of The Courier-Mail touched on Horan's showmanship and musicianship: "He played guitar for most of the concert and showed his musical versatility by even jumping on the piano for "So Long" (a previously unreleased song he has reworked for the tour)." Oberhardt added, "Fans had to wait until the encore for his biggest hit, but they were treated to a polished performance before that showcasing Horan’s strong vocals and clear stage presence."

== Setlist ==
The following set list was obtained from the concert held on 18 July 2018 in Woodlands, Texas. It does not represent all concerts for the duration of the tour, but is a representation of the latest North America leg.

1. "On the Loose"
2. "The Tide"
3. "This Town"
4. "Paper Houses"
5. "You and Me"
6. "Dancing in the Dark" (Bruce Springsteen cover)
7. "Seeing Blind" (with Maren Morris)
8. "Flicker"
9. "Fool's Gold" (One Direction cover)
10. "Too Much to Ask"
11. "So Long"
12. "Since We're Alone"
13. "Fire Away"
14. "Finally Free"
15. "On My Own"

Encore

16. "Drag Me Down" (One Direction cover)
17. "Slow Hands"
18. "Mirrors"

Notes

- During the first show in Dublin, Horan covered Thin Lizzy's "Dancing in the Moonlight (It's Caught Me in Its Spotlight)" and performed “Seeing Blind” with Ruth Anne Cunningham.
- During the second show in Dublin, a cover of U2's "Where the Streets Have No Name" was performed.
- During the show in Bristow, a cover of Tom Petty's "I Won't Back Down" was performed.
- Prior to the Oceania leg, "Mirrors" and "On My Own" were switched.
- Prior to the North American leg, a cover of Camila Cabello's "Crying in the Club" was in the place of "Finally Free".
- Horan performed Billy Joel's "New York State of Mind" at the Wantagh, New York show.
- For the last 6 shows of the North American leg, Horan sang Eagles' "Life in the Fast Lane"

== Tour dates ==
List of concerts, showing date, city, country, venue, tickets sold, number of available tickets and amount of gross revenue.
Date	City	Country	Venue	Opening acts	Attendance	Revenue
Europe
10 March 2018	Killarney	Ireland	INEC Killarney	Wild Youth	3,891 / 3,891	$218,574
12 March 2018	Dublin	Ireland	3Arena	Julia Michaels	22,874 / 22,874	$1,270,307
13 March 2018	Belfast	Northern Ireland	SSE Arena	Julia Michaels	9,904 / 9,904	$562,040
15 March 2018	Manchester	England	O_{2} Apollo	Julia Michaels	6,712 / 6,780	$333,677
16 March 2018	Manchester	England	O_{2} Apollo	Julia Michaels	6,712 / 6,780	$333,677
18 March 2018	Glasgow	Scotland	SEC Armadillo	Julia Michaels; Lewis Capaldi	5,765 / 5,770	$302,911
19 March 2018	Glasgow	Scotland	SEC Armadillo	Julia Michaels; Lewis Capaldi	5,765 / 5,770	$302,911
22 March 2018	London	England	O_{2} Brixton Academy	Julia Michaels	4,921 / 4,921	$263,237
24 March 2018	Cardiff	Wales	Motorpoint Arena	Julia Michaels	4,540 / 4,540	$237,262
26 March 2018	Bournemouth	England	Windsor Hall	Julia Michaels	4,072 / 4,072	$200,365
27 March 2018	Brighton	England	Brighton Centre	Julia Michaels	3,620 / 3,620	$181,074
29 March 2018	Dublin	Ireland	3Arena	Julia Michaels	^{[b]}	^{[b]}
18 April 2018	Paris	France	Zénith Paris	Julia Michaels	5,838 / 5,838	$367,002
19 April 2018	Cologne	Germany	Palladium	Julia Michaels	3,995 / 4,000	$268,702
21 April 2018	Berlin	Germany	Tempodrom	Julia Michaels	3,154 / 3,549	$208,092
22 April 2018	Copenhagen	Denmark	Store Vega	Julia Michaels	1,550 / 1,550	$154,280
24 April 2018	Oslo	Norway	Sentrum Scene	Julia Michaels	1,500 / 1,500	$144,063
25 April 2018	Stockholm	Sweden	Fryshuset Arenan	Julia Michaels	2,390 / 3,400	$188,988
27 April 2018	Hamburg	Germany	Mehr!-Theater am Großmarkt	Julia Michaels	3,260 / 3,267	$223,977
28 April 2018	Amsterdam	Netherlands	AFAS Live	Julia Michaels	6,000 / 6,000	$295,697
30 April 2018	Brussels	Belgium	Forest National	Julia Michaels	7,398 / 8,000	$335,474
1 May 2018	Munich	Germany	TonHalle	Julia Michaels	2,100 / 2,100	$176,360
3 May 2018	Zürich	Switzerland	Halle 622	Julia Michaels	3,460 / 3,460	$214,495
4 May 2018	Vienna	Austria	Planet.tt Bank Austria Halle	Julia Michaels	3,358 / 3,365	$228,913
6 May 2018	Bologna	Italy	Unipol Arena	Julia Michaels	7,242 / 7,242	$456,387
7 May 2018	Milan	Italy	Mediolanum Forum	Julia Michaels	8,494 / 8,494	$520,046
9 May 2018	Barcelona	Spain	Razzmatazz	Julia Michaels	2,045 / 2,045	$148,460
11 May 2018	Madrid	Spain	La Riviera	Julia Michaels	1,765 / 1,765	$134,908
12 May 2018	Lisbon	Portugal	Coliseu dos Recreios	Julia Michaels	3,705 / 3,705	$234,646
Oceania
1 June 2018	Auckland	New Zealand	Spark Arena	Maren Morris	3,049 / 3,600	$181,001
3 June 2018	Brisbane	Australia	Brisbane Entertainment Centre	Maren Morris	4,550 / 4,550	$382,923
5 June 2018	Sydney	Australia	Qudos Bank Arena	Maren Morris	7,462 / 8,000	$569,557
7 June 2018	Melbourne	Australia	Margaret Court Arena	Maren Morris	5,434 / 5,500	$429,432
Asia
10 June 2018	Pasay	Philippines	Mall of Asia Arena	Jayda	5,202 / 5,776	$10,306
12 June 2018	Singapore		The Star Performing Arts Centre	Ming Bridges	2,577 / 4,547	$251,999
14 June 2018	Tokyo	Japan	Zepp DiverCity	sugar me	2,400 / 2,400	$208,711
15 June 2018	Tokyo	Japan	Shinkiba Studio Coast	sugar me	2,602 / 2,602	$227,415
Latin America
4 July 2018	Santiago	Chile	Movistar Arena	Maren Morris	5,230 / 5,812	$435,308
6 July 2018	Buenos Aires	Argentina	Estadio Luna Park	Maren Morris	8,036 / 8,036	$484,405
8 July 2018	Rio de Janeiro	Brazil	KM de Vantagens Hall	Maren Morris	3,264 / 5,412	$164,699
10 July 2018	São Paulo	Brazil	Espaco das Américas	Maren Morris	6,207 / 7,350	$348,497
13 July 2018	Mexico City	Mexico	Pepsi Center WTC	Maren Morris	14,392 / 15,472	$711,208
14 July 2018	Mexico City	Mexico	Pepsi Center WTC	Maren Morris	14,392 / 15,472	$711,208
North America
18 July 2018	The Woodlands	United States	Cynthia Woods Mitchell Pavilion	Maren Morris	6,982 / 14,115	$330,992
20 July 2018	Dallas	United States	Starplex Pavilion	Maren Morris	7,883 / 18,917	$350,315
21 July 2018	Rogers	United States	Walmart Arkansas Music Pavilion	Maren Morris	8,366 / 9,536	$314,823
23 July 2018	Nashville	United States	Ascend Amphitheater	Maren Morris	6,490 / 6,833	$295,283
25 July 2018	Cincinnati	United States	Riverbend Music Center	Maren Morris	8,267 / 8,886	$391,412
26 July 2018	Tinley Park	United States	Hollywood Casino Amphitheatre	Maren Morris	9,288 / 26,866	$459,853
28 July 2018	Tulsa	United States	BOK Center	Maren Morris	6,187 / 7,897	$354,192
30 July 2018	West Valley City	United States	USANA Amphitheatre	Maren Morris	9,362 / 20,000	$318,120
31 July 2018	Nampa	United States	Ford Amphitheater	Maren Morris	3,839 / 4,044	$192,670
2 August 2018	Auburn	United States	White River Amphitheatre	Maren Morris	6,613 / 16,000	$266,081
4 August 2018	Mountain View	United States	Shoreline Amphitheatre	Maren Morris	8,569 / 19,901	$341,042
5 August 2018	Irvine	United States	FivePoint Amphitheatre	Maren Morris	7,905 / 10,100	$413,512
7 August 2018	Los Angeles	United States	Greek Theatre	Maren Morris	10,651 / 11,740	$607,995
8 August 2018	Los Angeles	United States	Greek Theatre	Maren Morris	10,651 / 11,740	$607,995
17 August 2018	Chula Vista	United States	Mattress Firm Amphitheatre	Maren Morris	4,802 / 18,173	$242,662
18 August 2018	Las Vegas	United States	Pearl Concert Theater	Maren Morris	2,236 / 2,236	$176,472
20 August 2018	Morrison	United States	Red Rocks Amphitheatre	Maren Morris	7,941 / 9,525	$533,654
22 August 2018	Kansas City	United States	Starlight Theatre	Maren Morris	4,275 / 6,901	$301,383
23 August 2018	Falcon Heights	United States	Minnesota State Fair Grandstand	Maren Morris	9,175 / 9,175	$512,155
25 August 2018	Maryland Heights	United States	Hollywood Casino Amphitheatre	Maren Morris	6,243 / 19,000	$239,954
26 August 2018	Noblesville	United States	Ruoff Home Mortgage Music Center	Maren Morris	6,982 / 21,385	$290,137
28 August 2018	Clarkston	United States	DTE Energy Music Theatre	Maren Morris	8,132 / 14,629	$373,625
29 August 2018	Cuyahoga Falls	United States	Blossom Music Center	Maren Morris	6,396 / 7,576	$271,189
31 August 2018	Bristow	United States	Jiffy Lube Live	Maren Morris	7,851 / 20,442	$384,937
2 September 2018	Allentown	United States	Allentown Fairgrounds Grandstand	Maren Morris	5,202 / 5,202	$293,618
3 September 2018	Syracuse	United States	Chevy Court	Maren Morris	—	—
5 September 2018	Toronto	Canada	Budweiser Stage	Maren Morris	10,309 / 13,000	$537,863
7 September 2018	Darien	United States	Darien Lake Performing Arts Center	Maren Morris	5,251 / 20,359	$263,858
8 September 2018	Mansfield	United States	Xfinity Center	Maren Morris	9,222 / 11,000	$532,448
11 September 2018	Camden	United States	BB&T Pavilion	Maren Morris	5,208 / 21,367	$251,171
12 September 2018	Wantagh	United States	Jones Beach Theater	Maren Morris	7,109 / 13,215	$375,124
14 September 2018	Hartford	United States	Xfinity Theatre	Maren Morris	5,845 / 22,501	$257,779
15 September 2018	Holmdel	United States	PNC Bank Arts Center	Maren Morris	15,610 / 16,806	$771,159
19 September 2018	Charlotte	United States	PNC Music Pavilion	Maren Morris	5,349 / 13,440	$254,514
20 September 2018	Alpharetta	United States	Verizon Wireless Amphitheatre	Maren Morris	7,168 / 10,923	$309,258
22 September 2018	Tampa	United States	MidFlorida Credit Union Amphitheatre	Maren Morris	6,980 / 18,339	$300,513
23 September 2018	West Palm Beach	United States	Coral Sky Amphitheatre	Maren Morris	4,638 / 16,873	$191,674
30 September 2018	Raleigh	United States	Coastal Credit Union Music Park	—N/a	4,459 / 18,812	$166,097
Total					460,743 / 720,423	$24,742,932

== Notes ==
^{b} The score data is representative of the two shows at 3arena on 12, 29 March respectively.

== Cancelled shows ==
Date	City	Country	Venue	Reason
17 September 2018	Raleigh	United States	Coastal Credit Union Music Park	Hurricane Florence
