= List of awards and nominations received by Niall Horan =

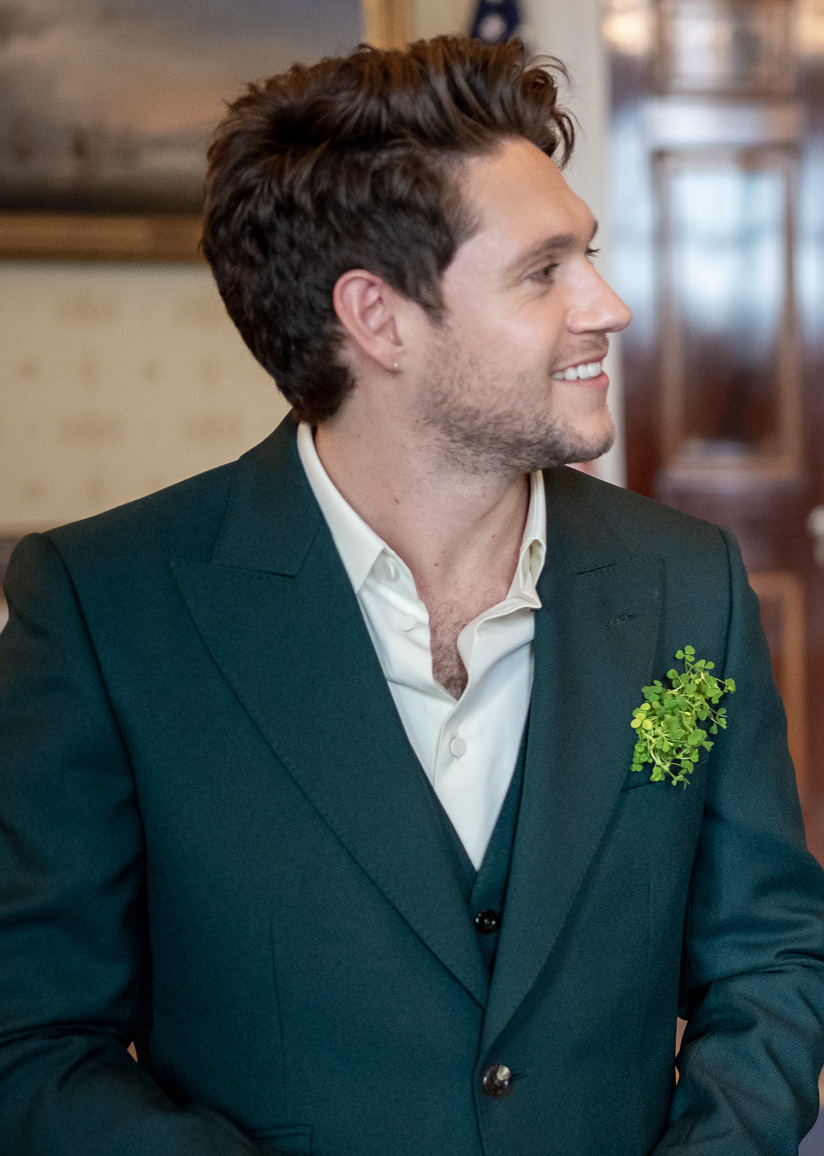
Horan at the White House in 2023

Irish singer-songwriter Niall Horan has received 19 awards and 36 nominations. Among them, he has won an American Music Award, and multiple BMI and iHeartRadio Awards.

== American Music Awards ==
Year	Nominee / work	Award	Result	Ref.
2017	Himself	New Artist of the Year	Won	

== BMI Awards ==
=== BMI London Awards ===
Year	Nominee / work	Award	Result	Ref.
2016	"Night Changes"	Pop Award Songs	Won	
2017	"This Town"	Pop Award Songs	Won	
2018	"Slow Hands"	Pop Award Songs	Won	
2019	"Too Much to Ask"	Pop Award Songs	Won	
2019	"On the Loose"	Pop Award Songs	Won	
2020	"Nice to Meet Ya"	Pop Award Songs	Won	
2021	"Moral of the Story"	Pop Award Songs	Won	

=== BMI Pop Awards ===
Year	Nominee / work	Award	Result	Ref.
2018	"Slow Hands"	Award-Winning Songs	Won	
2018	"This Town"	Award-Winning Songs	Won	

== Choice Music Prize ==
Year	Nominee / work	Award	Result	Ref.
2017	”This Town”	Song of the Year	Nominated	
2018	”Slow Hands”	Song of the Year	Nominated	
2021	”No Judgement”	Song of the Year	Won	
2024	"Heaven"	Song of the Year	Pending	

== Global Awards ==
Year	Nominee / work	Award	Result	Ref.
2018	"Slow Hands"	Best Song	Nominated	
2018	Himself	Best Male	Nominated	
2018	Himself	Best Pop	Nominated	

== iHeartRadio Awards ==
=== iHeartRadio Music Awards ===
Year	Nominee / work	Award	Result	Ref.
2017	Himself	Best Solo Breakout	Nominated	
2018	Himself	Best New Pop Artist	Won	
2018	Himself	Best New Artist	Nominated	
2018	Himself	Best Solo Breakout	Nominated	
2018	"Slow Hands"	Best Lyrics	Won	
2018	"Issues"	Best Cover Song	Nominated	
2019	"Crying in the Club"	Best Cover Song	Nominated	

=== iHeartRadio Titanium Awards ===
iHeartRadio Titanium Awards are awarded to an artist when their song reaches 1 Billion Spins across iHeartRadio Stations.

Year	Nominee/Work		Result	Ref
2017	"Slow Hands"	1 Billion Total Audience Spins on iHeartRadio Stations	Won	

=== iHeartRadio MuchMusic Video Awards ===
Year	Nominee / work	Award	Result	Ref.
2017	Himself	Fan Fave International Artist or Group	Won	

== People's Choice Awards ==
Year	Nominee / work	Award	Result	Ref.
2017	Himself	Favourite Breakout Artist	Won	

== Radio Disney Music Awards ==
Year	Nominee / work	Award	Result	Ref.
2017	Himself	Best Male Artist	Won	

== Rolling Stone UK Awards ==
Year	Nominee / work	Award	Result	Ref.
2023	The Show	The Album Award	Nominated	

== Teen Choice Awards ==
Year	Nominee / work	Award	Result	Ref.
2017	"Slow Hands"	Choice Song: Male Artist	Won	
2017	Himself	Choice Summer Male Artist	Nominated	
2018	Himself	Choice Male Artist	Nominated	
2018	Himself	Choice Summer Male Artist	Nominated	
2018	Flicker World Tour	Choice Summer Tour	Nominated	
2019	"What a Time"	Choice Collaboration	Nominated	

== TeleHit Awards ==
Year	Nominee / work	Award	Result	Ref.
2017	"Slow Hands"	Video in English	Won	

== Hollywood Music in Media Awards ==
Year	Nominee / work	Award	Result	Ref.
2018	"Finally Free"	Original Song – Animated Film	Nominated	
