= Flicker: Featuring the RTÉ Concert Orchestra =

Live album (Flicker) by Niall Horan featuring the RTÉ Concert Orchestra
- Released: 7 December 2018
- Recorded: April 2018
- Venues: Unnamed venue (Dublin, Ireland)
- Length: 33:27
- Labels: Universal Ireland; Virgin EMI; Capitol
- Director: Seán Barry
- Producer: Horan

Niall Horan chronology
Mirrors (2018)	Flicker: Featuring the RTÉ Concert Orchestra (2018)	Spotify Singles (2020)

RTÉ Concert Orchestra chronology
Lúnasa with the RTÉ Concert Orchestra (2011)	Flicker: Featuring the RTÉ Concert Orchestra (2018)

Flicker: Featuring the RTÉ Concert Orchestra is the debut live album from Irish singer-songwriter Niall Horan, in collaboration with Irish orchestral collective RTÉ Concert Orchestra, released on 7 December 2018 by Universal Ireland, Virgin EMI and Capitol Records. It was recorded at a venue in Dublin, Ireland, as a live edition of Horan's debut studio album, Flicker (2018).

Flicker: Featuring the RTÉ Concert Orchestra peaked at number 12 on the Irish Albums Chart, number 40 on the Australian Digital Albums Chart, and number 3 on the US Top Classical Albums Chart. An exclusive re-release on 12" vinyl for Record Store Day 2026 saw the album debut at number 28 on the Dutch Albums Chart.

== Background ==
In April 2018, Horan and the RTÉ Concert Orchestra recorded songs from Horan's debut studio album Flicker (2018). The recording formed the basis of a one-off television special which was broadcast in early 2018.

== Critical reception ==
Professional ratings
Review scores
Source	Rating
The Irish Times	4/5 stars

Louise Bruton of the Irish Times gave the album four stars: "Cleared of overproduction and an overly soft rock touch, [Horan's] voice is more confident and it takes the leads as the orchestra complements his songs".

== Track listing ==
Flicker: Featuring the RTÉ Concert Orchestra track listing
No.	Title	Length
1.	"The Tide"	3:27
2.	"This Town"	3:52
3.	"Too Much to Ask"	3:41
4.	"Paper Houses"	3:33
5.	"You and Me"	3:13
6.	"Seeing Blind"	3:07
7.	"Fire Away"	4:44
8.	"So Long"	3:37
9.	"Flicker"	4:13
Total length:		33:27

== Personnel ==
Adapted from the album's liner notes.

- Niall Horan – writing, vocals, guitar, piano, production (all tracks)
- RTÉ Concert Orchestra – orchestra (all tracks)

=== Other musicians ===
- John Bird – bass, backing vocals (all tracks)
- Gavin Murphy – conducting (all tracks)
- Hayden Miller – design, layout (all tracks)
- Alex Torjussen – drums, backing vocals (all tracks)
- Jake Curran – guitar, backing vocals (all tracks)
- Bróna Cahill – orchestra leader (all tracks)
- Seán Barry – music director (all tracks)
- Louis Querelle – piano, backing vocals (all tracks)
- Connor Masterson – violin, backing vocals (all tracks)

=== Writing ===
- John Ryan (1, 7, 9)
- Julian Bunetta (1, 7, 9)
- Daniel Bryer (2)
- Mike Needle (2)
- Jamie Scott (2–3)
- Iain Archer (4)
- Matthew Smith Radosevich (5–6)
- Ruth-Anne Cunningham (5–7)
- Ben Kohn (8)
- Ed Drewett (8)
- Peter Kelleher (8)
- Tom Barnes (8)

=== Technical ===
- Robert Vosgien – mastering
- Damian Chennells – recording, mixing

== Charts ==
2018–2019 chart history for Flicker: Featuring the RTÉ Concert Orchestra
Chart (2018–2019)	Peak position
Australian Digital Albums (ARIA)	40
Irish Albums (IRMA)	12
US Top Classical Albums (Billboard)	3

2026 chart history for Flicker: Featuring the RTÉ Concert Orchestra
Chart (2026)	Peak position
Dutch Albums (Album Top 100)	28

== Release history ==
Flicker: Featuring the RTÉ Concert Orchestra release history and formats
Region	Date	Format	Label	Ref.
Ireland; Europe	7 December 2018	CD	Universal Ireland; Virgin EMI	
Various	7 December 2018	Digital download; streaming	Virgin EMI; Capitol	
Various	18 April 2026	LP (Record Store Day exclusive)	Virgin EMI; Capitol	
