= List of number-one albums of 2017 (Ireland) =

The Irish Albums Chart ranks the best-performing albums in Ireland, as compiled by the Official Charts Company on behalf of the Irish Recorded Music Association.

Issue date	Album	Artist	Reference
6 January	Glory Days	Little Mix	
13 January	x	Ed Sheeran	
20 January	I See You	The xx	
27 January	x	Ed Sheeran	
3 February	x	Ed Sheeran	
10 February	Little Fictions	Elbow	
17 February	Human	Rag'n'Bone Man	
24 February	Human	Rag'n'Bone Man	
3 March	Gang Signs & Prayer	Stormzy	
10 March	÷	Ed Sheeran	
17 March	÷	Ed Sheeran	
24 March	÷	Ed Sheeran	
31 March	÷	Ed Sheeran	
7 April	÷	Ed Sheeran	
14 April	÷	Ed Sheeran	
21 April	÷	Ed Sheeran	
28 April	÷	Ed Sheeran	
5 May	÷	Ed Sheeran	
12 May	÷	Ed Sheeran	
19 May	Harry Styles	Harry Styles	
26 May	÷	Ed Sheeran	
2 June	÷	Ed Sheeran	
9 June	Trust the Wire	The Coronas	
16 June	÷	Ed Sheeran	
23 June	Livin' the Dream	Nathan Carter	
30 June	÷	Ed Sheeran	
7 July	÷	Ed Sheeran	
14 July	÷	Ed Sheeran	
21 July	÷	Ed Sheeran	
28 July	÷	Ed Sheeran	
4 August	Everything Now	Arcade Fire	
11 August	÷	Ed Sheeran	
18 August	÷	Ed Sheeran	
25 August	÷	Ed Sheeran	
1 September	Picture This	Picture This	
8 September	Freedom Child	The Script	
15 September	Sleep Well Beast	The National	
22 September	Concrete and Gold	Foo Fighters	
29 September	Picture This	Picture This	
6 October	Picture This	Picture This	
13 October	As You Were	Liam Gallagher	
20 October	Beautiful Trauma	Pink	
27 October	Flicker	Niall Horan	
3 November	Flicker	Niall Horan	
10 November	The Thrill of It All	Sam Smith	
17 November	Reputation	Taylor Swift	
24 November	On the Road	Christy Moore	
1 December	On the Road	Christy Moore	
8 December	Songs of Experience	U2	
15 December	On the Road	Christy Moore	
22 December	÷	Ed Sheeran	
29 December	÷	Ed Sheeran	

== Number-one artists ==
Position	Artist	Weeks at No. 1
1	Ed Sheeran	26
2	Picture This	3
2	Christy Moore	3
3	Rag'n'Bone Man	2
3	Niall Horan	2
4	Little Mix	1
4	The xx	1
4	Elbow	1
4	Stormzy	1
4	Harry Styles	1
4	The Coronas	1
4	Nathan Carter	1
4	Arcade Fire	1
4	The Script	1
4	The National	1
4	Foo Fighters	1
4	Liam Gallagher	1
4	Pink	1
4	Sam Smith	1
4	Taylor Swift	1
4	U2	1

== See also ==
- List of number-one singles of 2017 (Ireland)
