= On the Loose (Niall Horan song) =

2018 single by Niall Horan

Single by Niall Horan

from the album Flicker
- Released: 16 February 2018
- Genre: Pop; pop rock
- Length: 3:43
- Label: Capitol
- Songwriters: John Ryan; Niall Horan; Julian Bunetta
- Producer: Julian Bunetta

Niall Horan singles chronology
"Too Much to Ask" (2017)	"On the Loose" (2018)	"Seeing Blind" (2018)

Music video
- "On the Loose" on YouTube

"On the Loose" is a song recorded by Irish singer-songwriter Niall Horan from his debut studio album Flicker. It was written by Horan, John Ryan, and its producer Julian Bunetta. The song was released to the US Mainstream Top 40 radio on 20 February 2018 as the album's fourth single. The radio version was released commercially on 16 February 2018 and was labeled as the "alternative version".

== Background ==
Horan debuted the song on 13 May 2017 during his performance at Channel 93.3's Summer Kick Off concert in San Diego. On 29 May 2017, Horan performed on The Today Show's Citi Concert Series, closing the show with a live TV debut of "On the Loose".

Horan admitted in an interview with Herald Sun that he channelled Fleetwood Mac for the song. "You can hear the 'Mac in that. Everyone's always trying to write their own Dreams. I'm only 24, Fleetwood Mac is the music I've listened to since I was four years old. I listen to a lot of other types of music but that's the stuff that always stuck around with me. I was going through a punk rock phase when I was 15, I like punk rock now but I wouldn't pick up my iPod and go straight to it, I'd probably go to the 'Mac and Crosby Stills and Nash and Jackson Browne and Tom Petty. They're the artists in my head, you can hear that on the album I think."

He announced on 5 February 2018 via social media that the song would be the fourth single from the album. The accompanying single artwork, illustrated by Kyler Martz, features a drawing of a woman holding a heart, surrounded by flowers, some of which have legs and eyes on them. An animated lyric video for the song was released on 12 February 2018, after Horan posted a 20-second teaser the day before. It features a lady seducing multiple men, while cruising through a city in a convertible.

== Critical reception ==
Christina Lee of Idolator wrote that the song "sounds like a cautionary tale", in comparison to "Slow Hands". Mike Wass of the same publication opined that the song is "similarly upbeat" as "Slow Hands", and found it "more radio-friendly" than Horan's "stripped-back songs".

== Track listing ==
Digital download – alternate version
No.	Title	Length
1.	"On the Loose" (alternate version)	2:38

Digital download – acoustic version
No.	Title	Length
1.	"On the Loose" (acoustic)	3:13

Digital download – Basic Tape remix
No.	Title	Length
1.	"On the Loose" (Basic Tape remix)	2:59

Digital download – Slenderbodies remix
No.	Title	Length
1.	"On the Loose" (Slenderbodies remix)	2:43

== Personnel ==
Credits adapted from Tidal.

- Niall Horan – vocals, guitar
- Julian Bunetta – production, background vocals, percussion, record engineering
- Nathan Dantzler – master engineering
- Tommy King – keyboard
- Michael Freeman – assistant mixing
- Matt Chamberlain – drums
- Mark Goldenberg – guitar
- Val McCallum – guitar
- Spike Stent – mixing

== Charts ==
=== Weekly charts ===
Chart (2017–18)	Peak position
Belgium (Ultratop 50 Flanders)	24
Belgium (Ultratop 50 Wallonia)	24
Canada CHR/Top 40 (Billboard)	49
Canada Hot AC (Billboard)	38
Czech Republic Airplay (ČNS IFPI)	45
Ireland (IRMA)	47
Lebanon (Lebanese Top 20)	10
Mexico Airplay (Billboard)	38
Netherlands (Dutch Top 40)	35
New Zealand Heatseekers (RMNZ)	3
Poland Airplay (ZPAV)	20
Scottish Singles Sales (Official Charts)	66
Sweden Heatseeker (Sverigetopplistan)	14
UK Singles (Official Charts)	94
US Adult Contemporary (Billboard)	29
US Adult Pop Airplay (Billboard)	16
US Dance Airplay (Billboard)	31
US Pop Airplay (Billboard)	22

=== Year-end charts ===
Chart (2018)	Position
Belgium (Ultratop Flanders)	97
Iceland (Plötutíóindi)	81

== Release history ==
Region	Date	Format	Version	Label	Ref.
Various	February 16, 2018	Digital download	Alternate	Capitol	
Australia	February 16, 2018	Contemporary hit radio	Alternate	Capitol	
United States	20 February 2018	Contemporary hit radio	Alternate	Capitol	
United States	9 March 2018	Digital download	Basic Tape remix	Capitol	
United States	15 March 2018	Digital download	Acoustic	Capitol	
United States	23 March 2018	Digital download	Slenderbodies remix	Capitol	
