= Niall Horan =

Irish singer, songwriter and musician (born 1993)

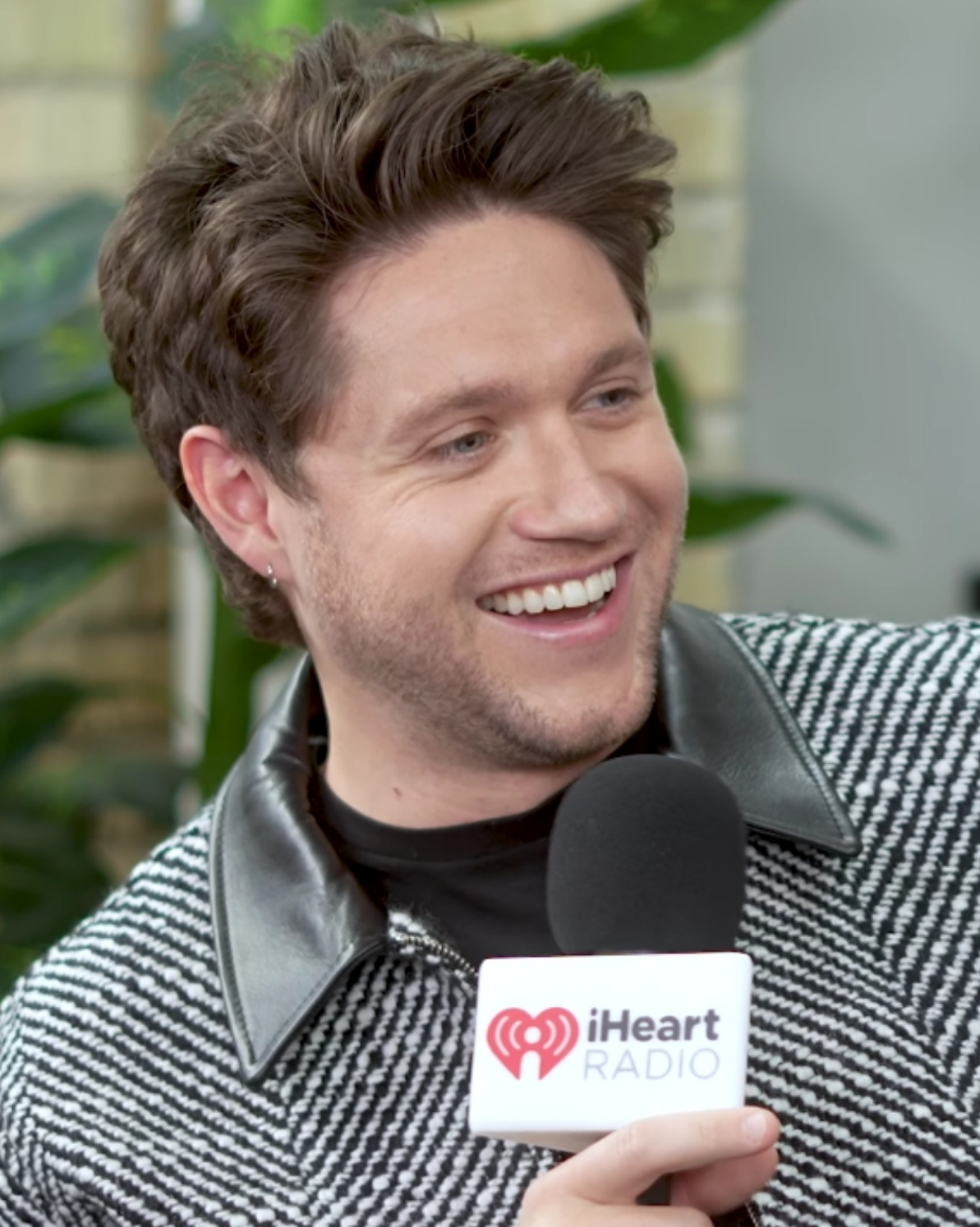
- Horan in 2023

Background information
- Born: Niall James Horan; 13 September 1993 (age 33); Mullingar, County Westmeath, Ireland
- Genres: Pop; soft rock; folk pop; pop rock; country
- Occupations: Singer; songwriter; musician; multi-instrumentalist
- Instruments: Vocals; guitar; piano; harmonica
- Years active: 2010–present
- Labels: Syco; Columbia; Capitol
- Formerly of: One Direction
- Awards: Full list (Note: For awards received as a member of One Direction, see List of awards and nominations received by One Direction.)
- Website: niallhoran.com

Niall James Horan (/ˈnaɪəl ˈhɔːrən/ NY-əl HAW-rən; born 13 September 1993) is an Irish singer, songwriter, musician, and multi-instrumentalist. He rose to prominence as a member of the boy band One Direction, formed in 2010 on the singing competition The X Factor. The group released five albums and went on to become one of the best-selling boy bands of all time.

After the band declared a hiatus in 2016, Horan signed a recording deal as a solo artist with Capitol Records. He has since released four albums: Flicker (2017), Heartbreak Weather (2020), The Show (2023), and Dinner Party (2026). Flicker debuted at number one in Ireland and the US, and reached the top three in Australia and the UK. The album's first two singles, "This Town" and "Slow Hands", reached the top 20 in the UK and US. Heartbreak Weather was released in March 2020, and reached number one on the UK Albums Chart. Horan released his third studio album, The Show, in June 2023, which reached number one in Ireland and the UK, and spawned two singles — "Heaven" and "Meltdown". Dinner Party was released in June 2026, and spawned three singles — "Dinner Party", "Little More Time", and "End of an Era".

In addition to his music career, Horan has worked as a coach on The Voice, co-founded a golf management agency, and advocated for various charitable causes, including autism support and cancer research fundraising.

== Early life ==
Niall James Horan was born on 13 September 1993 in Mullingar, County Westmeath, Ireland. He has an older brother, Greg, who was born in 1987. His parents, Bobby Horan and Maura Gallagher (née Nolan), divorced when he was five years old, so he and his brother lived with their mother for a year. After spending a year apart from their father, they later decided to move in with him. Niall Horan had asthma as a child. He attended Coláiste Mhuire secondary school.

Greg received a guitar for his 15th birthday which he only used once and then it "sat around for a while" until Horan himself picked it up. Horan taught himself how to play by following YouTube tutorials. His aunt discovered his singing ability one day when she was in the car with Horan as he started singing, and she had initially thought that the radio was on. As a teenager, he performed at the Mullingar Arts Centre during a fundraiser for the local football team, the Shamrocks. He also had a support slot with former X Factor contestant Lloyd Daniels at the Academy club in Dublin.

== Career ==
=== 2010–2015: The X Factor and One Direction ===
In 2010, at 16 years old, Horan auditioned for The X Factor in Dublin. He sang Ne-Yo's "So Sick" and received positive comments from the judging panel, which consisted of Louis Walsh, Cheryl Cole, Katy Perry, and Simon Cowell. Horan was then put through to bootcamp. At bootcamp, he failed to qualify for the "Boys" category. After a suggestion from guest judge Nicole Scherzinger, Horan was put into a group with four other boys who had also failed to progress as solo contestants. This made them eligible for the "Groups" category, and because the judges felt they were too talented to send home, they agreed with Nicole Scherzinger’s suggestion to form a boy band. Horan along with Harry Styles, Liam Payne, Louis Tomlinson, and Zayn Malik formed One Direction. Styles came up with the band name, which he thought "sounded good". They became the last contestant eliminated on the show, behind runner-up Rebecca Ferguson and winner Matt Cardle.

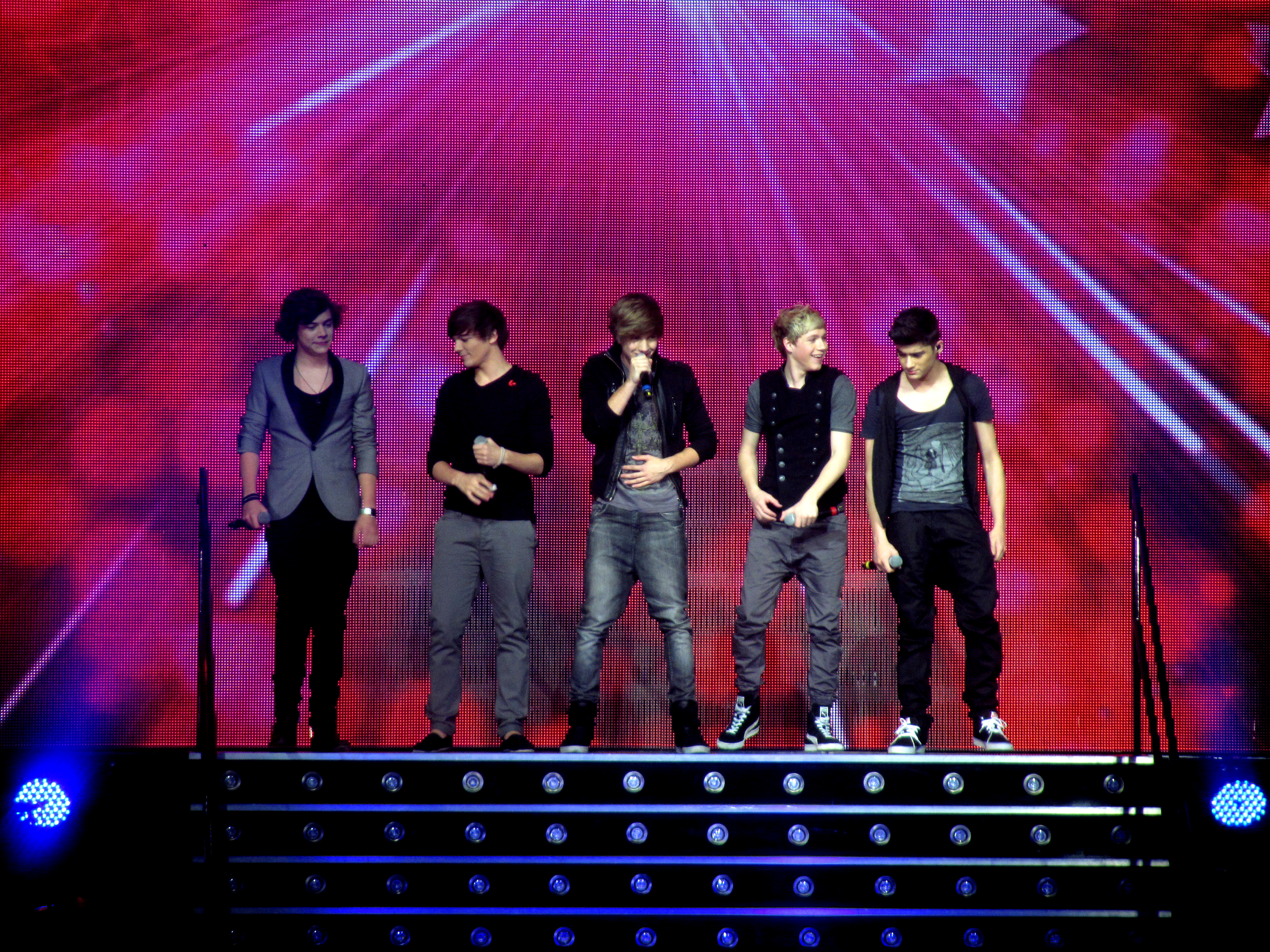
Horan with One Direction on The X Factor Live Tour in 2011

Following The X Factor, One Direction was signed by Cowell to a reported £2 million Syco record contract. They began recording their debut album in Los Angeles in January 2011. That February, the band and other contestants from the series participated in The X Factor Live Tour. One Direction's debut single, "What Makes You Beautiful", was released in September 2011. The song reached number one in several countries. Subsequent singles, "Gotta Be You" and "One Thing" received success, becoming top ten hits in the UK. In November of that year, the group's debut album Up All Night was released in Ireland and the UK, reaching number one and number two on the charts, respectively. The album was released internationally in March 2012, and One Direction became the first UK group to have their debut album reach number one in the United States. To promote the album, they embarked on their first headlining concert tour, the Up All Night Tour.

In September 2012, the group released "Live While We're Young", the lead single from their upcoming second album, which peaked at number three in the UK and US. The album's second single, "Little Things," spawned the band's second number one single in the UK. In November 2012, Take Me Home, One Direction's second album, was released. It reached number one in over ten countries, and reached number one on the Billboard 200. One Direction became the first group since 2008 to have both of their first two albums debut at number one. To support the album, they embarked on their second headlining tour, the Take Me Home Tour, playing over 120 shows over four continents. In August 2013, One Direction: This Is Us, a 3-D documentary concert film was released and was a box office success, grossing over $68.5 million.

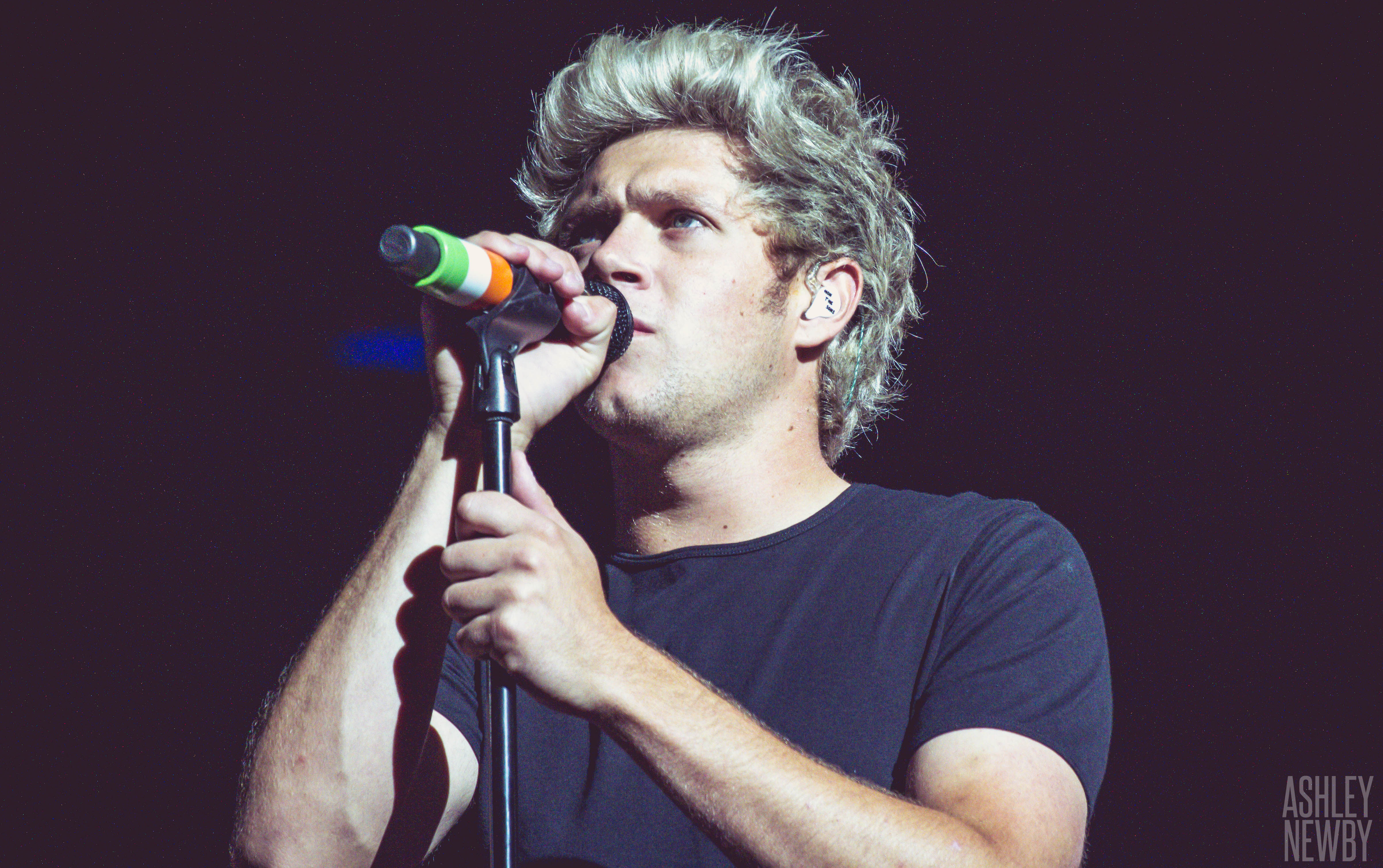
Horan during the On the Road Again Tour at Soldier Field, Chicago in 2015

The band's third studio album, Midnight Memories, was released on 25 November 2013. It was the best-selling album worldwide in 2013 with 4 million copies sold globally. Following the album's release, the group embarked on the Where We Are Tour. In November 2014, One Direction released their fourth album, Four. The album debuted at number one on the Billboard 200 chart, and One Direction became the only group in the 58-year history of the Billboard 200 albums chart to have their first four albums debut at number one. In February 2015, the band embarked on the On The Road Again Tour, playing shows in Australia, Asia, Africa, Europe, and North America. In November 2015, Made in the A.M., their fifth album, was released. Led by singles "Drag Me Down" and "Perfect", the album reached number one in multiple countries, including the UK, while it reached number two on the US Billboard 200. Following the release of the album the group went on an indefinite hiatus.

=== 2016–2022: Flicker and Heartbreak Weather ===
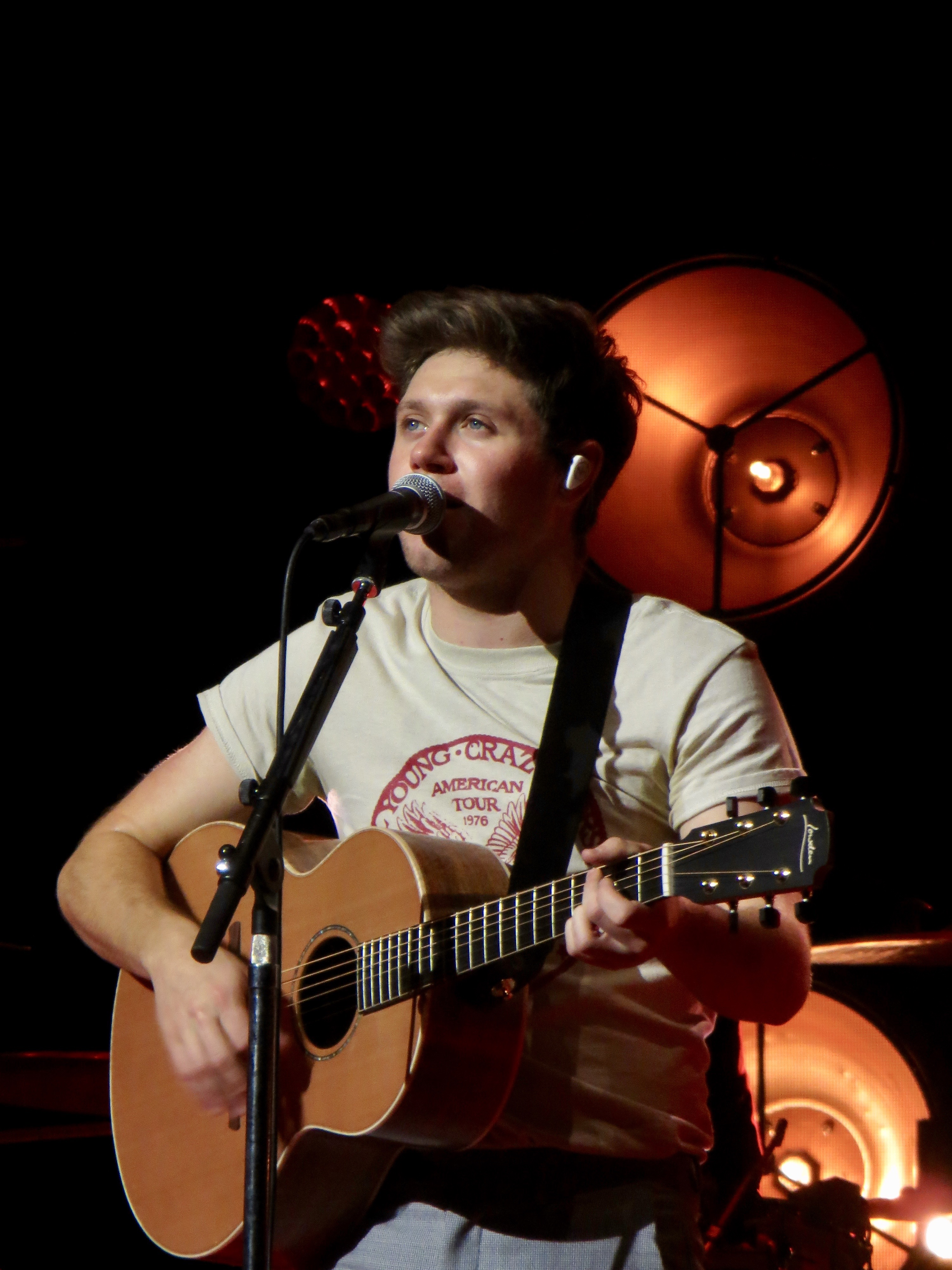
Horan during the Flicker World Tour in Glasgow on 18 March 2018

In May 2016, it was announced that Horan was working on solo music with the songwriters Jake Gosling and Wayne Hector. In June 2016, Horan established Neon Haze Music, which provides music recording and promotional services. In September 2016, Horan signed a record deal with Universal.

On 29 September 2016, Horan released his debut single "This Town" with Capitol Records. It peaked at number 9 on the UK Singles Chart and number 20 on the US Billboard Hot 100. Horan performed the song live at the 2016 American Music Awards, and on The Tonight Show Starring Jimmy Fallon. On 4 May 2017, Horan released his second single "Slow Hands". It also entered the top 10 in the UK and the top 20 in the US. He embarked on a worldwide tour, Flicker Sessions 2017, to promote his debut album Flicker. The tour ran from August to November 2017. On 15 September 2017, Horan released his third single from the album, "Too Much to Ask". Flicker was released on 20 October 2017, and debuted atop the Billboard 200. It also reached number one in Ireland and the Netherlands.

On 8 November 2017, Horan performed "Seeing Blind" alongside Maren Morris at the 51st Country Music Association Awards. In 2018, he embarked on the Flicker World Tour. His song for the Smallfoot soundtrack, "Finally Free", received a nomination from the Hollywood Music in Media Awards for Best Original Song in an Animated Film. He also performed tracks from Flicker for RTÉ and the recordings from the session was included in a live album called Flicker: Featuring the RTÉ Concert Orchestra. In March 2019, he was featured on Julia Michaels' song "What a Time".

Horan's second studio album Heartbreak Weather's lead single, "Nice to Meet Ya", was released on 4 October 2019. "Put a Little Love on Me" was released as the album's second single on 6 December 2019. On 30 October, Horan announced that he would be embarking on the Nice to Meet Ya Tour in 2020. However, the tour was later cancelled due to the COVID-19 pandemic. On 7 February 2020, Horan released the album's third single, "No Judgement". The album was released on 13 March 2020. It debuted at number four on the US Billboard 200, and number one on the UK Albums Chart. While in lockdown, the singer co-wrote a new version of Ashe's song, "Moral of the Story", which was released in June 2020. In 2021, Horan and English singer Anne-Marie released a single called "Our Song" and a cover of Fleetwood Mac's song "Everywhere" for the BBC's Children in Need alongside other UK musicians. In 2022, his TV special that was sponsored by Guinness, Homecoming: The Road to Mullingar with Lewis Capaldi aired on Virgin Media Ireland and was later released to Prime Video.

=== 2023–2024: The Show ===
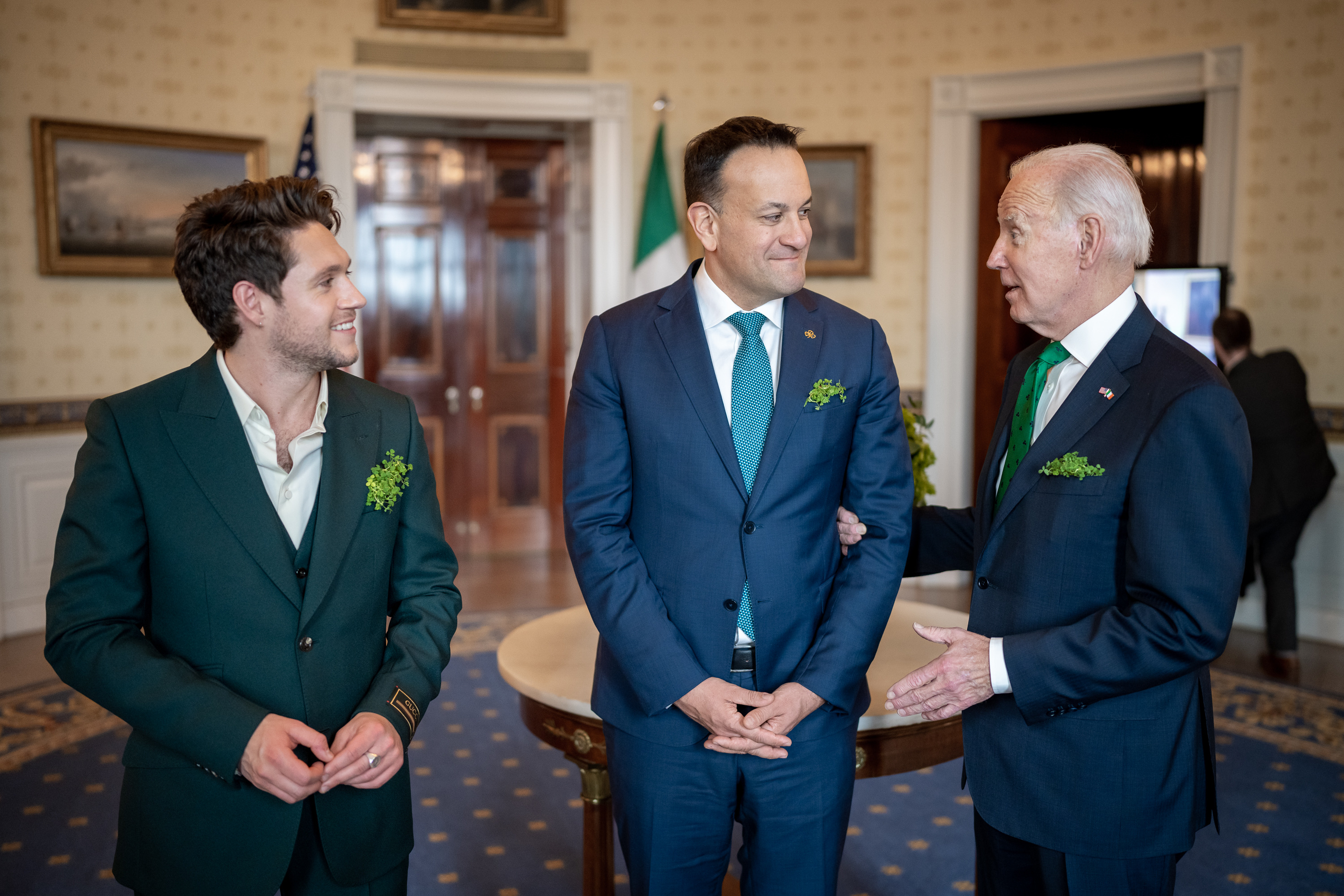
American President Joe Biden (right) talks with Horan and Taoiseach Leo Varadkar before a St Patrick's Day reception, 2023

"Heaven", the lead single from Horan's third studio album The Show, was released on 17 February 2023. The single debuted at number 4 on the Irish singles chart one week later. On 17 March 2023, Horan performed the song at the White House for U.S. President Joe Biden and Taoiseach Leo Varadkar's Saint Patrick's Day celebration. "Meltdown", the second single from his upcoming album, was released on 28 April 2023. The Show was released on 9 June 2023. It debuted at number 1 in at least six countries, including the Irish and UK album charts, and number 2 in the United States of America. The Show received generally positive reviews, with critics praising its cohesive production and Horan's vocal performances, while noting a stylistic shift toward more mature pop-rock influences.

In June 2023, Horan signed a worldwide publishing agreement with Universal Music Publishing Group. Horan made his festival debut at the Boston Calling Music Festival and also performed at other festivals such as the Isle of Wight Festival and TRNSMT in summer 2023.

In 2024, Horan embarked on The Show: Live on Tour, his first headlining tour since 2018, beginning in Europe before continuing through Oceania and North America. Many dates sold out, including multiple nights in major cities such as London, Sydney, and New York. It surpassed 1 million ticket sales. During the tour, Horan performed a surprise duet with Noah Kahan.

=== 2025–present: Dinner Party and collaborations ===
In October 2025, Horan was featured on a new version of Thomas Rhett's song "Old Tricks", released as part of the deluxe edition of About a Woman. The track blends Rhett's country style with pop-leaning harmonies from Horan and achieved commercial success on country radio in the United Kingdom.

On 6 February 2026, Horan collaborated with British singer Myles Smith on the single "Drive Safe". That same month, Horan announced on social media that he had completed work on his fourth studio album. His fourth studio album, Dinner Party, was released on 5 June. The album's title track was released as the first single on 20 March 2026. The album's second single, "Little More Time", was released on 23 April 2026. The third single, "End of an Era", was released on 22 May 2026. The album reached number one on the UK Albums chart.

In March 2026, Horan announced the Dinner Party Tour. The UK and European leg of the tour is set to begin on 22 September 2026, and end on 15 November 2026. In May 2026, Horan announced the North American dates, which begin in March 2027, and end on 29 May 2027. Fans have been invited to help choose the tour's set list. On 23 July 2026, Horan released a duet version of "Baby Now That I Found You" with American actress/singer Ella Bright; the song was taken from the Off Campus soundtrack.

== Other ventures ==
=== Golf ===
In April 2015, Horan was the caddie for Rory McIlroy at the Masters Tournament. In May 2015, he attended the BMW PGA Championship's Pro–am event.

In 2016, Horan and Mark McDonnell founded Modest Golf Management, which manages golfers including Guido Migliozzi, Connor Syme, and Tyrrell Hatton. Horan has also worked as a brand ambassador for Callaway Golf.

=== The Voice ===
In early 2023, Horan became one of the coaches on the 23rd season of The Voice. In May 2023, it was announced that Horan would return for the 24th season, which premiered in late 2023. On 23 May 2023, Gina Miles, a member of Horan's team, won The Voice, making Horan the winning coach on his first season. On 19 December 2023, Huntley, also a member from Horan's team, won the 24th season, making Horan the winning coach for the second consecutive time. In May 2025, it was announced that Horan would return to The Voice after a three season-hiatus for the 28th season, which premiered in late 2025. Horan again coached the winner of the season, Aiden Ross, and became the first coach to win their first three seasons in the show's history.

=== Advocacy ===
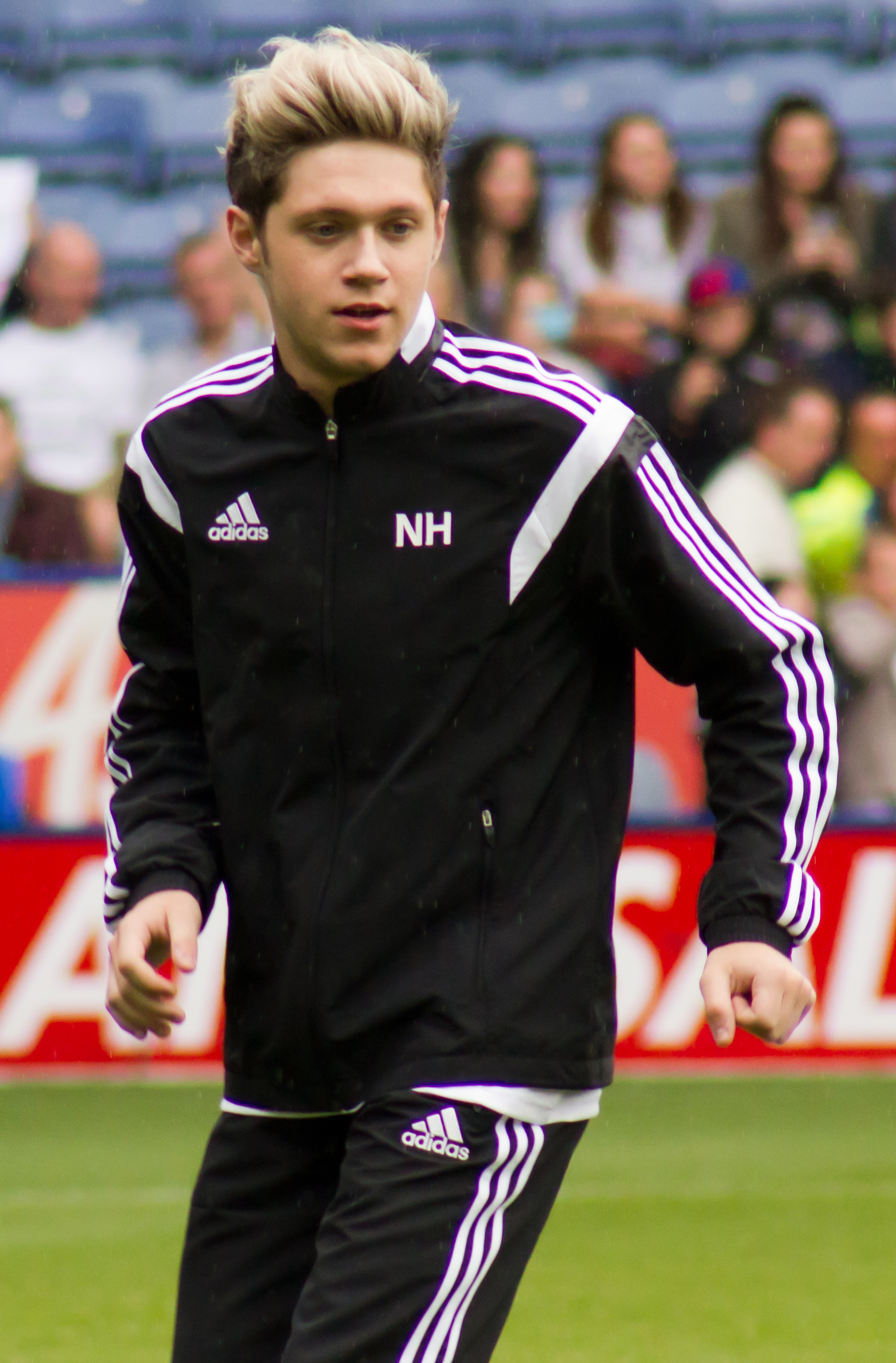
Horan during his Charity Football Challenge at King Power Stadium in May 2014

In 2010, Horan canvassed for the Labour Party. As a member of One Direction, Horan supported Comic Relief in 2013.

In May 2014, Horan hosted the Charity Football Challenge at Leicester City's King Power Stadium to raise money for Irish Autism Action. The celebrity football match had 10,000 spectators and raised about £300,000.

In 2016, Horan continued to support Irish Autism Action by creating limited-edition T-shirts. Horan was a part of the Soccer Aid 2016 and 2019 star lineup to raise funds for UNICEF to benefit children around the world. Horan has been involved with the Drive, Chip, and Putt initiative that encourages and supports young golfers. He has also said he wants to increase female participation in golf and add support and promotion for women golfers. Since 2016, his golf management agency and Justin Rose have hosted fundraising shows called "Horan & Rose" to benefit Cancer Research UK and The Black Heart Foundation. In 2017, Horan received an Arnie Award for his work with charities.

Horan has expressed his support for the Repeal of the Eighth Amendment and the Black Lives Matter movement.

In April 2020, Horan participated in Together at Home, which supported the World Health Organization. He also donated €100,000 to the charity ALONE. The following May, Horan publicly criticised UK Health Secretary Matt Hancock's response to the COVID-19 pandemic. On 7 November 2020, Horan played a special live-streamed concert at the Royal Albert Hall to support his touring crew and We Need Crew during the pandemic.

== Artistry ==
Horan at the NRJ Music Awards in 2013.

Horan's music style has been categorised as soft rock, pop, and pop rock, while also having elements of country, folk, and Americana. His tenor voice has been described as "sweet, high, [and] slightly grainy." Horan grew up listening to rock bands like the Eagles, Fleetwood Mac, and Coldplay, and crooners including Rat Pack members Dean Martin and Frank Sinatra. He is also inspired by singer-songwriters such as Damien Rice, Taylor Swift, Bob Dylan, Bruce Springsteen, and Radiohead.

== Personal life ==
Horan dated American actress/singer Hailee Steinfeld from late 2017 to 2018. Horan began dating account manager Amelia Woolley in 2020, and the relationship was made public in September 2021. He splits his time between Los Angeles and London. He has a nephew. Horan supports English association football team Derby County.

Horan on May 26th, 2014.

In the summer of 2010, while playing football with friends, Horan injured his knee and was diagnosed with a floating kneecap. The problem recurred several times over the next couple of years, including a 2013 incident where he dislocated his knee onstage during a concert in Antwerp, Belgium. Horan went to the United States for major reconstructive surgery in January 2014, after the tour ended. After the surgery, he was invited to do physical therapy with Chelsea by their manager, José Mourinho. Horan went through around seven weeks of physical therapy with the members of the team and their physical therapist at their training ground in Surrey. In April 2018, Horan said he had mild OCD and anxiety. He is colourblind and has difficulty differentiating between orange and red, green and yellow, and shades of blue and purple.

== Achievements ==
As a solo artist, Horan won the American Music Award for New Artist of the Year in 2017, and has received multiple iHeartRadio Music Awards, among other recognitions as both a solo performer and a former member of One Direction.

== Filmography ==
=== Film ===
List of film appearances
Year	Title	Role	Notes	Ref(s).
2013	One Direction: This Is Us	Himself	Documentary concert film	
2014	One Direction: Where We Are – The Concert Film	Himself	Concert film	
2017	On the Record: Niall Horan	Himself	Documentary short film	

=== Television ===
List of TV appearances
Year	Title	Role	Notes	Ref(s).
2012	iCarly	Himself	Episode: "iGo One Direction"	
2016	Celebrity Gogglebox	Himself	With Olly Murs	
2017	One Love Manchester	Himself (performer)	Television special	
2018	Flicker: Featuring the RTÉ Concert Orchestra	Himself	Television special	
2018	The Voice Australia	Guest mentor	Episode: "Semi-Final: Live"	
2019	Saturday Night Live	Himself (performer)	Episode: "Scarlett Johansson/ Niall Horan"	
2021	Jimmy Kimmel Live!	Guest host	Episode: "Niall Horan/ Lizzo/ Cristo Fernández/ Kane Brown/ Jonas Brothers"	
2021	Jonas Brothers Family Roast	Himself	Netflix special	
2022	Niall Horan's Homecoming: The Road to Mullingar with Lewis Capaldi	Himself	Television special	
2023, 2025	The Voice	Coach	Seasons 23–24, 28	

== Discography ==
- Flicker (2017)
- Heartbreak Weather (2020)
- The Show (2023)
- Dinner Party (2026)

== Tours ==
=== Headlining ===
- Flicker Sessions (2017)
- Flicker World Tour (2018)
- The Show: Live on Tour (2024)
- Dinner Party: Live on Tour (2026–2027)
