= Too Much to Ask =

Single by Niall Horan

from the album Flicker
- Released: 15 September 2017
- Length: 3:43
- Label: Capitol
- Songwriters: Niall Horan; Jamie Scott
- Producer: Greg Kurstin

Niall Horan singles chronology
"Slow Hands" (2017)	"Too Much to Ask" (2017)	"On the Loose" (2018)

Music video
- "Too Much to Ask" on YouTube

"Too Much to Ask" is a song recorded by Irish singer-songwriter Niall Horan. It was written by Horan and Jamie Scott, with production handled by Greg Kurstin. The song was released by Capitol Records on 15 September 2017, as the third single from Horan's debut studio album, Flicker (2017). Commercially, "Too Much to Ask" reached the top 10 in Hungary, Ireland, and Scotland as well as the top 20 in Australia, Belgium, Lebanon, Malaysia, the Netherlands, and Slovakia.

== Background ==
Horan expressed in tweets that the song is "very special" to him and it stands out as one of his favourites on the album. He said of the song in an interview with BBC News: "I would obviously like it to go to number one, that would be the dream, but it is what it is. If it's getting a lot love and jumps in at number two or number three, I don't mind." In the single's promotional post on social media, Horan was pictured standing on the left on the escalator in the London Underground. "It's a special one. I actually wrote this song the day after I wrote 'This Town' so I felt like it got off to an alright start when I started writing the album. It's a very nice, beautiful song and means a lot to me. I just can't wait for people to hear it. Hopefully fingers cross that people are going to like it, obviously a lot different to 'Slow Hands'," Horan explained in a Smallzy's Surgery interview.

== Composition ==
"Too Much to Ask" is performed in the key of C major. Horan's vocals span from G2 to F4.

== Critical reception ==
Mike Wass of Idolator was positive about the song, saying: "Niall Horan's solo career continues to go from strength to strength with the arrival of 'Too Much To Ask.' A tender ballad about hankering for an ex, the track showcases the Irishman's simple, heartfelt approach." And went on to call it "a beautifully crafted song" with a "melancholy piano arrangement". Rianne Houghton from Digital Spy was also positive about the song, and said: "Gird your loins, and your tear ducts 1D fans! Niall has released his latest single and it's definitely a tear-jerker. Seriously Niall, who hurt you?"

== Music video ==
Niall uploaded the official audio on day of release to his YouTube Vevo account and then the official music video six days later on 21 September 2017. It was directed by Malia James. Jon Blistein of Rolling Stone explained the video in his review about the song's video, writing:

"The Malia James-directed clip finds Horan grappling with lost love as he sings the poignant and nostalgic lyrics in an empty room and watches a couple flirt and kiss on the tube. Horan finds solace while sharing a pint and playing the tune with his mates, though the clip ends with the musician contending with loneliness as he wanders the streets of London."

== Track listing ==
Digital download
No.	Title	Length
1.	"Too Much to Ask"	3:43

Digital download – TRU Concept remix
No.	Title	Length
1.	"Too Much to Ask" (TRU Concept remix)	3:29

Digital download – Cedric Gervais remix
No.	Title	Length
1.	"Too Much to Ask" (Cedric Gervais remix)	3:04

Digital download – acoustic version
No.	Title	Length
1.	"Too Much to Ask" (acoustic version)	3:41

== Personnel ==
Credits adapted from Tidal.

- Niall Horan – songwriting
- Jamie Scott – songwriting, background vocals
- Greg Kurstin – production, keyboard, bass guitar, drums, guitar, piano, recording engineering
- Michael Freeman – assistant mixing
- Spike Stent – mixing, programming
- Alex Pasco – recording engineering
- Julian Burg – recording engineering

== Charts ==
=== Weekly charts ===
Weekly chart performance
Chart (2017–2018)	Peak position
Australia (ARIA)	19
Austria (Ö3 Austria Top 40)	29
Belgium (Ultratop 50 Flanders)	18
Belgium (Ultratop 50 Wallonia)	47
Canada Hot 100 (Billboard)	41
Czech Republic Singles Digital (ČNS IFPI)	29
France (SNEP)	37
Germany (GfK)	61
Hungary (Single Top 40)	8
Hungary (Stream Top 40)	36
Ireland (IRMA)	6
Italy (FIMI)	65
Japan Hot 100 (Billboard)	29
Latvia (DigiTop100)	50
Lebanon Airplay (Lebanese Top 20)	14
Malaysia (RIM)	14
Netherlands (Dutch Top 40)	12
Netherlands (Mega Top 50)	20
Netherlands (Single Top 100)	20
New Zealand Heatseekers (RMNZ)	1
Norway (VG-lista)	32
Philippines (Philippine Hot 100)	33
Portugal (AFP)	44
Scottish Singles Sales (Official Charts)	9
Slovakia Airplay (ČNS IFPI)	37
Slovakia Singles Digital (ČNS IFPI)	18
Spain (Promusicae)	26
Sweden (Sverigetopplistan)	34
Switzerland (Schweizer Hitparade)	37
UK Singles (Official Charts)	24
US Billboard Hot 100	66
US Adult Contemporary (Billboard)	24
US Adult Pop Airplay (Billboard)	17
US Dance Club Songs (Billboard)	1
US Pop Airplay (Billboard)	18

=== Year-end charts ===
Annual chart rankings
Chart (2017)	Position
Netherlands (Dutch Top 40)	64
Chart (2018)	Position
Iceland (Plötutíóindi)	84
Netherlands Airplay (Airplay Top 40)	52
US Dance Club Songs (Billboard)	16

== Certifications ==
Region	Certification	Certified units/sales
Australia (ARIA)	3× Platinum	210,000^{‡}
Belgium (BRMA)	Gold	10,000^{‡}
Brazil (Pro-Música Brasil)	Platinum	60,000^{‡}
Canada (Music Canada)	2× Platinum	160,000^{‡}
Denmark (IFPI Danmark)	Platinum	90,000^{‡}
Italy (FIMI)	Gold	25,000^{‡}
New Zealand (RMNZ)	Platinum	30,000^{‡}
Norway (IFPI Norway)	Gold	30,000^{‡}
Spain (Promusicae)	Gold	30,000^{‡}
United Kingdom (BPI)	Gold	400,000^{‡}
United States (RIAA)	Gold	500,000^{‡}
^{‡} Sales+streaming figures based on certification alone.

== Release history ==
Region	Date	Format	Version	Label	Ref.
Various	15 September 2017	Digital download	Original	Capitol	
Italy	29 September 2017	Contemporary hit radio	Original	Universal	
United States	10 October 2017	Contemporary hit radio	Original	Capitol	
Various	10 October 2017	Digital download	TRU Concept remix	Capitol	
Various	10 October 2017	Digital download	Cedric Gervais remix	Capitol	
Various	3 November 2017	Digital download	Acoustic	Capitol	
