= Flicker (album) =

Studio album by Niall Horan
- Released: 20 October 2017
- Studios: Enemy Dojo (Calabasas, California); Sarm Music Village (London, UK); The Music Shed (London, UK); Echo (Los Angeles, California); EastWest (Los Angeles, California); Blackbird (Nashville, Tennessee); The LBT (Nashville, Tennessee); State of The Ark (Richmond)
- Genres: Soft rock; folk; folk-pop; country
- Length: 35:54
- Label: Capitol
- Producers: Julian Bunetta; Greg Kurstin; Jacquire King; AFTERHRS; Mark "Spike" Stent; TMS

Niall Horan chronology
Flicker (2017)	Heartbreak Weather (2020)

Singles from Flicker
- 1. "This Town" Released: 29 September 2016; 2. "Slow Hands" Released: 4 May 2017; 3. "Too Much to Ask" Released: 15 September 2017; 4. "On the Loose" Released: 20 February 2018; 5. "Seeing Blind" Released: 1 June 2018

Flicker is the first solo studio album by the Irish singer and songwriter Niall Horan. It was released on 20 October 2017 by Capitol Records. "This Town" was released on 29 September 2016 as the album's lead single, followed by "Slow Hands", "Too Much to Ask", "On the Loose", and "Seeing Blind".

Flicker debuted on the Billboard 200 chart at number one selling 152,000 units in the U.S., Horan's first number one album in the U.S. as a solo artist.

== Background ==
In September 2016, it was announced that Horan had signed a solo deal with Capitol Records. In an interview with Entertainment Weekly, Horan said the album was inspired by classic rock acts including Fleetwood Mac and the Eagles. "Whenever I would pick up a guitar, I would always naturally play chords like that, and finger pick a lot and play that folky kind of style." He also described the collection as having a "folk-with-pop feel to it".

In August 2017, Horan debuted several songs from the album during a live show at the Shepherd's Bush Empire in London. He revealed that he had contacted Maren Morris asking her to contribute to his song "Seeing Blind". On 15 September 2017, Horan announced the album on his social media accounts, revealing the album's title, cover art, and release date as well as the release of the third single from the album, "Too Much to Ask". The track list was unveiled on 22 September 2017. Horan told Zane Lowe on his Beats 1 radio show that the album's title track, "Flicker", meant the most to him and "was a very poignant moment in the recording process", to the extent that "it changed the way I recorded the rest of the album". He also expressed in his op-ed for The Independent that the album O by Damien Rice had inspired the production of the aforementioned track and "Paper Houses".

== Promotion ==
=== Singles ===
The album's lead single, "This Town" was released with an accompanying music video of a live performance on 29 September 2016. It was Horan's first single outside of the boy band One Direction. It peaked at number nine on the UK Singles Chart, and number 20 on the US Billboard Hot 100. The second single, "Slow Hands", was released on 4 May 2017. After it was released it received favourable reviews from critics, with Billboard describing the song as a "R&B-inflected rock tune". The single charted within the top 10 in a number of countries and reached number 11 on the US Billboard Hot 100.

"Too Much to Ask" was released as the third single on 15 September 2017. The music video was uploaded to YouTube on 21 September 2017. "On the Loose" was announced as the album's fourth single on 5 February 2018. It was playing on US Mainstream Top 40 radio on 20 February 2018. "Seeing Blind" was the fifth single in June 2018. An official acoustic video clip was released on 4 June 2018.

=== Tour ===
Horan embarked on his first headlining concert tour, Flicker Sessions to promote the album. The concert series was announced on 10 July 2017 on Horan's social media accounts and website. It began on 29 August 2017 at the Olympia Theatre in Dublin, Ireland. Later Horan embarked on his second tour in support of the album, the Flicker World Tour.

== Critical reception ==
Professional ratings
Aggregate scores
Source	Rating
AnyDecentMusic?	5.4/10
Metacritic	64/100
Review scores
Source	Rating
AllMusic	4/5 stars
The Guardian	2/5 stars
The Independent	3/5 stars
The Irish Times	2/5 stars
NME	3/5 stars
The Daily Telegraph	3/5 stars

At Metacritic, which assigns a normalised rating out of 100 to reviews from mainstream critics, the album has an average score of 64 out of 100, which indicates "generally favorable reviews" based on 5 reviews.

Nick Levine of NME was positive about the album, calling its content "appealingly simple and straightforward", noting Horan's influences of Fleetwood Mac and the Eagles, concluding his review by praising it as a "promising" and "well-pitched" debut. Neil Yeung of AllMusic was similarly positive, noting Horan's "big first step" into musical maturity, finding his "own voice". Andy Gill, for The Independent, wrote that "it would have been easy for the One Direction heartthrob to trot out a collection of ersatz R&B crowd-pleasers", but instead "he keeps faith with the West Coast influences that first drew him into music", while also noting Fleetwood Mac's influence and complimenting "the formula of fat, warm bass and drums anchoring light guitars". Neil McCormick of The Daily Telegraph commented that "the songs are immediately distinctive" and called the album as a whole "tasteful", adding that "chord changes are sweetly satisfying, melodies spill gently forth with singing that is soft, tuneful and emotionally understated" while comparing the album's sounds to those of Fleetwood Mac and The Eagles. Writers for Rolling Stone named Flicker one of the top albums of the year, writing that Horan "turns on the soft-rock charm on his solo debut" and that the album allows "Horan to winkingly flaunt his fully grown status" while calling "Slow Hands" "not so secretly one of the best solo singles from a former 1D member to hit radio this year". Ed Power of The Irish Examiner praised the album's authenticity and the "level of tepid craftsmanship, from which it rarely departs" while calling Horan "unquestionably an accomplished musician and vocalist".

Some reviews were more mixed, with Alexis Petridis of The Guardian calling it "middle of the road" and stating that "none of it is terribly exciting". While adding that it may be "easy to mock", he later contrasted its content and potential positively against that of Horan's past bandmates, Harry Styles and Zayn Malik. Louise Bruton of The Irish Times gave the album a two-star review (out of five), commenting that "it reeks of nostalgia for Don Henley’s Hotel California". Craig Jenkins of Vulture wrote that "the album loads all of its best material up front" while describing the latter part of the album as full of "delicate, drippy acoustic tunes" that "are perfectly pleasant" but "don’t ask much of the singer". Jenkins ended his review by saying the album "is a good start" although it "often smolders but it never really catches fire".

== Commercial performance ==
In Ireland and the Netherlands, Flicker debuted at number one. With 152,000 album-equivalent units and 128,000 copies sold in the United States, it also opened atop the Billboard 200, tying One Direction with the Beatles for the most members (three) with a solo US number-one album. Horan also became the group's third member to top the Canadian Albums Chart when the record entered at the summit with over 16,000 consumption units in the nation. Elsewhere the album debuted at number two in Australia and Italy while opening at number three in New Zealand, Scotland, and the United Kingdom.

== Track listing ==
Flicker – Standard edition
No.	Title	Writer(s)	Producer(s)	Length
1.	"On the Loose"	Niall Horan; Julian Bunetta; John Ryan	Bunetta	3:43
2.	"This Town"	Horan; Jamie Scott; Mike Needle; Daniel Bryer	Greg Kurstin	3:52
3.	"Seeing Blind" (with Maren Morris)	Horan; Ruth-Anne Cunningham; Matthew Smith Radosevich	Jacquire King	3:05
4.	"Slow Hands"	Horan; Alexander Izquierdo; Ryan; Bunetta; Cunningham; Tobias Jesso Jr.	Bunetta; Afterhrs^{[a]}; Mark "Spike" Stent^{[a]}	3:07
5.	"Too Much to Ask"	Horan; Scott	Kurstin	3:43
6.	"Paper Houses"	Horan; Iain Archer	King	3:34
7.	"Since We're Alone"	Horan; Greg Kurstin; Dan Wilson; Cunningham	Kurstin	4:02
8.	"Flicker"	Horan; Bunetta; Ryan	King	4:18
9.	"Fire Away"	Horan; Bunetta; Ryan; Cunningham	Bunetta	3:26
10.	"You and Me"	Horan; Radosevich; Cunningham	King	3:04
Total length:				35:54

Flicker – Deluxe edition
No.	Title	Writer(s)	Producer(s)	Length
11.	"On My Own"	Horan; Ed Drewett; Tom Barnes; Peter Kelleher; Ben Kohn	TMS	4:00
12.	"Mirrors"	Horan; Scott; Needle; Bryer	Bunetta; Afterhrs	3:38
13.	"The Tide"	Horan; Bunetta; Ryan	King	3:20
Total length:				46:52

Flicker – Japan/Target edition
No.	Title	Length
14.	"Flicker" (acoustic)	4:12
15.	"On the Loose" (acoustic)	3:14
Total length:		54:18

Flicker – Japan deluxe edition (bonus DVD)
No.	Title	Length
1.	"This Town" (music video)
2.	"Slow Hands" (music video)
3.	"Too Much to Ask" (music video)
4.	"Japan Trip Behind the Scenes"
5.	"Interview"

Notes

- ^{^[a]} signifies an additional producer

== Personnel ==
Credits adapted from the liner notes of Flicker.

=== Personnel and musicians ===
- Niall Horan – lead vocals, guitar (1, 3–4, 6, 8–9, 11–13)
- Maren Morris – featured artist (3)
- AFTERHRS – synthesizer (4)
- Vern Asbury – guitars (11)
- Tom Barnes – drums (11), percussion (11)
- Alisha Bauer – cello (8, 13)
- Eli Beaird – bass guitar (10)
- Daniel Bryer – background vocals (12)
- Julian Bunetta – background vocals (1, 4, 9), percussion (1), drums (9, 12), piano (9), bass guitar (12), guitar (12), keyboards (12)
- Ann Marie Calhoun – violin (2)
- Matt Chamberlain – drums (1)
- Daphne Chen – string quartet (8), violin (8, 13)
- Irina Chirkova – cello (2)
- Ruth-Anne Cunningham – background vocals (9, 10)
- Eric Darken – percussion (3, 6, 10, 13)
- Dave Emery – keyboards (4)
- Ian Fitchuk – drums (10), piano (10)
- Ian Franzino – bass guitar (12), drums (12), guitar (12), keyboards (12)
- Ilona Geller – viola (2)
- Mark Goldenberg – guitar (1, 4)
- Eric Gorfain – violin (8, 13)
- Andrew Haas – bass guitar (12), drums (12), guitar (12), keyboards (12)
- Jedd Hughes – electric guitar (10)
- John Joseph – bass guitar (3, 6, 8, 13)
- Leah Katz – string quarter (8), viola (8, 13)
- Peter Kelleher – organ (11)
- Tommy King – keyboards (1), organ (4)
- Sam Klempner – background vocals (11), bass guitar (11)
- Ben Kohn – claps (11), bells (11)
- Greg Kurstin – acoustic guitar (2, 7), bass guitar (2, 5, 7), drums (2, 5, 7), guitar (2, 5), piano (2, 5, 7), keyboards (5), electric guitar (7), synthesizers (7)
- Greg Leisz – acoustic guitar (2)
- Todd Lombardo – acoustic guitar (10)
- Val McCallum – guitar (1)
- Mike Needle – background vocals (12)
- Zac Rae – piano (3, 6, 8, 13), synthesizers (3, 6, 8, 13)
- John Ryan – background vocals (9), guitar (4), bass (9)
- Bridget Sarai – background vocals (7)
- Jamie Scott – background vocals (5, 12)
- Aaron Sterling – drums (3, 6, 8, 13), percussion (3, 6, 8, 13)
- Chris Stills – background vocals (6)
- Spencer Thomson – acoustic guitar (3, 6, 8, 13), electric guitar (3, 6, 8, 13), guitar (10)
- Leah Zeger – violin (2)

=== Production ===
- AFTERHRS – production (12), recording (12), additional production (4), programming (4)
- Chris Bishop – additional vocal engineering (11)
- Daniel Bryer – additional programming (12)
- Julian Bunetta – production (1, 4, 9, 12), recording (1, 4, 9, 12), programming (12), additional recording (4)
- Julian Burg – recording (2, 5, 7)
- Nathan Dantzler – mastering
- Eric Darken – drum programming (3, 6, 10, 13)
- Brendan Dekora – recording assistant (3, 6, 8, 13)
- Dave Emery – programming (4)
- Ian Franzino – programming (12)
- Michael Freeman – mixing assistant
- Eric Gorfain – string arrangement (8, 13)
- Eric Greedy – additional recording (4)
- Andrew Haas – programming (12)
- Martin Hannah – recording (12)
- Jacquire King – production (3, 6, 8, 10, 13), recording (3, 6, 8, 10, 13), programming (3, 6, 8, 10, 13), session conductor (3, 6, 8, 13)
- Sam Klempner – additional engineering (11)
- Greg Kurstin – production (2, 5, 7), recording (2, 5, 7), string arrangement (2), drum programming (7)
- Kolton Lee – vocal editing (3, 6, 8, 13)
- Alex Pasco – recording (2, 5, 7)
- John Rausch – recording (3, 6, 8, 10, 13)
- Jamie Scott – recording (12), additional programming (12)
- Mark "Spike" Stent – additional production (4), mixing, programming (4)
- Spencer Thomson – programming (3, 6, 10, 13)
- TMS – production (11), recording (11)

=== Design ===
- Conor McDonnell – interior gatefold photo
- David Needleman – photography
- Nick Steinhardt – design

== Charts ==
=== Weekly charts ===
Weekly chart performance for Flicker
Chart (2017)	Peak position
Australian Albums (ARIA)	2
Austrian Albums (Ö3 Austria)	6
Belgian Albums (Ultratop Flanders)	5
Belgian Albums (Ultratop Wallonia)	15
Canadian Albums (Billboard)	1
Czech Albums (ČNS IFPI)	6
Danish Albums (Hitlisten)	4
Dutch Albums (Album Top 100)	1
Finnish Albums (Suomen virallinen lista)	6
French Albums (SNEP)	24
German Albums (Offizielle Top 100)	8
Greek Albums (IFPI Greece)	10
Irish Albums (IRMA)	1
Italian Albums (FIMI)	2
Japanese Albums (Oricon)	41
Latvian Albums (LaIPA)	29
Mexican Albums (AMPROFON)	2
New Zealand Albums (RMNZ)	3
Norwegian Albums (VG-lista)	4
Polish Albums (ZPAV)	6
Portuguese Albums (AFP)	2
Scottish Albums (Official Charts)	3
Spanish Albums (Promusicae)	4
Swedish Albums (Sverigetopplistan)	5
Swiss Albums (Schweizer Hitparade)	11
UK Albums (Official Charts)	3
US Billboard 200	1

=== Year-end charts ===
Year-end chart performance for Flicker
Chart (2017)	Position
Australian Albums (ARIA)	54
Belgian Albums (Ultratop Flanders)	112
Dutch Albums (Album Top 100)	84
Mexican Albums (AMPROFON)	74
UK Albums (OCC)	96
US Billboard 200	179

Chart (2018)	Position
Belgian Albums (Ultratop Flanders)	156
Dutch Albums (Album Top 100)	92
Irish Albums (IRMA)	22
US Billboard 200	170

== Certifications ==
Certifications for Flicker
Region	Certification	Certified units/sales
Australia (ARIA)	Platinum	70,000^{‡}
Austria (IFPI Austria)	Gold	7,500^{‡}
Brazil (Pro-Música Brasil)	Gold	20,000^{‡}
Canada (Music Canada)	3× Platinum	240,000^{‡}
Denmark (IFPI Danmark)	Platinum	20,000^{‡}
Ireland (IRMA)	2× Platinum	30,000^{^}
Italy (FIMI)	Gold	25,000^{‡}
Mexico (AMPROFON)	Gold	30,000^{‡}
New Zealand (RMNZ)	2× Platinum	30,000^{‡}
Norway (IFPI Norway)	Platinum	20,000^{‡}
Poland (ZPAV)	Platinum	20,000^{‡}
Singapore (RIAS)	Gold	5,000^{*}
Sweden (GLF)	Gold	20,000^{‡}
United Kingdom (BPI)	Gold	100,000^{‡}
United States (RIAA)	Platinum	1,000,000^{‡}
^{*} Sales figures based on certification alone.^{^} Shipments figures based on certification alone.^{‡} Sales+streaming figures based on certification alone.

== See also ==
- List of 2017 albums
- List of Billboard 200 number-one albums of 2017
- List of number-one albums of 2017 (Canada)
- List of number-one albums of 2017 (Ireland)
- List of UK top-ten albums in 2017
