= Seeing Blind =

Single by Niall Horan and Maren Morris

from the album Flicker
- Released: 1 June 2018
- Genre: Country pop
- Length: 3:05
- Label: Capitol
- Songwriters: Niall Horan; Ruth-Anne Cunningham; Matthew Smith Radosevich
- Producer: Jacquire King

Niall Horan singles chronology
"On the Loose" (2018)	"Seeing Blind" (2018)	"What a Time" (2019)

Maren Morris singles chronology
"Rich" (2018)	"Seeing Blind" (2018)	"Girl" (2019)

Music video
- "Seeing Blind" on YouTube

"Seeing Blind" is a song recorded by Irish singer-songwriter Niall Horan, featuring guest vocals from American singer Maren Morris. The song is taken from Horan's debut studio album Flicker. It was written by Horan, Ruth-Anne Cunningham and Matthew Smith Radosevich and was produced by Jacquire King. The song was released to the Australian contemporary hit radio on 1 June 2018 as the album's fifth and final single.

== Music video ==
An official acoustic video clip was released on 4 June 2018. Abby Jones from Billboard said "[the] acoustic video sees Horan and Morris in a cozy, homey studio, which serves as the perfect visual backdrop to the country-pop love jam. Horan strums away as he begins the tune, but it's not long before Maren joins him in a blissful harmony that almost sounds better than the original version."

== Track listing ==
Digital download
No.	Title	Length
1.	"Seeing Blind"	3:05

== Charts ==
Chart (2017)	Peak position
Ireland (IRMA)	68

== Certifications ==
Certifications for "Seeing Blind"
Region	Certification	Certified units/sales
Australia (ARIA)	Gold	35,000^{‡}
New Zealand (RMNZ)	Gold	15,000^{‡}
^{‡} Sales+streaming figures based on certification alone.

== Release history ==
Region	Date	Format	Version	Label	Ref.
Australia	1 June 2018	Contemporary hit radio	Album version	Capitol	
