= This Town (Niall Horan song) =

2016 single by Niall Horan

Single by Niall Horan

from the album Flicker
- Released: 29 September 2016
- Genre: Acoustic pop
- Length: 3:52
- Label: Capitol
- Songwriters: Niall Horan; Jamie Scott; Mike Needle; Daniel Bryer
- Producer: Greg Kurstin

Niall Horan singles chronology
"This Town" (2016)	"Slow Hands" (2017)

"This Town" is the debut solo single by Irish singer-songwriter Niall Horan, released on 29 September 2016 by Capitol Records as the lead single from his debut solo album Flicker (2017). An accompanying music video of a live performance was released the same day. The song was written by Horan, Jamie Scott, Mike Needle, Daniel Bryer and produced by Greg Kurstin. It is Horan's first solo single, as well as the second solo single released by a One Direction member (the first being Zayn Malik's "Pillowtalk" earlier that year), following the hiatus of the band, which was announced in August 2015. It peaked at number 9 on the UK Singles Chart, earning it his second highest-charting single as a lead artist to date, behind "Slow Hands". It also peaked at number 20 on the US Billboard Hot 100.

== Composition ==
The song is written in the key of A major with a common time tempo of 112 beats per minute. Horan's vocals span from D_{3} to E_{4} in the song. The acoustic track reflects on the things the singer never got to say to a lost lover.

== Critical reception ==
Harriet Gibsone from The Guardian thought Horan's "This Town" "promotes his guise as an acoustic balladeer," while the video is "reinforcing the authenticity of his future career as a credible artist with skills beyond being adorable." She concluded "The modern music world can be discombobulating for those opposed to gender fluid pop stars or auto-tuned trap." Entertainment Weekly editor Madison Vain wrote "the song shows growth thanks to its nuance in storytelling. He’s burdened by all the things he never got to say—and it sounds believable." Vain also thought "Horan has said he’s mining the sound of some of his biggest influences: Bob Dylan and Simon & Garfunkel. But with collaborator Greg Kurstin behind the boards, “This Town” skews more towards the modern, folk-influenced songwriting of Vance Joy and Ed Sheeran." For Raisa Bruner of Time is a "lush, guitar-forward ballad in the vein of the band’s earlier tearjerkers, with hints of Sheeran in the small-town storytelling of the lyrics." For Noisey, Sarah Sahim was critical of the track, noting the song was "nothing special", but its saccharine sweetness gives it all the makings of a decent hit.

== Live performances ==
Horan gave the first televised performance of "This Town" on The Graham Norton Show on 22 October 2016. On 26 October 2016 he performed on The Ellen DeGeneres Show. Later that day, he appeared on The Late Late Show with James Corden to sing the single. On 13 December 2016, he performed on The Tonight Show Starring Jimmy Fallon. He also performed the song at the Radio 1 Teen Awards, and the American Music Awards. In December, he made guest appearances across North America as part of iHeartRadio's Jingle Ball Tour.

On 4 June 2017, Horan performed "This Town" during the One Love Manchester benefit concert for the victims of the Manchester Arena bombing after Ariana Grande's show.

== Track listings ==
- Digital download
1. "This Town" – 3:52
- Digital download – live
1. "This Town" (Live, 1 Mic 1 Take) – 3:52
- Remixes EP
1. "This Town" (Tiësto Remix) – 3:01
2. "This Town" (Cheat Codes Remix) – 3:21
3. "This Town" (Goldhouse Remix) – 4:00
4. "This Town" (Cabo San Remix) – 4:04
5. "This Town" (Nikö Blank Remix) – 3:28

== Charts ==
=== Weekly charts ===
Chart (2016–17)	Peak position
Australia (ARIA)	5
Austria (Ö3 Austria Top 40)	24
Belgium (Ultratop 50 Flanders)	22
Belgium (Ultratip Bubbling Under Wallonia)	14
Canada Hot 100 (Billboard)	27
Czech Republic Singles Digital (ČNS IFPI)	30
Denmark (Tracklisten)	25
Finland Download (Latauslista)	1
France (SNEP)	34
Germany (GfK)	52
Greece Digital Songs (IFPI Greece)	4
Hungary (Rádiós Top 40)	25
Hungary (Single Top 40)	18
Ireland (IRMA)	6
Italy (FIMI)	34
Lebanon (Lebanese Top 20)	18
Netherlands (Dutch Top 40)	12
Netherlands (Single Top 100)	24
New Zealand (Recorded Music NZ)	24
Norway (VG-lista)	20
Portugal (AFP)	20
Scottish Singles Sales (Official Charts)	2
Slovakia Airplay (ČNS IFPI)	70
Slovakia Singles Digital (ČNS IFPI)	19
Spain (Promusicae)	22
Sweden (Sverigetopplistan)	18
Switzerland (Schweizer Hitparade)	40
UK Singles (Official Charts)	9
US Billboard Hot 100	20
US Adult Contemporary (Billboard)	12
US Adult Pop Airplay (Billboard)	4
US Dance Club Songs (Billboard)	3
US Pop Airplay (Billboard)	12

=== Year-end charts ===
Chart (2016)	Position
Netherlands (Dutch Top 40)	89

Chart (2017)	Position
Netherlands (Dutch Top 40)	70
Netherlands (Single Top 100)	91
US Adult Contemporary (Billboard)	21
US Adult Top 40 (Billboard)	20
US Dance Club Songs (Billboard)	50
US Digital Songs (Billboard)	43
US Mainstream Top 40 (Billboard)	46
US Radio Songs (Billboard)	65

== Certifications ==
Region	Certification	Certified units/sales
Australia (ARIA)	6× Platinum	420,000^{‡}
Austria (IFPI Austria)	Platinum	30,000^{‡}
Belgium (BRMA)	Gold	10,000^{‡}
Brazil (Pro-Música Brasil)	Platinum	60,000^{‡}
Canada (Music Canada)	7× Platinum	560,000^{‡}
Denmark (IFPI Danmark)	2× Platinum	180,000^{‡}
Germany (BVMI)	Gold	200,000^{‡}
Italy (FIMI)	Gold	25,000^{‡}
New Zealand (RMNZ)	3× Platinum	90,000^{‡}
Norway (IFPI Norway)	Platinum	40,000^{‡}
Portugal (AFP)	Gold	5,000^{‡}
Spain (Promusicae)	Gold	30,000^{‡}
Sweden (GLF)	Platinum	40,000^{‡}
United Kingdom (BPI)	2× Platinum	1,200,000^{‡}
United States (RIAA)	5× Platinum	5,000,000^{‡}
^{‡} Sales+streaming figures based on certification alone.

== Release history ==
Region	Date	Format	Label	Ref.
Worldwide	29 September 2016	Digital download	Capitol	
United States	4 October 2016	Contemporary hit radio	Capitol	
Worldwide	18 November 2016	Digital download – live	Capitol	
Worldwide	8 December 2016	Digital download – remixes EP	Capitol	
Various	28 January 2025	7" – live at the Royal Albert Hall	Capitol	
