= List of The Late Show with Stephen Colbert episodes (2021) =

- No. of episodes: 168 (and 4 specials)

Release
- Original network: CBS
- Original release: January 4 – December 16, 2021

Season chronology
- ← Previous; 2020 episodes Next → 2022 episodes

This is the list of The Late Show with Stephen Colbert episodes that aired in 2021.

== 2021 ==
=== January ===
No.	Original release date	Guest(s)	Musical/entertainment guest(s)
1019	January 4, 2021	Stacey Abrams, RuPaul	Maren Morris
Stacey Abrams discusses the upcoming Senate election in Georgia and recent politics. RuPaul discusses RuPaul's Drag Race. Maren Morris performs "Better Than We Found It".
1020	January 5, 2021	Dr. Sanjay Gupta, Anya Taylor-Joy	N/A
The Adventures of Mike Pence. Catch A Third Wave: Endless Bummer. Late Show Presents: Quarantine-While. Quarantine-While Presents: Vageenwhile. Dr. Sanjay Gupta discusses the COVID-19 pandemic and his new book, Keep Sharp. Anya Taylor-Joy discusses The Queen's Gambit.
1021	January 6, 2021	Amy Klobuchar, Adam Kinzinger	Jamila Woods
Special live episode following the storming of the United States Capitol. Senator Amy Klobuchar and Representative Adam Kinzinger discuss recent politics and the storming of the United States Capitol. Jamila Woods performs "Sula (Paperback)".
1022	January 7, 2021	Rachel Brosnahan	Julien Baker
Late Show Presents: Quarantine-While. Rachel Brosnahan discusses I'm Your Woman. Julien Baker performs "Faith Healer" from her album Little Oblivions.
1023	January 8, 2021	Tom Hanks, Meryl Streep, George Clooney	The Mountain Goats
Trumptanic. 2021: The Week That Felt Like A Year – A ̶F̶o̶n̶d̶ Look Back. Tom Hanks (new footage from December 16, 2020 episode), Meryl Streep (new footage from December 7, 2020 episode) and George Clooney (new footage from December 18, 2020 episode) take "The Colbert Questionert". The Mountain Goats perform "Get Famous" from their album Getting Into Knives. A Late Show Presents: Zoom Out!
1024	January 11, 2021	Chris Rock, Aubrey Plaza	Joss Stone
Don and the Giant Impeach 2: Go Fast, We're Furious. Chris Rock discusses Total Blackout: The Tamborine Extended Cut, his new stand-up special. Aubrey Plaza plays "Tea at the Plaza" (new footage from December 3, 2020 episode). Joss Stone performs "Walk with Me".
1025	January 12, 2021	James Comey, Lili Reinhart	N/A
Don and the Giant Impeach 2: Go Fast, We're Furious. James Comey discusses recent politics and his new book, Saving Justice: Truth, Transparency, and Trust. Lili Reinhart discusses Riverdale and her book, Swimming Lessons.
1026	January 13, 2021	Samantha Bee, Paul Mescal	N/A
Don and the Giant Impeach 2: Go Fast, We're Furious. Late Show Presents: Quarantine-While. Quarantine-While Presents: Peen-While. Peen-While Presents: Peen-Jail. Peen-Jail Presents: Well, Yeah! Samantha Bee discusses Full Frontal and recent politics. Paul Mescal discusses Normal People.
1027	January 14, 2021	Senator Bernie Sanders	FINNEAS
Don and the Giant Impeach 2: Go Fast, We're Furious. Senator Bernie Sanders discusses recent politics. FINNEAS performs "Can't Wait to Be Dead".
1028	January 15, 2021	John Heilemann, Mark McKinnon, & Alex Wagner	The War on Drugs
Late Show Presents: Quarantine-While. John Heilemann, Mark McKinnon, & Alex Wagner discuss recent politics. The War on Drugs performs "Arms Like Boulders" from their 2008 album Wagonwheel Blues.
1029	January 18, 2021	Senator Cory Booker	Infinity Song
And Just Like That... finds a new Samantha (special appearance by Gilbert Gottfried). A cameo appearance by Laura Benanti as Melania Trump. Senator Cory Booker discusses recent politics. Infinity Song performs "Mad Love" from their upcoming album of the same name.
1030	January 19, 2021	Jason Segel	Black Pumas
Seditionist Round Up Roundup. Late Show Presents: Quarantine-While. Jason Segel discusses Our Friend. Black Pumas perform "Colors" from their self-titled album. A Late Show Presents: Zoom Out!
1031	January 20, 2021	Jon Lovett, Jon Favreau & Tommy Vietor	Peter CottonTale, Chance the Rapper and Cynthia Erivo featuring the Chicago Children's Choir, Chicago Youth Symphony Orchestras and Kofi Lost
Special live episode following the inauguration of Joe Biden. Jon Lovett, Jon Favreau & Tommy Vietor discuss recent politics. Peter CottonTale, Chance the Rapper and Cynthia Erivo perform "Together", featuring the Chicago Children's Choir, Chicago Youth Symphony Orchestras and Kofi Lost.
1032	January 21, 2021	Priyanka Chopra Jonas, Derek DelGaudio & Frank Oz	N/A
Late Show Presents: Quarantine-While. Turn The Left Bottom Middle Sideways Toward The Front-Facing Part. Priyanka Chopra Jonas discusses The White Tiger. Derek DelGaudio & Frank Oz discuss the film adaptation of In & Of Itself. A Late Show Presents: Zoom Out!
1033	January 25, 2021	Serena Williams	Dayglow
Catch A Third Wave: Endless Bummer. The Final Pee Pee Joke. Don and the Giant Impeach 2: Go Fast, We're Furious. Uh-Oh! Yikes! Gulp! Serena Williams discusses her participation in the upcoming Australian Open. Dayglow performs "Can I Call You Tonight?" from his album Fuzzybrain.
1034	January 26, 2021	Colin Firth & Stanley Tucci	Adrianne Lenker
Don and the Giant Impeach 2: Go Fast, We're Furious. Catch A Third Wave: Endless Bummer. Late Show Presents: Quarantine-While. Colin Firth & Stanley Tucci discuss Supernova. Adrianne Lenker performs "Anything" from her album Songs.
1035	January 27, 2021	Billy Crystal, Representative Jackie Speier	N/A
Catch A Third Wave: Endless Bummer. Norms! Billy Crystal discusses Standing Up, Falling Down. Representative Jackie Speier discusses recent politics.
1036	January 28, 2021	Viggo Mortensen, Charles Blow	N/A
The Wolf of Couch Street. Late Show Presents: Quarantine-While. Viggo Mortensen discusses Falling. Charles Blow discusses his new book, The Devil You Know. A Late Show Presents: Zoom Out!
Special	January 29, 2021	President Biden, Vice President Harris and First Lady Biden	N/A
Check Your Malarkey At The Door! Joe Time Like The Present, Kamala-N Feel The Noise! Sorry New Country, Who Dis? Pres-Travaganza! Late Show Family Meeting with Joe Biden (segment rebroadcast from December 6, 2016 episode). Stephen's first Late Show interview with Joe Biden (segment rebroadcast from September 10, 2015 episode). Jon Batiste's song for Kamala Harris. Joe Biden & Dr. Jill Biden discuss recent politics in a special interview in Wilmington, Delaware (segment rebroadcast from December 17, 2020 episode). Mood Mix with Senator Kamala Harris (new footage from November 21, 2019 episode).

=== February ===
No.	Original release date	Guest(s)	Musical/entertainment guest(s)
1037	February 1, 2021	Ethan Hawke	Mickey Guyton
A Late Show Weather. Ethan Hawke discusses his new book, A Bright Ray of Darkness. Mickey Guyton performs "Black Like Me" from her album Bridges. A Late Show Presents: Zoom Out!
1038	February 2, 2021	Zendaya, Father James Martin	N/A
Late Show Presents: Quarantine-While. Zendaya discusses Malcolm & Marie. Father James Martin discusses his new book, Learning to Pray. A Late Show Presents: Zoom Out!
1039	February 3, 2021	Salma Hayek, Mark Harris	N/A
Marjorie. Don and the Giant Impeach 2: Go Fast, We're Furious. Writer John Thibodeaux discusses Harriet Tubman's upcoming $20 bill. Salma Hayek discusses Bliss. Mark Harris discusses his new book, Mike Nichols: A Life. A Late Show Presents: Zoom Out!
1040	February 4, 2021	Tiffany Haddish	H.E.R.
Late Show Presents: Quarantine-While. Tiffany Haddish discusses Tiffany Haddish Presents: They Ready. H.E.R. performs "Fight for You" from the film Judas and the Black Messiah. A Late Show Presents: Zoom Out!
Special	February 7, 2021	Robert Downey Jr., Tiffany Haddish	Metallica
Special episode airing after Super Bowl LV. A Late Show Presents: Great Directors Direct The Player Intros (special appearances by Victor Cruz, Markus Kuhn, Jonathan Casillas, Lorenzo Carter, Folorunso Fatukasi and Bennett Jackson). Foggy Pine Books (voiceover by Sam Elliott and special appearance by Tom Hanks). A Late Show Presents: Proposed NFL Rule Changes From The Players In The Super Bowl (special appearances by Tristan Wirfs, Chris Jones and Rob Gronkowski). Robert Downey Jr. discusses his work with the Footprint Coalition. A Late Show Presents: Proposed NFL Rule Changes From The Players In The Super Bowl (special appearances by Sean Murphy-Bunting, Tyrann Mathieu and Donovan Smith). Tiffany Haddish takes "The Colbert Questionert" (new footage from February 4 episode). Metallica performs "Enter Sandman" from their 1991 self-titled fifth album. A Late Show Presents: Zoom Out!
1041	February 8, 2021	Queen Latifah, Steven Yeun	N/A
Catch a Third Wave: Endless Bummer. Don and the Giant Impeach 2: Go Fast, We're Furious. Seditionist Round Up Roundup. Late Show Presents: Quarantine-While. Queen Latifah discusses The Equalizer. Steven Yeun discusses Minari.
1042	February 9, 2021	John Oliver	Ingrid Andress
Law & Order: Impeachment Unit. Don and the Giant Impeach 2: Go Fast, We're Furious. John Oliver discusses recent politics and takes the "Which Muppet Are You?" quiz. Ingrid Andress performs "Lady Like" from her album of the same name. A Late Show Presents: Zoom Out!
1043	February 10, 2021	Kristen Wiig, Rebecca Breeds	N/A
Don and the Giant Impeach 2: Go Fast, We're Furious. Kristen Wiig discusses Barb and Star Go to Vista Del Mar. Rebecca Breeds discusses Clarice. A Late Show Presents: Zoom Out!
1044	February 11, 2021	Blake Shelton	Blake Shelton
A sea shanty for the Tampa Bay Buccaneers. Don and the Giant Impeach 2: Go Fast, We're Furious. Late Show Presents: Quarantine-While. First Drafts: Valentine's Day Cards. Blake Shelton discusses his new single, "Minimum Wage". Blake Shelton performs "Minimum Wage".
1045	February 22, 2021	Bill Gates	Tune-Yards
Lock Him Up! Keep In Mind: Everyone's Fine! Late Show Presents: Quarantine-While. Bill Gates discusses the COVID-19 pandemic and his new book, How to Avoid a Climate Disaster. Tune-Yards perform "hold yourself." from their forthcoming album Sketchy.
1046	February 23, 2021	Billie Eilish; Anna Palmer & Jake Sherman	N/A
Space News: Mars Edition! Stephen and Jon Batiste acknowledge Tiger Woods' single-car collision and emergency surgery. Billie Eilish discusses The World's a Little Blurry. Anna Palmer & Jake Sherman discuss recent politics and their work for Punchbowl News.
1047	February 24, 2021	Arsenio Hall	Celeste
A call for the expansion of Black History Month (special appearance by Tim Meadows). Arsenio Hall discusses his time as the host as The Arsenio Hall Show, and Coming 2 America. Celeste performs "Hear My Voice" from the film The Trial of the Chicago 7. A Late Show Presents: Zoom Out!
1048	February 25, 2021	Regina King	Vic Mensa featuring Wyclef Jean and Peter CottonTale
Catch A Third Wave: Endless Bummer. Seditionist Round Up Roundup. Late Show Presents: Quarantine-While. Late Show's Uninformed Correspondent: Race Relations (special appearance by Congressman Jamaal Bowman). Regina King discusses One Night in Miami.... Vic Mensa performs a medley of "Shelter" and "FR33DOM" from his upcoming EP I TAPE, featuring Wyclef Jean and Peter CottonTale. A Late Show Presents: Zoom Out!

=== March ===
No.	Original release date	Guest(s)	Musical/entertainment guest(s)
1049	March 1, 2021	Andy Samberg, Clarissa Ward	N/A
Andy Samberg discusses Palm Springs. Clarissa Ward discusses recent politics and her new book, On All Fronts. A Late Show Presents: Zoom Out!
1050	March 2, 2021	Neil deGrasse Tyson	Jon Batiste
New York Mutant COVID Variant. A Late Show's Oh, the Books You Can Read! Late Show Presents: Quarantine-While. Quarantine-While Presents: Breaking News. Quarantine-While Presents: Told Ya So. Neil deGrasse Tyson discusses the Mars rover Perseverance's landing on Mars and his new book, Cosmic Queries. Jon Batiste performs "I Need You" from his album We Are. A Late Show Presents: Zoom Out!
1051	March 3, 2021	Paul Bettany	Metallica
Somewhere In Texas. Uh-Oh! Yikes! Gulp! Paul Bettany discusses WandaVision. Metallica performs "Battery" in the 35th anniversary of the release of their album Master of Puppets.
1052	March 4, 2021	Jane Fonda, the hosts of Tooning Out the News: "Virtue Signal"	Kings of Leon
Seditionist Round Up Roundup. Space News: Rocket Edition! A Late Show Presents: Great Moments In Oopsa-Bravery. Late Show Presents: Quarantine-While. Jane Fonda discusses her political activism and F.T.A. The hosts of Virtue Signal discuss Tooning Out the News. Kings of Leon perform "The Bandit" from their album When You See Yourself.
1053	March 8, 2021	Nicolle Wallace, Michaela Coel	Kings of Leon
Nicolle Wallace discusses Deadline: White House and recent politics. Michaela Coel discusses I May Destroy You. Kings of Leon perform "Stormy Weather" from their album When You See Yourself. A Late Show Presents: Zoom Out!
1054	March 9, 2021	Riz Ahmed	Janelle Monáe
Breaking News. Late Show Presents: Quarantine-While. #ColbertSmallBizBump. Riz Ahmed discusses Sound of Metal. Janelle Monáe performs "Turntables" from the film All In: The Fight for Democracy.
1055	March 10, 2021	Emmanuel Acho, Gina Yashere	N/A
Food News. Emmanuel Acho discusses The Bachelor and his new book, Uncomfortable Conversations with a Black Boy. Gina Yashere discusses Bob Hearts Abishola and her new book, Cack-Handed.
1056	March 11, 2021	Billy Crystal, Aaron Paul	Lake Street Dive
Keep In Mind: Everyone's Fine! Late Show Presents: Quarantine-While. Billy Crystal takes "The Colbert Questionert" (new footage from January 27 episode). Aaron Paul discusses The Coldest Case. Lake Street Dive performs "Hypotheticals" from their album Obviously.
Special	March 12, 2021	Dr. Anthony Fauci	N/A
A Late Show Quaranniversary Special: The Year That Took 100 Years But Was Also Somehow One Long Day. Dr. Anthony Fauci discusses the COVID-19 pandemic. Doctor's Orders. A Slate Show.
1057	March 15, 2021	Ringo Starr	N/A
Vote Is Lava. Catch A Third A Wave: Bummer's End. A Late Show's Regards to Broadway (special appearances by Laura Benanti and Christopher Jackson). Ringo Starr discusses his new EP, Zoom In; his new book, Ringo Rocks: 30 Years of the All Starrs; and Peter Jackson's upcoming documentary, The Beatles: Get Back.
1058	March 16, 2021	Lupita Nyong'o, Martin Freeman	N/A
Seditionist Round Up Roundup. Late Show Presents: Quarantine-While. Lupita Nyong'o discusses Romeo and Juliet. Martin Freeman discusses Breeders and the 20th anniversary of The Office.
1059	March 17, 2021	Magic Johnson, Eric Andre	N/A
Stephen acknowledges the mass spa shootings at Atlanta, Georgia. Exactly What You Thought, But Worse Than You Imagined. Magic Johnson discusses the upcoming March Madness tournament and his rivalry with Larry Bird. Eric Andre discusses Bad Trip.
1060	March 18, 2021	Senate Majority Leader Chuck Schumer, Jared Leto	LANCO
Senate Majority Leader Chuck Schumer discusses recent politics. Jared Leto discusses The Little Things, House of Gucci and Zack Snyder's Justice League. LANCO performs "Near Mrs."
1061	March 22, 2021	Robert Downey Jr., Walter Isaacson	Sebastián Yatra & Guaynaa
Space News: Spaceship Edition. Zack Snyder's Justice League's Post Credits Scene: The Colbert Cut. Robert Downey Jr. outlines plans for a new show with Stephen (new footage from February 7 episode). Walter Isaacson discusses his new book, The Code Breaker. Sebastián Yatra & Guaynaa perform "Chica Ideal".
1062	March 23, 2021	Dana Carvey	Imagine Dragons
Stephen acknowledges the mass shooting at Boulder, Colorado. Dana Carvey discusses his new podcast, Fantastic. Imagine Dragons performs "Follow You".
1063	March 24, 2021	Sharon Stone, Ken Burns	N/A
Seditionist Round Up Roundup. Seditionist Round Up Roundup Update: Breaking Moos. Suez Nuez. Hungry-Man For Women. First Drafts: Easter Cards. Sharon Stone discusses her new book, The Beauty of Living Twice. Ken Burns discusses Hemingway.

=== April ===
No.	Original release date	Guest(s)	Musical/entertainment guest(s)
1064	April 5, 2021	John Cena, Senator Tammy Duckworth	N/A
Gaetz-Gaete! John Cena discusses The Suicide Squad, Peacemaker, Wipeout and his new books, Be a Work in Progress and Do Your Best Every Day to Do Your Best Every Day. Senator Tammy Duckworth discusses recent politics and her new book, Every Day Is a Gift.
1065	April 6, 2021	Ronan Farrow, Brandi Carlile	N/A
The Vax-Scene. Late Show Presents: Quarantine-While. Ronan Farrow discusses recent politics. Brandi Carlile discusses her new book, Broken Horses. A Late Show Presents: Zoom Out!
1066	April 7, 2021	Leslie Odom Jr., Michio Kaku	N/A
Gaetz-Gaete! Space News: Space Travel Edition! Dinosaur News! Leslie Odom Jr. discusses One Night in Miami... Michio Kaku discusses his new book, The God Equation. A Late Show Presents: Zoom Out!
1067	April 8, 2021	Hank Azaria	Cheap Trick
Gaetz-Gaete! Late Show Presents: Quarantine-While. Hank Azaria discusses The Jim Brockmire Podcast. Celebrity Tax Tips (special appearance by Jeff Goldblum; segment rebroadcast from April 5, 2019 episode). Cheap Trick performs "Boys & Girls & Rock N Roll" from their album In Another World.
1068	April 12, 2021	John Boehner	Shelley FKA DRAM
Stephen acknowledges the death of Daunte Wright. Gaetz-Gaete! John Boehner discusses recent politics and his new book, On the House. Shelley FKA DRAM performs "Exposure". A Late Show Presents: Zoom Out!
1069	April 13, 2021	Taylor Swift, Daniel Kaluuya	Lucy Dacus
The Vax-Scene. Gaetz-Gaete! Taylor Swift tells the truth about her song "Hey, Stephen". Late Show Presents: Quarantine-While. Daniel Kaluuya discusses Judas and the Black Messiah. Lucy Dacus performs "Hot & Heavy" from her album Home Video.
1070	April 14, 2021	Willie Geist, Maria Bakalova	N/A
Gaetz-Gaete! The Vax-Scene. Late Show writer Eliana Kwartler joins Stephen to talk about the Janssen COVID-19 vaccine. Willie Geist discusses Weekend Today. Maria Bakalova discusses Borat Subsequent Moviefilm.
1071	April 16, 2021	Amanda Seyfried	Ashley McBryde
Do It In The Bot. Look at the Old Man Go! Gaetz-Gaete! Late Show Presents: Quarantine-While. Amanda Seyfried discusses Mank. Ashley McBryde performs "Sparrow" from her album Never Will.
1072	April 19, 2021	Anthony Hopkins & Florian Zeller, Senator Mazie Hirono	N/A
Space News: Martian Chronicle! The Vax-Scene. Chris Evans' Sack of Jokes. Anthony Hopkins & Florian Zeller discuss The Father. Senator Mazie Hirono discusses recent politics and her new book, Heart of Fire.
1073	April 20, 2021	Cher	Sam Williams
Stephen acknowledges the verdict of the trial of Derek Chauvin. Hygiene Theater. Late Show Presents: Quarantine-While. Cher discusses her new documentary, Cher & The Loneliest Elephant. Sam Williams performs "Can't Fool Your Own Blood" from his album Glasshouse Children.
1074	April 21, 2021	Ed Helms, Susan Page	N/A
Seditionist Round Up Roundup. The Vax-Scene. Let's Get Bucked Up! Stephen presents new items from his own lifestyle brand, Covetton House: Mothertton House. Ed Helms discusses Rutherford Falls, his days as a correspondent for The Daily Show and Together Together. Susan Page discusses recent politics and her new book, Madam Speaker.
1075	April 22, 2021	Joe Scarborough & Mika Brzezinski	Bebe Rexha
Earth Facts. Space News: Earth Day Edition: Mars Update. Late Show Presents: Quarantine-While. Joe Scarborough & Mika Brzezinski discuss recent politics. Bebe Rexha performs "Sacrifice" from her album Better Mistakes.
1076	April 26, 2021	Anthony Mackie, Terry Gross	N/A
The Vax-Scene. Late Show Presents: Quarantine-While. Anthony Mackie discusses The Falcon and the Winter Soldier. Terry Gross discusses Fresh Air and Stephen's upcoming interview in the show.
1077	April 27, 2021	Senator Amy Klobuchar, Kyle MacLachlan	N/A
The Vax-Scene. Seditionist Round Up Roundup. Senator Amy Klobuchar discusses recent politics and her new book, Antitrust. Kyle MacLachlan discusses Atlantic Crossing.
1078	April 28, 2021	Senator Bernie Sanders	Julia Michaels
Special live episode following President Biden's Address to Congress. Rudy, Rudy, Fresh & Screwed-y. Senator Bernie Sanders discusses President Biden's Address and recent politics. Late Show Presents: Quarantine-While. Julia Michaels performs "All Your Exes" from her album Not in Chronological Order.
1079	April 29, 2021	Mila Kunis	Sara Kays
The Vax-Scene. First Drafts: Mother's Day Cards, with Stephen's wife, Evie. Mila Kunis discusses Four Good Days. Sara Kays performs "Remember That Night?".
1080	April 30, 2021	Jane Fonda, John Oliver, Ringo Starr	Teddy Swims
TheMoreYouJoe. John Oliver (new footage from February 9 episode), Jane Fonda (new footage from March 4 episode) and Ringo Starr (new footage from March 15 episode) take "The Colbert Questionert". Teddy Swims performs "Bed on Fire".

=== May ===
No.	Original release date	Guest(s)	Musical/entertainment guest(s)
1081	May 10, 2021	Jake Tapper, Billie Eilish	Billie Eilish
Jake Tapper discusses recent politics and his new book, The Devil May Dance. Billie Eilish discusses her new book, Billie Eilish, and her new album, Happier Than Ever. Billie Eilish performs "Your Power".
1082	May 11, 2021	Michelle Obama	N/A
The Vax-Scene. Yacht Wachtch. The New York Post's Leonardo DiCaprio kerfuffle (special appearance by Seth Rogen). Michelle Obama discusses Waffles + Mochi. A Late Show Presents: Zoom Out!
1083	May 12, 2021	Senator Elizabeth Warren, David Boreanaz	N/A
Senator Elizabeth Warren discusses recent politics and her new book, Persist. David Boreanaz discusses SEAL Team.
1084	May 13, 2021	Seth Rogen	Jack Ingram, Miranda Lambert & Jon Randall
Stephen celebrates his 57th birthday. The Vax-Scene. Late Show Presents: Quarantine-While. Seth Rogen discusses his new book, Yearbook. Jack Ingram, Miranda Lambert & Jon Randall perform "In His Arms" from their collaborative album The Marfa Tapes.
1085	May 14, 2021	Billy Crystal & Tiffany Haddish	The Black Keys
ColbertSmallBizBump (special appearance by Kenny G). That's Wild Life! Billy Crystal & Tiffany Haddish discuss Here Today. The Black Keys perform "Crawling King Snake" from their album Delta Kream.
1086	May 17, 2021	Cindy McCain, Mj Rodriguez	N/A
The Vax-Scene. A Late Show's Moment of Human Contact. Gaetz-Gaete! Gates-Gaete! Tiger on the Loose! Tiger on the Loose!: Tiger Found Edition. Cindy McCain discusses recent politics and her new book, Stronger. Mj Rodriguez discusses Pose.
1087	May 18, 2021	Morgan Freeman, Tig Notaro	N/A
The Mask Confusion Rises. The Vax-Scene. Late Show Presents: Quarantine-While. Morgan Freeman discusses Solos. Tig Notaro discusses Army of the Dead.
1088	May 19, 2021	Lisa Kudrow, Tamika D. Mallory	N/A
Breaking News. Space News: UFOs Are Real!! A Late Show Films Presents: Re-Entering Society: How To and Why For. Lisa Kudrow discusses Friends: The Reunion and HouseBroken. Tamika D. Mallory discusses recent politics and her new book, State of Emergency.
1089	May 20, 2021	John Krasinski	Yo-Yo Ma
Seditionist Round Up Roundup. Late Show Presents: Quarantine-While. Cicada Updada! Cicada Updada Updada! John Krasinski discusses A Quiet Place Part II and takes "The Colbert Questionert". Yo-Yo Ma performs a medley of "Amazing Grace" and "Going Home" from his album Songs of Comfort & Hope. The episode marked the first time a guest has appeared on set in the Ed Sullivan Theater office building since March 2020, except for Stephen's wife, Evie, who has been present on set and has been a part of many broadcasts during the pandemic.
1090	May 24, 2021	Anthony Anderson, Dr. Francis Collins	N/A
The Vax-Scene. Late Show Presents: Quarantine-While. Anthony Anderson discusses Black-ish. Dr. Francis Collins discusses the COVID-19 pandemic. A Late Show Presents: Zoom Out!
1091	May 25, 2021	Gayle King	BTS
A special appearance by pop singer Richard Marx. BTS Teaches Hand Gestures. Gayle King discusses recent politics. BTS performs "Butter".
1092	May 26, 2021	Will Arnett	Brockhampton
Watercress-Gate. The Late Show with Stephen Colbert: The Snyder Cut (special appearance by Zack Snyder). Will Arnett discusses Smartless and LEGO Masters. Brockhampton performs "Don't Shoot Up the Party" from their album Roadrunner: New Light, New Machine. A Late Show Presents: Zoom Out!
1093	May 27, 2021	Bradley Whitford, Carlos Watson	N/A
Writer Michael Cruz Kayne provides a few examples of Asian-Americans. The National Home and Freedom Reign. Late Show Presents: Quarantine-While. Bradley Whitford discusses recent politics, The Handmaid's Tale and Tick, Tick... Boom! Carlos Watson discusses The Carlos Watson Show.

=== June ===
No.	Original release date	Guest(s)	Musical/entertainment guest(s)
1094	June 7, 2021	Chris Matthews	Cynthia Erivo
Marjorie Taylor Greene's Calendar Song. The Vax-Scene. Is This Meat? Space News: Billionaires... In Space!! Edition. Late Show's Uninformed Correspondent: Brood X Cicadas Edition. Chris Matthews discusses recent politics and his new book, This Country. Cynthia Erivo performs "The Good" from her album Ch. 1 Vs. 1.
1095	June 8, 2021	Clive Owen, Ziwe Fumudoh	N/A
Exactly What You Thought, But Worse Than You Imagined. The Vax-Scene. Late Show Presents: Quarantine-While. Clive Owen discusses Lisey's Story. Ziwe Fumudoh discusses Ziwe.
1096	June 9, 2021	Samuel L. Jackson, Padma Lakshmi	N/A
The Vax-Scene. Uncle Jeff Cam. Samuel L. Jackson discusses Hitman's Wife's Bodyguard. Padma Lakshmi steps into the kitchen with Stephen and discusses Taste the Nation. A Late Show Presents: Zoom Out!
1097	June 10, 2021	Seth Rogen, USAID Administrator Samantha Power	Maroon 5
Late Show Presents: Quarantine-While. Seth Rogen takes "The Colbert Questionert" (new footage from May 13 episode). Samantha Power discusses recent politics. Maroon 5 performs "Lost" from their album Jordi. A special farewell to A Late Show.
1098	June 14, 2021	Jon Stewart	Jon Batiste
The Late Show Vax In Action: An Immunity Theater Production of The State of Reunion With a Live Body-Ody-Audience! Episode marks the show's return to the Ed Sullivan Theater, which included a live audience, for the first time in 460 days. The Vax-Scene. President Joe Biden joins via satellite (special appearance by Dana Carvey). Jon Stewart discusses the COVID-19 pandemic. Jon Batiste performs "Freedom" from his album We Are.
1099	June 15, 2021	Dr. Sanjay Gupta, Rita Moreno	N/A
Seditionist Round Up Roundup. Late Show Presents: Meanwhile. Dr. Sanjay Gupta discusses the COVID-19 pandemic and his podcast, Chasing Life. Rita Moreno discusses the upcoming 50th anniversary of West Side Story and the 2021 film adaptation, and her documentary Rita Moreno: Just a Girl Who Decided to Go for It.
1100	June 16, 2021	Anderson Cooper	Sleater-Kinney
Open Up and Say Ahhhhmerica. First Drafts: Father's Day Cards, with Stephen's wife, Evie. Anderson Cooper discusses Father's Day and recent politics. Sleater-Kinney performs "Worry with You" from their album Path of Wellness.
1101	June 17, 2021	Nathan Lane	Griff
Late Show Presents: Meanwhile. Nathan Lane discusses the return of Broadway on September 14. Griff performs "Black Hole" from her mixtape One Foot in Front of the Other.
1102	June 21, 2021	Andrew Garfield, Lorde	N/A
Ignited Airlines: Lose Your S*** In The Sky. A sneak preview at season 2 of Bridgerton (special appearance by Gilbert Gottfried). Andrew Garfield discusses The Eyes of Tammy Faye and Tick, Tick... Boom! Lorde discusses her upcoming album, Solar Power.
1103	June 22, 2021	Wanda Sykes, Craig Melvin	N/A
Late Show Presents: Meanwhile. Meanwhile Presents: Breaking Sex Doll News. Wanda Sykes discusses The Upshaws. Craig Melvin discusses his new book, Pops: Learning to Be a Son and a Father.
1104	June 23, 2021	Christine Baranski	Joy Oladokun
Breaking News. Space News: Animal Edition. Space News: Cross-Platform Synergy Edition. Christine Baranski discusses The Good Fight. Stephen and Christine Baranski sing Side by Side by Sondheim. Joy Oladokun performs "Sunday" from her album In Defense of My Own Happiness.
1105	June 24, 2021	Robert Duvall	N/A
The Road To Someday Making A Road. Stephen and his writer Brian Stack congratulate Conan O'Brien on 28 years of late night television. Robert Duvall discusses 12 Mighty Orphans and reminisces his most iconic roles. Late Show Presents: Rehearsal Rewind.
1106	June 28, 2021	Secretary Pete Buttigieg, Katja Herbers	N/A
Late Show Presents: Meanwhile. Pete Buttigieg discusses recent politics. Katja Herbers discusses Evil. Late Show Presents: Rehearsal Rewind.
1107	June 29, 2021	Dominic Monaghan & Billy Boyd	Ali Sultan
The Road To Someday Making A Road. Late Show's Just One Question: F9 Edition (special appearances by Ludacris, Vin Diesel, John Cena, Tyrese Gibson, Helen Mirren, Jordana Brewster and Justin Lin). Dominic Monaghan & Billy Boyd discuss their podcast, The Friendship Onion. Dominic Monaghan and Billy Boyd ask Stephen Lord of the Rings trivia (special appearance by Peter Jackson). Ali Sultan gives a stand-up performance.
1108	June 30, 2021	Harvey Keitel	Randall Otis
The Road To The White House? No! The Last Election Just Ended! And It Nearly Broke Me! I Can't Take This Anymore! Late Show Presents: Meanwhile. Harvey Keitel discusses Lansky. Randall Otis gives a stand up performance. Late Show Presents: Rehearsal Rewind.

=== July ===
No.	Original release date	Guest(s)	Musical/entertainment guest(s)
1109	July 1, 2021	Jim Gaffigan	JP Saxe with John Mayer
Seditionist Round Up Roundup. Breaking Meanwhile. Breaking Peenwhile. Community Calendar: Chesterton, Indiana with Jim Gaffigan. Jim Gaffigan discusses Luca. JP Saxe performs "Here's Hopin'" from his album Dangerous Levels of Introspection, with John Mayer.
1110	July 12, 2021	Keegan-Michael Key	Tones and I
Barack Obama's Summer Playlist. Space News: Branson Edition. Stephen Colbert's Tele-Trends-Ivision. Keegan-Michael Key discusses Schmigadoon! Tones and I performs "Cloudy Day" from her album Welcome to the Madhouse.
1111	July 13, 2021	Sir Richard Branson, Representative Eleanor Holmes Norton	N/A
Astro Al's Discount Space Travel Emporium. Seditionist Round Up Roundup. Seditionist Round Up Roundup Update: Breaking Moos. Late Show Presents: Meanwhile. Sir Richard Branson discusses his flight to the edge of space. Representative Eleanor Holmes Norton discusses recent politics. Late Show Presents: Rehearsal Rewind.
1112	July 14, 2021	Mindy Kaling	Wally Baram
Mindy Kaling discusses Never Have I Ever. Wally Baram gives a stand-up performance.
1113	July 15, 2021	Hugh Jackman	Lorde
Seditionist Round Up Roundup. Late Show Presents: Meanwhile. Hugh Jackman discusses Reminiscence. Lorde performs "Solar Power" from her album of the same name. Late Show Presents: Rehearsal Rewind.
1114	July 19, 2021	Joy Reid	Alessia Cara
The Facebook Variety Show Presents: Vax-Scream! Seditionist Round Up Roundup. Late Show Presents: Meanwhile. Joy Reid discusses recent politics. Alessia Cara performs "Sweet Dream".
1115	July 20, 2021	Jason Sudeikis	Yola
Space News: Bezos Edition. Breaking Taco Alert. Rescue Dog Rescue with Jason Sudeikis. Jason Sudeikis discusses Ted Lasso. Yola performs "Stand for Myself" from her album of the same name, with Jon Batiste providing musical accompaniment. Late Show Presents: Rehearsal Rewind.
1116	July 21, 2021	Emily Blunt, Bob Costas	N/A
Late Show Mitch Niche. Climate: Changed. Emily Blunt discusses A Quiet Place Part II and Jungle Cruise. Bob Costas discusses the upcoming Summer Olympics and Back on the Record.
1117	July 22, 2021	Hannah Einbinder	Alex Falcone
Keep In Mind: Everyone's Fine! Late Show Presents: Meanwhile. The Late Show with Stephen Colbert: The Snyder Cut (special appearance by Zack Snyder; segment rebroadcast from May 26 episode). Hannah Einbinder discusses Hacks. Alex Falcone gives a stand-up performance.

=== August ===
No.	Original release date	Guest(s)	Musical/entertainment guest(s)
1118	August 9, 2021	Stephen King, Winston Duke	N/A
Delta Blues. Late Show Presents: A-List Tub Time with The Soapy Stars. Stephen King discusses recent politics and his new book, Billy Summers. Winston Duke discusses Nine Days.
1119	August 10, 2021	Brian Stelter	Big Red Machine featuring Robin Pecknold and Anaïs Mitchell
Space News: Advertising In Space Edition. Late Show Presents: Meanwhile. President Barack Obama and Stephen play paper basketball (segment rebroadcast from November 24, 2020 episode). Brian Stelter discusses recent politics and his book, Hoax. Big Red Machine performs "Phoenix" from their album How Long Do You Think It's Gonna Last?, featuring Robin Pecknold and Anaïs Mitchell.
1120	August 11, 2021	Alan Alda, Gabriel Iglesias	N/A
Disinformation Station. Stephen Colbert: Number Muncher. Stephen presents new items from his own lifestyle brand, Covetton House: Covetton Med. Alan Alda discusses his podcast, Clear+Vivid. Gabriel Iglesias discusses Space Jam: A New Legacy.
1121	August 12, 2021	Jennifer Hudson	Jennifer Hudson
Late Show Presents: Meanwhile. Jennifer Hudson discusses Respect. Jennifer Hudson performs "Respect". Late Show Presents: Rehearsal Rewind.
1122	August 16, 2021	Dr. Jonathan LaPook	Fumi Abe
Gary's Man Seed Emporium. Stephen acknowledges the Taliban forces' capture of the city of Kabul. Dr. Jonathan LaPook discusses the COVID-19 pandemic. Fumi Abe gives a stand-up performance.
1123	August 17, 2021	Amanda Peet, Roger Bennett	N/A
Stephen speaks with CNN chief international correspondent Clarissa Ward, live from Kabul. Amanda Peet discusses The Chair. Roger Bennett discusses his new book, (Re) Born in the USA.
1124	August 18, 2021	Daniel Radcliffe	Dan + Shay
Seditionist Round Up Roundup. Late Show Presents: Meanwhile. Daniel Radcliffe discusses Miracle Workers and the forthcoming twentieth anniversary of Harry Potter and the Sorcerer's Stone. Turn The Left Bottom Middle Sideways Toward The Front-Facing Part (segment rebroadcast from January 21 episode). Dan + Shay perform "You" from their album Good Things. Late Show Presents: Rehearsal Rewind.
1125	August 19, 2021	Sean & Dylan Penn	Crowded House
Sean Penn and Dylan Penn discuss Flag Day. Crowded House performs "To the Island" from their album Dreamers Are Waiting.

=== September ===
No.	Original release date	Guest(s)	Musical/entertainment guest(s)
1126	September 7, 2021	Steve Martin, Martin Short & Selena Gomez	The War on Drugs
Breaking Mustache Newsflash. Stephen and Jon Batiste acknowledge the impact of Hurricane Ida in Louisiana. Stephen Colbert's "Excuses Song" featuring Jon Batiste & Stay Human. Steve Martin, Martin Short & Selena Gomez discuss Only Murders in the Building. The War on Drugs perform "Living Proof" from their album I Don't Live Here Anymore. Late Show Presents: Rehearsal Rewind.
1127	September 8, 2021	Chris Wallace, Holland Taylor	N/A
Animal Earth. Italy Cam. "Stephen Colbert Presents: That's Yeet. Dabbing on Fleek, Man!" Chris Wallace discusses recent politics and his new book, Countdown Bin Laden. Holland Taylor discusses The Chair.
1128	September 9, 2021	Sarah Paulson, Kacey Musgraves	N/A
Seditionist Round Up Roundup. Late Show Presents: Meanwhile. A special appearance by Blue's Clues' original host Steve Burns. Sarah Paulson discusses Impeachment: American Crime Story. Kacey Musgraves discusses her new album, Star-Crossed.
1129	September 13, 2021	Jeff Daniels, Nate Burleson	N/A
Stephen and Jon Batiste acknowledge the death of George Wein. Jeff Daniels discusses American Rust. Nate Burleson discusses CBS Mornings.
1130	September 14, 2021	Justice Stephen Breyer	N/A
Stephen acknowledges the death of Norm Macdonald. Late Show Presents: Meanwhile. Meanwhile Presents: Pleistocene-While. Pleistocene-While Presents: Suckmyass-While. Justice Stephen Breyer discusses recent politics and his new book, The Authority of Court and the Peril of Politics. Late Show Presents: Rehearsal Rewind.
1131	September 15, 2021	Jessica Chastain, Stephen Sondheim	N/A
The Adventures of Mike Pence: To Coup or Not to Coup. Stephen Colbert's Ball Gags. The Late Chic Presents: Stephen Colbert's Slay Your Fleek. Jessica Chastain discusses The Eyes of Tammy Faye. Stephen Sondheim discusses Company and West Side Story.
1132	September 16, 2021	Melissa McCarthy	Lindsey Buckingham
Space News: Civilians In Space Edition. Disinformation Station. Late Show Presents: Meanwhile. Melissa McCarthy discusses The Starling and the 10th anniversary of Bridesmaids. Lindsey Buckingham performs "On the Wrong Side" from his self-titled album.
Special	September 20, 2021	Neil deGrasse Tyson	N/A
The Late Show's Celebration of Season 6: This Time with Laughs! Special clip show with The Late Show's best Season 6 moments: monologues, Quarantine-While and Colbert Questionert segments and best guest appearances. Neil deGrasse Tyson takes "The Colbert Questionert" (new footage from March 2 episode).
1133	September 21, 2021	Bob Woodward & Robert Costa	Leon Bridges
Late Show Presents: Meanwhile. Bob Woodward & Robert Costa discuss recent politics and their new book, Peril. Leon Bridges performs "Motorbike" from his album Gold-Diggers Sound.
1134	September 22, 2021	Shawn Mendes	Chris Turner
Climate Night. Shawn Mendes discusses climate change action and his new single, "Summer of Love". Chris Turner gives a stand-up performance.
1135	September 23, 2021	Anderson Cooper	John Mayer
Disinformation Station. Late Show Presents: Meanwhile. The Late Chic Presents: Stephen Colbert's Slay Your Fleek. Anderson Cooper discusses his new book, Vanderbilt: The Rise and Fall of an American Dynasty. John Mayer performs "Wild Blue" from his album Sob Rock.
1136	September 27, 2021	Jon Stewart, Paul Giamatti	N/A
Breaking News. Jon Stewart takes "The Colbert Questionert" (new footage from June 14 episode). Paul Giamatti discusses Billions.
1137	September 28, 2021	Drew Carey, Phoebe Robinson	N/A
The Late Show's Presidential Butt-tastic Ass-Travaganza: How Full of Crap Is He? Scandinavia's Björking Nus. Late Show Presents: Meanwhile. Meanwhile Presents: Meanwild. Meanwild Presents: Meanwild After Dark. Drew Carey discusses The Price Is Right and the show's upcoming 50th anniversary. Phoebe Robinson discusses her new book, Please Don't Sit On My Bed In Your Outside Clothes. Late Show Presents: Rehearsal Rewind.
1138	September 29, 2021	Anita Hill, Alessandro Nivola	N/A
Apocalypse Dow: Countdown To Shutdown: Wanted: Debt or Alive. Stephen Colbert: Selling Out. Anita Hill discusses her new book, Believing. Alessandro Nivola discusses The Many Saints of Newark. Late Show Presents: Rehearsal Rewind.
1139	September 30, 2021	John Lithgow	Theo Croker featuring Wyclef Jean
Apocalypse Dow: Countdown To Shutdown: Wanted: Debt or Alive. A surprise visit by Rudy Giuliani. John Lithgow discusses his new book, A Confederacy of Dumptys, and Killers of the Flower Moon. Theo Croker performs "State of the Union 444" from his album BLK2LIFE, featuring Wyclef Jean and with Jon Batiste providing musical accompaniment.

=== October ===
No.	Original release date	Guest(s)	Musical/entertainment guest(s)
1140	October 1, 2021	Rebecca Ferguson	N/A
Seditionist Round Up Roundup. Stephen's Apology Fest in Milwaukee, Wisconsin (special appearances by Pat Murphy and Brent Suter). Rebecca Ferguson discusses Dune.
1141	October 4, 2021	Julianna Margulies	Toby Keith
Rich People – They're Just Not Like Us: Us Pay Taxes. Kroggett's Haunted Truck Translation Dictionary (special appearance by David Harbour). Julianna Margulies discusses The Morning Show and her book, Sunshine Girl: An Unexpected Life. Toby Keith performs "Old School" from his forthcoming album Peso In My Pocket.
1142	October 5, 2021	Michael Keaton	Zac Brown Band
The Social Notwork. Late Show Presents: Meanwhile. Michael Keaton discusses The Flash and Dopesick. Zac Brown Band performs "Out in the Middle" from their album The Comeback.
1143	October 6, 2021	Bret Baier, Susie Essman	N/A
Apocalypse Dow: Countdown To Meltdown: Dawn of the Debt. Critical Possible News? Crisis In Possibly! Breaking Maybe? Urgent Perhaps? Hispanic Heritage Month: Latino, Latinx, or Hispanic? (special appearances by José Andrés, America Ferrera, Rita Moreno, Danny Trejo and Cristo Fernández). Bret Baier discusses the 25th anniversary of Fox News, recent politics, and his new book, To Rescue the Republic. Susie Essman discusses Curb Your Enthusiasm. Late Show Presents: Rehearsal Rewind.
1144	October 7, 2021	Dr. Sanjay Gupta, Denis Villeneuve	N/A
Late Show Presents: Meanwhile. Dr. Sanjay Gupta discusses the COVID-19 pandemic and his new book, World War C. Denis Villeneuve discusses Dune.
1145	October 8, 2021	The cast of Succession	N/A
Stephen Colbert Presents The Best Moments From 25 Years of Fox News. Space News: Speedy Space Rock Edition. Space News: The Trekking Stars of Star Trek Edition. Space News: Space Race Sequel Edition. The cast of Succession (Brian Cox, Kieran Culkin, J. Smith-Cameron, Sarah Snook, Matthew Macfadyen, Nicholas Braun and Alan Ruck) discusses the show and answers questions from social media.
1146	October 18, 2021	Representative Adam Schiff	Kacey Musgraves
Wet Virginia. Stephen presents new items from his own lifestyle brand, Covetton House: Summit-ton House. Representative Adam Schiff discusses recent politics and his new book, Midnight in Washington. Kacey Musgraves performs "Breadwinner" from her album Star-Crossed. Late Show Presents: Rehearsal Rewind.
1147	October 19, 2021	Nick Offerman, Charlamagne tha God	N/A
Cargo Unchained. Disinformation Station. Late Show Presents: Meanwhile. Nick Offerman discusses his new book, Where the Deer and the Antelope Play. Charlamagne tha God discusses Tha God's Honest Truth and recent politics.
1148	October 20, 2021	Issa Rae	H.E.R.
Stephen Colbert's Book Club: For People Who Want To Sound Like They Read The Book At Their Book Club. Issa Rae discusses Insecure. The Late Show Halloween Wiggle, featuring Run the Jewels. H.E.R. performs "For Anyone" from her album Back of My Mind. Late Show Presents: Rehearsal Rewind.
1149	October 21, 2021	Timothée Chalamet & Zendaya	N/A
Trolley Museum After Dark. Late Show Presents: Meanwhile. Timothée Chalamet & Zendaya discuss Dune. Duner or Later? Late Show Presents: Rehearsal Rewind.
1150	October 22, 2021	Andie MacDowell	Lana Del Rey
Cargo Unchained: Holiday Edition. Disinformation Station. Seditionist Round Up Roundup. Rescue Dog Rescue with Nick Offerman (new footage from October 19 episode). The Late Show's How-Tooo-Weeeen: Pumpkin Carving Edition. Andie MacDowell discusses Maid. Lana Del Rey performs "Arcadia" from her album Blue Banisters.
1151	October 25, 2021	Bruce Springsteen	Bruce Springsteen
Breaking Nearly News. Breaking Could-Be-Something. Bruce Springsteen discusses his new book, Renegades: Born in the USA; and his upcoming album, The Legendary 1979 No Nukes Concerts. Bruce Springsteen performs "The River".
1152	October 26, 2021	Katie Couric	Gabby Barrett
Cargo Unchained: British Edition. Late Show Presents: Meanwhile. Meanwhile Presents: Halloween-While. Katie Couric discusses her career and her new book, Going There. Gabby Barrett performs "Footprints on the Moon" from her album Goldmine.
1153	October 27, 2021	Elizabeth Banks, Jorja Fox	N/A
A PSA from the National Association for Drug-Free Kids. Booze Newz! Late Show Wine Club. Elizabeth Banks discusses her new podcast, My Body, My Podcast. Jorja Fox discusses CSI: Vegas. Late Show Presents: Rehearsal Rewind.
1154	October 28, 2021	John Leguizamo, Thomasin McKenzie	N/A
Late Show Presents: Meanwhile. John Leguizamo discusses recent politics and his new comic book series, PhenomX. Thomasin McKenzie discusses Last Night in Soho.
1155	October 29, 2021	Trevor Noah	My Morning Jacket
Space News: Space For Rent Edition. First Drafts: Halloween Cards. Trevor Noah discusses The Daily Show. My Morning Jacket performs "Love Love Love" from their self-titled album.

=== November ===
No.	Original release date	Guest(s)	Musical/entertainment guest(s)
1156	November 1, 2021	Huma Abedin, David Byrne	American Utopia
Romansplaining with Stephen Colbert. Huma Abedin discusses her new book, Both / And: A Life in Many Worlds. David Byrne discusses American Utopia. David Byrne and the cast of American Utopia perform "I Zimbra".
1157	November 2, 2021	Michael C. Hall, Michael Eric Dyson	N/A
Space News: Plumbing Edition. Space News: Space Tacos Edition. Late Show Presents: Meanwhile. Michael C. Hall discusses Dexter: New Blood. Michael Eric Dyson discusses his new book, Entertaining Race: Performing Blackness in America.
1158	November 3, 2021	Andy Cohen	Thundercat
Ibrahim Maalouf sits in with the band and provides musical accompaniment. The Q Files: The Truth is Out There, The Lies Are Way Out There. Andy Cohen discusses his new book, Glitter Every Day. Thundercat performs "Dragonball Durag" from his album It Is What It Is, with Jon Batiste providing musical accompaniment.
1159	November 4, 2021	Billy Porter, Annaleigh Ashford	N/A
Kris Kringle in... A Very COVID Christmas. Kenny Garrett sits in with the band and provides musical accompaniment. Late Show Presents: Meanwhile. Billy Porter discusses his new book, Unprotected, and apologizes for his comments about Harry Styles in a dress on the cover of Vogue. Annaleigh Ashford discusses B Positive.
1160	November 5, 2021	Tony Hale	Snail Mail
Seditionist Round Up Roundup. Stephen's Re-Education Camp. The Power Brokers Who Helped COVID Go Viral. Tony Hale discusses Clifford the Big Red Dog. Snail Mail performs "Valentine" from their album of the same name.
1161	November 8, 2021	Jonathan Karl, Brandi Carlile	Brandi Carlile
Jonathan Karl discusses recent politics and his new book, Betrayal. Brandi Carlile discusses her new album, In These Silent Days. Brandi Carlile performs "This Time Tomorrow".
1162	November 9, 2021	Quentin Tarantino	N/A
Cargo Unchained: High Steaks Edition. Seditionist Round Up Roundup: Congressional Edition. Stephen reveals Paul Rudd as People's "Sexiest Man Alive" 2021. Quentin Tarantino discusses his new book, Once Upon a Time in Hollywood.
1163	November 10, 2021	Bruce Springsteen, Aubrey Plaza	N/A
Cargo Unchained. Stephen Colbert's Dil-Do's & Dil-Don'ts. Bruce Springsteen takes "The Colbert Questionert" (new footage from October 25 episode). Aubrey Plaza discusses her new book, The Legend of the Christmas Witch, and plays "Tea at the Plaza". Late Show Presents: Rehearsal Rewind.
1164	November 11, 2021	Kenneth Branagh, Ellie Kemper	N/A
Late Show Presents: Meanwhile. Kenneth Branagh discusses Belfast. Ellie Kemper discusses Home Sweet Home Alone.
1165	November 12, 2021	Jeff Goldblum	Rod Stewart
Seditionist Round Up Roundup. Late Show's Uninformed Correspondent: Sex Party Edition. Jeff Goldblum discusses The World According to Jeff Goldblum. Rod Stewart performs "One More Time" from his album The Tears of Hercules.
1166	November 15, 2021	Paul Rudd	Sting
He's Just Not That Into You Cam. Paul Rudd discusses his status as People's "Sexiest Man Alive" 2021 and Ghostbusters: Afterlife. Sting performs "Rushing Water" from his album The Bridge.
1167	November 16, 2021	Mayor-elect Eric Adams, Dwyane Wade	N/A
Late Show Presents: Meanwhile. Meanwhile Presents: Urinewhile. Mayor-elect Eric Adams discusses recent politics. Dwyane Wade discusses his new book, Dwyane.
1168	November 17, 2021	Adam Driver, America Ferrera	N/A
C-SPANIME. The Q Files: The Truth is Out There, Way Out There. Late Show's Just One Question: WWE Edition (special appearances by Bianca Belair, The Miz, Seth Rollins, Becky Lynch, Randy Orton, Big E and The Street Profits). Adam Driver discusses House of Gucci. America Ferrera discusses Gentefied.
1169	November 19, 2021	Kevin Hart	Robert Plant & Alison Krauss
Late Show Presents: Meanwhile. Kevin Hart discusses Hart to Heart and True Story. Robert Plant & Alison Krauss perform "Can't Let Go" from their album Raise the Roof.
1170	November 22, 2021	Andrew Garfield, José Andrés	N/A
Andrew Garfield discusses Tick, Tick... Boom! Chef José Andrés steps into the kitchen with Stephen.
1171	November 23, 2021	Lady Gaga	Lady Gaga & Tony Bennett
Stephen congratulates Jon Batiste on his eleven Grammy nominations. Lady Gaga discusses House of Gucci. Lady Gaga & Tony Bennett perform "Anything Goes".
1172	November 24, 2021	Rosamund Pike, Peter Jackson	N/A
Big Frank's Used Turkeys. Rich People – They're Just Not Like Us: Us Pay Taxes. Late Show Presents: Meanwhile. Rosamund Pike discusses The Wheel of Time. Peter Jackson discusses The Beatles: Get Back.
1173	November 29, 2021	Peter Jackson	Chelsea Cutler
Miracle on 34th Street.com. #ColbertSmallBizBump (special appearance by Nick Offerman). Late Show Hanukkah Classics. Peter Jackson discusses The Beatles: Get Back (new footage from November 24 episode). Chelsea Cutler performs "Devil on My Shoulder" from her album When I Close My Eyes. Late Show Presents: Rehearsal Rewind.
1174	November 30, 2021	Peter Dinklage, Lee Jung-jae	Peter Dinklage and Aaron & Bryce Dessner
The Q Files: The Truth is Out There, Way Out There. Late Show Presents: Meanwhile. Peter Dinklage discusses Cyrano. Lee Jung-jae discusses Squid Game. Peter Dinklage, Aaron Dessner & Bryce Dessner perform "Your Name", from the film Cyrano.

=== December ===
No.	Original release date	Guest(s)	Musical/entertainment guest(s)
1175	December 1, 2021	Javier Bardem	Gang of Youths
The Real House Members of Capitol Hill. Stephen presents new items from his own lifestyle brand, Covetton House. Javier Bardem discusses Being the Ricardos, The Good Boss and Dune. Gang of Youths performs "The Angel of 8th Ave." from their album Angel in Realtime.
1176	December 2, 2021	Mahershala Ali, Jason Reynolds	N/A
Hangoton. Mahershala Ali discusses Blade and Swan Song. Jason Reynolds discusses his new book, Stuntboy, in the Meantime.
1177	December 3, 2021	Jeff Goldblum	N/A
Cargo Unchained: Booze Edition. Seditionist Round Up Roundup. Late Show Presents: Meanwhile. Jeff Goldblum takes "The Colbert Questionert" (new footage from November 12 episode). Stephen acknowledges the death of Stephen Sondheim (segment rebroadcast from September 15 episode).
1178	December 6, 2021	Jennifer Lawrence	Nathaniel Rateliff and the Night Sweats
Cargo Unchained. Cyborgasm. Jennifer Lawrence discusses Don't Look Up. Nathaniel Rateliff and the Night Sweats perform "The Future" from their album of the same name.
1179	December 7, 2021	Kristin Davis & Cynthia Nixon	Glass Animals
Late Show Presents: Meanwhile. Kristin Davis & Cynthia Nixon discuss recent politics and And Just Like That... Glass Animals perform "Heat Waves" from their album Dreamland. Late Show Presents: Rehearsal Rewind.
1180	December 8, 2021	Dr. David Agus	Natalie Hemby
Romansplaining with Stephen Colbert. Dr. David Agus discusses the COVID-19 pandemic. Natalie Hemby performs "Pins and Needles" from her album of the same name.
1181	December 9, 2021	Michael B. Jordan	Jon Batiste & Nathaniel Rateliff
Late Show Presents: Meanwhile. Michael B. Jordan discusses A Journal for Jordan. Jon Batiste & Nathaniel Rateliff perform a special rendition of "Run Rudolph Run".
1182	December 10, 2021	Sting, David Alan Grier	N/A
Space News: More Billionaires Edition. Mooooon Newwwws. Stephen Colbert's Clock Gobblers. Seditionist Round Up Roundup. First Drafts: Holiday Cards. Sting takes "The Colbert Questionert" (new footage from November 15 episode). David Alan Grier discusses Joe Pickett.
1183	December 13, 2021	Keanu Reeves	Brett Eldredge
Stephen acknowledges the damage in Western Kentucky. Stephen Colbert's I Could Self-Care Less. Jazz Cowboy: Cyber (special appearance by Paul Giamatti). Keanu Reeves discusses The Matrix Resurrections and BRZRKR. Brett Eldredge performs "Mr. Christmas" from his album of the same name.
1184	December 14, 2021	Henry Cavill, Jonathan Groff	N/A
Seditionist Round Up Roundup. Late Show Presents: Meanwhile. Stephen Colbert's XXX-Mas. Henry Cavill discusses The Witcher. Jonathan Groff discusses The Matrix Resurrections and the 15th anniversary of Spring Awakening.
1185	December 15, 2021	Denzel Washington, Maggie Gyllenhaal	N/A
Frankenclaus. A musical tribute to the 20th anniversary of The Lord of the Rings: "#1 Trilly" (special appearances by Dominic Monaghan, Billy Boyd, Sean Astin, Elijah Wood, Anna Kendrick, Method Man, Killer Mike, Orlando Bloom, Andy Serkis and Hugo Weaving). Denzel Washington discusses The Tragedy of Macbeth. Maggie Gyllenhaal discusses The Lost Daughter.
1186	December 16, 2021	Anderson Cooper	N/A
Late Show Presents: A Conspiracy Carol. Anderson Cooper discusses recent politics and his upcoming coverage of CNN's live New Year's Eve show.
