= Sacrifice (Bebe Rexha song) =

2021 single by Bebe Rexha

Single by Bebe Rexha

from the album Better Mistakes
- Released: March 5, 2021
- Genre: Dance; eurodance; nu-disco; pop
- Length: 2:40
- Label: Warner
- Songwriters: Bebe Rexha; Burns; Pablo Bowman; Peter Rycroft
- Producer: Burns

Bebe Rexha singles chronology
"Baby, I'm Jealous" (2020)	"Sacrifice" (2021)	"Sabotage" (2021)

Music video
- "Sacrifice" on YouTube

Logo
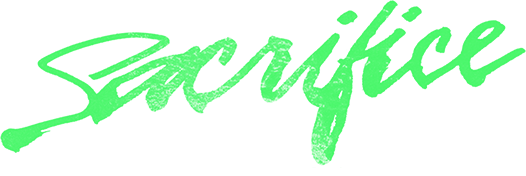

"Sacrifice" is a song by American singer-songwriter Bebe Rexha from her second studio album, Better Mistakes (2021). The song was written by Rexha, Burns, Pablo Bowman and Peter Rycroft, and produced by Burns. Warner released it as the second single from the album for digital download and streaming in various countries on March 5, 2021. Combining dance, eurodance, nu-disco and pop music, the song explores the desire to live a love and the pursuit of a man's attention. It garnered a warm reception from music critics for its music, lyrics and Rexha's vocal delivery.

"Sacrifice" reached number two on the US Billboard Dance/Mix Show Airplay ranking and attained positions within the top 30 on the Adult Top 40 and Mainstream Top 40 charts. It peaked at number one in Hungary and number five in Poland, earning a gold certification from the Polish Society of the Phonographic Industry (ZPAV). The vampire-themed music video, with references to Blade (1998) and The Matrix (1999), premiered on Rexha's YouTube channel on March 5. The video displays the singer as a bloodthirsty vampire leading women through a hospital rampage and a Blade-inspired club ambiance.

== Background and composition ==
Leading up to its release, Rexha declared her intention to publish a song dedicated to the LGBTQ community, saying, "I'm gonna give the gays everything they want on this one song." This initiative was prompted by her best friend and stylist, Wilford Lenov, who advocated for the creation of a "gay anthem". On March 1, 2021, the singer announced the forthcoming release of "Sacrifice" and published its cover art across her social media channels. The artwork had a futuristic design with references to the American film The Matrix (1999). Subsequently on March 5, Warner released "Sacrifice" for digital download and streaming as the second single from Rexha's second studio album Better Mistakes (2021). The song was written by Rexha, Burns, Pablo Bowman and Peter Rycroft, with the production completed by Burns. Harmonising dance, eurodance, nü-disco and pop music, it explores the desire to live a love and the pursuit of a man's attention. These emotions find expression in lyrics such as "Now you're mine, Tell me what you're willing to sacrifice, oh sacrifice, When it comes to me, I don't want no compromise."

== Reception ==
Upon release, "Sacrifice" garnered a warm reception from music critics. In her critique for The Forty-Five, Kate French-Morris highlighted it as the standout song on the album, citing its compelling qualities and noting its distinctive "Real McCoy-style" rap outro. Jon Caramanica from The New York Times observed Rexha adopting a "whispering diva" persona and similarly recognising the inspiration of German group Real McCoy's single "Another Night" (1993). Sam Damshenas of Gay Times acclaimed the song as a "pulsating and club-ready anthem", underscoring Rexha's successful realisation of her commitment to meeting the desires of the LGBTQ+ community, as evident in the positive reception of the song. A writer for Billboard Argentina characterised the song as "electrifying". In a review for Equate, the writer commended Rexha's "shimmering" vocal delivery, highlighting the instrumental arrangement, and noting the song's potential to captivate both club audiences and the main stage of Coachella. A contributor for Laluna complimented Rexha as a notable and bold experimenter, demonstrating a willingness to explore new directions.

"Sacrifice" attained number two on the US Billboard Dance/Mix Show Airplay ranking, also entering the top 30 on the Adult Top 40 and Mainstream Top 40 charts. Topping the charts in Hungary, the song reached number five in Poland, number 22 in the Czech Republic, number 45 in Croatia, number 62 in the Netherlands and number 65 in the Commonwealth of Independent States. In the year-end compilations of 2021, "Sacrifice" achieved placements in Hungary, Poland and the US Dance/Mix Show Airplay ranking. In July 2022, the song received a gold certification from the Polish Society of the Phonographic Industry (ZPAV) for shifting more than 25,000 units in Poland.

== Music video and promotion ==
The music video of "Sacrifice" features Rexha as a bloodthirsty vampire leading women through a hospital rampage.

The music video for "Sacrifice" premiered on Rexha's official YouTube channel on March 5, 2021, with behind-the-scenes footage from the video published on March 16. Directed by Christian Breslauer, the two-minute and 49-second video incorporates a vampire-themed narrative with references to the American films Blade (1998) and The Matrix. Rexha plays a bloodthirsty vampire leading a group of women as they navigate through a hospital rampage and indulge within a Blade-inspired club setting, marked by cascading blood from the roof. The video narrative commences with a sequence depicting an injured and restrained man coupled with Rexha's authoritative presence as she approaches and delivers a performance in close proximity to the captive individual. Then, it transitions to Rexha guiding the group through a hospital corridor, orchestrating a sequence involving the incapacitation of hospital staff, the assumption of control over the facility and the securing of access to a laboratory for the consumption of blood. The video culminates in a nightclub setting filled with partying people with a display of floating blood from above. Leticia Romero from Radiotelevisión Española (RTVE) highlighted the video's aesthetic and its evocation of a domina-styled artist accompanied by a group of vampiric women, collectively portraying a narrative of a blood-stained mission involving the act of "sacrificing a man".

The release of "Sacrifice" was accompanied by remixes from American duo Niiko x Swae, British duo Gorgon City and producer Nathan Dawe, with these versions being published between April and May 2021. Also in April, Rexha premiered the song during a virtual performance on the seventh season of American talk show The Late Show with Stephen Colbert. Adorned in a black latex suit and gloves, the singer was accompanied by her band and two dancers during the performance. Emily Zemler from Rolling Stone noted that the presentation conveyed a style reminiscent of "vintage Madonna".

== Track listing ==
- Digital download and streaming
1. "Sacrifice" – 2:40
- Digital download and streaming – Remixes
1. "Satellite" (Gorgon City Remix) – 3:44
2. "Satellite" (Nathan Dawe Remix) – 2:28
3. "Satellite" (Niiko x Swae Remix) – 2:32

== Credits and personnel ==
Credits adapted from Spotify and Tidal.

- Bebe Rexha – lead artist, lead vocals, songwriting
- Burns – production, all instruments, recording, songwriting
- Pablo Bowman – songwriting, backing vocals
- Peter Rycroft – songwriting
- Tom Norris – mixing
- Colin Leonard – mastering

== Charts ==
=== Weekly charts ===
Weekly chart performance for "Sacrifice"
Chart (2021)	Peak position
Belgium (Ultratip Bubbling Under Flanders)	10
CIS (TopHit)	65
Croatia (HRT)	45
Czech Republic Airplay (ČNS IFPI)	22
Hungary (Dance Top 40)	14
Hungary (Rádiós Top 40)	1
Hungary (Single Top 40)	32
Netherlands (Dutch Top 40)	39
Netherlands (Single Top 100)	62
New Zealand Hot Singles (RMNZ)	17
Poland Airplay (ZPAV)	5
Russia Airplay (TopHit)	119
UK Singles Downloads (Official Charts)	69
US Adult Pop Airplay (Billboard)	25
US Dance Airplay (Billboard)	2
US Pop Airplay (Billboard)	29

=== Monthly charts ===
Monthly chart performance for "Sacrifice"
Chart (2021)	Peak position
CIS (TopHit)	74

=== Year-end charts ===
2021 year-end chart performance for "Sacrifice"
Chart (2021)	Position
Hungary (Dance Top 100)	58
Hungary (Rádiós Top 100)	68
Poland (ZPAV)	27
US Dance/Mix Show Airplay (Billboard)	8

2022 year-end chart performance for "Sacrifice"
Chart (2022)	Position
Hungary (Dance Top 100)	30
Hungary (Rádiós Top 100)	26

2023 year-end chart performance for "Sacrifice"
Chart (2023)	Position
Hungary (Dance Top 40)	48

== Certifications ==
Certifications for "Sacrifice"
Region	Certification	Certified units/sales
Poland (ZPAV)	Gold	25,000^{‡}
^{‡} Sales+streaming figures based on certification alone.

== Release history ==
Release dates and formats for "Sacrifice"
Region	Date	Format(s)	Label	Ref.
Various	March 5, 2021	Digital download; streaming	Warner	
United Kingdom	March 5, 2021	Digital download; streaming	Warner	
United States	March 22, 2021	Hot adult contemporary	Warner	
