= Baby, I'm Jealous =

2020 single by Bebe Rexha featuring Doja Cat

Single by Bebe Rexha featuring Doja Cat

from the album Better Mistakes
- Released: October 9, 2020
- Recorded: 2019
- Genre: Pop; R&B; hip hop; disco
- Length: 2:55
- Label: Warner
- Composers: Jussi Karvinen; Jason Gill
- Lyricists: Bleta Rexha; Justin Tranter; Pablo Bowman; Amala Dlamani
- Producers: Jussifer; Gill

Bebe Rexha singles chronology
"You Can't Stop the Girl" (2019)	"Baby, I'm Jealous" (2020)	"Sacrifice" (2021)

Doja Cat singles chronology
"Del Mar" (2020)	"Baby, I'm Jealous" (2020)	"Best Friend" (2021)

Music video
- "Baby, I'm Jealous" on YouTube

"Baby, I'm Jealous" is a song by American singer-songwriter Bebe Rexha featuring fellow American rapper and singer Doja Cat, released as the lead single from the former's second studio album Better Mistakes on October 9, 2020. A remix featuring Dominican singer Natti Natasha was released on November 27, 2020.

== Background ==
On September 23, 2020, the song was registered on Shazam and was said to be a collaboration with Doja Cat. On October 4, Apple Music showed that the song would release on October 9. Rexha later posted on social media that she would make a "special announcement". The next day, she announced the release with the cover and link to pre-save the single.

== Music video ==
An accompanying music video for the song was shot in September 2020. The song's video was directed by Hannah Lux Davis and includes cameos from social media personalities Nikita Dragun, Charli D'Amelio and Avani Gregg. It was released on the same day as the song.

== Live performances ==
The song was first performed by Bebe Rexha and Doja Cat on The Tonight Show Starring Jimmy Fallon on October 19, 2020. Bebe also performed a solo version of the song on November 26, 2020, at the 94th Annual Macy's Thanksgiving Day Parade. She performed the song with Doja Cat on November 22 at the 2020 American Music Awards.

== Credits and personnel ==
Credits adapted from Tidal and YouTube.

Personnel

- Bebe Rexha — main artist, lead vocals, writer
- Doja Cat — featured artist, vocals, writer
- Jason Gill — producer, writer
- Jussifer — producer, writer
- Justin Tranter — writer
- Pablo Bowman — writer
- Jaycen Joshua — mixing
- Colin Leonard — mastering

== Charts ==
Chart performance for "Baby, I'm Jealous"
Chart (2020)	Peak position
Belgium (Ultratip Bubbling Under Flanders)	10
Belgium (Ultratip Bubbling Under Wallonia)	4
Canada (Canadian Hot 100)	60
Canada CHR/Top 40 (Billboard)	25
Canada Hot AC (Billboard)	41
Global 200 (Billboard)	56
France Singles Sales Chart (SNEP)	164
Greece (IFPI)	86
Ireland (IRMA)	59
Mexico Airplay (Billboard)	44
New Zealand Hot Singles (RMNZ)	4
Portugal (AFP)	175
Romania (Airplay 100)	42
UK Singles (OCC)	86
US Billboard Hot 100	58
US Adult Pop Airplay (Billboard)	27
US Pop Airplay (Billboard)	21

== Certifications ==
Certifications for "Baby, I'm Jealous"
Region	Certification	Certified units/sales
United States (RIAA)	Gold	500,000^{‡}
^{‡} Sales+streaming figures based on certification alone.

== Release history ==
Release history and formats for "Baby, I'm Jealous"
Region	Date	Format(s)	Version(s)	Label(s)	Ref.
Various	October 9, 2020	Digital download; streaming	Original	Warner	
Various	October 9, 2020	Digital download; streaming	A Cappella	Warner	
Various	October 9, 2020	Digital download; streaming	Instrumental	Warner	
Various	October 9, 2020	Digital download; streaming	Radio edit	Warner	
United States	October 20, 2020	Contemporary hit radio	Original	Warner	
United States	October 23, 2020	Dance radio; hot adult contemporary	Hot AC radio edit; solo	Warner	
United States	November 9, 2020	Hot adult contemporary	Solo	Warner	
Various	November 27, 2020	Digital download; streaming	Natti Natasha remix	Warner	
Various	December 11, 2020	Digital download; streaming	Stripped	Warner	
