= List of The Late Show with Stephen Colbert episodes (2020) =

- No. of episodes: 164 (and 3 specials)

Release
- Original network: CBS
- Original release: January 6 – December 18, 2020

Season chronology
- ← Previous; 2019 episodes Next → 2021 episodes

This is the list of The Late Show with Stephen Colbert episodes that aired in 2020. Beginning on March 30, Colbert, as with other late night show hosts, took to filming at home due to the COVID-19 pandemic in the United States under the banner of A Late Show with Stephen Colbert. House band Stay Human did not perform, other than bandleader Jon Batiste playing piano from his residence. Beginning on August 10, Colbert resumed filming in the building that houses the Ed Sullivan Theater, from a "converted storage room eight floors" above the regular set in the Ed Sullivan Theater, without a live audience.

== 2020 ==
=== January ===
No.	Original release date	Guest(s)	Musical/entertainment guest(s)
855	January 6, 2020	Jane Fonda, Tan France	Miranda Lambert
America At Whaaa?: Crisis With Iran, In Iraq, About Iran. Jane Fonda discusses her political activism and Grace and Frankie. Tan France discusses Next In Fashion. Miranda Lambert performs "Tequila Does" from her album Wildcard.
856	January 7, 2020	Rose Byrne & Bobby Cannavale, Jamie Oliver	Kate Willett
Pottillo's Pot Dogs. Chair Chat. Don and the Giant Impeach. Late Show Presents: Meanwhile. Rose Byrne & Bobby Cannavale discuss Medea and Like a Boss. Jamie Oliver steps into the kitchen with Stephen and discusses his new book, Ultimate Veg. Kate Willett gives a stand-up performance.
857	January 8, 2020	Larry David	Pedro González
Donald Trump's Super Bowl Ad. It's (Not) World War III! Late Show's All Is Well Alarm. Larry David discusses Curb Your Enthusiasm. Pedro Gonzalez gives a stand-up performance.
858	January 9, 2020	Senator Bernie Sanders, Penn Badgley	N/A
Senator Bernie Sanders discusses recent politics and his 2020 presidential campaign. Penn Badgley discusses You.
859	January 10, 2020	Laura Dern, Kesha	Kesha featuring Big Freedia
Stephen acknowledges the wildfires currently happening in Australia. Late Show Presents: Meanwhile. Laura Dern discusses Marriage Story and Little Women. Kesha discusses her new cosmetics line and her forthcoming album, High Road. Kesha performs "Raising Hell", featuring Big Freedia.
860	January 13, 2020	Joe Scarborough & Mika Brzezinski	Tina: The Tina Turner Musical
Stephen Colbert's interview of Laura Ingraham's interview of President Trump. Fury Road To The White House 2020. Stephen presents new items from his own lifestyle brand, Covetton House. Joe Scarborough & Mika Brzesinski discuss recent politics; Brzesinski also discusses her new book, Comeback Careers. The cast of Tina: The Tina Turner Musical performs "River Deep – Mountain High".
861	January 14, 2020	Michael Bloomberg	N/A
Special live episode following the seventh official Democratic debate. Survivor: Iowa. Don and the Giant Impeach. Michael Bloomberg discusses recent politics and his 2020 presidential campaign. Late Show Presents: Audience Questions.
862	January 15, 2020	Andrew Yang, Abby McEnany	N/A
Don and the Giant Impeach. Late Show Presents: Meanwhile. Meanwhile Presents: Mooooon Newwwws. Andrew Yang discusses recent politics and his 2020 presidential campaign. Abby McEnany discusses Work in Progress.
863	January 16, 2020	Josh Gad, Tamron Hall	Tiana Major9 featuring EarthGang
Don and the Giant Impeach. Late Show Presents: Meanwhile. Josh Gad discusses Avenue 5. Tamron Hall discusses Tamron Hall. Tiana Major9 & EarthGang perform "Collide" from the film Queen & Slim, with Jon Batiste & Stay Human providing musical accompaniment.
864	January 20, 2020	Jim Gaffigan, Tom Steyer	N/A
Darius Lighthouse's Acting School of Legal Acting. Don and the Giant Impeach. Jim Gaffigan discusses Troop Zero. Tom Steyer discusses recent politics and his 2020 presidential campaign.
865	January 21, 2020	Patrick Stewart, Dick Cavett	N/A
C-SPAN: After Dark. Don and the Giant Impeach. Late Show Presents: Meanwhile. Patrick Stewart discusses Star Trek: Picard. Dick Cavett discusses Ali & Cavett: The Tale of the Tapes.
866	January 22, 2020	John Mulaney	N/A
Don and the Giant Impeach. John Mulaney discusses John Mulaney & the Sack Lunch Bunch. Late Show Presents: Rehearsal Rewind.
867	January 23, 2020	Chris Cuomo, David Alan Grier	N/A
Don and the Giant Impeach. Fury Road To The White House 2020. Jon Stewart makes a special appearance from under Stephen's desk to present a preview of his new film, Irresistible. Chris Cuomo discusses recent politics and Cuomo Prime Time. David Alan Grier discusses A Soldier's Play.
868	January 28, 2020	Antonio Banderas, Jay Hernandez	N/A
Don and the Giant Impeach. Jon Batiste and Stephen acknowledge the death of Kobe Bryant. Antonio Banderas discusses Pain and Glory and A Chorus Line. Jay Hernandez discusses Magnum P.I..
869	January 29, 2020	Steve Martin	Steep Canyon Rangers
Don and the Giant Impeach. Late Show Presents: Meanwhile. Steve Martin and Stephen acknowledge the death of Terry Jones. Steve Martin responds to fan mail. Steve Martin and the Steep Canyon Rangers perform "California".
870	January 30, 2020	Samantha Bee, Michael Stipe	N/A
American Witness Warrior. Don and Giant Impeach. A cameo appearance by Dana Carvey as John Bolton. The Hot 8 Brass Band sits in with the band and provides musical accompaniment. Ask-O-Matic technology allows Stephen to visit Des Moines, Iowa (special appearance by Elizabeth Warren). Samantha Bee discusses recent politics and Full Frontal. Michael Stipe discusses his new book, Our Interference Times, and his return to music.
871	January 31, 2020	Edie Falco, Fortune Feimster	Algiers
Late Show Presents: Nursery Rhymes: The Border Wall is Falling Down. Fury Road To The White House 2020. The Hot 8 Brass Band sits in with the band and provides musical accompaniment. Mat Talk for Regular People (special appearance by the cast of Cheer). Edie Falco discusses Tommy. Fortune Feimster discusses her new stand-up special, Sweet and Salty. Algiers performs "Dispossession" from their album There Is No Year.

=== February ===
No.	Original release date	Guest(s)	Musical/entertainment guest(s)
872	February 3, 2020	James Taylor, Rob McElhenney	N/A
Stephen Colbert's Post-Pre-Super Bowl interview of Sean Hannity's interview of President Trump. Super-Peach Hog-Cauc! (Monday) Don and the Giant Impeach. Late Show Exclusive: Triumph the Insult Comic Dog visits Capitol Hill. James Taylor discusses his new book, Break Shot: My First 21 Years. Rob McElhenney discusses It's Always Sunny in Philadelphia and Mythic Quest: Raven's Banquet.
873	February 4, 2020	John Leguizamo, Philip Rucker & Carol D. Leonnig	N/A
Special live episode following the State of the Union Address. Papr. Don and Giant Imspeech. IO-What the Hell?! John Leguizamo discusses recent politics and Latin History for Morons. Philip Rucker & Carol D. Leonnig discuss the State of the Union Address and their new book, A Very Stable Genius. Late Show Presents: Audience Questions.
874	February 5, 2020	Jim Carrey	N/A
Don and the Giant Impeach. Late Show Presents: Meanwhile. Meanwhile Presents: Cuisine-While. Jim Carrey discusses recent politics and Sonic the Hedgehog. Jim Carrey reimagines his greatest comedic moments with dramatic new performances.
875	February 6, 2020	Pete Buttigieg, Patton Oswalt	N/A
Mitt Romney: Secret Asset Man. Pete Buttigieg discusses recent politics and his 2020 presidential campaign. Patton Oswalt discusses his new stand-up tour, I Love Everything. Late Show Presents: Rehearsal Rewind.
876	February 7, 2020	James Taylor, Joe Mantegna	Michael Kiwanuka
Fury Road To The White House 2020. Late Show Presents: Meanwhile. James Taylor discusses the beginnings of his career and his new album, American Standard (new footage from February 3 episode). Joe Mantegna discusses Criminal Minds. Michael Kiwanuka performs "Light" from his album Kiwanuka.
877	February 10, 2020	John Oliver	Alex Ebert
Fury Road To The White House 2020. The Trump Ire Strikes Back. John Oliver discusses recent topics and Last Week Tonight. Alex Ebert performs "Stronger" from his album I vs I.
878	February 11, 2020	Julia Louis-Dreyfus	Moses Sumney
Fury Road To The White House 2020. Late Show Presents: Meanwhile. Julia Louis-Dreyfus discusses Downhill and Veep. Moses Sumney performs "Cut Me" from his album græ. Late Show Presents: Rehearsal Rewind.
879	February 12, 2020	Will Ferrell	N/A
Fury Road To The White House 2020. Chair Chat. Will Ferrell discusses Downhill. Late Show Presents: Audience Questions.
880	February 13, 2020	John Oliver, James Marsden, Sam Heughan	N/A
Jon Batiste Sings Classic Valentine's Day Black History Month Love Songs. Fury Road To The White House 2020. First Drafts: Valentine's Day Cards. The Late Show Presents: Maybe Coming Soon, with John Oliver (new footage from February 10 episode). James Marsden discusses Westworld and Sonic the Hedgehog. Sam Heughan discusses Outlander.
881	February 24, 2020	Rahm Emanuel	Hailee Steinfeld
Fury Road To The White House 2020. A cameo appearance by the Carolina Hurricanes' emergency goaltender David Ayres. Rahm Emanuel discusses recent politics and his new book, The Nation City. Hailee Steinfeld performs "Wrong Direction". Late Show Presents: Rehearsal Rewind.
882	February 25, 2020	Chris Christie	Nathaniel Rateliff
Special live episode following the tenth official Democratic debate. Fury Road To The White House 2020. Chris Christie discusses the tenth official Democratic debate and recent politics. Nathaniel Rateliff performs "Time Stands" from his album And It's Still Alright.
883	February 26, 2020	Jason Segel, Charlotte Alter	N/A
The Villain's Veil. Fury Road To The White House 2020. Hometown Hospitality (special appearance by Senator Elizabeth Warren). Jason Segel discusses Dispatches from Elsewhere. Charlotte Alter discusses her new book, The Ones We've Been Waiting For.
884	February 27, 2020	John Turturro, Charlamagne tha God	KALEO
Late Show Presents: Meanwhile. John Turturro discusses The Jesus Rolls. Charlamagne tha God discusses recent politics. KALEO performs "I Want More".
885	February 28, 2020	Tyra Banks, Coyote Peterson	N/A
The Bachelor: Seniors Looking for Love. Real News Tonight investigates: the South Carolina Democratic Primary. Tyra Banks discusses America's Next Top Model. Coyote Peterson discusses Brave the Wild and brings wild animals to Stephen's desk. Late Show Presents: Audience Questions.

=== March ===
No.	Original release date	Guest(s)	Musical/entertainment guest(s)
886	March 2, 2020	Ty Burrell, John Heilemann	James Taylor
Fury Road to the White House 2020. Stephen Colbert: International Nose Licker. Ty Burrell discusses Modern Family and Duncanville. John Heilemann discusses The Recount and recent politics. James Taylor performs "Almost Like Being in Love" from his album American Standard.
887	March 3, 2020	Anthony Mackie, Susan Glasser	N/A
Rick James' Super Tuesday Freak. Fury Road to the White House 2020: "Super Tuesday Senior Citizen Slam Down: It All Depends On Tonight to Ensure Victory! 2020". Late Show Presents: Meanwhile. Anthony Mackie discusses The Banker and The Falcon and the Winter Soldier. Great Achievements in Black Future (special appearance by David Alan Grier). Susan Glasser discusses her column for The New Yorker, "Letters From Trump's Washington", and recent politics.
888	March 4, 2020	Chris Hayes, David Chang	N/A
The Late Show Center for Disease Control Presents: Safe Greetings. Fury Road to the White House 2020. Goin' Viral. Chris Hayes discusses recent politics. David Chang discusses Ugly Delicious. Late Show Presents: Rehearsal Rewind.
889	March 5, 2020	Keith Urban, Casey Wilson	Keith Urban
Spencer Hunch, M.D. Fury Road to the White House 2020. Goin' Viral. Late Show Presents: Meanwhile. Keith Urban discusses the beginnings of his career. Casey Wilson discusses Black Monday and Bitch Sesh. Keith Urban performs "God Whispered Your Name".
890	March 6, 2020	Neil deGrasse Tyson, Ty Burrell	Hannah Einbinder
The Bug Boat. Goin' Viral. Neil deGrasse Tyson discusses recent scientific discoveries. Community Calendar: Grants Pass, Oregon with Ty Burrell (new footage from March 2 episode). Hannah Einbinder gives a stand-up performance.
891	March 9, 2020	John Krasinski	Rachael & Vilray
Goin' Viral. Princess Cruises: Home Edition. John Krasinski discusses A Quiet Place Part II. Rachael & Vilray perform "At Your Mother's House", with Jon Batiste & Stay Human providing musical accompaniment.
892	March 10, 2020	Charles Barkley, Peter Sarsgaard	N/A
Boston Hand Sanitizer. Goin' Viral. Fury Road to the White House 2020: "The Showdown to Find a Place to Sit Down! The Gloves Are Off, The Dentures Are In! Two Old Men Enter, One Leaves!" Charles Barkley discusses the upcoming March Madness tournament. Peter Sarsgaard discusses The Batman and Interrogation.
893	March 11, 2020	Hank Azaria, Suzy Nakamura	N/A
Corona Express. Goin' Viral. Fury Road to the White House 2020: "The Democratic Geriatric Pee Pop Primary Race to Reacher-Grab the Nomination!" Late Show Presents: Meanwhile. Meanwhile Presents: Quarantine-While. Hank Azaria discusses Brockmire. Suzy Nakamura discusses her days in The Second City with Stephen and Avenue 5.
894	March 12, 2020	Dr. Sanjay Gupta	N/A
Taped rehearsal with no audience due to the coronavirus pandemic. Chair Chat. Dr. Sanjay Gupta discusses his new podcast, Coronavirus: Fact vs. Fiction, and how to contain the disease. This episode was later rebroadcast on June 11, 2021 with a new brief intro by Stephen, ahead of the return of audiences to the Ed Sullivan Theater three days later.
895	March 30, 2020	John Oliver	N/A
John Oliver discusses recent politics. A Colbert Col-Vid: Mat Talk for Regular People (special appearance by the cast of Cheer; segment rebroadcast from January 31 episode).
896	March 31, 2020	Daniel Radcliffe, Jonathan Karl	N/A
Late Show Presents: Meanwhile. Meanwhile Presents: Quarantine-While. Daniel Radcliffe discusses Miracle Workers. Jonathan Karl discusses recent politics and his new book, Front Row at the Trump Show. A Colbert Col–Vid: Stephen and John Prine perform "That's the Way That the World Goes 'Round", from Prine's 1978 album Bruised Orange (new footage from September 28, 2016 episode).

=== April ===
No.	Original release date	Guest(s)	Musical/entertainment guest(s)
897	April 1, 2020	Ryan Reynolds	Keith Urban
Ryan Reynolds discusses his brand of gin, Aviation American Gin and the beginnings of his career. A Colbert Col–Vid: Keith Urban performs "God Whispered Your Name" (segment rebroadcast from March 5 episode).
898	April 2, 2020	Representative Nancy Pelosi, Alicia Keys	Alicia Keys
Bob Dylan Sings Lengthy Songs About U.S. Presidents To Help Pass The Time During The Quarantine. Representative Nancy Pelosi discusses recent politics. Alicia Keys guides Stephen through a meditation exercise and discusses her new book, More Myself. Alicia Keys performs a special rendition of Flo Rida's "My House". Jon Batiste acknowledges the death of Ellis Marsalis Jr.
899	April 6, 2020	Lady Gaga, Chance the Rapper	Jim James
Lady Gaga announces Together at Home. Chance the Rapper acknowledges the death of Bill Withers and discusses Punk'd. Jim James performs Withers' "Lean on Me".
900	April 7, 2020	Conan O'Brien	Michael Stipe
Conan O'Brien is a guest on Stephen's show – and vice versa. Michael Stipe performs "No Time for Love Like Now".
901	April 8, 2020	Senator Bernie Sanders	Brandi Carlile
Senator Bernie Sanders discusses the suspension of his 2020 presidential campaign. Stephen acknowledges the death of John Prine. Brandi Carlile performs Prine's "Hello in There".
902	April 9, 2020	Jon Favreau, Jon Lovett & Tommy Vietor; Jon Meacham	Dave Matthews
Survivor: Your House. The Tiger King Joe Exotic checks in from prison in Texas (special appearance by Thomas Lennon). Jon Favreau, Jon Lovett & Tommy Vietor discuss Pod Save America and recent politics. Jon Meacham discusses recent politics and his new book, The Hope of Glory. Dave Matthews performs John Prine's "Speed of the Sound of Loneliness".
903	April 13, 2020	Matthew McConaughey	Sam Hunt
Matthew McConaughey teaches Stephen how to make a mask against the coronavirus and his motto, "Just Keep Livin'". Sam Hunt performs "Hard to Forget" from his album Southside.
904	April 14, 2020	Dr. Jonathan LaPook, Cate Blanchett	N/A
New ESPN programming. Dr. Jonathan LaPook discusses the current coronavirus pandemic and answers questions from social media. Cate Blanchett discusses Mrs. America.
905	April 15, 2020	Shaquille O'Neal, Jessica Meir	Matt Berninger featuring Steph Altman
The Donald J. Trump Commemorative Coronavirus Check. Shaquille O'Neal remembers the first time he played against Michael Jordan and discusses Shaq Life. Jessica Meir speaks to Stephen from the International Space Station. Matt Berninger and Steph Altman perform "Holes".
906	April 16, 2020	Steve Martin, Phoebe Waller-Bridge	N/A
Late Show Presents: Quarantine-While. "Stop Steve Martin from Singing 'We Are the World'!" Phoebe Waller-Bridge discusses Fleabag.
907	April 20, 2020	Trevor Noah	Willie, Lukas & Micah Nelson
Stephen and Jon Batiste recap Together at Home. Trevor Noah discusses recent politics and his comedy tour, Loud & Clear. An Isolation Status Report (special appearance by Django Gold). Willie, Lukas & Micah Nelson perform "Hello Walls".
908	April 21, 2020	Michael Moore	Brett Eldredge
Late Show Presents: Quarantine-While. Michael Moore discusses recent politics and Planet of the Humans. Brett Eldredge performs "Gabrielle" from his album Sunday Drive.
909	April 22, 2020	Nathan Lane, José Andrés	N/A
Nathan Lane discusses Penny Dreadful: City of Angels. Stephen and Chef José Andrés step into the kitchen together.
910	April 23, 2020	Bill Gates, Claire Danes & Mandy Patinkin	N/A
Bill Gates discusses the coronavirus pandemic. Claire Danes & Mandy Patinkin discuss Homeland.
911	April 27, 2020	John Mulaney	John Fogerty
A Dr. Clean PSA. John Mulaney discusses The Oh, Hello Show's new podcast. Jon Batiste Scores Your Chores. John Fogerty and his family perform Creedence Clearwater Revival's "Have You Ever Seen the Rain?"
912	April 28, 2020	Jake Gyllenhaal	M. Ward
Surfin' MIA. Late Show Presents: Quarantine-While. Jake Gyllenhaal discusses Take Me to the World: A Sondheim 90th Celebration and Sea Wall/A Life. M. Ward performs "Migration of Souls" from his album Migration Stories.
913	April 29, 2020	Senator Amy Klobuchar & Mayor Pete Buttigieg	HAIM
Paper Sports. The Late Show's Archive of Basic Human Interaction. Amy Klobuchar & Pete Buttigieg discuss recent politics. HAIM performs "I Know Alone" from their album Women in Music Pt. III.
914	April 30, 2020	Senator Chuck Schumer, Paul Giamatti	N/A
Late Show Presents: Quarantine-While. Quarantine-While Presents: Mooooon Newwwws. Chuck Schumer discusses recent politics. Paul Giamatti discusses Billions.

=== May ===
No.	Original release date	Guest(s)	Musical/entertainment guest(s)
915	May 1, 2020	John Mulaney, Thandie Newton, Ina Garten	N/A
Animation-version of Colbert does the news satire desk sequence. Community Calendar: Internet Edition, with John Mulaney (new footage from April 27 episode). Thandie Newton discusses Westworld. Ina Garten makes a cocktail with Stephen and discusses her new book, Modern Comfort Food.
916	May 4, 2020	Anderson Cooper	Mark Foster
Jerry Seinfeld is Murder Hornet. Smile File. Anderson Cooper discusses the birth of his first child and recent politics. Mark Foster performs "It's OK to Be Human".
917	May 5, 2020	Stephen King	Sheryl Crow
The Late Show Presents: If Beachgoers Were As Lax About Sharks As They Are About The Coronavirus. Chopper Talk. Late Show Presents: Quarantine-While. Quarantine-While Presents: Meatwhile. A DIY Home Haircut. Stephen King discusses recent politics and his new book, If It Bleeds. Sheryl Crow performs George Harrison's "Beware of Darkness", from Harrison's 1970 album All Things Must Pass.
918	May 6, 2020	Robert De Niro	Randy Newman
First Drafts: Mother's Day Cards, with Stephen's wife, Evie. Robert De Niro discusses recent politics and this year's cancelled Tribeca Film Festival. Randy Newman performs "Stay Away".
919	May 7, 2020	Governor Andrew Cuomo	Christine and the Queens
The Last Dance: a 142-part docuseries (special appearances by Richard Kind, Pete Alonso and Neil deGrasse Tyson). Governor Andrew Cuomo discusses recent politics and the coronavirus pandemic. Christine and the Queens performs "People, I've Been Sad" from her EP La Vita Nuova.
920	May 11, 2020	Jake Tapper	Tame Impala
Stephen and Jon Batiste acknowledge the murder of Ahmaud Arbery. Jake Tapper discusses recent politics and The Outpost. Tame Impala performs "Is It True" from their album The Slow Rush.
921	May 12, 2020	Christine Baranski, Ellie Kemper	N/A
Late Show Presents: Quarantine-While. Christine Baranski discusses Take Me to the World: A Sondheim 90th Celebration and The Good Fight. Great Moments in Indoor History (special appearance by Paul F. Tompkins). Ellie Kemper discusses Unbreakable Kimmy Schmidt.
922	May 13, 2020	Hugh Laurie	Benjamin Gibbard
Stephen and his family celebrate his birthday. Stephen Takes Your Kids (special appearance by Neil deGrasse Tyson). Hugh Laurie discusses Avenue 5. Benjamin Gibbard performs "Life in Quarantine".
923	May 14, 2020	John Lithgow, Alison Roman	N/A
Chopper Talk. Late Show Presents: Quarantine-While. John Lithgow discusses his new book, Trumpty Dumpty Wanted a Crown. Alison Roman steps into the kitchen with Stephen and discusses her new book, Nothing Fancy.
924	May 18, 2020	Kumail Nanjiani	Andra Day
Late Show Presents: Quarantine-While. Quarantine-While Presents: Figurine-While. A special appearance by Elmo. Kumail Nanjiani discusses The Lovebirds and Eternals. Andra Day performs a Bill Withers medley ("Ain't No Sunshine" and "Use Me").
925	May 19, 2020	Gayle King, Amy Sedaris	N/A
The Wiggles Sing: Hybrid Cow. Real News Tonight. Gayle King discusses recent politics and her weekly radio show, Gayle King In the House. Stephen Colbert's Midnight Confessions. Amy Sedaris discusses At Home.
926	May 20, 2020	Steve Carell	Wilco
Late Show Presents: Dr. Jekyll and Mr. Trump (Supporting Doctor). Smile File. The unseen star of The Last Dance (special appearance by Nick Kroll). Steve Carell discusses Space Force. Stephen and Steve Carell acknowledge the death of Fred Willard. Wilco performs "Tell Your Friends".
927	May 21, 2020	Vice President Joe Biden	N/A
Play 'N Learn Preschool 2020: Virtual Graduation (special appearance by John Malkovich). Chopper Talk. I'll Take It. Joe Biden discusses recent politics, his 2020 presidential campaign and the coronavirus pandemic.

=== June ===
No.	Original release date	Guest(s)	Musical/entertainment guest(s)
928	June 1, 2020	Killer Mike, Chris Hayes	N/A
Time Life Books: The Present. Stephen and Jon Batiste acknowledge the murder of George Floyd. Killer Mike discusses recent politics and RTJ4. Chris Hayes discusses recent politics.
929	June 2, 2020	Keegan-Michael Key, Wes Moore	N/A
King Don's Bible. Keegan-Michael Key discusses recent politics and Game On! Wes Moore discusses recent politics and his new book, Five Days. Stephen acknowledges Blackout Tuesday.
930	June 3, 2020	Charlamagne tha God	Tunde Adebimpe
Late Show Presents: Quarantine-While. Charlamagne tha God discusses recent politics. Tunde Adebimpe performs "Love Dog" from TV on the Radio's 2008 album Dear Science.
931	June 4, 2020	Senator Cory Booker	Brian Wilson
Frank's Banquet Hall. A Rare Correkshun. Senator Cory Booker discusses recent politics. Brian Wilson performs "God Only Knows" from The Beach Boys' 1966 album Pet Sounds.
932	June 5, 2020	Representative Karen Bass, Andrew Ross Sorkin	Grace Potter featuring Jackson Browne, Marcus King & Lucius
Smoldery the Bear. Representative Karen Bass discusses recent politics. Andrew Ross Sorkin discusses Squawk Box and recent politics. Grace Potter performs "Each other", featuring Jackson Browne, Marcus King & Lucius.
933	June 9, 2020	Emmanuel Acho, Chris Wallace	N/A
Antifa: Fake Teeth, Fake Hips, Real Danger. Emmanuel Acho discusses Uncomfortable Conversations with a Black Man. Chris Wallace discusses recent politics and his new book, Countdown 1945.
934	June 10, 2020	Stacey Abrams, Megan Rapinoe	The Flaming Lips
Votefall! Stacey Abrams discusses recent politics and her new book, Our Time is Now. Megan Rapinoe discusses her platform for activism and #ShareTheMicNow. The Flaming Lips perform "Race for the Prize" from their 1999 album The Soft Bulletin.
935	June 11, 2020	Wesley Lowery, Judd Apatow	N/A
Late Show Presents: Quarantine-While. Wesley Lowery discusses recent politics and 60 in 6. Judd Apatow discusses The King of Staten Island.
936	June 15, 2020	John Dickerson	Black Pumas
John Dickerson discusses recent politics and his new book, The Hardest Job in the World. Black Pumas perform Tracy Chapman's "Fast Car".
937	June 16, 2020	Hasan Minhaj	Jason Isbell & The 400 Unit
The newest book from Mary L. Trump. Late Show Presents: Quarantine-While. Hasan Minhaj discusses Patriot Act. Jason Isbell & The 400 Unit perform "Running with Our Eyes Closed" from their album Reunions.
938	June 17, 2020	Senator Kamala Harris	Milky Chance and Jack Johnson
A message from the United Pancake Manufacturers Consortium. Senator Kamala Harris discusses recent politics and the Black Lives Matter movement. Milky Chance and Jack Johnson perform "Don't Let Me Down".
939	June 18, 2020	Sherrilyn Ifill, Mike Birbiglia	N/A
A message from Mrs. Butterworth's. Jon Batiste announces United We Sing: A Grammy Tribute to the Unsung Heroes. First Drafts: Father's Day Cards. Sherrilyn Ifill discusses recent politics. Mike Birbiglia discusses his new book, The New One: Painfully True Stories from a Reluctant Dad.
940	June 22, 2020	James Corden	Bright Eyes
Late & Show Present: Oklahoma! A cameo appearance by Laura Benanti as Melania Trump. James Corden discusses recent politics and the current coronavirus pandemic. Bright Eyes performs "Mariana Trench" from their album Down in the Weeds, Where the World Once Was.
941	June 23, 2020	Ambassador John Bolton	N/A
The History Channel. Chopper Talk. Ambassador John Bolton discusses recent politics and his new book, The Room Where It Happened.
942	June 24, 2020	Jon Stewart	N/A
The Room Where It Happened: An Audiobook (special appearance by Michael Bolton). Previously On... Michael Flynn. Jon Stewart discusses the Black Lives Matter movement, recent politics and Irresistible.
943	June 25, 2020	Ibram X. Kendi, Patton Oswalt	N/A
Logical Conclusion. Late Show Presents: Quarantine-While. Ibram X. Kendi discusses his books, How to Be an Antiracist and Antiracist Baby. Patton Oswalt discusses I'll Be Gone in the Dark.

=== July ===
No.	Original release date	Guest(s)	Musical/entertainment guest(s)
944	July 13, 2020	Norah O'Donnell	IDK
The Tragic School Bus. Previously On... Roger Stone. Norah O'Donnell discusses recent politics and the COVID-19 pandemic. IDK performs "No Cable" from his album Is He Real.
945	July 14, 2020	Tom Hanks	Noah Cyrus & Billy Ray Cyrus
Tom Hanks discusses Greyhound and his COVID-19 diagnosis. Noah Cyrus & Billy Ray Cyrus perform "July".
946	July 15, 2020	Ricky Gervais	Noah Cyrus & Billy Ray Cyrus
Late Show Presents: Quarantine-While. Ricky Gervais discusses After Life. Noah Cyrus & Billy Ray Cyrus perform "Young & Sad".
947	July 16, 2020	W. Kamau Bell, The Chicks	The Chicks
Creekdale. Car-A-Fire. W. Kamau Bell discusses United Shades of America and recent politics. The Chicks discusses their band name change and their new album, Gaslighter. The Chicks perform "March March".
948	July 20, 2020	Andy Cohen	Phoebe Bridgers
Stephen and Jon Batiste acknowledge the death of John Lewis. Andy Cohen discusses The Andy Cohen Diaries. Phoebe Bridgers performs "Kyoto" from her album Punisher.
949	July 21, 2020	Keegan-Michael Key, Greta Thunberg	N/A
Fascist Frank's Italian Beef Emporium. Sex and the Occupied City. Late Show Presents: Quarantine-While. The Late Show Presents: Maybe Coming Soon, with Keegan-Michael Key (new footage from June 2 episode). Greta Thunberg discusses her environmental activism platform and the current COVID-19 pandemic.
950	July 22, 2020	Mary Trump	N/A
Mary Trump discusses recent politics and her new book, Too Much and Never Enough.
951	July 23, 2020	Ava DuVernay, Kristen Bell	Ben Folds
A Good Brain. Late Show Presents: Quarantine-While. Ava DuVernay remembers John Lewis and discusses recent politics. Kristen Bell discusses her new book, The World Needs More Purple People. Ben Folds performs "2020".

=== August ===
No.	Original release date	Guest(s)	Musical/entertainment guest(s)
952	August 10, 2020	Dr. Jon LaPook	Maroon 5
Dr. Jon LaPook discusses the current COVID-19 pandemic. Maroon 5 performs "Nobody's Love".
953	August 11, 2020	Laura Linney	N/A
The Late Show Presents: "The 2020 Party Primaries: The Local Access Street To The On-Ramp To The Road To The White House: Connecticut: The Nutmeg State: Grate Some Democracy On Your Electoral Nog! 2020". "The Vlottery Veeperbowl Veep-Tucky Derb-Veep Hot Dog Veeping Contest For Veep President!". Late Show Presents: Quarantine-While. Late Show's Uninformed Correspondent: Coronavirus Edition. Laura Linney discusses Ozark.
954	August 12, 2020	April Ryan, Jason Sudeikis	N/A
Hallmark Cards: The Vice Presidential Condolence Card Collection. The Late Show Presents: "The 2020 Party Primaries: The Local Access Street To The On-Ramp To The Road To The White House: Connecticut: The Nutmeg State: Grate Some Democracy On Your Electoral Nog! 2020". April Ryan discusses recent politics. Jason Sudeikis discusses Ted Lasso.
955	August 13, 2020	Mark McKinnon & Alex Wagner	Baby Rose
Ted Bidet's Shower Head Emporium. Late Show Presents: Quarantine-While. Mark McKinnon & Alex Wagner discuss recent politics. Baby Rose performs "Show You" from her album To Myself.
956	August 17, 2020	Ambassador Susan Rice	Sheryl Crow
Special live episode following the first night of the 2020 Democratic National Convention. America: Endgame. Virtual Milwaukee. Ambassador Susan Rice discusses recent politics. Sheryl Crow performs "Woman in the White House".
957	August 18, 2020	Senator Elizabeth Warren	Regina Spektor
Special live episode following the second night of the 2020 Democratic National Convention. The re-release of The Postman. America: Endgame. Late Show Presents: Quarantine-While. Senator Elizabeth Warren discusses recent politics. Regina Spektor performs "Prisoners", from her 2001 album Songs, featuring dancer Caleb Teicher.
958	August 19, 2020	Senator Bernie Sanders	Nathaniel Rateliff & Jon Batiste
Special live episode following the third night of the 2020 Democratic National Convention. America: Endgame. Senator Bernie Sanders discusses recent politics. Nathaniel Rateliff & Jon Batiste perform a special rendition of Sam & Dave's "Hold On, I'm Comin'".
959	August 20, 2020	Secretary of State Hillary Clinton	The Killers
Special live episode following the fourth and final night of the 2020 Democratic National Convention. America: Endgame. Secretary of State Hillary Clinton discusses recent politics. The Killers perform "Blowback" from their album Imploding the Mirage.
960	August 24, 2020	Jon Favreau, Jon Lovett & Tommy Vietor	Tim McGraw
Special live episode following the first night of the 2020 Republican National Convention. America: Endgame. Stephen and Jon Batiste acknowledge the shooting of Jacob Blake in Kenosha, Wisconsin. A cameo appearance by Laura Benanti as Melania Trump. Jon Favreau, Jon Lovett & Tommy Vietor discuss recent politics. Tim McGraw performs "Hard to Stay Mad At" from his album Here on Earth.
961	August 25, 2020	Keanu Reeves & Alex Winter, Representative Trey Gowdy	N/A
Special live episode following the second night of the 2020 Republican National Convention. America: Endgame. Keanu Reeves & Alex Winter discuss Bill & Ted Face the Music. Representative Trey Gowdy discusses recent politics and his new book, Doesn't Hurt to Ask. Stephen issues an apology to the city of Milwaukee.
962	August 26, 2020	Speaker Nancy Pelosi	Lucinda Williams
Special live episode following the third night of the 2020 Republican National Convention. America: Endgame. Stephen and Jon Batiste acknowledge the impact of Hurricane Laura in Louisiana. Speaker Nancy Pelosi discusses recent politics. Lucinda Williams performs "You Can't Rule Me" from her album Good Souls Better Angels.
963	August 27, 2020	Governor Chris Christie	Gregory Porter
Special live episode following the fourth and final night of the 2020 Republican National Convention. America: Endgame. Look Back At Anger. Governor Chris Christie discusses recent politics. Smile File. Gregory Porter performs "Revival" from his album All Rise.

=== September ===
No.	Original release date	Guest(s)	Musical/entertainment guest(s)
964	September 14, 2020	Bob Woodward	Luke Combs
Jetway Jibber Jabber. Bob Woodward discusses recent politics and his new book, Rage. Luke Combs performs "Six Feet Apart" from his album What You See Is What You Get.
965	September 15, 2020	Janelle Monáe, Jacob Soboroff	N/A
The Walking Dumb. Late Show Presents: Quarantine-While. Janelle Monáe discusses Antebellum. Stephen and Janelle Monáe acknowledge the death of Chadwick Boseman. Jacob Soboroff discusses recent politics and his new book, Separated: Inside an American Tragedy.
966	September 16, 2020	Drew Barrymore	Lang Lang
Late Show Exclusive: Triumph the Insult Comic Dog holds a Trump focus group. Drew Barrymore discusses The Drew Barrymore Show. Lang Lang performs Variations 23 and 30 from Johann Sebastian Bach's Goldberg Variations.
967	September 17, 2020	Sarah Paulson	PJ Morton
Late Show Presents: Quarantine-While. Late Show Exclusive: Triumph the Insult Comic Dog holds a Trump focus group. Sarah Paulson discusses Ratched. PJ Morton performs "All In His Plan" from his album Gospel According to PJ: From the Songbook of PJ Morton.
968	September 21, 2020	Lt. General H. R. McMaster, Laurence Fishburne	N/A
Stephen acknowledges the death of Ruth Bader Ginsburg. Lt. General H. R. McMaster discusses recent politics and his new book, Battlegrounds. Laurence Fishburne discusses the new Audible audiobook, The Autobiography of Malcolm X.
969	September 22, 2020	Desus & Mero	Jake Isaac
Late Show Presents: Quarantine-While. Desus & Mero discuss their new book, God-Level Knowledge Darts. Jake Isaac performs "New York" from his EP Things I'll Tell You Tomorrow.
970	September 23, 2020	Jeff Daniels	Cat Stevens
Chopper Talk. Jeff Daniels discusses The Comey Rule and recent politics. Cat Stevens performs "Wild World" from his 1970 album Tea for the Tillerman.
971	September 24, 2020	Representative Katie Porter, Tony Romo	N/A
Late Show Presents: Quarantine-While. Representative Katie Porter discusses recent politics. Tony Romo discusses his work as an analyst for CBS Sports.
972	September 28, 2020	Mariah Carey	Rex Orange County
Shady Cuts. Mariah Carey discusses her new book, The Meaning of Mariah Carey, and her new album, The Rarities. Rex Orange County performs "Always" from his album Pony.
973	September 29, 2020	Senator Cory Booker	Public Enemy featuring B-Real of Cypress Hill and George Clinton
Special live episode following the first presidential debate. De Clash for Democracy in Decline. Senator Cory Booker discusses the first presidential debate and recent politics. Late Show Presents: Quarantine-While. Public Enemy performs "Grid" from their album What You Gonna Do When the Grid Goes Down?, featuring B-Real and George Clinton.
974	September 30, 2020	John Lithgow, Jonathan Alter	N/A
Chopper Talk. John Lithgow discusses his new book, Trumpty Dumpty Wanted a Crown. Jonathan Alter discusses recent politics and his new book, His Very Best: Jimmy Carter, A Life. A Late Show Presents: Wild Discoveries of the Secret Habitats of Unseen Worlds, hosted by head writer Jay Katsir.

=== October ===
No.	Original release date	Guest(s)	Musical/entertainment guest(s)
975	October 1, 2020	Ethan Hawke, Andrew Weissmann	N/A
Late Show Presents: Quarantine-While. Quarantine-While Presents: Cuisine-While. Ethan Hawke discusses The Good Lord Bird. Andrew Weissmann discusses recent politics and his new book, Where Law Ends: Inside the Mueller Investigation.
976	October 2, 2020	Dr. Jonathan LaPook, John Dickerson	N/A
Previously unannounced episode; aired following President Trump's positive COVID-19 diagnosis. Dr. Jonathan LaPook and John Dickerson discuss President Trump's positive COVID-19 diagnosis and recent politics.
977	October 5, 2020	Jon Bon Jovi	Bon Jovi
Achoober. Jon Bon Jovi discusses the COVID-19 pandemic and Bon Jovi's new album, 2020. Bon Jovi performs "Do What You Can".
978	October 6, 2020	Jerry Seinfeld	Ella Mai
Crab of Reason. Jerry Seinfeld discusses his new book, Is This Anything? Ella Mai performs "Not Another Love Song".
979	October 7, 2020	Mayor Pete Buttigieg	Future Islands
Special live episode following the vice presidential debate. Stephen Colbert's Zoom Interview with President Trump. Salt Lake Vice: The Race For Second Place: Kamala Versus Psalm-Ala: A Heartbeat Away From Important 2020. Pete Buttigieg discusses the vice presidential debate and his new book, Trust: America's Best Chance. Late Show Presents: Quarantine-While. Future Islands performs "For Sure" from their album As Long as You Are.
980	October 8, 2020	Mindy Kaling, CIA Director John Brennan	N/A
Late Show Presents: Quarantine-While. Quarantine-While Presents: Cuisine-While. Mindy Kaling announces the birth of her son and discusses her new book, Nothing Like I Imagined (Except For Sometimes). CIA Director John Brennan discusses recent politics and his new book, Undaunted.
981	October 9, 2020	The cast of The West Wing	N/A
The cast of The West Wing and Aaron Sorkin discuss A West Wing Special to Benefit When We All Vote.
982	October 19, 2020	Joy Reid, Yahya Abdul-Mateen II	N/A
Dancing with the Don. Joy Reid discusses The ReidOut and recent politics. Yahya Abdul-Mateen II discusses The Trial of the Chicago 7.
983	October 20, 2020	Dolly Parton	Ty Dolla $ign featuring Jhené Aiko and Mustard
Late Show Presents: Quarantine-While. Dolly Parton discusses her new book, Dolly Parton: Songteller. Ty Dolla $ign performs "By Yourself", featuring Jhené Aiko and Mustard.
984	October 21, 2020	Bruce Springsteen, Eva Longoria	N/A
An exclusive preview of the White House's cut of this week's 60 Minutes episode. Bruce Springsteen discusses his new album, Letter to You, and his documentary of the same name. Eva Longoria discusses her work for the Latino Victory Project and Essential Heroes: A Momento Latino Event.
985	October 22, 2020	Governor Andrew Cuomo	Matt Berninger
Special live episode following the now second presidential debate. The 2020 Presidential Debates: Old Man Slap Fight 2: Slap Harder! The Pursuit to Mute The Brute! Governor Andrew Cuomo discusses the second presidential debate and his new book, American Crisis. Late Show Presents: Quarantine-While. Matt Berninger performs "One More Second" from his album Serpentine Prison.
Special	October 23, 2020	2020 Campaign Coverage Special	N/A
Special clip show hosted by Sam Waterston, with The Late Show's best 2020 campaign coverage moments.
986	October 26, 2020	Sacha Baron Cohen, Jeff Tweedy	N/A
Catch A Third Wave: Endless Bummer. Sacha Baron Cohen discusses Borat Subsequent Moviefilm and The Trial of the Chicago 7. Jeff Tweedy discusses his new album, Love Is the King, and his new book, How to Write One Song.
987	October 27, 2020	Dr. Sanjay Gupta, Sarah Cooper	N/A
Catch A Third Wave: Endless Bummer. Late Show Presents: Quarantine-While. Dr. Sanjay Gupta discusses the current COVID-19 pandemic. Sarah Cooper discusses Everything's Fine.
988	October 28, 2020	Jaime Harrison, Elvis Costello	Elvis Costello
Breaking News. A word with Republican election strategist Cobra Commander. Jamie Harrison discusses his candidacy for the South Carolina U.S. Senate seat. Elvis Costello discusses his new album, Hey Clockface. Elvis Costello performs "Hey Clockface" from his album of the same name, with Jon Batiste providing musical accompaniment.
989	October 29, 2020	Julie Andrews	Sam Smith
The Bone Zone. Catch A Third Wave: Endless Bummer. Polling expert Amy Winter looks forward to the 2020 election by discussing election polling data. Julie Andrews discusses her new book, Homework. Sam Smith performs "Diamonds" from his album Love Goes.
990	October 30, 2020	Jon Stewart, Neil deGrasse Tyson	N/A
Catch A Third Wave: Endless Bummer. Stephen Colbert's Intimate Secrets, with Jon Stewart, featuring a special appearance by Tony Bennett. Neil deGrasse Tyson discusses the COVID-19 pandemic and Cosmos: Possible Worlds. Late Show's Creepy COVID Stay-at-home Halloween Tips.

=== November ===
No.	Original release date	Guest(s)	Musical/entertainment guest(s)
991	November 2, 2020	John Oliver, Cher	JoJo
Late Show Presents: Calm! John Oliver discusses recent politics and Last Week Tonight. Cher discusses recent politics and her new single, "Happiness Is Just A Thing Called Joe". JoJo performs "The Change", the official Biden-Harris campaign anthem.
992	November 4, 2020	Shepard Smith	Leon Bridges featuring Lucky Daye
LSSC Street. Shepard Smith discusses the election results and recent politics. A Late Show Films Presents: A Cecil B. Colbert Production: The Electoral College And You. Leon Bridges & Lucky Daye perform "All About You".
993	November 5, 2020	Larry Wilmore	Laura Benanti
Late Show Presents: Quarantine-While. Stephen Takes Your Kids: Election Edition. Larry Wilmore discusses recent politics and his new late-night talk show, Wilmore. Laura Benanti performs "Don't Worry 'Bout Me" from her self-titled debut album, featuring Pasquale Grasso on guitar.
Special	November 6, 2020	Alex Wagner, John Heilemann & Mark McKinnon; Charlamagne tha God, Jena Friedman & Maz Jobrani	Arcade Fire
Rebroadcast of Stephen Colbert's Election Night 2020: Democracy's Last Stand: Building Back America Great Again Better 2020, on Showtime. Election Knight Rises. The Most Election Night Panel Ever (special appearances by John Dickerson, Michael Bennet, Andrew Yang, Neil deGrasse Tyson, Julius Erving, Madeleine Albright, Bryan Cranston, Gilbert Gottfried, Method Man, RuPaul, Ethan Hawke, George Takei and Doris Kearns Goodwin). Charlamagne tha God's List of Things We Had To Lose. Charlamagne tha God's List of Things We Still Have To Lose. Alex Wagner, John Heilemann & Mark McKinnon discuss the election results. Charlamagne tha God, Jena Friedman & Maz Jobrani discuss the election results. Arcade Fire performs "Generation A". Things That Feel As Satisfying As You Want This To.
994	November 9, 2020	Stacey Abrams, Thomas Middleditch	N/A
The Road From The White House, featuring Stephen's take on the Four Seasons Total Landscaping press conference. Stephen and Jon Batiste acknowledge the death of Alex Trebek. Stacey Abrams discusses recent politics and her new book, Our Time Is Now. Thomas Middleditch discusses B Positive.
995	November 10, 2020	Hugh Grant, Sturgill Simpson	Sturgill Simpson
Cornsworth & Pinchley: Attorneys-At-Law. Bamlanivimab. Late Show Presents: Quarantine-While. Hugh Grant discusses The Undoing. Sturgill Simpson discusses his new album, Cuttin' Grass – Vol. 1. Sturgill Simpson performs "Breakers Roar".
996	November 11, 2020	Olivia Colman & Gillian Anderson	Kylie Minogue
The Road From The White House. Here's Where It Gets Weird / Here's Where The Weird Gets Strange / Here's Where The Strange Weirdness Gets Odd / Here's Where The Odd Strange Weirdness Gets Fishy / Here's Where The Fishy Strange Weird Oddness Gets Bizarre. Stephen presents new items from his own lifestyle brand, Covetton House. Olivia Colman & Gillian Anderson discuss The Crown. Kylie Minogue performs "Magic" from her album Disco.
997	November 12, 2020	Michael Moore, Steve Carell	Sara Bareilles
POTUSgeist. Stephen acknowledges the 1,000th episode of the show. The Road From The White House. Michael Moore discusses recent politics. Maybe Coming Soon, with Steve Carell (new footage from May 20 episode). Sara Bareilles performs "More Love" from her album More Love: Songs from Little Voice Season One.
998	November 16, 2020	Jake Tapper	Benee
Catch A Third Wave: Endless Bummer. The Road From The White House. A message to Donald Trump voters from Hillary Clinton voters. Jake Tapper discusses recent politics. Benee performs "Happen to Me" from her album Hey U X.
999	November 17, 2020	Lewis Hamilton	Andrea Bocelli
The Road From The White House. Late Show Presents: Quarantine-While. Quarantine-While Presents: Naughty Pope News. A look at Doug Emhoff's fashion, featuring writer Michael Cruz Kayne. Lewis Hamilton discusses his 7th Formula One Drivers' title. Andrea Bocelli performs "I Believe" from his album Believe.
1000	November 18, 2020	Matthew McConaughey, Cedric the Entertainer	N/A
F-U-Haul. The Road From The White House. Matthew McConaughey discusses his new book, Greenlights. Cedric the Entertainer discusses The Neighborhood.
1001	November 19, 2020	LL Cool J, Dave Grohl	Foo Fighters
Hallmark Cards: The Dr. Atlas Holiday Card Collection. The Road From The White House. Catch A Third Wave: Endless Bummer. Now That's What I Call Yam Jams. Late Show Presents: Quarantine-While. Quarantine-While Presents: Meanwhowl. LL Cool J discusses NCIS: Los Angeles, the 35th anniversary of his debut album Radio and the 30th anniversary of Mama Said Knock You Out. Dave Grohl discusses the 25th anniversary of Foo Fighters and the band's forthcoming album, Medicine at Midnight. Foo Fighters perform "Shame Shame".
1002	November 23, 2020	Glenn Close	Kane Brown featuring Swae Lee and Khalid
Catch A Third Wave: Endless Bummer. Late Show Presents: Quarantine-While. Glenn Close discusses Hillbilly Elegy. Kane Brown performs "Be Like That" from his album Mixtape, Vol. 1, featuring Swae Lee and Khalid.
1003	November 24, 2020	President Barack Obama	Brittany Howard
The Road From The White House. President Barack Obama discusses recent politics and his new book, A Promised Land. Brittany Howard performs a special rendition of The Beatles' "Revolution".
1004	November 25, 2020	Rob Corddry, José Andrés	N/A
The Mono-Logue. The Road From The White House. A surprise visit by Rudy Giuliani (special appearance by John Lithgow). Rob Corddry discusses The Unicorn. Up on the roof of the Ed Sullivan Theater, Chef José Andrés steps into an impromptu kitchen with Stephen.
1005	November 30, 2020	President Barack Obama, Vol. 2	N/A
A Late Show's Chock-A-Block-A-Barack Obama-Rama Extravagama. President Barack Obama discusses recent politics and his new book, A Promised Land. Questions We're Pretty Sure Barack Obama Has Never Been Asked Before (new footage from November 24 episode).

=== December ===
No.	Original release date	Guest(s)	Musical/entertainment guest(s)
1006	December 1, 2020	Bryan Cranston, Cori Bush	N/A
The Road From The White House. Late Show Presents: Quarantine-While. Bryan Cranston discusses Your Honor. Bryan Cranston's Yule of Law. Cori Bush discusses recent politics. A Late Show Presents: Zoom Out!
1007	December 2, 2020	Kate Winslet, Michael Eric Dyson	N/A
The Road From The White House. Catch A Third Wave: Endless Bummer. Kate Winslet discusses Ammonite. Michael Eric Dyson discusses recent politics and his new book, Long Time Coming. A Late Show Presents: Zoom Out!
1008	December 3, 2020	Christopher C. Krebs, Aubrey Plaza	N/A
Catch A Third Wave: Endless Bummer. The Road From The White House. Late Show Presents: Quarantine-While. Quarantine-While Presents: Mon-while. Christopher C. Krebs discusses recent politics. Aubrey Plaza discusses Happiest Season and Black Bear. A Late Show Presents: Zoom Out!
1009	December 4, 2020	Common	Andrea Bocelli
Joe Biden's Broken Foot Break Down. Catch A Third Wave: Endless Bummer. The Mono-Log. Stephen Takes Your Kids (special appearance by Will Ferrell). Common discusses his new album, A Beautiful Revolution (Pt. 1), and his new podcast, Mind Power Mixtape. Andrea Bocelli performs "Silent Night". A Late Show Presents: Zoom Out!
1010	December 7, 2020	Meryl Streep	Chris Stapleton
Catch A Third Wave: Endless Bummer. The Road From The White House. Meryl Streep discusses Let Them All Talk and The Prom. Chris Stapleton performs "Devil Always Made Me Think Twice" from his album Starting Over.
1011	December 8, 2020	John Dickerson, Emily Bazelon & David Plotz	Greta Van Fleet
Catch A Third Wave: Endless Bummer. The Road From The White House. Late Show Presents: Quarantine-While. John Dickerson, Emily Bazelon & David Plotz discuss the 15th anniversary of their podcast, Slate Political Gabfest, and recent politics. Greta Van Fleet performs "My Way, Soon" from their forthcoming album The Battle at Garden's Gate.
1012	December 9, 2020	Rachel Maddow, Megan Thee Stallion	N/A
Catch A Third Wave: Endless Bummer. The Road From The White House. Jon Batiste announces his involvement in the film Soul. Rachel Maddow discusses recent politics. Megan Thee Stallion discusses her new album, Good News.
1013	December 10, 2020	James Corden	Fleet Foxes
Catch A Third Wave: Endless Bummer. The Road From The White House. First Drafts: Holiday Cards, with Stephen's wife, Evie. James Corden discusses The Prom and Cats. Fleet Foxes perform "Can I Believe You" from their album Shore, with the Resistance Revival Chorus providing musical accompaniment.
Special	December 11, 2020	Stephen Colbert's Return To New Zealand: A Magical Land Where Hugs Still Happen	N/A
A special behind-the-scenes look at Stephen's trip to New Zealand (new footage from November 18–22, 2019 episodes), featuring a new interview with Peter Jackson.
1014	December 14, 2020	Christopher Walken, Chance the Rapper	N/A
The Road From The White House. Catch A Third Wave: Endless Bummer. More Show! A cameo appearance by Laura Benanti as Melania Trump. Christopher Walken discusses Wild Mountain Thyme. Chance the Rapper discusses the upcoming 10th anniversary of the recording of his debut mixtape, 10 Day, and his new album with Jeremih, Merry Christmas Lil Mama: The Gift That Keeps On Giving.
1015	December 15, 2020	Anderson Cooper & Andy Cohen, Whoopi Goldberg	N/A
Late Show Presents: Quarantine-While. Quarantine-While Presents: Peen-While. Anderson Cooper & Andy Cohen discuss their upcoming coverage of CNN's live New Year's Eve show. Whoopi Goldberg discusses The Stand. A Late Show Presents: Zoom Out!
1016	December 16, 2020	Tom Hanks	Leslie Odom Jr.
Hot Goss! Tom Hanks discusses News of the World. Leslie Odom Jr. performs "O Holy Night" from his album The Christmas Album.
1017	December 17, 2020	President-Elect Joe Biden & Dr. Jill Biden	Jon Batiste
Better Know A Delaware: Raising Your Del-awareness. President-Elect Joe Biden & Dr. Jill Biden discuss recent politics in a special interview in Wilmington, Delaware. Jon Batiste performs "Have Yourself A Merry Little Christmas".
1018	December 18, 2020	George Clooney	N/A
2020: The Year That Took Years – What A Clusterfond Look Back. Don and the Giant Impeach. Late Show Presents: Twas The Coup Before Christmas. George Clooney discusses The Midnight Sky.
