= Sabotage (Bebe Rexha song) =

2021 single by Bebe Rexha

Single by Bebe Rexha

from the album Better Mistakes
- Released: April 16, 2021
- Genre: Pop; rock; power ballad
- Length: 2:57
- Label: Warner
- Composers: Greg Kurstin; Jon Hume; Michael Matosic; Michael Tighe
- Lyricist: Bebe Rexha
- Producer: Greg Kurstin

Bebe Rexha singles chronology
"Sacrifice" (2021)	"Sabotage" (2021)	"I'm Not Pretty (Remix)" (2021)

Music video
- "Sabotage" on YouTube

"Sabotage" is a song by American singer-songwriter Bebe Rexha, from her second studio album Better Mistakes. It was released on April 16, 2021, as the third single from the album.

== Release ==
On April 14, 2021, Rexha announced on her social media platforms that the song was going to be released as the third single off her upcoming album, Better Mistakes along its pre-order. The song was released on April 16 accompanied by its music video. A Simlish version was recorded for The Sims 4, and was featured in a limited-time "Sims Sessions" in-game music event in 2021.

== Composition ==
"Sabotage" was written by Rexha along Jon Hume, Michael Matosic and Greg Kurstin, the last also producing the song. It has been described as a pop ballad which displays a "straight-from-the-heart" lyricism and talks about how she sabotages her best moments. Rexha herself stated that the track is the "most vulnerable" on Better Mistakes.

"Sabotage" is one of the most vulnerable songs on my new album, Better Mistakes. It’s just as beautiful as it is painfully honest. I admit to getting in my own way when things are going well. I know I am not alone in experiencing self-sabotage during life’s most precious moments, and this ballad is an acknowledgment that sometimes we are our own worst enemy.

— Rexha talking about the inspiration and meaning behind the song

== Music video ==
The music video for the track was premiered the song's release date. It was directed by Christian Breslauer. The clip features Rexha in an abandoned house with meadow at her feet, slowing sinking in water and where all mirrors shatter around her. She ends up setting the whole house on fire with a match.

== Charts ==
Weekly chart performance for "Sabotage"
Chart (2021–2022)	Peak position
Finland Airplay (Radiosoittolista)	9
New Zealand Hot Singles (RMNZ)	19
