= Bret Baier =

American journalist (born 1970)

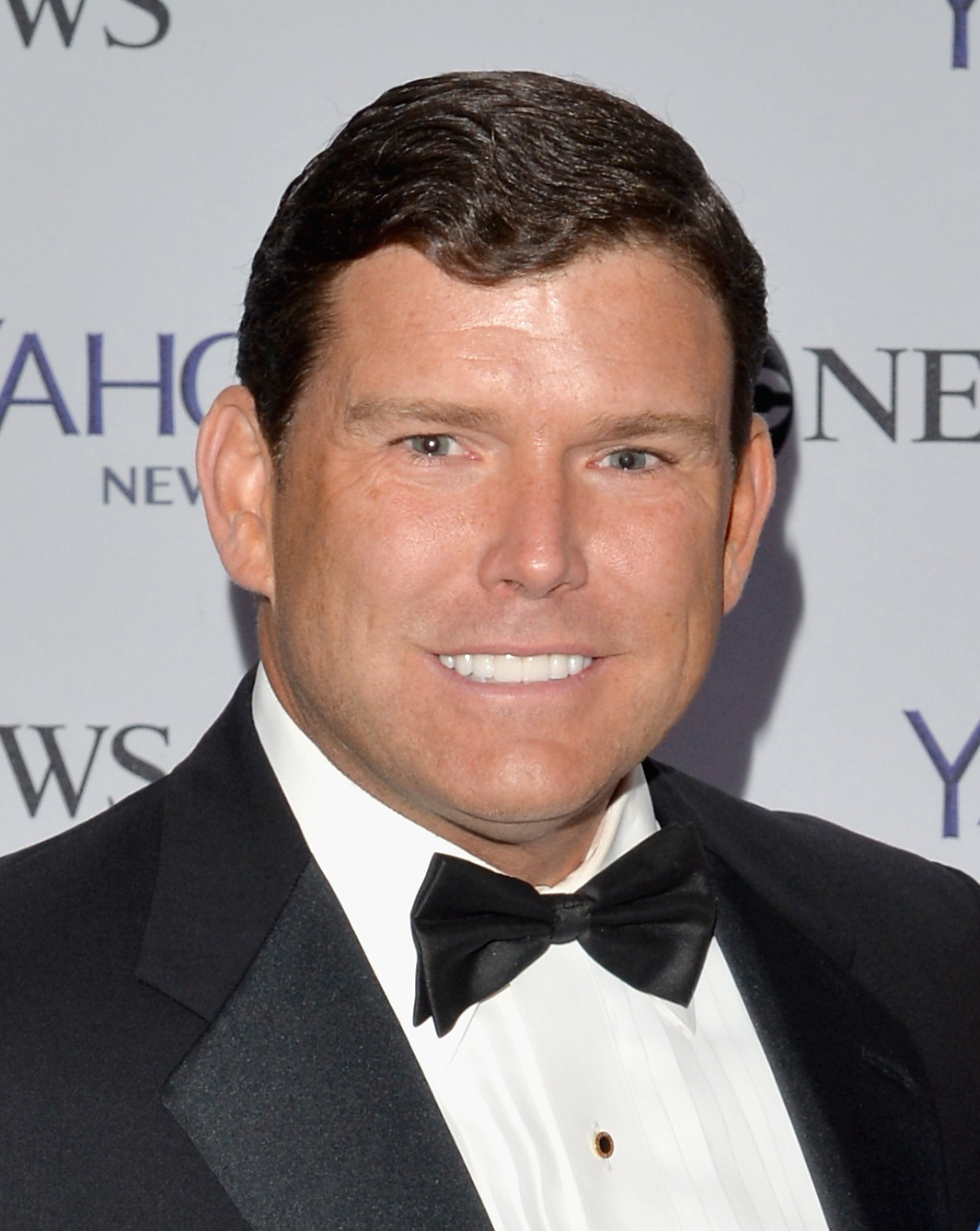
- Baier in 2014
- Born: William Bret Baier; August 4, 1970 (age 56); Rumson, New Jersey, U.S.
- Education: DePauw University (BA)
- Occupation: Anchor
- Spouse: Amy Hills (m. 2004)
- Children: 2

William Bret Baier (/ˈbeɪər/ BAY-ər; born August 4, 1970) is an American host of Special Report with Bret Baier on Fox News and the chief political anchor for Fox. He previously worked as the network's Chief White House Correspondent and Pentagon correspondent.

== Early life ==
Baier was born in Rumson, New Jersey, to a family of mixed German and Irish origins. Raised Catholic, he attended Marist School, a private Roman Catholic high school in Atlanta, Georgia, graduating in 1988. Baier then attended DePauw University in Greencastle, Indiana, graduating in 1992 with a BA degree in political science and English. At DePauw, he became a member of the Xi chapter of Sigma Chi fraternity.

== Career ==
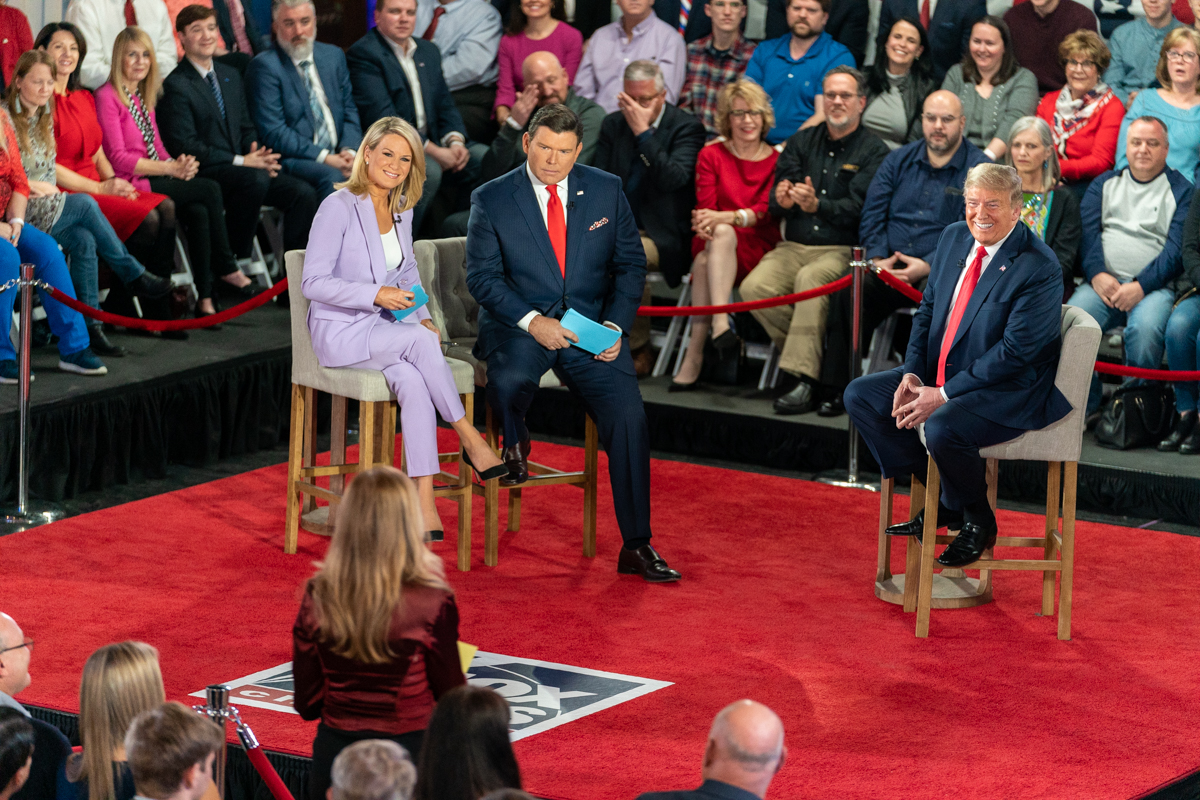
Baier and Martha MacCallum moderate a town hall with President Donald Trump in 2020

Baier began his television career with a local station WJWJ TV16 on Hilton Head Island, South Carolina, before joining WRAL-TV, then CBS affiliate in Raleigh, North Carolina. He sent an audition tape to Fox News in 1998, and was hired as the network's Atlanta bureau chief.

On September 11, 2001, he drove from Georgia to Arlington, Virginia, to cover the attack on the Pentagon. He never returned to the Atlanta bureau and was instead tapped as the network's Pentagon correspondent, remaining at the post for five years and taking 11 trips to Afghanistan and 13 trips to Iraq.

He was named Fox News's White House correspondent in 2007, covering the presidential administration of George W. Bush. In the fall of 2007, he began substituting for Brit Hume, then the anchor of Special Report, on Fridays.

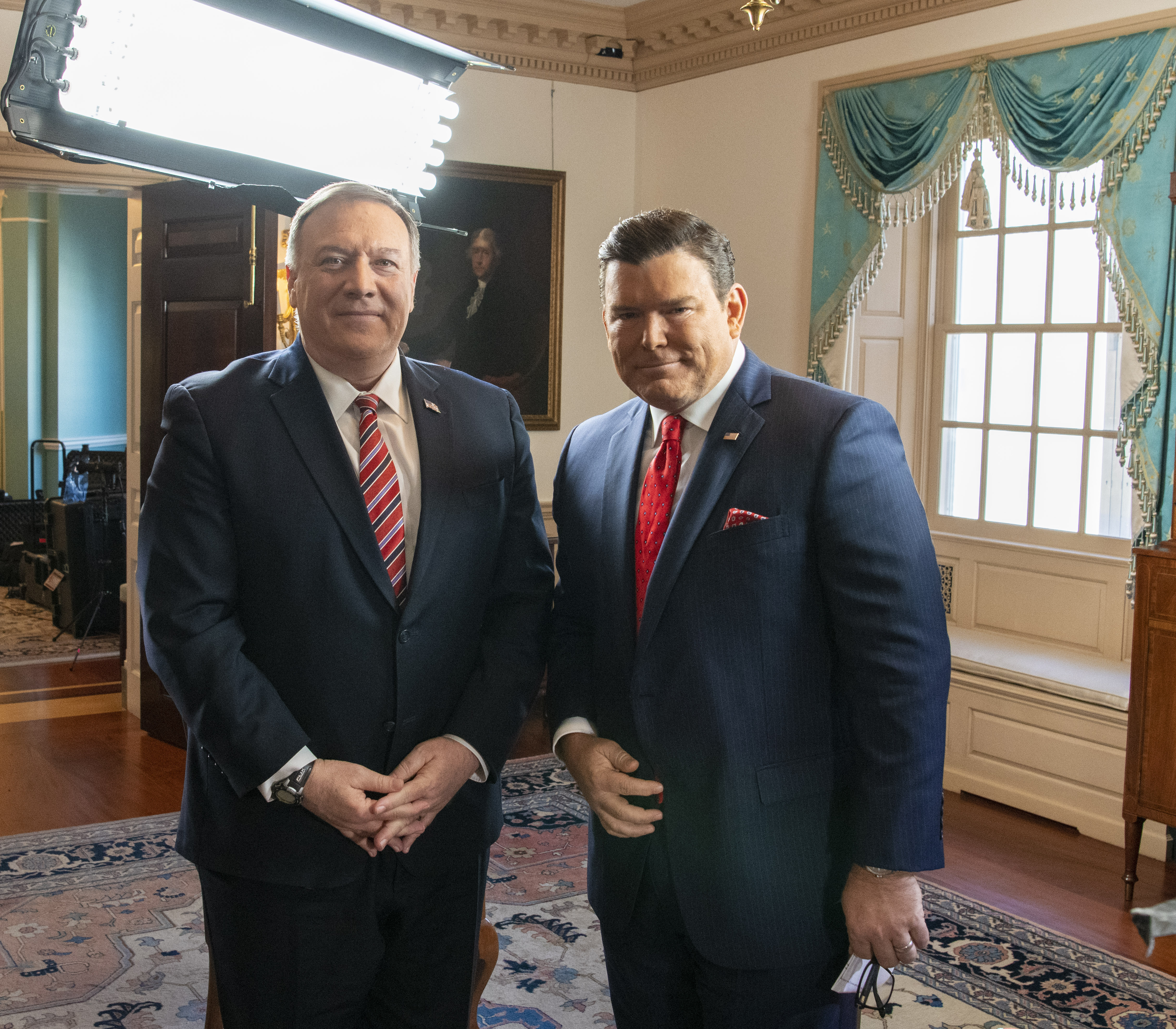
Baier (right) with Secretary of State Mike Pompeo in 2020

On December 23, 2008, Hume anchored his final show and announced Baier would replace him as anchor of Special Report. He hosted his first show as permanent anchor on January 5, 2009.

In an email shortly after the 2020 United States presidential election, Baier argued that Fox should pull its projection that Joe Biden had won the state of Arizona. Baier worried that the projection might upset Fox viewers enough for them to abandon the network.

In October 2021, Baier promoted his new book To Rescue the Republic: Ulysses S. Grant, the Fragile Union, and the Crisis of 1876 on The Late Show with Stephen Colbert.

In June 2023, Baier interviewed former U.S. president Donald Trump. In that interview, Baier pressed Trump on his refusal to return classified documents, asked him why he insulted people he himself had hired, and disputed his repeated claims that the 2020 election was stolen, at one point saying to him, "You lost the 2020 election." Baier was roundly praised for his performance in the interview.

In August 2023, Baier co-moderated the first GOP Primary debate alongside Martha MacCallum. The debate was viewed by around 12.8 million people.

In September 2023, Baier interviewed Saudi crown prince Mohammed bin Salman in Sindalah, Saudi Arabia.

In October 2023, Baier planned to host a discussion between the candidates vying to replace Former House Speaker Kevin McCarthy. After his ouster, Representatives Kevin Hern, Jim Jordan and Steve Scalise planned to join Baier to make their public case for House Leadership on Special Report. However, the plans fell through after other House Republicans became angry at the idea, calling it a "horrible idea" and a "distraction".

In February 2024, Baier traveled to Ukraine to interview President Volodymyr Zelenskyy about the ongoing Russo-Ukrainian war. It was the first interview Zelenskyy has done on the front lines of the war. In the interview, Zelenskyy called Tucker Carlson's interview with Vladimir Putin "two hours of bullshit," and made the case for more western aid to Ukraine.

On October 16, 2024, Baier met with Democratic presidential candidate Kamala Harris on Fox News for her first interview on this network. The interview was described as "contentious" and "fiery", with Baier frequently interrupting Harris and the two talking over each other. Baier's "combative interview delivered an average of 7.8 million viewers...according to Nielsen data" and got "9.2 million viewers including 1.12 million in the key A24-54 demo, according to finalized data."

Baier interviewed Zelenskyy again in February 2025 after his contentious Oval Office meeting with President Trump and Vice President Vance. The interview drew over 6 million viewers.

Baier released a new history book, To Rescue the American Spirit: Teddy Roosevelt and the Birth of a Superpower, on October 21, 2025.

On October 24, 2025, it was reported that Bari Weiss, Editor-in-Chief of CBS News, was considering Baier to become the new anchor of CBS Evening News (as a possible replacement of hosts John Dickerson and Maurice DuBois) due to a decline in ratings. Baier, who is under contract with FOX through 2028, declined the offer and declared that he is "very happy at FOX." Tony Dokoupil was ultimately selected.

== Reception ==
Baier has received numerous awards for his work. In 2016, Baier earned the Kenneth Y. Tomlinson Award for Outstanding Journalism from the Robert Novak Journalism Fellowship Program. In 2017, he received the Sol Taishoff Award for Excellence in Broadcast Journalism from the National Press Foundation and the Urbino Press Award from the Municipality of Urbino.

== Personal life ==
Baier, who served as an altar boy in his youth, is a practicing Roman Catholic and attends Holy Trinity Catholic Church in Georgetown.

Baier and his wife Amy have two sons, Daniel and Paul. Paul was born with cardiac problems and before the child's open-heart surgery in 2008, President George W. Bush invited Baier and his wife and son to the Oval Office for a visit and had the White House physician update him on Paul's progress. In 2009, Baier was named a "Significant Sig" by the Sigma Chi Fraternity.

In 2024, Paul underwent a fifth open-heart surgery after doctors discovered a life-threatening aneurysm. The operation, performed at Children's National Hospital in Washington, D.C., was successful, and by 2025 Baier reported that Paul was recovering well, making college plans, and resuming normal activities such as playing golf on his high school team.

Baier has played golf with President Trump and is a regular guest at his Mar-a-Lago resort.

== Works ==
- Special Heart: A Journey of Faith, Hope, Courage and Love (2014) ISBN 9781455583638
- Three Days in January: Dwight Eisenhower's Final Mission (2017) ISBN 9780062569035
- Three Days in Moscow: Ronald Reagan and the Fall of the Soviet Empire (2018) ISBN 9780062748362
- Three Days at the Brink: FDR's Daring Gamble to Win World War II (2019) ISBN 9780062905680
- To Rescue the Republic: Ulysses S. Grant, the Fragile Union, and the Crisis of 1876 (2021) ISBN 9780063039544
- To Rescue the Constitution: George Washington and the Fragile American Experiment (2023) ISBN 9780063039582
