= Better Mistakes =

Studio album by Bebe Rexha
- Released: May 7, 2021
- Recorded: 2019
- Genre: Pop
- Length: 36:00
- Label: Warner
- Producers: Andrew Bolooki; Blake Slatkin; Brian Lee; Burns; Jussifer; Jason Gill; Greg Kurstin; Michael Keenan; Lostboy; Mike Elizondo; Nick Mira; Sam Wish; The Futuristics; The Six; Travis Barker

Bebe Rexha chronology
Expectations (2018)	Better Mistakes (2021)	Bebe (2023)

Singles from Better Mistakes
- 1. "Baby, I'm Jealous" Released: October 9, 2020; 2. "Sacrifice" Released: March 5, 2021; 3. "Sabotage" Released: April 16, 2021; 4. "Break My Heart Myself" Released: July 29, 2022

Better Mistakes is the second studio album by American singer-songwriter Bebe Rexha, released on May 7, 2021, by Warner Records. It serves as the follow-up to her debut studio album, Expectations (2018) and contains guest features from Travis Barker, Ty Dolla Sign, Trevor Daniel, Lil Uzi Vert, Doja Cat, Pink Sweats, Lunay and Rick Ross. The album was preceded by the singles "Baby, I'm Jealous", "Sacrifice", and "Sabotage".

== Background ==
Bebe worked on the album and finished it before the COVID-19 pandemic, with most of the recording taking place in the summer and fall of 2019. Rexha announced the album's title as Better Mistakes, along with its artwork and release date (May 7, 2021), on April 14, 2021, along with the announcement of the third single, "Sabotage". On April 15, she revealed the tracklist on her social media accounts. The album was available for pre-order on April 16, coinciding with the release of "Sabotage".

== Composition ==
Rexha described the album as a pop record with "a lot of hip-hop in it". She added that it's "not...dance music, but you can bop to it". The opening track, "Break My Heart Myself", which features Travis Barker, makes references to how Rexha lives with bipolar disorder.

== Singles ==
On October 5, 2020, Bebe Rexha announced the lead single called "Baby, I'm Jealous", featuring Doja Cat, would be released on October 9. The song charted at number 58 on the US Billboard Hot 100. She released the follow-up single, "Sacrifice", on March 4, 2021. On April 14, Rexha announced the third single, "Sabotage", would be released on April 16, along with the album's pre-order. On April 28, Rexha announced the song "Die for a Man" featuring American rapper-singer-songwriter Lil Uzi Vert would be released as the promotional single off the album on April 30. She later gave a snippet of the song a day before the single's release.

A remix of "Break My Heart Myself" featuring Yeji and Ryujin of the K-pop girl group Itzy was released as a single on July 29, 2022, following a viral dance performance of the original track by the duo in June.

== Critical reception ==
Professional ratings
Review scores
Source	Rating
AllMusic	3/5 stars
Clash	7/10
Entertainment Weekly	B
The Forty-Five	3.5/5 stars
Spectrum Culture	65%
The Young Folks	8/10

Robin Murray from Clash called the album a "bulldozer 30 minute pop experience" that "affords Bebe Rexha space to amplify her potency while exposing her insecurities", further summarizing it as "13 songs that punch out their truths and then dissipate".

== Commercial performance ==
Better Mistakes debuted at number 140 on the US Billboard 200 becoming Rexha's lowest charting album on the chart. In Canada, the album debuted at number 57 on the Billboard Canadian Albums.

== Track listing ==
Better Mistakes track listing
No.	Title	Writer(s)	Producer(s)	Length
1.	"Break My Heart Myself" (featuring Travis Barker)	Bleta Rexha; Justin Tranter; Jussi Karvinen; Travis Barker	Jussifer; Mike Elizondo; Barker	2:31
2.	"Sabotage"	Rexha; Michael Tighe; Jon Hume; Michael Matosic; Greg Kurstin	Kurstin	2:56
3.	"Trust Fall"	Rexha; Madison Love; Sorana Păcurar; Blake Slatkin	Slatkin; Nick Mira; Sam Wish	2:30
4.	"Better Mistakes"	Rexha; Tranter; Lisa Scinta; Peter Rycroft; Richard Boardman; Pablo Bowman	Lostboy; The Six	2:15
5.	"Sacrifice"	Rexha; Bowman; Rycroft; Matthew Burns	Burns	2:40
6.	"My Dear Love" (featuring Ty Dolla Sign and Trevor Daniel)	Rexha; Tyrone Griffin; Trevor Neill; Tranter; Brian Lee; Andrew Bolooki	Lee; Bolooki	2:52
7.	"Die for a Man" (featuring Lil Uzi Vert)	Rexha; Symere Woods; Michelle Buzz; Nick Mira; Jason Gill	Mira; Gill	2:47
8.	"Baby, I'm Jealous" (featuring Doja Cat)	Rexha; Amala Dlamini; Bowman; Tranter; Karvinen; Gill	Jussifer; Gill	2:55
9.	"On the Go" (featuring Pink Sweats and Lunay)	Rexha; David Bowden; Michael Keenan; Jefnier Osorio Moreno	Keenan	2:59
10.	"Death Row"	Rexha; Tranter; Boardman; Bowman	The Six	3:00
11.	"Empty"	Rexha; Tranter; Karvinen; Boardman; Bowman	Jussifer; The Six	2:28
12.	"Amore" (featuring Rick Ross)	Rexha; Michael Pollack; William Roberts; Nate Cyphert; Alex Schwartz; Joe Khajadourian; Harry Warren; Jack Brooks	The Futuristics	2:54
13.	"Mama"	Rexha; Tranter; Karvinen; Lee; Alexander Dexter-Jones; Freddie Mercury	Jussifer; Lee	3:08
Total length:				36:00

Notes

- "Amore" contains an interpolation of the 1953 song "That's Amore", written by Harry Warren and Jack Brooks.
- "Mama" contains an interpolation of the 1975 song "Bohemian Rhapsody", by the band Queen.

== Personnel ==
Musicians

- Bebe Rexha – lead vocals
- Travis Barker – drums (1)
- Peter Rycroft – bass, drums, guitar, synthesizer programming (4)
- David Strääf – drum programming (4), guitar (4, 11), backing vocals, drums, synthesizer (10, 11); acoustic guitar, electric guitar, percussion, programming, violin (10)
- Richard Boardman – drum programming, synthesizer (4, 11); keyboards (10)
- Burns – all instruments (5)
- Pablo Bowman – backing vocals (5), guitar (10)

Technical

- Colin Leonard – masterer
- Jaycen Joshua – mixer (1, 2, 6–9, 12, 13)
- Şerban Ghenea – mixer (3)
- Tom Norris – mixer (5)
- Mitch McCarthy – mixer (10)
- Greg Kurstin – recording engineer (2)
- Alex Pasco – recording engineer (2)
- Julian Burg – recording engineer (2)
- Burns – recording engineer (5)
- Devon Corey – vocal engineer (2)
- Jon Hume – vocal engineer (2)

== Charts ==
Chart performance for Better Mistakes
Chart (2021)	Peak position
Canadian Albums (Billboard)	57
UK Album Downloads (Official Charts)	22
US Billboard 200	140

== Release history ==
Release dates and formats for Better Mistakes
Region	Date	Format	Label	Ref.
Various	May 7, 2021	Digital download; streaming	Warner	
Various	July 2, 2021	CD	Warner	
Various	December 31, 2021	LP	Warner	
