= Bebe Rexha discography =

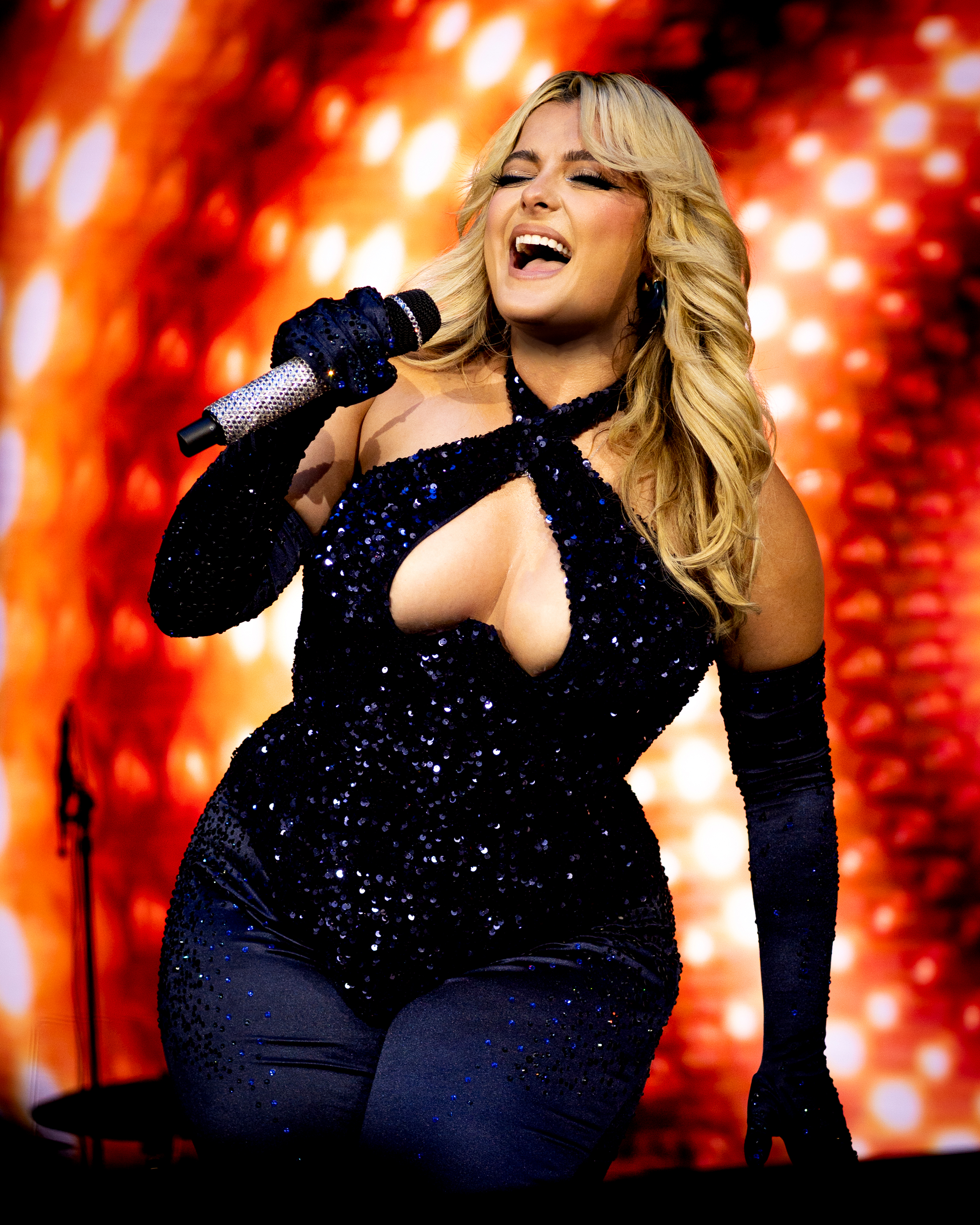
- Rexha in 2023
- Studio albums: 4
- EPs: 3
- Singles: 38
- Music videos: 22
- Promotional singles: 10

American singer and songwriter Bebe Rexha has released four studio albums, three extended plays, 38 singles (including thirteen as featured artist), ten promotional singles, and twenty-two music videos. Rexha released "I Can't Stop Drinking About You" as her debut single in 2014, followed by "I'm Gonna Show You Crazy", which was certified Platinum by the Swedish Recording Industry Association (GLF). Both releases were included on I Don't Wanna Grow Up (2015), the singer's first extended play. In 2015, Rexha collaborated with G-Eazy for her breakthrough single "Me, Myself & I", which experienced widespread success worldwide and was awarded multi-Platinum certifications in several countries.

Similar success was achieved with the subsequent singles, "In the Name of Love" (2016) with Martin Garrix and "I Got You" (2016). From February to August 2017, the singer released another two extended plays, All Your Fault: Pt. 1 and All Your Fault: Pt. 2. The latter spawned the single "Meant to Be" featuring country duo Florida Georgia Line and became the singer's highest-peaking single in several countries. The song is also included on her debut studio album, Expectations, which was released on June 22, 2018. She had also been featured on multiple other successful singles, including "Take Me Home" (2013) by Cash Cash, "Hey Mama" (2015) by David Guetta, "Back to You" (2017) by Louis Tomlinson, "Call You Mine" (2019) by the Chainsmokers, and "I'm Good (Blue)" (2022) with Guetta while having writing credits on various songs.

During 2020–2023 Rexha has released some notable singles as a solo musician as well as with guest vocalists from her friends within the industry. Most notable for her audience are "Baby, I'm Jealous" (2020) with featured vocals from Doja Cat, "Satellite" (2023) with Snoop Dogg, and "One in a Million" (2023) with David Guetta. In 2024, Rexha released "Chase It (Mmm Da Da Da)" and "I'm the Drama", before leaving Warner Records. On February 12, 2026, Rexha released the trailer for her first visual album, Dirty Blonde. This marks her first release as an independent artist after leaving Warner Records.

== Studio albums ==
Title	Details	Peak chart positions										Certifications
Title	Details	US	AUS	CAN	FRA	GER	IRE	NLD	NOR	SWI	UK	Certifications
Expectations	Release date: June 22, 2018; Label: Warner; Formats: CD, LP, digital download, streaming	13	19	14	153	55	40	58	37	31	33	RIAA: Platinum; BPI: Silver; IFPI NOR: Platinum; MC: 2× Platinum; NVPI: Gold; RMNZ: Platinum
Better Mistakes	Release date: May 7, 2021; Label: Warner; Formats: CD, LP, digital download, streaming	140	—	57	—	—	—	—	—	—	—	
Bebe	Release date: April 28, 2023; Label: Warner; Formats: CD, LP, digital download, streaming	132	—	36	94	—	—	—	—	—	—	MC: Gold
Dirty Blonde	Release date: June 12, 2026; Label: Empire; Formats: CD, LP, cassette, digital download, streaming	43	37	—	85	—	—	—	—	—	71	
"—" denotes a recording that did not chart or was not released in that territory.

== Extended plays ==
Title	Details	Peak chart positions						Certifications
Title	Details	US	CAN	FIN	NZ Heat.	SWE	SWI	Certifications
I Don't Wanna Grow Up	Release date: May 12, 2015; Label: Warner Bros.; Formats: CD, digital download, streaming	—	—	—	—	—	—	
All Your Fault: Pt. 1	Release date: February 17, 2017; Label: Warner Bros.; Format: CD, LP, digital download, streaming	51	31	27	5	54	55	
All Your Fault: Pt. 2	Release date: August 11, 2017; Label: Warner Bros.; Format: CD, LP, digital download, streaming	33	30	—	—	—	—	MC: Platinum; RMNZ: Gold
"—" denotes a recording that did not chart or was not released in that territory.

== Singles ==
=== As lead artist ===
Title	Year	Peak chart positions										Certifications	Album
Title	Year	US	AUS	CAN	GER	NLD	NZ	NOR	SWE	SWI	UK	Certifications	Album
"I Can't Stop Drinking About You"	2014	— (Note: "I Can't Stop Drinking About You" did not enter the Billboard Hot 100, but peaked at number 15 on the Bubbling Under Hot 100 chart.)	—	—	—	—	—	—	—	—	—		I Don't Wanna Grow Up
"I'm Gonna Show You Crazy"	2014	—	—	—	—	—	—	17	30	—	—	MC: Gold; GLF: Platinum; IFPI NOR: 4× Platinum; RMNZ: Gold	I Don't Wanna Grow Up
"Gone"	2014	—	87	—	—	—	—	—	—	—	—		Non-album single
"Me, Myself & I" (with G-Eazy)	2015	7	19	9	7	11	9	2	4	11	13	RIAA: 9× Platinum; ARIA: 2× Platinum; BPI: 2× Platinum; BVMI: 3× Gold; GLF: 3× Platinum; IFPI NOR: 3× Platinum; IFPI SWI: Platinum; MC: 6× Platinum; NVPI: Platinum; RMNZ: 4× Platinum	When It's Dark Out
"No Broken Hearts" (featuring Nicki Minaj)	2016	— (Note: "No Broken Hearts" did not enter the Billboard Hot 100, but peaked at number 9 on the Bubbling Under Hot 100 Singles chart.)	—	97	92	—	—	—	— (Note: "No Broken Hearts" did not enter the Sverigetopplistan chart, but peaked at number six on the Heatseeker chart.)	—	—	IFPI NOR: Gold	Non-album singles
"In the Name of Love" (with Martin Garrix)	2016	24	8	19	14	4	8	5	9	10	9	RIAA: 3× Platinum; ARIA: 4× Platinum; BPI: 2× Platinum; BVMI: 3× Gold; GLF: 4× Platinum; IFPI NOR: 3× Platinum; IFPI SWI: Platinum; MC: 3× Platinum; NVPI: Gold; RMNZ: 4× Platinum	Non-album singles
"I Got You" (Note: Also included on Expectations.)	2016	43	73	38	67	60	—	—	29	60	91	RIAA: Platinum; ARIA: Platinum; BPI: Silver; IFPI NOR: Gold; MC: 2× Platinum; NVPI: Gold; RMNZ: Gold	All Your Fault: Pt. 1
"F.F.F." (featuring G-Eazy)	2017	—	—	—	—	—	—	—	—	—	—		All Your Fault: Pt. 1
"The Way I Are (Dance with Somebody)" (featuring Lil Wayne)	2017	—	72	—	—	—	— (Note: "The Way I Are (Dance with Somebody)" did not enter the NZ Top 40 Singles Chart, but peaked at number seven on the NZ Heatseeker Singles Chart.)	—	—	—	—		All Your Fault: Pt. 2
"Meant to Be" (featuring Florida Georgia Line)	2017	2	2	7	57	18	5	5	8	34	11	RIAA: 11× Platinum; ARIA: 8× Platinum; BPI: 2× Platinum; BVMI: Gold; GLF: 2× Platinum; IFPI NOR: 3× Platinum; IFPI SWI: Gold; MC: Diamond; NVPI: Platinum; RMNZ: 7× Platinum	All Your Fault: Pt. 2
"Home" (with Machine Gun Kelly and X Ambassadors)	2017	90	74	43	27	93	30	12	99	39	64	RIAA: Platinum; BPI: Gold; IFPI NOR: 3× Platinum; RMNZ: 2× Platinum	Bright: The Album
"Push Back" (with Ne-Yo and Stefflon Don)	2018	—	—	—	—	—	—	—	—	—	—		Good Man
"I'm a Mess"	2018	35	41	25	86	—	— (Note: "I'm a Mess" did not enter the NZ Top 40 Singles Chart, but peaked at number 19 on the NZ Top 40 Hot Singles.)	18	— (Note: "I'm a Mess" did not enter the Swedish Singellista Chart, but peaked at number two on the Swedish Heatseeker Chart.)	93	77	RIAA: 2× Platinum; ARIA: Platinum; BPI: Gold; BVMI: Gold; IFPI NOR: 2× Platinum; MC: 4× Platinum; RMNZ: Platinum	Expectations
"Say My Name" (with David Guetta and J Balvin)	2018	— (Note: "Say My Name" did not enter the Billboard Hot 100, but peaked at number three on the Bubbling Under Hot 100 chart.)	70	59	30	10	— (Note: "Say My Name" did not enter the NZ Top 40 Singles Chart, but peaked at number 10 on the NZ Hot Singles Chart.)	37	30	14	91	RIAA: Platinum; BPI: Gold; BVMI: Gold; IFPI NOR: Gold; MC: Platinum; RMNZ: Gold	7
"Last Hurrah"	2019	98	65	73	84	63	— (Note: "Last Hurrah" did not enter the NZ Top 40 Singles Chart, but peaked at number 14 on the NZ Hot Singles Chart.)	10	57	77	50	RIAA: Gold; BPI: Silver; IFPI NOR: Platinum; RMNZ: Gold	Non-album single
"Harder" (with Jax Jones)	2019	—	—	—	—	—	— (Note: "Harder" did not enter the NZ Top 40 Singles Chart, but peaked at number 31 on the NZ Hot Singles Chart.)	—	64	—	23	ARIA: Gold; BPI: Gold; RMNZ: Gold	Snacks
"You Can't Stop the Girl"	2019	—	—	—	—	78	— (Note: "You Can't Stop the Girl" did not enter the NZ Top 40 Singles Chart, but peaked at number 31 on the NZ Hot Singles Chart.)	—	—	—	—		Maleficent: Mistress of Evil
"Baby, I'm Jealous" (featuring Doja Cat)	2020	58	—	60	—	—	— (Note: "Baby, I'm Jealous" did not enter the NZ Top 40 Singles Chart, but peaked at number four on the NZ Hot Singles Chart.)	—	—	—	86	RIAA: Gold	Better Mistakes
"Sacrifice"	2021	—	—	—	—	62	— (Note: "Sacrifice" did not enter the NZ Top 40 Singles Chart, but peaked at number 17 on the NZ Hot Singles Chart.)	—	—	—	—		Better Mistakes
"Sabotage"	2021	—	—	—	—	—	— (Note: "Sabotage" did not enter the NZ Top 40 Singles Chart, but peaked at number 19 on the NZ Hot Singles Chart.)	—	—	—	—		Better Mistakes
"Die for a Man" (featuring Lil Uzi Vert)	2021	—	—	—	—	—	— (Note: "Die for a Man" did not enter the NZ Top 40 Singles Chart, but peaked at number 39 on the NZ Hot Singles Chart.)	—	—	—	—		Better Mistakes
"Chain My Heart" (with Topic)	2021	—	—	—	100	—	—	—	— (Note: "Chain My Heart" did not enter the Swedish Singellista Chart, but peaked at number 18 on the Swedish Heatseeker Chart.)	—	—		Non-album singles
"It's You, Not Me (Sabotage)" (with Masked Wolf)	2021	—	—	—	—	—	— (Note: "It's You, Not Me (Sabotage)" did not enter the NZ Top 40 Singles Chart, but peaked at number 31 on the NZ Hot Singles Chart.)	—	—	—	—		Non-album singles
"I'm Good (Blue)" (with David Guetta)	2022	4	1	1	1	1	4	1	1	1	1	RIAA: 2× Platinum; ARIA: 4× Platinum; BPI: 3× Platinum; BVMI: 2× Platinum; IFPI SWI: 8× Platinum; MC: 9× Platinum; RMNZ: 4× Platinum	Bebe
"Heart Wants What It Wants"	2023	—	—	—	—	—	— (Note: "Heart Wants What It Wants" did not enter the NZ Top 40 Singles Chart, but peaked at number 21 on the NZ Hot Singles Chart.)	—	—	—	—		Bebe
"Call on Me"	2023	— (Note: "Call on Me" did not chart on the Billboard Hot 100, but did peak at number 13 on the related Dance/Electronic Songs chart.)	—	—	—	—	—	—	—	—	—		Bebe
"Satellite" (with Snoop Dogg)	2023	—	—	—	—	—	—	—	—	—	—		Bebe
"Stars" (with Pnau and Ozuna)	2023	—	—	—	—	—	— (Note: "Stars" did not enter the NZ Top 40 Singles Chart, but peaked at number 19 on the NZ Hot Singles Chart.)	—	—	—	—		Hyperbolic
"One in a Million" (with David Guetta)	2023	—	98	—	—	28	— (Note: "One in a Million" did not enter the NZ Top 40 Singles Chart, but peaked at number six on the NZ Hot Singles Chart.)	—	— (Note: "One in a Million" did not enter the Swedish Singellista Chart, but peaked at number seven on the Swedish Heatseeker Chart.)	—	79		Non-album singles
"Heart Still Beating" (with Nathan Dawe)	2023	— (Note: "Heart Still Beating" did not chart on the Billboard Hot 100, but did peak at number 44 on the related Dance/Electronic Songs chart.)	—	—	—	63	— (Note: "Heart Still Beating" did not enter the NZ Top 40 Singles Chart, but peaked at number 33 on the NZ Hot Singles Chart.)	—	—	—	74		Non-album singles
"It's On"	2023	—	—	—	—	—	—	—	—	—	—		Non-album singles
"Deep in Your Love" (with Alok)	2024	— (Note: "Deep In Your Love" did not chart on the Billboard Hot 100, but did peak at number 11 on the related Dance/Electronic Songs chart.)	—	—	—	57	— (Note: "Deep in Your Love" did not enter the NZ Top 40 Singles Chart, but peaked at number 26 on the NZ Hot Singles Chart.)	—	— (Note: "Deep in Your Love" did not enter the Swedish Singellista Chart, but peaked at number 14 on the Swedish Heatseeker Chart.)	—	—		Non-album singles
"Chase It (Mmm Da Da Da)"	2024	— (Note: "Chase It (Mmm Da Da Da)" did not chart on the Billboard Hot 100, but did peak at number 14 on the related Dance/Electronic Songs chart.)	—	—	—	—	—	—	—	—	—		Non-album singles
"I'm the Drama"	2024	—	—	—	—	—	—	—	—	—	—		Non-album singles
"My Oh My" (with Kylie Minogue and Tove Lo)	2024	—	—	—	—	—	— (Note: "My Oh My" did not enter the NZ Top 40 Singles Chart, but peaked at number 21 on the NZ Hot Singles Chart.)	—	—	—	63		Tension II
"Light That Leads Me" (with Netsky)	2025	—	—	—	—	—	—	—	—	—	—		TBA
"New Religion" (with Faithless)	2026	—	— (Note: "New Religion" did not enter the Australian Singles Chart but peaked at number 18 on the ARIA Top 20 Dance Singles Chart.)	—	8	30	— (Note: "New Religion" did not enter the NZ Top 40 Singles Chart, but peaked at number 10 on the NZ Hot Singles Chart.)	82	97	26	41	BPI: Silver; SNEP: Gold	Dirty Blonde
"Sad Girls" (with David Guetta)	2026	—	—	—	—	—	— (Note: "Sad Girls" did not enter the NZ Top 40 Singles Chart, but peaked at number 10 on the NZ Hot Singles Chart.)	—	—	—	—		Dirty Blonde
"One Day"	2026	—	—	—	—	—	— (Note: "One Day" did not enter the NZ Top 40 Singles Chart, but peaked at number 33 on the NZ Hot Singles Chart.)	—	—	—	—		Dirty Blonde
"—" denotes a recording that did not chart or was not released.

=== As featured artist ===
Title	Year	Peak chart positions										Certifications	Album
Title	Year	US	AUS	CAN	GER	NLD	NOR	NZ	SWE	SWI	UK	Certifications	Album
"Sink or Swim" (Pierce Fulton featuring Bebe Rexha)	2012	—	—	—	—	—	—	—	—	—	—		Non-album single
"Take Me Home" (Cash Cash featuring Bebe Rexha)	2013	57	7	52	86	—	28	—	—	—	5	ARIA: Platinum; MC: Gold; RMNZ: Gold; BPI: Gold; RIAA: Platinum	Overtime and Blood, Sweat & 3 Years
"Hey Mama" (David Guetta featuring Nicki Minaj, Bebe Rexha and Afrojack)	2015	8	5	9	9	10	13	5	6	10	9	RIAA: 4× Platinum; ARIA: 2× Platinum; BPI: Platinum; BVMI: Platinum; GLF: 2× Platinum; IFPI AUT: Gold; IFPI NOR: 2× Platinum; IFPI SWI: Platinum; MC: 3× Platinum; RMNZ: 2× Platinum	Listen
"All the Way" (Reykon featuring Bebe Rexha)	2015	—	—	—	—	—	—	—	—	—	—		Non-album single
"That's How You Know" (Nico & Vinz featuring Kid Ink and Bebe Rexha)	2015	— (Note: "That's How You Know" did not enter the Billboard Hot 100, but peaked at number 20 on the Bubbling Under Hot 100 Singles chart.)	2	—	65	30	2	17	62	—	—	ARIA: Platinum; IFPI NOR: 4× Platinum; RMNZ: Platinum	Cornerstone
"Battle Cry" (Havana Brown featuring Bebe Rexha and Savi)	2015	—	59	—	—	—	—	—	—	—	—		Non-album singles
"Back to You" (Louis Tomlinson featuring Bebe Rexha and Digital Farm Animals)	2017	40	11	33	51	22	12	12	38	47	8	RIAA: Platinum; ARIA: 3× Platinum; BPI: Platinum; GLF: Gold; IFPI NOR: Platinum; MC: Platinum; RMNZ: Platinum	Non-album singles
"Girls" (Rita Ora featuring Cardi B, Bebe Rexha and Charli XCX)	2018	— (Note: "Girls" did not enter the Billboard Hot 100, but peaked at number three on the Bubbling Under Hot 100 Singles chart.)	52	72	69	73	—	— (Note: "Girls" did not enter the NZ Top 40 Singles Chart, but peaked at number one on the NZ Heatseeker Singles Chart.)	66	54	22	ARIA: Gold; BPI: Gold; IFPI NOR: Gold; RMNZ: Gold	Phoenix
"Call You Mine" (The Chainsmokers featuring Bebe Rexha)	2019	56	26	42	55	61	22	32	37	42	50	RIAA: 2× Platinum; ARIA: Platinum; BPI: Silver; IFPI NOR: Platinum; MC: Platinum; RMNZ: Platinum	World War Joy
"I'm Not Pretty (Remix)" (Jessia featuring Bebe Rexha)	2021	—	—	—	—	—	—	—	—	—	—		Non-album singles
"Family" (David Guetta featuring Bebe Rexha, Ty Dolla Sign and A Boogie wit da Hoodie)	2021	—	—	—	—	—	—	— (Note: "Family" did not enter the NZ Top 40 Singles Chart, but peaked at number 18 on the NZ Hot Singles Chart.)	— (Note: "Family" did not enter the Swedish Singellista Chart, but peaked at number seven on the Swedish Heatseeker Chart.)	78	—		Non-album singles
"If Only I" (Loud Luxury and Two Friends featuring Bebe Rexha)	2023	—	—	46	—	—	—	—	—	—	—	MC: Platinum	Non-album singles
"Dollars and Dimes" (Faithless featuring Bebe Rexha)	2025	—	—	—	—	—	—	—	—	—	—		Champion Sound
"—" denotes a recording that did not chart or was not released.

=== Promotional singles ===
Title	Year	Peak chart positions		Album
Title	Year	NZ Hot	SWE Heat.	Album
"That's It" (featuring Gucci Mane and 2 Chainz)	2017	—	—	All Your Fault: Pt. 2
"Count on Christmas"	2017	—	—	A Christmas Story Live!
"Ferrari"	2018	—	10	Expectations
"2 Souls on Fire" (featuring Quavo)	2018	—	—	Expectations
"Not 20 Anymore"	2019	38	—	Non-album promotional single
"Break My Heart Myself" (featuring Travis Barker)	2021	27	—	Better Mistakes
"American Citizen"	2021	—	—	We the People
"I Like You Better Than Me"	2026	—	—	Dirty Blonde
"Çike Çike"	2026	—	—	Dirty Blonde
"Hysteria"	2026	—	—	Dirty Blonde
"—" denotes a recording that did not chart or was not released.

== Other charted and certified songs ==
List of other charted and certified songs, with selected chart positions, certifications, showing album name and year released
Title	Year	Peak chart positions					Certifications	Album
Title	Year	JPN Intl.	NZ Hot	RUS Air.	SWE	UKR Air.	Certifications	Album
"Bad Bitch"	2017	—	—	—	—	—	MC: Gold; RMNZ: Gold	All Your Fault: Pt. 1
"(Not) The One"	2017	—	—	—	— (Note: "(Not) The One" did not enter the Swedish Top 100, but peaked at number 5 on the Swedish Heatseekers Chart.)	—		All Your Fault: Pt. 2
"Self Control"	2018	—	—	5	—	8		Expectations
"Girl in the Mirror"	2019	19	—	—	—	—	RIAJ: Gold (Note: Streaming Certification)	UglyDolls
"—" denotes a recording that did not chart or was not released.

== Other appearances ==
Title	Year	Other artist(s)	Album
"Yesterday"	2014	David Guetta	Listen
"This Is Not a Drill"	2014	Pitbull	Globalization
"Dare You" (acoustic version)	2015	Hardwell, Matthew Koma	United We Are
"Jingle Bells"	2015	Alex & Sierra	Welcome to Our Christmas Party
"Girl in the Mirror"	2019	None	UglyDolls
"Beautiful Life"	2019	None	Abominable

== Music videos ==
List of music videos, showing year released and directors
Title	Year	Other artist(s)	Director(s)	Ref.
As lead artist
"I Can't Stop Drinking About You"	2014	None	Mike MiHail	
"I'm Gonna Show You Crazy"	2015	None	Hannah Lux Davis	
"Me, Myself & I"	2015	G-Eazy	Taj Stansberry	
"No Broken Hearts"	2016	Nicki Minaj	Dave Meyers	
"In the Name of Love"	2016	Martin Garrix	Emil Nava	
"I Got You"	2017	None	Dave Meyers	
"F.F.F."	2017	G-Eazy	Emil Nava	
"The Way I Are (Dance with Somebody)"	2017	Lil Wayne	Director X	
"Meant to Be"	2017	Florida Georgia Line	Sophie Muller	
"Home"	2017	Machine Gun Kelly; X Ambassadors	David Ayer	
"Push Back"	2018	Ne-Yo; Stefflon Don	James Larese	
"Ferrari" (vertical video)	2018	None	Jamaica Craft	
"I'm a Mess"	2018	None	Sophie Muller	
"Last Hurrah"	2019	None	Joseph Kahn	
"Not 20 Anymore"	2019	None	Sophie Muller	
"You Can't Stop the Girl"	2019	None	Sophie Muller	
"Baby I'm Jealous"	2020	Doja Cat	Hannah Lux Davis	
"Sacrifice"	2021	None	Christian Beslauer	
"Sabotage"	2021	None	Christian Beslauer	
"Break My Heart Myself"	2021	Travis Barker	Christian Beslauer	
"I'm Good (Blue)"	2022	David Guetta	KC Locke	
"Heart Wants What It Wants"	2023	None	Michael Haussman	
"Satellite"	2023	Snoop Dogg	Juan M. Urbina	
"Seasons"	2023	Dolly Parton	Natalie Simmons	
"One In a Million"	2023	David Guetta	Corey Wilson	
"Chase It (Mmm Da Da Da)"	2024	None	Ace Bowerman	
"I'm the Drama"	2024	None	Jak Payne	
As featured artist
"Take Me Home"	2013	Cash Cash	DJay Brawner	
"Hey Mama" Note: credited but not featured	2015	David Guetta; Nicki Minaj; Afrojack	Hannah Lux Davis	
"All the Way"	2015	Reykon	Mike Ho	
"Battle Cry" Note: credited but not featured	2015	Havana Brown; Savi	The Squared Division	
"That's How You Know"	2015	Nico & Vinz; Kid Ink	RJ Collins & Pasqual Gutierrez	
"Back to You"	2017	Louis Tomlinson; Digital Farm Animals	Craig Moore	
"Girls"	2018	Rita Ora; Cardi B Charli XCX	Helmi	
"Call You Mine"	2019	The Chainsmokers	Dano Cerny	
"Harder"	2019	Jax Jones	Sophie Muller	
"Chain My Heart"	2021	Topic	Jason Lester	
"If Only I"	2023	Loud Luxury; Two Friends	Matt Shaffar	
"Stars"	2023	PNAU; Ozuna	Kuba Matyka and Kamila	

== Writing credits ==
Rexha has co-written for a number of artists, including:

Year	Artist	Album	Song
2009	Lee Hyori	Non-album singles	"As Long as I Love You" (featuring Will Pan)
2010	Nikki Williams	Non-album singles	"Glowing"
2010	Shinee	Lucifer	"Lucifer"
2011	Jelena Karleuša	Diva	"Muškarac koji mrzi žene"
2012	We the Kings	Party, Fun, Love, and Radio EP	"Party, Fun, Love, and Radio"
2013	Selena Gomez	Stars Dance	"Like a Champion"
2013	Eminem	The Marshall Mathers LP 2	"The Monster" (featuring Rihanna)
2014	Tinashe	Aquarius	"All Hands on Deck"
2014	Bella Thorne	Jersey	"Jersey"
2014	Bella Thorne	Jersey	"One More Night"
2016	Iggy Azalea	Non-album single	"Team"
2016	Nick Jonas	Last Year Was Complicated	"Under You"
2018	Logan Staats	The Launch Season 1 EP	"The Lucky Ones"
2019	Gryffin	Gravity	"Body Back" (featuring Maia Wright)
2019	Tate McRae	All the Things I Never Said	"Stupid"
2020	Selena Gomez	Rare	"Crowded Room" (with 6lack)
2023	Tyler Hubbard	Tyler Hubbard	"Tough"
2023	Mickey Guyton	House On Fire	"Nothing Compares To You" (featuring Kane Brown)
2024	Galantis	Rx	"One Cry" (featuring Rosa Linn)
2026	Diljit Dosanjh	TBA	"Ranjha" (with Sia and David Guetta)
