= All Your Fault Tour =

2017 concert tour by Bebe Rexha

- Tour by Bebe Rexha
- Associated album: All Your Fault: Pt. 1
- Start date: March 1, 2017
- End date: May 18, 2017
- Legs: 3
- No. of shows: 21 in North America; 1 in Asia; 7 in Europe; 29 in total

Bebe Rexha concert chronology
- All Your Fault Tour (2017); Bebe & Bassy Tour (2017)

The All Your Fault Tour was the first headlining concert tour by American singer-songwriter Bebe Rexha in support of her second EP, All Your Fault: Pt. 1 (2017). The tour was officially announced on January 24, 2017. The tour began on March 1, 2017, in Dallas, and the first leg concluded on March 31, 2017, in Brooklyn, finishing with a total of twenty-one shows. The first leg of the tour was supported by Daniel Skye. Rexha later announced the second leg of the tour, consisting of one Asian tour date in Dubai. The third leg of the tour began on May 1, 2017, in Antwerp, and concluded on May 18, 2017, in London.

== Background ==
On January 24, 2017, Rexha announced the tour through social media. Rexha also disclosed that a second tour leg with all international dates is to be announced in a few days. “I’m going to as many countries as possible for my #Rexhars,” she wrote on Twitter. On January 27, 2017, it was announced that the tour's Toronto venue would be moved from Mod Club to Phoenix Concert Theatre to accommodate for more people.

== Supporting acts ==
- Daniel Skye (North America)
- Spencer Ludwig (North America and Europe)
- Not3s (Europe)

=== Musicians ===
- Bebe Rexha - Main Performer, Vocals
- Omar Edwards - Musical Direction
- Adam Blackstone - Musical Direction
- Devine Evans - Music Programmer, Composer
- Dareck Cobbs - Keyboards, Music Programmer, Composer

== Set list ==
The following songs were performed on all dates, G-Eazy joined her for Me, Myself & I and F.F.F. in Santa Ana. The Monster was also performed on a few North American dates.

1. "Bad Bitch"
2. "Gateway Drug"
3. "Me, Myself & I"
4. "Atmosphere"
5. "Small Doses"
6. "In the Name of Love"
7. "Take Me Home"
8. "I'm Gonna Show You Crazy"
9. "I Can't Stop Drinking About You"
10. "F.F.F."
11. "Hey Mama"
12. "No Broken Hearts"
13. "I Got You"

== Tour dates ==
| Date | City | Country | Venue | Opening acts | Attendance | Revenue |
North America
| March 1, 2017 | Dallas | United States | Trees Dallas | Daniel Skye, Spencer Ludwig | 600 / 600 | — |
| March 2, 2017 | Houston | United States | House of Blues | Daniel Skye, Spencer Ludwig | — | — |
| March 3, 2017 | Austin | United States | Emo's | Daniel Skye, Spencer Ludwig | — | — |
| March 6, 2017 | Phoenix | United States | LiveWire | Daniel Skye, Spencer Ludwig | — | — |
| March 8, 2017 | Los Angeles | United States | Fonda | Daniel Skye, Spencer Ludwig | 1,200 / 1,200 | $31,025 |
| March 9, 2017 | Santa Ana | United States | The Observatory | Daniel Skye, Spencer Ludwig | — | — |
| March 11, 2017 | San Francisco | United States | Regency Ballroom | Daniel Skye, Spencer Ludwig | 1,423 / 1,423 | — |
| March 13, 2017 | Portland | United States | Wonder Ballroom | Daniel Skye, Spencer Ludwig | 778 / 778 | — |
| March 14, 2017 | Seattle | United States | The Crocodile | Daniel Skye, Spencer Ludwig | — | — |
| March 16, 2017 | Salt Lake City | United States | The Depot | Daniel Skye, Spencer Ludwig | — | — |
| March 17, 2017 | Denver | United States | Larimer Lounge | Daniel Skye, Spencer Ludwig | 250 / 250 | — |
| March 19, 2017 | Minneapolis | United States | Fine Line Music Café | Daniel Skye, Spencer Ludwig | — | — |
| March 20, 2017 | Chicago | United States | Metro Chicago | Daniel Skye, Spencer Ludwig | — | — |
| March 22, 2017 | Detroit | United States | The Majestic Theatre | Daniel Skye, Spencer Ludwig | — | — |
| March 23, 2017 | Toronto | Canada | Phoenix Concert Theatre | Daniel Skye, Spencer Ludwig | — | — |
| March 24, 2017 | Montreal | Canada | Le Belmont | Daniel Skye, Spencer Ludwig | — | — |
| March 26, 2017 | Philadelphia | United States | Underground Arts | Daniel Skye, Spencer Ludwig | — | — |
| March 27, 2017 | Boston | United States | The Sinclair | Daniel Skye, Spencer Ludwig | — | — |
| March 29, 2017 | New York City | United States | Irving Plaza | Daniel Skye, Spencer Ludwig | 1,025 / 1,025 | — |
| March 30, 2017 | Washington, D.C. | United States | U Street | Daniel Skye, Spencer Ludwig | 500 / 500 | — |
| March 31, 2017 | Brooklyn | United States | Warsaw | Spencer Ludwig, Naations | — | — |
Asia
| April 28, 2017 | Dubai | United Arab Emirates | Autism Rocks Arena | — | — | — |
Europe
| May 1, 2017 | Antwerp | Belgium | Trix Main Hall | Spencer Ludwig | — | — |
| May 2, 2017 | Cologne | Germany | Kantine | Spencer Ludwig | — | — |
| May 3, 2017 | Amsterdam | Netherlands | Paradiso | Spencer Ludwig | — | — |
| May 9, 2017 | Milan | Italy | Fabrique | Spencer Ludwig | 500/500 | $6,838 |
| May 14, 2017 | Barcelona | Spain | Razzmatazz 2 | Spencer Ludwig | — | — |
| May 16, 2017 | Paris | France | Yoyo | Spencer Ludwig | — | — |
| May 18, 2017 | London | England | KOKO | Spencer Ludwig | 830/830 | $17,752 |

== Cancelled shows ==
List of cancelled concerts, showing date, city, country, venue and reason for cancellation
| Date | City | Country | Venue | Reason |
|---|---|---|---|---|
| May 11, 2017 | Zürich | Switzerland | Komplex 457 | Illness |
