= Bebe Rexha =

American singer (born 1989)

- Rexha in 2026

Background information
- Born: Bleta Rexha; August 30, 1989 (age 37); New York City, U.S.
- Genres: Pop; R&B; dance; electronica
- Occupations: Singer; songwriter
- Instrument: Vocals
- Works: Discography; songs
- Years active: 2010–present
- Labels: DCD2; First Access; Island Def Jam; Warner; Empire
- Formerly of: Black Cards
- Website: beberexha.com
- Awards: Full list

Bleta "Bebe" Rexha (/ˈbiːbi ˈrɛksə/ BEE-bee REK-sə; born August 30, 1989) is an American singer and songwriter. She began her mainstream recording career as a vocalist for the pop band Black Cards in 2010, during and after which she was credited with co-writing releases for other artists—such as Eminem's Grammy Award-winning single "The Monster". She signed with Warner Records to release her debut extended play (EP), I Don't Wanna Grow Up (2015), which failed to chart domestically, but spawned the moderate international hit "I'm Gonna Show You Crazy".

Rexha released two additional EPs in 2017: All Your Fault: Pt. 1 and All Your Fault: Pt. 2, both of which spawned the singles "I Got You" and "The Way I Are (Dance with Somebody)" (featuring Lil Wayne). Rexha saw further success with her collaborations such as "Hey Mama" (with David Guetta, Nicki Minaj and Afrojack), "Me, Myself & I" (with G-Eazy), "In the Name of Love" (with Martin Garrix), and "Meant to Be" (featuring Florida Georgia Line)—the latter peaked at number 2 on the Billboard Hot 100 and was nominated for Best Country Duo/Group Performance at the 61st Grammy Awards. Rexha's debut studio album, Expectations (2018), peaked at number 13 on the Billboard 200 and yielded her a nomination for Best New Artist that same year. Her second and third albums, Better Mistakes (2021) and Bebe (2023), both entered the Billboard 200—the latter included the single "I'm Good (Blue)" (with David Guetta), which peaked at no. 4 on the Billboard Hot 100 and topped the charts in twenty-two countries. Her fourth studio album, Dirty Blonde, was released in 2026.

Throughout her career, Rexha has been nominated four times at the Grammy Awards and has won several accolades, including one Academy of Country Music Award, one MTV Video Music Awards, three Electronic Dance Music Awards and two Billboard Music Awards.

== Early life ==
Bleta Rexha (Albanian: [ˈblɛta ˈɾɛdʒa]) was born on August 30, 1989, in Brooklyn, New York City to Albanian parents from North Macedonia. Her father, Flamur Rexha, was born in Debar, North Macedonia when it was part of Yugoslavia and emigrated to the U.S. at the age of 21. Her mother, Bukurije, was born in the United States to an Albanian family with roots in Gostivar which is northeast of Debar and separated by Mavrovo National Park. In the Albanian language, bletë means "bee". She said, "My parents are Albanian, and people started calling me 'Bebe' for short." She and her family moved to nearby Grasmere, Staten Island when she was six. Rexha has a brother named Florent.

Rexha initially taught herself trumpet and later taught herself to play guitar and piano. She attended Tottenville High School on Staten Island. Rexha sang in the choir there and took part in a variety of musicals. While in high school choir, she discovered that she is a coloratura soprano.

As a teenager, Rexha submitted a song to be performed at the National Academy of Recording Arts & Sciences' annual "Grammy Career Day" event. Rexha earned the "Best Teen Songwriter" award; about 700 were in the competition. As a result, she signed a contract with talent scout Samantha Cox, who encouraged her to enroll in songwriting classes in Manhattan.

== Career ==
=== 2010–2015: Career beginnings & I Don't Wanna Grow Up ===
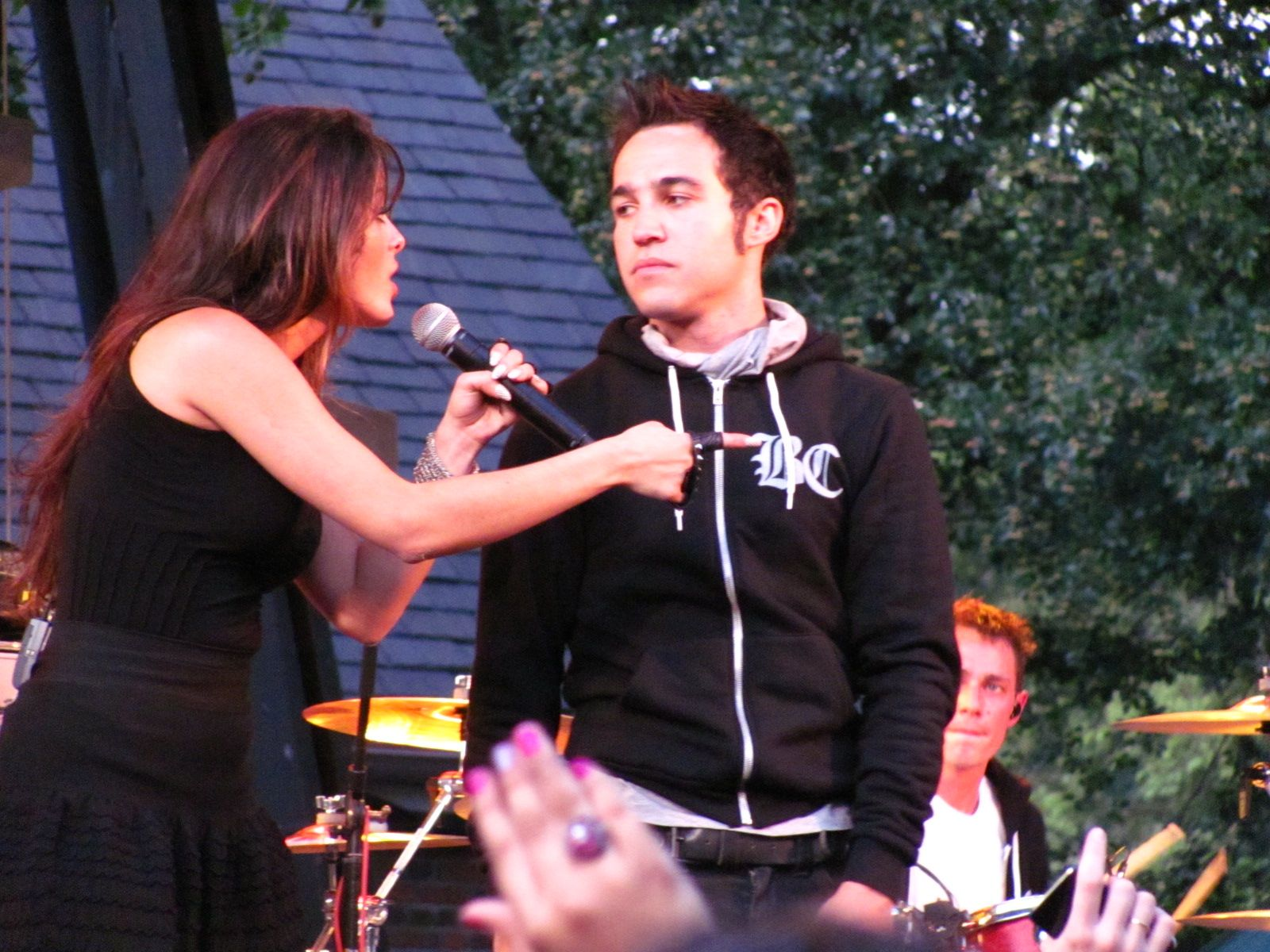
Rexha with Pete Wentz in 2011

Rexha had a short-lived deal with Island Def Jam, which they canceled. In 2010, she met Fall Out Boy's bassist Pete Wentz and began working with him at a recording studio in New York City. She became a member and a lead vocalist of Wentz's new experimental project called Black Cards. The band played a variety of live shows and released several singles and remixes. However, in January 2012, Wentz announced that Rexha had left the band to pursue other endeavors. Bebe Rexha was awarded the Abe Olman Scholarship for her contributions as a songwriter later that year.

In 2013, Rexha signed with Warner Bros. Records as a solo artist. On March 21, 2014, Rexha released her debut single, "I Can't Stop Drinking About You". The song peaked at number 22 on the US Top Heatseekers chart, while a music video was released on August 12, 2014. On May 12, 2015, she released her debut extended play, I Don't Wanna Grow Up, through Warner Bros. Records. The EP featured the single "I'm Gonna Show You Crazy" and the song would later go on to trend on social media platform TikTok in 2019 and 2020. In March 2016, Rexha released her single, called "No Broken Hearts" featuring Nicki Minaj. In April 2016, the music video was released, directed by Dave Meyer.

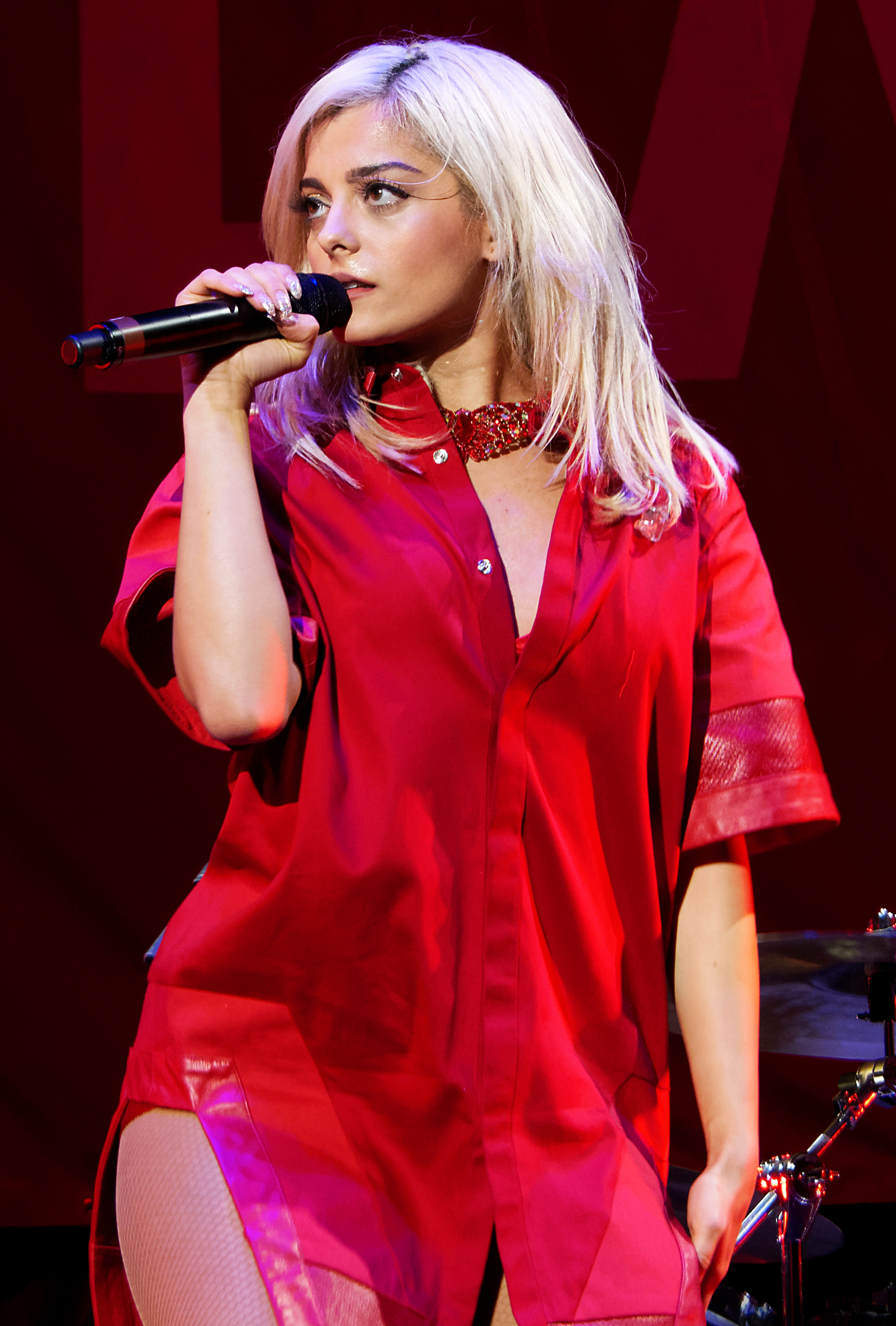
Rexha performing in 2016

=== 2016–2017: All Your Fault series ===
On October 28, 2016, Rexha released "I Got You", which peaked at number 43 on the US Billboard Hot 100, and at number 17 on the US Pop Songs chart. The music video was released on January 6, 2017. Direction changed from a full studio album to a multi EP project and "No Broken Hearts" was scrapped, making "I Got You" the first and only single from All Your Fault: Pt. 1, released on February 17, 2017. The EP peaked at number 51 on the Billboard 200. In March 2017 in Dallas, Rexha began her first solo headlining tour, promoting the EP across North America and Europe, named the All Your Fault Tour, with a total of 29 dates.

On November 6, 2016, Rexha hosted the 2016 MTV Europe Music Awards, at Rotterdam, Netherlands and performed multiple songs throughout the night, such as her single, "I Got You". In May 2017 she featured on the MTV The Ride documentary series.

On July 21, 2017, One Direction member Louis Tomlinson released the single "Back to You", with Rexha and Digital Farm Animals as featured artists. The song peaked at number 40 on the Billboard Hot 100.

"The Way I Are (Dance with Somebody)" featuring Lil Wayne was released as the first single from All Your Fault: Pt. 2 on May 19, 2017. On June 12, Rexha performed the song at the Ubisoft E3 press conference, before announcing Just Dance 2018, on which the song appears. The second EP as part of the project was released on August 11, 2017. In support of the EP and American singer and songwriter Marc E. Bassy's debut album, Rexha planned to go on a co-headlining tour across the United States: the Bebe & Bassy Tour, in October 2017. The tour was short-lived due to an infection putting Rexha on strict vocal rest, with Marc E. Bassy eventually going on a solo US tour in March 2018.

On October 24, 2017, "Meant to Be" with Florida Georgia Line was released as the second single from All Your Fault: Pt. 2, with the music video premiering a day earlier. The song peaked at number 2 on the Billboard Hot 100 and spent fifty weeks at number 1 on the US Hot Country Songs chart, breaking the record previously held by "Body Like a Back Road" by Sam Hunt.

=== 2018–2020: Expectations ===
In September 2017, Rexha began teasing new songs for a third installment in the All Your Fault series, with her manager going on record about its release. However, it appeared plans had changed, as Bebe revealed through a tweet in November 2017 that her next project would be called Expectations. Rexha revealed the cover art for this debut studio album on April 8, 2018, and the album was released on June 22, 2018. Previous singles from All Your Fault, "I Got You" and "Meant to Be" appear on Expectations as well.

On April 13, 2018, "Ferrari" and "2 Souls on Fire", the latter of which features Quavo of Migos, were released as promotional singles along with the pre-order. On June 15, 2018, "I'm a Mess" was released as the first single from the album. On November 20, 2018, "Say My Name" was released which featured David Guetta and J Balvin. In December 2018, Rexha was nominated for Best New Artist at the 61st Annual Grammy Awards.

On January 26, 2019, Rexha performed the songs “Me, Myself & I” and “Meant to Be” on stage at the SAP Center in San Jose, California as part of the festivities for the 2019 National Hockey League All-Star Game. On February 15, 2019, Rexha released her single "Last Hurrah". Later that month, it was announced that she would serve as the fifth coach for The Voice's Comeback Stage for season 16. Rexha tweeted in April 2019 that she has twelve songs ready for her second studio album, and that her new music is inspired by Britney Spears. On May 1, 2019, it was announced that Rexha will be one of the opening acts of the Jonas Brothers' Happiness Begins Tour. On May 31, Rexha and the Chainsmokers released "Call You Mine". The song is the Chainsmokers' third project using Rexha's voice, following their remixes of "Take Me Home" by production trio Cash Cash, and her debut solo single, "I Can't Stop Drinking About You".

=== 2021–2022: Better Mistakes ===
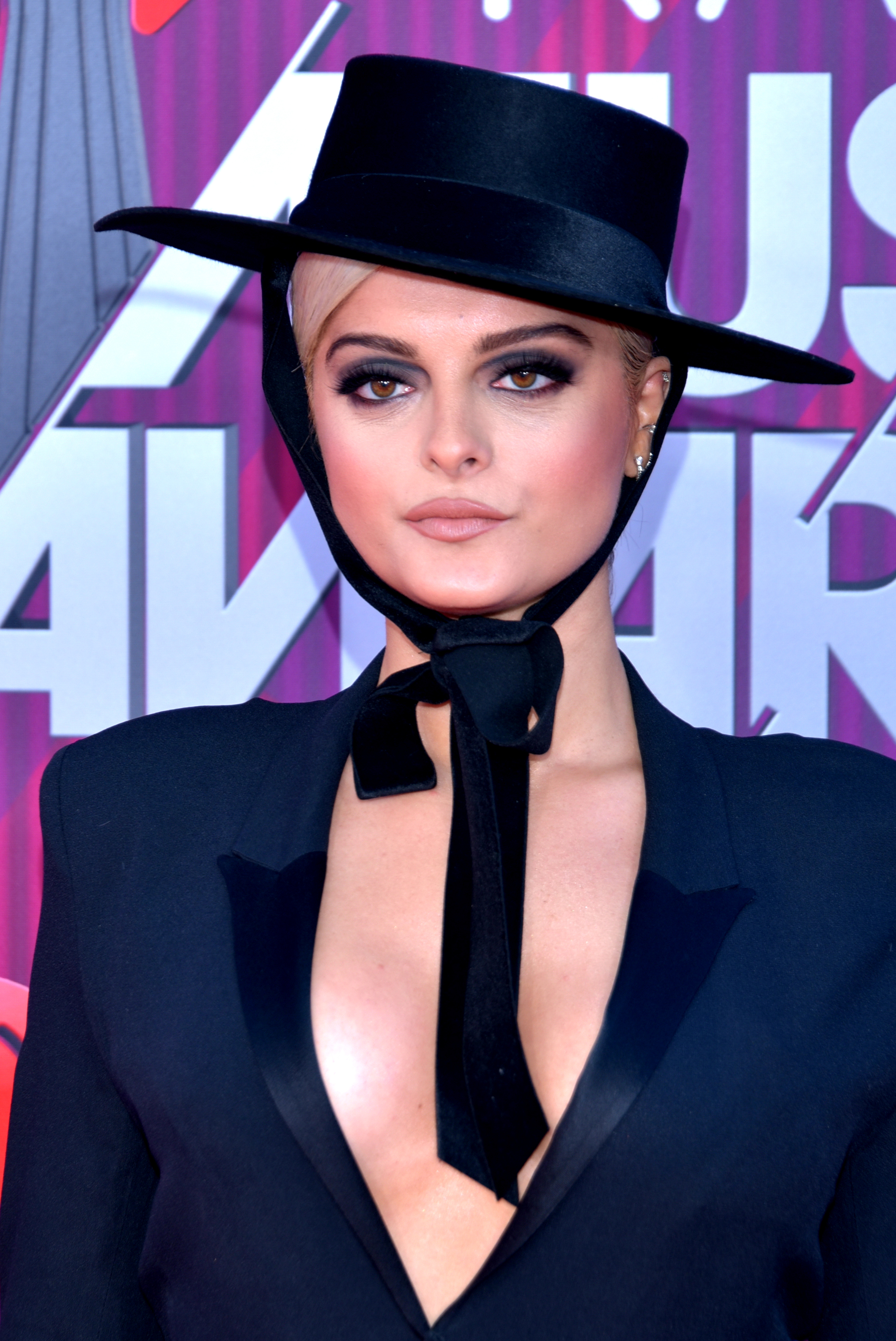
Bebe Rexha at the 2019 iHeartRadio Music Awards

Rexha gave further information on her second studio album in June 2019, confirming to Bang Showbiz, "I am heading off to the studio now and I am just creating, creating and creating." She further revealed a feminist theme to the new music, stating that "everything I have been writing now is very empowering and in-your-face and I am really excited about it." In July 2019, Rexha tweeted that she had a song called "Mama". In January 2020, Rexha confirmed in an interview with Ryan Seacrest on the red carpet of the 62nd Annual Grammy Awards that the album is inspired by her mental health journey, and that she "[has] a tracklisting and it's really exciting. I'm about to pick my next single... either a slower one or an up-tempo one." On October 9, 2020, she released "Baby, I'm Jealous" featuring Doja Cat. Rexha confirmed in an interview in October 2020 that the album would be a visual album however this never came to fruition.

On March 5, 2021, Rexha released her new single "Sacrifice", with the music video premiering later that day. In March 2021, she released an accessory line with Puma titled "Bebe X Puma", which is sold exclusively in Deichmann stores in Europe. On April 14, 2021, she announced that her second album Better Mistakes was scheduled for release on May 7, 2021. On May 7, she released her second studio album Better Mistakes, along with a music video for "Break My Heart Myself". The album debuted at #140 on the US Billboard 200.

On October 25, 2021, Rexha announced she would feature on "Family" by David Guetta featuring Ty Dolla Sign and A Boogie wit da Hoodie. On November 19, Masked Wolf released a remix of "Sabotage" titled, "It's You, Not Me". In August 2022, a remix of Eiffel 65's song "Blue (Da Ba Dee)", titled "I'm Good (Blue)", by David Guetta with vocals from Rexha was released after it went viral on TikTok.

=== 2023–2025: Bebe ===
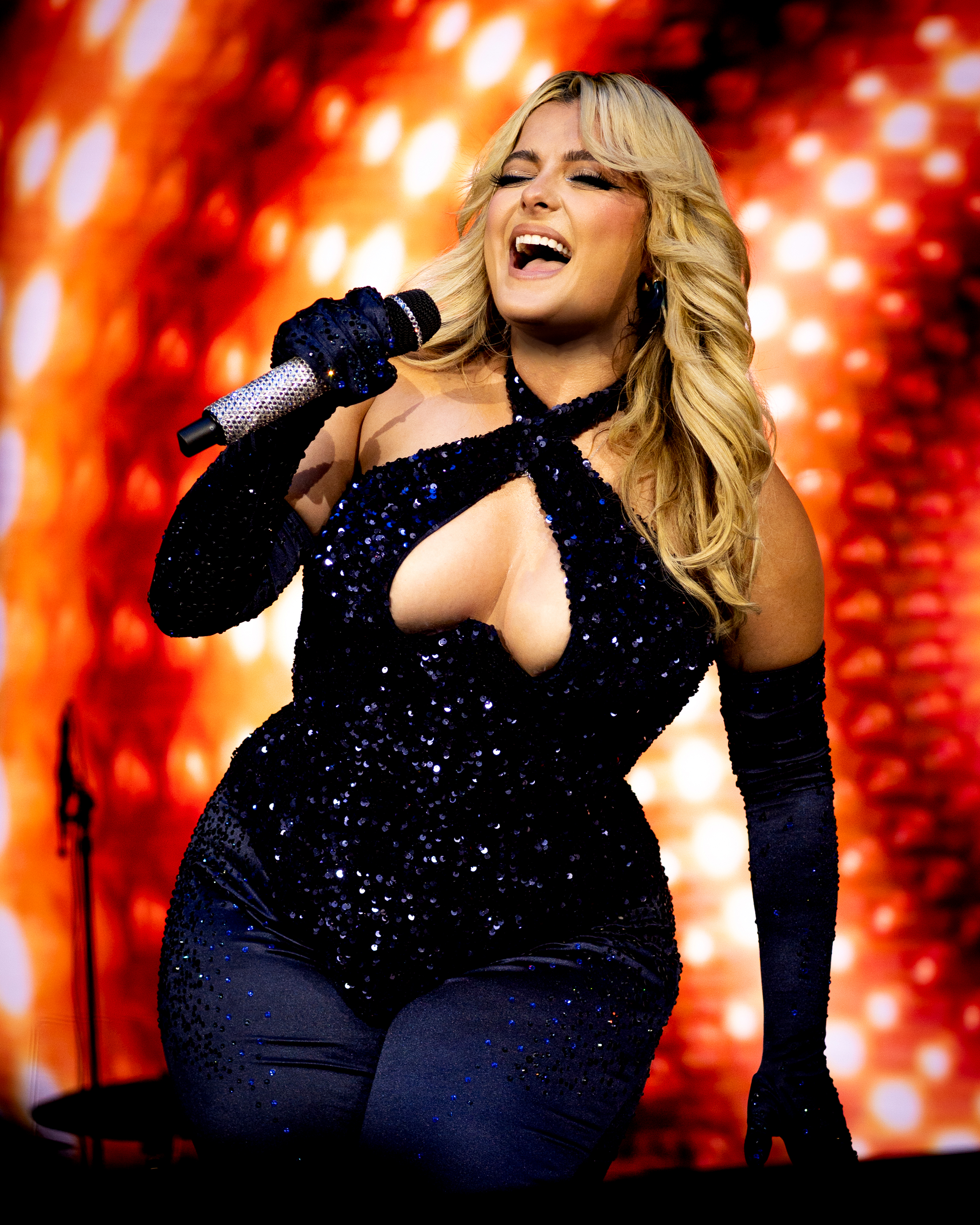
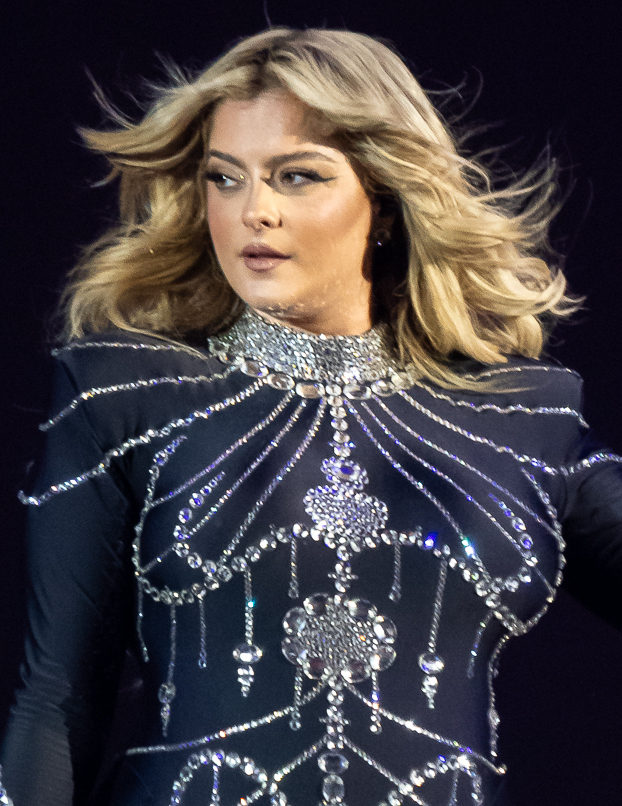
Rexha in 2023

On February 17, 2023, Rexha released the music video for "Heart Wants What It Wants", the lead single from her third studio album, Bebe. The album was released on April 28, 2023, and also includes second single, "Call on Me", released on March 31, 2023, as well as "I'm Good (Blue)". The album features appearances from Dolly Parton and Snoop Dogg. Rexha has described the album as being inspired by 1970s retro style. The album's third single, "Satellite" featuring Snoop Dogg, was released on April 20, 2023, accompanied by an animated music video uploaded on Rexha's YouTube channel. Bebe was released on April 28, 2023 through Warner Records.

At a June 2023 concert, a New Jersey man assaulted Rexha by throwing a cell phone at her head from the audience; she had a black eye and required stitches for her injuries. The man was quickly identified and arrested for assault and battery. Under interrogation, the assailant admitted to the act, saying that he figured it would make for a funny prank. Pending a hearing set for July 31, 2023, Rexha got a restraining order against him. On June 1, 2024, at a concert in Green Bay, Wisconsin, Rexha had multiple attendees removed by police for throwing items at her. In late June 2024, Rexha headlined Pride in London in Trafalgar Square to a crowd of over 20,000 people.

On April 25, 2025, Rexha was featured on English dance group Faithless's single "Dollars and Dimes". In December 2025, Rexha signed a new menagement deal with Timeline Management.

=== 2026–present: Dirty Blonde ===
In January 2026, Rexha announced she had departed from Warner Records and had signed with independent company Empire Distribution. Speaking to Variety, she described the partnership as "embracing every part" of herself. On February 11, 2026, Rexha announced her fourth studio album and first visual album, Dirty Blonde. The lead single "New Religion", which samples Faithless' "Insomnia", was released on March 6. The cover art was revealed via Rexha's instagram on April 9 alongside pre-orders. "Sad Girls" with David Guetta was released two weeks before the album on May 29 and afterwards the tracklist was revealed on June 4. Dirty Blonde came out on June 12 and became her second highest charting album (Note: Not including extended plays) on the Billboard 200 following her debut.

== Artistry ==
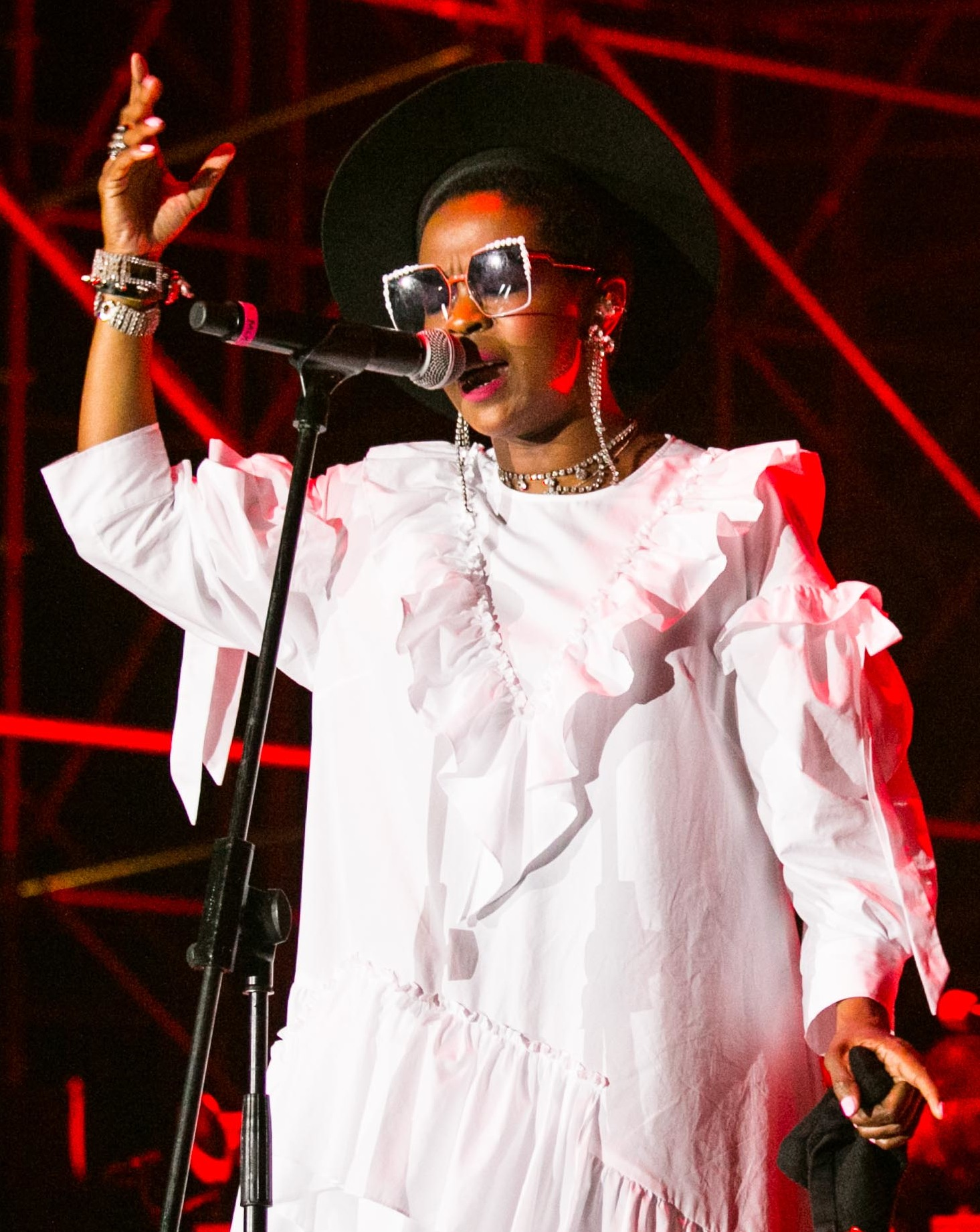
Rexha has cited Lauryn Hill as her biggest musical influence.

Rexha is described as a "pop chameleon". Her first songwriting credit was a K-pop song for Shinee, the title song from the album Lucifer, and since then she has released music primarily in the pop genre, but also incorporates R&B, dance, and electronica, while often spanning diverse styles of country, hip-hop, electronic, rock, and alternative rock.

She was mainly influenced by Lauryn Hill. Rexha was also influenced by other artists such as the Cranberries, Bob Marley, Kanye West, Madonna, Christina Aguilera, Beyoncé, Blondie, Pink, Alanis Morissette, Avril Lavigne, Coldplay, Johnny Cash, Dolly Parton, The Chicks, Shania Twain, Taylor Swift, Lady Gaga, and Carrie Underwood.

== Personal life ==
Rexha is a vocal supporter of the LGBTQ+ community; she says her sexuality is "fluid". In 2019, she revealed that she has bipolar disorder. In 2023, she was diagnosed with polyendocrine metabolic ovarian syndrome (PMOS). Rexha's natural hair color was described by herself as "black" and "dark brown", although she frequently dyes it blonde.

Rexha has opened up about being sexually harassed in various accounts. In September 2019, during an interview with Cosmopolitan, she described how she felt like she "was going to get raped" during one encounter with an unnamed producer in Los Angeles. "He's really famous," Rexha told the publication, before adding that her former managers pressured her to work with him because she "need[ed] a hit song."

Rexha began dating cinematographer Keyan Safyari in 2020. The singer announced their break-up in July 2023.

In July 2023, Rexha appeared on Celebrity Family Feud with her family; they competed against Nikki Glaser and Glaser's family.

In June 2024, Rexha, who was injured the previous year when she was struck by a phone thrown by a person in the crowd at a show in New York City, had multiple people removed from the audience during a concert in Wisconsin for throwing items in her direction. "If you want to hit me in the face, I had them press charges to the other guy. I would love to become richer," Rexha has stated about the incident. She later assured that she was making a "joke" and was "not inviting that" behavior.

Rexha claimed in a social media post that she was subjected to a hate crime when she was due to board the Munich-based Lufthansa plane on August 17, 2024. She spoke to a security agent in Albanian, resulting in her getting banned from the flight.

== Discography ==
- Expectations (2018)
- Better Mistakes (2021)
- Bebe (2023)
- Dirty Blonde (2026)

== Filmography ==
=== Film ===
Year	Title	Role	Notes
2019	UglyDolls	Tuesday	Voice
2021	Queenpins	Tempe Tina	

=== Television ===
Year	Title	Role	Notes
2016	MTV Europe Music Awards	Host	Event presented by MTV Networks Europe which awards prizes to musicians and performers
2017	Bebe Rexha: The Ride	Herself	Documentary which explores the moments that changed Rexha's life
2017	Pitch Battle	Guest Judge	Contest show which sees musical groups facing-off against each other, inspired by Pitch Perfect
2017	A Christmas Story Live!	Performer	A live musical television program inspired by the film of the same name and A Christmas Story: The Musical
2018	American Idol	Herself	Contestant mentor and celebrity duet singer
2018	Victoria's Secret Fashion Show	Herself/Performer	TV special
2019–2020	The Voice	Herself	Coach/advisor
2019	Celebrity Juice	Panelist	April 18, 2019
2020	Songland	Herself	Episode: "Bebe Rexha"
2020	RuPaul's Drag Race All Stars	Herself/Guest judge	Season 5 Episode: "The Charles Family Backyard Ball"
2021	Legendary	Guest Performer	Season 2

== Tours ==
Headlining

- All Your Fault Tour (2017)
- Best F*n Night of My Life Tour (2023)

Co-headlining

- Warped Tour (2015)
- Bebe & Bassy Tour (2017)

Opening act

- Nick Jonas – Nick Jonas: Live in Concert (2015)
- Ellie Goulding – Delirium World Tour (2016)
- Bruno Mars – 24K Magic World Tour (2018)
- Katy Perry – Witness: The Tour (2018)
- Jonas Brothers – Happiness Begins Tour (2019)

== See also ==
- List of Albanian Americans
- List of people with bipolar disorder
