= All Your Fault: Pt. 2 =

EP by Bebe Rexha
- Released: August 11, 2017
- Genre: Pop-trap; hip hop; R&B
- Length: 19:32
- Label: Warner Bros.
- Producer: Frank Dukes; Joel Little; Cubeatz; Jonas Jeberg; Murda Beatz; Stargate; Jason Gill; Willshire; Joey Moi

Bebe Rexha chronology
All Your Fault: Pt. 1 (2017)	All Your Fault: Pt. 2 (2017)	Expectations (2018)

Singles from All Your Fault: Pt. 2
- 1. "The Way I Are (Dance with Somebody)" Released: May 19, 2017; 2. "Meant to Be" Released: October 24, 2017

All Your Fault: Pt. 2 is the third extended play (EP) by American singer-songwriter Bebe Rexha. It was released on August 11, 2017, by Warner Bros. Records, as the follow-up to her second EP released in February of the same year, All Your Fault: Pt. 1. It features guest appearances from Gucci Mane, 2 Chainz, Lil Wayne, Kranium and Florida Georgia Line. The EP's lead single, "The Way I Are (Dance with Somebody)", was released earlier on May 19, 2017. The second single, "Meant to Be" released on October 24, peaked at number two on the Billboard Hot 100, and at number one on the Billboard Hot Country Songs chart.

== Background ==
Following the announcement of an expected release date of May 2017 and several delays and pushbacks, Bebe Rexha announced All Your Fault: Pt. 2 on June 29, 2017, and revealed its cover art. Louis Tomlinson's single in collaboration with Rexha and Digital Farm Animals, "Back to You", was initially rumored to appear on the EP. The EP was made available for pre-order on June 30, 2017.

"I Got Time" was intended to be titled as "What I Want" because of possible confusion with Rexha's previous single "I Got You", however days before the release, Rexha had changed her mind and returned to the original name.

== Release and promotion ==
"The Way I Are (Dance with Somebody)" featuring Lil Wayne was released as the lead single from the EP on May 19, 2017. The music video premiered on June 1, 2017.

"That's It" featuring Gucci Mane and 2 Chainz was released as a promotional single on August 4, 2017.

In support of the EP and American singer and songwriter Marc E. Bassy's debut album, Rexha planned to go on a co-headlining tour across the United States, the Bebe & Bassy Tour in October 2017. The tour was short-lived due to an infection putting Rexha on strict vocal rest, with Marc E. Bassy eventually going on a solo US tour in March 2018.

On October 24, 2017, "Meant to Be" was released as the second single from the EP with a music video premiere one the day before and has accumulated a total of 941 million views as of October 16, 2020. The song debuted at number one on the Hot Country Songs chart, becoming Rexha's first number one on the chart and the longest-running number-one single in the chart's history. It also peaked at number two on the Billboard Hot 100, making it Rexha's highest-charting single on the chart.

== Track listing ==
Credits taken from Qobuz and ASCAP.

All Your Fault: Pt. 2
No.	Title	Writer(s)	Producer(s)	Length
1.	"That's It" (featuring Gucci Mane and 2 Chainz)	Bleta Rexha; Tauheed Epps; Radric Davis; Theron Thomas; Shane Lindstrom; Kevin Gomringer; Tim Gomringer	Murda Beatz; Cubeatz	3:27
2.	"I Got Time"	Rexha; Thomas	Stargate	3:50
3.	"The Way I Are (Dance with Somebody)" (featuring Lil Wayne)	Rexha; Dwayne Carter; Clarence Coffee Jr.; Jacob Kasher; Joel Little; Jonas Jeberg; Shannon Rubicam; George Merrill	Little; Jeberg	3:07
4.	"(Not) The One"	Rexha; Jesper Borgen; Sara Hjellström; Jason Gill	Gill	3:01
5.	"Comfortable" (featuring Kranium)	Rexha; Andrew Wotman; Ali Tamposi; Kranium	Frank Dukes	3:24
6.	"Meant to Be" (featuring Florida Georgia Line)	Rexha; Tyler Hubbard; David Garcia; Josh Miller	Willshire; Joey Moi^{[a]}	2:43
Total length:				19:32

Notes

- ^{^[a]} signifies an additional vocal producer

Sample credits

- "The Way I Are (Dance with Somebody)" contains an interpolation of "I Wanna Dance with Somebody (Who Loves Me)", written by George Merrill and Shannon Rubicam, performed by Whitney Houston.

== Personnel ==
Credits adapted from the liner notes of All Your Fault: Pt. 2.

Performers and musicians

- Bebe Rexha – lead vocals, background vocals
- 2 Chainz – featured artist (1)
- Florida Georgia Line – featured artists (6), background vocals (6)
- Kranium – featured artist (5)
- Gucci Mane – featured artist (1)
- Lil Wayne – featured artist (3)
- David Garcia – drums (6), keys (6), guitars (6)
- Jason Gill – bass (4), all instruments (4)
- Andrew Watt – additional vocals (5)

Production

- Devon Corey – additional vocal engineering (1, 5), vocal recording (4), engineering (6)
- Jay Franco – mastering (1–2, 4)
- Frank Dukes – production (5)
- David Garcia – engineering (6), programming (6)
- Serban Ghenea – mixing (3–4, 6)
- Jason Gill – production (4), vocal recording (4)
- Josh Gudwin – mixing (5)
- Jonas Jeberg – production (3)
- Joel Little – production (3)
- Manny Marroquin – mixing (1)
- Joey Moi – additional vocal production (6)
- Murda Beatz – production (1)
- Will Quinnell – mastering (5)
- Stargate – production (2)
- Spike Stent – mixing (2)
- Andrew Watt – vocal engineering (5)
- Willshire – production (6)

Design and management

- Marius Sperlich – photography

== Charts ==
=== Weekly charts ===
Weekly chart performance for All Your Fault: Pt. 2
Chart (2017–18)	Peak position
Australia Hitseeker Albums (ARIA)	2
Canadian Albums (Billboard)	30
US Billboard 200	33

=== Year-end charts ===
Year-end chart performance for All Your Fault: Pt. 2
Chart (2018)	Position
US Billboard 200	108

== Certifications ==
Certifications for All Your Fault: Pt. 2
Region	Certification	Certified units/sales
Canada (Music Canada)	Platinum	80,000^{‡}
New Zealand (RMNZ)	Gold	7,500^{‡}
Singapore (RIAS)	Gold	5,000^{*}
^{*} Sales figures based on certification alone.^{‡} Sales+streaming figures based on certification alone.

== Release history ==
Release dates and formats for All Your Fault: Pt. 2
Region	Date	Format	Label	Ref.
Various	August 11, 2017	Digital download	Warner Bros.	
United States	November 3, 2017	CD	Warner Bros.	
United States	April 20, 2024	Vinyl	Warner Bros.	
