= Expectations (Bebe Rexha album) =

2018 studio album by Bebe Rexha

Studio album by Bebe Rexha
- Released: June 22, 2018
- Recorded: 2016–2018
- Genres: Pop; electropop
- Length: 43:47
- Label: Warner Bros.
- Producers: Bleta Rexha; Louis Bell; Miles Ale; Devon Corey; Captain Cuts; Jason Evigan; David Garcia; German; Hit-Boy; Jussifer; Joey Moi; Lauren Christy; The Monsters and the Strangerz; Ali P; Dre Pinckney; Robot Scott; The Stereotypes; Gian Stone; Andrew Wells; Willshire; Aaron Zuckerman

Bebe Rexha chronology
All Your Fault: Pt. 2 (2017)	Expectations (2018)	Better Mistakes (2021)

Singles from Expectations
- 1. "I'm a Mess" Released: June 15, 2018

Expectations is the debut studio album by American singer-songwriter Bebe Rexha. It was released on June 22, 2018, by Warner Bros. Records. The album was announced following the success of her collaboration with country duo Florida Georgia Line, "Meant to Be". Expectations went out for pre-order on April 13, 2018, with the release of two promotional singles: "Ferrari" and "2 Souls on Fire". The album includes the singles "I Got You" and "Meant to Be" from All Your Fault: Pt. 1 and All Your Fault: Pt. 2, respectively. It features appearances from rappers Quavo and Tory Lanez, along with Florida Georgia Line.

Expectations received generally positive reviews from music critics, who praised its production and Rexha's vocal performance, while others criticized its lyricism. The album debuted at number thirteen on the US Billboard 200 chart, earning 24,000 album-equivalent units (including 10,000 copies as pure album sales) in its first week. As of January 2019, the album has sold 604,000 units (with 37,000 copies in pure album sales) in the US. The album was later certified platinum by the Recording Industry Association of America (RIAA) for combined sales and album-equivalent units of over a million units in the United States.

== Background ==
Following the release of All Your Fault: Pt. 2 (2017), Rexha began teasing new songs for a third installment in the All Your Fault series, with her manager going on record about its release. However, it appeared plans had changed, as Rexha revealed her next project would be called Expectations through a tweet in November 2017. Rexha revealed the cover art on April 8, 2018, with the album being available for pre-order on April 13. Rexha has stated that she did not intend to release an album following her EPs, but "everything came together" so naturally and resulted in the record's creation.

== Singles ==
"I'm a Mess" was released as the lead single from the album on June 15, following an early radio release in the United States. It has so far peaked at number 35 on the Billboard Hot 100, becoming Rexha's first top 40 hit as a solo lead artist. "I Got You" and "Meant to Be" featuring Florida Georgia Line, from the first and second parts of All Your Fault respectively, were also included on the album.

=== Promotional singles ===
"Ferrari" and "2 Souls on Fire", the latter of which features Quavo of Migos, were released as promotional singles on April 13, 2018, with the pre-order of the album. "Ferrari" has since received a vertical video.

== Critical reception ==
Professional ratings
Aggregate scores
Source	Rating
Metacritic	65/100
Review scores
Source	Rating
AllMusic	3/5 stars
The Guardian	1/5 stars
Idolator	4/5 stars
The Independent	4/5 stars
NME	4/5 stars
Rolling Stone	3.5/5 stars
The Quietus	3.5/5 stars

Expectations received mostly positive reviews. According to Metacritic, which assigns a weighted mean rating out of 100 to reviews from mainstream critics, the album received an average score of 65, based on six reviews, indicating "generally favorable reviews". AllMusic's Neil Z. Yeung viewed the album as "an improvement upon her trio of EP releases that succeeds in presenting mature, forward-thinking pop of the dark, introspective variety" and concluded, "While it could benefit from some tightening – the middle stretch stalls the momentum – Expectations affirms Rexha's songwriting prowess, ear for catchy hooks, and ability to pull emotion from otherwise serviceable radio pop". Craig Jenkins from Vulture referred to the album as "a showcase for the versatility of her instrument, which is both high and hearty and also a little wan, capable of hitting incredible marks in its upper register at the cost of coming in a little shrill". He especially praised album's intriguing ideas, playful lyrics and memorable hooks, dubbing it "one of the week's easiest pleasures".

Ilana Kaplan and Nick Hasted from The Independent highlighted album's ballads "Grace" and "Knees", describing Expectations as "album full of flawed, self-deprecating and boundary-pushing pop offerings". Idolator's Mike Nied stated that the album "perfectly captures the superstar's ethos" and that Rexha's "very recognizable voice is absolutely riveting." Nevertheless, he opined that the inclusion of "Meant to Be" "feels out of place", despite being "her biggest hit to date". Nick Levine from NME perceived Rexha more as an "emo singer", while Refinery29's Courtney E. Smith described Rexha as an "anti-hero" and a "dangerous woman fiercely playing with themes of depression, a lack of self-control, and unpredictability". In addition, Smith expressed that the singer "did a masterful job of painting a nihilistic scene in which she's an observer, and sometimes an unreliable narrator", but emphasized a lack of "autobiographical impression". Rolling Stone's Sarah Grant wrote that on Expectations, Rexha "paints herself as a heroine trapped in an ivory tower of her own making, but her cat-scratching upper register suggests sensitivity more than vengeance", calling it "an impressive debut album full of nostalgic heartache". Tommy Monroe from The Quietus stated that "a few tracks do do lack energy", however he described Rexha as "no ordinary singer" and "a chameleon who can switch vocals, blend with any sound, and find rhythm with any tempo".

In a less positive review, Laura Snapes of The Guardian criticized the overuse of Auto-Tune and Rexha's "desperate search of an identity" throughout the album, citing "Ferrari" as the "only remotely distinctive song".

== Commercial performance ==
Expectations debuted at number 13 on the US Billboard 200 chart, earning 24,000 album-equivalent units (including 10,000 copies as pure album sales) in its first week. In Canada, the album debuted at number fourteen on the Billboard Canadian Albums . As of January 2019, the album has sold 604,000 units (with 37,000 copies in pure album sales) in the US. On October 23, 2020, the album was certified platinum by the Recording Industry Association of America (RIAA) for combined sales and album-equivalent units of over a million units in the United States.

== Track listing ==
Standard edition
No.	Title	Writer(s)	Producer(s)	Length
1.	"Ferrari"	Bleta Rexha; Jason Evigan; Asia Whiteacre	Evigan; Gian Stone^{[a]}	3:32
2.	"I'm a Mess"	Rexha; Jussi Karvinen; Justin Tranter; Meredith Brooks; Shelly Peiken	Jussifer; Devon Corey^{[a]}	3:15
3.	"2 Souls on Fire" (featuring Quavo)	Rexha; Quavious Marshall; Lauren Christy; Karvinen; Aaron Zuckerman	Jussifer; Zuckerman^{[b]}	2:50
4.	"Shining Star"	Rexha; Christy; Jacqetta Singleton; Scott Carter; Alexander Prawl; Dre Pinckney	Ali P; Robot Scott; Pinckney	3:06
5.	"Knees"	Rexha; Christy; Josh Miller; David Garcia	Garcia	3:26
6.	"I Got You"	Rexha; Ben Berger; Ryan McMahon; Ryan Rabin; Christy; Jacob Kasher Hindlin	Captain Cuts	3:11
7.	"Self Control"	Rexha; Christy; Andrew Wells	Wells; Corey^{[a]}	2:54
8.	"Sad"	Rexha; Stefan Johnson; Jordan Johnson; Marcus Lomax; Whiteacre; Oliver Peterhof	The Monsters and Strangerz; German; Corey^{[a]}	3:05
9.	"Mine"	Rexha; Chauncey Hollis, Jr.; Lionchild; Rachel Kennedy; Lance Shipp; Nathalia Marshall	Hit-Boy; Corey^{[a]}	2:51
10.	"Steady" (featuring Tory Lanez)	Rexha; Daystar Peterson; Whiteacre; Louis Bell	Bell	3:14
11.	"Don't Get Any Closer"	Rexha; Emily Warren; Scott Harris; Karvinen	Jussifer; Corey^{[a]}	2:48
12.	"Grace"	Rexha; Christy; Wells	Wells; Corey^{[a]}	3:16
13.	"Pillow"	Rexha; Whiteacre; Jonathan Yip; Raymond Romulus; Jeremy Reeves; Raymound McCollough II	The Stereotypes; Corey^{[a]}	3:36
14.	"Meant to Be" (featuring Florida Georgia Line)	Rexha; Tyler Hubbard; Miller; Garcia	Willshire; Joey Moi^{[a]}	2:43
Total length:				43:47

Japanese CD bonus tracks
No.	Title	Writer(s)	Producer(s)	Length
15.	"I Can't Stop Drinking About You" (Chainsmokers Remix)	Rexha; S. Johnson; J. Johnson; Lomax	The Monsters and the Strangerz; The Chainsmokers	4:23
16.	"I Got You" (Cheat Codes Remix)	Rexha; Berger; Christy; Hindlin; McMahon; Rabin	Captain Cuts; Cheat Codes	3:19
Total length:				51:29

Sample credit

- "I'm a Mess" contains an interpolation of the 1997 song "Bitch", performed by Meredith Brooks.

Notes

- ^{^[a]} signifies an additional vocal producer.
- ^{^[b]} signifies an additional producer.

== Personnel ==
Production

- Management – Adam Mersel
- Mitch McCarthy – mixing (tracks 1–5, and 7–13)
- Manny Marroquin – mixing (track 6)
- Emerson Mancini – mastering
- Ron Blake – trumpet (track 7)

== Charts ==
=== Weekly charts ===
Weekly chart performance for Expectations
Chart (2018)	Peak position
Australian Albums (ARIA)	19
Austrian Albums (Ö3 Austria)	71
Belgian Albums (Ultratop Flanders)	53
Belgian Albums (Ultratop Wallonia)	73
Canadian Albums (Billboard)	14
Czech Albums (ČNS IFPI)	60
Dutch Albums (Album Top 100)	58
French Albums (SNEP)	153
German Albums (Offizielle Top 100)	55
Irish Albums (IRMA)	40
Japan Hot Albums (Billboard Japan)	42
Japanese Albums (Oricon)	98
New Zealand Heatseeker Albums (RMNZ)	1
Norwegian Albums (VG-lista)	35
Scottish Albums (Official Charts)	28
Slovak Albums (ČNS IFPI)	73
South Korean International Albums (Gaon)	5
Spanish Albums (Promusicae)	54
Swiss Albums (Schweizer Hitparade)	31
UK Albums (Official Charts)	33
US Billboard 200	13

=== Year-end charts ===
Year-end chart performance for Expectations
Chart (2018)	Position
US Billboard 200	147
Chart (2019)	Position
US Billboard 200	142

== Certifications ==
Certifications for Expectations
Region	Certification	Certified units/sales
Canada (Music Canada)	2× Platinum	160,000^{‡}
Netherlands (NVPI)	Gold	20,000^{‡}
New Zealand (RMNZ)	Platinum	15,000^{‡}
Norway (IFPI Norway)	Platinum	20,000^{‡}
Singapore (RIAS)	Gold	5,000^{*}
United Kingdom (BPI)	Silver	60,000^{‡}
United States (RIAA)	Platinum	1,000,000^{‡}
^{*} Sales figures based on certification alone.^{‡} Sales+streaming figures based on certification alone.
