= I'm a Mess (Bebe Rexha song) =

- Remixes cover

Single by Bebe Rexha

from the album Expectations
- Released: June 15, 2018
- Recorded: 2017
- Genre: Electropop
- Length: 3:15
- Label: Warner Bros.
- Songwriters: Bleta Rexha; Justin Tranter; Meredith Brooks; Shelly Peiken; Jussifer
- Producers: Jussifer; Devon Corey

Bebe Rexha singles chronology
"Girls" (2018)	"I'm a Mess" (2018)	"Say My Name" (2018)

Music video
- "I'm a Mess" on YouTube

"I'm a Mess" is a song by American singer-songwriter Bebe Rexha from her debut studio album, Expectations (2018). It was released as the first and only single from the album on June 15, 2018, following an early radio release in the United States. The song is produced by Jussifer and vocal produced by Devon Corey. Commercially, the song reached the top 10 in Singapore as well as the top 40 in the United States and seven additional countries. It is certified Gold or higher in thirteen countries received an M&M’s certificate on October 9, 2018.

== Background and release ==
On September 18, 2017, a snippet for the song was shared by Rexha via her Instagram story, and its second snippet was released on April 20, 2018. On June 7, she announced that her then-upcoming debut album Expectations's first single, "I'm a Mess", would be released on June 15. Rexha serviced the song to the US radio stations, prior to the release. About the song, she stated: "[It] is about accepting your own imperfections, and not dwelling on them but rather celebrating them."

== Composition ==
"I'm a Mess" contains an interpolation of the 1997 song "Bitch", performed by Meredith Brooks. The electropop track was written by Rexha alongside Justin Tranter and Jussifer, while the latter handled production with Devon Corey.

== Music video and live performancss ==
The music video for "I'm a Mess" was directed by Sophie Muller and premiered on July 19, 2018. The video has over 450 million views as of September 2025. Rexha performed the song on The Tonight Show Starring Jimmy Fallon, the Teen Choice Awards, the 2018 MTV Europe Music Awards, the iHeartRadio Music Festival (along with "Meant to Be"), Big Brother, and America's Got Talent.

== Track listing ==
- Digital download
1. "I'm a Mess" - 3:15
- Digital download – Acoustic
1. "I'm a Mess" (Acoustic) – 2:33
- Digital download – Remixes
1. "I'm a Mess" (Ofenbach remix) — 2:44
2. "I'm a Mess" (Robin Schulz remix) – 3:20
3. "I'm a Mess" (Alphalove remix) – 3:11

== Charts ==
=== Weekly charts ===
Chart (2018–19)	Peak position
Argentina (Argentina Hot 100)	77
Australia (ARIA)	41
Belgium (Ultratip Bubbling Under Flanders)	17
Belgium (Ultratip Bubbling Under Wallonia)	30
Canada Hot 100 (Billboard)	25
Czech Republic Singles Digital (ČNS IFPI)	29
France (SNEP)	86
Germany (GfK)	86
Hungary (Stream Top 40)	31
Ireland (IRMA)	40
Malaysia (RIM)	15
New Zealand Hot Singles (RMNZ)	18
Norway (VG-lista)	18
Portugal (AFP)	90
Romania (Airplay 100)	87
Scottish Singles Sales (Official Charts)	59
Singapore (RIAS)	10
Slovakia Airplay (ČNS IFPI)	56
Slovakia Singles Digital (ČNS IFPI)	34
Sweden Heatseeker (Sverigetopplistan)	2
Switzerland (Schweizer Hitparade)	93
UK Singles (Official Charts)	77
US Billboard Hot 100	35
US Adult Pop Airplay (Billboard)	20
US Dance Airplay (Billboard)	17
US Pop Airplay (Billboard)	9

=== Year-end charts ===
Chart (2018)	Position
Canada (Canadian Hot 100)	91
US Mainstream Top 40 (Billboard)	37

== Certifications ==
Region	Certification	Certified units/sales
Australia (ARIA)	Platinum	70,000^{‡}
Brazil (Pro-Música Brasil)	3× Platinum	120,000^{‡}
Canada (Music Canada)	4× Platinum	320,000^{‡}
Denmark (IFPI Danmark)	Gold	45,000^{‡}
France (SNEP)	Gold	100,000^{‡}
Germany (BVMI)	Gold	200,000^{‡}
New Zealand (RMNZ)	Platinum	30,000^{‡}
Norway (IFPI Norway)	2× Platinum	120,000^{‡}
Poland (ZPAV)	2× Platinum	100,000^{‡}
Portugal (AFP)	Gold	5,000^{‡}
Spain (Promusicae)	Gold	30,000^{‡}
United Kingdom (BPI)	Gold	400,000^{‡}
United States (RIAA)	2× Platinum	2,000,000^{‡}
^{‡} Sales+streaming figures based on certification alone.

== Release history ==
Region	Date	Format	Version	Label	Ref.
United States	June 15, 2018	Digital download; streaming	Original	Warner Bros.	
Italy	June 22, 2018	Contemporary hit radio	Original	Warner Bros.	
United States	July 16, 2018	Hot adult contemporary	Original	Warner Bros.	
Various	October 19, 2018	Digital download	Acoustic	Atlantic	
United Kingdom	November 10, 2018	Hot adult contemporary	Original	Atlantic	
Various	November 30, 2018	Digital download	Remixes	Atlantic	
