= No Broken Hearts =

2016 single by Bebe Rexha

Single by Bebe Rexha featuring Nicki Minaj
- Released: March 16, 2016
- Recorded: 2015
- Genre: Club; electropop; urban pop
- Length: 3:59
- Label: Warner Bros.; Island
- Songwriters: Bleta Rexha; Onika Maraj; Jacob Kasher Hindlin; Koko LaRoo; Kgaugelo Nalane
- Producers: The Invisible Men; Salt Wives

Bebe Rexha singles chronology
"Me, Myself & I" (2015)	"No Broken Hearts" (2016)	"In the Name of Love" (2016)

Nicki Minaj singles chronology
"Down in the DM (Remix)" (2016)	"No Broken Hearts" (2016)	"Side to Side" (2016)

Music video
- "No Broken Hearts" on YouTube

"No Broken Hearts" is a song recorded by American singer-songwriter Bebe Rexha featuring Trinidadian rapper Nicki Minaj. It was released on March 16, 2016, and was originally intended as the lead single from her second EP All Your Fault: Pt. 1, however it is no longer on the track list of any project. It premiered on the Elvis Duran Show on NYC's Z100. The song was written by Rexha, Minaj, Koko LaRoo, Kgaugelo Nalane and Jacob Kasher Hindlin and produced by The Invisible Men and Saltwives.

== Background and composition ==
Bebe Rexha and Nicki Minaj first collaborated on the track "Hey Mama" for David Guetta's sixth studio album Listen. They performed the song live for the first time together during the iHeartRadio Summer Pool Party at Caesars Palace in Las Vegas on May 30, 2015.

In an interview for Elvis Duran Show, Rexha said that she wrote "No Broken Hearts" in a day when she felt ignored and abandoned. She went to the studio, put beats on the computer and free-styled the entire song in the recording booth. She kept most of what she recorded that day in the final version; even if it wasn't perfect, there was a feeling in it. She thought the song was special and social and decided to send the track to Nicki Minaj, who immediately jumped on it. In another interview for Zach Sang Show, Rexha said she wanted to recreate with Minaj the same success they had when collaborating for "Hey Mama".

== Critical reception ==
Craig Jenkins of Noisey Music by Vice wrote: ""No Broken Hearts" coasts on party platitudes and idyllic tropical grooves provided by Iggy Azalea collaborators the Invisible Men before bursting into a ginormous, irresistibly good spirited chorus about overcoming heartbreak. If that wasn't enough, Nicki Minaj pops up near the end for a blast of vibrant, whip-smart trash talk. ("They don't want beef, we proved it / Niggas better keep it on wax, no Q-tip.") "No Broken Hearts" is ace flex-on-your-ex music, and it's best we get used to hearing it everywhere now because Bebe's radio takeover is imminent."

Carver Low of HotNewHiphop said: "The song features cleverly used string melody to accompany the verses, and the chorus is 100% pop anthem. You better get used to hearing this one, because it's going to be your girl's go to turn up jam in not too long. Nicki Minaj contributes a fast-paced verse, and we're always happy to hear her spitting some dope bars."

Chriss Riotta of Mic said: "Nicki Minaj and Bebe Rexha's New Song "No Broken Hearts" is the breakup anthem you needed. The song is an electric-pop mesh with a heavy beat, sure to make waves at your next house party. Minaj comes through with yet another tight rap, while the lyrics focus on drinking, partying and liberating oneself from sadness."

David Watt of All Noise wrote: "The single has a female empowerment theme and it seems as if no one could have helped Bebe better than Nicki on this single.The single sounds good to the ears. The melody in verses is really powerful. It even sounds catchier than the chorus. The chorus is quite calm but then Bebe throws in chilling urban beats as soon as the chorus is over."

Peter Walsh of XXL Mag calls "No Broken Hearts," a track designed for the clubs and good times. "After Bebe clamors for everyone to leave their troubles behind once they enter the party, The Pinkprint rapper closes out the song with a slick-talking, punchy verse. Rapping about vacationing in Hawaii, Monica Lewinsky's affair with former President Bill Clinton and being hip-hop's MILF after all the sonning she has done in her career, Minaj proves once again why she is one of the most sought-after feature artists in the game."

== Music video ==
The official music video, directed by Dave Meyers, was released on April 7, 2016, on Bebe's account on YouTube. It stars Bebe Rexha and Nicki Minaj, with cameos from rapper G-Eazy and former America's Next Top Model contestant and musician Don Benjamin. Since its release, the music video has received over 300 million views.

== Live performances ==
Bebe Rexha has performed the song live at the Jimmy Kimmel Live on May 6, 2016 and at The Late Late Show with James Corden on June 16, 2016.

== Track listings ==
- Digital download
1. "No Broken Hearts" (featuring Nicki Minaj) – 3:59
- Digital download – The Remixes
1. "No Broken Hearts" (Ruby Rose Remix) – 5:12
2. "No Broken Hearts" (Jordan XL Remix) – 4:33
3. "No Broken Hearts" (Elephante Remix) – 3:25

== Credits and personnel ==
- Lead vocals – Bebe Rexha
- Featured vocals – Nicki Minaj
- Written by – Bebe Rexha, Nicki Minaj, Koko LaRoo, Jacob Kasher Hindlin
- Producer – The Invisible Men, Saltwives
- Backing vocals – LunchMoney Lewis, Jason Pebworth, Koko LaRoo
- Guitar – Alex Oriet, David Phelan, George Astasio
- Keyboards, programmed by – Alex Oriet, David Phelan, The Invisible Men
- Mixed by – Serban Ghenea
- Mixing engineer by – John Hanes

== Charts ==
Chart (2016)	Peak position
Belgium (Ultratip Bubbling Under Flanders)	26
Belgium Urban (Ultratop Flanders)	23
Canada Hot 100 (Billboard)	97
Czech Republic Singles Digital (ČNS IFPI)	73
Germany (GfK)	92
Slovakia Singles Digital (ČNS IFPI)	56
Sweden Heatseeker (Sverigetopplistan)	6
US Bubbling Under Hot 100 (Billboard)	9
US Pop Airplay (Billboard)	30
US Rhythmic Airplay (Billboard)	38

== Certifications ==
Region	Certification	Certified units/sales
Norway (IFPI Norway)	Gold	30,000^{‡}
Poland (ZPAV)	Platinum	50,000^{‡}
^{‡} Sales+streaming figures based on certification alone.
