= All Your Fault: Pt. 1 =

EP by Bebe Rexha
- Released: February 17, 2017
- Genre: Pop
- Length: 19:50
- Label: Warner Bros.
- Producer: Salt Wives; Captain Cuts; Stargate; The Invisible Men; Maths Time Joy; Gladius; Scott Robinson; The Wiild

Bebe Rexha chronology
I Don't Wanna Grow Up (2015)	All Your Fault: Pt. 1 (2017)	All Your Fault: Pt. 2 (2017)

Singles from All Your Fault: Pt. 1
- 1. "I Got You" Released: October 28, 2016; 2. "F.F.F." Released: February 17, 2017

All Your Fault: Pt. 1 is the second extended play (EP) by American singer-songwriter Bebe Rexha. It was released on February 17, 2017, by Warner Bros. Records. It features guest appearances from G-Eazy and Ty Dolla $ign. The EP's lead single, "I Got You", was released on October 28, 2016.

== Release and promotion ==
"I Got You" officially served as the lead single and was released on October 28, 2016. The music video debuted on January 6, 2017 and has accumulated a total of 310 million views as of January 1, 2020. The song entered the Billboard Hot 100 chart at number 94 on the issue dated January 21, 2017. It has since peaked at number 43. The music video for the song "F.F.F.", directed by Emil Nava, premiered on Entertainment Weekly's website on March 9, 2017. "Bad Bitch" was temporarily added to prominent playlists on Spotify and Apple Music.

Rexha embarked on her first headlining concert tour, All Your Fault Tour in support of it. The tour aired in North America, Asia, and Europe, which began on March 1, 2017 and lasted until May 18, 2017.

== Critical reception ==
Professional ratings
Review scores
Source	Rating
Idolator	4.5/5

Mike Wass of the music blog Idolator gave the EP four-and-a-half stars out of five, calling it "a testament to her [Rexha's] brilliant songwriting and supernatural ability to sniff out a hook".

== Track listing ==
Credits taken from Qobuz.

All Your Fault: Pt. 1
No.	Title	Writer(s)	Producer(s)	Length
1.	"Atmosphere"	Bleta Rexha; Koko LaRoo; Marco Borrero; Trey Campbell	The Wiild; Scott Robinson^{[b]}; Allan^{[a]}	3:11
2.	"I Got You"	Rexha; Ben Berger; Lauren Christy; Jacob Kasher Hindlin; Ryan McMahon; Ryan Rabin	Captain Cuts	3:11
3.	"Small Doses"	Rexha; Christy; Gladius; Lindsey Stirling	Gladius	3:17
4.	"F.F.F." (featuring G-Eazy)	Rexha; Berger; Christy; G-Eazy; McMahon	Captain Cuts	3:22
5.	"Gateway Drug"	Rexha; Christy; The Invisible Men; Salt Wives	The Invisible Men; Wives; Maths Time Joy^{[b]}	3:32
6.	"Bad Bitch" (featuring Ty Dolla $ign)	Rexha; Christy; Stargate; Ty Dolla Sign	Stargate	3:17
Total length:				19:50

All Your Fault: Pt. 1 / All Your Fault: Pt. 2 – Record Store Day limited edition vinyl
No.	Title	Writer(s)	Producer(s)	Length
7.	"That's It" (featuring Gucci Mane and 2 Chainz)	Rexha; Tauheed Epps; Radric Davis; Theron Thomas; Shane Lindstrom; Kevin Gomringer; Tim Gomringer	Murda Beatz; Cubeatz	3:27
8.	"I Got Time"	Rexha; Thomas	Stargate	3:50
9.	"The Way I Are (Dance with Somebody)" (featuring Lil Wayne)	Rexha; Dwayne Carter; Clarence Coffee Jr.; Kasher; Joel Little; Jonas Jeberg; Shannon Rubicam; George Merrill	Little; Jeberg	3:07
10.	"(Not) The One"	Rexha; Jesper Borgen; Sara Hjellström; Jason Gill	Gill	3:01
11.	"Comfortable" (featuring Kranium)	Rexha; Andrew Wotman; Ali Tamposi; Donaldson	Frank Dukes	3:24
12.	"Meant to Be" (featuring Florida Georgia Line)	Rexha; Tyler Hubbard; David Garcia; Josh Miller	Willshire; Joey Moi^{[a]}	2:43
13.	"I Got You" (Cheat Codes remix)	Rexha; Captain Cuts; Christy; Kasher; McMahon; Rabin	Captain Cuts; Cheat Codes^{[b]}	3:19
Total length:				42:42

Notes

- ^{^[a]} contains a vocal producer.
- ^{^[b]} contains an additional producer.
- "Small Doses" samples the song "First Light", written by Lindsey Stirling and James Wong and performed by Stirling.

== Personnel ==
Credits adapted from the liner notes of All Your Fault: Pt. 1.

Performers and musicians

- Bebe Rexha – vocals
- G-Eazy – rap (track 4)
- Ty Dolla Sign – rap (track 6)
- Sarah Button – violin (track 5)
- Captain Cuts – all instruments (track 2)
- Katherine Chibah – viola (track 5)
- Reiad Chibah – violin (track 5)
- Louise Dearsley – cello (track 5)
- The Invisible Men – keyboards (track 5)
- Maths Time Joy – keyboards (track 5)
- Alex Oriet – keyboards (track 5)
- David Phelan – keyboards (track 5)
- Lindsey Stirling – violin (track 3)

Production

- Mitch Allan – vocal production (track 1), mixing (track 1)
- Jose Balabuer – engineering (track 2)
- Captain Cuts – production (tracks 2, 4), programming (track 2), engineering (tracks 2, 4)
- Robin Florent – mix assistant (tracks 2, 4)
- Chris Galland – mix engineering (tracks 2, 4)
- Chris Gehringer – mastering (track 2)
- Gladius – production (track 3)
- Josh Gudwin – mixing (tracks 3, 5)
- The Invisible Men – production (track 5), recording (track 5), programming (track 5)
- Jeff Jackson – mix assistant (tracks 2, 4)
- Omar Loya – recording (track 5)
- Manny Marroquin – mixing (tracks 2, 4)
- Maths Time Joy – additional production (track 5), programming (track 5)
- Zeke Mishanec – mix assistant (track 3)
- Daniel Moyler – recording (track 5)
- Alex Oriet – programming (track 5)
- David Phelan – programming (track 5)
- Scott Robinson – additional vocal production (track 1)
- David Rodriguez – engineering (track 2)
- Stargate – production (track 6)
- Phil Tan – mixing (track 6)
- Kory Welty – mix assistant (track 5)
- Salt Wives – production (track 5)
- The Wiild – production (track 1)
- Bill Zimmerman – additional/assistant engineering (track 6)

Design and management

- The 92 Group – creative direction
- Blast!Music Management – management
- Sasha Samsonova – photography

== Charts ==
Chart (2017)	Peak position
Australian Digital Albums (ARIA)	38
Canadian Albums (Billboard)	31
Finnish Albums (Suomen virallinen lista)	27
New Zealand Heatseekers Albums (RMNZ)	5
Swedish Albums (Sverigetopplistan)	54
Swiss Albums (Schweizer Hitparade)	55
US Billboard 200	51

== Release history ==
Region	Date	Format	Label	Ref.
United States	February 17, 2017	Digital download	Warner Bros.	
United States	May, 2017	Vinyl	Warner Bros.	
United Kingdom	March 31, 2017	CD	Warner Bros.	
United States	April 20, 2024	Vinyl	Warner Bros.	
