= Say My Name (David Guetta, Bebe Rexha and J Balvin song) =

Single by David Guetta, Bebe Rexha and J Balvin

from the album 7
- Language: English; Spanish
- Released: 26 October 2018
- Recorded: 2018
- Genre: Dance-pop; Latin pop; reggaeton; moombahton
- Length: 3:18
- Label: What a Music; Parlophone; Warner Bros.; Atlantic
- Composers: David Guetta; Giorgio Tuinfort; Boaz van der Beatz; José Balvin; Alejandro Ramirez; Thomas Troelsen; Philip Leigh; Matt Holmes
- Lyricists: Emily Warren Schwartz; Britt Burton; José Balvin
- Producers: David Guetta; Giorgio Tuinfort; Boaz van der Beatz

David Guetta singles chronology
"Ice Cold" (2018)	"Say My Name" (2018)	"Better When You're Gone" (2019)

Bebe Rexha singles chronology
"I'm a Mess" (2018)	"Say My Name" (2018)	"Last Hurrah" (2019)

J Balvin singles chronology
"Mocca (Remix)" (2018)	"Say My Name" (2018)	"Reggaetón" (2018)

Music video
- "Say My Name" on YouTube

"Say My Name" is a song by French DJ and record producer David Guetta, American singer-songwriter Bebe Rexha and Colombian singer J Balvin. It was released as the seventh single from Guetta's album 7 on 26 October 2018. The track first charted upon the album's release in September 2018. It notably reached number two on Romania's Airplay 100 chart. It is certified Diamond in France and Gold or higher in fourteen additional countries.

== Background ==
It was reported by Spotify Latin America in July 2018 that Guetta was to release a collaboration titled "Say My Name" with Demi Lovato and J Balvin later in the month, but Guetta's manager Jean-Charles Carre announced on Instagram that the song was not being released, and Guetta instead issued "Don't Leave Me Alone" featuring Anne-Marie.

The following month, Guetta announced his album 7 and the song featured on the track listing as a collaboration with Bebe Rexha and Balvin. Rexha said of the song: "David and I had a lot of success with 'Hey Mama', but it was a weird time because I was credited with the song without being really known, [so] it was nice to have another song with him and everything start again from the beginning."

== Charts ==
=== Weekly charts ===
Chart (2018–2019)	Peak position
Argentina (Argentina Hot 100)	50
Australia (ARIA)	70
Austria (Ö3 Austria Top 40)	25
Belarus Airplay (Eurofest)	19
Belgium (Ultratop 50 Flanders)	23
Belgium (Ultratop 50 Wallonia)	10
Bulgaria (PROPHON)	4
Canada Hot 100 (Billboard)	59
CIS Airplay (TopHit)	7
Colombia (National-Report)	61
Croatia (HRT)	47
Czech Republic Singles Digital (ČNS IFPI)	84
Finland (Suomen virallinen lista)	13
France (SNEP)	12
Germany (GfK)	30
Greece International Digital Singles (IFPI)	53
Hungary (Dance Top 40)	1
Hungary (Rádiós Top 40)	6
Hungary (Single Top 40)	5
Hungary (Stream Top 40)	11
Ireland (IRMA)	58
Italy (FIMI)	65
Lebanon (Lebanese Top 20)	2
Netherlands (Dutch Top 40)	7
Netherlands (Single Top 100)	10
New Zealand Hot Singles (RMNZ)	10
Norway (VG-lista)	37
Poland Airplay (ZPAV)	4
Portugal (AFP)	50
Romania (Airplay 100)	2
Russia Airplay (TopHit)	11
Slovakia Airplay (ČNS IFPI)	4
Slovakia Singles Digital (ČNS IFPI)	51
Slovenia (SloTop50)	8
Spain (Promusicae)	18
Sweden (Sverigetopplistan)	30
Switzerland (Schweizer Hitparade)	14
Ukraine Airplay (TopHit)	1
UK Singles (Official Charts)	91
UK Dance (Official Charts)	12
US Bubbling Under Hot 100 (Billboard)	3
US Hot Dance/Electronic Songs (Billboard)	10

=== Year-end charts ===
Chart (2018)	Position
Hungary (Dance Top 40)	84
Netherlands (Dutch Top 40)	89
US Hot Dance/Electronic Songs (Billboard)	91
Chart (2019)	Position
Belgium (Ultratop Flanders)	90
Belgium (Ultratop Wallonia)	70
CIS (Tophit)	26
France (SNEP)	51
Guatemala (Monitor Latino)	11
Hungary (Dance Top 40)	6
Hungary (Rádiós Top 40)	18
Hungary (Single Top 40)	25
Netherlands (Dutch Top 40)	40
Netherlands (Single Top 100)	57
Poland (ZPAV)	29
Portugal (AFP)	126
Romania (Airplay 100)	20
Russia Airplay (Tophit)	57
Slovenia (SloTop50)	23
Switzerland (Schweizer Hitparade)	49
Ukraine Airplay (Tophit)	4
US Hot Dance/Electronic Songs (Billboard)	39
Chart (2020)	Position
Hungary (Dance Top 40)	51
Chart (2024)	Position
Hungary (Rádiós Top 40)	69
Chart (2025)	Position
Hungary (Rádiós Top 40)	70

== Certifications ==
Region	Certification	Certified units/sales
Austria (IFPI Austria)	Gold	15,000^{‡}
Belgium (BRMA)	Gold	20,000^{‡}
Canada (Music Canada)	Platinum	80,000^{‡}
Denmark (IFPI Danmark)	Gold	45,000^{‡}
France (SNEP)	Diamond	333,333^{‡}
Germany (BVMI)	Gold	200,000^{‡}
Italy (FIMI)	Platinum	50,000^{‡}
Mexico (AMPROFON)	Gold	30,000^{‡}
New Zealand (RMNZ)	Gold	15,000^{‡}
Norway (IFPI Norway)	Gold	30,000^{‡}
Poland (ZPAV)	3× Platinum	150,000^{‡}
Portugal (AFP)	Platinum	10,000^{‡}
Spain (Promusicae)	2× Platinum	120,000^{‡}
United Kingdom (BPI)	Gold	400,000^{‡}
United States (RIAA)	Platinum	1,000,000^{‡}
^{‡} Sales+streaming figures based on certification alone.

== Release history ==
Region	Date	Format	Label	Ref.
Italy	3 December 2018	Contemporary hit radio	Warner	
