= Last Hurrah (song) =

2019 single by Bebe Rexha

Single by Bebe Rexha
- Released: February 15, 2019
- Genre: Pop, emo
- Length: 2:30
- Label: Warner Bros.
- Songwriters: Bleta Rexha; Lauren Christy; Nick Long; Andrew Wells
- Producer: Andrew Wells

Bebe Rexha singles chronology
"Say My Name" (2018)	"Last Hurrah" (2019)	"Call You Mine" (2019)

Music video
- "Last Hurrah" on YouTube

"Last Hurrah" is a song by American singer Bebe Rexha. It was released as a single on February 15, 2019.

== Promotion ==
Rexha revealed the cover art and release date on social media on February 7, 2019, after teasing the title and its initials "LH" for a period of time. The cover art depicts Rexha, in close-up and in a red light, wearing a crown of thorns. She performed the song on Live with Kelly and Ryan on February 25 at the Dolby Theatre after the 91st Academy Awards ceremony. She performed the song again on The Late Show with Stephen Colbert on March 4.

== Critical reception ==
Mike Wass of Idolator called the track "an instantly catchy banger about making better choices" with a "defiant" chorus, saying that "Anyone with a self-destructive streak or knack for making bad decisions will feel every word."

== Track listing ==
- Digital download
1. "Last Hurrah" – 2:30
- Digital download
1. "Last Hurrah" (Acoustic) – 2:36
- Digital download
1. "Last Hurrah" (David Guetta Remix) – 3:11

== Charts ==
Chart (2019)	Peak position
Australia (ARIA)	65
Austria (Ö3 Austria Top 40)	70
Belgium (Ultratop 50 Flanders)	47
Belgium (Ultratip Bubbling Under Wallonia)	15
Canada Hot 100 (Billboard)	73
China Airplay/FL (Billboard)	39
Czech Republic Airplay (ČNS IFPI)	17
Czech Republic Singles Digital (ČNS IFPI)	30
France Downloads (SNEP)	172
Germany (GfK)	84
Greece (IFPI)	24
Hungary (Stream Top 40)	19
Ireland (IRMA)	31
Lithuania (AGATA)	18
Lebanon (The Official Lebanese Top 20 English Chart)	18
Netherlands (Dutch Top 40)	26
Netherlands (Single Top 100)	63
New Zealand Hot Singles (RMNZ)	14
Norway (VG-lista)	10
Portugal (AFP)	89
Romania (Airplay 100)	92
Scotland Singles (OCC)	20
Slovakia Singles Digital (ČNS IFPI)	22
Sweden (Sverigetopplistan)	57
Switzerland (Schweizer Hitparade)	77
UK Singles (OCC)	50
US Billboard Hot 100	98
US Adult Pop Airplay (Billboard)	23
US Dance/Mix Show Airplay (Billboard)	38
US Pop Airplay (Billboard)	22

== Certifications ==
Region	Certification	Certified units/sales
Brazil (Pro-Música Brasil)	Gold	20,000^{‡}
New Zealand (RMNZ)	Gold	15,000^{‡}
Norway (IFPI Norway)	Platinum	60,000^{‡}
Poland (ZPAV)	Gold	25,000^{‡}
United Kingdom (BPI)	Silver	200,000^{‡}
United States (RIAA)	Gold	500,000^{‡}
^{‡} Sales+streaming figures based on certification alone.

== Release history ==
Country	Date	Format	Version	Label	Ref.
Various	February 15, 2019	Digital download; streaming	Original	Warner Bros.	
Various	March 21, 2019	Digital download; streaming	Acoustic	Warner Bros.	
Various	April 19, 2019	Digital download; streaming	David Guetta Remix	Warner Bros.	
