= In the Name of Love (Martin Garrix and Bebe Rexha song) =

Single by Martin Garrix and Bebe Rexha
- Released: 29 July 2016
- Recorded: February 2016
- Genre: Future bass
- Length: 3:18
- Label: Stmpd; Epic Amsterdam; Sony Netherlands
- Composers: Martijn Garritsen; Matthew Radosevich; Stephen Philibin; Yael Nahar
- Lyricists: Ruth-Anne Cunningham; Ilsey Juber; Bebe Rexha
- Producers: Martin Garrix; Matt Rad; Steve James; Simon Says; DJ Isis

Martin Garrix singles chronology
"Oops" (2016)	"In the Name of Love" (2016)	"Wiee" (2016)

Bebe Rexha singles chronology
"No Broken Hearts" (2016)	"In the Name of Love" (2016)	"I Got You" (2016)

Music video
- "In the Name of Love" on YouTube

"In the Name of Love" is a song recorded by Dutch DJ and record producer Martin Garrix and American singer Bebe Rexha. The song was produced by Garrix, Matt Rad, Steve James and Simon Says. It was released on iTunes and streaming services after he premiered the song at Ultra Music Festival 2016. A remix EP was released on 11 November 2016, consisting of three remixes featuring DallasK, The Him and Snavs.

== Background and composition ==
"In the Name of Love" is a future bass song, which contains "a combination of piano, bass, and guitar strums [which] provide percussion throughout demure verses".

Garrix and Rexha used FaceTime when she was recording the song as he was not in the studio initially. The two later gathered together to finish it.

Garrix debuted the song by playing it on his set in March 2016 at the Ultra Music Festival 2016. He announced the release of the song on 24 July 2016 via his social media accounts and a Tomorrowland 2016 interview. In an interview, he said the "album is finished" and this song would appear as the first single from his upcoming album on which he said he was working. It was the first track released since his deal with Sony Music which would also be distributed by the latter.

When asked why he chose Bebe Rexha for the collaboration, Garrix said, "First of all, I love to hear her voice. I met her earlier this year in LA. She played me some of her demos and just straight away after the first song, I fell in love with her voice because it's so unique it's so different. The team and I were brainstorming and then Bebe ended up doing it, with a lot of sending back and forth, lots of shaping and polishing the song and then we finally came up with the version how the world knows it right now."

== Critical reception ==
Kat Bein of Billboard wrote that the song shows Garrix's artistic growth: "[it's] a far cry from the hard-hitting, stomp-ready beat of his breakthrough", and called the song "a charming track, as delicate as it is clean. It's Garrix sharing his softer side." Idolator's Rachel Sonis felt the song sounded "like the summer anthem we’ve been waiting for all along". The official music video was released on Apple Music on 9 August 2016 and on YouTube on 23 August 2016. It was directed by Emil Nava.

== Music video ==
The video opens with Rexha by the swimming pool on a springboard outside a mansion, surrounded by rushes of smoke, storm clouds and water explosions just after Garrix comes into the scene by walking towards a springboard standing just few feet away from her. He holds Rexha as they sink beneath the surface of water. The video has over 900 million views as of September 2025.

== Track listing ==
Digital download
No.	Title	Length
1.	"In the Name of Love"	3:18

Digital download – Remixes
No.	Title	Length
1.	"In the Name of Love" (DallasK Remix)	3:20
2.	"In the Name of Love" (The Him Remix)	3:29
3.	"In the Name of Love" (Snavs Remix)	3:00
Total length:		9:49

== Charts ==
=== Weekly charts ===
Chart (2016–2017)	Peak position
Argentina (Monitor Latino)	13
Australia (ARIA)	8
Austria (Ö3 Austria Top 40)	9
Belgium (Ultratop 50 Flanders)	13
Belgium (Ultratop 50 Wallonia)	15
Canada Hot 100 (Billboard)	19
Czech Republic Airplay (ČNS IFPI)	9
Czech Republic Singles Digital (ČNS IFPI)	6
Denmark (Tracklisten)	8
Dominican Republic (Monitor Latino)	14
Finland (Suomen virallinen lista)	9
France (SNEP)	26
France Airplay (SNEP)	6
Germany (GfK)	14
Germany Dance (Official German Charts)	4
Hungary (Rádiós Top 40)	24
Hungary (Single Top 40)	11
Ireland (IRMA)	7
Italy (FIMI)	10
Latvia (Latvijas Top 40)	10
Lebanon (Lebanese Top 20)	13
Netherlands (Dutch Top 40)	3
Netherlands (Single Top 100)	4
Netherlands (Dutch Dance Top 30)	3
Mexico (Billboard Mexico Airplay)	1
New Zealand (Recorded Music NZ)	8
Norway (VG-lista)	5
Poland Airplay (ZPAV)	65
Portugal (AFP)	7
Scottish Singles Sales (Official Charts)	11
Slovakia Airplay (ČNS IFPI)	52
Slovakia Singles Digital (ČNS IFPI)	6
Slovenia (SloTop50)	34
Spain (PROMUSICAE)	14
Sweden (Sverigetopplistan)	9
Switzerland (Schweizer Hitparade)	10
UK Singles (Official Charts)	9
UK Dance (Official Charts)	5
US Billboard Hot 100	24
US Adult Pop Airplay (Billboard)	37
US Dance Club Songs (Billboard)	1
US Hot Dance/Electronic Songs (Billboard)	3
US Pop Airplay (Billboard)	16
US Rhythmic Airplay (Billboard)	30

=== Year-end charts ===
Chart (2016)	Position
Argentina (Monitor Latino)	93
Australia (ARIA)	65
Austria (Ö3 Austria Top 40)	47
Belgium (Ultratop Flanders)	58
Belgium (Ultratop Wallonia)	77
Canada (Canadian Hot 100)	81
Denmark (Tracklisten)	68
France (SNEP)	88
Germany (Official German Charts)	60
Italy (FIMI)	55
Netherlands (Dutch Top 40)	17
Netherlands (Single Top 100)	28
Spain (PROMUSICAE)	80
Sweden (Sverigetopplistan)	68
Switzerland (Schweizer Hitparade)	69
UK Singles (Official Charts Company)	60
US Hot Dance/Electronic Songs (Billboard)	15

Chart (2017)	Position
Argentina (Monitor Latino)	82
Hungary (Stream Top 40)	85
Italy (FIMI)	99
Portugal Streaming (AFP)	96
US Hot Dance/Electronic Songs (Billboard)	15

== Certifications ==
Region	Certification	Certified units/sales
Australia (ARIA)	4× Platinum	280,000^{‡}
Austria (IFPI Austria)	Gold	15,000^{‡}
Belgium (BRMA)	Platinum	20,000^{‡}
Brazil (Pro-Música Brasil)	3× Diamond	750,000^{‡}
Canada (Music Canada)	3× Platinum	240,000^{‡}
Denmark (IFPI Danmark)	Platinum	90,000^{‡}
France (SNEP)	Diamond	233,333^{‡}
Germany (BVMI)	3× Gold	600,000^{‡}
Italy (FIMI)	4× Platinum	200,000^{‡}
Mexico (AMPROFON)	Diamond+3× Platinum	480,000^{‡}
Netherlands (NVPI)	Gold	20,000^{‡}
New Zealand (RMNZ)	4× Platinum	120,000^{‡}
Norway (IFPI Norway)	3× Platinum	180,000^{‡}
Poland (ZPAV)	4× Platinum	80,000^{‡}
Portugal (AFP)	2× Platinum	20,000^{‡}
Spain (Promusicae)	2× Platinum	80,000^{‡}
Sweden (GLF)	4× Platinum	160,000^{‡}
Switzerland (IFPI Switzerland)	Platinum	30,000^{‡}
United Kingdom (BPI)	2× Platinum	1,200,000^{‡}
United States (RIAA)	3× Platinum	3,000,000^{‡}
^{‡} Sales+streaming figures based on certification alone.
