= The Way I Are (Dance with Somebody) =

Single by Bebe Rexha featuring Lil Wayne

from the EP All Your Fault: Pt. 2
- Released: May 19, 2017
- Genre: Pop
- Length: 3:07
- Label: Warner Bros.
- Songwriters: Bleta Rexha; Dwayne Carter; Jonas Jeberg; Joel Little; Clarence Coffee Jr.; Shannon Rubicam; George Merrill; Jacob Kasher Hindlin
- Producers: Joel Little; Jonas Jeberg

Bebe Rexha singles chronology
"F.F.F." (2017)	"The Way I Are (Dance with Somebody)" (2017)	"Back to You" (2017)

Lil Wayne singles chronology
"I'm the One" (2017)	"The Way I Are (Dance with Somebody)" (2017)	"Love U Better" (2017)

Music video
- "The Way I Are (Dance With Somebody)" on YouTube

"The Way I Are (Dance with Somebody)" is a song by American singer-songwriter Bebe Rexha featuring American rapper Lil Wayne, from Rexha's third EP All Your Fault: Pt. 2. It was released on May 19, 2017, by Warner Bros. Records as the lead single from the EP. The single was leaked a week before its release, though it was deleted soon after. The single was serviced to pop radio on June 6, 2017. The song samples Whitney Houston's single "I Wanna Dance with Somebody (Who Loves Me)".

== Critical reception ==
Mike Wass of Idolator gave the song a positive review, calling the single "instantly hummable and sweet relief from the endless stream of left-of-center pop songs on radio."

== Music video ==
The music video directed by Director X was released on June 1, 2017. The fashion for the music video was inspired by vintage movies such as Grease. The video features video game Just Dance 2018 which the song is featured on. The video has over 250 million views as of September 2025.

== Live performances ==
Rexha and Wayne performed the single together on Jimmy Kimmel Live!. Rexha later performed the solo version of the song on Good Morning America as part of their Summer Concert Series.

== Track listing ==
- Digital download

No.	Title	Length
1.	"The Way I Are (Dance with Somebody)" (featuring Lil Wayne)	3:08

- Digital download

No.	Title	Length
1.	"The Way I Are (Dance with Somebody)"	3:03

- Digital download

No.	Title	Length
1.	"The Way I Are (Dance with Somebody)" (DallasK Remix)	3:02

== Charts ==
Chart (2017)	Peak position
Australia (ARIA)	72
Belgium (Ultratip Bubbling Under Wallonia)	10
Colombia (National-Report)	97
Czech Republic Singles Digital (ČNS IFPI)	99
New Zealand Heatseekers (RMNZ)	7
Romania (Airplay 100)	69
Slovakia Singles Digital (ČNS IFPI)	79
US Pop Airplay (Billboard)	34
Venezuela (National-Report)	7
