= I Got You (Bebe Rexha song) =

2016 single by Bebe Rexha

Single by Bebe Rexha

from the EP All Your Fault: Pt. 1
- Released: October 28, 2016
- Recorded: 2016
- Genre: Electronica
- Length: 3:11
- Label: Warner Bros.
- Songwriters: Ben Berger; Lauren Christy; Jacob Kasher Hindlin; Ryan McMahon; Ryan Rabin; Bleta Rexha
- Producer: Captain Cuts

Bebe Rexha singles chronology
"In the Name of Love" (2016)	"I Got You" (2016)	"F.F.F." (2017)

Music video
- "I Got You" on YouTube

"I Got You" is a song by American singer-songwriter Bebe Rexha from her second extended play (EP) All Your Fault: Pt. 1 (2017), and debut studio album Expectations (2018). It was released on October 28, 2016, as the lead single from the EP. The track was produced by production team Captain Cuts, and was also featured in a commercial for the Galaxy S21 FE. Commercially, the song reached the top 10 in Bulgaria.

== Composition ==
"I Got You" is a electronica song written in the key of A minor in common time with a tempo of 98 beats per minute. Most of the song follows a chord progression of Am-C-F-G-Am. The bridge follows a sequence of F-C-G-F-C-G-Dm-Em-F.

== Music video ==
The accompanying music video for "I Got You" was directed by Dave Meyers, and was released on January 6, 2017. It features scenes of Rexha dancing in a desert setting wearing outfits that drew comparisons to Kylie Jenner by Billboard.

Prior to the version that was released officially, Rexha filmed an alternate music video for the song that was scrapped due to its explicit content. She told a radio DJ, "It was actually too sexual so I had to get rid of it. It was too much," explaining further, "I have young fans. I like to be sexy 'cause I'm a woman now, but I still want to be a good role model. The video has over 402 million views as of September 2025."

== Live performances ==
The singer performed the song for the first time at the MTV Europe Music Awards on November 6, 2016. On January 13, 2017, she performed "I Got You" on Good Morning America along with her previous single "In the Name of Love". On January 16, 2017, she performed "I Got You" on The Tonight Show Starring Jimmy Fallon, on February 16, 2017, on Late Night with Seth Meyers, on February 17, 2017, on Live with Kelly and on February 22, 2017, along with the song "Say My Name" originally by Destiny's Child on The Late Late Show with James Corden.

== Track listing ==
- Digital download
1. "I Got You" – 3:11
- Digital download (Cheat Codes remix)
1. "I Got You" (Cheat Codes remix) – 3:19
- Digital download (acoustic version)
1. "I Got You" (acoustic version) – 3:12
- Digital download (Remixes EP)
1. "I Got You" (Cheat Codes Remix) – 3:19
2. "I Got You" (Party Pupils Remix) – 3:11
3. "I Got You" (SNBRN Remix) – 3:18
4. "I Got You" (The White Panda Remix) – 3:09

== Charts ==
=== Weekly charts ===
Chart (2016–2017)	Peak position
Australia (ARIA)	73
Austria (Ö3 Austria Top 40)	60
Belgium (Ultratip Bubbling Under Flanders)	14
Belgium (Ultratop 50 Wallonia)	22
Bulgaria (PROPHON)	5
Canada Hot 100 (Billboard)	38
CIS Airplay (TopHit)	4
Czech Republic Airplay (ČNS IFPI)	23
Czech Republic Singles Digital (ČNS IFPI)	28
Finland (Striimatuimmat)	48
Germany (GfK)	67
Hungary (Rádiós Top 40)	20
Hungary (Single Top 40)	24
Ireland (IRMA)	67
Italy (FIMI)	89
Lebanon (Lebanese Top 20)	17
Mexico Airplay (Billboard)	14
Netherlands (Single Top 100)	60
Netherlands (Dutch Tipparade)	8
Portugal (AFP)	33
Romania (Airplay 100)	22
Russia Airplay (Tophit)	4
Scotland Singles (OCC)	68
Slovakia Singles Digital (ČNS IFPI)	29
Sweden (Sverigetopplistan)	29
Switzerland (Schweizer Hitparade)	60
UK Singles (OCC)	91
US Billboard Hot 100	43
US Adult Pop Airplay (Billboard)	38
US Dance Club Songs (Billboard)	1
US Dance/Mix Show Airplay (Billboard)	33
US Pop Airplay (Billboard)	17
US Rhythmic Airplay (Billboard)	35

=== Year-end charts ===
Chart (2016)	Position
CIS (Tophit)	176
Russia Airplay (Tophit)	168
Chart (2017)	Position
CIS (Tophit)	74
Russia Airplay (Tophit)	86
Ukraine Airplay (Tophit)	91
US Dance Club Songs (Billboard)	44

== Certifications ==
Region	Certification	Certified units/sales
Australia (ARIA)	Platinum	70,000^{‡}
Brazil (Pro-Música Brasil)	3× Platinum	180,000^{‡}
Canada (Music Canada)	2× Platinum	160,000^{‡}
France (SNEP)	Gold	66,666^{‡}
Italy (FIMI)	Gold	25,000^{‡}
Netherlands (NVPI)	Gold	20,000^{‡}
New Zealand (RMNZ)	Gold	15,000^{‡}
Norway (IFPI Norway)	Gold	30,000^{‡}
Poland (ZPAV)	Platinum	20,000^{‡}
United Kingdom (BPI)	Silver	200,000^{‡}
United States (RIAA)	Platinum	1,000,000^{‡}
^{‡} Sales+streaming figures based on certification alone.

== Release history ==
Region	Date	Format(s)	Label	Ref.
United States	October 28, 2016	Digital download	Warner Bros.	
Italy	November 11, 2016	Contemporary hit radio	Warner Bros.	
United States	December 6, 2016	Contemporary hit radio	Warner Bros.	
United Kingdom	January 15, 2017	Contemporary hit radio	Warner Bros.	

== See also ==
- List of number-one dance singles of 2017 (U.S.)
