= Meant to Be (Bebe Rexha song) =

2017 single by Bebe Rexha featuring Florida Georgia Line

Single by Bebe Rexha featuring Florida Georgia Line

from the album Expectations
- Released: October 24, 2017
- Genre: Country pop
- Length: 2:43
- Label: Warner Bros.
- Songwriters: Bleta Rexha; Tyler Hubbard; Josh Miller; David Garcia
- Producers: David Garcia; Wilshire; Joey Moi

Bebe Rexha singles chronology
"Back to You" (2017)	"Meant to Be" (2017)	"Home" (2017)

Florida Georgia Line singles chronology
"Let Me Go" (2017)	"Meant to Be" (2017)	"Up Down" (2017)

Music video
- "Meant to Be" on YouTube

"Meant to Be" is a song by American singer-songwriter Bebe Rexha featuring American country music duo Florida Georgia Line, from Rexha's third extended play (EP) All Your Fault: Pt. 2 (2017), and debut studio album Expectations (2018). The song was released on October 24, 2017, by Warner Bros. Records as the second single from the EP. It holds the record for the most streamed country song of all-time on Spotify, and was nominated for Best Country Duo/Group Performance at the 61st Annual Grammy Awards.

"Meant to Be" reached the top ten in Australia, Canada, New Zealand, Norway, Sweden, and the United States, and was the third-bestselling song of 2018 in the US and the bestselling country song of the 2010s decade in the US. It is certified Diamond in the US and Canada, eight-times Platinum in Australia, and Gold or higher in fifteen additional countries. An acoustic version of the song not featuring Florida Georgia Line was released on April 6, 2018.

== Critical reception ==
"Meant to Be" received a generally favorable reception from music and country publications, with commentators praising its catchy songwriting, relaxed production, and successful blending of pop and country. Billboard described the song as a "match made in country-pop heaven", noting its crossover success across pop and country formats. Laura McClellan of Taste of Country called it "extremely catchy" and praised the "laid back" pop production, its "quality vocals", acoustic instrumentation and electronic percussion, while noting that the song actually possessed "a bit of a country soul, its lyrical sentiment fits well with the spirit of country music". Forbes contributor Hugh McIntyre described the song as a "surprise smash of the year" and later as a "country-pop smash", highlighting its crossover success and identifying it as Rexha's breakout hit as a lead artist. Chris DeVille of Stereogum wrote that "Meant to Be" had "straddled the worlds of pop and country more successfully than almost any brazen crossover attempt in recent memory" and praised its "soothing earworm chorus". Nick Levine of NME referred to it as Rexha's "cute country hit", describing it as a "loved-up smile" at the end of Expectations.

Some major critics were more ambivalent about the song's artistic qualities. Rob Harvilla of The Ringer described it as a "breezy" collaboration with a "soothing earworm chorus", but argued that it could come across as "terminally generic" to listeners who were not fans. Harvilla also quoted Jon Freeman, then editor of Rolling Stone Country, who called the song "catchy" while questioning whether it was a classic and attributing part of its chart dominance to its combination of pop streaming and country appeal.

Following the announcement of the 2019 Grammy Awards nominations, Forbes contributor Hugh McIntyre questioned the song's absence from the Record of the Year field. Brittany Hodak of Forbes similarly argued that, although "Meant to Be" received a nomination for Best Country Duo/Group Performance, its exclusion from the all-genre categories was unwarranted, writing that the song "certainly deserves to be recognized as one of the year's top Records" and, in her view, one of the year's top Songs as well.

=== Listicles ===
"Meant to Be" was included in numerous year-end and retrospective lists by music and country publications. In 2018, Billboard ranked it 11th on its list of the 20 Best Country Songs of the Year, while The Boot (website) placed it fifth among its Top 10 Country Collaborations of 2018. Taste of Country ranked the song third on its list of the 10 Hottest Summer Songs of 2018.

The song was subsequently featured in several retrospective decade lists, including those published by Billboard, Rolling Stone India and iHeartRadio, with Billboard ranking it 31st among the 35 Best Country Songs of the 2010s and Rolling Stone India placing it 26th among its Top 100 Songs of the Decade. Other publications also recognized the song in broader country retrospectives, including Smooth Radio, which ranked it second among the greatest country songs of the 2010s.

Select rankings of "Meant to Be"
Publication	List	Rank	Ref.
Billboard	Songs That Defined the Decade	—N/a	
Billboard	The 20 Best Country Songs of 2018	11th	
Billboard	The 35 Best Country Songs of the 2010s	31st	
Billboard	Top Hot Country Songs of the 21st Century	1st	
The Bobby Bones Show	Top 3 Songs of Summer 2018	2nd	
The Boot (website)	Top 10 Country Collaborations of 2018	5th	
The Boot (website)	Top 20 Best Country, Americana, Bluegrass and Folk Songs of 2018	—N/a	
The Current	Songs That Defined the Decade	—N/a	
Holler	The Best Country Songs of the 2010s	70th	
Holler	The Most Popular Country Songs	6th	
iHeartRadio	140 Songs That Defined the 2010s	—N/a	
Parade	101 Best Country Songs of All Time	98th	
Rolling Stone	10 Best Country Collaborations of 2018	—N/a	
Rolling Stone India	Top 100 Songs of the Decade	26th	
Smooth Radio	The 50 Greatest Country Songs of the 2010s	2nd	
Taste of Country	10 Hottest Summer Songs of 2018	3rd	
Whiskey Riff	The Top Country Song From Every Year of the 2010s	1st (2018)	

== Commercial performance ==
"Meant to Be" entered the US Billboard Hot 100 at number 61 on the chart dated November 11, 2017. It later peaked at number two, kept out of the summit by Drake's "God's Plan". It became Rexha's third top ten hit and her first as a solo lead artist, as well as the second top ten hit for Florida Georgia Line. It is Rexha's highest-charting single on the chart, surpassing "Me, Myself & I".

It also debuted atop the US Hot Country Songs chart, becoming Rexha's first entry on that chart and Florida Georgia Line's sixth number one. Rexha also became the first female artist to ever debut atop the chart, while "Meant to Be" is the third song overall to start at the summit since 2012, when the chart transitioned to a hybrid data list, blending airplay, streaming and sales. When the song spent an eleventh week in the top spot in February 2018, it surpassed Taylor Swift's "We Are Never Ever Getting Back Together" as the longest-running number one song on the chart for a lead female artist. In August 2018, the song broke the record previously held by 2017's "Body Like a Back Road" by Sam Hunt for the most weeks at number one on the US Hot Country Songs chart. After spending 50 weeks at the top, it was dethroned by Kane Brown's "Lose It". The song has sold 1,413,000 copies in the United States as of March 2019. In 2020, it was certified diamond for selling over 10 million units in the US.

== Impact ==
"Meant to Be" was cited by trade publications as a catalyst for a wave of pop–country collaborations in 2018. In a 2019 retrospective, Billboard wrote that although pop-meets-country collaborations had existed before, the song's "gargantuan success [...] smoothed the way" for later hits including Zedd, Grey and Maren Morris's "The Middle" and the Chainsmokers and Kelsea Ballerini's "This Feeling", and "blew the doors off any remaining stigma between pop artists appearing on country charts, or vice versa". Later that decade, the magazine grouped "Meant to Be" and "The Middle" as two of 2018's most ubiquitous hits and argued that the year "may have drawn the roadmap to a reliable new path to crossover success" on Top 40 radio. In June 2018, Nancy Dillon of Rolling Stone described the song as "the leading edge of a wave of pop-country collaborations that look to be a defining trend in 2018", placing it alongside "The Middle", Justin Timberlake and Chris Stapleton's "Say Something" and a Kane Brown remix of Camila Cabello's "Never Be the Same".

When it debuted at number one on the Billboard Hot Country Songs chart dated December 16, 2017, Rexha became the first woman to enter the ranking in the top position. Reviewing the song's subsequent record run among female-led singles, Jon Freeman of Rolling Stone wrote that Rexha, "a New Yorker with no prior country chart entries", occupied "the odd position of holding a country chart record among women, at a time when other women in country are finding it nearly impossible to get their songs played on radio".

== Accolades ==
Awards and nominations for "Meant to Be"
Organization	Year	Category	Result	Ref.
Academy of Country Music Awards	2019	Single of the Year	Nominated	
Academy of Country Music Awards	2019	Song of the Year	Nominated	
Academy of Country Music Awards	2019	Music Event of the Year	Nominated	
Academy of Country Music Awards	2019	Music Event of the Decade	Won	
American Music Awards	2018	Collaboration of the Year	Nominated	
American Music Awards	2018	Favorite Country Song	Nominated	
APRA Music Awards	2019	International Work of the Year	Nominated	
ASCAP Country Music Awards	2019	Winning Songwriters	Won	
ASCAP Pop Music Awards	2019	Winning Songwriters	Won	
Billboard Music Awards	2018	Top Country Song	Nominated	
Billboard Music Awards	2019	Top Country Song	Won	
Billboard Music Awards	2019	Top Radio Song	Nominated	
BMI Country Awards	2018	Award-Winning Songs	Won	
BMI Pop Awards	2019	Award-Winning Songs	Won	
BMI Pop Awards	2019	Song of the Year	Won	
Country Music Association Awards	2018	Musical Event of the Year	Nominated	
Country Music Association Awards	2018	Single of the Year	Nominated	
CMT Music Awards	2018	Collaborative Video of the Year	Nominated	
CMT Music Awards	2018	Video of the Year	Nominated	
Grammy Awards	2019	Best Country Duo/Group Performance	Nominated	
iHeartRadio Much Music Video Awards	2018	Best Collaboration	Won	
iHeartRadio Music Awards	2019	Best Collaboration	Nominated	
iHeartRadio Music Awards	2019	Country Song of the Year	Won	
iHeartRadio Titanium Awards	2019	1 Billion Total Audience Spins on iHeartRadio Stations	Won	
MTV Europe Music Awards	2018	Best Song	Nominated	
MTV Video Music Awards	2018	Best Collaboration	Nominated	
Nashville Songwriter Awards	2018	#1 Award	Won	
Nashville Songwriter Awards	2019	10 Songs I Wish I'd Written Award	Won	
Nickelodeon Kids' Choice Awards	2019	Favorite Collaboration	Nominated	
NMPA Songwriting Awards	2018	Platinum Anthem Award	Won	
Radio Disney Music Awards	2018	Best Collaboration	Nominated	
Radio Disney Music Awards	2018	Country Favorite Song	Won	
Spotify Plaques	2021	1 Billion Streams	Won	
Teen Choice Awards	2018	Choice Collaboration	Nominated	
Teen Choice Awards	2018	Choice Country Song	Won	

== Music video ==
The music video was filmed in Albuquerque, New Mexico and directed by Sophie Muller. It was released on October 23, 2017. As of October 2024, the video has over 1.2 billion views on YouTube.

== Live performances and cover versions ==
Rexha and Florida Georgia Line first performed "Meant to Be" together at the American Music Awards of 2017 on November 19, 2017, at the Microsoft Theater in Los Angeles. On December 19, Rexha sang the song on the season 13 finale of The Voice with contestants Adam Cunningham and Keisha Renee. The trio later performed it on The Tonight Show Starring Jimmy Fallon on January 23, 2018, at the 53rd Academy of Country Music Awards on April 15, 2018, at the MGM Grand Garden Arena in Las Vegas, and on The Ellen DeGeneres Show two days later. On June 10, 2018, they played the song at Nissan Stadium during CMA Fest; that performance was later released to streaming services as "Meant to Be (Live from CMA Fest 2018)". They also performed it on Good Morning America in Times Square in 2018. On September 10, 2019, Rexha sang the song with Kelsea Ballerini at Bridgestone Arena in Nashville while opening for the Jonas Brothers' Happiness Begins Tour.

In March 2018, Dan + Shay posted an official cover of the song to their YouTube channel. On January 26, 2019, Luke Bryan covered it with Lauren Alaina at Crash My Playa in Riviera Maya, Mexico. Kelly Clarkson opened the 2019 Billboard Music Awards on May 1, 2019, with a hits medley that began with "Meant to Be".

== Track listing ==
- Digital download and streaming
1. "Meant to Be" (feat. Florida Georgia Line) – 2:43
- Digital download and streaming
1. "Meant to Be" (Acoustic) – 2:38
- Digital download and streaming
1. "Meant to Be" (feat. Bebe Rexha) [Acoustic] – 2:44
- Digital download and streaming
1. "Meant to Be" (Live from CMA Fest 2018) – 3:02

== Credits and personnel ==
Credits adapted from Spotify and Tidal.

- Bebe Rexha – lead artist, lead vocals, backing vocals, songwriting
- Florida Georgia Line – featured artists, featured vocals, backing vocals
- Tyler Hubbard – songwriting
- David Garcia – drums, guitar, keyboards, programming, recording engineer, songwriting
- Josh Miller – songwriting
- Joey Moi – additional production, recording engineer, vocal production
- Willshire – additional production
- Serban Ghenea – mixing
- Devon Corey – recording engineer

== Charts ==
=== Weekly charts ===
Weekly chart performance for "Meant to Be"
Chart (2017–2019)	Peak position
Australia (ARIA)	2
Austria (Ö3 Austria Top 40)	49
Belgium (Ultratop 50 Flanders)	34
Belgium (Ultratip Bubbling Under Wallonia)	12
Brazil (Crowley Charts)	87
Canada Hot 100 (Billboard)	7
Canada AC (Billboard)	1
Canada CHR/Top 40 (Billboard)	13
Canada Country (Billboard)	7
Canada Hot AC (Billboard)	2
Czech Republic Airplay (ČNS IFPI)	61
Czech Republic Singles Digital (ČNS IFPI)	23
Denmark (Tracklisten)	38
Germany (GfK)	57
Greece International (IFPI)	40
Hungary (Stream Top 40)	28
Ireland (IRMA)	22
Israel International TV Airplay (Media Forest)	1
Latvia (DigiTop100)	26
Malaysia (RIM)	20
Netherlands (Dutch Top 40)	7
Netherlands (Single Top 100)	18
New Zealand (Recorded Music NZ)	5
Norway (VG-lista)	5
Philippines (BillboardPH Hot 100)	37
Portugal (AFP)	54
Scottish Singles Sales (Official Charts)	5
Singapore (RIAS)	28
Slovakia Airplay (ČNS IFPI)	57
Slovakia Singles Digital (ČNS IFPI)	28
Slovenia (SloTop50)	29
Sweden (Sverigetopplistan)	8
Switzerland (Schweizer Hitparade)	34
UK Singles (Official Charts)	11
US Billboard Hot 100	2
US Adult Contemporary (Billboard)	3
US Adult Pop Airplay (Billboard)	1
US Country Airplay (Billboard)	1
US Dance Airplay (Billboard)	11
US Hot Country Songs (Billboard)	1
US Pop Airplay (Billboard)	2
US Rhythmic Airplay (Billboard)	32

=== Year-end charts ===
2018 year-end chart performance for "Meant to Be"
Chart (2018)	Position
Australia (ARIA)	5
Belgium (Ultratop Flanders)	66
Canada (Canadian Hot 100)	7
Denmark (Tracklisten)	62
Iceland (Plötutíóindi)	44
Netherlands (Dutch Top 40)	39
Netherlands (Single Top 100)	53
New Zealand (Recorded Music NZ)	7
Sweden (Sverigetopplistan)	38
Switzerland (Schweizer Hitparade)	97
UK Singles (Official Charts Company)	47
US Billboard Hot 100	3
US Radio Songs (Billboard)	3
US Adult Contemporary (Billboard)	6
US Adult Top 40 (Billboard)	8
US Country Airplay (Billboard)	26
US Hot Country Songs (Billboard)	1
US Mainstream Top 40 (Billboard)	17

2019 year-end chart performance for "Meant to Be"
Chart (2019)	Position
US Adult Contemporary (Billboard)	22
US Hot Country Songs (Billboard)	10

Decade-end chart performance for "Meant to Be"
Chart (2010–2019)	Position
Australia (ARIA)	92
US Billboard Hot 100	89
US Hot Country Songs (Billboard)	1

== Certifications ==
Certifications for "Meant to Be"
Region	Certification	Certified units/sales
Australia (ARIA)	8× Platinum	560,000^{‡}
Belgium (BRMA)	Gold	10,000^{‡}
Brazil (Pro-Música Brasil)	Diamond	250,000^{‡}
Canada (Music Canada)	Diamond	800,000^{‡}
Denmark (IFPI Danmark)	Platinum	90,000^{‡}
France (SNEP)	Gold	100,000^{‡}
Germany (BVMI)	Gold	200,000^{‡}
Italy (FIMI)	Gold	25,000^{‡}
Netherlands (NVPI)	Platinum	40,000^{‡}
New Zealand (RMNZ)	7× Platinum	210,000^{‡}
Norway (IFPI Norway)	3× Platinum	180,000^{‡}
Poland (ZPAV)	Platinum	50,000^{‡}
Portugal (AFP)	Platinum	10,000^{‡}
Spain (Promusicae)	Gold	30,000^{‡}
Switzerland (IFPI Switzerland)	Gold	10,000^{‡}
United Kingdom (BPI)	2× Platinum	1,200,000^{‡}
United States (RIAA)	11× Platinum	11,000,000^{‡}
Streaming
Sweden (GLF)	2× Platinum	16,000,000^{†}
^{‡} Sales+streaming figures based on certification alone.^{†} Streaming-only figures based on certification alone.

== Release history ==
Release dates and formats for "Meant to Be"
Country	Date	Format	Version	Label	Ref.
United States	October 24, 2017	Contemporary hit radio	Original	Warner Bros.	
United States	November 20, 2017	Country radio	Original	Warner Bros.; BMLG	
Italy	February 2, 2018	Contemporary hit radio	Original	Warner	
United Kingdom	March 9, 2018	Contemporary hit radio	Original	Warner	
United Kingdom	April 6, 2018	Digital download	Acoustic	Warner Bros. Records	
Various	December 22, 2018	Digital download	Live from CMA Fest 2018	BMLG	
