= List of songs recorded by Bebe Rexha =

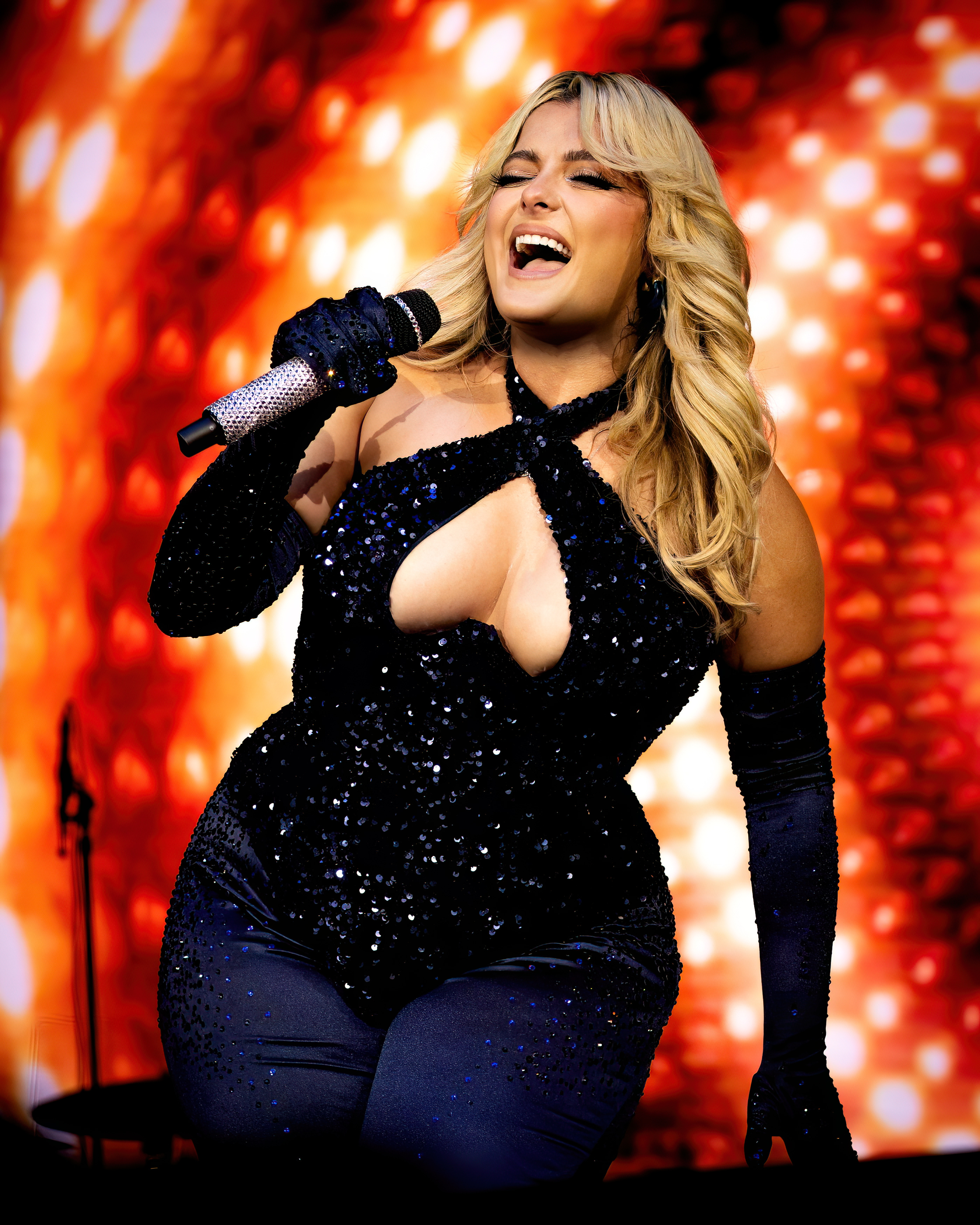
Rexha performing at Untold Festival in June 2023

American singer and songwriter Bebe Rexha has recorded songs for three studio albums and three extended plays (EP) as well as various soundtracks and collaborative projects. She learned to play the guitar, piano, and trumpet as a child and started producing her own beats using Pro Tools. Rexha began writing songs with her friends at school and won the title of "Best Teen Songwriter" at a Grammy competition. Aged 19, she became the lead vocalist of the American band Black Cards and subsequently left it to pursue a career as a songwriter and solo artist. Rexha signed a contract with Warner Bros. Records in 2013 and released her debut single, "I Can't Stop Drinking About You", in March the following year. It preceded her debut EP, I Don't Wanna Grow Up, which was released by Warner Bros. in May 2015. That year, she also featured on David Guetta's single "Hey Mama" and released the song "Me, Myself & I" with G-Eazy.

In 2017, Rexha released two EPs which included her collaborations with hip hop artists. All Your Fault: Pt. 1 featured G-Eazy and Ty Dolla Sign, and All Your Fault: Pt. 2 featured Gucci Mane, 2 Chainz, Lil Wayne, and Kranium, as well as the country duo Florida Georgia Line. The Florida Georgia Line collaboration, "Meant to Be" (2017), reached number two on the US Billboard Hot 100 and spent 50 weeks atop the Hot Country Songs chart. It earned a nomination for the Grammy Award for Best Country Duo/Group Performance. It was included on her pop debut studio album, Expectations (2018). In 2018, Rexha collaborated with Guetta again on the song "Say My Name" and featured on Rita Ora's song "Girls". She featured on the Chainsmokers' single "Call You Mine" and released the songs "Last Hurrah" and "You Can't Stop the Girl" the following year.

"Baby, I'm Jealous" (2020), the lead single from Rexha's second studio album, Better Mistakes (2021), featured a guest appearance by Doja Cat. Warner released the album in 2021, with additional features from Ty Dolla Sign, Travis Barker, Trevor Daniel, Lil Uzi Vert, Pink Sweats, Lunay, and Rick Ross. The following year, Rexha reunited with Guetta for the single "I'm Good (Blue)", which spent 55 weeks atop the Dance/Electronic Songs chart and earned a nomination for the Grammy Award for Best Dance/Electronic Recording. The song led her pop and dance-pop third studio album, Bebe (2023), which featured Snoop Dogg and Dolly Parton. Later in 2023, Rexha released the song "Stars" with Pnau and Ozuna, "One in a Million" with Guetta, and "Heart Still Beating" with Nathan Dawe.

== Songs ==
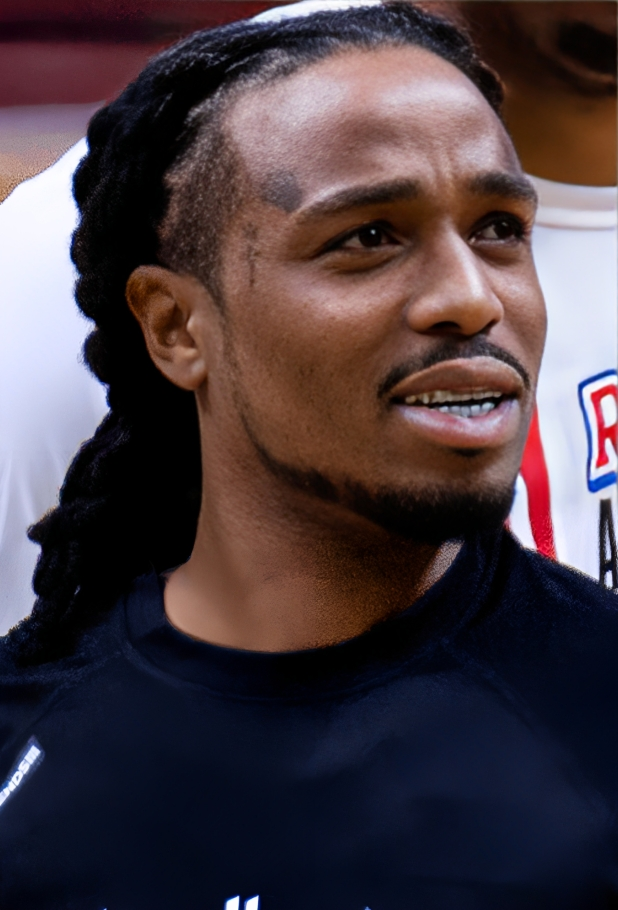
Quavo features on "2 Souls on Fire".

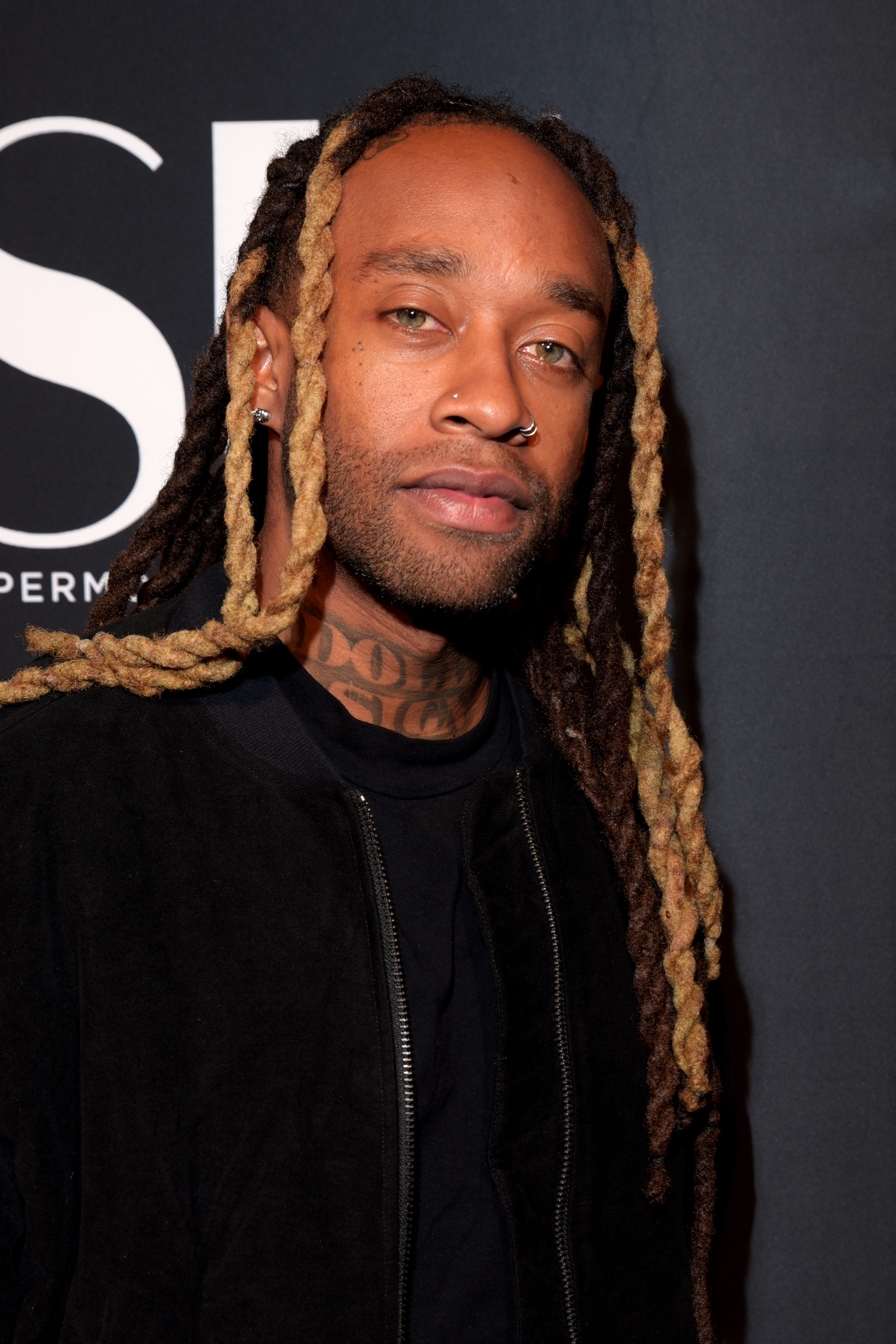
Ty Dolla Sign and Rexha have collaborated on various songs, including "Bad Bitch", "Family", and "My Dear Love".

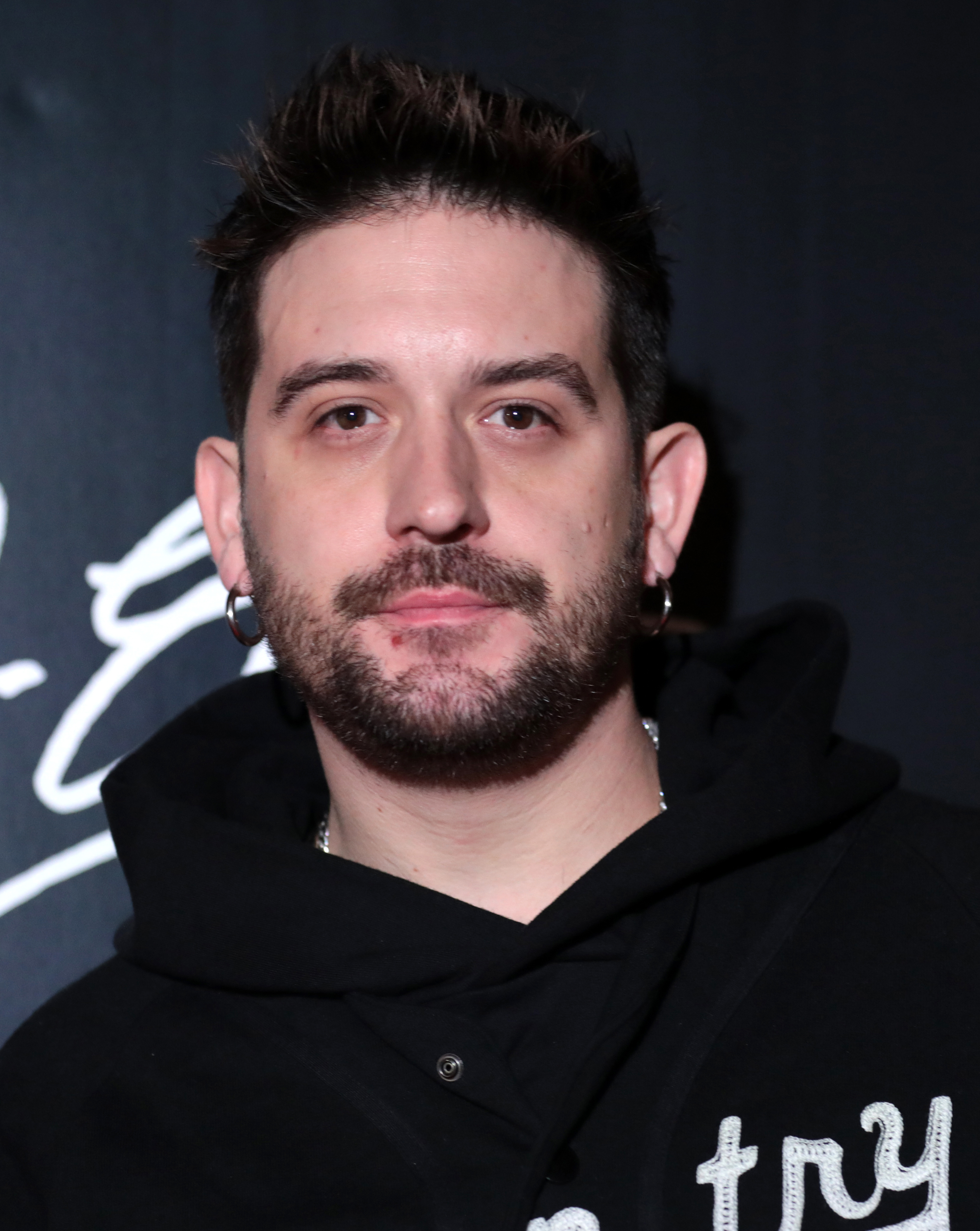
G-Eazy and Rexha have collaborated on the songs "F.F.F." and "Me, Myself & I".

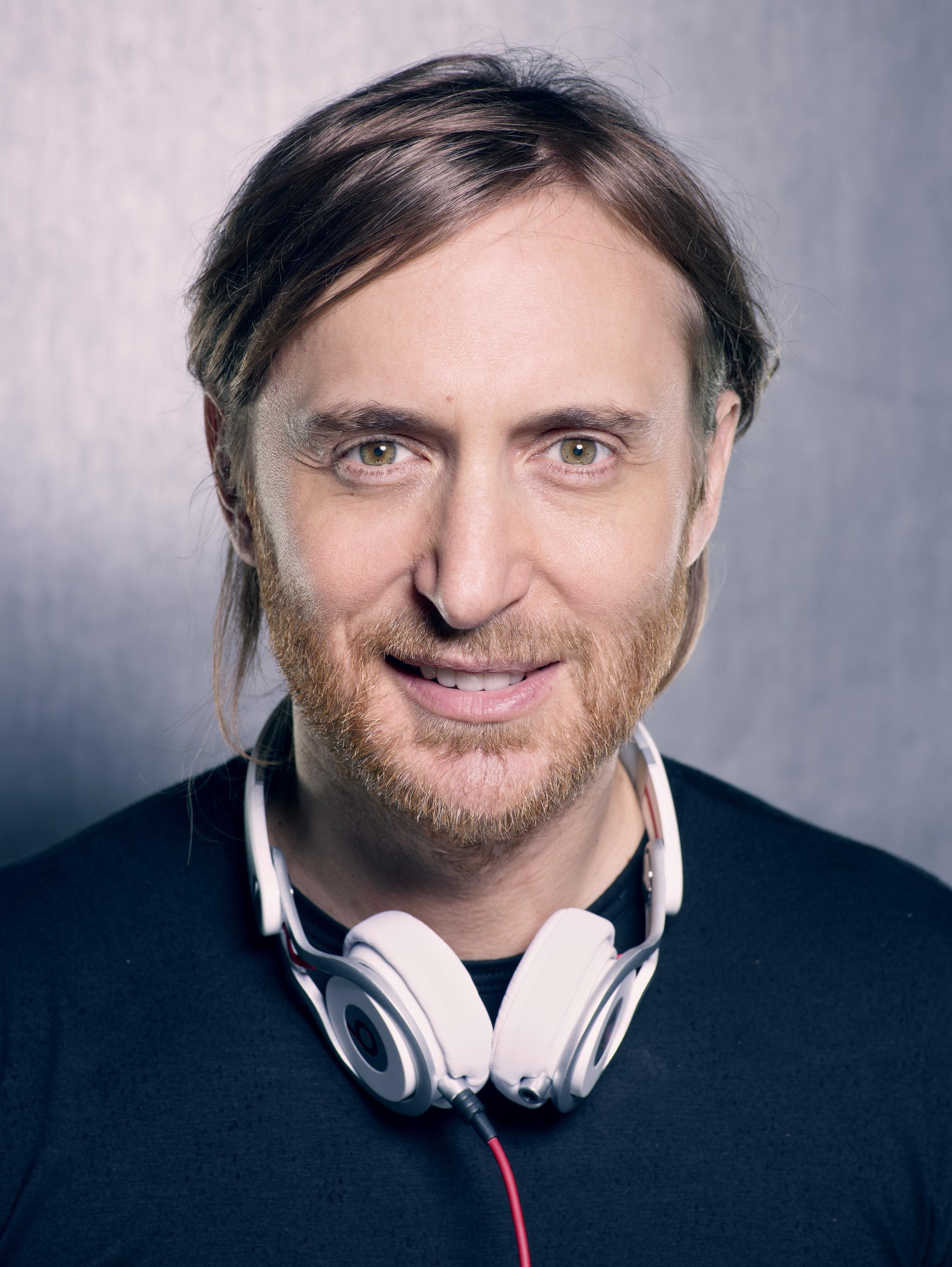
David Guetta and Rexha have collaborated on numerous occasions.

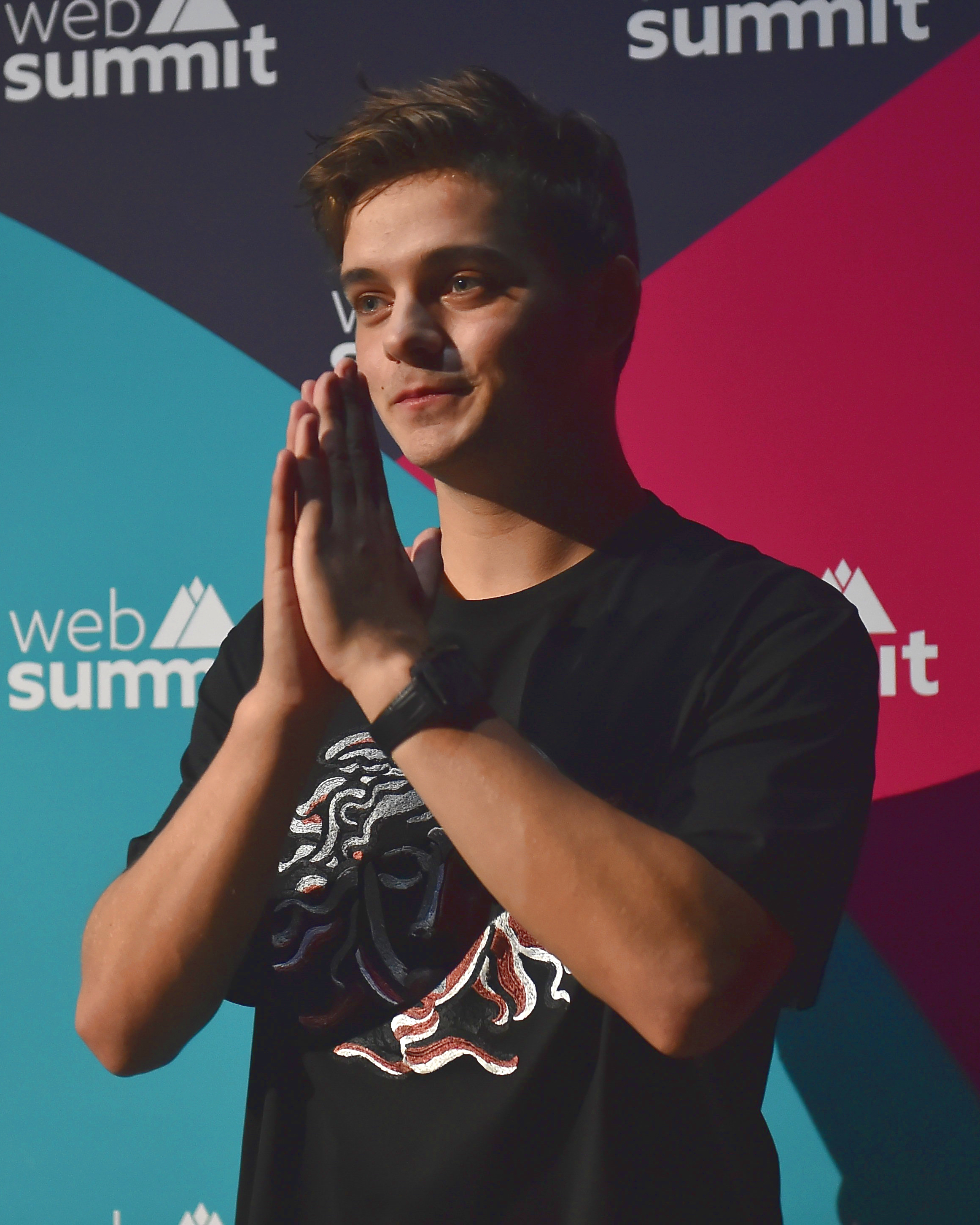
Martin Garrix and Rexha collaborated on "In the Name of Love".

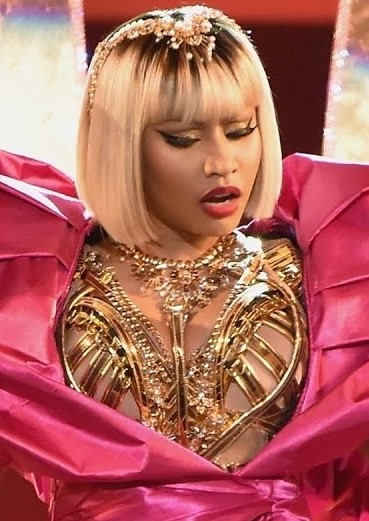
Nicki Minaj features on "No Broken Hearts" and had previously collaborated with Rexha on "Hey Mama".

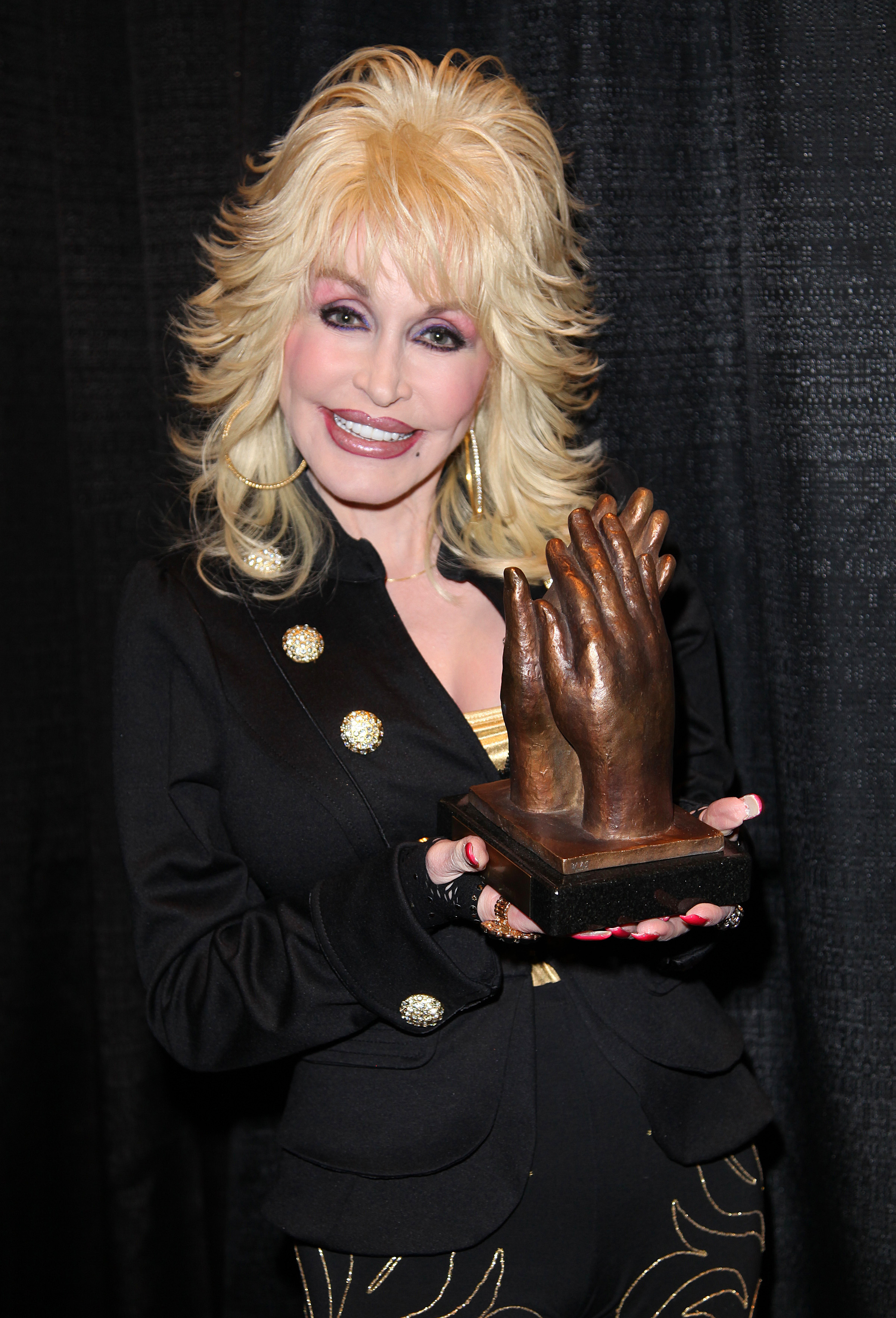
Dolly Parton and Rexha collaborated on "Seasons".

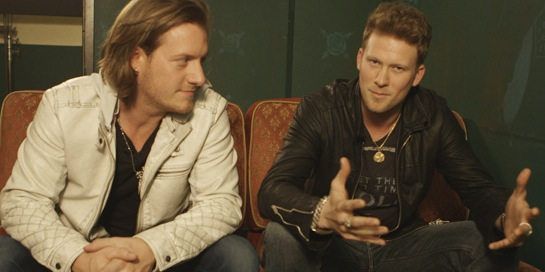
Florida Georgia Line feature on "Meant to Be".

Name of song, featured performers, writer(s), original release, and year of release
Song	Artist(s)	Writer(s)	Original release	Year	Ref.
"2 Souls on Fire"	Bebe Rexha featuring Quavo	Bleta Rexha (Note: Bleta Rexha is Rexha's real name.); Quavious Marshall; Lauren Christy; Jussi Karvinen; Aaron Zuckerman	Expectations	2018	
"All the Way"	Reykon featuring Bebe Rexha	Sebastian Sanchez; Alejandra Robledo; Andrés Felipe Robledo	Non-album single	2015	
"American Citizen"	Bebe Rexha	Michael Smith; Scott Krippayne	Non-album single	2021	
"Amore"	Bebe Rexha featuring Rick Ross	Bleta Rexha; Michael Pollack; William Roberts; Nate Cyphert; Alex Schwartz; Joe Khajadourian; Harry Warren; Jack Brooks	Better Mistakes	2021	
"Atmosphere"	Bebe Rexha	Bleta Rexha; Koko LaRoo; Marco Borrero; Trey Campbell	All Your Fault: Pt. 1	2017	
"Baby, I'm Jealous"	Bebe Rexha featuring Doja Cat	Bleta Rexha; Amala Dlamini; Pablo Bowman; Justin Tranter; Jussi Karvinen; Jason Gill	Better Mistakes	2021	
"Back to You"	Louis Tomlinson featuring Bebe Rexha and Digital Farm Animals	Louis Tomlinson; Nicholas Gale; Pablo Bowman; Richard Boardman; Sarah Blanchard	Non-album single	2017	
"Bad Bitch"	Bebe Rexha featuring Ty Dolla Sign	Bleta Rexha; Lauren Christy; Stargate; Ty Dolla Sign	All Your Fault: Pt. 1	2017	
"Battle Cry"	Havana Brown, featuring Bebe Rexha and Savi	Bleta Rexha; Angelique Meunier; Jonathan Keyes; Samuel Smith	Non-album single	2015	
"Beautiful Life"	Bebe Rexha	Bleta Rexha; Samuel Zammarelli; Christopher Tempest; David Saint Fleur; Nicholas Black	Abominable: Original Motion Picture Soundtrack	2019	
"Better Mistakes"	Bebe Rexha	Bleta Rexha; Justin Tranter; Lisa Scinta; Peter Rycroft; Richard Boardman; Pablo Bowman	Better Mistakes	2021	
"Blue Moon"	Bebe Rexha	Bleta Rexha; Kunfetti; Sam DeRosa; Joe Janiak	Bebe	2023	
"Born Again"	Bebe Rexha	Bleta Rexha; Michelle Buzz; Alex Bilowitz; Jussi Karvinen; Nick Monson	Bebe	2023	
"Break My Heart Myself"	Bebe Rexha featuring Travis Barker	Bleta Rexha; Justin Tranter; Jussi Karvinen; Travis Barker	Better Mistakes	2021	
"Call on Me"	Bebe Rexha	Bleta Rexha; Janée Bennett; Dave Gibson; Matthew Burns	Bebe	2023	
"Call You Mine"	The Chainsmokers featuring Bebe Rexha	Andrew Taggart; Alex Pall; Tony Ann; Andrew Wotman; Alexandra Tamposi; Steve McCutcheon; Norman Whitfield	World War Joy	2019	
"Chain My Heart"	Topic and Bebe Rexha	Bleta Rexha; Alexander Tidebrink; Tobias Topic; Petter Tarland	Non-album single	2021	
"Comfortable"	Bebe Rexha featuring Kranium	Bleta Rexha; Andrew Wotman; Ali Tamposi; Kranium	All Your Fault: Pt. 2	2017	
"Count on Christmas"	Bebe Rexha	Benj Pasek; Justin Paul	A Christmas Story Live!	2017	
"Dare You"	Hardwell featuring Matthew Koma and Bebe Rexha	Robbert van de Corput; Matthew Bair	United We Are	2015	
"Death Row"	Bebe Rexha	Bleta Rexha; Justin Tranter; Richard Boardman; Pablo Bowman	Better Mistakes	2021	
"Die for a Man"	Bebe Rexha featuring Lil Uzi Vert	Bleta Rexha; Symere Woods; Michelle Buzz; Nick Mira; Jason Gill	Better Mistakes	2021	
"Don't Get Any Closer"	Bebe Rexha	Bleta Rexha; Emily Warren; Scott Harris; Jussi Karvinen	Expectations	2018	
"Empty"	Bebe Rexha	Bleta Rexha; Justin Tranter; Jussi Karvinen; Richard Boardman; Pablo Bowman	Better Mistakes	2021	
"F.F.F."	Bebe Rexha featuring G-Eazy	Bleta Rexha; Ben Berger; Lauren Christy; G-Eazy; Ryan McMahon	All Your Fault: Pt. 1	2017	
"Family"	David Guetta featuring Bebe Rexha, A Boogie wit da Hoodie and Ty Dolla Sign	Ben Johnson; Ralph Wegner; A Boogie wit da Hoodie; Billy Mann; David Guetta; Jenna Johnson; KK Johnson; Ty Dolla Sign	Non-album single	2021	
"Ferrari"	Bebe Rexha	Bleta Rexha; Jason Evigan; Asia Whiteacre	Expectations	2018	
"Gateway Drug"	Bebe Rexha	Bleta Rexha; Lauren Christy; The Invisible Men; Salt Wives	All Your Fault: Pt. 1	2017	
"Girl in the Mirror"	Bebe Rexha	Neil Ormandy; Ingrid Andress; Jonas Jeberg	UglyDolls: Original Motion Picture Soundtrack	2019	
"Girls"	Rita Ora featuring Cardi B, Bebe Rexha and Charli XCX	Rita Ora; Belcalis Almanzar; Brian D. Lee; Ali Tamposi; Jordan Thorpe; Ben Diehl; Jonny Coffer; Andrew Wotman	Phoenix	2018	
"Gone"	Bebe Rexha	Bleta Rexha; Aaron Kleinstub; Bryan Fryzel; Maki Athanasiou	Non-album single	2014	
"Grace"	Bebe Rexha	Bleta Rexha; Lauren Christy; Andrew Wells	Expectations	2018	
"Harder"	Jax Jones and Bebe Rexha	Bleta Rexha; Timucin Aluo; Camille Purcell; Steve McCutcheon	Snacks	2019	
"Heart Still Beating"	Bebe Rexha and Nathan Dawe	Bleta Rexha; Eliza Rose; Ella Henderson; John Nicholas Ealand Morgan; Maegan Cottone; Nathan Dawe; William Martin Lansley	Non-album single	2023	
"Heart Wants What It Wants"	Bebe Rexha	Bleta Rexha; Bonnie McKee; Sarah Solovay; Liana Banks; Jussi Karvinen; Ido Zmishlany; Ryan Williamson; Ray Goren	Bebe	2023	
"Hey Mama"	David Guetta featuring Nicki Minaj, Bebe Rexha and Afrojack	Bleta Rexha; Ester Dean; Sean Douglas; David Guetta; Giorgio Tuinfort; Onika Maraj; Nick van de Wall; Alan Lomax	Listen	2015	
"Home"	Machine Gun Kelly, X Ambassadors and Bebe Rexha	Colson Baker; Jacob Hawkes; Charlie Snyder; Robert Gillies; Sam Nelson Harris; David Pramik; David Phelps	Bright: The Album	2017	
"I Am"	Bebe Rexha	Bleta Rexha; Whitney Phillips; Maya K	Bebe	2023	
"I Can't Stop Drinking About You"	Bebe Rexha	Bleta Rexha; Stefan Johnson; Jordan Johnson; Marcus Lomax	I Don't Wanna Grow Up	2015	
"I Don't Wanna Grow Up"	Bebe Rexha	Bleta Rexha; Nolan Lambroza; Nasri Atweh	I Don't Wanna Grow Up	2015	
"I Got Time"	Bebe Rexha	Bleta Rexha; Theron Thomas	All Your Fault: Pt. 2	2017	
"I Got You"	Bebe Rexha	Bleta Rexha; Ben Berger; Ryan McMahon; Ryan Rabin; Lauren Christy; Jacob Kasher Hindlin	Expectations	2018	
"I'm a Mess"	Bebe Rexha	Bleta Rexha; Jussi Karvinen; Justin Tranter; Meredith Brooks; Shelly Peiken	Expectations	2018	
"I'm Gonna Show You Crazy"	Bebe Rexha	Bleta Rexha; Jon Levine; Lauren Christy	I Don't Wanna Grow Up	2015	
"I'm Good (Blue)"	David Guetta and Bebe Rexha	Bleta Rexha; Kamille; Phil Plested; David Guetta; Gianfranco Randone; Massimo Gabutti; Maurizio Lobina	Bebe	2023	
"I'm Not High, I'm in Love"	Bebe Rexha	Bleta Rexha; Sarah Solovay; Jesse St. John; Ido Zmishlany	Bebe	2023	
"I'm Not Pretty"	Jessia featuring Bebe Rexha	Bleta Rexha; Jessika Harling; Elijah Woods	Non-album single	2021	
"If Only I"	Loud Luxury and Two Friends featuring Bebe Rexha	Bleta Rexha; Andrew Fedyk; Eli Sones; Gregory Hein; Jordan Johnson; Joseph Depace; Matthew Halper; Michael Pollack; Nick Henriques; Nija Charles; Shaun Frank; Stefan Johnson	Non-album single	2023	
"In the Name of Love"	Martin Garrix and Bebe Rexha	Bleta Rexha; Ruth-Anne Cunningham; Ilsey Juber; Martijn Garitsen; Matthew Radosevich; Stephen Philibin; Yael Nahar	Non-album single	2016	
"Jingle Bells" (cover)	Alex & Sierra and Bebe Rexha	James Lord Pierpont	Welcome to Our Christmas Party	2015	
"Knees"	Bebe Rexha	Bleta Rexha; Lauren Christy; Josh Miller; David Garcia	Expectations	2018	
"Last Hurrah"	Bebe Rexha	Bleta Rexha; Lauren Christy; Nick Long; Andrew Wells	Non-album single	2019	
"Mama"	Bebe Rexha	Bleta Rexha; Justin Tranter; Jussi Karvinen; Brian Lee; Alexander Dexter-Jones; Freddie Mercury	Better Mistakes	2021	
"Me, Myself & I"	G-Eazy and Bebe Rexha	Gerald Gillum; Bleta Rexha; Lauren Christy; Thomas Barnes; Peter Kelleher; Ben Kohn; Michael Keenan; Christoph Andersson	When It's Dark Out	2015	
"Meant to Be"	Bebe Rexha featuring Florida Georgia Line	Bleta Rexha; Tyler Hubbard; Josh Miller; David Garcia	Expectations	2018	
"Mine"	Bebe Rexha	Bleta Rexha; Chauncey Hollis Jr. Lionchild; Rachel Kennedy; Lance Shipp; Nathalia Marshall	Expectations	2018	
"Miracle Man"	Bebe Rexha	Bleta Rexha; Bonnie McKee; Sarah Solovay; Jesse St. John; Ido Zmishlany	Bebe	2023	
"My Dear Love"	Bebe Rexha featuring Ty Dolla Sign	Bleta Rexha; Tyrone Griffin; Trevor Neill; Justin Tranter; Brian Lee; Andrew Bolooki	Better Mistakes	2021	
"No Broken Hearts"	Bebe Rexha featuring Nicki Minaj	Bleta Rexha; Onika Maraj; Jacob Kasher Hindlin; Koko LaRoo; Kgaugelo Nalane	Non-album single	2016	
"Not 20 Anymore"	Bebe Rexha	Bleta Rexha; Jordan K. Johnson; Michael Pollack; Oliver Peterhof; Stefan Johnson	Non-album single	2019	
"(Not) the One"	Bebe Rexha	Bleta Rexha; Jesper Borgen; Sara Hjellström; Jason Gill	All Your Fault: Pt. 2	2017	
"On the Go"	Bebe Rexha featuring Pink Sweats and Lunay	Bleta Rexha; David Bowden; Michael Keenan; Jefnier Osorio Moreno	Better Mistakes	2021	
"One in a Million"	Bebe Rexha and David Guetta	Bleta Rexha; Matthew Burns; Ido Zmishlany; Sarah Solovay; David Guetta; Martin Coogan; Scott Dittrich; Timofey Reznikov	Non-album single	2023	
"Pillow"	Bebe Rexha	Bleta Rexha; Asia Whiteacre; Jonathan Yip; Raymond Romulus; Jeremy Reeves; Raymound McCollough II	Expectations	2018	
"Pray"	Bebe Rexha	Bleta Rexha; Stefan Johnson; Jordan Johnson; Marcus Lomax; Alexander Izquierdo; Sam Watters	I Don't Wanna Grow Up	2015	
"Push Back"	Ne-Yo, Bebe Rexha and Stefflon Don	Bleta Rexha; Shaffer Smith; Mikkel Eriksen; Tor Hermansen; Stephanie Allen	Good Man	2018	
"Sabotage"	Bebe Rexha	Bleta Rexha; Michael Tighe; Jon Hume; Michael Matosic; Greg Kurstin	Better Mistakes	2021	
"Sacrifice"	Bebe Rexha	Bleta Rexha; Pablo Bowman; Peter Rycroft; Matthew Burns	Better Mistakes	2021	
"Sad"	Bebe Rexha	Bleta Rexha; Stefan Johnson; Jordan Johnson; Marcus Lomax; Asia Whiteacre; Oliver Peterhof	Expectations	2018	
"Satellite"	Bebe Rexha and Snoop Dogg	Bleta Rexha; Calvin Broadus; Maya K Kunfetti; Sam DeRosa; Joe Janiak	Bebe	2023	
"Say My Name"	David Guetta, Bebe Rexha and J Balvin	Giorgio Tuinfort; Boaz van de Beatz; José Balvin; Alejandro Ramirez; Thomas Troelsen; Emily Warren; Britt Burton; Philip Leigh; Matt Holmes	7	2018	
"Seasons"	Bebe Rexha and Dolly Parton	Bleta Rexha; Sarah Solovay; Ido Zmishlany	Bebe	2023	
"Self Control"	Bebe Rexha	Bleta Rexha; Lauren Christy; Andrew Wells	Expectations	2018	
"Shining Star"	Bebe Rexha	Bleta Rexha; Lauren Christy; Jacqetta Singleton; Scott Carter; Alexander Prawl; Dre Pinckney	Expectations	2018	
"Sink or Swim"	Pierce Fulton featuring Bebe Rexha	Bleta Rexha; Pierce Fulton	Non-album single	2012	
"Small Doses"	Bebe Rexha	Bleta Rexha; Lauren Christy; Gladius; Lindsey Stirling	All Your Fault: Pt. 1	2017	
"Stars"	Pnau, Bebe Rexha and Ozuna	Bleta Rexha; Nick Littlemore; Sam Littlemore; Peter Mayes; Juan Carlos Ozuna Rosado; Janée Bennett; Yazid Rivera	Non-album single	2023	
"Steady"	Bebe Rexha featuring Tory Lanez	Bleta Rexha; Daystar Peterson; Asia Whiteacre; Louis Bell	Expectations	2018	
"Sweet Beginnings"	Bebe Rexha	Bleta Rexha; Jason Evigan	I Don't Wanna Grow Up	2015	
"Take Me Home"	Cash Cash featuring Bebe Rexha	Bleta Rexha; Samuel Frisch; Alex Makhlouf; Jean Paul Makhlouf; Brandon Lowry	Blood, Sweat & 3 Years	2013	
"That's How You Know"	Nico & Vinz featuring Kid Ink and Bebe Rexha	Julia Michaels; Vincent Dery; Brian Collins; Nicolay Sereba	Cornerstone	2015	
"That's It"	Bebe Rexha featuring Gucci Mane and 2 Chainz	Bleta Rexha; Tauheed Epps; Radric Davis; Theron Thomas; Shane Lindstrom; Kevin Gomringer; Tim Gomringer	All Your Fault: Pt. 2	2017	
"This Is Not a Drill"	Pitbull featuring Bebe Rexha	Bleta Rexha; Jeremy Dussolliet; Tim Sommers; Armando C. Pérez	Globalization	2014	
"Trust Fall"	Bebe Rexha	Bleta Rexha; Madison Love; Sorana Păcurar; Blake Slatkin	Better Mistakes	2021	
"Visions (Don't Go)"	Bebe Rexha	Bleta Rexha; Sean Douglas; Casey Smith; Tom Barnes; Ben Kohn; Pete Kelleher	Bebe	2023	
"The Way I Are (Dance with Somebody)"	Bebe Rexha featuring Lil Wayne	Bleta Rexha; Dwayne Carter; Clarence Coffee Jr. Jacob Kasher Hindlin; Joel Little; Jonas Jeberg; Shannon Rubicam; George Merrill	All Your Fault: Pt. 2	2017	
"When It Rains"	Bebe Rexha	Bleta Rexha; Cleo Tighe; Chloe George; Jussi Karvinen	Bebe	2023	
"Yesterday"	David Guetta featuring Bebe Rexha	Bleta Rexha; Giorgio Tuinfort; David Guetta; Sean Douglas; Tim Bergling	Listen	2015	
"You Can't Stop the Girl"	Bebe Rexha	Bleta Rexha; Aaron Huffman; Evan Sult; Jeff Lin; Michael Pollack; Nate Cyphert; Sean Nelson; Alex Schwartz; Joe Khajadourian	Maleficent: Mistress of Evil (Original Motion Picture Soundtrack)	2019	
