= Only Love (Shaggy song) =

2015 song by Shaggy

Single by Shaggy featuring Pitbull and Gene Noble
- Released: 15 August 2015
- Recorded: 2015
- Genre: Dance-pop; Eurodance
- Length: 4:30
- Label: RED; Sony Music Entertainment
- Songwriters: Orville Burrell; Andre Fennell; Oana Radu; Costi Ioniță; Armando Pérez; Jaiden Roston; Dimitri Silviu Aurelian; Dee Sonoram
- Producer: Costi Ioniță

Shaggy singles chronology
"I Need Your Love" (2014)	"Only Love" (2015)	"Don't You Need Somebody" (2016)

Pitbull single singles chronology
"Shake That" (2015)	"Only Love" (2015)	"Drive You Crazy" (2015)

Music video
- "Only Love" (audio) on YouTube

"Only Love" is a song recorded by Jamaican-American reggae artist Shaggy and American artists, rapper Pitbull and R&B singer Gene Noble. It was released on 15 August 2015 through RED Associated Labels, a division of Sony Music Entertainment.

== Background ==
The song is described as a 'high-energy dance single' with Shaggy and Pitbull providing uplifting flow verses and Gene Noble providing the chorus. The concept of the song is to 'show how powerful love is'. Shaggy said he was inspired to write the song that brings happiness to people.

== Music video ==
On 22 January 2016, Shaggy released the official music video for the song. The video version does not feature Pitbull in both the song and the music video. The music video was directed by Parris. It features Shaggy and Gene Noble performing on an open grassland.

== Track listing ==
Digital download – Singles
No.	Title	Length
1.	"Only Love" (featuring Pitbull & Gene Noble)	4:30
2.	"Only Love" (featuring Pitbull & Gene Noble) (Suyano Remix)	3:49
3.	"Only Love" (featuring Pitbull & Gene Noble) (Mastiksoul Remix)	3:12
4.	"Only Love" (featuring Pitbull & Gene Noble) (Luca Schreiner Island House Mix)	3:26

Digital download – Only Love (The Remixes) – EP
No.	Title	Length
1.	"Only Love" (featuring Pitbull & Gene Noble) (Luca Schreiner Tropical House Chelsea Mix)	3:52
2.	"Only Love" (featuring Pitbull & Gene Noble) (Mike Humphrey Remix)	4:30
3.	"Only Love" (featuring Pitbull & Gene Noble) (Bad Royale Remix)	3:48

== Charts ==
Chart	Peak position
Belgium (Ultratop 50 Wallonia)	36
US Dance/Electronic Digital Songs	20
