= Satellite (Bebe Rexha and Snoop Dogg song) =

2023 single by Bebe Rexha and Snoop Dogg

Single by Bebe Rexha and Snoop Dogg

from the album Bebe
- Released: April 19, 2023
- Genre: Disco; pop
- Length: 3:28
- Label: Warner
- Songwriters: Bebe Rexha; Snoop Dogg; Sam DeRosa; Joe Janiak; Kunfetti; Maya Kurchner
- Producer: Joe Janiak

Bebe Rexha singles chronology
"Call on Me" (2023)	"Satellite" (2023)	"Stars" (2023)

Snoop Dogg singles chronology
"Bad Decisions" (2022)	"Satellite" (2023)	"Gorgeous" (2024)

Music video
- "Satellite" on YouTube

"Satellite" is a song by American singer-songwriter Bebe Rexha and American rapper Snoop Dogg from her third studio album, Bebe (2023). It was written by the artists along with Sam DeRosa, Joe Janiak, Kunfetti and Maya Kurchner, with the production by Janiak. The song was released as the third single from the album for digital download and streaming by Warner in various countries on April 19, 2023. A 1970s-inspired love song celebrating the 4/20 culture, it is a disco and pop song with funk and dance-pop elements, telling the story of a moment of getting high and being sent to an alternate universe. Upon release, "Satellite" earned acclaim from music critics for its music, lyrics and the artists collaboration. The song reached the top 40 in Croatia, Hungary, Poland and Romania. The animated music video, with references to cartoons from the 1960s and 1970s by Hanna-Barbera and Warner, premiered on Rexha's YouTube channel on April 20.

== Background and composition ==
On February 8, 2023, Rexha announced her third studio album Bebe (2023) and the forthcoming release of "Satellite" in collaboration with American rapper Snoop Dogg at a listening event in Los Angeles. Ahead of its debut, the singer teased the song by posting its cover art and a video, showcasing a moment between the artists smoking together, on her social media channels. Characterising the collaboration as a "dream", she elaborated that it commenced with her sending the song to the rapper through Instagram. Following his prompt response and integration of his verse, she conveyed her enthusiasm for the resulting positive outcome. Ultimately on April 19, Warner released "Satellite" for digital download and streaming as the second single from the album. Joe Janiak produced the song and wrote it along with Rexha, Snoop Dogg, Sam DeRosa, Kunfetti and Maya Kurchner. A 1970s-inspired love song, it blends disco and pop music with funk and dance-pop elements. Celebrating the 4/20 culture, the song tells the story of a moment of getting high and being sent to an alternate universe. Lyrically, it portrays Rexha's sensation of soaring through the sky like a satellite to the Milky Way, with Snoop Dogg sharing his own perspectives.

== Reception ==
Following its release, "Satellite" earned acclaim from music critics. Jordi Bardají from Jenesaispop applauded the song's diverse influences across pop history, citing nods to Chic, Daft Punk, Gloria Gaynor, and a polished finish reminiscent of Dua Lipa's second studio album Future Nostalgia (2020). Bardají also underscored the appeal of the "glorious" chorus beyond the summer and commended Snoop Dogg's rap. Joe Lynch of Billboard marked the song as a "buoyant" song, where Snoop Dogg demonstrates remarkable agility, possibly attributed to Rexha's "effortless aplomb" in infusing a party-ready atmosphere. Kyann-Sian Williams for NME labeled the song as a "4/20-friendly stoner anthem". While reviewing Bebe, Neil Z. Yeung of AllMusic hailed the song as an "irresistible jam", identifying it as an "effervescent" homage to cannabis, marked by sparkling strings akin to Swedish group ABBA. Jeffrey Davies from PopMatters emphasised Snoop Dogg's appearance as a refreshing standout, notably in contrast to the perceived fatigue in guest vocals from American singer Ty Dolla Sign on Rexha's preceding album Better Mistakes (2021). Gary Gerard Hamilton for Associated Press highlighted the collaborative effort, while distinguishing the song as the "only other feature for the fun" on the album. Ryan Bulbeck of Renowned for Sound described it as a "sweet and heady" anthem, encapsulating the euphoria of getting high, with Snoop Dogg's intro completing the overall "throw-back feel". Commercially, "Satellite" reached number 19 in Romania, number 20 in Poland, number 25 in Croatia, number 38 in Hungary and number 162 in the Commonwealth of Independent States (CIS).

== Music video and promotion ==
Sequence from the music video of "Satellite", presenting the animated representation of Rexha delivering a concert to aliens with an appearance reminiscent of marijuana buds.

An animated music video for "Satellite" was published on Rexha's official YouTube channel on April 20, 2023. Inspired by classic cartoons produced by American companies Hanna-Barbera and Warner in the 1960s and 1970s, the animation draws from works such as Duck Dodgers in the 24½th Century (1953), The Jetsons (1962) and Josie and the Pussycats (1963). Additionally, Star Trek (1966) contributed to specific details, encompassing outfit design, ship interconnections and the teleportation effects. Directed by Juan M. Urbin of Venturia Animation, the creation process spanned over a month from its commencement. Employing a variety of tools, the creative process involved pen and paper for concept drawings, as well as the utilisation of software applications such as Adobe Photoshop for background creation and Toon Boom for animating sequences.

The video opens with a conversation between Rexha and Snoop Dogg in a "groovy" described indoor setting. Responding to her desire to venture into outer space within the "Bebeverse", the rapper guides the singer into an animated cannabis leaf-shaped space ship operated by buds of marijuana. He then delivers the directive, "Screw your wig on tight, put your seat belt on, and get ready for the ride of your life, 'cause I'm gonna take you to a whole 'nother dimension." From the moment Snoop Dogg exhales a cloud of smoke, the video undergoes a transformative animation of the entire video. With the onset of the music, Rexha adopts a visual style reminiscent of The Jetsons, lying on a couch with a dog by her side engaging in smoking. Subsequently, the video transitions to depict the singer piloting a spaceship through space, arriving at a space station where she encounters Snoop Dogg, joining him on her journey. Following this, it showcases Rexha performing in a concert for aliens, characterised by their unique resemblance to piles of sticky icky. The video ends with her being transported back to her initial setting, lounging on a couch.

On May 1, Rexha premiered "Satellite" for the first time on the American talk show Jimmy Kimmel Live!, performing in a glittering green cannabis leaf-shaped costume. Furthermore, the release of the song was accompanied by a remix from German disc jockey Alle Farben published on July 7.

== Track listing ==
- Digital download and streaming
1. "Satellite" – 3:28
- Digital download and streaming – Remixes
1. "Satellite" (Alle Farben Remix) – 3:24

== Charts ==
Weekly chart performance
Chart (2023)	Peak position
CIS Airplay (TopHit)	162
Croatia (HRT)	25
Hungary (Single Top 40)	38
Lithuania Airplay (TopHit)	7
Poland (Polish Airplay Top 100)	20
Romania Airplay (Media Forest)	9

== Release history ==
Release dates and formats
Region	Date	Format(s)	Label	Ref.
Various	April 19, 2023	Digital download; streaming	Warner	
United Kingdom	April 19, 2023	Digital download; streaming	Warner	
Italy	May 8, 2023	Radio airplay	Warner	
