= Faydee =

Australian singer

Faydee فادي فتروني
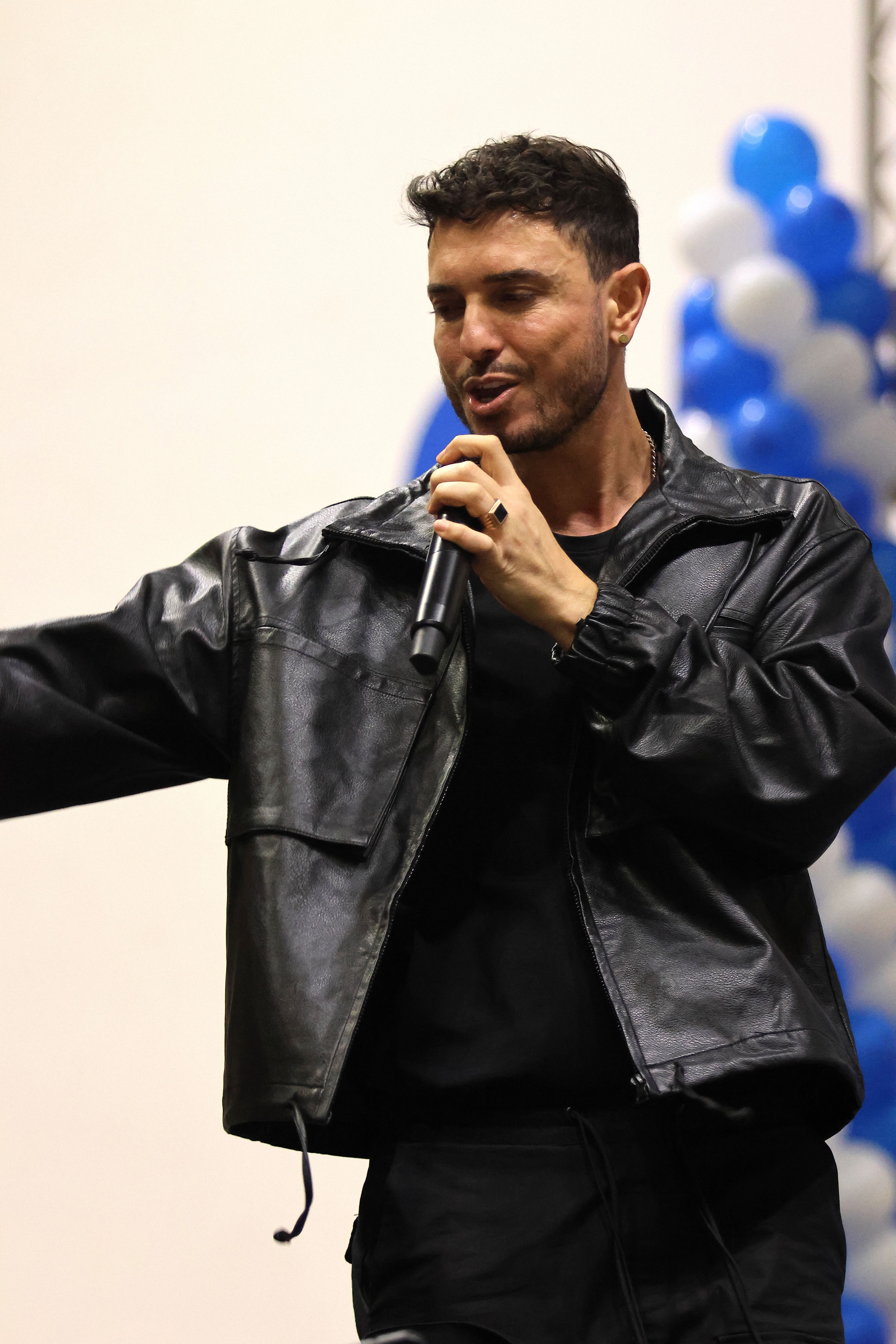
- Faydee in 2022

Background information
- Born: Fady Fatrouni; 2 February 1987 (age 39); Sydney, Australia
- Genres: Pop, dance
- Occupation: Singer
- Years active: 2008–present
- Labels: Buckle Up, Winfinity
- Website: faydee.com

Fady Fatrouni (Arabic: فادي فتروني; born 2 February 1987), best known by his stage name Faydee, is an Australian singer. He is best known for his 2013 single "Can't Let Go", as well his international hit "Habibi (I Need Your Love)" credited to Shaggy, Mohombi, Faydee and Costi.

== Early life and education ==
Faydee was born into a Muslim family on 2 February 1987 in Sydney, Australia. His parents originated from Tripoli, Lebanon. Faydee is the oldest of five children, with two sisters and two brothers. Faydee's interest in music began through his cousins, who would record beats and rap and sing over them for entertainment. At the age of thirteen, he began writing and recording music from his bedroom.

== Career ==
Faydee was discovered online at the age of 19 by Ronnie Diamond, owner / founder of record label Buckle Up Entertainment. After signing with Buckle Up, Faydee wrote several songs and, in the process, honed his writing, production and recording techniques. In 2008, Faydee partnered with producer Divy Pota to develop his sound and sonically trademark his style. The pair had a string of increasingly successful releases including "I Should've Known", "Never Saw Me Coming", "Psycho", "Say My Name" and "Forget the World". The positive response to these releases landed Faydee at the forefront of the Australian music industry within a short time of entering the market. Meanwhile, Faydee used the power of the internet to reach an international audience, and while progressing in the Australian market, was also able to develop a grassroots following all around the world.

In 2013, Faydee released R&B crossover hit "Laugh Till You Cry", primarily as a way to reach members of his audience who identified with urban music, in a time when dance/EDM was dominating the charts. "Laugh Till You Cry" was produced by Divy Pota and features fellow Australian artist Lazy J. The song became a pan-European and international hit for Faydee, and went on to hold the No. 1 position on the Romania Hot 100 Airplay Charts for 6 consecutive weeks. "Laugh Till You Cry" was followed up by a series of similarly successful releases, including "Can't Let Go" and "Maria", which both earned significant airplay on commercial radio in several international territories. "Can't Let Go" has received over 202 million views on YouTube to date.

In 2014, Faydee released the bilingual English/Arabic song "Habibi (I Need Your Love)", which would go on to become a major turning point in his career, earning him accolades such as his first appearance on the Billboard Hot 100 chart, as well as a BMI Award for his writing on the record. "I Need Your Love" was a collaboration with Shaggy, Mohombi, and Costi Ionita. Faydee wrote the song and co-produced the track with Ionita, and Faydee's vocals appear in the chorus, first verse, and as the main hook throughout the song. "I Need Your Love" took the world by storm and was a hit on commercial radio as well as sales charts in several major music markets. The song peaked at No. 66 on the US Billboard Hot 100 chart, No. 20 on Billboard US Mainstream Top 40, No. 27 on Billboard US Rhythmic, No. 36 UK Singles Chart. In 2016, "I Need Your Love" was certified Gold in the US by RIAA, recognising sales in excess of 500,000.

After "I Need Your Love", Faydee released "Lullaby", which was a commercial success, peaking at No. 9 on the Romania Radio Charts, and also appearing in the top 10 iTunes charts in several territories including Romania, Cyprus and Moldova. Also in late 2015, Faydee released his single "Sun Don't Shine", which marked his return to collaboration with producer Divy Pota. It peaked at No. 1 on the iTunes chart in Bulgaria and Azerbaijan, as well as appearing in the top 10 iTunes chart of several other territories. The song became a hit in Poland, peaking at No. 19 on the Top Shazam chart there, while receiving a total of 120,000 Shazams overall.

2016 was another growth year for Faydee. In March 2016, Faydee released the EP Legendary, a five-song collaboration with Divy Pota. It included the title single "Legendary", fan favourites "Amari", "If I Didn't Love You", "Ya Linda" and "Jealous". The EP was well received by industry and audience alike. 2016 also saw him release a number of successful records, including "Love in Dubai" with DJ Sava, "Nobody" with Kat Deluna and Leftside, "Believe" with German rapper Kay One. These releases were backed up by a vigorous touring schedule, and overall in 2016 Faydee saw his YouTube subscribers exceed 500,000, his Facebook likes exceed 600,000, and his Shazam followers surpass the 2 million mark.

"Love in Dubai", with DJ Sava, quickly became a summer party anthem in Europe and the Middle East, peaking at No. 1 on the Top 40 chart in Bulgaria, top 10 on Shazam in UAE and top 5 on Shazam in Dubai. In August 2016, Faydee released "Believe", a collaboration with German Kay One. A music video was released featuring both performers. "Believe" reached the iTunes top 40 chart in Germany and Austria.

"Nobody" was released in September 2016 along with a music video featuring internationally renowned artists Kat DeLuna and Leftside. The song peaked at No. 14 in Germany on the Deutsche DJ Charts and in the top 40 on iTunes in Portugal and Israel, as well as in top 40 on Shazam in Australia. The song also earned radio play in a number of commercial territories around the world.

== Achievements ==
On 12 September 2015, Faydee received Best European Artist Award during Big Apple Music Awards, in Hamburg, Germany. End of 2016, BMI announced Faydee as winner for his song "Habibi (I Need Your Love)" and on 10 October 2016, he received the achievement award in recognition of the great national popularity as measured by broadcast performances event presented by BMI in London. And on 27 November 2016, he received from Big Apple Music Awards 2016 in New York, the Best Australian Act 2016 Award also performing for the first time in New York.

== Discography ==
=== Albums ===
- 2009: Never Saw Me Coming

=== EPs ===
- 2013: Unbreakable EP
- 2016: Legendary EP
- 2017: Patterns EP
- 2022: Cruel EP

=== Remixes ===
- 2015: Who (Remixes) EP (with Claydee)
- 2016: Maria (Remixes) EP (with One Direction)

=== Singles ===
Year	Single	Peak positions										
Year	Single	AUT	BUL	FR	GER	NED	ROM	UK	US	US Dance/Mix Show Airplay	US Mainstream Top 40	US Rhythmic
2013	"Can't Let Go"	–	4	–	–	–	–	–	–	–	–	–
2014	"I Need Your Love" (credited to Shaggy feat. Mohombi, Faydee, Costi	75	–	147	91	10	–	36	66	16	20	27
2014	"Who" (with Claydee)	–	27	–	–	–	–	–	–	–	–	–
2014	"Sun Don't Shine"	–	37	–	–	–	–	–	–	–	–	–
2016	"Love in Dubai" (with DJ Sava)	–	14	–	–	–	–	–	–	–	–	–
2017	"Nobody" (feat. Kat Deluna and Leftside)	–	40	–	–	–	–	–	–	–	–	–
2018	"Crazy"	–	–	–	–	–	23	–	–	–	–	–

=== Videography ===
- 2008: "Never Ever"
- 2010: "Shelter Your Heart"
- 2010: "I Should've Known" (feat. Manny Boy)
- 2011: "Never Saw Me Coming"
- 2011: "Fallin' (Ya Gamil)" (produced by Divy Pota)
- 2011: "Say My Name'
- 2011: "Psycho"
- 2012: "Forget the World (FML)"
- 2012: "Laugh Till You Cry" (feat. Lazy J)
- 2013: "Unbreakable" (feat. Miracle)
- 2013: "Catch Me"
- 2013: "Can't Let Go"
- 2014: "You Deserve Better"
- 2014: "Beautiful Girl" (with Costi)
- 2014: "Far Away"
- 2014: "Maria"
- 2014: "Habibi (I Need Your Love)"
- 2014: "In the Dark"
- 2015: "Who" (with Claydee)
- 2015: "Move On (C'est La Vie)"
- 2015: "Lullaby"
- 2015: "Sun Don't Shine"
- 2016: "Legendary"
- 2016: "Amari"
- 2016: "Ya Linda"
- 2016: "Burn It Down" (with Ahzee)
- 2016: "Nobody" (feat. Kat DeLuna & Leftside)
- 2017: "What Is Love?"
- 2017: "Right Here"
- 2017: "More"
- 2017: "Friendzone" (feat. Demarco)
- 2017: "When I'm Gone" (feat. Bess & Gon Haziri)
- 2017: "Toy" (feat. WSTRN)
- 2018: "Crazy"
- 2018: "Habibi Albi" (feat. Leftside)
- 2018: "Bang Bang"
- 2019: "Away"
- 2019: "Gravity" (feat. Hande Yener & Rebel Groove)
- 2019: "Enchanté" (feat. Alina Eremia & Raluka)
- 2019: "Habibi Albi (Remix)" (feat. Shahzoda)
- 2019: "Salam"
- 2019: "Trika Trika" (feat. Antonia)
- 2020: "Leila ليلى (Roxanne Arab Remix)"
- 2020: "Idwk (I Don't Wanna Know)" (feat. Gon Haziri)
- 2020: "Aywa" (feat. Valderrama)
- 2020: "Ye Ye" (Faydee x Tm Bax x Pav Dharia)
- 2020: "Hala"
- 2020: "What You Know Bout Love (Pop Smoke Arab Remix)"
- 2020: "Stubborn"
- 2020: "Luv U No More"
- 2021: "In Your Arms Tonight" (feat. Gon Haziri)
- 2021: "Lost In These Streets"
- 2021: "Zamaan"
- 2021: "The business" (feat. Blackjack)
- 2021: "Stay With Me"
- 2022: "Repeat"
- 2022: "Luana" (feat. Costi)
- 2023: "Balaaki"

=== Featured on ===
- 2011: "Getaway" (Manny Boy feat. Faydee)
- 2014: "Dangerous" (Moody feat. Faydee)
- 2014: "Mad in Love" (Lazy J feat. Faydee)
- 2015: "Luv You Better" (Manny feat. Faydee)
- 2015: "Live Forever" (DJ James Yammouni feat. Faydee)
- 2016: "Love in Dubai" (DJ Sava feat. Faydee)
- 2016: "Believe" (Kay One feat. Faydee)
- 2017: "On My Way" (James Yammouni and Faydee feat. Adam Saleh)
- 2017: "Waynak" (Adam Saleh & Faydee)
- 2017: "Right There" (Adam Saleh & Faydee feat. Silentó)
- 2018: "Yullah" (Ahzee feat. Faydee)
- 2018: "Belly Dancer" (DJ Moh Green feat. Faydee & Young Zerka)
- 2018: "Don't Know Why" (Ayo Jay feat. Faydee & James Yammouni)
- 2019: "Stay" (Spyne feat. Faydee)
- 2019: "Yalla Habibi" (Luana Vjollca & Faydee)
- 2019: "Better Days" (Arman Cekin feat. Faydee & Karra)
- 2020: "Layla" (Topo La Maskara feat. Faydee & Mr. Vegas)
- 2021: "Ro7i" (Mudi feat. Faydee)
- 2022: "Criminal" (Karl Wine feat. Faydee, Monq & Kilate Tesla)
- 2022: "Body Language" (RANDI feat. Faydee)
- 2022: "Call Me Habibi" (Isadora feat. Faydee)
- 2022: "Gimme More" (F1rstman feat. Arjun & Faydee)
- 2022: "Don't Hang Up" (Open Till L8 feat. Faydee)
- 2022: "Without You" (Arman Cekin feat. Faydee)
- 2022: "Monalisa" (Costi feat. Faydee & Marra)
- 2022: "Jamila" (Simon Blaze feat. Faydee)
