= Fun (Pitbull song) =

Single by Pitbull featuring Chris Brown

from the album Globalization
- Released: April 21, 2015
- Recorded: 2014
- Length: 3:22
- Label: Mr. 305; Polo Grounds; RCA
- Songwriters: Armando C. Pérez; Jason Evigan; Clarence Coffee, Jr.; Marcus Lomax; Jordan Johnson; Stefan Johnson; Alexander Izquierdo; Christopher Brown; Al Burna
- Producers: The Monsters and the Strangerz; Jason Evigan

Pitbull singles chronology
"Mr. Put It Down" (2015)	"Fun" (2015)	"Back It Up" (2015)

Chris Brown singles chronology
"Fool Wit It" (2015)	"Fun" (2015)	"Do It Again" (2015)

"Fun" is a song by American rapper Pitbull, featuring American singer Chris Brown. The song was released on April 21, 2015 as the fourth single off of Pitbull's eighth studio album Globalization. The song peaked at number 40 on the Billboard Hot 100.

== Music video ==
A colourful music video inspired with the influences from Miami Vice and GTA Vice City was released on June 19, 2015. It features Pitbull and Brown. It was directed by Gil Green. Nuestra Belleza Latina 2013 winner Marisela de Montecristo made a cameo appearance in the video.

HollywoodLife's Christopher Rogers called the video "amazing" and "masterpiece", and also added that it has everything the audience would want in a music video released in the summer. Zach Frydenlund of Complex gave a negative review, saying the video "doesn't actually look fun at all".

== Live performances ==
Pitbull and Chris Brown performed the song on the finale of the singing competition series American Idol on May 13, 2015. That season's American Idol eighth-place finisher Qaasim Middleton also joined them on the stage for the final verse.

On May 17, Pitbull and Brown performed "Fun" at the 2015 Billboard Music Awards.

On May 20, Pitbull performed "Fun" and "Time of Our Lives" on The Tonight Show Starring Jimmy Fallon.

== Chart performance ==
The single debuted at number 77 on the US Billboard Hot 100 chart, on the week of May 30, 2015. After climbing the chart for six more weeks, the single reached its peak at number 40 on the chart.

== Charts ==
=== Weekly charts ===
Weekly chart performance for "Fun"
Chart (2015)	Peak position
Australia (ARIA)	59
Austria (Ö3 Austria Top 40)	44
Belgium (Ultratop 50 Flanders)	50
Belgium (Ultratip Bubbling Under Wallonia)	3
Canada Hot 100 (Billboard)	24
Canada CHR/Top 40 (Billboard)	22
France (SNEP)	57
Germany (GfK)	36
Hungary (Dance Top 40)	36
Hungary (Rádiós Top 40)	24
Hungary (Single Top 40)	14
Hungary (Stream Top 40)	23
Ireland (IRMA)	59
Italy (FIMI)	94
Netherlands (Dutch Top 40)	9
Netherlands (Single Top 100)	16
Scottish Singles Sales (Official Charts)	68
Slovenia (SloTop50)	41
Spain (Promusicae)	78
Sri Lanka	25
Switzerland (Schweizer Hitparade)	50
UK Singles (Official Charts)	68
UK Hip Hop/R&B (Official Charts)	14
US Billboard Hot 100	40
US Hot Rap Songs (Billboard)	7
US Dance Airplay (Billboard)	14
US Dance Club Songs (Billboard)	30
US Latin Pop Airplay (Billboard)	33
US Pop Airplay (Billboard)	17
US Rhythmic Airplay (Billboard)	15

=== Year-end charts ===
Annual chart rankings for "Fun"
Chart (2015)	Position
Canada (Canadian Hot 100)	86
Hungary (Single Top 40)	77
Netherlands (Dutch Top 40)	52
Netherlands (Single Top 100)	80
US Rap Songs (Billboard)	30

== Certifications ==
Region	Certification	Certified units/sales
Australia (ARIA)	Gold	35,000^{‡}
Mexico (AMPROFON)	Gold	30,000^{‡}
New Zealand (RMNZ)	Gold	15,000^{‡}
United States (RIAA)	Platinum	1,000,000^{‡}
^{‡} Sales+streaming figures based on certification alone.

== Release history ==
Country	Date	Format	Label
Australia	June 23, 2015	CD; digital download	Mr. 305; Polo Grounds; RCA
