= The Janoskians =

Australian entertainers (2011–2018)

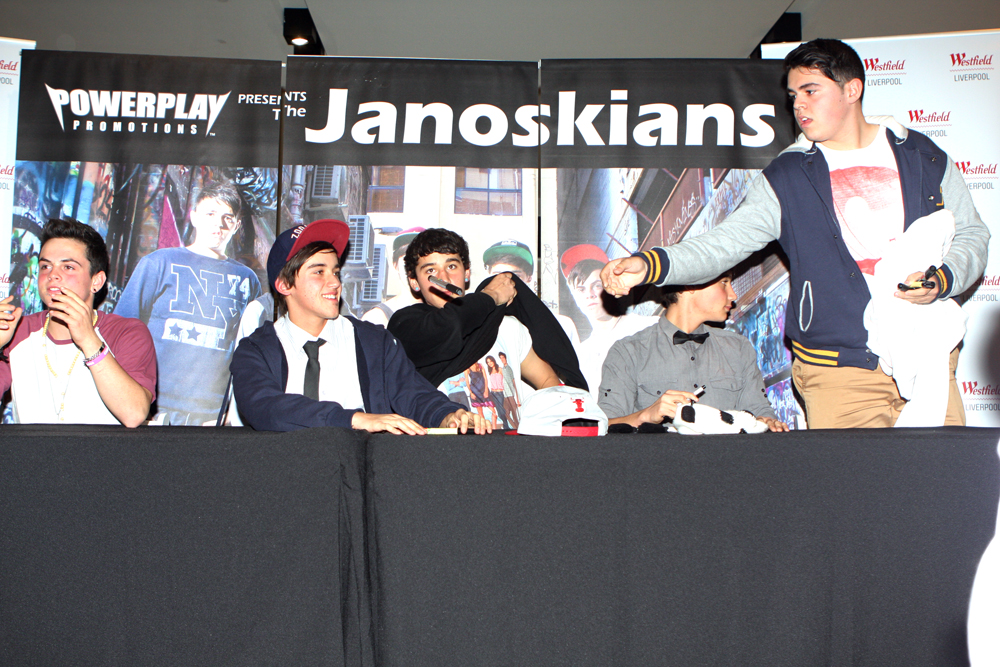
- The Janoskians in 2012. From left: Daniel Sahyounie, Beau Brooks, Luke Brooks, Jai Brooks, James Yammouni.

Background information
- Origin: Melbourne, Victoria, Australia
- Genre: Pop
- Years active: 2011–2018
- Label: Sony Music Australia (2012–2015)
- Past members: Beau Brooks; Jai Brooks; Luke Brooks; Daniel Sahyounie; James Yammouni

YouTube information
- Channel: Janoskians
- Genre: Comedy
- Subscribers: 2.34 million
- Views: 280 million
- Last updated: 20 October 2025

The Janoskians (Just another name of silly kids in another nation) were a YouTube comedy group and pop music group from Melbourne, Australia. The group consisted of the Brooks brothers Beau, Luke and Jai, alongside Daniel Sahyounie and James Yammouni. Their videos include performing gross-out humour and pranks on non-consenting members of the public as well as each other, mockumentaries, dares and skits.

Yammouni left in 2016. In 2018, the Janoskians broke up due to losing interest in maintaining the act.

== Career ==
The Janoskians began their YouTube channel in July 2011; they also have three secondary channels. They were featured on Ellen's Dance Dares. They appeared in the music video for "Forget the World" by Australian singer Faydee on 14 August 2012.

In 2012, the Janoskians signed with Sony Music Australia. Their first single, "Set This World on Fire", was released on 18 September 2012. It spent 3 weeks on the Australian Singles Chart and peaked at number 19. In New Zealand, it debuted at number 23; it spent a single week on the chart. Their follow-up single "Best Friends" debuted at number 30 in Australia before falling off the chart the following week. In late 2012, MTV Australia released the web series The Janoskians: MTV Sessions. In May 2014, Lionsgate signed the group with a movie deal. On 2 March 2015, they released the EP Would U Love Me. Its first single "Real Girls Eat Cake" was their final single to chart in Australia, peaking at number 63. In August, they released the Netflix film Janoskians Untold & Untrue and appeared at the 28th Annual Kids Choice Awards. They released several singles that year and continued to regularly release them through 2018.

On 28 August 2018, the film Public Disturbance was released. Following this, the group ceased using the YouTube platform; Jai Brooks confirmed their break-up in May 2020.

== Criticism ==
The Janoskians have been criticised for their reckless, dangerous and juvenile behaviour, and pushing boundaries too far. Media commentator Prue MacSween stated that, "Their act – if you can call it that – is so juvenile, and I think really irresponsible. It's astounding the power of the internet now. It just tells you that this global audience can be viral and suddenly nobodies with very little talent can suddenly be known by the world". The group has been criticised for pulling "disgusting pranks on strangers" and for engaging in "sleazy, offensive and intimidating" behaviour around babies and women.

== Discography ==
=== EP ===
Title and details
Would U Love Me
- Type: EP
- Released: 2 March 2015
- Record label: Sony Music Australia
Notes

No.	Title	Length
1.	"Would U Love Me"	3:00
2.	"MoodSwings"	2:59
3.	"L.A. Girl"	3:28
4.	"Real Girls Eat Cake"	2:51

=== Singles ===
Year	Title	Peak chart positions				Album
Year	Title	AUS	NL	NZ	UK	Album
2012	"Set This World on Fire"	19	–	23	91	Non-album singles
2013	"Best Friends"	30	83	35	58	Non-album singles
2014	"Real Girls Eat Cake"	63	–	–	37	Would U Love Me
2014	"This Freakin Song" / "This Fuckin Song"	–	—	—	—	Non-album singles
2014	"That's What She Said"	–	—	—	—	Non-album singles
2015	"LA Girl"	–	—	—	—	Would U Love Me
2015	"MoodSwings"	–	—	—	—	Would U Love Me
2015	"Would U Love Me"	–	—	—	—	Would U Love Me
2015	"Friend Zone"	–	—	—	—	Non-album singles
2015	"Teenage Desperate"	–	—	—	—	Non-album singles
2015	"All I Want 4 Christmas"	–	—	—	—	Non-album singles
2016	"Love What You Have"	–	—	—	—	Non-album singles
2017	"One More Time"	–	—	—	—	Non-album singles
2017	"All The Things"	–	—	—	—	Non-album singles
2017	"Enough"	–	—	—	—	Non-album singles
2017	"Oceans"	–	—	—	—	Non-album singles
2018	"F*ck Up"	–	–	–	–	Non-album singles
2018	"We R Us"	–	—	—	—	Non-album singles
"—" denotes a single that did not chart or was not released.
