= Drive You Crazy =

Single by Pitbull featuring Jason Derulo and Juicy J

from the album Globalization
- Released: August 21, 2015
- Recorded: 2014
- Genre: Pop rap; trap
- Length: 3:52
- Label: RCA; Polo Grounds; Mr. 305
- Songwriters: Armando Pérez; Lukasz Gottwald; Henry Walter; Jordan Houston; Djibril "Gibson" Kagni; Jordan "TrackStorm" Houyez; Theron Thomas; Timothy Thomas
- Producers: Dr. Luke; Cirkut

Pitbull singles chronology
"Only Love" (2015)	"Drive You Crazy" (2015)	"Messin' Around" (2016)

Jason Derulo singles chronology
"Follow Me" (2015)	"Drive You Crazy" (2015)	"Get Ugly" (2015)

Juicy J singles chronology
"Make That Shit Work" (2015)	"Drive You Crazy" (2015)	"Yamborghini High" (2016)

"Drive You Crazy" is a song by American rapper Pitbull, featuring American singer Jason Derulo and fellow American rapper Juicy J. The song was released on August 21, 2015 as the fifth official single from Pitbull's eighth studio album Globalization.

== Chart performance ==
Chart (2015)	Peak position
US Rhythmic Airplay (Billboard)	38
