= Ahzee =

American DJ and producer

Kevin Ahzee
- Born: Guyana
- Genre: House music
- Occupation: Singer
- Years active: 2014–present

Ahzee or at times Kevin Ahzee or DJ Ahzee is an American DJ and producer from New York City. Signed to BIP Records and House Garden Records and in the United States to Ultra Music, Ahzee has gained fame mainly in Europe, particularly France and Belgium, through "Born Again" that charted in both countries. He has also released "Drums" jointly with Belgian DJ diMaro (real name Mario Willems).

In October 2014, he was nominated for "Best Club Hit of the Year" for his single "Born Again" during the NRJ DJ Awards held at MICS - Monaco International Clubbing Show. He remains popular in France and in Belgium with his 2015 hit "Make a Wish" charting in Belgian Flanders chart.

== Discography ==
=== Album ===
- Addict (2018)

=== Singles & EPs ===
Year	Singles	Peak positions		
Year	Singles	BEL (Fl)	BEL (Wa)	FR
2013	Born Again	7	19	18
2013	Drums (with diMaro)	11	37	–
2014	King	15	23	86
2014	Bigger Than a Bomb	–	–	–
2014	Poison	–	–	–
2015	Make a Wish	106	–	–
2015	My Passion	–	–	–
2015	Magic	–	–	–
2015	Wings	–	–	–
2016	Burn It Down (with Faydee)	–	–	–
2016	But a Lie (feat. RVRY)	–	–	–
2016	Torture	–	–	–
2016	Go Gyal	–	–	–
2017	Stars	–	–	–
2018	Darkness	–	–	–
2018	We Got This	–	–	–
2018	Jungle	–	–	–
2018	Don't Give Up	–	–	–
2018	Beybosso (with Gohary)	–	–	–
2019	Love	–	–	–
2019	Eyes Closed	–	–	–
2019	Wild	–	–	–
2019	Yes	–	–	–
2019	Fire	–	–	–
2020	Undercover (with Robert Cristian)	–	–	–
2020	Ridin	–	–	–
2020	DADA (feat. Masta & Joshua Khane)	–	–	–
2020	Breathe	–	–	–
2020	Oah	–	–	–
2021	Let Me Go	–	–	–
2021	Sippin'	–	–	–
2021	Ou Té Baba (with TWINNS feat. Nissa Seych & Odrei)	–	–	–
2021	Royalty	–	–	–
2021	High	–	–	–
2022	Forever	–	–	–
2022	Alive	–	–	–
2022	Pump It (with Zave feat. Sonny Flame)	–	–	–
2022	Go Crazy (with Robert Cristian)	–	–	–
2022	Can't Stop	–	–	–
2023	Break You Open	–	–	–
2023	My Way	–	–	–
