= Gene Noble =

American singer

- Born: Manhattan, Kansas, United States
- Origin: Long Island, New York, United States
- Genres: R&B; soul
- Occupations: Vocalist, Writer
- Years active: 2004–present

Gene Noble (Born James Eugene Roston III) is an American singer and songwriter, based in New York and Los Angeles. He is best known for the 2016 song "Only Love" which received airplay on radio stations around the world. He has written songs for artists such as Jason Derulo, Chris Brown, Faith Evans, Usher, CeeLo Green, Jay Z, Alicia Keys, John Legend and Diddy.

== Early life and career ==
Noble was born James Eugene Roston III in Manhattan, Kansas. He grew up traveling with his father, who served in the US military and traveled to wherever in the world he was stationed. His father died in an attempt to rescue another man in 1986 when Noble was aged four. He later moved to Long Island, New York with his mother and brother. A year later, he began playing the piano and writing poetry. Inspired by singer Prince and R&B musician D’Angelo, Noble decided to pursue a career as a musical artist.

On March 4, 2014, Noble released his debut EP, Rebirth of Gene, which was described by Noisey as "Everything from his lofty vocals to the electro production." He released a cover of the 2013 song "Say Something" by A Great Big World.

In 2015, he released the song "Trust". He previously released another song, titled "Money Over Bullshit".

On October 6, 2017, he released the single "Never Know".

In 2017, he released the song "Stolen Moments", which features LaChardon. It would be included on his debut studio album The Cost. The song, as described by Noble, is about "the story of two people who can't officially be together because they are in other situations but it doesn't prevent them from finding time for each other."

In 2019 he appeared with Sting and Shaggy on NPR's Tiny Desk Concert series. His vocal contributions were featured prominently on the last track: a mashup of Shape of My Heart and Lucid Dreams.

== Discography ==
=== Extended plays ===
Title	Details
Rebirth of Gene	Released: March 4, 2014; Label: FEG; Format: Digital download, CD

=== Singles ===
==== As lead artist ====
Title	Year
"Trust"	2015
"For Granted" (featuring Keisha Renee)	2016
"Never Know"	2017

==== As featured artist ====
Title	Year	Peak chart positions	Album
Title	Year	US Digital	Album
"Goin Up" (Tyran Brown featuring Gene Noble)	2015	—	Book of Tyran
"Only Love" (Shaggy featuring Pitbull and Gene Noble)	2015	20	Non-album single
"You Know I Do" (Ffurious featuring Gene Noble)	2017	—	Non-album single

=== Guest appearances ===
Title	Year	Album
"One Day in Heaven" (John Regan featuring Skyzoo & Gene Noble)	2010	Sorry I'm Late
"Glow" (Jake Miller featuring Gene Noble)	2013	The Road Less Traveled
"Dynasty" (Emilio Rojas featuring Gene Noble)	2014	Zero Fucks Given, Vol. One
"Buy My Love" (Emilio Rojas featuring Gene Noble)	2015	L.I.F.E.
"Y.W.M.O." (Wolfgang Gartner featuring Gene Noble)	2016	10 Ways to Steal Home Plate
"Shame (My Name)" (Frzy featuring Gene Noble)	2016	God King Slave
"For You" (Frank Simmons III featuring Gene Noble)	2017	Blacksuite
