= I Don't Wanna Grow Up =

EP by Bebe Rexha
- Released: May 12, 2015
- Genre: Pop; hip hop; R&B
- Length: 18:50
- Label: Warner Bros.
- Producer: The Messengers; Jason Evigan; Jon Levine; The Monsters & Strangerz; Sir Nolan

Bebe Rexha chronology
| I Don't Wanna Grow Up (2015) | All Your Fault: Pt. 1 (2017) |

Singles from I Don't Wanna Grow Up
- 1. "I Can't Stop Drinking About You" Released: April 29, 2014; 2. "I'm Gonna Show You Crazy" Released: December 19, 2014

I Don't Wanna Grow Up is the debut extended play (EP) by American singer Bebe Rexha. It was released on May 12, 2015, through Warner Bros. Records. The EP was produced by The Messengers, Jason Evigan, Jon Levine of The Philosopher Kings, The Monsters & Strangerz, and Sir Nolan. The EP, a pop, hip-hop, and R&B record, was supported by two singles. "I Can't Stop Drinking About You", the first single, was released on April 29, 2014, peaked at number 12 on the Billboard Dance/Mix Show Airplay chart in the United States. The second and final single, "I'm Gonna Show You Crazy", was released on December 19, 2014, and fared more successful than its predecessor, peaking at number 14 on the Singles Digital Top 100 in the Czech Republic and certifying 4× Platinum in Norway. Upon its release, the EP was positively received by music critics, although it did not chart. To support the album, Rexha performed in Europe and in the 2015 Warped Tour.

== Background ==
Before her solo career, Rexha was a part of music duo Black Cards with Pete Wentz of Fall Out Boy, before she began recording her first solo single for her first EP, called "I Can't Stop Drinking About You". "I Can't Stop Drinking About You" was released on April 29, 2014. Since releasing her first solo single, Rexha also appeared on some tracks on Pitbull's album, Globalization (2014), while she was writing and performing as part of the chorus for "Hey Mama" by David Guetta.

In December 2014, the singer published a demo of a track, called "Cry Wolf". The track was first rumored to be her new single. However, four days later, the singer revealed that her next single would be called "I'm Gonna Show You Crazy". The song was finally released a week after it was previewed on December 19, 2014.

== Singles ==
The lead single, "I Can't Stop Drinking About You" was released on April 29, 2014. The single charted on three Billboard charts, including number 31 on the Pop Airplay chart, number 15 on the Bubbling Under Hot 100 chart, and number 12 on the Dance/Mix Show Airplay chart in the United States. A music video was released for the song on August 12, 2014, and was directed by Michael Mihail.

The second single, "I'm Gonna Show You Crazy", was released on December 19, 2014. It did not chart in the United States, but was much more successful internationally. Upon its release, the single charted at number 30 on the Sverigetopplistan chart in Sweden, where the album was certified Platinum by the Swedish Recording Industry Association (GLF) for equivalent sales of 40,000 units in the country. It also charted at number 17 on the Singles Digital Top 100 chart in Slovakia, the VG-lista chart in Norway, and the Suomen virallinen lista chart in Finland. In Norway, the single was certified 4× Platinum by IFPI Norway (IFPI NOR) for equivalent sales of 240,000 units in the country. The song would peak at number 14 on the Singles Digital Top 100 chart in the Czech Republic, and would also be certified Gold by Music Canada (MC) and Recorded Music New Zealand (RMNZ) for equivalent sales of 40,000 and 15,000 units in their respective countries. A music video was released on April 21, 2015, and was directed by Hannah Lux Davis.

== Critical reception ==
Upon its release, I Don't Wanna Grow Up was reviewed by ArtistDirect, with Rick Florino describing the EP as "unabashedly fun yet starkly emotional" with everything being a "delicate balance of hypnotic honesty and heartfelt hookiness, separating her from the pack". With respect to the song "Pray", her vocal range is portrayed as "downright impressive as she hits expansive runs and high notes, carrying these sorts of cleverly confessional lines". Robbie Daw of Idolator stated that the song "Pray" "displays perhaps a more emotional side of Bebe than we’ve heard in her past single releases".

== Tour ==
To support the release of her first EP, Rexha performed across Europe; in addition, singing as part of the Warped Tour.

== Track listing ==
| No. | Title | Writer(s) | Producer(s) | Length |
|---|---|---|---|---|
| 1. | "I Don't Wanna Grow Up" | Bleta Rexha; Nolan Lambroza; Nasri Atweh | Sir Nolan; The Messengers | 4:08 |
| 2. | "Sweet Beginnings" | Rexha; Jason Evigan | Evigan | 3:50 |
| 3. | "I'm Gonna Show You Crazy" | Rexha; Jon Levine; Lauren Christy | Levine | 3:27 |
| 4. | "Pray" | Rexha; Stefan Johnson; Jordan Johnson; Marcus Lomax; Alexander Izquierdo; Sam Watters | The Monsters and the Strangerz | 3:47 |
| 5. | "I Can't Stop Drinking About You" | Rexha; S. Johnson; J. Johnson; Lomax | The Monsters and the Strangerz | 3:36 |
| Total length: | | | | 18:50 |

== Release history ==
| Region | Date | Format | Label | Ref. |
|---|---|---|---|---|
| United States | May 12, 2015 | CD; digital download | Warner Bros. | |
| Australia | May 12, 2015 | CD; digital download | Warner Bros. | |
