= Habibi (I Need Your Love) =

2014 single by Shaggy, Mohombi, Faydee and Costi

Single by Shaggy featuring Mohombi, Faydee and Costi
- Released: 2014
- Genre: Dancehall; reggae
- Length: 3:36
- Label: RED
- Songwriters: Constantin Ionita; Fady Fatrouni (Faydee); Mohombi Nzasi Moupondo; Orville Burrell (Shaggy); Dimitriu Silviu Aurelian
- Producer: Constantin Ionita

Shaggy singles chronology
"Remain in Our Hearts" (2014)	"Habibi (I Need Your Love)" (2014)	"I Need Your Love" (2014)

Mohombi singles chronology
"Summertime" (2014)	"Habibi (I Need Your Love)" (2014)	"Universe" (2014)

Faydee singles chronology
"Maria" (2014)	"Habibi (I Need Your Love)" (2014)	"Move On (C'est La Vie)" (2015)

Costi singles chronology
"Habibi (I Need Your Love)" (2014)

Music video
- "Habibi (I Need Your Love)" on YouTube

"I Need Your Love"

Single by Shaggy featuring Mohombi, Faydee and Costi
- Released: 22 December 2014
- Length: 3:36
- Songwriter: See above

Shaggy singles chronology
"Habibi (I Need Your Love)" (2014)	"I Need Your Love" (2014)	"Only Love" (2015)

Music video
- "I Need Your Love" on YouTube

"Habibi (I Need Your Love)" is a song by Jamaican rapper Shaggy featuring ensemble of Congolese-Swedish singer Mohombi, Australian singer Faydee and Romanian singer Costi. In a later specially released version targeting English language markets, the song is retitled "I Need Your Love" crediting Shaggy as main performer featuring Mohombi, Faydee and Costi. The song was written by Faydee and Costi. The song is in Arabic, English and Spanish. "Habibi" means "my love" in Arabic language. Additionally a number of mixed language versions were released including Bulgarian, French and Russian.

== Releases ==
The main release of the single "Habibi (I Need Your Love)" has the vocal collaborations of the Jamaican reggae singer and deejay Shaggy (Orville Richard Burrell), the Swedish singer of Congolese and Swedish origins Mohombi (Mohombi Nzasi Moupondo), as well as co-writers and performers the Australian-Lebanese singer Faydee (Fady Fatrouni) and Romanian Costi Ioniță.

The song was released in 2014 becoming very popular in night venues internationally. Prominent success occurred in the Middle East and the Arab World, Australia, continental Europe, particularly the Balkans and Eastern Europe (most prominently Romania and Moldova). Various local versions also became popular in Russia and in Asia.

In 2015, it got even wider attention after charting on the US Billboard Hot 100 main chart peaking at number 66 with a version crediting Shaggy as main performer. The Shaggy-credited version also charted on other Billboard charts, notably the Mainstream Top 40, Dance/Mix Show Airplay and Rhythmic charts crediting Shaggy as main performer.

== Music video ==
A music video was shot in Valencia, Spain with all four performers portrayed having fun at a public music venue, at a stadium, during a festival and on various tourist attractions in Spain and on a yacht in the sea. The video was produced by Romanian singer Costi through his record and video production company. Just like in the main release, there are two versions of the video one including Arabic as "Habibi (I Need Your Love)" and one excluding Arabic for English language markets as "I Need Your Love".

== "I Need Your Love" ==
A special release targeting the American, UK, Japanese and Australian markets excludes the Arabic language segments, as Faydee performs his own parts in English instead. This special version excludes the Arabic word "Habibi" in the title retitling it as "I Need Your Love". The release is credited to Shaggy as main performer with the full credit as "Shaggy featuring Mohombi, Faydee, Costi".

This version on RED Associated Labels, a division of Sony Music Entertainment charted in several countries including the Netherlands, United States and the United Kingdom.

In mid-May 2015, "I Need Your Love" charted at number 66 on the US Billboard Hot 100, becoming Shaggy's first top 100 hit since "Angel" in America.

== Language versions ==
The song proved popular and many local versions were also produced through collaborations with well-known local artists, notably:

- Bulgarian singer Galena as "Habibi" in a Bulgarian language version containing some mixes in Arabic by Faydee and in English and Spanish. The version was credited to "Galena featuring Faydee".
- Uzbek singer Shahzoda in a Russian language version also with some additional verses in Arabic by Faydee, and in English and Spanish by Costi. This version was retitled "Habibi (Улыбнись и все Ок)" (meaning Habibi, smile and everything will be ok in Russian). The version was credited to "Shahzoda featuring Faydee & Dr. Costi". A separate music video was shot for this version.
- A multilingual version including French language verses was released for France and the francophone markets in Belgium and Switzerland under the title "Habibi Love (French Kiss)". The additional French verses are sung by Mohombi.
- Spanish bilingual version alongside English was released as "I Need Your Love (Te Quiero Mas)" and was credited to Shaggy featuring Mohombi, Faydee, Costi.
- Later a pan-Latin remix version was released as "Te Quiero Mas" with additional lyrics sung by Don Omar and Farruko. The remix was credited to Shaggy featuring Don Omar, Farruko, Faydee, Mohombi & Costi and was produced by Costi.

== Live performances ==
Faydee performed it live during the Media Music Awards in Romania broadcast on MTV Romania on 10 October 2014.

The Bulgarian version was performed live by Galena, Faydee and Costi during a gala broadcast on the Bulgarian Planeta HD station.

Faydee has also had a number of appearances in interviews on mainly Romanian television and radio stations performing live versions of the song.

== Charts ==
=== Weekly charts ===
Weekly chart performance for "I Need Your Love"
Chart (2015)	Peak position
Austria (Ö3 Austria Top 40)	75
Belgium (Ultratip Bubbling Under Flanders)	38
Belgium Urban (Ultratop Flanders)	30
Belgium (Ultratip Bubbling Under Wallonia)	6
Canada Hot 100 (Billboard)	74
Finland Download (Latauslista)	8
France (SNEP)	147
Germany (GfK)	91
Ireland (IRMA)	93
Netherlands (Dutch Top 40)	8
Netherlands (Single Top 100)	10
Poland (Video Chart)	5
Poland (Polish Airplay New)	1
Spain (Promusicae)	25
UK Singles (Official Charts)	36
US Billboard Hot 100	66
US Dance Airplay (Billboard)	16
US Pop Airplay (Billboard)	20
US Rhythmic Airplay (Billboard)	27

=== Year-end charts ===
Year-end chart performance for "I Need Your Love"
Chart (2015)	Position
Netherlands (Dutch Top 40)	32
Netherlands (Single Top 100)	76

== Certifications ==
Certifications for "I Need Your Love"
Region	Certification	Certified units/sales
Canada (Music Canada)	Gold	40,000^{*}
Spain (Promusicae)	Gold	20,000^{‡}
United Kingdom (BPI)	Silver	200,000^{‡}
United States (RIAA)	Gold	500,000^{‡}
^{*} Sales figures based on certification alone.^{‡} Sales+streaming figures based on certification alone.

== See also ==
- "Habibi I Love You"
- List of music released by Romanian artists that has charted in major music markets
