= I Can't Stop Drinking About You =

2014 single by Bebe Rexha

Single by Bebe Rexha

from the EP I Don't Wanna Grow Up
- Released: April 29, 2014
- Genre: Electropop
- Length: 3:36
- Label: Warner Bros.
- Songwriters: Bebe Rexha; Jordan Johnson; Marcus Lomax; Stefan Johnson
- Producer: The Monsters & Strangerz

Bebe Rexha singles chronology
"I Can't Stop Drinking About You" (2014)	"I'm Gonna Show You Crazy" (2014)

Music video
- "I Can't Stop Drinking About You" on YouTube

"I Can't Stop Drinking About You" is the debut single by American singer and songwriter Bebe Rexha from her debut extended play, I Don't Wanna Grow Up (2015). The song was written by Rexha, Jordan Johnson, Marcus Lomax and Stefan Johnson, and produced by the Monsters & Strangerz. It was released as the lead single for digital download and streaming by Warner Bros. in various countries on April 29, 2014. "I Can't Stop Drinking About You" is an electropop song, capturing the emotion after a heartbreak and drinking the pain away.

The song received positive reviews from music critics upon release, with praise concentrated on the song's music, lyrics and Rexha's vocal delivery. It peaked at number 15 on the US Billboard Bubbling Under Hot 100 chart and reached number 12 on the Dance/Mix Show Airplay chart as well as number 31 on the Mainstream Top 40 ranking. A music video, directed by Michael Mihail, was released to Rexha's YouTube channel on August 12, 2014, and draws influence from Girl, Interrupted (1999) and Melancholia (2011).

== Background and composition ==
After signing a record contract with Warner in 2013, Rexha rose to prominence as a songwriter for penning several successful singles, including "Glowing" (2012) by Nikki Williams, "Like a Champion" (2013) by Selena Gomez and most notably "The Monster" (2013) by Eminem. "I Can't Stop Drinking About You" was written by Rexha alongside Jordan Johnson (JJordvn), Marcus Lomax and Stefan Johnson, and produced by the Monsters & Strangerz. The song was released for digital download and streaming by Warner on April 29, 2014, as the lead single from Rexha's debut extended play I Don't Wanna Grow Up (2015). In talking about its meaning, Rexha wrote the song after a breakup and stated, "I fell deep for this guy who told me that he was in love with me, but that he couldn't be with me because he was still in love with his ex. I poured my heart out [...] and told him to leave me alone [be]cause I was too busy drinking about him." Musically, "I Can't Stop Drinking About You" is an electropop song. It lyrically captures the emotion after a heartbreak and drinking the pain away, as she sings, "Darling tell me what more can I do and don't you know I was meant for you?"

== Reception ==
"I Can't Stop Drinking About You" received positive reviews from music critics upon release. In complementing her vocal delivery, Jason Lipshutz from Billboard opined that "[Rexha] stumbles through a bad breakup and reaches P!nk-level anger toward the one that drove her to drink." Steff Yotka for Nylon similarly lauded the singer's vocals and the song's music, commenting that "[it] highlights [her] crazy-good voice [with] a beat that's so dance-worthy." Bradley Stern of Idolator dubbed the song as a "dark, devastating heartbreak anthem". Writing for MTV, Stern labeled it a "certifiable smash" and commented that "[she] wails before diving headfirst into a giant wave of EDM." A writer for iHeartRadio commended the singer's vocals, adding "she's already got killer vocal chops, proven songwriting street cred, and an incredible debut single with ['the song']." Commercially, "I Can't Stop Drinking About You" reached number 15 on the US Billboard Bubbling Under Hot 100 chart. The song further peaked at number 12 on the Dance/Mix Show Airplay and number 31 on the Mainstream Top 40 rankings.

== Music video ==
The music video for "I Can't Stop Drinking About You" was uploaded to Rexha's YouTube channel on 12 August 2014. Directed by Michael Mihail, Rexha alluded that she wanted to capture the feeling of heart break and the whirlwind of emotions, with "a bit of anger, frustration, sadness, the craziness", and the "fear of the unknown". The video draws inspiration from the American psychological drama film Girl, Interrupted (1999) and apocalyptic drama film Melancholia (2011). It starts with Rexha lying on a bed inside a vacant house, proceeding with her sitting around a table in a garden, surrounded by empty bottles and a porcelain set. In the following scene, she is seen lying flat on the floor in a dark room, with empty bottles around her, which she begins throwing at a nearby wall. Further interspersed shots show her dressed in a white dress in a dark body of water, facing a man at whom she is screaming. While Mandy Rogers of EQ Music described it as a "smouldering and dramatic" visual, Lipshutz from Billboard said that it "introduces Rexha as a striking pop personality while zeroing in on her most dramatic impulses."

== Track listing ==
- Digital download and streaming
1. "I Can't Stop Drinking About You" – 3:36
- Digital download and streaming – Remixes
1. "I Can't Stop Drinking About You" (Chainsmokers Remix) – 4:23
2. "I Can't Stop Drinking About You" (Quintino Remix) – 5:07
3. "I Can't Stop Drinking About You" (Dawin Remix) – 4:06
4. "I Can't Stop Drinking About You" (Felix Snow Remix) – 3:21
5. "I Can't Stop Drinking About You" (Jumpsmokers Remix) – 3:48

== Charts ==
Chart performance for "I Can't Stop Drinking About You"
Chart (2014)	Peak position
US Bubbling Under Hot 100 (Billboard)	15
US Dance/Mix Show Airplay (Billboard)	12
US Pop Airplay (Billboard)	31

== Release history ==
Release dates and formats for "I Can't Stop Drinking About You"
Region	Date	Format(s)	Label	Version	Ref.
Various	April 29, 2014	Digital download; streaming	Warner	Original	
Various	August 25, 2014	Digital download; streaming	Warner	Remixes	
Italy	October 13, 2014	Radio airplay	Warner	Original	
