= Costi Ioniță =

Romanian singer (born 1978)

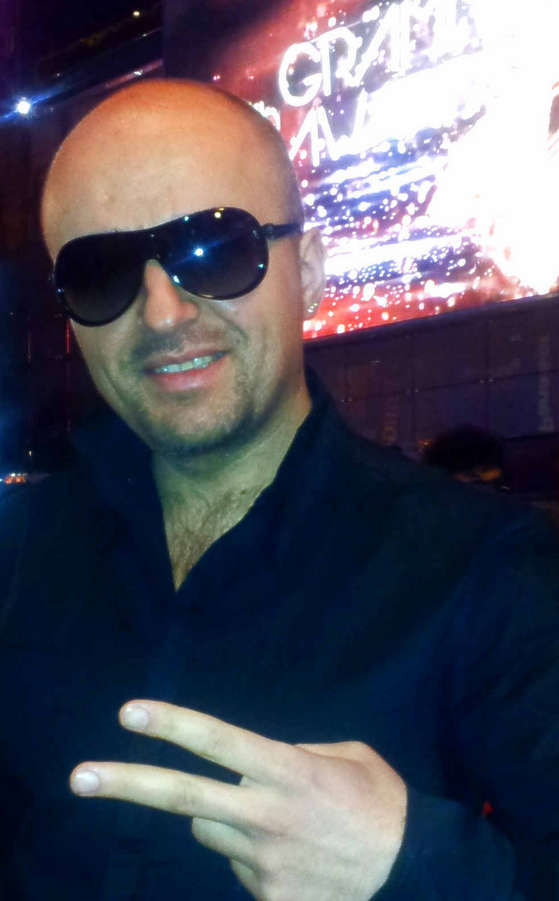
- Costi in 2012

Background information
- Born: Constantin Ioniță; 14 January 1978 (age 48); Constanța, Romania
- Genres: Dance; pop; rock; opera; Balkan; trance, pop-folk; reggae fusion; reggaeton
- Occupations: Singer; songwriter
- Years active: 1998–present
- Label: Doctor Music
- Formerly of: Valahia; Sahara
- Website: costi.ro

Constantin "Costi" Ioniță (Romanian pronunciation: [ˈkosti joˈnitsə]; born 14 January 1978) is a Romanian singer regarded as one of the most celebrated ethnic Romanian vocalists of muzică orientală (manele), and a musician from Constanța.

== Career ==
Born in Constanța, on the 14th of January, 1978, and a dentist by training, Costi began his musical career by singing Romanian traditional folkloric music. He however achieved fame as a member of the pop boy band Valahia, enjoying several hits. In 1999, he started to experiment with manele, a composite Balkanic musical style, and in 2000 he collaborated with acclaimed manele singer Adrian Minune on Of, viața mea ("Oh, my life"), one of the first mainstream successes of the genre in Romania. Following Valahia's dissolution in 2002, he started a solo career, concentrating on manele. In this period he collaborated with several well known manele singers. His success is considered unusual, as he is one of the few ethnic Romanians in a genre perceived as Romani. Unlike some Romani counterparts, Costi Ioniță does not use a nickname. Despite his success in manele, he also experimented with other musical styles, such as rock, dance or opera, avoiding to be identified with manele or to be too closely associated with the Romani culture.

In the late 2000s, Costi extended his act in the Balkans and Middle East, achieving success in Turkey and Saudi Arabia with the song Ca la Amsterdam ("Like in Amsterdam"), a tune included in the 2010 compilation issued by Café del Mar. He also launched several hits in Bulgaria, in collaboration with local pop-folk singers, including the duo Sahara with Andrea.

On 28 June 2007, he launched a music channel, Party TV, broadcasting party music, and in October that year his company received licence for another two music TV channels, one of them, Mynele TV, dedicated to promoting manele. Mynele TV was launched on 1 July 2008, just 3 days earlier after the first anniversary of Party TV. MusiKlub was launched on 20 November 2009, broadcasting club music. Party TV was closed at the end of 2011, due to remaining without a license. MusiKlub was closed on 26 February 2015. Mynele TV was closed on 10 March 2015, due to remaining without a license.

Since 2008, Costi has acted as producer and songwriter for the pop rock girl band Blaxy Girls. In 2009, he reached the finals of the Romanian selection for the Eurovision Song Contest with three songs he composed, one sung by himself, one by Blaxy Girls, and the third by another group, IMBA.

In 2015, Costi became internationally known with the Faydee Sonita song "Habibi (I Need Your Love)" that was credited to Shaggy, Mohombi, Faydee and Costi. A revamped version with a title change to "I Need Your Love" credited to Shaggy featuring Mohombi, Faydee and Costi became a hit on various U.S. dance charts and reached #66 on the Billboard Hot 100. It also peaked at #36 on the UK Singles Chart. The song has also charted on many European charts including official singles charts in Austria, Belgium, France, Germany and the Netherlands and also gained great popularity in the Middle East.

He was chosen to dub Gambit voice in the animated series- X Men.

== Discography ==
=== Singles featured in ===
Year	Single	Peak positions									
Year	Single	AUT	BEL (Wa)	FR	GER	NED	UK	US	US Dance/Mix Show Airplay	US Mainstream Top 40	US Rhythmic
2009	Pentru o fortele mele (credited to Adrian Cioroianu Jr & Costi)										
2014	"I Need Your Love" (credited to Shaggy feat. Mohombi, Faydee, Costi)	75	6* (Ultratip)	147	91	10	36	66	16	20	27

*Did not appear in the official Belgian Ultratop 50 charts, but rather in the bubbling under Ultratip charts.

== See also ==
- List of music released by Romanian artists that has charted in major music markets
