= Bebe (album) =

2023 studio album by Bebe Rexha

Studio album by Bebe Rexha
- Released: April 28, 2023
- Recorded: 2021–2023
- Studios: Electric Lady (New York); Henry's House (Los Angeles); Peacemode (Los Angeles); Rancho Pagzilla (North Hollywood); The Compound (Los Angeles); Valentine (Los Angeles)
- Genres: Dance-pop; disco
- Length: 36:58
- Label: Warner
- Producers: Mitch Allan; Alex Bilowitz; Burns; Ray Goren; David Guetta; Joe Janiak; Jussi Karvinen; Nick Monson; Tim Pagnotta; Brian Phillips; Timofey Reznikov; Rykeyz; TMS; Ido Zmishlany

Bebe Rexha chronology
Better Mistakes (2021)	Bebe (2023)	Dirty Blonde (2026)

Singles from Bebe
- 1. "Heart Wants What It Wants" Released: February 17, 2023; 2. "Call on Me" Released: March 31, 2023; 3. "Satellite" Released: April 19, 2023

Bebe is the third studio album by American singer-songwriter Bebe Rexha. It was released on April 28, 2023 by Warner Records, as the follow-up to her second studio album, Better Mistakes (2021). The album was supported by three singles. Rexha collaborated with various producers on it, including Jussifer, Joe Janiak and Ido Zmishlany. Inspired by the 1970s and 1980s, it combines dance, disco, Eurodance, funk, pop and rock music. The album is centered on the themes of empowerment, self-reflection and personal development.

The album was preceded by three singles, "Heart Wants What It Wants", "Call on Me", and "Satellite" with Snoop Dogg between February and April 2023. "I'm Good (Blue)", a collaboration with David Guetta, is also included in the record. "Heart Wants What It Wants", "Satellite", and the non-album single, "Seasons" with Dolly Parton, were accompanied by music videos.

Bebe garnered favorable reviews from music critics for its music, lyrics and Rexha's vocal renditions as well as her artistic versatility. The album charted at number 132 on the US Billboard 200, number 36 in Canada and certified gold, and reaching the top 100 in France and Japan. This is Rexha's final album with Warner Records before she departed from the label in 2025.

== Background and release ==
On February 8, 2023, Bebe Rexha hosted a listening event in Los Angeles to reveal details about the forthcoming release of her third studio album Bebe. On that day, Rexha alluded to the lead single, "Heart Wants What It Wants", and teased the collaborations, notably "Satellite" with American rapper Snoop Dogg and "Seasons" with singer Dolly Parton. The confirmed release date of April 28, along with the cover art, was published on March 15 through Rexha's social media channels. Subsequently, on March 30, the comprehensive track listing was publicly disclosed. As planned, on April 28, Warner released the album for digital download and streaming across various countries. Opting to title Bebe, Rexha aimed to provide a more profound understanding of herself, stating, "because I feel like it's time that people know who I am and learn more about me and my story." The singer emphasized a commitment to openness in her lyrics, framing the album as a platform for empowerment, self-reflection and personal development. The creation began in December 2021, with "Seasons" being the first song written. She shared a notable sense of pride for this song, especially due to her long-standing desire to collaborate with Parton. As she fell in "love" with the 1970s, the singer collaborated extensively with Jussifer, Joe Janiak and Ido Zmishlany, who assisted her in delving into the musical influences from that period. Throughout the process, Rexha immersed herself in the works of American singers such as Donna Summer and Stevie Nicks. The songs of the album were recorded across various studios, including in New York at Electric Lady as well as in Los Angeles at Henry's House, Peacemode, Rancho Pagzilla, The Compound and Valentine.

== Singles and promotion ==
Ahead of the release of Bebe, three singles premiered between February and April 2023, with two of them complemented by corresponding music videos. "Heart Wants What It Wants" debuted as the album's first single on February 17, attaining a position in the top 100 in Bulgaria, Croatia, Hungary, Lebanon and Poland. Its 1970s-themed video showcases Rexha amidst vintage filming equipment in a retro setting and offers a behind-the-scenes portrayal of the filming procedure. "Call on Me" was released as the album's second single on March 31, peaking at number 13 on the US Billboard Hot Dance/Electronic Songs ranking. Satellite with Snoop Dogg launched as the album's third single on April 19, entering the top 50 in Croatia, Hungary, Poland and Romania. Its animated video depicts Rexha and Snoop Dogg's journey through the "Bebeverse" and was inspired by cartoons produced by Hanna-Barbera and Warner in the 1960s and 1970s, including Duck Dodgers in the 24½th Century (1953), The Jetsons (1962), Josie and the Pussycats (1963) and Star Trek (1966). While not labeled as a single of the album, "I'm Good (Blue)" a collaborative effort with David Guetta, was introduced on August 26, 2022, and incorporated into the album. Topping rankings in 20 countries, the single claimed number one on the US Dance/Electronic Songs, Dance/Mix Show Airplay and Mainstream Top 40 charts, also representing the second longest-running chart-topper in the Dance/Electronic chart. Among others, it received a double platinum certification from the Recording Industry Association of America (RIAA) for selling more than 2,000,000 units in the US. As part of the promotion, a black-and-white video for the song "Seasons" was concurrently released with the album, in which Rexha and Parton appear as mirror-like images of each other, both adorned in monochromatic outfits.

== Music and lyrics ==
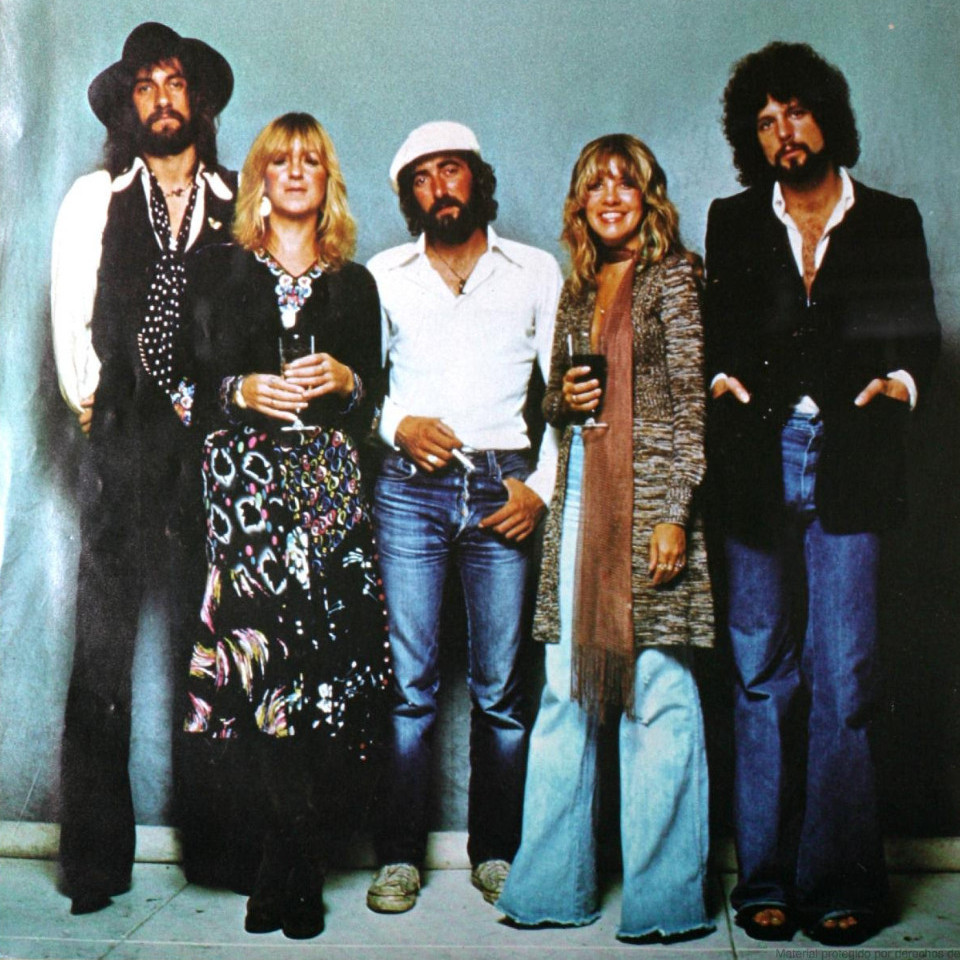
Bebe Rexha drew substantial inspiration from the British-American group Fleetwood Mac in the creative process of developing Bebe.

With a duration time of 36 minutes and 58 seconds, Bebe combines various genres of dance, disco, Eurodance, pop and rock intertwined with sounds from the 1970s and 1980s. Detailing the album's aspiration, Rexha highlighted the impact of the British-American group Fleetwood Mac, describing their song "Landslide" (1975) as "one of the greatest songs of all time", and an infusion of her preferred '70s sounds. Growing up in a household with immigrant parents, her early musical exposure revolved around Albanian music until an exploration into the diverse sounds of that period broadened her palette. Opening with "Heart Wants What It Wants", the song unfolds as a blend of disco, funk and pop, complemented by a dance-pop beat, drums and guitars. Centered on the emotion of falling in love within a relationship, it places emphasis on the notions of empowerment and self-love. Following, "Miracle Man" represents a pop song advocating belief in love and delving into the pursuit of an ideal romantic partner. "Satellite" in collaboration with Snoop Dogg stands as a love song integrating disco and pop music with funk and dance-pop elements. Its focus lies in commemorating the 4/20 culture, telling a tale of getting high and being sent to an alternate universe. "When It Rains" emerges as an upbeat dancefloor breakup song.

Progressing with "Call on Me", it is a dance, EDM and house-pop song incorporating an electronic sound. It revolves around depending on yourself and having a good time whenever and however you want without seeking help from anybody. "I'm Good (Blue)" in collaboration with David Guetta comprises upbeat club, dance and electronic genres, interpolating Italian group Eiffel 65's single "Blue (Da Ba Dee)" (1998). It captures the anticipation of a long clubbing night ahead and the excitement of having one of the best nights. "Visions (Don't Go)" has a retro electro-pop chorus. "I'm Not High, I'm in Love" is a disco-characterized pop song employing the metaphor of being stoned to display how gone she is with her love for a specific person. "Blue Moon" is a disco-tinged folk-orientated song with rock tones. "Born Again" is a ballad with an acoustic and electric chorus, including backing choir. Inspired by the anti-abortion legislation, "I Am" is a rock-infused ballad in which Rexha reflects on her roots and finding strength as a woman in today's world. Closing with "Seasons" in collaboration with Dolly Parton, the song takes the form of an introspective country and pop ballad strengthened by a soft beat and slide guitar. The song reminisces about youth, with Rexha and Parton expressing a longing for the past while balancing memories of their youth with the wisdom of age.

== Critical reception ==
Professional ratings
Review scores
Source	Rating
AllMusic	4/5 stars
Jenesaispop	3/5 stars
Medium	3.5/10
PopMatters	7/10

Upon release, Bebe garnered a warm reception from music critics. Writing for Rolling Stone, Tomás Mier highlighted the album as a "stark" departure from the "darker energy" characterizing Rexha's earlier music. The pervasive "optimism" resonates throughout every song, portraying the evolution of the "California pop queen" into a luminary of a "dance-floor inferno", resulting in what is deemed her "best album" to date. Neil Z. Yeung from AllMusic observed the album as signaling an "authentic representation" of Rexha, leading to a "noticeable improvement" in quality and her "most sonically cohesive and focused statement" thus far. Diverging from past styles, the album leaves a "stronger impression" than its predecessors, reinforcing her standing as a "masterful pop songwriter" with notable high points, positioning her a step closer to her "fully realized vision" and a defining "spotlight moment". Ryan Bulbeck for Renowned for Sound characterized the album as comprising two halves, interweaving a "beautifully" crafted "singer-songwriter" essence with a "brilliantly" produced album. Despite the inherent contrast between these two parts, Bulbeck asserted that "no one track fails to uplift the project as a whole".

Gary Gerard Hamilton from The Independent commended the incorporation of the "energy and musicality" of the 1970s, complementing by the "glam and vibrant album art". Chris Malone Méndez for Forbes applauded Rexha's "sonic versatility" displayed throughout the album. Jeffrey Davies of PopMatters discerned Rexha's talent to shine without merely adopting "nostalgic sounds". Rather than conforming to contemporary styles for mainstream success, the album reflects a departure from caution, presenting music that Rexha "genuinely enjoys", creating a "fun" listening experience as an added bonus. A critic from Medium opined that the album falls short with its "generic pop sound", featuring "bright" yet "stereotypical" songs and various collaborations. The critic shared concern about Rexha's lack of a "definitive sound or personality", noting that several songs sound either "dated or too generic", ultimately suggesting that the album doesn't resonate well with them, while acknowledging her vocal talent. According to Jordi Bardají from Jenesaispop, the album reflects an apparent effort to achieve a minimum of "sonic coherence", falling short of being Rexha's envisioned "definitive" or "personal" work. Bardají also noticed that some the "most powerful" songs, such as "Call On Me", lack resonance, and "When It Rains" bears resemblance to English-Albanian singer Dua Lipa's song "Physical" (2020), leading to the album's perceived state of indecision with filler and unexpected compositions. Furthermore, Rolling Stone positioned Bebe at number 77 in its year-end compilation of the best albums of 2023, while AllMusic recognized it among their favorite pop albums.

== Commercial performance ==
On the issue dated May 13, 2023, Bebe made its debut on the US Billboard 200 ranking at number 132. However, the album achieved a more favorable position in Canada, peaking at number 36 and remaining on the Canadian Albums Chart for a total of 11 weeks. In November 2023, it garnered a gold certification from Music Canada (MC) for shifting more than 40,000 units in Canada. Furthermore, the album reached positions in international charts, peaking at number 94 in France and number 97 in Japan, both within their respective top 100.

== Track listing ==
Bebe track listing
No.	Title	Writer(s)	Producer(s)	Length
1.	"Heart Wants What It Wants"	Bebe Rexha; Liana Banks; Bonnie McKee; Sarah Solovay; Ray Goren; Jussi Karvinen; Ido Zmishlany; Ryan Williamson; Ray Goren	Jussifer; Zmishlany; Rykeyz; Goren	3:02
2.	"Miracle Man"	Rexha; McKee; Solovay; Jesse St. John Geller; Zmishlany	Zmishlany	3:28
3.	"Satellite" (with Snoop Dogg)	Rexha; Samantha DeRosa; Maya Kurchner; Dominic Perfetti; Joseph Janiak; Calvin Broadus, Jr.	Janiak	3:28
4.	"When It Rains"	Rexha; Tighe; Chloe George; Karvinen	Jussifer; Mitch Allan	2:22
5.	"Call on Me"	Rexha; Janée Bennett; Dave Gibson; Matthew Burns	Burns	2:50
6.	"I'm Good (Blue)" (with David Guetta)	Rexha; Camille Purcell; Phil Plested; Pierre Guetta; Massimo Gabutti; Maurizio Lobina; Gianfranco Randone	David Guetta; Timofey Reznikov	2:55
7.	"Visions (Don't Go)"	Rexha; Casey Smith; Sean Douglas; Thomas Barnes; Peter Kelleher; Benjamin Kohn	TMS	3:18
8.	"I'm Not High, I'm in Love"	Rexha; Solovay; Geller; Zmishlany	Zmishlany	3:04
9.	"Blue Moon"	Rexha; DeRosa; Perfetti; Janiak	Janiak	3:13
10.	"Born Again"	Rexha; Michelle Buzz; Karvinen; Nicholas Monson; Alexander Bilowitz	Jussifer; Monson; Bilowitz	3:00
11.	"I Am"	Rexha; Kurchner; Whitney Phillips; Janiak; Tim Pagnotta; Brian Phillips	Pagnotta; Phillips	2:55
12.	"Seasons" (with Dolly Parton)	Rexha; Solovay; Zmishlany	Zmishlany	3:23
Total length:				36:58

Japanese CD bonus tracks
No.	Title	Length
13.	"Heart Wants What It Wants" (MK Remix)	3:40
14.	"Heart Wants What It Wants" (Nicky Romero Remix)	4:13
Total length:		44:51

== Charts ==
Chart performance for Bebe
Chart (2023)	Peak position
Canadian Albums (Billboard)	36
French Albums (SNEP)	94
Japanese Digital Albums (Oricon)	27
Japanese Hot Albums (Billboard Japan)	97
UK Album Downloads (Official Charts)	23
US Billboard 200	132

== Certifications ==
Certifications for Bebe
Region	Certification	Certified units/sales
Canada (Music Canada)	Gold	40,000^{‡}
^{‡} Sales+streaming figures based on certification alone.

== Release history ==
Release dates and formats for Bebe
Region	Date	Format(s)	Label	Ref.
Various	April 28, 2023	CD; digital download; streaming; vinyl	Warner	
