= Heart Wants What It Wants =

2023 single by Bebe Rexha

Single by Bebe Rexha

from the album Bebe
- Released: February 17, 2023
- Genre: Disco; funk; pop
- Length: 3:02
- Label: Warner
- Songwriters: Bebe Rexha; Bonnie McKee; Ido Zmishlany; Jussi Karvinen; Liana Banks; Ray Goren; Ryan Williamson; Sarah Solovay
- Producer: Ido Zmishlany

Bebe Rexha singles chronology
"I'm Good (Blue)" (2022)	"Heart Wants What It Wants" (2023)	"Call On Me" (2023)

Music video
- "Heart Wants What It Wants" on YouTube

"Heart Wants What It Wants" is a song by American singer and songwriter Bebe Rexha from her third studio album Bebe (2023). It was written by Rexha, Bonnie McKee, Ido Zmishlany, Jussi Karvinen, Liana Banks, Ray Goren, Ryan Williamson and Sarah Solovay, with the production completed by Zmishlany. The song was released as the lead single from the album for digital download and streaming in various countries by Warner on February 17, 2023. It has been described as 1970s disco, funk and pop song that discovers the emotion of when you fall out of love.

Upon release, the song garnered positive reviews from music critics for its music, lyrics as well as Rexha's vocal delivery. Commercially, it reached number 10 in Bulgaria and number 21 on the New Zealand Hot Singles chart as well as the top 40 on the US Billboard Adult Top 40 and Mainstream Top 40 rankings. The 1970s-themed music video premiered on Rexha's YouTube channel on February 17 that showcases her performing in a retro-described setting with behind-the-scenes process of the shoot.

== Background and composition ==
On February 8, 2023, Rexha announced her third studio album Bebe (2023) and its lead single "Heart Wants What It Wants" at a listening event in Los Angeles. The song follows the earlier release of "I'm Good (Blue)", a collaborative effort with French disc jockey David Guetta that enjoyed international success. It was written by Rexha, Bonnie McKee, Ido Zmishlany, Jussi Karvinen, Liana Banks, Ray Goren, Ryan Williamson and Sarah Solovay, with the production completed by Zmishlany. With a length of three minutes and two seconds, the song was released for digital download and streaming in various countries by Warner on February 17, 2023.

"Heart Wants What It Wants" has been described as a 1970s disco, funk and pop song, incorporating a dance-pop beat. The song discovers the emotion of when "you fall out of love" as well as themes of empowerment and self-love. During the lyrics, Rexha aims to make it clear to her significant other that she cannot guarantee to love him eternally, having previously believed that her ex was her one true love until her heart decided otherwise. Two remixes, which were done by MK and Nicky Romero, accompanied the single's release in March 2023.

== Reception ==
Upon release, "Heart Wants What It Wants" received positive reviews from music critics. According to George Griffiths from the Official Charts Company, the song is as a "breakout hit" that serves as a "perfect lead-in" to Rexha's third studio album and engages in the "soundscape of the 1970s." Eryn Murphy for Euphoria characterized the song as an original creation and the best preview of the album and responded positively to Rexha's "unmistakable" vocal performance that "elevates the disco-pop feel" of the song. Alex Gonzalez of Uproxx highlighted Rexha's "breezy, pop" vocals and the song's "groovy, disco-inspired" sound that is ready to "hit the dancefloor." Jennifer Machin from Hypebae complimented the song for its catchiness and Rexha for delivering "some serious disco dance vibes." Janet Mfumuzingi for Chérie FM designated the song as a "bold and addictive" title and commented that it showcases a "mature and fulfilled" side of Rexha. Jordi Bardají of Jenesaispop likened the song to British-American band Fleetwood Mac's single "Landslide" (1975) and noted that it "isn't quite as good" as the latter but "gracefully ushers us" into the new era of Rexha.

Commercially, "Heart Wants What It Wants" charted at number 10 in Bulgaria, number 18 in Lebanon, number 38 in Hungary, number 61 in Croatia and number 62 in Poland. The song also peaked in the top 30 on the New Zealand Hot Singles, the US Billboard Adult Top 40 and Mainstream Top 40 rankings, and reached the top 50 on the Canadian CHR/Top 40 and Hot AC charts.

== Music video ==
Snapshot from the music video of "Heart Wants What It Wants" that depicts Bebe Rexha in a retro-themed setting, highlighting the use of vintage filming equipment by a crew member.

To accompany the release, a 1970s and retro-themed music video for "Heart Wants What It Wants" was uploaded to Rexha's official YouTube channel on February 17, 2023. The video was directed by Michael Haussman of Echobend Pictures and aims to display the techniques used in filming production in the past by utilizing vintage filming equipment. It begins with a close-up shot of a rotating vinyl record that displays the song's title, before shifting to Rexha positioned behind a van. As a film crew emerges from the vehicle, they follow Rexha through a wooded area until they arrive at a retro-described setting that is equipped with filming and microphone equipment. There, Rexha changes her outfit and performs the song, interlacing glimpses of the behind-the-scenes process of the video shoot. Later on, she is joined by a male dancer as the song progresses. The video ends with a scene showcasing Rexha on a dancefloor in a darker setting with flashing lights behind her surrounded by a dancing crew creating a festive atmosphere. The prequel to the music video of "Heart Wants What It Wants" premiered to the platform on March 6, showcasing the proceedings of the video with Rexha performing to the song both inside and next to the van.

== Track listing ==
- Digital download and streaming
1. "Heart Wants What It Wants" – 3:02
- Digital download and streaming – Remixes
1. "Heart Wants What It Wants" (MK Remix) – 3:40
2. "Heart Wants What It Wants" (Nicky Romero Remix) – 4:13

== Charts ==
Chart performance
Chart (2023)	Peak position
Bulgaria (PROPHON)	10
Canada CHR/Top 40 (Billboard)	40
Canada Hot AC (Billboard)	49
CIS Airplay (TopHit)	186
Croatia (HRT)	61
Hungary (Rádiós Top 40)	38
Latvia (EHR)	6
Lebanon (Lebanese Top 20)	18
Lithuania Airplay (TopHit)	19
Netherlands (Single Tip)	29
New Zealand Hot Singles (RMNZ)	21
Poland (Polish Airplay Top 100)	62
US Adult Pop Airplay (Billboard)	20
US Pop Airplay (Billboard)	25

== Release history ==
Release dates and formats
Region	Date	Format(s)	Label	Ref.
Various	February 17, 2023	Digital download; streaming	Warner	
France	February 17, 2023	Radio airplay	Warner	
United Kingdom	February 17, 2023	Various	Warner	
United States	March 6, 2023	Adult contemporary radio	Warner	
United States	March 7, 2023	Contemporary hit radio	Warner	
