= I'm Gonna Show You Crazy =

2014 single by Bebe Rexha

Single by Bebe Rexha

from the EP I Don't Wanna Grow Up
- Released: December 19, 2014
- Genre: Pop
- Length: 3:27
- Label: Warner Bros.
- Songwriters: Bebe Rexha; Jon Levine; Lauren Christy
- Producer: Jon Levine

Bebe Rexha singles chronology
| "I Can't Stop Drinking About You" (2014) | "I'm Gonna Show You Crazy" (2014) | "Gone" (2014) |

Music video
- "I'm Gonna Show You Crazy" on YouTube

"I'm Gonna Show You Crazy" is a song by American singer and songwriter Bebe Rexha from her debut extended play, I Don't Wanna Grow Up (2015). The song was written by Rexha, Lauren Christy, and Jon Levine, who also completed the production. It was released as the second single for digital download and streaming by Warner Bros. in various countries on December 19, 2014. A dark and stormy-themed pop song, it is about the theme of self-acceptance, as well as self-love and not changing for anyone else. Commercially, the song reached the top 20 in the Czech Republic, Finland, Norway, and Slovakia, as well as number 30 in Sweden. It was further awarded a gold certification from Music Canada (MC) in Canada, platinum from the Swedish Recording Industry Association (GLF) in Sweden, and fourfold platinum from IFPI Norway in Norway. The accompanying music video was released to Rexha's YouTube channel on April 21, 2015, showcasing the story of the singer as a rebellious misfit in a school.

== Background and composition ==
In early December 2014, Rexha published a demo of a song titled "Cry Wolf" on her Instagram, which was rumored to be the follow-up single to "I Can't Stop Drinking About You" (2014). However, a few days later, the singer released a snippet of "I'm Gonna Show You Crazy" and announced that it would be the next single. The song was written by Rexha, Lauren Christy, and Jon Levine, who also completed the production. It was released for digital download and streaming by Warner on December 19, 2014, as the second single from Rexha's debut extended play I Don't Wanna Grow Up (2015). Musically, "I'm Gonna Show You Crazy" is a dark and stormy pop song, which delves into the theme of self-acceptance, and is about self-love and not changing for anyone else, as Rexha declared, "It's about people making you feel like you're crazy [...] overweight, skinny [...] this race, [...] this religion. We're fighting to be ourselves in a world that's trying to make us like everyone else." Lyrics include: "I'm tired of trying to be normal, I'm always overthinking, I'm driving myself crazy."

== Reception and music video ==
Labeling it a "major tune", Bradley Stern from MuuMuse highlighted the song's music and lyrics, writing: "The Albanian diva's done trying to fix herself on this […] anthem, and the therapist's giving up on her too." While a writer for Columbus Monthly found it as "theatrical" and "anthemic", Jason Lipshutz of Billboard deemed the song as "one of the most angst-y songs on the EP". Commercially, "I'm Gonna Show You Crazy" reached number 17 in Finland and Norway, respectively, as well as number 30 in Sweden. The song also peaked at number 14 in the Czech Republic and number 17 in Slovakia. It was further certified gold by Music Canada (MC) in Canada, platinum by the Swedish Recording Industry Association (GLF) in Sweden and fourfold platinum by IFPI Norway in Norway.

Preceded by the release of an acoustic video in February 2015 and a lyric video in March, the official music video for "I'm Gonna Show You Crazy" was uploaded to Rexha's YouTube channel on April 21. Directed by Hannah Lux Davis, the video showcases the story of Rexha as a rebellious misfit in a school while she refuses to conform to the school's rules after having been sent to a reform school by her judgmental family. The video begins with a group of people having a dinner, during which Rexha arrives too late. The singer then appears in an empty school entrance followed by another scene in a hallway, before she enters her classroom filled with several classmates who sport colorful clothing. As the video progresses, the classmates are lined up in a row while being humiliated by the teacher based on their appearance and clothing. Before it ends, Rexha appears in front of the class with a pointing stick in her hand and directs the group. Idolator's Daw described the video as "highly entertaining" and "rebellious", while MTV's Paoletta wrote that "[it] is an incredibly visually detailed, insightful look at the pressures of being perfect".

== Track listing ==
- Digital download and streaming
1. "I'm Gonna Show You Crazy" – 3:27

== Charts ==
Chart performance for "I'm Gonna Show You Crazy"
| Chart (2014 – 2015) | Peak position |
|---|---|
| Czech Republic Singles Digital (ČNS IFPI) | 14 |
| Finland (Suomen virallinen lista) | 17 |
| Hungary (Stream Top 40) | 24 |
| Norway (VG-lista) | 17 |
| Slovakia Singles Digital (ČNS IFPI) | 17 |
| Sweden (Sverigetopplistan) | 30 |

== Certifications ==
Certifications and sales for "I'm Gonna Show You Crazy"
| Region | Certification | Certified units/sales |
|---|---|---|
| Canada (Music Canada) | Gold | 40,000^{‡} |
| New Zealand (RMNZ) | Gold | 15,000^{‡} |
| Norway (IFPI Norway) | 4× Platinum | 240,000^{‡} |
| Sweden (GLF) | Platinum | 40,000^{‡} |
^{‡} Sales+streaming figures based on certification alone.

== Release history ==
Release dates and formats for "I'm Gonna Show You Crazy"
| Region | Date | Format(s) | Label | Ref. |
|---|---|---|---|---|
| Various | December 19, 2014 | Digital download; streaming | Warner | |
