= Globalization (album) =

Studio album by Pitbull
- Released: November 21, 2014
- Recorded: 2013–2014
- Genre: Pop-rap
- Length: 38:48
- Labels: Mr. 305; Polo Grounds; RCA
- Producers: Alexander Castillo "A.C." Vasquez; Andrew Cedar; Axident; Cirkut; Dr. Luke; DJ Frank E; Jason Evigan; JMIKE; Joe London; John Ryan; Lifted; Max Martin; The Monsters and the Strangerz; One Love; RedOne; Ricky Reed; Thomas Troelsen

Pitbull chronology
| Global Warming (2012) | Globalization (2014) | Dale (2015) |

Singles from Globalization
- 1. "Wild Wild Love" Released: February 25, 2014; 2. "Fireball" Released: July 23, 2014; 3. "Time of Our Lives" Released: November 17, 2014; 4. "Fun" Released: April 21, 2015; 5. "Drive You Crazy" Released: August 21, 2015

Professional ratings
Review scores
| Source | Rating |
|---|---|
| AllMusic | 3/5 stars |
| The Buffalo News | 1/5 stars |
| Los Angeles Times | 3/4 stars |
| Rolling Stone | 3/5 stars |

Globalization is the eighth studio album by American rapper Pitbull. It was released on November 21, 2014 through Mr. 305, Polo Grounds Music, and RCA Records. The production on the album was handled by multiple producers including Dr. Luke, Cirkut, DJ Frank E, The Monsters and the Strangerz and Max Martin. The album also features guest appearances from Sean Paul, Chris Brown, John Ryan, Ne-Yo, Chloe Angelides, Heymous Molly, Jason Derulo, Juicy J, G.R.L., Bebe Rexha, Jennifer Lopez, and Claudia Leitte.

Globalization was supported by five singles: "Wild Wild Love", "Fireball", "Time of Our Lives", "Fun" and "Drive You Crazy". The album received generally mixed reviews from music critics and was a moderate commercial success. It debuted at number 18 on the US Billboard 200 chart, earning 49,000 album-equivalent units in its first week.

== Singles ==
The album was supported by five singles. The first single, "Wild Wild Love" was released as the album's lead single on February 25, 2014. The song features guest appearances from American-British-Canadian girl group G.R.L. The single peaked at number six on the UK; number ten in Australia and number 30 in the United States. The second single, "Fireball" was released on July 23, 2014. The song features guest appearance from John Ryan. It eventually reached at number one in Netherlands; number six in Spain; number nine in Finland and number 23 in the United States. The third single, "Time of Our Lives" featuring Ne-Yo was released on November 17, 2014. The song reached at number seven in Czech Republic, number nine in United States and Norway; number ten in Canada. The fourth single, "Fun" featuring Chris Brown was released on April 21, 2015. The single peaked at number 40 in the United States. The fifth and final single, "Drive You Crazy" featuring Jason Derulo and Juicy J was released on August 21, 2015.

== Other songs ==
"We Are One (Ole Ola)" was released as official single of the official 2014 FIFA World Cup song on April 15, 2014. It features American singer Jennifer Lopez and Brazilian recording artist Claudia Leitte.

"Celebrate" was released on October 18, 2014. It serves as the lead single for the film Penguins of Madagascar and was used in the commercial for the 2016 edition of the CBC's Hockey Day in Canada. The Philadelphia Phillies play the song after every home victory. These songs were also included on "Globalization".

"Sexy Beaches" was used in the "Visit Florida" tourism campaign, sponsored by the state of Florida. The music video was filmed at The Don CeSar in St. Petersburg, Florida, and was uploaded to Pitbull's YouTube channel on July 13, 2016.

== Commercial performance ==
Globalization debuted at number 18 on the US Billboard 200 chart, earning 49,000 album-equivalent units (including 38,000 copies as pure album sales) in its first week. The album also debuted at number three on the US Top Rap Albums chart. As of September 2016, the album has sold 198,000 copies in the US. On September 19, 2025, the album was certified two-times platinum by the Recording Industry Association of America (RIAA) for combined sales and album-equivalent units of over two million units in the United States.

In Canada, the album also debuted at number 16 on the Canadian Albums Chart.

== Track listing ==
| No. | Title | Writer(s) | Producer(s) | Length |
|---|---|---|---|---|
| 1. | "Ah Leke" (featuring Sean Paul) | Armando C. Pérez; Sean Henriques; Breyan Isaac; Jacob Luttrell; Jeremy Coleman; Alex Junior; Paolo Silva; Allan Silva | JMIKE | 3:04 |
| 2. | "Fun" (featuring Chris Brown) | Pérez; Jason Evigan; Clarence Coffee, Jr.; Marcus Lomax; Jordan Johnson; Stefan Johnson; Alexander Izquierdo; Chris Brown; Al Burna | The Monsters and the Strangerz; Evigan | 3:22 |
| 3. | "Fireball" (featuring John Ryan) | Pérez; John Ryan; Andreas Schuller; Eric Frederic; Joe Spargur; Tom Peyton; Ilsey Juber | Ricky Reed; Axident; Ryan; Joe London | 3:56 |
| 4. | "Time of Our Lives" (with Ne-Yo) | Pérez; Lukasz Gottwald; Henry Walter; Shaffer Smith; Stephan Taft | Dr. Luke; Cirkut; Lifted | 3:49 |
| 5. | "Celebrate" (from Penguins of Madagascar) (featuring DJ Frank E) | Pérez; Justin Franks; Isaac; Charlie Puth; Andrew Cedar; Ben Maddahi; Dino Fekaris; Nick Zesses | DJ Frank E; Cedar | 3:12 |
| 6. | "Sexy Beaches" (featuring Chloe Angelides) | Pérez; Gottwald; Walter; Theron Thomas; Timothy Thomas; Michael "Freakin" Everett; Angelides; Al Burna; Springette | Dr. Luke; Cirkut | 3:57 |
| 7. | "Day Drinking" (featuring Heymous Molly) | Pérez; Ryan; Schuller; Frederic; Spargur | Reed; Axident; Ryan; London | 3:08 |
| 8. | "Drive You Crazy" (featuring Jason Derulo and Juicy J) | Pérez; Gottwald; Walter; Jordan Houston; Djibril "Gibson" Kagni; Jordan "TrackStorm" Houyez; Theron Thomas; Timothy Thomas | Dr. Luke; Cirkut | 3:50 |
| 9. | "Wild Wild Love" (featuring G.R.L.) | Pérez; Gottwald; Everett; Max Martin; Ammar Malik; Alexander Vasquez; Walter | Dr. Luke; Max Martin; Cirkut; A.C. | 3:23 |
| 10. | "This Is Not a Drill" (featuring Bebe Rexha) | Jeremy Dussolliet; Tim Sommers; Pérez; Bleta Rexha | One Love | 3:25 |
| 11. | "We Are One (Ole Ola)" (featuring Jennifer Lopez and Claudia Leitte) | Pérez; Thomas Troelsen; Jennifer Lopez; Claudia Leitte; Daniel Murcia; Sia Furler; Nadir Khayat; Gottwald; Walter | RedOne; Dr. Luke; Cirkut; Thomas Troelsen | 3:42 |

Globalization — Japanese edition (bonus tracks)
| No. | Title | Writer(s) | Producer(s) | Length |
|---|---|---|---|---|
| 12. | "Fireball" (featuring John Ryan) (Jump Smokers Remix) | Pérez; Ryan; Schuller; Frederic; Spargur; Peyton; Juber | Reed; Axident; Ryan; London; Jump Smokers^{[a]} | 3:28 |
| 13. | "Fireball" (featuring John Ryan) (DJ Noodles Remix) | Pérez; Ryan; Schuller; Frederic; Spargur; Peyton; Juber | Reed; Axident; Ryan; London; DJ Noodles^{[a]} | 4:28 |

Notes

- ^{^[a]} signifies an additional producer
- "Ah Leke" contains elements of "Passinho do Volante (Ah! Lelek Lek Lek)" performed by MC Federado & Os Leleks, and written by MC Federado.
- "Celebrate" contains elements of "I Just Want to Celebrate" performed by Rare Earth and written by Dino Fekaris and Nick Zesses.
- ”Celebrate” Is Featured In The Movie Penguins of Madagascar

== Charts ==
=== Weekly charts ===
| Chart (2014–2015) | Peak position |
|---|---|
| Australian Albums (ARIA) | 60 |
| Belgian Albums (Ultratop Flanders) | 110 |
| Belgian Albums (Ultratop Wallonia) | 148 |
| Canadian Albums Chart | 15 |
| Danish Albums (Hitlisten) | 25 |
| Finnish Albums (Suomen virallinen lista) | 14 |
| Norwegian Albums (VG-lista) | 15 |
| Spanish Albums (Promusicae) | 90 |
| Swedish Albums (Sverigetopplistan) | 10 |
| Swiss Albums (Schweizer Hitparade) | 34 |
| US Billboard 200 | 18 |
| US Top Rap Albums (Billboard) | 3 |

| Chart (2024–2026) | Peak position |
|---|---|
| Lithuanian Albums (AGATA) | 8 |
| Polish Albums (ZPAV) | 98 |

=== Year-end charts ===
| Chart (2015) | Peak position |
|---|---|
| US Billboard 200 | 43 |
| US Top Rap Albums (Billboard) | 16 |

== Certifications ==
| Region | Certification | Certified units/sales |
|---|---|---|
| Denmark (IFPI Danmark) | 2× Platinum | 40,000^{‡} |
| Hungary (MAHASZ) | Platinum | 2,000^{‡} |
| Italy (FIMI) | Gold | 25,000^{‡} |
| Mexico (AMPROFON) | Gold | 30,000^{‡} |
| New Zealand (RMNZ) | 2× Platinum | 30,000^{‡} |
| Poland (ZPAV) | Gold | 15,000^{‡} |
| Singapore (RIAS) | Gold | 5,000^{*} |
| United Kingdom (BPI) | Silver | 60,000^{‡} |
| United States (RIAA) | 2× Platinum | 2,000,000^{‡} |
^{*} Sales figures based on certification alone.^{‡} Sales+streaming figures based on certification alone.

== Release history ==
| Region | Date | Format(s) | Label(s) |
|---|---|---|---|
| Netherlands | 21 November 2014 | CD; digital download | Mr. 305; Polo Grounds; RCA |
| France | 24 November 2014 | CD; digital download | Mr. 305; Polo Grounds; RCA |
| Germany | 24 November 2014 | CD; digital download | Mr. 305; Polo Grounds; RCA |
| United Kingdom | 24 November 2014 | CD; digital download | Mr. 305; Polo Grounds; RCA |
| United States | 24 November 2014 | CD; digital download | Mr. 305; Polo Grounds; RCA |
| Canada | 25 November 2014 | CD; digital download | Mr. 305; Polo Grounds; RCA |
| Italy | 25 November 2014 | CD; digital download | Mr. 305; Polo Grounds; RCA |
| Spain | 25 November 2014 | CD; digital download | Mr. 305; Polo Grounds; RCA |
| Japan | 26 November 2014 | CD; digital download | Sony |
