= List of awards and nominations received by Bebe Rexha =

Bebe Rexha awards and nominations
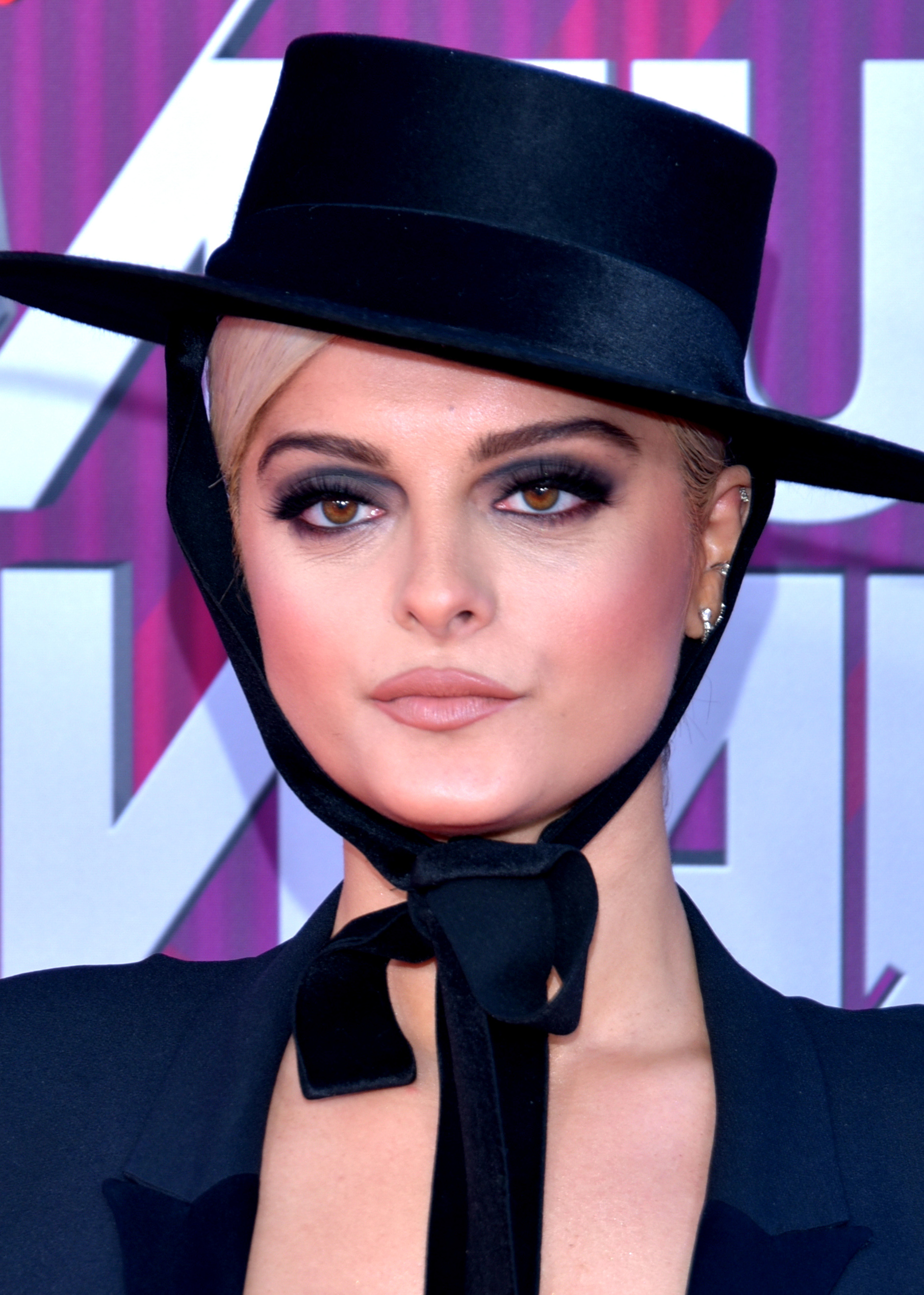
- Rexha in 2019
Awards and nominations (Note: Awards in certain categories do not have prior nominations and only winners are announced by the jury. For simplification and to avoid errors, each award in this list has been presumed to have had a prior nomination.)
Award	Wins	Nominations
Academy of Country Music Awards	1	4
American Music Awards	0	2
APRA Awards	0	3
ARIA Charts	1	1
ASCAP Country Music Awards	1	1
ASCAP London Music Awards	3	3
ASCAP Pop Music Awards	4	4
Billboard Canada Women in Music	1	1
Billboard Music Awards	2	7
BMI Country Awards	1	1
BMI London Awards	4	4
BMI Pop Awards	8	8
BMI R&B/Hip-Hop Awards	3	3
Bravo Otto	0	1
Brit Awards	0	1
Buma Awards	4	4
CelebMix Awards	1	1
Clubbing TV Awards France	3	3
Country Music Association Awards	0	2
CMT Music Awards	0	2
Edison Award	1	1
Electronic Dance Music Awards	3	12
GAFFA Awards (Sweden)	0	1
Global Awards	0	1
Grammy Awards	0	4
Guinness World Records	1	1
Hollywood Music in Media Awards	1	1
Hungarian Music Awards	1	1
iHeartRadio Much Music Video Awards	1	2
iHeartRadio Music Awards	2	8
iHeartRadio Titanium Award	2	2
International Dance Music Awards	1	2
Melty Future Awards	1	1
MPS Online Awards	1	1
MTV Europe Music Awards	1	8
MTV Video Music Awards	1	7
MTV Video Play Awards	1	1
Music Business Association	1	1
Nashville Songwriter Awards	2	2
National Academy of Recording Arts & Sciences	1	1
Nickelodeon Kids' Choice Awards	0	1
NMPA Songwriting Awards	1	1
NRJ Music Awards	0	3
NRJ DJ Awards	1	1
Official Charts Company	1	1
People's Choice Country Awards	0	1
Radio Disney Music Awards	2	3
SOCAN Awards	1	1
Songwriters Hall of Fame	1	1
Spotify Plaques	5	5
Teen Choice Awards	1	4
Variety Hitmakers Awards	1	1
WDM Radio Awards	0	2
Webby Awards	1	1
YouTube Creator Awards	2	2
- Totals
Awards won	76
Nominations	133

American singer and songwriter Bebe Rexha won her first award for songwriting when she was a teenager. She submitted a song to be performed at the National Academy of Recording Arts & Sciences' annual "Grammy Day" event and surpassed 700 other entrants, earning the "Best Teen Songwriter" award. In 2010, she became the lead vocalist for the Black Cards, an experimental electro-music band formed by Fall Out Boy bassist Pete Wentz, and was eventually awarded the Abe Olman Scholarship in 2012 for her songwriting contributions during that time.

Rexha subsequently established herself as a songwriter in the music industry, receiving recognition from the ASCAP and BMI, with 8 ASCAP Awards and 16 BMI Awards across their Pop, Country, R&B/Hip-Hop and London music-award galas. Her BMI accolades included two Song of the Year awards: one for "Meant to Be" at the 2019 BMI Pop Awards and another for "Me, Myself & I" at the 2017 BMI R&B/Hip-Hop Awards. Her songwriting achievements have also been recognized by the NMPA Songwriting Awards and the Nashville Songwriter Awards. In late 2018, she was named Songwriter of the Year at the Variety Hitmakers Awards, recognizing her contributions to the music industry as a songwriter.

As a recording artist, Rexha has received four Grammy Awards nominations, including Best New Artist at the 2019 ceremony, and won two Billboard Music Awards, two iHeartRadio Music Awards, one MTV Video Music Award and one MTV Europe Music Award. She also won the Academy of Country Music Award for Music Event of the Decade alongside Florida Georgia Line for "Meant to Be". The song spent 50 consecutive weeks at number one on Billboard's Hot Country Songs chart, earning Rexha and Florida Georgia Line a Guinness World Record for the most consecutive weeks at number one on the chart. In 2025, Billboard ranked "Meant to Be" number one on its Top Hot Country Songs of the 21st Century chart. She received the Key to the City of Tirana, the capital of Albania, from then-mayor Erion Veliaj at Tirana City Hall. Rexha was also honored with the Female Icon Award at the 2026 Electronic Dance Music Awards, in recognition of her influence and contributions to dance music. She will receive the Global Hitmaker Award at Billboard Canada Women in Music on November 24, 2026, in recognition of her decade-spanning career as a songwriter and her success across pop, electronic, country and R&B, as well as her ability to create songs that resonate with broad audiences.

== Awards and nominations ==
Name of the award ceremony, year presented, category, nominee(s) of the award, and the result of the nomination
Award ceremony	Year	Category	Nominee(s)/work(s)	Result	Ref.
Academy of Country Music Awards	2019	Music Event of the Year	"Meant to Be" (with Florida Georgia Line)	Nominated	
Academy of Country Music Awards	2019	Single of the Year	"Meant to Be" (with Florida Georgia Line)	Nominated	
Academy of Country Music Awards	2019	Song of the Year	"Meant to Be" (with Florida Georgia Line)	Nominated	
Academy of Country Music Awards	2019	Music Event of the Decade	"Meant to Be" (with Florida Georgia Line)	Won	
American Music Awards	2018	Collaboration of the Year	"Meant to Be" (with Florida Georgia Line)	Nominated	
American Music Awards	2018	Favorite Country Song	"Meant to Be" (with Florida Georgia Line)	Nominated	
APRA Awards	2015	Most Performed International Work	"The Monster"	Nominated	
APRA Awards	2019	Most Performed International Work	"Meant to Be" (with Florida Georgia Line)	Nominated	
APRA Awards	2024	Most Performed International Work	"I'm Good (Blue)" (with David Guetta)	Nominated	
ARIA Charts	2022	ARIA #1 Single Chart Award	"I'm Good (Blue)" (with David Guetta)	Won	
ASCAP Country Music Awards	2019	Winning Songwriters	"Meant to Be"	Won	
ASCAP London Music Awards	2017	Winning Songwriters	"Me, Myself & I"	Won	
ASCAP London Music Awards	2017	Winning Hot 100 Songs	"Me, Myself & I"	Won	
ASCAP London Music Awards	2020	EDM Song Award	"Call You Mine"	Won	
ASCAP Pop Music Awards	2016	Winning Songwriters	"Hey Mama"	Won	
ASCAP Pop Music Awards	2017	Winning Songwriters	"Me, Myself & I"	Won	
ASCAP Pop Music Awards	2019	Winning Songwriters	"Meant to Be"	Won	
ASCAP Pop Music Awards	2023	Winning Songwriters	"I'm Good (Blue)"	Won	
Billboard Canada Women in Music	2026	Global Hitmaker Award	Herself	Won	
Billboard Music Awards	2016	Top Dance/Electronic Song	"Hey Mama" (with David Guetta, Nicki Minaj and Afrojack)	Nominated	
Billboard Music Awards	2018	Top Country Song	"Meant to Be" (with Florida Georgia Line)	Nominated	
Billboard Music Awards	2019	Top Country Song	"Meant to Be" (with Florida Georgia Line)	Won	
Billboard Music Awards	2019	Top Radio Song	"Meant to Be" (with Florida Georgia Line)	Nominated	
Billboard Music Awards	2023	Top Billboard Global 200 (Excl. U.S.) Song	"I'm Good (Blue)" (with David Guetta)	Nominated	
Billboard Music Awards	2023	Top Collaboration	"I'm Good (Blue)" (with David Guetta)	Nominated	
Billboard Music Awards	2023	Top Dance/Electronic Song	"I'm Good (Blue)" (with David Guetta)	Won	
BMI Country Awards	2018	Award-Winning Songs	"Meant to Be"	Won	
BMI London Awards	2016	Award-Winning Songs	"Hey Mama"	Won	
BMI London Awards	2016	Dance Song Award	"Hey Mama"	Won	
BMI London Awards	2017	Award-Winning Songs	"Me, Myself & I"	Won	
BMI London Awards	2023	Award-Winning Songs	"I'm Good (Blue)"	Won	
BMI Pop Awards	2015	Award-Winning Songs	"The Monster"	Won	
BMI Pop Awards	2016	Award-Winning Songs	"Hey Mama"	Won	
BMI Pop Awards	2017	Award-Winning Songs	"Me, Myself & I"	Won	
BMI Pop Awards	2018	Award-Winning Songs	"In the Name of Love"	Won	
BMI Pop Awards	2019	Award-Winning Songs	"Meant to Be"	Won	
BMI Pop Awards	2019	Song of the Year	"Meant to Be"	Won	
BMI Pop Awards	2020	Award-Winning Songs	"I'm a Mess"	Won	
BMI Pop Awards	2024	Award-Winning Songs	"I'm Good (Blue)"	Won	
BMI R&B/Hip-Hop Awards	2014	Award-Winning Songs	"The Monster"	Won	
BMI R&B/Hip-Hop Awards	2017	Award-Winning Songs	"Me, Myself & I"	Won	
BMI R&B/Hip-Hop Awards	2017	Song of the Year	"Me, Myself & I"	Won	
Bravo Otto	2016	Super Female Singer	Herself	Nominated	
Brit Award	2023	Best International Song	"I'm Good (Blue)" (with David Guetta)	Nominated	
Buma Awards	2015	Buma Award International	"Hey Mama" (with David Guetta, Nicki Minaj and Afrojack)	Won	
Buma Awards	2016	Buma Award International	"In the Name of Love" (with Martin Garrix)	Won	
Buma Awards	2016	Buma Award National	"In the Name of Love" (with Martin Garrix)	Won	
Buma Awards	2019	Buma Award International	"Say My Name" (with David Guetta & J Balvin)	Won	
CelebMix Awards	2017	Best Collaboration	"Back to You" (with Louis Tomlinson & Digital Farm Animals)	Won	
Clubbing TV Awards France	2023	Best Essentials	"In the Name of Love" (with Martin Garrix)	Won	
Clubbing TV Awards France	2023	Best Highlight of the Week	"I'm Good (Blue)" (with David Guetta)	Won	
Clubbing TV Awards France	2024	Best Hit Music Video	"One in a Million" (with David Guetta)	Won	
Country Music Association Awards	2018	Musical Event of the Year	"Meant to Be" (with Florida Georgia Line)	Nominated	
Country Music Association Awards	2018	Single of the Year	"Meant to Be" (with Florida Georgia Line)	Nominated	
CMT Music Awards	2018	Collaborative Video of the Year	"Meant to Be" (with Florida Georgia Line)	Nominated	
CMT Music Awards	2018	Video of the Year	"Meant to Be" (with Florida Georgia Line)	Nominated	
Edison Award	2017	Best Song	"In the Name of Love" (with Martin Garrix)	Won	
Electronic Dance Music Awards	2023	Best Use of Sample	"I'm Good (Blue)" (with David Guetta)	Won	
Electronic Dance Music Awards	2023	Dance Song of the Year (Radio)	"I'm Good (Blue)" (with David Guetta)	Won	
Electronic Dance Music Awards	2023	Music Video of the Year	"I'm Good (Blue)" (with David Guetta)	Nominated	
Electronic Dance Music Awards	2023	Best Vocalist	Herself	Nominated	
Electronic Dance Music Awards	2024	Best Collaboration	"If Only I" (with Loud Luxury & Two Friends)	Nominated	
Electronic Dance Music Awards	2024	Dance/Electro Pop Song of the Year	"If Only I" (with Loud Luxury & Two Friends)	Nominated	
Electronic Dance Music Awards	2024	Dance Radio Song of the Year	"If Only I" (with Loud Luxury & Two Friends)	Nominated	
Electronic Dance Music Awards	2024	Music Video of the Year	"If Only I" (with Loud Luxury & Two Friends)	Nominated	
Electronic Dance Music Awards	2025	Dance Radio Song of the Year	"I'm The Drama"	Nominated	
Electronic Dance Music Awards	2025	Music Video of the Year	"I'm The Drama"	Nominated	
Electronic Dance Music Awards	2026	Female Icon Award	Herself	Won	
Electronic Dance Music Awards	2026	DNB Song of the Year	"Light That Leads Me" (with Netsky)	Nominated	
GAFFA Awards	2019	Best Foreign New Act	Herself	Nominated	
Global Awards	2023	Best Social Trended Song	"I'm Good (Blue)" (with David Guetta)	Nominated	
Grammy Awards	2019	Best Country Duo/Group Performance	"Meant to Be" (with Florida Georgia Line)	Nominated	
Grammy Awards	2019	Best New Artist	Herself	Nominated	
Grammy Awards	2023	Best Dance/Electronic Recording	"I'm Good (Blue)" (with David Guetta)	Nominated	
Grammy Awards	2024	Best Pop Dance Recording	"One in a Million" (with David Guetta)	Nominated	
Guinness World Records	2018	Most weeks at No.1 on the US Hot Country Songs chart	Herself	Won	
Hollywood Music in Media Awards	2019	Original Song - Animated Film	Beautiful Life (from the Abominable Movie Soundtrack)	Won	
Hungarian Music Awards	2023	Foreign Electronic Music Album or Voice Recording	"I'm Good (Blue)" (with David Guetta)	Won	
iHeartRadio Much Music Video Awards	2018	Best Collaboration	"Meant to Be" (with Florida Georgia Line)	Won	
iHeartRadio Much Music Video Awards	2018	Song of the Summer	"Meant to Be" (with Florida Georgia Line)	Nominated	
iHeartRadio Music Awards	2016	Dance Song of the Year	"Hey Mama" (with David Guetta, Nicki Minaj and Afrojack)	Nominated	
iHeartRadio Music Awards	2018	Cutest Musician's Pet	Bear Rexha	Nominated	
iHeartRadio Music Awards	2019	Country Song of the Year	"Meant to Be" (with Florida Georgia Line)	Won	
iHeartRadio Music Awards	2019	Best Collaboration	"Meant to Be" (with Florida Georgia Line)	Nominated	
iHeartRadio Music Awards	2023	Dance Song of the Year	"I'm Good (Blue)" (with David Guetta)	Won	
iHeartRadio Music Awards	2023	Favorite Song Sampled	"I'm Good (Blue)" (with David Guetta)	Nominated	
iHeartRadio Music Awards	2024	Best Music Video	"I'm Good (Blue)" (with David Guetta)	Nominated	
iHeartRadio Music Awards	2025	Dance Song of the Year	"Chase It (Mmm Da Da Da)"	Nominated	
iHeartRadio Titanium Award	2019	1 Billion Total Audience Spins on iHeartRadio Stations	"Meant to Be" (with Florida Georgia Line)	Won	
iHeartRadio Titanium Award	2025	1 Billion Total Audience Spins on iHeartRadio Stations	"I'm Good (Blue)" (with David Guetta)	Won	
International Dance Music Awards	2016	Best Rap/Hip Hop/Trap Dance Track	"Hey Mama" (with David Guetta, Nicki Minaj and Afrojack)	Won	
International Dance Music Awards	2016	Best R&B/Urban Dance Track	"Hey Mama" (with David Guetta, Nicki Minaj and Afrojack)	Nominated	
Melty Future Awards	2017	Female Coming Soon	Herself	Won	
MPS Online Awards	2018	Favorite Collaboration	"Back to You" (with Louis Tomlinson & Digital Farm Animals)	Won	
MTV Europe Music Awards	2015	Best Collaboration	"Hey Mama" (with David Guetta, Nicki Minaj and Afrojack)	Nominated	
MTV Europe Music Awards	2016	Best Look	Herself	Nominated	
MTV Europe Music Awards	2016	Best New Act	Herself	Nominated	
MTV Europe Music Awards	2016	Best Push Act	Herself	Nominated	
MTV Europe Music Awards	2018	Best Song	"Meant to Be" (with Florida Georgia Line)	Nominated	
MTV Europe Music Awards	2019	Best Collaboration	"Call You Mine" (with The Chainsmokers)	Nominated	
MTV Europe Music Awards	2019	Best World Stage	Herself (Isle of MTV Malta 2019)	Nominated	
MTV Europe Music Awards	2022	Best Collaboration	"I'm Good (Blue)" (with David Guetta)	Won	
MTV Video Music Awards	2015	Song of Summer	"Hey Mama" (with David Guetta, Nicki Minaj and Afrojack)	Nominated	
MTV Video Music Awards	2018	Best Collaboration	"Meant to Be" (with Florida Georgia Line)	Nominated	
MTV Video Music Awards	2019	Best Dance	"Call You Mine" (with The Chainsmokers)	Won	
MTV Video Music Awards	2019	Best Dance	"Say My Name" (with David Guetta & J Balvin)	Nominated	
MTV Video Music Awards	2019	Song of Summer	"Call You Mine" (with The Chainsmokers)	Nominated	
MTV Video Music Awards	2023	Best Collaboration	"I'm Good (Blue)" (with David Guetta)	Nominated	
MTV Video Music Awards	2026	Best Dance	"New Religion" (with Faithless)	Pending	
MTV Video Play Awards	2023	Winning Video	"I'm Good (Blue)" (with David Guetta)	Won	
Music Business Association	2019	Breakthrough Artist Award	Herself	Won	
Nashville Songwriter Awards	2018	#1 Award	"Meant to Be" (with Florida Georgia Line)	Won	
Nashville Songwriter Awards	2019	Ten Songs I Wish I'd Written Award	"Meant to Be" (with Florida Georgia Line)	Won	
National Academy of Recording Arts & Sciences	2004	Best Teen Songwriter	Herself	Won	
Nickelodeon Kids' Choice Awards	2019	Favorite Collaboration	"Meant to Be" (with Florida Georgia Line)	Nominated	
NMPA Songwriting Awards	2018	Platinum Anthem of the Year	"Meant to Be" (with Florida Georgia Line)	Won	
NRJ Music Awards	2015	Video of the Year	"Hey Mama" (with David Guetta, Nicki Minaj and Afrojack)	Nominated	
NRJ Music Awards	2022	International Song of the Year	"I'm Good (Blue)" (with David Guetta)	Nominated	
NRJ Music Awards	2022	Recovery / Adaptation	"I'm Good (Blue)" (with David Guetta)	Nominated	
NRJ Music Awards	2026	International Female Artist of the Year	Herself	Pending	
NRJ DJ Awards	2019	Single Dance/Electro of the Year	"Say My Name" (with David Guetta & J Balvin)	Won	
Official Charts Company	2022	Official Number 1 single award	"I'm Good (Blue)" (with David Guetta)	Won	
People's Choice Country Awards	2023	The Crossover Song of 2023	"Seasons" (with Dolly Parton)	Nominated	
Radio Disney Music Awards	2018	Best New Artist	Herself	Won	
Radio Disney Music Awards	2018	Country Favorite Song	"Meant to Be" (with Florida Georgia Line)	Won	
Radio Disney Music Awards	2018	Best Collaboration	"Meant to Be" (with Florida Georgia Line)	Nominated	
SOCAN Awards	2024	Dance Music Award	"If Only I" (with Loud Luxury & Two Friends)	Won	
Songwriters Hall of Fame	2012	Abe Olman Scholarship	Herself	Won	
Spotify Plaques	2021	1 Billion Streams	"In the Name of Love" (with Martin Garrix)	Won	
Spotify Plaques	2021	1 Billion Streams	"Meant to Be" (with Florida Georgia Line)	Won	
Spotify Plaques	2021	1 Billion Streams	"Me, Myself & I" (with G-Eazy)	Won	
Spotify Plaques	2023	1 Billion Streams	"I'm Good (Blue)" (with David Guetta)	Won	
Spotify Plaques	2026	1 Billion Streams	"Hey Mama" (with David Guetta, Nicki Minaj & Afrojack)	Won	
Teen Choice Awards	2015	Choice Collaboration	"Hey Mama" (with David Guetta, Nicki Minaj and Afrojack)	Nominated	
Teen Choice Awards	2018	Choice Country Song	"Meant to Be" (with Florida Georgia Line)	Won	
Teen Choice Awards	2018	Choice Collaboration	"Meant to Be" (with Florida Georgia Line)	Nominated	
Teen Choice Awards	2019	Choice Electronic/Dance Song	"Call You Mine" (with The Chainsmokers)	Nominated	
Variety Hitmakers Awards	2018	Songwriter of the Year	Herself	Won	
WDM Radio Awards	2017	Best Global Track	"In the Name of Love" (with Martin Garrix)	Nominated	
WDM Radio Awards	2018	Best Electronic Vocalist	Herself	Nominated	
Webby Awards	2024	Best AI, Metaverse & Virtual	Herself "(Bebeverse)"	Won	
YouTube Creator Awards	2015	Silver Creator Award	Herself	Won	
YouTube Creator Awards	2017	Gold Creator Award	Herself	Won	

== Other accolades ==
=== State and cultural honors ===
Name of country, year given, and name of honor
Country	Year	Honor	Ref.
Albania	2016	Key to the City of Tirana, Albania	

=== Listicles ===
Name of publisher, name of listicle, year(s) listed, and placement result
Publisher	Listicle	Year(s)	Result	Ref.
Apple Music	The 500 most streamed songs in Apple Music history.	2025	148th (Meant to Be)	
Apple Music	The 500 most streamed songs in Apple Music history.	2025	495th (Me, Myself & I)	
Billboard	The 20 Best Country Songs of 2018	2018	11th (Meant to Be)	
Billboard	The 35 Best Country Songs of the 2010s	2019	31st (Meant to Be)	
Billboard	The 30 Best Dance Tracks of 2023	2023	Placed (One in a Million)	
Billboard	The 25 Best Music Videos of 2020	2020	17th (Baby, I'm Jealous)	
Billboard	The 30 Best Pop Songs of 2020	2020	Placed (Baby, I'm Jealous)	
Billboard	The 100 Best Songs of 2018	2018	85th (I'm a Mess)	
Billboard	The 100 Best Songs of 2023	2023	69th (I'm Good (Blue))	
Billboard	Top Hot Country Songs of the 21st Century	2025	1st (Meant to Be)	
Billboard	Top 100 Women Artists of the 21st Century	2025	90th	
Billboard	Songs That Defined the Decade	2019	Placed (Meant to Be)	
BuzzFeed	20 Best Songs of 2026 (Midyear)	2026	15th (Sad Girls)	
BuzzFeed	28 Underrated Musical Artists You Should Be Listening To Right Now	2015	12th	
BuzzFeed	Best Underrated Songs of 2023	2023	6th (One in a Million)	
Forbes	30 Under 30	2018	Placed	
Music Mayhem Magazine	Female of the Year	2018	Placed	
Pandora	Top Thumbed-Up Songs of the Decade	2019	69th (Me, Myself & I)	
Pandora	Top Thumbed-Up Songs of the Year	2015	62nd (Hey Mama)	
Pandora	Top Thumbed-Up Songs of the Year	2016	6th (Me, Myself & I)	
Pandora	Top Thumbed-Up Songs of the Year	2017	98th (I Got You)	
Pandora	Top Thumbed-Up Songs of the Year	2018	79th (I'm a Mess)	
Pandora	Top Thumbed-Up Songs of the Year	2018	98th (Home)	
Pandora	Top Thumbed-Up Songs of the Year	2022	40th (I'm Good (Blue))	
Parade	The 101 Best Country Songs of all time	2023	98th (Meant to Be)	
People	Top 10 Best Albums of 2023	2023	10th (Bebe)	
Rolling Stone	Top 10 Best Country Collaborations of 2018	2018	Placed (Meant to Be)	
Rolling Stone	The Best 100 Albums of 2023	2023	77th (Bebe)	
Rolling Stone	The Best Songs of 2023 (Midyear)	2023	Placed (I'm Not High, I'm In Love)	
Victoria's Secret What is Sexy	Sexiest Rising Songstress	2017	Won	

=== Other records ===
Record	Year	Record holder	Ref.
First American Pop Star to debut at Tomorrowland	2026	Bebe Rexha	
First and Only Artist With 50-Week #1s on Both the Billboard Hot Country & Dance/Electronic Charts. (Note: With Meant to Be 50 weeks and I'm Good (Blue) with 55 weeks at number one respectively.)	2023	Bebe Rexha	
First Female Artist to Debut at #1 on the Billboard Hot Country Songs chart. (Note: With Meant to Be in 2017.)	2017	Bebe Rexha	
Longest-charting Female Artist on the Billboard Hot Dance/Electronic Songs chart. (Note: With 381 weeks on the chart.)	2024	Bebe Rexha	
Longest-running Female Artist atop the Billboard Hot Country Songs chart. (Note: With 50 weeks at number one.)	2018	Bebe Rexha	
Longest-running Female Artist atop the Billboard Hot Dance/Electronic Songs chart. (Note: With 66 weeks at number one.)	2023	Bebe Rexha	
Longest-running Female Song atop the Billboard Hot Dance/Electronic Songs chart. (Note: With 55 weeks at number one.)	2023	"I'm Good (Blue)"	
Longest-running Song atop the Billboard Hot Country Songs chart. (Note: With 50 weeks at number one.)	2018	"Meant to Be"	
Most-streamed Country Song of all-time on Spotify history. (Note: With over 1.4 billion streams.)	2020	"Meant to Be"	
Most-streamed Country Song of all-time in the United Kingdom. (Note: With over 175 million streams.)	2024	"Meant to Be"	
