= Beautiful People (David Guetta and Sia song) =

2025 single by David Guetta and Sia

Single by David Guetta and Sia
- Written: 2012–2013
- Released: 7 March 2025
- Recorded: 2013–2025
- Length: 3:08
- Label: What a Music; Warner
- Songwriters: David Guetta; Mikkel Storleer Eriksen; Tor Erik Hermansen; Timofey Reznikov; Sia Furler
- Producers: David Guetta; Timofey Reznikov; Stargate

David Guetta singles chronology
| "Shout" (2025) | "Beautiful People" (2025) | "Cuentale" (2025) |

Sia singles chronology
| "Solsbury Hill" (2025) | "Beautiful People" (2025) | "Perfect" (Remix) (2025) |

Music video
- "Beautiful People" on YouTube

"Beautiful People" is a song by French DJ and record producer David Guetta and Australian singer-songwriter Sia. The song was released on 7 March 2025 by What a Music. It was written by Sia, Guetta, Stargate and Timofey Reznikov, with production handled by the latter three.

At the APRA Music Awards of 2026, the song was shortlisted for Song of the Year. It was nominated for Most Performed Dance/Electronic Work.

== Background and release ==
"Beautiful People" is Guetta and Sia's ninth official collaboration, and first since "Floating Through Space" (2021). A demo of the song first leaked in 2013 and Guetta premiered the leaked demo at a show in Bangkok.

When asked in 2013 if Guetta had produced the song, Sia tweeted:

Beautiful People is not David Guetta, it was merely a demo I wrote for a pop artist. It's now become a waste of a day's work, as it's leaked!

— Sia on Twitter

== Music video ==
The music video was directed by Daniel Askill and choreographed by Jacob Jonas. It was released on 13 March 2025. The video showing thirteen dancers with their interpretive dance that expresses being 'beautiful people'. It was filmed at City Market of Los Angeles.

== Live performance ==
On 29 March 2025, Sia and Guetta made a surprise appearance during Afrojack's set for the 25th anniversary of Ultra Music Festival in Miami, Florida, where they performed "Beautiful People".

== Track listings ==
- Digital download and streaming
1. "Beautiful People" – 3:07
2. "Beautiful People" (extended) – 4:20
- Digital download and streaming – Cassö remix
1. "Beautiful People" (Cassö remix) – 3:01
2. "Beautiful People" (Cassö remix extended) – 4:43
- Digital download and streaming – Just_us remix
1. "Beautiful People" (Just_us remix) – 3:25
2. "Beautiful People" (Just_us remix extended) – 4:14
- Digital download and streaming – Raffi Saint remix
1. "Beautiful People" (Raffi Saint remix) – 3:23
2. "Beautiful People" (Raffi Saint remix extended) – 4:19
- Digital download and streaming – Seth Hills remix
1. "Beautiful People" (Seth Hills remix) – 3:52
2. "Beautiful People" (Seth Hills remix extended) – 5:04
- Digital download and streaming – KAAZE remix
1. "Beautiful People" (KAAZE remix) – 3:29
2. "Beautiful People" (KAAZE remix extended) – 4:34
- Digital download and streaming – Afrojack & Amél remix
1. "Beautiful People" (Afrojack & Amél remix) – 3:28
2. "Beautiful People" (Afrojack & Amél remix extended) – 4:27
- Digital download and streaming – D.O.D remix
1. "Beautiful People" (D.O.D remix) – 3:00
2. "Beautiful People" (D.O.D remix extended) – 5:05
- Digital download and streaming – THEMBA remix
1. "Beautiful People" (THEMBA remix) – 3:45
2. "Beautiful People" (THEMBA remix extended) – 5:33
- Digital download and streaming – Miss Monique remix
1. "Beautiful People" (Miss Monique remix) – 2:39
2. "Beautiful People" (Miss Monique remix extended) – 4:10

== Personnel ==
- David Guetta – production, synthesiser, songwriting, drum machine, programming
- Sia Furler – lead vocals, songwriting
- Stargate – production, keyboards, songwriting, programming
- Timofey Reznikov – production, synthesiser, drum machine, programming, mastering, songwriting, mixing

== Charts ==
=== Weekly charts ===
Weekly streaming-and-sales chart performance for "Beautiful People"
| Chart (2025) | Peak position |
|---|---|
| Australian Artist (ARIA) | 18 |
| Austria (Ö3 Austria Top 40) | 73 |
| Belgium (Ultratop 50 Flanders) | 8 |
| Belgium (Ultratop 50 Wallonia) | 4 |
| France (SNEP) | 42 |
| Germany (GfK) | 34 |
| Global Excl. US (Billboard) | 185 |
| Ireland (IRMA) | 74 |
| Japan Hot Overseas (Billboard Japan) | 17 |
| Luxembourg (Billboard) | 20 |
| Netherlands (Dutch Top 40) | 4 |
| Netherlands (Single Top 100) | 21 |
| New Zealand Hot Singles (RMNZ) | 14 |
| Poland (Polish Streaming Top 100) | 36 |
| Slovakia Singles Digital (ČNS IFPI) | 99 |
| Suriname (Nationale Top 40) | 17 |
| Sweden Heatseeker (Sverigetopplistan) | 6 |
| Switzerland (Schweizer Hitparade) | 19 |
| UK Singles (Official Charts) | 55 |
| UK Dance (Official Charts) | 8 |
| US Hot Dance/Electronic Songs (Billboard) | 8 |

Weekly airplay chart performance for "Beautiful People"
| Chart (2025) | Peak position |
|---|---|
| Belarus Airplay (TopHit) | 37 |
| Bolivia Anglo Airplay (Monitor Latino) | 6 |
| Bulgaria Airplay (PROPHON) | 5 |
| Central America Anglo Airplay (Monitor Latino) | 7 |
| CIS Airplay (TopHit) | 1 |
| Croatia International Airplay (Top lista) | 3 |
| Czech Republic Airplay (ČNS IFPI) | 15 |
| Ecuador Anglo Airplay (Monitor Latino) | 11 |
| Estonia Airplay (TopHit) | 17 |
| Finland Airplay (Radiosoittolista) | 11 |
| Honduras Anglo Airplay (Monitor Latino) | 1 |
| Honduras Anglo Airplay (Monitor Latino) Miss Monique Remix | 8 |
| Hungary (Rádiós Top 40) | 1 |
| Kazakhstan Airplay (TopHit) | 9 |
| Latvia Airplay (LaIPA) | 1 |
| Lithuania Airplay (TopHit) | 25 |
| Malta Airplay (Radiomonitor) | 2 |
| Mexico Anglo Airplay (Monitor Latino) | 10 |
| Moldova Airplay (TopHit) | 14 |
| Nicaragua Anglo Airplay (Monitor Latino) | 10 |
| North Macedonia Airplay (Radiomonitor) | 1 |
| Paraguay Anglo Airplay (Monitor Latino) | 10 |
| Peru Anglo Airplay (Monitor Latino) | 10 |
| Poland Airplay (OLiS) | 3 |
| Romania Airplay (UPFR) | 9 |
| Romania Airplay (Media Forest) | 4 |
| Russia Airplay (TopHit) | 1 |
| San Marino Airplay (SMRTV Top 50) | 31 |
| Serbia Airplay (Radiomonitor) | 1 |
| Slovakia Airplay (ČNS IFPI) | 1 |
| Slovenia Airplay (Radiomonitor) | 10 |
| Switzerland Airplay (IFPI) | 2 |
| Turkey International Airplay (Radiomonitor Türkiye) | 1 |
| Ukraine Airplay (TopHit) | 3 |
| Venezuela Airplay (Record Report) | 74 |

=== Monthly charts ===
Monthly chart performance for "Beautiful People"
| Chart (2025) | Position |
|---|---|
| Belarus Airplay (TopHit) | 42 |
| CIS Airplay (TopHit) | 2 |
| Estonia Airplay (TopHit) | 21 |
| Kazakhstan Airplay (TopHit) | 13 |
| Latvia Airplay (TopHit) | 19 |
| Lithuania Airplay (TopHit) | 26 |
| Moldova Airplay (TopHit) | 16 |
| Romania Airplay (TopHit) | 12 |
| Russia Airplay (TopHit) | 2 |
| Ukraine Airplay (TopHit) | 3 |

=== Year-end charts ===
Year-end chart performance for "Beautiful People"
| Chart (2025) | Position |
|---|---|
| Belarus Airplay (TopHit) | 115 |
| Belgium (Ultratop 50 Flanders) | 14 |
| Belgium (Ultratop 50 Wallonia) | 24 |
| CIS Airplay (TopHit) | 11 |
| Estonia Airplay (TopHit) | 128 |
| France (SNEP) | 122 |
| Germany (GfK) | 49 |
| Hungary (Rádiós Top 40) | 26 |
| Kazakhstan Airplay (TopHit) | 134 |
| Latvia Airplay (TopHit) | 35 |
| Lithuania Airplay (TopHit) | 50 |
| Moldova Airplay (TopHit) | 23 |
| Netherlands (Dutch Top 40) | 5 |
| Netherlands (Single Top 100) | 38 |
| Poland (Polish Airplay Top 100) | 22 |
| Romania Airplay (TopHit) | 38 |
| Russia Airplay (TopHit) | 17 |
| Switzerland (Schweizer Hitparade) | 48 |
| US Hot Dance/Electronic Songs (Billboard) | 20 |

== Certifications ==
Certifications for "Beautiful People"
| Region | Certification | Certified units/sales |
|---|---|---|
| France (SNEP) | Platinum | 200,000^{‡} |
| Poland (ZPAV) | Platinum | 125,000^{‡} |
| Spain (Promusicae) | Gold | 50,000^{‡} |
| United Kingdom (BPI) | Silver | 200,000^{‡} |
^{‡} Sales+streaming figures based on certification alone.
