= Dirty Blonde (album) =

- Standard cover

Studio album by Bebe Rexha
- Released: June 12, 2026
- Recorded: c. February 2024 – 2026
- Genres: EDM, dance-pop, pop, hip-hop
- Length: 33:40
- Languages: English; Albanian
- Label: Empire
- Producers: Jean Baptiste; Karl Rubin; Ryan "DJ Replay" Buendia; Daniel Cullen; Bebe Rexha; Punctual; Victor Thell; Lil' Eddie; Nitti; DVNCY; Boaz van de Beatz; Shift K3y; Neave Applebaum; Hit-Boy; Dr. Jesse Blum; DJ Snake; Rockywhereyoubeen; Vlado; Yakob; Rico Love; Tushar Apte; Mitch Allan; Franco Ferruzo; Johnny Goldstein; SkipOnDaBeat; Almando Cresso; Will Grands; David Guetta; Timofey Reznikov; Osrin; A Strut

Bebe Rexha chronology
Bebe (2023)	Dirty Blonde (2026)

Singles from Dirty Blonde
- 1. "New Religion" Released: March 6, 2026; 2. "Sad Girls" Released: May 29, 2026; 3. "One Day" Released: September 25, 2026

Dirty Blonde is the fourth studio album by American singer and songwriter Bebe Rexha. It was released on June 12, 2026, through Empire Distribution. Marketed as a visual album, the album incorporates genres including pop, EDM, hip-hop, and country.

Three promotional singles were released from Dirty Blonde, including "I Like You Better Than Me", "Çike Çike" and "Hysteria", while three radio singles including "New Religion" with English dance band Faithless, "Sad Girls" with David Guetta and "One Day", supported the album. Commercially, Dirty Blonde reached number 43 on the Billboard 200, and the top forty in Australia and Scotland.

== Development ==
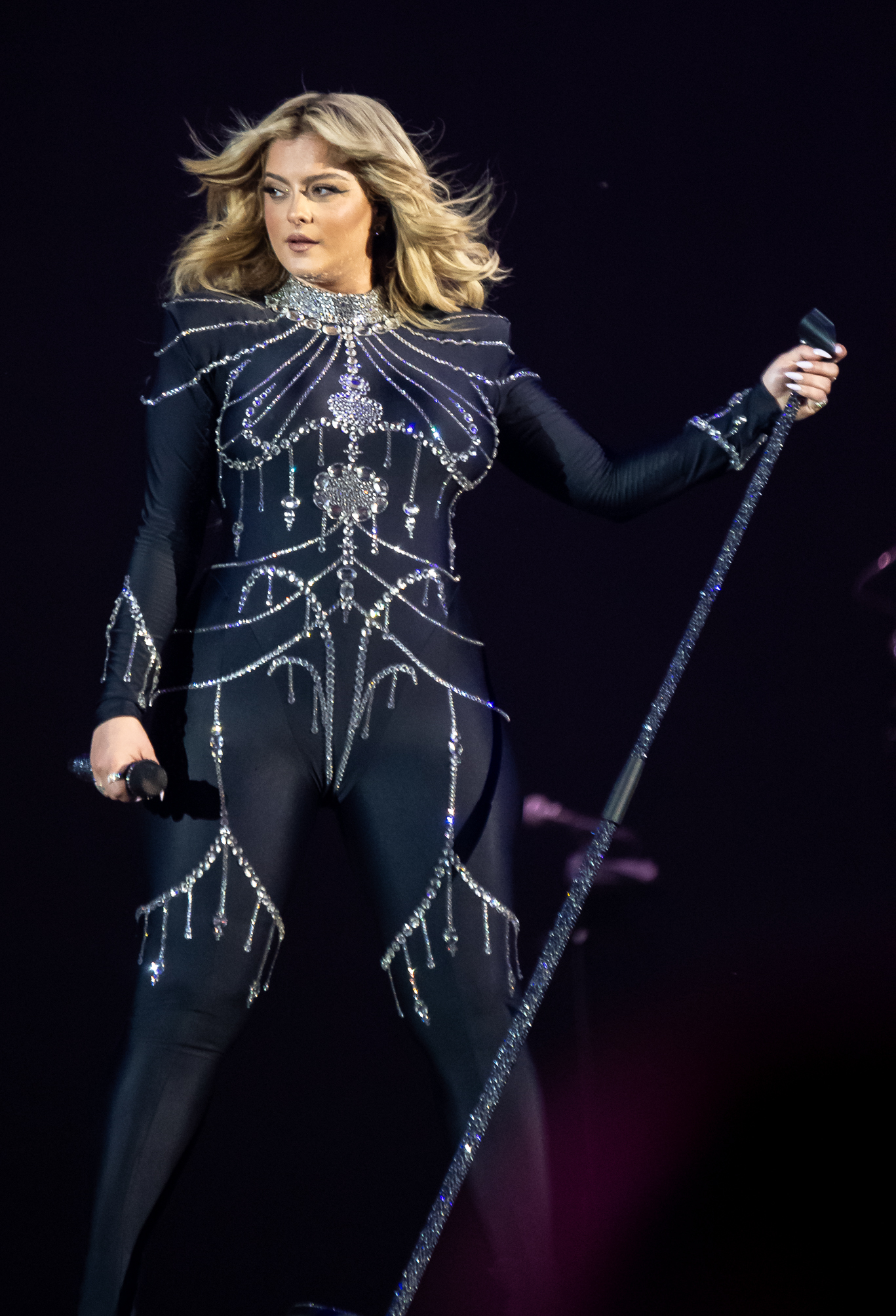
Rexha performing during the Untold Festival in August 2023

After releasing her third studio album Bebe (2023), Rexha had embarked on her accompanying Best F*n Night of My Life Tour, beginning on May 30, 2023. While performing on stage, an incident occurred where she was assaulted by someone who threw a cell phone at her face, causing a black eye which required stitches. The man was quickly identified and was arrested for assault and battery; under interrogation, the assailant admitted to the act where he believed it was a funny prank and later received a restraining order from Rexha. The next year, she had released her song "I'm the Drama" (2024), which later caused her to rant online on July 2 about the mistreatment she had in the music industry and with Warner Records for not receiving budgetary resources. Afterwards, there was no development in music for the following year, until Billboard reported that Rexha had signed with Timeline Management on December 16, 2025.

In January 2026, a fan asked Rexha about her situation with Warner Records to which she responded that she had departed from the record label, while also revealing her partnership with Empire Distribution as she is going "independent". With this sudden announcement, Rexha spoke with Variety where she described her excitement believing that "this new era is about embracing every part of myself [while being] comfortable in my own lane."

She uploaded an image on social media on January 22, showing herself and a whiteboard giving a list of "ins and outs"; this included the words "fatter" and "victim" all crossed-out, which referenced the fatphobia Rexha received online and her 2023 head injury. On the other list, she had written "unapologetic" and "confident", motivating herself to move on rather than reapproaching her old-self. In the same post, she also revealed a website titled areudirty.com, hinting at an imminent music release.

== Composition ==
Dirty Blonde features a variety of genres, such as pop, EDM, country and hip-hop, among others. The album's first promotional single, "I Like You Better Than Me", features dance-pop production.

== Promotion and release ==
Rexha announced her fourth album Dirty Blonde with a thirteen-second teaser, showcasing the track listing on February 11, 2026. The teaser showed that every song from the record would be supported by a music video. She then uploaded a "supercut" video which featured a snippet of each song being remixed, produced by American DJ Diplo, treating it as a promotional trailer. Rexha soon told Billboard that she intended to release each song as singles since she does not want "to be conformed by a certain sound or certain boundaries."

"I Like You Better Than Me" was released as the first promotional single of Dirty Blonde, on February 13. On the same day, it was announced that the album was set to be released on June 12. "Çike Çike" was released on February 20 as the second promotional single, and "New Religion" was released on March 6 as the album's first official single. On March 10, Rexha performed "New Religion" for the first time on Jimmy Kimmel Live!. "New Religion" features English dance group Faithless, whose 1995 club song "Insomnia" is sampled prominently. The fourth overall release and third promotional single, "Hysteria", was released on April 3. The second single from the album, titled "Sad Girls" which features David Guetta, was released on May 29 and marked the sixth collaboration between the two artists following 2023's "One In a Million". Rexha had teased the song's release on her social media platforms in the weeks leading up to its announcement and release and Guetta had performed the song in Ibiza. On September 25, "One Day" was sent to Contemporary Hit Radio as the third single.

== Critical reception ==
Professional ratings
Review scores
Source	Rating
AllMusic	3.5/5 stars
Jenesaispop	7/10
PopMatters	5/10
Stereoboard	3/5 stars

Jordi Bardají of Jenesaispop wrote that Dirty Blonde represented an effort by Bebe Rexha to establish a clearer artistic identity as an independent artist, and considered it partially successful. He praised Rexha's distinctive voice and songwriting abilities, and the album's melodic strengths, but felt it worked better as a collection of potential hit singles than as a cohesive artistic statement. Bardají also highlighted the album's nostalgic Eurodance influences, while criticizing its lack of unity and direction.

== Commercial performance ==
In the United States, Dirty Blonde debuted at number 43 on the Billboard 200 and atop the Top Dance Albums chart, with 19,000 album-equivalent units earned in its first week. Within the United Kingdom, it debuted at number 71 on the UK Albums Chart, with 2,341 album-equivalent units. In Scotland, Dirty Blonde became Rexha's first top ten album, where it debuted at number eight. Elsewhere, the album reached number 37 in Australia, number 85 in France, and number 63 in Spain.

== Track listing ==
Dirty Blonde track listing
No.	Title	Writer(s)	Producer(s)	Length
1.	"Hysteria"	Bebe Rexha; Maxwell Matluck; Edwin Serrano; Jacob Torrey; Jean Baptiste Kouame; Karl Rubin; Ryan Buendia; Victor Thell; Boaz de Jong	Jean Baptiste; Rubin; Buendia; Thell; Boaz van de Beatz	2:23
2.	"Tokyo"	Rexha; Sarah Hudson; Torrey; John Morgan; William Lansley; Lewis Jankel	Punctual; Shift K3Y; Daniel Cullen^{[v]}	2:00
3.	"New Religion" (with Faithless)	Rexha; Hannah Berney; Jonathan Bach; Torrey; Alexander Novodor; Dominic Perfetti; Morgan; Lansley; Neave Applebaum; Maxwell Fraser; Ayalah Bentovim; Rollo Armstrong	Punctual; Applebaum	2:54
4.	"S.H.I.T"	Rexha; Elizabeth Boland; Nathan Ferraro; Serrano; Daniel Cullen; Chauncey Hollis, Jr.; Jesse Blum	Hit-Boy; Dr. Jesse Blum; Lil' Eddie^{[v]}; Cullen^{[v]}	2:06
5.	"Çike Çike"	Rexha; Bianca Atterberry; Ferraro; William Grigahcine; Rocco Gino Smith; Marcel Kosic; Baptiste; Rubin; Buendia	Baptiste; Rubin; Buendia; DJ Snake; Rockywhereyoubeen; Vlado; Cullen^{[c]}	2:19
6.	"I Like You Better Than Me"	Rexha; Ferraro; Torrey; Morgan; Lansley	Punctual; Baptiste; Rubin; Buendia; Thell	2:37
7.	"Drink and a Little Love"	Rexha; Sarah Troy; Stephen Benson; Tushar Apte; Jakob Rabitsch; Richard Butler, Jr.	Yakob; Rico Love; Apte^{[p]}; Nitti^{[c]}; Mitch Allan^{[v]}; Franco Ferruzo^{[v]}	2:40
8.	"One Day"	Rexha; Casey Smith; Chloe Angelides; Yonatan Goldstein	Johnny Goldstein	3:08
9.	"Time"	Rexha; Atterberry; Serrano; Baptiste; Rubin; Buendia; Thell; Edgar Ferrera; Almando Cresso	Baptiste; Rubin; Buendia; Thell; SkipOnDaBeat; Cresso; Lil' Eddie^{[v]}; Cullen^{[v]}; DVNCY^{[v]}	2:47
10.	"The Way I Want You"	Rexha; Ryan Santiago; Serrano; Richard Mears IV; Bas van Daalen	Nitti; Will Grands; Lil' Eddie^{[v]}	2:30
11.	"Nobody's There"	Rexha; Isabelle Carlsson; Serrano; Morgan; Lansley	Punctual; Lil' Eddie^{[v]}	2:00
12.	"Night Falls"	Rexha; Serrano; Baptiste; Rubin; Buendia	Baptiste; Rubin; Buendia; Lil' Eddie^{[v]}; Cullen^{[v]}; DVNCY^{[v]}	3:23
13.	"Sad Girls" (with David Guetta)	Rexha; Carlsson; Vera Carlbom; Emma "Kiddo" Bertilsson; Brittany Hazzard; Taylor Ross; Fredrik Samsson; Ludvig Soderberg; Pierre Guetta; Timofey Reznikov; Oskar Rindborg	Rexha; Guetta; Reznikov; Osrin; A Strut; Zikai^{[v]}; Starrah^{[v]}; Vera Hotsauce^{[v]}	2:48
Total length:				33:40

Physical edition
No.	Title	Writer(s)	Producer(s)	Length
14.	"I Don't Need Anything"	Rexha; Lauren Christy; Thomas Barnes; Peter Kelleher; Benjamin Kohn	TMS	3:30

Notes

- ^{^[c]} signifies a co-producer.
- ^{^[v]} signifies a vocal producer.
- "Tokyo" is misspelt as "Toyko" on early physical editions.
- "S.H.I.T" is stylized as "$.H.I.T".
- "I Like You Better Than Me" is stylized in all lowercase.
- "New Religion" samples "Insomnia" (1995), written by Rollo Armstrong, Maxwell Fraser, and Ayalah Bentovim, and performed by Faithless.
- "I Don't Need Anything" is the demo title for her 2015 collaborative single "Me, Myself & I" with G-Eazy.

== Personnel ==
Credits are adapted from Tidal.

- Bebe Rexha – vocals, executive production (all tracks)
- Daniel Cullen – engineering (tracks 1–6, 8–12); arrangement, drums (4)
- Kevin Grainger – mixing, mastering (1–7, 9–12)
- Alex Gomme – mixing assistance (1–7, 9–12)
- Leo Butler – mixing (1, 2, 4–7, 9–13)
- Edwin Serrano – background vocals (1, 3)
- Cameron Hogan – engineering assistance (1, 3)
- Christopher Burks – engineering assistance (1)
- Jake Torrey – guitar (1)
- Punctual – bass, drums, synthesizer (2, 3, 7, 11); programming (2, 3, 11)
- Ghazi – mixing (3)
- Alex Lee – engineering assistance (3)
- Jake Rene – engineering assistance (3)
- DJ Snake – drums, keyboards (5)
- Rockywhereyoubeen – drums, keyboards (5)
- Vlado – drums, keyboards (5)
- Rob Moreno – engineering assistance (5)
- Tushar Apte – bass, drum programming, guitar, piano, synthesizer (7)
- Yakob – Dobro guitar, drum programming, synthesizer (7)
- Ricky Mears – drum programming, guitar (7)
- Franco Ferruzo – vocal engineering (7)
- Johnny Goldstein – bass, drums, guitar, keyboards, programming, engineering (8)
- Casey Smith – background vocals (8)
- Manny Marroquin – mixing (8)
- Joe LaPorta – mastering (8)
- Devon Corey – engineering (9, 12)
- Timofey Reznikov – mixing, mastering (13)

== Charts ==
Chart performance
Chart (2026)	Peak position
Australian Albums (ARIA)	37
French Albums (SNEP)	85
Portuguese Albums (AFP)	193
Scottish Albums (Official Charts)	8
Spanish Albums (PROMUSICAE)	63
UK Albums (Official Charts)	71
UK Independent Albums (Official Charts)	4
US Billboard 200	43
US Independent Albums (Billboard)	6
US Top Dance Albums (Billboard)	1

== Release history ==
List of release dates
Region	Date	Format(s)	Label	Ref.
Various	June 12, 2026	Cassette; CD; digital download; streaming; vinyl	Empire	
