= Awake Tonight =

2026 single by Afrojack, Sia and David Guetta

Single by Afrojack, Sia and David Guetta
- Released: April 10, 2026
- Recorded: 2014
- Genre: Dance-pop; Electro house
- Length: 3:11
- Label: Wall Recordings, Spinnin' Records
- Songwriters: Sia Furler; Nick van de Wall; David Guetta; Giorgio Tuinfort; Mikkel S. Eriksen; Tor Erik Hermansen
- Producers: Afrojack; David Guetta; Stargate; Giorgio Tuinfort

Afrojack singles chronology
"Control" (2026)	"Awake Tonight" (2026)	"The Last Time" (2026)

Sia singles chronology
"Ranjha" (2026)	"Awake Tonight" (2026)	"Disguise" (2026)

David Guetta singles chronology
"Die Living" (2026)	"Awake Tonight" (2026)	"Sad Girls" (2026)

"Awake Tonight" is a song by Dutch DJ Afrojack, Australian singer-songwriter Sia, and French record producer David Guetta. It was released on April 10, 2026, through Wall Recordings and Spinnin' Records. Though released in 2026, the song's production dates back to 2014.

== Background and development ==
"Awake Tonight" has a long history, originally being recorded in 2014. The initial version was produced solely by the Norwegian production duo Stargate. Despite being completed, the track remained unreleased for over a decade.

The song first gained public attention when a demo version by Sia featuring English singer Foxes leaked online in December 2019. A full solo version by Foxes subsequently leaked in September 2020. For the official 2026 release, the production was updated by Afrojack and David Guetta to align with modern electronic music standards while retaining Sia's original 2014 vocal recording.

== Release and promotion ==
The track was officially premiered by Afrojack during his set at the Ultra Music Festival in Miami in March 2026. Its release on April 10, 2026, was timed to coincide with the start of the summer festival season.

== Composition ==
"Awake Tonight" is a dance-pop and electro house track that features Sia's signature powerhouse vocals over a production style reminiscent of the mid-2010s "Big Room" house era. The song was written by Sia Furler, Nick van de Wall, David Guetta, Giorgio Tuinfort, and the Stargate duo, who also handled the primary production.

== Personnel ==
Credits adapted from Apple Music.

- Afrojack – producer, songwriter, synthesizer, drums
- Sia – vocals, songwriter
- David Guetta – producer, songwriter
- Stargate – producers, songwriters
- Giorgio Tuinfort – producer, songwriter, piano, synthesizer
- Pierre-Luc Rioux – guitar
- Bryce Bordone – engineer
- Serban Ghenea – mixing engineer
- Randy Merrill – mastering engineer

== Release history ==
Region	Date	Format	Label
Various	April 10, 2026	Digital download; streaming	Wall; Spinnin'
