= Stay (Don't Go Away) =

2019 song by David Guetta

Single by David Guetta featuring Raye
- Released: 9 May 2019
- Recorded: April 2019
- Genre: House
- Length: 3:06
- Label: What a Music; Parlophone
- Composers: Cameron Gower Poole; Carl Falk; David Guetta; Timofey Reznikov
- Lyricists: Kennedi Lykken; Rachel Keen
- Producers: David Guetta; Carl Falk; Timofey Reznikov

David Guetta singles chronology
"This Ain't Techno" (2019)	"Stay (Don't Go Away)" (2019)	"Instagram" (2019)

Raye singles chronology
"The Fruits" (2019)	"Stay (Don't Go Away)" (2019)	"Love Me Again" (2019)

Music video
- "Stay (Don't Go Away)" on YouTube

"Stay (Don't Go Away)" is a song by French DJ David Guetta featuring British singer Raye and was released on 9 May 2019. The track became Guetta's eighth number one and Raye's first on Billboard's Dance/Mix Show Airplay chart in its 13 July 2019 issue.

== Charts ==
=== Weekly charts ===
Chart (2019)	Peak position
Australia (ARIA)	88
Belgium (Ultratip Bubbling Under Flanders)	11
Belgium (Ultratop 50 Wallonia)	15
Colombia (National-Report)	86
Czech Republic Airplay (ČNS IFPI)	35
France (SNEP)	155
Hungary (Dance Top 40)	6
Hungary (Rádiós Top 40)	5
Ireland (IRMA)	42
Lithuania (AGATA)	99
Netherlands (Dutch Top 40)	29
New Zealand Hot Singles (RMNZ)	19
Poland Airplay (ZPAV)	10
Russia Airplay (TopHit)	92
Scottish Singles Sales (Official Charts)	46
Slovakia Airplay (ČNS IFPI)	48
Slovenia (SloTop50)	11
Sweden (Sverigetopplistan)	72
UK Singles (Official Charts)	41
UK Dance (Official Charts)	6
US Dance Club Songs (Billboard)	1
US Hot Dance/Electronic Songs (Billboard)	18

=== Year-end charts ===
Chart (2019)	Position
Belgium (Ultratop Wallonia)	88
Hungary (Dance Top 40)	41
Hungary (Rádiós Top 40)	55
US Dance Club Songs (Billboard)	10
US Hot Dance/Electronic Songs (Billboard)	70

== Certifications ==
Region	Certification	Certified units/sales
France (SNEP)	Gold	100,000^{‡}
United Kingdom (BPI)	Silver	200,000^{‡}
^{‡} Sales+streaming figures based on certification alone.

== See also ==
- List of Billboard number-one dance songs of 2019
