= Sad Girls =

Single by Bebe Rexha and David Guetta

from the album Dirty Blonde
- Released: May 29, 2026
- Genre: Dance-pop
- Length: 2:48
- Label: Empire
- Composers: Bleta Rexha; David Pierre Guetta; Emma "Kiddo" Bertilsson; Fredrik Samsson; Isabelle Zikai Gbotto Carlsson; Ludvig Soderberg; Oskar Rindborg; Timofey Reznikov; Vera Carlbom
- Producers: David Guetta; Kiddo; A Strut; Osrin; Starrah; Reznikov; Vera Hotsauce; Zikai

Bebe Rexha singles chronology
"New Religion" (2026)	"Sad Girls" (2026)	"One Day" (2026)

David Guetta singles chronology
"Awake Tonight" (2026)	"Sad Girls" (2026)	"Run Run River (Angels Above Me)" (2026)

Music video
- "Sad Girls" on YouTube

"Sad Girls" is a song by American singer Bebe Rexha and French DJ and record producer David Guetta. It was released on May 29, 2026, through Empire Distribution, as the second single from Rexha's fourth studio album, Dirty Blonde. The song reached number one on US dance radio.

== Background and composition ==
In March 2026, Bebe Rexha released "New Religion" as the lead single from her fourth album Dirty Blonde, which marks her first project as an independent artist following her departure from Warner. The song achieved commercial success, topping the Billboard Dance/Mix Show Airplay chart in the United States. On May 26, Rexha announced "Sad Girls" on her social media in a video with Guetta, giving a release date of May 29. Both artists have previously worked together, including the songs "Hey Mama" (2015), "Say My Name" (2018), "I'm Good (Blue)" (2022), and "One in a Million" (2023).

"Sad Girls" is a dance-pop track, which in a statement Rexha described as:

"'Sad Girls' is for anyone who has ever been on a dance floor with a broken heart and refused to let it win. You’re not okay, but you’re still dancing and showing up for yourself. That’s one of the most powerful things you can do in those moments."

== Critical reception ==
Rolling Stone described the song as a "anthemic dance number".

== Commercial performance ==
"Sad Girls" debuted at number ten on the New Zealand Hot Singles chart, while appearing in the top thirty on airplay charts in Belarus, Bolivia, Czech Republic, Estonia, Kazakhstan, Latvia, Lithuania, Moldova, Poland, Russia and Slovakia.

== Charts ==
=== Weekly charts ===
Weekly chart performance
Chart (2026)	Peak position
Belarus Airplay (TopHit)	14
Belgium (Ultratop 50 Wallonia)	45
Bolivia Airplay (Monitor Latino)	10
Canada CHR/Top 40 (Billboard)	35
Central America Anglo Airplay (Monitor Latino)	13
CIS Airplay (TopHit)	6
Czech Republic Airplay (ČNS IFPI)	1
El Salvador Anglo Airplay (Monitor Latino)	8
Estonia Airplay (TopHit)	7
Hungary (Rádiós Top 40)	29
Italy Airplay (EarOne)	73
Kazakhstan Airplay (TopHit)	13
Latvia Airplay (LaIPA)	13
Lithuania Airplay (TopHit)	3
Mexico Anglo Airplay (Monitor Latino)	5
Moldova Airplay (TopHit)	29
Netherlands (Tipparade)	14
Netherlands (Single Tip)	30
New Zealand Hot Singles (RMNZ)	10
North Macedonia Airplay (Radiomonitor)	7
Poland Airplay (OLiS)	27
Russia Airplay (TopHit)	3
Slovakia Airplay (ČNS IFPI)	4
Ukraine Airplay (TopHit)	150
US Dance Airplay (Billboard)	1
US Hot Dance/Electronic Songs (Billboard)	9

=== Monthly charts ===
Monthly chart performance
Chart (2026)	Peak position
Belarus Airplay (TopHit)	16
CIS Airplay (TopHit)	8
Estonia Airplay (TopHit)	11
Kazakhstan Airplay (TopHit)	30
Latvia Airplay (TopHit)	4
Lithuania Airplay (TopHit)	4
Moldova Airplay (TopHit)	35
Russia Airplay (TopHit)	3

== Release history ==
Release dates and formats for "Sad Girls"
Region	Date	Format	Label	Ref.
Various	May 29, 2026	Digital download; streaming	Empire	
Italy	June 3, 2026	Radio airplay	Empire	
