= Clubbing TV =

- Country: France
- Headquarters: Paris, France

Programming
- Languages: English, French
- Picture format: 1080i (HDTV)

History
- Launched: 9 January 2009; 17 years ago

Links
- Website: www.clubbingtv.com

Clubbing TV is a television channel dedicated to electronic music, DJ's and dance music culture.

== History ==
The channel was launched on January 19, 2009, on the occasion of the opening of the 43rd edition of the Midem in Cannes. The idea originated from the meeting of professionals from Dance Music, International DJs, Promoters, Label Managers.

Clubbing TV is an official partner of some of the biggest electro festivals worldwide and brings you to the heart of events like the famous Amsterdam Dance Event, the Winter Music Conference in Miami, the Ibiza International Music Summit, Time Warp Festival, I Love Techno, Tomorrowland, Exit Festival, Electrobeach Music Festival and the Ibiza superclub parties.

== Distribution ==
The channel can be seen locally in France, as well in Russia since April 2017 and in the Asia-Pacific region, the Middle East, Australia and East Africa via MEASAT-3a (C-band).
