= Electrobeach Music Festival =

Festival

Coordinates: 42.8275°N 3.0412°E

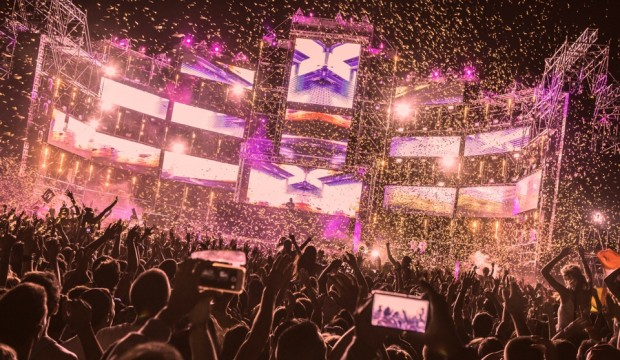
- Electrobeach Music Festival in 2014
- Genre: Electronic dance music
- Dates: 3 days in July
- Locations: Port-Barcarès, France
- Years active: 2009 – present
- Founders: Alain Ferrand
- Attendance: 180,000 (3 days)
- Capacity: 60,000
- Website: Electrobeach.com

Electrobeach Music Festival (often abbreviated as EMF) is an annual in July electronic dance music festival held at a park in Port-Barcarès, France. Recent lineups include Afrojack, Tara McDonald, Dirty South, Hardwell, Sebastian Ingrosso and Armin Van Buuren. In 2014 there were two stages and a capacity of people. 2013 saw 56,000 people over two days. 2014 saw 80,000 people over two days, there were two stages and a capacity of 40,000 people.

== Line up ==
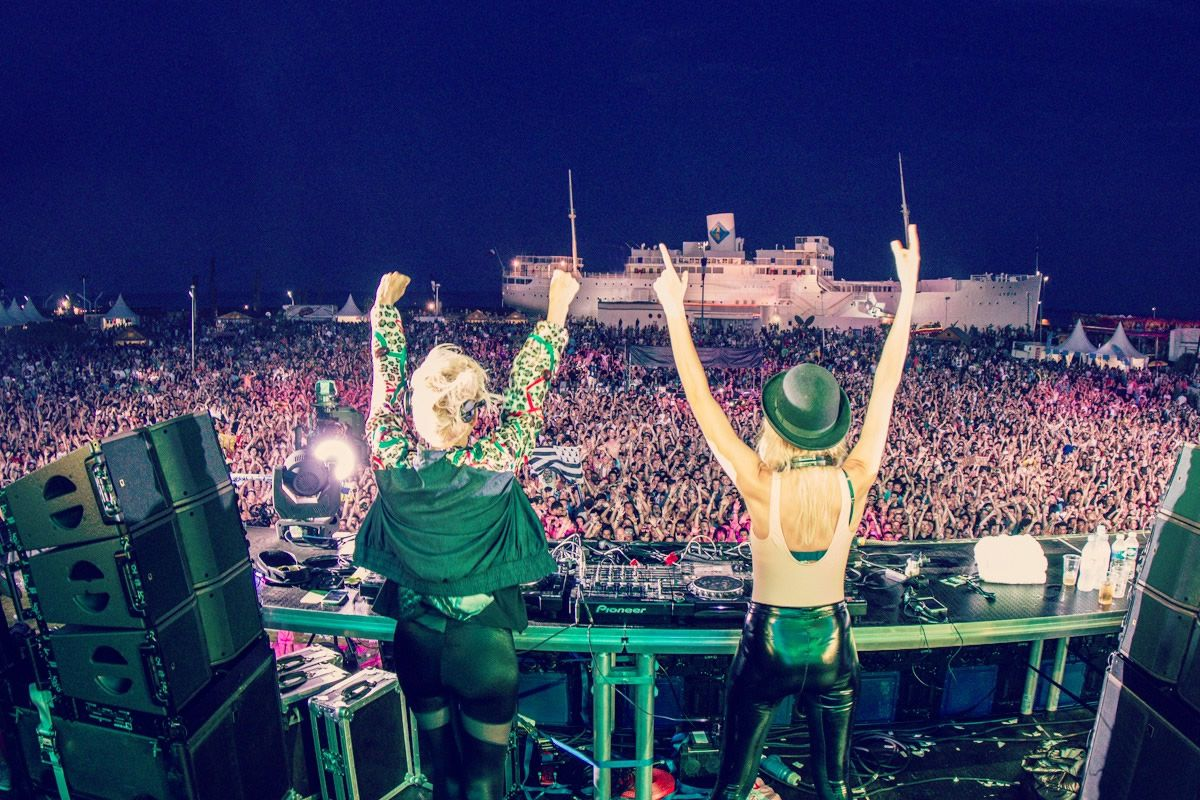
Electrobeach 2013

2009

David Asko, Da Fresh, Greg Cerrone, Antoine Clamaran, Joachim Garraud.

2010

Ludovic Rambaud, David Tort, David Vendetta, Fedde Le Grand, Laurent Wolf

2011

Dj Luxury, Ron Carroll, Michaël Canitrot, Bob Sinclar

2012

- Beach Stage : Alex De Guirior, Sergi Domene, Serebro, AutoErotique
- Mainstage : Kalvin Berg, Sébastien Benett, Tara McDonald, Example, DJ Wire, Basto, Ferry Corsten, Steve Aoki

Édition 2013

- Friday 19 July : Circoloogik DJs (Juliano Blanco, Doms Owls, John Lorv's, Funknow & James Kentaro), DJ Ralph, Morgan Nagoya, Alex De Guiror et Marsal Ventura, Reepublic, Markus Schulz, Dirty South, Martin Solveig, Sebastian Ingrosso, Afrojack, Hardwell.
- Saturday 20 July : Circoloogik DJs (Juliano Blanco, Doms Owls, John Lorv's, Funknow & James Kentaro), Jay Style, Sergi Domene, DJ Smash, Nervo, Dizzee Rascal, David Guetta, Nicky Romero.

2014

- Friday 11 July :
  - Mainstage : Adrien Toma & DJ Neil, Alex De Guiror & Marsal Ventura, DubVision, DJ Antoine, Krewella, Hard Rock Sofa, R3hab, DJ Snake, W&W, Calvin Harris, Armin van Buuren.
  - Beach stage : Will Buck, Adam Trigger, Jordi Veliz, D.O.N.S, DJ Ralph, Quentin Mosimann.
- Saturday 12 July :
  - Mainstage : Mico C, Sergi Domene, Lets Be Friends, Julian Jordan, Cerrone, Sultan & Ned Shepard, Sebastien Benett, DJ Smash, Example, Fatboy Slim, Sander Van Doorn, Tinie Tempah, Axwell.
  - EMF Talent : Sylvain Bullier, Freakshow, Marcan, Ocio, Doms Owls, Souzo, Kikker Ft. Manu Dibango, Juli, John Lorvs.

2015

- Friday 10 July :
  - Mainstage : Mico C, Jordi Veliz, Lucas & Steve, Matisse & Sadko, Cazette, Otto Knows, Nervo, Madeon, Kaskade, Dimitri Vegas & Like Mike, Avicii
- Saturday 11 July :
  - Mainstage : Adrien Toma, Alex de Guiror & Marsal Ventura, Arias, Syn Cole, Galantis, Firebeatz, Arty, Don Diablo, Martin Solveig, Alesso, Steve Angello
- Sunday 12 July :
  - Mainstage : Sergi Domene, Maria Helena, Dzeko & Torres, DJ Fresh, Dirty South, Smash, Erick Morillo, Tiësto, Zedd, Axwell Λ Ingrosso, Armin Van Buuren

2016

- Thursday 14 July:
  - Michael Calfan, Tiësto, Michael Canitrot, Eric Prydz, Martin Garrix, Martin Solveig, Arno Cost, Throttle, Luciano & Friends, KIKKR
- Friday 15 July:
  - Robin Schulz, Axwell Λ Ingrosso, EDX, Ruby Rose, Mosimann, Sunnery James & Ryan Marciano, Norman Doray, Tony Romera, Klosman
- Saturday 16 July:
  - Hardwell, Smash, DJ Snake, Dillon Francis, Nicky Romero, Pep & Rash, Swanky Tunes
- Also:
  - Luciano, Sven Väth, César Merveille, DOP, Ilario Alicante, Markus Fix, DJ Ralph, Adrien Toma, Jordi Veliz, Mico C, Maeva Carter, Marsal Ventura, Philippe B, Sergi Domene
- Added on 30 March 2016, more acts yet to be announced

== Gallery ==
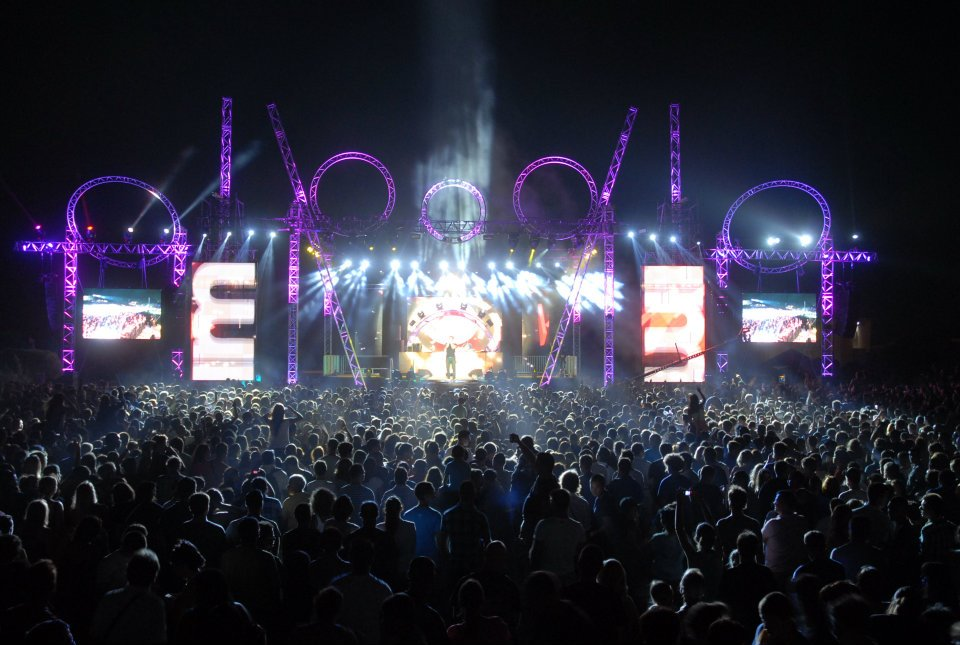
2012

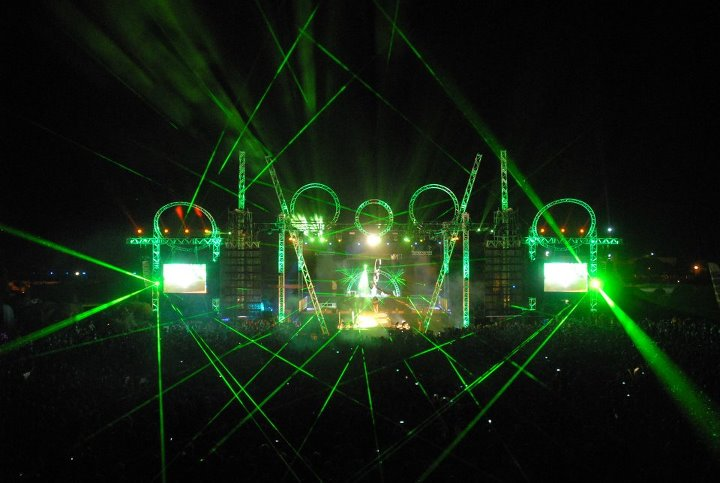
2012

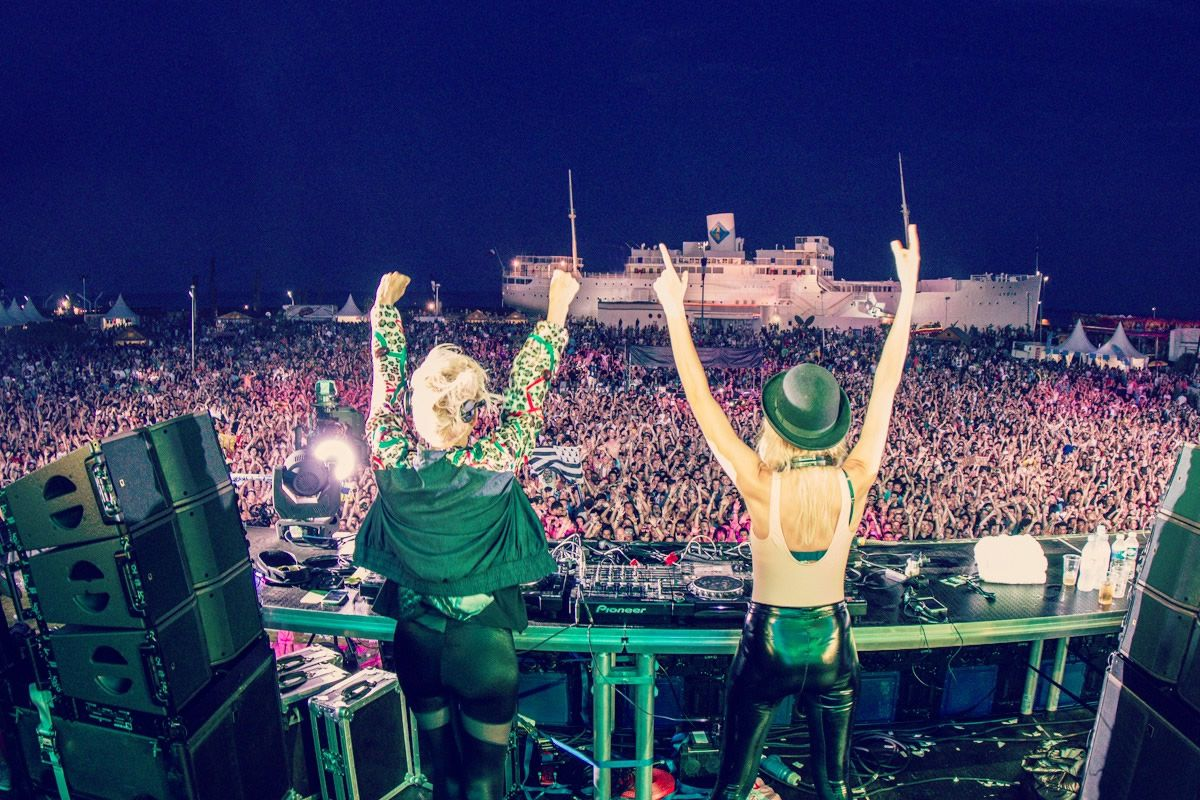
2013

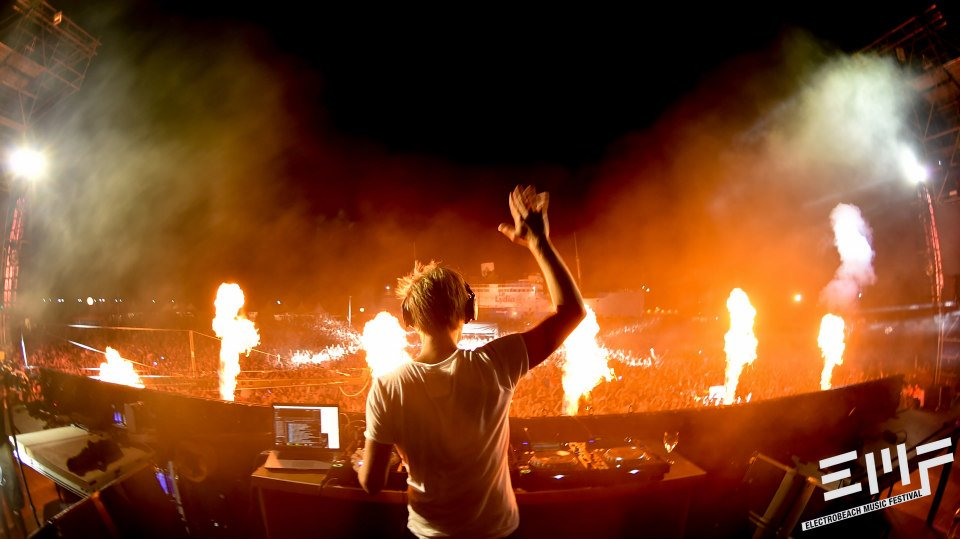
2014

== See also ==
- List of electronic music festivals
- Live electronic music
