= Miss Monique =

Ukrainian techno and progressive house DJ

- Miss Monique in 2026

Background information
- Born: Alesia Arkusha; 5 May 1992 (age 34); Ukraine
- Genres: Progressive house; melodic techno
- Occupation: DJ
- Label: Siona Records

Alesia Arkusha (Ukrainian: Алеся Аркуша; born May 5, 1992), known professionally as Miss Monique, is a Ukrainian DJ, producer and owner of Siona Records. She became known in the electronic music world due to the creation of the YouTube channels "Mind Games" and "MiMo Weekly", but also due to releases on labels such as Tomorrowland Music, Armada, Drumcode and Black Hole Recordings, as well as remixes for David Guetta, Moby and Madonna. She is now into her second season as an Ibiza resident DJ, taking over the Club Room at Hï Ibiza for 2026.

== Biography ==
Born in Kirovograd (now Kropyvnytskyi) in central Ukraine, Miss Monique moved to Kyiv with her family aged 8, and began frequenting clubs there from the age of 16.

After the full-scale Russian invasion of Ukraine began on 24 February 2022, Miss Monique and her family had to flee. Miss Monique currently lives in Portugal.

== Career ==
Miss Monique found her vocation at the beginning of the 2010s. In 2014 she began a collaboration with the label Freegrant Music. The tracks released on this label were recognised by some of the world's major DJs, in particular Armin van Buuren. She soon began performing internationally and is one of the 20 most popular Ukrainian pop stars, with her hit "Way of the Wind" ranked the 14th best progressive house song of the year in 2021.

Miss Monique's musical style centres on progressive house, which overlaps considerably with melodic techno. She is known for her livestreaming content production, with her Youtube videos routinely reaching views in the millions, with some reaching up to 24 million. Her green-dyed hair remains a distinctive feature in her performances.

In 2022, Miss Monique remixed Sied van Riel's "Rush", which became the most-sold progressive house track on Beatport that year. Further notable remixes include "Sorry" by BLOND:ISH featuring Madonna, "I Don’t Wanna Wait" for David Guetta and One Republic, and "Ringo" by Lufthaus, Robbie Williams’s dance project. She has also released a series of singles of her own: "Subterranean" with Avira and Luna (Armada), "Nomacita" with Genesi and Carl Bee (Aeterna); "Look At You" (Interstellar / Insomniac Records), "Magnet" and "Bloom At Night" (Tomorrowland Music), "Is Anyone There?" with HERTZ & Jantine (Siona Records), "Rain" with Poppy Baskcomb (Three Six Zero) and "City Boy" (Drumcode).

Miss Monique founded her own label Siona Records in 2019, to release her own music as well as spotlighting emerging talent. Conceiving of it as a platform for young artists to showcase innovative sounds, she is able to support Ukrainian producers by using the platform every March to highlight their work. Following the Russian invasion of Ukraine, she and her label have stopped supporting and working with Russian artists. In 2024, Miss Monique signed Siona Records to Above Board Distribution, part of Sony Music's The Orchard.

In 2024 Miss Monique won the Breakthrough Artist award at the DJ Awards- the first occurrence of the awards after a four year hiatus. In 2025 Miss Monique was nominated for a DJ Award, in the Progressive/Melodic House category, and entered DJ Mag's Top 100 DJs poll for the first time at 75.

Excerpt from "Concorde" by Miss Monique, performed at the Montreal Biosphere in October 2022

On 18 September 2026, Miss Monique's collaboration with British singer Robbie Williams was released as a single; an official visualiser, directed by Charlie Lightening, was released the day before. The duo premiered the track in August 2026 during Carl Cox's DJ set in Ibiza. "Beauty in Us" debuted at number 79 on the UK Singles Sales Chart.

=== Performances ===
In October 2022, Miss Monique performed during the Cercle Festival at the Montreal Biosphere, where she premiered her new single "Concorde". She has performed with artists including David Guetta, as well as at Coachella, Ultra Miami and EDC Vegas and the main stages of many electronic festivals. In 2024, Miss Monique made her debut on Pete Tong's BBC Radio 1 Essential Mix, and in 2025 she hosted a 13-week residency in the Club Room at Hï Ibiza, the world's number one nightclub, and performed at the following events: Tomorrowland's Main Stage, Sziget Festival, Awakenings Festival, Mysteryland and in front of the Louvre Museum for France Music Week.

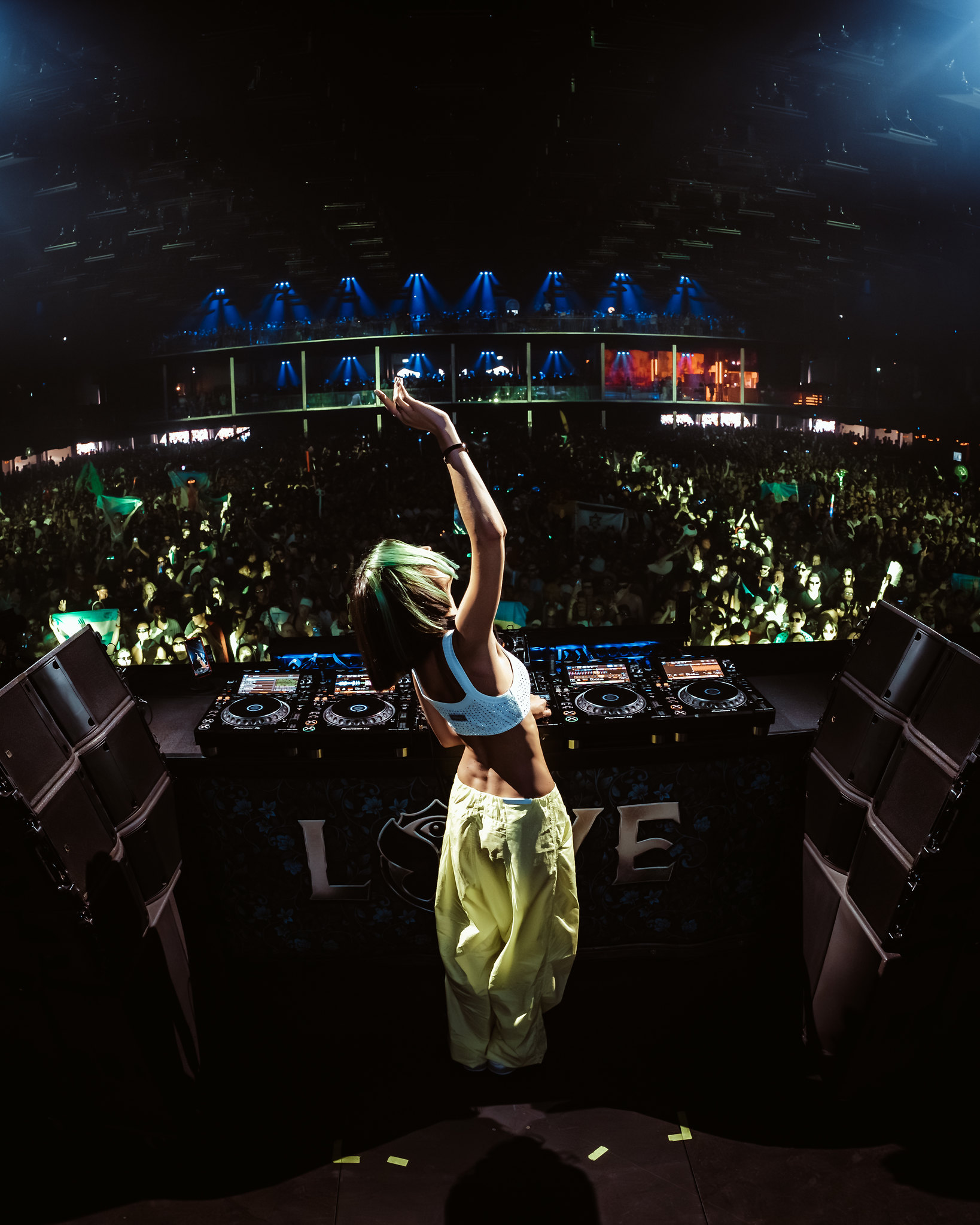
Miss Monique at Tomorrowland's Freedom Stage in July 2025

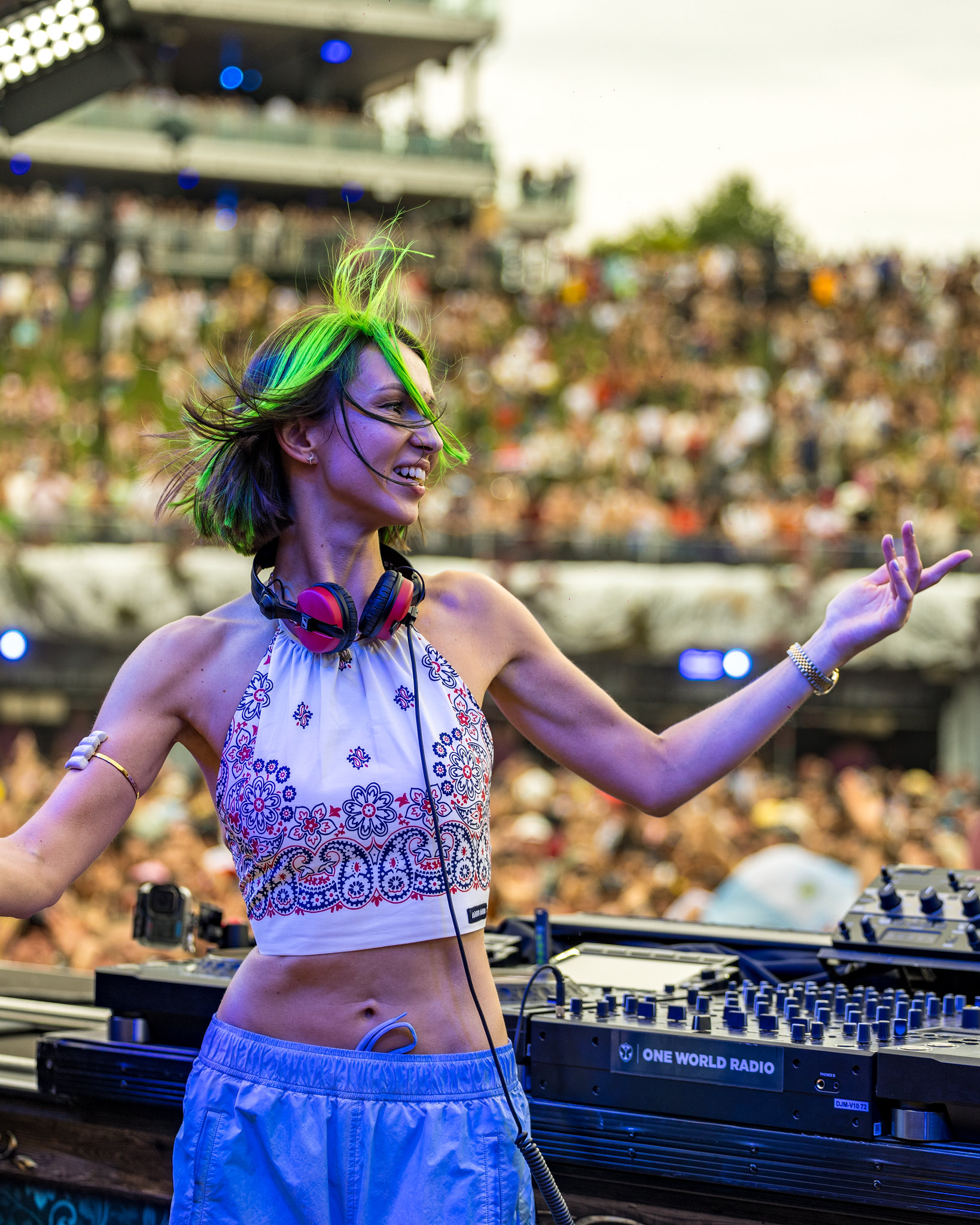
Miss Monique at Tomorrowland's Main Stage in July 2025

In 2026, Miss Monique premiered Biorhythm, a new show integrating real-time generative industrial visuals with organic elements, designed to highlight the intersection of nature and electronic music. The show debuted at Tomorrowland's Freedom stage, the festival's second-largest arena, on 17 July 2026. Subsequent dates were scheduled at Mandarine Park in Buenos Aires (3 October), and the upcoming Brooklyn Hall @ Pacha NYC (13 November), and Phantom in Paris (27 November). The Tomorrowland debut preceded her third consecutive main stage performance at the festival, on 24 July 2026.

In September 2026, Miss Monique was featured in We Are Tomorrow, a documentary produced by Tomorrowland and Amazon Music that follows her career, experience of displacement following Russia's full-scale invasion of Ukraine, and performance at Tomorrowland. The film also features the Amazon Music original "Million Miles Away (VIP Remix)" by Miss Monique, P.O.U. and Susie Ledge.

== Discography ==
=== Singles ===
- 2015: "No Fear"
- 2016: "Colors in Your Eyes"
- 2016: "I Need U" (with Max Freegrant)
- 2016: "Why" (with Max Freegrant)
- 2018: "Tran"
- 2018: "Means to an End" (with Thea Riley)
- 2019: "No Way"
- 2019: "Stranger Things" (with Max Freegrant)
- 2019: "The One" (with Cherry (UA))
- 2019: "About Us" (with Helen&Boys)
- 2019: "Helios / Eros"
- 2019: "Timelapse"
- 2020: "Behind the Mirror / Ceibo"
- 2020: "Dark Forest"
- 2020: "Bombay"
- 2020: "Silent" (with Pavel Khvaleev & Avis Vox)
- 2020: "City Nights, City Lights"
- 2020: "Andromeda / Emerald" (with Two Are)
- 2021: "Rider" (with Pavel Khvaleev & PARAFRAME)
- 2021: "Raindrop"
- 2021: "Valhalla" (with Sean & Dee)
- 2021: "Don't Come Back" (with Nahue Sintes, featuring JOSEFINA)
- 2021: "Train of Thought"
- 2021: "Way of the Wind"
- 2021: "Loona"
- 2021: "Land of Sunshine / Out of Sight"
- 2021: "Eclipse" (with Anima)
- 2022: "Hideaway" (with The Alexsander, featuring Vania)
- 2022: "Elamy"
- 2022: "All I Got / Four Hills"
- 2022: "Into My Arms"
- 2022: "Plato" (with Cherry (UA))
- 2022: "Biosphère"
- 2022: "Electric" (with ASHER SWISSA & SANDHAUS)
- 2023: "Concorde"
- 2023: "Molfar / Tiama"
- 2023: "City Boy"
- 2023: "Rebirth / The Connection"
- 2023: "Subterranean" (with AVIRA & LUNA)
- 2023: "The Morning After" (with Paul Thomas)
- 2024: "Veselka"
- 2024: "Bloom at Night"
- 2024: "Look at You"
- 2024: "Every Breath" (with braev)
- 2024: "Feeling So Real 2024" (edit) (with Moby)
- 2025: "Nomacita" (with GENESI & Carl Bee)
- 2025: "Million Miles Away" (with P.O.U & Susie Ledge)
- 2025: "Magnet"
- 2025: "Is Anyone There?" (with HRRTZ & Jantine)
- 2025: "Rain" (with Poppy Baskcomb)
- 2025: "Rollin'" (with Glowal)
- 2025: "Lost on a Dancefloor" (with Glowal)
- 2026: "Blue Moon Factory"
- 2026: "Rajada" (with Agents of Time)
- 2026: "Hot Sauce" (with Kapuchon & GLZ)
- 2026: "Ghosts" (with Nicolas Taboada & FRANCO BA)

=== Charted singles ===
Title	Year	Peak chart positions			Album
Title	Year	ARG Ang. Air.	LTU Air.	UKR Air.	Album
"Beauty in Us" (with Robbie Williams)	2026	13	69	57	Non-album single

=== Remixes ===
- 2020: "My Own Time (Miss Monique Remix)" - Darin Epsilon & Alice Rose
- 2021: "All Alone (Miss Monique Remix)" - Alexandros Djkevingr, Greg Ignatovich & James Tristan
- 2021: "Yang (Miss Monique Remix)" - Paul Thomas & Fuenka
- 2021: "The Parallel (Miss Monique Remix)" - Morttagua
- 2022: "Rush (Miss Monique Remix)" - Sied Van Riel
- 2023: "Sorry (Miss Monique Remix)" - BLOND:ISH, Darmon, Eran Hersh & Madonna
- 2023: "Ringo (Miss Monique Remix)" - Lufthaus
- 2024: "I Don't Wanna Wait (Miss Monique Remix)" - David Guetta & OneRepublic
- 2025: "Beautiful People (Miss Monique Remix)" - David Guetta & Sia
- 2026: "Million Miles Away (Miss Monique VIP Remix)" - Miss Monique, P.O.U & Susie Ledge
