= New Religion (Bebe Rexha and Faithless song) =

Single by Bebe Rexha and Faithless

from the album Dirty Blonde
- Released: March 6, 2026
- Recorded: c. February 2024
- Genre: EDM; dance music
- Length: 2:54
- Label: Empire
- Composers: Neave Applebaum; John Morgan; William Lansley; N.A; Jake Torrey; Dominic Perfetti; Alex Novodor; Rollo Armstrong; Maxwell Fraser; Ayalah Bentovim
- Lyricists: Bleta Rexha; Hannah Berney; Johnathan Bach
- Producers: Punctual; Applebaum

Bebe Rexha singles chronology
"Light That Leads Me" (2025)	"New Religion" (2026)	"Sad Girls" (2026)

Faithless singles chronology
"Champion Sound: Side 3 Book of Hours" (2025)	"New Religion" (2026)

Music video
- "New Religion" on YouTube

"New Religion" is a song by Albanian/ American singer Bebe Rexha and British electronic music group Faithless, from Rexha's fourth studio album Dirty Blonde (2026). It was released on March 6, 2026, through Empire Distribution. Commercially, the song reached top 10 in Germany and Belgium and number one on the US Billboard Dance/Mix Show Airplay chart.

== Background and development ==
Released on March 6, 2026, "New Religion" was the third song released in the rollout for Rexha's visual album Dirty Blonde (2026), following "I Like You Better than Me" and "Çike Çike". It marked a new phase in her independent career, following her departure from Warner Records and partnership with EMPIRE Distribution. As part of the album's rollout, Rexha allowed fans to vote on the order in which songs would be released, and their response helped bring "New Religion" forward as the next release.

Rexha had previously collaborated with Faithless on "Dollars and Dimes" (2025), which Sister Bliss later described as an important moment for the group. In a September 2026 interview with Belgian broadcaster RTBF, Bliss explained that Faithless had received requests to remake or sample "Insomnia" for approximately 30 years, but had routinely declined them, often saying no to everyone. The group made an exception for Rexha, whom Bliss described as a "real pop star", praising her as clever, brilliant and an accomplished songwriter. She explained that Rexha's vision of creating something special while introducing "Insomnia" to a younger generation, including listeners who had not been born when Faithless began, played an important role in the decision. Bliss also cited Rexha's career transition to independence and their previous collaboration as factors that ultimately made the difference.

== Composition ==
"New Religion" is a high-energy dance track built around Faithless' 1995 song "Insomnia". It interpolates the original melody and incorporates a portion of the late Maxi Jazz's vocal refrain, "I can't get no sleep", alongside elements of the original production. Rexha specifically requested the original drop, which she was told had been recorded on tape. She described obtaining permission to incorporate the original sounds as a difficult process that took approximately three years.

Rexha recalled first hearing "Insomnia" through her uncle, who was trying to become a DJ, while she was growing up in New York City, although she had not initially intended to remake the song. The concept emerged during a studio session in which she and her collaborators developed an idea around the phrase "new religion", which a friend had introduced to her. Rexha explained that she wanted to write about finding refuge in music during a difficult period involving the major-label system, relationships and other aspects of her life. She also described dancing in European clubs as a spiritual and healing experience. She characterized the song as a “love letter to music” and its ability to make people feel alive again. Sister Bliss similarly explained that the song explored music's healing power and the transition from darkness to light during a period of personal uncertainty as Rexha began her independent career.

The song initially lacked a bridge. After fans called for bridges in her music, Rexha decided to write one herself. She later observed that a preview of the section was gaining traction online, noting that her fans had recognized the importance of including a bridge in the song.

== Critical reception ==
"New Religion" received generally positive reviews from music critics, who praised its high-energy EDM production, the effective interpolation of Faithless' "Insomnia", and its personal theme of music as emotional salvation and unconditional love.

Euphoria Magazine called the song "a song that describes the joys of unconditional love buried in the arms of a catchy EDM melody". Jack Irvin of People described it as a "high-energy dance banger". QNews called it "one of the year’s most addictive club tracks", noting that it "reimagines the iconic 90s dance anthem Insomnia by Faithless, weaving the track’s unmistakable bassline into a slick modern pop-dance production" and that it feels "both nostalgic and fresh".

In a more analytical piece, Medicine Box Mag described the track as "Bebe Rexha's full-throated claim that music saved her the way faith saves a believer", calling it "a devotional anthem" that treats the dancefloor "not as escape but as arrival" and praising its bold comparison of music to religion as genuine rather than stylistic. Culled Culture noted that the song allows Rexha to "profess her undying devotion to the Church of Dance".

Reviewing the parent album Dirty Blonde, Euphoria Magazine identified "New Religion" as "the beating heart of the album" and "one of the strongest moments of her career", highlighting its balance of "90s dance nostalgia with contemporary EDM sensibilities" and its portrayal of music as "a mechanism for survival and personal rebirth". PopMatters acknowledged that "New Religion" "certainly performs well as a thesis statement for a new era for Rexha".

== Accolades ==
"New Religion" earned Rexha her first nomination at a major awards show as an independent artist, receiving a nomination for Best Dance at the 2026 MTV Video Music Awards. The song also received a nomination for International Anthem of the Year at the 2026 BreakTudo Awards in Brazil.

Awards and nominations for "New Religion"
Year	Organization	Award	Result	Ref.
2026	BreakTudo Awards	International Anthem of the Year	Pending	
2026	MTV Video Music Awards	Best Dance	Nominated	

== Commercial performance ==
Upon release, "New Religion" became Rexha's first significant hit throughout Eastern Europe and Latin America in nearly five years. In the United Kingdom, the song peaked at number 41 on the UK Singles Chart, becoming Rexha's highest charting single since "I'm Good (Blue)" (2022). It also reached a peak of number five on the UK Dance chart.

"New Religion" also entered the charts in several European countries, peaking at number 8 in Germany, number 22 in Austria, number 26 in Switzerland, number 62 in Ireland, number 49 in France, number 30 in the Netherlands, number 97 in Sweden and number 8 and 12, respectively, in the Wallonia and Flanders regions of Belgium.

In the United States, "New Religion" debuted at number 11 on the Billboard Hot Dance/Pop Songs chart, with 2.1 million streams. That same week, the song debuted at number 39 on the Billboard Dance/Mix Show Airplay chart, and eventually, it topped the chart on the week of May 9, becoming Rexha's fourth and Faithless' first number-one single.

== Music video ==
The accompanying visual for "New Religion" was published on Rexha's official YouTube channel on March 6, 2026. It combines footage from Faithless' original "Insomnia" music video with newly filmed scenes of Rexha in a nightclub.

Rexha performs alongside backup dancers under dark, metallic lighting, wearing a black plunging outfit, oversized sunglasses and layered necklaces, including cross pendants. The visual juxtaposes contemporary club imagery with footage from "Insomnia", linking Rexha's reinterpretation to the original song.

== Live performances ==
Rexha performed "New Religion" live for the first time on Jimmy Kimmel Live! on March 9, 2026, in Los Angeles. On June 6, she included the song in her set at Capital's Summertime Ball, held at Wembley Stadium in London before an audience of approximately 80,000 people. Her performance was subsequently featured in the event's published set list.

A stripped-back rendition recorded for Genius' Open Mic series was released on digital music platforms on June 11, 2026, under the title "New Religion (Genius Open Mic Live Performance)".

On June 20, Rexha appeared as a headliner on the Super Bock Stage at Rock in Rio Lisboa, held at Parque Tejo in Lisbon, where the song featured in her set. On July 24, she brought it to Tomorrowland, performing on the Freedom Stage; becoming the first American pop star to perform on the stage.

On July 27, Rexha performed a medley of "New Religion" and "Sad Girls" on The Tonight Show Starring Jimmy Fallon. She subsequently appeared at Radio 1 Dance: Malta at Uno Village in Attard, Malta, on August 22, before performing at the Citi Concert Series at Rockefeller Center in New York City on August 28.

On October 23, 2026, Rexha delivered an orchestral rendition at the NRJ Music Awards in Cannes, France, where she was nominated in the International Female Artist category. Directed by Rexha and Arthur Cadre, the performance featured choreographed dancers against a dark, blue-lit backdrop. Albinfo praised Rexha's confidence onstage and vocal control, particularly during the more demanding passages of the performance. A video of the performance was subsequently released on her official YouTube channel on October 27.

== Credits and personnel ==
Credits adapted from Spotify and Tidal.

- Bebe Rexha – lead artist, vocals, executive production, songwriting
- Faithless – featured artists
- Punctual – production, bass, drums, programming, synthesizer
- Neave Applebaum – production, songwriting
- William Lansley – vocal production, songwriting
- John Morgan – bass, drums, synthesizer, songwriting
- Rollo Armstrong – songwriting
- Ayalah Bentovim – songwriting
- Maxwell Fraser – songwriting
- Hannah Berney – songwriting
- Jonathan Bach – songwriting
- Jake Torrey – songwriting
- Dominic Perfetti – songwriting
- Alex Novodor – songwriting
- Daniel Cullen – recording engineer, vocal production
- Ghazi – mixing
- Kevin Grainger – mixing, mastering
- Alex Gomme – assistant mixing engineer
- Alex Lee – assistant recording engineer
- Cameron Hogan – assistant recording engineer
- Jake Rene – assistant recording engineer

== Charts ==
=== Weekly charts ===
Weekly chart performance
Chart (2026)	Peak position
Argentina Anglo Airplay (Monitor Latino)	19
Australia Airplay (RCS)	3
Australia Dance (ARIA)	17
Austria (Ö3 Austria Top 40)	21
Austria Airplay (MusicTrace)	1
Belarus Airplay (TopHit)	1
Belgium (Ultratop 50 Flanders)	12
Belgium (Ultratop 50 Wallonia)	8
Bolivia Anglo Airplay (Monitor Latino)	6
Bulgaria Airplay (PROPHON)	5
Canada CHR/Top 40 (Billboard)	37
Central America Anglo Airplay (Monitor Latino)	10
Chile Anglo Airplay (Monitor Latino)	6
CIS Airplay (TopHit)	1
Costa Rica Anglo Airplay (Monitor Latino)	8
Croatia International Airplay (Top lista)	1
Czech Republic Airplay (ČNS IFPI)	10
Czech Republic Singles Digital (ČNS IFPI)	86
Dominican Republic Anglo Airplay (Monitor Latino)	11
Ecuador Anglo Airplay (Monitor Latino)	5
El Salvador Anglo Airplay (Monitor Latino)	1
Estonia Airplay (TopHit)	2
Finland Airplay (Radiosoittolista)	1
France (SNEP)	49
Germany (GfK)	8
Germany Dance (DBC)	19
Global Dance Radio (Billboard/WARM)	1
Global Excl. US (Billboard)	170
Greece International (IFPI)	49
Greece Airplay (IFPI)	13
Hungary (Dance Top 40)	1
Hungary (Rádiós Top 40)	2
Ireland (IRMA)	62
Italy Airplay (EarOne)	68
Kazakhstan Airplay (TopHit)	3
Latin America Anglo Airplay (Monitor Latino)	11
Latvia Airplay (LaIPA)	1
Lithuania (AGATA)	55
Lithuania Airplay (TopHit)	1
Malta Airplay (Radiomonitor)	4
Mexico Anglo Airplay (Monitor Latino)	6
Moldova Airplay (TopHit)	1
Netherlands (Dutch Top 40)	6
Netherlands (Single Top 100)	30
Netherlands Airplay (Dutch Charts)	10
New Zealand Hot Singles (RMNZ)	10
Nicaragua Anglo Airplay (Monitor Latino)	1
Nigeria Airplay (TurnTable)	93
North Macedonia Airplay (Radiomonitor)	8
Norway (IFPI Norge)	82
Norway Airplay (IFPI Norge)	23
Panama Anglo Airplay (Monitor Latino)	7
Paraguay Anglo Airplay (Monitor Latino)	4
Peru Anglo Airplay (Monitor Latino)	12
Poland Airplay (OLiS)	1
Poland Streaming (OLiS)	75
Portugal Airplay (AFP)	28
Romania Airplay (UPFR)	4
Romania Airplay (Media Forest)	1
Romania TV Airplay (Media Forest)	17
Russia Airplay (TopHit)	1
Serbia Airplay (Radiomonitor)	5
Slovakia Airplay (ČNS IFPI)	2
Slovakia Singles Digital (ČNS IFPI)	40
Slovenia Airplay (Radiomonitor)	2
Sweden (Sverigetopplistan)	97
Sweden Dance (Sverigetopplistan)	4
Switzerland (Schweizer Hitparade)	26
Turkey International Airplay (Radiomonitor Türkiye)	1
Ukraine Airplay (TopHit)	1
UK Singles (Official Charts)	41
UK Dance (Official Charts)	5
UK Independent (Official Charts)	7
Uruguay Anglo Airplay (Monitor Latino)	9
US Dance Airplay (Billboard)	1
US Digital Song Sales (Billboard)	12
US Hot Dance/Pop Songs (Billboard)	11
US Pop Airplay (Billboard)	29
US Rhythmic Airplay (Billboard)	33
Venezuela Anglo Airplay (Monitor Latino)	3

=== Monthly charts ===
Monthly chart performance
Chart (2026)	Peak position
Belarus Airplay (TopHit)	1
CIS Airplay (TopHit)	1
Estonia Airplay (TopHit)	3
Kazakhstan Airplay (TopHit)	3
Latvia Airplay (TopHit)	2
Lithuania Airplay (TopHit)	1
Moldova Airplay (TopHit)	1
Paraguay Airplay (SGP)	87
Romania Airplay (TopHit)	3
Russia Airplay (TopHit)	1
Ukraine Airplay (TopHit)	2

== Certifications ==
Certifications for "New Religion"
Region	Certification	Certified units/sales
France (SNEP)	Gold	100,000^{‡}
United Kingdom (BPI)	Silver	200,000^{‡}
Streaming
Slovakia (ČNS IFPI)	Gold	850,000^{†}
^{‡} Sales+streaming figures based on certification alone.^{†} Streaming-only figures based on certification alone.

== Release history ==
Release dates and formats for "New Religion"
Region	Date	Format	Label	Ref.
Various	March 6, 2026	Digital download; streaming	Empire	
Italy	March 9, 2026	Radio airplay	Empire	
United States	March 10, 2026	Contemporary hit radio	Empire	

== See also ==
- List of Billboard number-one dance songs of 2026
