= Billboard Canada Women in Music =

Canadian music award

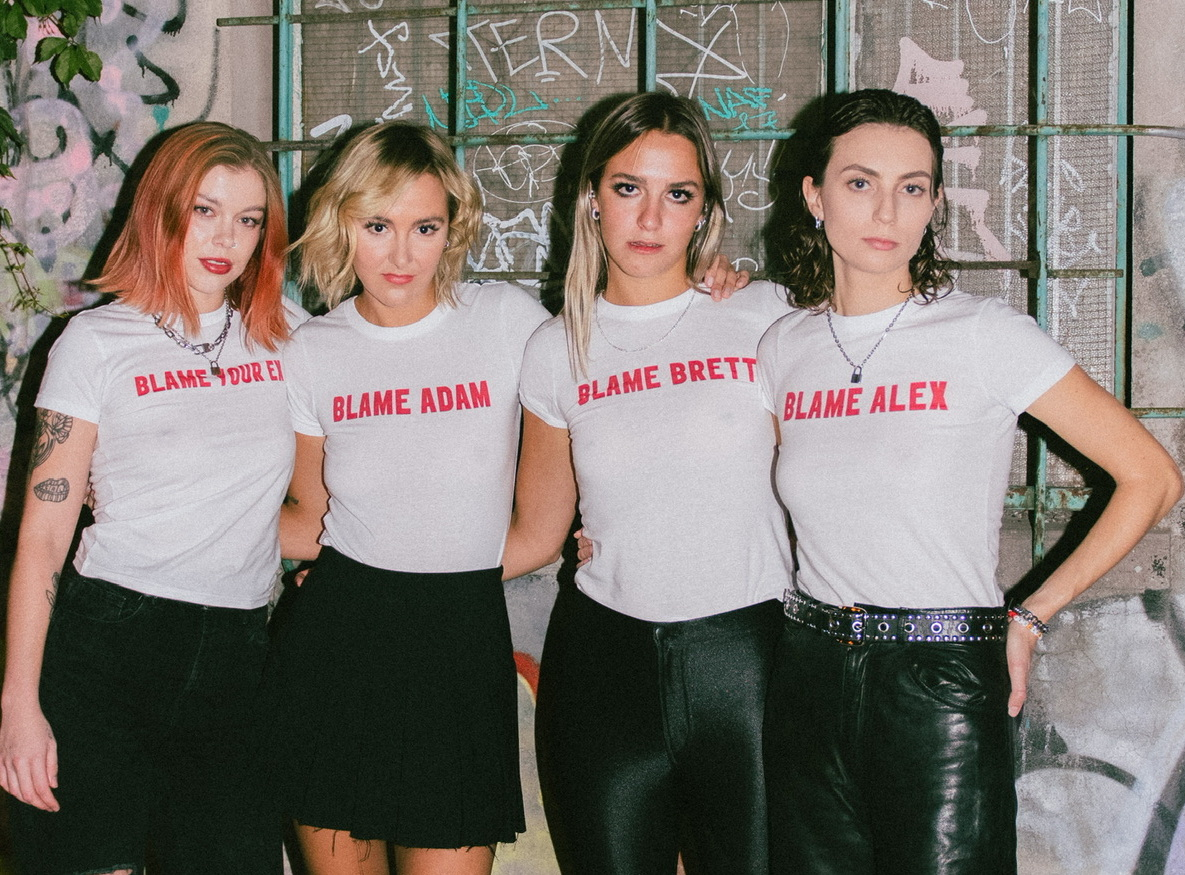
- The Beaches, most recent Woman of the Year honoree.
- Awarded for: Contributions to the Canadian music industry by women
- Sponsored by: iHeartRadio Canada, INK Entertainment
- Country: Canada
- Presented by: Billboard Canada
- First award: 2024
- Currently held by: The Beaches (Woman of the Year)

Billboard Canada Women in Music is an annual event by Billboard Canada. The Canadian edition of Billboard Women in Music event, it would "honor the most influential women in Canadian music," according to the magazine. Like its American counterpart, the main award is titled Woman of the Year.

== History ==
After the first edition of the Billboard Women in Music in 2007, the awards were given to artists from every nationality who gained achievements in the magazine's charts. In 2023 the publication launched the first international award outside the United States, the Billboard Latin Women in Music, specifically for Latin music. In 2024 Billboard Women in Music introduced the Global Force Award, given to "singers, songwriters, instrumentalists and producers making groundbreaking contributions to the music industry" selected by Billboard publication around the world. Since that Billboard extended the Women in Music ceremony to the individual international territories in which the magazine is published, including Billboard Canada.

== Woman of the Year ==
Billboard Canada Woman of the Year for 2024 is givent to "a canadian recording artist who has exemplified leadership and social progress in the changing music business".

- 2024: Charlotte Cardin
- 2025: The Beaches

== Global Hitmaker Award ==
- 2026: Bebe Rexha

== Group of the Year ==
- 2024: The Beaches

== Breakthrough Artist of the Year ==
- 2024: Allison Russell
- 2025: Noeline Hofmann

== Icon Award ==
Billboard Canada Icon Award is given to "a canadian female artist of extraordinary accomplishment, who has made historic contributions to the industry and artistry".

- 2024: Alanis Morissette

== Visionary Award ==
- 2025: Lights

== Trailblazer Award ==
- 2025: Cœur de pirate

== Innovator Award ==
- 2025: Charlotte Day Wilson

== Champion Award ==
- 2025: Meg Symsyk

== Rising Star Award ==
- 2024: Lu Kala
- 2025: Julia Wolf

== Producer of the Year ==
- 2025: WondaGurl

== Executive of the Year ==
- 2025: Julie Adam

== See also ==
- Billboard Women in Music
