= Jacob Jonas =

American choreographer and artistic director

- Born: Los Angeles, California, U.S.
- Occupations: Choreographer, filmmaker, artistic director
- Organization(s): Jacob Jonas The Company, Films.Dance
- Website: jacobjonas.com

Jacob Jonas is an American choreographer, filmmaker, and artistic director based in Los Angeles. He is the founder and artistic director of the nonprofit organization Jacob Jonas The Company and the global film platform Films.Dance. His multidisciplinary work bridges dance, film, architecture, nature, health, and public space.

== Early life and education ==
A third-generation native of Los Angeles, Jonas began dancing at age 13 after performing with the Calypso Tumblers street troupe on the Venice Beach Boardwalk. He was mentored by Raymond Bartlette, popper Vincent "Mr. Animation" Foster, and choreographer Donald Byrd.

== Career ==
In 2014, Jonas co-founded Jacob Jonas The Company with Jill Wilson and lighting designer Will Adashek. The company blends street styles, ballet, acrobatics, and contemporary dance, and performs in both traditional theaters and nontraditional public venues. He has choreographed over 30 original works, which have been performed at the Wallis Annenberg Center for the Performing Arts, The Ford, The Kennedy Center (invited by Yo-Yo Ma for the Arts Summit), Lincoln Center, and the Hollywood Bowl.

He also produced a recurring public dance festival called *To the Sea: Dance Concerts on the Pier*, which highlighted artists across genres and backgrounds.

In 2014, Jonas launched #CamerasandDancers, a monthly social media initiative bringing together dancers and photographers for site-specific collaborations. The project partnered with institutions including The Getty, The Met, The Whitney, The Kennedy Center, and the Swiss National Museum in Zurich.

During the COVID-19 pandemic, Jonas and JJTC presented "PARKED", a socially distanced performance at Santa Monica Airport where dancers performed in masks and audiences watched from their cars.

In 2020, Jonas launched Films.Dance, a global film initiative bringing together choreographers, dancers, musicians, and filmmakers from over 25 countries. The series featured more than 40 short films and included artists such as Hilary Hahn, Desmond Richardson, Sara Mearns, Antonio Sanchez, and Jamar Roberts. It has received more than 10 million views across platforms.

== Commercial work ==
Jonas has collaborated with Kanye West, Sia, Rosalía, Elton John, SZA, Patrick Watson, Imogen Heap, and Elyanna. He has directed or choreographed campaigns and commissions for Gucci, Gap, Apple, Mastercard, James Perse, and Sony.

== Recognition and awards ==
Jonas's work has been featured on Nowness and recognized by the Young Directors Awards, Berlin Commercial Awards, Camerimage, San Francisco Dance Film Festival, and the Lincoln Center Dance on Camera Festival.

He was named one of Dance Magazine's "25 to Watch" in 2018.

He is the recipient of the Santa Monica Bruria Finkel Award for artistic innovation and civic engagement.

== Artistic style and philosophy ==
Jonas's choreography integrates contemporary ballet, street dance, and acrobatics, often using the body as a sculptural and architectural form. Following his recovery from stage IV lymphoma, Jonas began developing frameworks of movement rooted in science and health, particularly cellular behavior and transformation.

== Personal life ==
Jonas is a survivor of stage IV diffuse large B-cell lymphoma, which has shaped his creative philosophy and interdisciplinary practice, particularly his interest in connecting movement, medicine, and storytelling.
