= Timofey Reznikov =

Belgian music producer (born 1981)

Timofey Reznikov Тимофей Резников
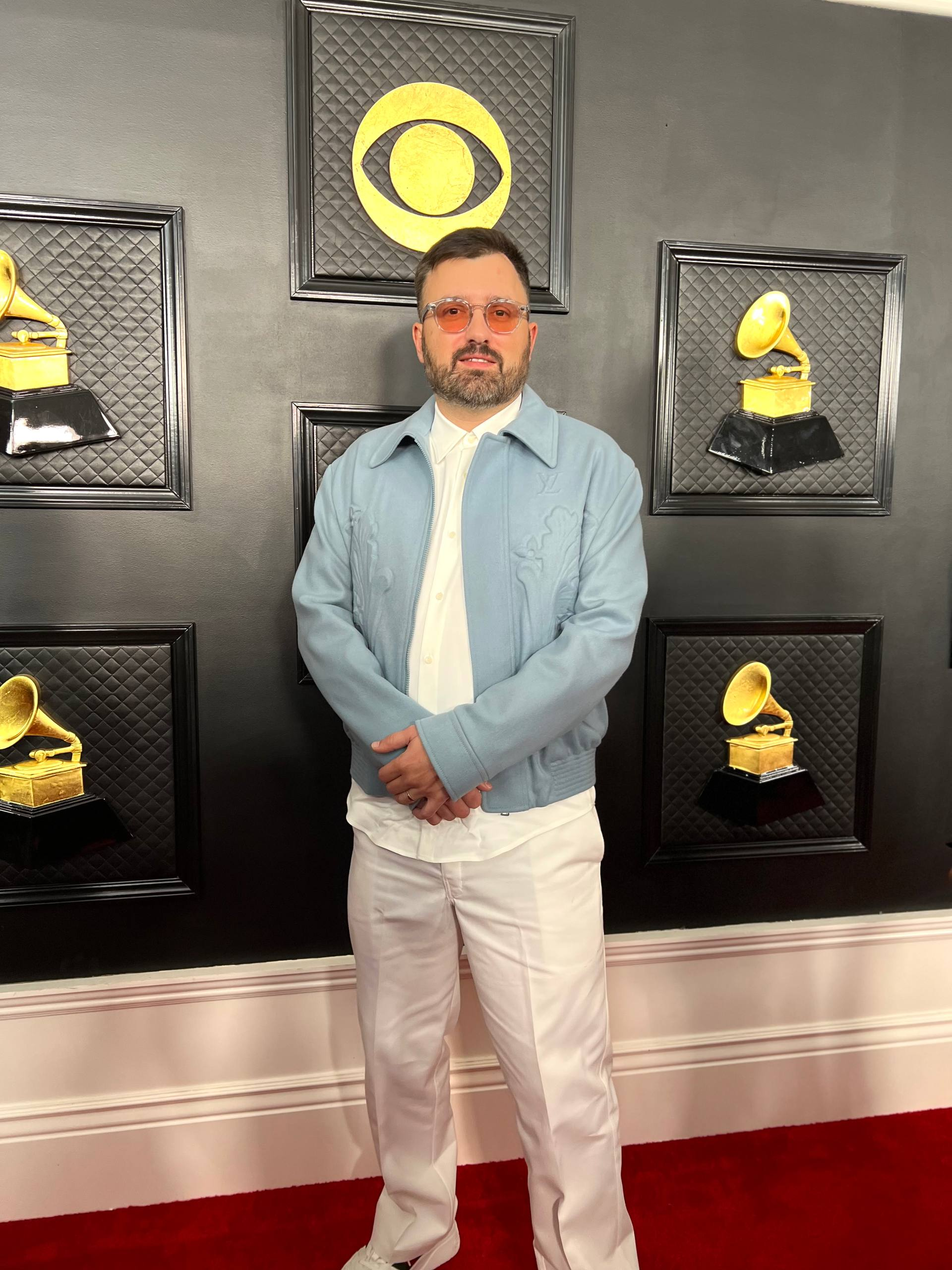
- Timofey Reznikov on the red carpet at the 65th Grammy Awards (2023)

Background information
- Also known as: Timofey
- Born: 14 July 1981 (age 44); Saratov, Russian SFSR, Soviet Union
- Origin: Brussels, Belgium
- Genres: EDM; dance-pop; pop
- Occupations: Music producer; songwriter; sound designer; mixing engineer; mastering engineer
- Instruments: Ableton Live; keyboards; piano; trumpet
- Years active: 1999–present
- Website: timofeyreznikov.com

Timofey Reznikov (Russian: Тимофей Резников; born July 14, 1981) is a Belgian music producer, songwriter, sound designer, mixing engineer and mastering engineer from Brussels. Reznikov is best known for his music production and mixing work for David Guetta, as well as for Regi, Dimitri Vegas & Like Mike, among others. In 2022, he was nominated for the 65th Annual Grammy Awards' Best Dance/Electronic Recording category for his production work on the David Guetta single "I'm Good (Blue)", featuring Bebe Rexha.

== Early life ==
Reznikov was born on 14 July 1981 in Saratov, Soviet Russia. His mother was a violinist in an orchestra and his father taught contrabass at a conservatoire. He initially studied jazz trumpet before enrolling aged 20 at the Conservatoire Royal de Mons in Belgium to study piano and electro-acoustic music.

== Career ==
In 2018, Reznikov spent two months at Serenity Studios, working with French DJ and producer David Guetta on his seventh studio album. Reznikov gained a production credit on the single "Don't Leave Me Alone" (featuring Anne-Marie) and additionally co-wrote and co-produced several songs on disc two of the album, known as the Jack Back project. Following this, Reznikov went on to collaborate with several artists, most notably Belgian DJ Regi, with whom he was involved in the production of the single "Kom Wat Dichterbij". Reznikov also co-produced Guetta's 2019 single "Stay (Don't Go Away)" featuring Raye and recently produced, mixed and mastered Guetta's single, "I'm Good (Blue)" featuring Bebe Rexha.

== Awards and nominations ==
=== Grammy Awards ===
Year	Nominee / work	Award	Result	Ref.
2023	"I'm Good (Blue)" (with Bebe Rexha) (as producer)	Best Dance/Electronic Recording	Nominated	
2024	"One in a Million" (as producer)	Best Pop Dance Recording	Nominated	

== Discography ==
Year	Title	Artists	Album	Credit	Ref.
2026	Save Me Tonight	David Guetta,Jennifer Lopez	Non-album singles	Co-writer, producer, programmer	
2025	"Forever Young"	David Guetta, Alphaville, Ava Max	Non-album singles	Producer, mixer	
2025	"Beautiful People"	David Guetta, Sia	Non-album singles	Producer, writer, mixer	
2025	"Lighter"	David Guetta, A7S, WizKid	Non-album singles	Producer, writer, mixer	
2025	"Together"	David Guetta, Hypaton, Bonnie Tyler	Non-album singles	Producer, writer, mixer	
2024	"I Don't Wanna Wait"	David Guetta, One Republic	Non-album singles	Producer, writer, mixer	
2023	"One in a Million"	Bebe Rexha, David Guetta	Non-album singles	Producer, writer	
2023	"When We Were Young (The Logical Song)"	David Guetta, Kim Petras	Non-album singles	Producer, mixer, mastering	
2022	"I'm Good (Blue)"	David Guetta, Bebe Rexha	Non-album singles	Producer, mixer, mastering	
2022	"Family Affair (Dance for Me)"	David Guetta	Non-album singles	Producer, mixer, mastering	
2022	"Feeling"	Jack Back	Non-album singles	Producer, mixer, mastering	
2021	"If You Really Love Me (How Will I Know)"	David Guetta, MistaJam, John Newman	Non-album singles	Producer, mixer, mastering	
2020	"Superstar DJ"	Jack Back	Non-album singles	Producer, mixer, mastering	
2019	"Stay (Don't Go Away)"	David Guetta, Raye	Non-album singles	Producer, mixer, mastering, composer	
2019	"Put Your Phone Down (Low)"	Jack Back	"Survivor / Put Your Phone Down (Low)"	Producer	
2019	"Summer Life"	Regi	Non-album single	Producer	
2018	"Don't Leave Me Alone"	David Guetta, Anne-Marie	7	Producer, writer	
2018	"Reach for Me"	David Guetta	7	Producer	
2018	"Freedom"	David Guetta	7	Producer	
2018	"Overtone"	David Guetta	7	Producer	
2018	"Back and Forth"	David Guetta	7	Producer	
2018	"All I Need"	Dimitri Vegas & Like Mike, Gucci Mane	Non-album singles	Producer, mixer	
2018	"Ellie"	Regi	Non-album singles	Producer	
