= One in a Million (Bebe Rexha and David Guetta song) =

2023 single by Bebe Rexha and David Guetta

Single by Bebe Rexha and David Guetta
- Released: August 4, 2023
- Genre: House; EDM; pop
- Length: 2:40
- Label: Warner
- Songwriters: Bebe Rexha; David Guetta; Burns; Martin Coogan; Scott Dittrich; Timofey Reznikov; Sarah Solovay; Ido Zmishlany
- Producers: David Guetta; Burns; Timofey Reznikov

Bebe Rexha singles chronology
"If Only I" (2023)	"One in a Million" (2023)	"Heart Still Beating" (2023)

David Guetta singles chronology
"Something to Hold On To" (2023)	"One in a Million" (2023)	"On My Love" (2023)

Music video
- "One in a Million" on YouTube

"One in a Million" is a song by American singer Bebe Rexha and French record producer David Guetta. The song was written by Rexha, Burns, Martin Coogan, Scott Dittrich, Timofey Reznikov, Sarah Solovay and Ido Zmishlany, and produced by Burns, Reznikov, and Guetta, all three of whom also wrote the song. The fifth collaboration between Rexha and Guetta, it was released for digital download and streaming in various countries by Warner on August 4, 2023. The EDM and pop song samples Guetta's 2009 single "When Love Takes Over". In its lyrics, Rexha marvels at the existence of her significant other.

"One in a Million" received positive reviews from music critics for its music, production and Rexha's vocal delivery. The song reached number nine on the U.S. Billboard Hot Dance/Electronic Songs chart and number 79 on the UK Singles Chart. The cyberspace and futuristic-themed music video premiered on Rexha's YouTube channel on September 26, 2023. The song was nominated in the inaugural category of Best Pop Dance Recording at the 66th Annual Grammy Awards. Rexha and Guetta performed the song live at the Billboard Music Awards and the closing ceremony of the 2023 FIFA Club World Cup.

== Background and composition ==
In April 2023, Rexha shared a brief snippet of "One in a Million" on the social media platform TikTok. Warner released it for digital download and streaming in various countries on August 4, 2023. Produced by Timofey Reznikov, Guetta and Burns, the song was written by the latter two along with Rexha, Martin Coogan, Scott Dittrich, Timofey Reznikov, Sarah Solovay and Ido Zmishlany. The song marks the fifth collaboration between Rexha and Guetta following their songs "Hey Mama" (2015), "Say My Name" (2018), "Family" (2021) and "I'm Good (Blue)" (2022). Inspired by house music, "One In A Million" is an EDM and pop song that samples Guetta's collaboration with American singer Kelly Rowland "When Love Takes Over" (2009). The song's lyrics are a homage to love, wherein Rexha marvels at the existence of a significant other, placing emphasis on the exploration of profound connections. Exploring the essence of trust, Rexha conveys her emotions through lines such as, "You're my one, one, one in a million. It's like someone picked you outta the sky. Maybe I met you for a reason."

== Reception ==
Upon its release, "One in a Million" garnered a positive reception from music critics. Chris Vuoncino from We Rave You highlighted the song for its quality that encapsulates the "iconic" collaboration between Rexha and Guetta. He also acclaimed its "timeless" melody and lyrics, Rexha's "radio-friendly" vocal delivery and Guetta's "pristine" production quality. Emily Zemler for Rolling Stone commended the collaborative effort as "buoyant", acknowledging its "anthemtic and club-ready" qualities. Juan Ignacio Herrero of Los 40 positioned the song as a potential "summer anthem" and labeled it a "sequel" to Guetta's previous song, "When Love Takes Over". Isidora González also from Los 40 identified the song's distinctive features, describing them as a "pure expression" with "stimulating" beats, "powerful" vocals and "cheerful" melodies. Jovi Marques for Papelpop complimented the song's dynamic progression and Rexha's "electrifying" vocals. A critic from NRJ hailed the collaborative evolution between the artists on their success with "I'm Good (Blue)", noting that the song "seamlessly continues" the path set by its predecessor. Representing Rexha's fourth and Guetta's 13th nomination to date, the song garnered a nomination in the inaugural category of Best Pop Dance Recording at the 66th edition of the Grammy Awards.

"One in a Million" made its debut at number 9 on the US Billboard Hot Dance/Electronic Songs chart in the issue dated August 19, 2023. In the United Kingdom, the song reached number 79 on the UK Singles Chart, while achieving a higher position at number 30 on the UK Dance Singles Chart. Reaching the top 30 in Belgium and the Netherlands, it peaked at number 41 in Slovakia, number 55 in the Czech Republic, number 57 in Poland, number 58 in the Croatia, number 105 in the Commonwealth of Independent States (CIS) and number 122 in Russia. Additionally, Billboard showcased "One in a Million" in its annual compilation of the top Hot Dance/Electronic songs for 2023.

Furthermore, the song secured the sixth position on BuzzFeed's list of Best Underrated Songs of 2023 and was included on Billboard's 30 Best Dance Songs of the year.

Select year-end rankings and listicles for One in a Million
Publication	List	Rank	Ref.
Billboard	The 30 Best Dance Tracks of 2023	Placed	
BuzzFeed	Best Underrated Songs of 2023	6th	
Chart Beats	The Best Songs of 2023	16th	
EDM Lab	The 10 Best Dance Tracks of 2023	9th	
The Nocturnal Times	Top Electronic/Dance Songs of 2023	Placed	
Your Music Charts	The 50 Best EDM Songs of 2023	31st	

== Promotion ==
An official music video for "One in a Million" premiered to Rexha's official YouTube channel on September 26, 2023. A cyberspace and futuristic-themed video, it was directed by Corey Wilson and produced by Erica Gould. The video commences with a camera glide from Rexha's shoulder, capturing her interaction with a phone displaying the video. The visual then advances as the camera transitions into virtual environments, presenting Rexha within a turquoise setting illuminated by ascending laser lights. This is followed by a scene in a black environment where she is surrounded by descending laser lights of various colors. The narrative unfolds further as the camera introduces Guetta throughout a digital projection in a dark backdrop, engaging in a performance complemented by synchronised white lines moving in harmony with the beat. The visual narrative persists with interspersed shots depicting Rexha within the aforementioned settings, accompanied by dynamic transitions in the colors of the lights. Tomás Mier from Rolling Stone cited the video as an exploration of "love in cyberspace" and noted its resonance following the substantial success of "I'm Good (Blue)". André Luiz of Papelpop highlighted the futuristic theme, where Rexha exudes confidence and "showcases her beauty" across various scenes. On November 19, 2023, Rexha and Guetta premiered their collaboration "One in a Million" for the first time at the Billboard Music Awards. Another live rendition from both artists occurred at the closing ceremony of the FIFA Club World Cup in Saudi Arabia.

== Charts ==
=== Weekly charts ===
Weekly chart performance for "One in a Million"
Chart (2023–24)	Peak position
Australia (ARIA)	98
Belarus Airplay (TopHit)	100
Belgium (Ultratop 50 Flanders)	26
Belgium (Ultratop 50 Wallonia)	27
CIS Airplay (TopHit)	100
Croatia International Airplay (Top lista)	58
Czech Republic Airplay (ČNS IFPI)	55
Estonia Airplay (TopHit)	4
Hungary (Dance Top 40)	8
Hungary (Rádiós Top 40)	3
Latvia Airplay (TopHit)	24
Lithuania Airplay (TopHit)	29
Netherlands (Dutch Top 40)	13
Netherlands (Single Top 100)	28
New Zealand Hot Singles (RMNZ)	6
Poland (Polish Airplay Top 100)	57
Russia Airplay (TopHit)	128
San Marino (SMRRTV Top 50)	19
Slovakia Airplay (ČNS IFPI)	41
Sweden Heatseeker (Sverigetopplistan)	7
UK Singles (Official Charts)	79
UK Dance (Official Charts)	30
US Dance Airplay (Billboard)	8
US Hot Dance/Electronic Songs (Billboard)	9

=== Monthly charts ===
Monthly chart performance for "One in a Million"
Chart (2024)	Peak position
Estonia Airplay (TopHit)	6
Latvia Airplay (TopHit)	22
Lithuania Airplay (TopHit)	38

=== Year-end charts ===
2023 year-end chart performance for "One in a Million"
Chart (2023)	Position
Estonia Airplay (TopHit)	43
Lithuania Airplay (TopHit)	125
Netherlands (Dutch Top 40)	50
US Hot Dance/Electronic Songs (Billboard)	55

2024 year-end chart performance for "One in a Million"
Chart (2024)	Position
Estonia Airplay (TopHit)	112
Hungary (Dance Top 40)	40
Hungary (Rádiós Top 40)	87

2025 year-end chart performance for "One in a Million"
Chart (2025)	Position
Hungary (Dance Top 40)	54

== Release history ==
Release dates and formats for "One in a Million"
Region	Date	Format(s)	Label	Ref.
Various	August 4, 2023	Digital download; streaming	Warner	
France	August 4, 2023	Radio airplay	Warner	
United Kingdom	August 4, 2023	Digital download; streaming	Warner	
Italy	August 11, 2023	Radio airplay	Warner	
