= List of songs written by Louis Tomlinson =

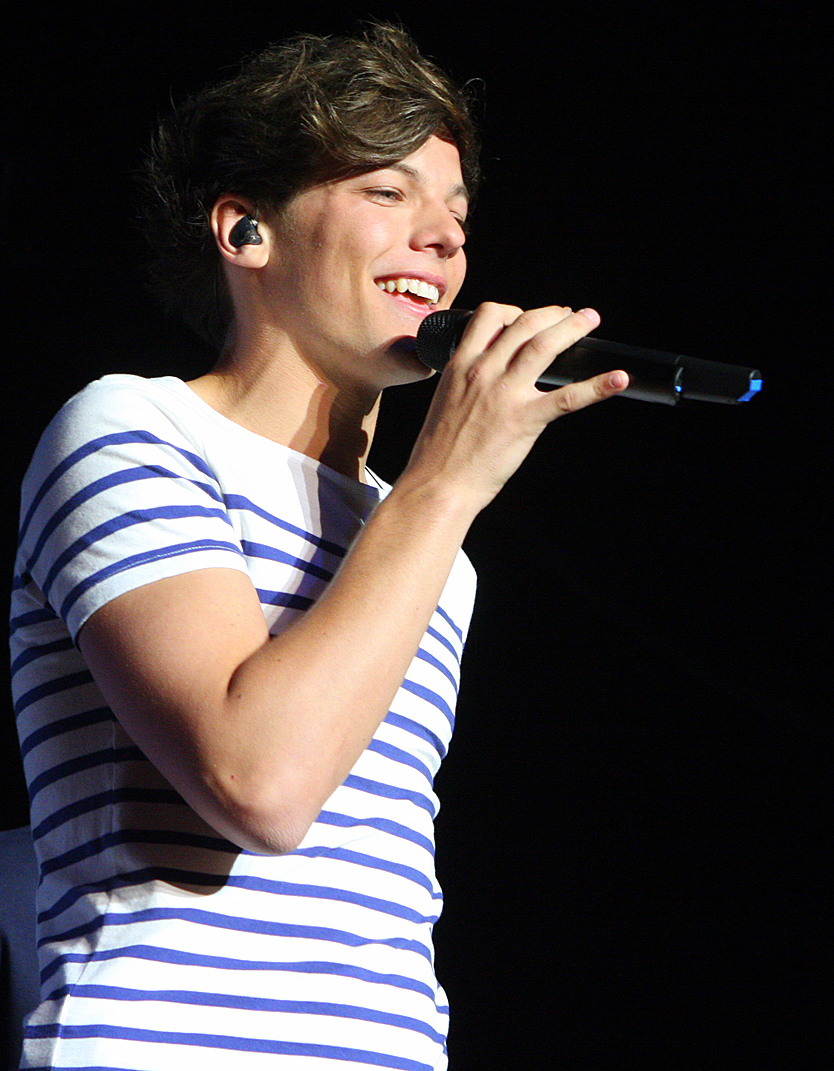
Tomlinson performing at Hordern Pavilion in Sydney, Australia as part of the Up All Night Tour in 2012

English singer-songwriter Louis Tomlinson has writing credits on over 90 songs, seven of which have appeared in the top 10 of the UK singles chart. (Note: As a solo artist: "Just Hold On" and "Back to You"; As a part of One Direction: "Story of My Life", "Steal My Girl", "Night Changes", "Perfect", and "History") He has written tracks on all of his studio albums, Walls (2020), Faith in the Future (2022), and How Did I Get Here? (2026), and for his former band One Direction.

After co-writing songs on the One Direction albums Up All Night (2011) and Take Me Home (2012), Tomlinson became more prominent as a writer for Midnight Memories (2013). He has credits on 9 tracks out of the 14 on the standard edition and 3 of 4 in the deluxe version. "Story of My Life", the album's second single, peaked at number 2 on the UK singles chart and sold over 3 million copies in the United States. "Diana" topped iTunes charts worldwide upon release and peaked at number 11 on the Billboard Hot 100.

For the album Four (2014), Tomlinson co-wrote the lead single "Steal My Girl", which peaked at number 3 on the UK singles chart. He was a principal writer of "No Control", which became the subject of a fan campaign to be released as a single and to reach number 1 on the UK single charts. Fans started the campaign to show support for Tomlinson after a feud with producer Naughty Boy on Twitter, with the song being chosen because Tomlinson was a primary writer alongside band member Liam Payne. "Night Changes" was written by Tomlinson with all four other original band members, as well as Jamie Scott, Julian Bunetta, and John Ryan. Following Payne's death in October 2024, the song, along with the rest of One Direction's discography, experienced a surge in streams. The song eventually peaked at number 6 on the UK singles chart. Tomlinson has writing credits on more than half of the tracks on the group's final album Made in the A.M. (2015), including "Perfect", "What a Feeling", "Love You Goodbye", and "History". "History" was the band's final single before going on an indefinite hiatus.

Tomlinson co-wrote his first solo single "Just Hold On" with Steve Aoki, Eric Rosse, Sasha Alex Sloan, and Nolan Lambroza. The song peaked at number 2 on the UK singles chart, becoming Tomlinson's highest-charting song as of August 2025. "Back to You", his second solo single, was also co-written by him and peaked at number 8 on the UK singles chart. Tomlinson has credits on every track from both his debut studio album and his second studio album, the latter of which debuted at number 1 on the UK Albums Chart. Other than One Direction and himself, Tomlinson co-wrote "Changes" by musician Blackbear from his 2019 album Anonymous, "Love Shot" by Chinese-South Korean boy band Exo from their 2018 album Don't Mess Up My Tempo, and the 2023 single "POS" by musician Sueco.

Of the band members, Tomlinson has the most writing credits for One Direction's discography. He has said that this made him feel "ownership" in his career for the first time, adding that within the first two and a half years of the band, he felt as though he lacked influence. He and Payne are considered the main songwriters for One Direction, with Payne having the second-most credits. Critics for several publications have praised Tomlinson's songwriting, including Rania Aniftos for Billboard, Alex Hopper for American Songwriter, Brian Mansfield for USA Today, and Alim Kheraj for The Guardian.

== Songs ==
Key
| † | Indicates single release |
| # | Indicates promotional single release |

List of songs
| Song | Artist(s) | Writer(s) | Album | Year | Ref. |
|---|---|---|---|---|---|
| "A.M." | One Direction | Louis Tomlinson; Julian Bunetta; Ed Drewett; Wayne Hector; Niall Horan; Liam Payne; John Ryan; Harry Styles | Made in the A.M. (Deluxe Edition) | 2015 | |
| "Adeline" | —N/a | Louis Tomlinson; Liam Payne; Tim Rice-Oxley | —N/a | Unreleased | |
| "Alive" | One Direction | Louis Tomlinson; Julian Bunetta; Jamie Scott; John Ryan | Midnight Memories | 2013 | |
| "All This Time" | Louis Tomlinson | Louis Tomlinson; Fred Ball; James Vincent McMorrow; Jay Mooncie | Faith in the Future | 2022 | |
| "Angels Fly" | Louis Tomlinson | Louis Tomlinson; Robert Harvey; Richard Parkhouse; George Tizzard | Faith in the Future | 2022 | |
| "Back for You" | One Direction | Louis Tomlinson; Carl Falk; Kristoffer Fogelmark; Niall Horan; Savan Kotecha; Albin Nedler; Liam Payne; Harry Styles; Rami Yacoub | Take Me Home | 2012 | |
| "Back to You" † | Louis Tomlinson; Bebe Rexha; Digital Farm Animals | Louis Tomlinson; Sarah Blanchard; Richard Boardman; Pablo Bowman; Nicholas Gale | Non-album single | 2017 | |
| "Better Than Words" | One Direction | Louis Tomlinson; Julian Bunetta; Jamie Scott; Liam Payne; John Ryan | Midnight Memories | 2013 | |
| "Bigger Than Me" † | Louis Tomlinson | Louis Tomlinson; Robert Harvey; Richard Parkhouse; George Tizzard | Faith in the Future | 2022 | |
| "Broken Bones" | Louis Tomlinson | Louis Tomlinson; Rob Harvey; Nicolas Rebscher | How Did I Get Here? | 2026 | |
| "Can We Talk?" | —N/a | Louis Tomlinson; Tom Barnes; Peter Kelleher; Benjamin Kohn; Camille Angelina Purcell | —N/a | Unreleased | |
| "Change" | Louis Tomlinson | Louis Tomlinson; Robert Harvey; Richard Parkhouse; George Tizzard | Faith in the Future (Digital Deluxe Bonus Edition) | 2022 | |
| "Change Your Ticket" | One Direction | Louis Tomlinson; Julian Bunetta; Niall Horan; Zayn Malik; Sam Martin; Liam Payne; John Ryan; Harry Styles | Four (The Ultimate Edition) | 2014 | |
| "Changes" | Blackbear | Louis Tomlinson; Stuart Crichton; Joe Kirkland; Matthew Musto; James Newman | Anonymous | 2019 | |
| "Chicago" | Louis Tomlinson | Louis Tomlinson; Dave Gibson | Faith in the Future | 2022 | |
| "Clouds" | One Direction | Louis Tomlinson; Julian Bunetta; Zayn Malik; Jamie Scott; Liam Payne; John Ryan | Four | 2014 | |
| "Common People" | Louis Tomlinson | Louis Tomlinson; Fred Ball; James Vincent McMorrow; Jay Mooncie | Faith in the Future | 2022 | |
| "Copy of a Copy of a Copy (Live from Lima)" | Louis Tomlinson | Louis Tomlinson; Duck Blackwell; Matthew Dinnadge; Andrew Jackson | Faith in the Future (Target exclusive CD) | 2022 | |
| "Dark to Light" | Louis Tomlinson | Louis Tomlinson; Dave Gibson; Nicolas Rebscher | How Did I Get Here? | 2026 | |
| "Defenceless" | Louis Tomlinson | Louis Tomlinson; Sean Douglas; Joe Janiak | Walls | 2020 | |
| "Der Allererste Kuss (The Very First Kiss)" | —N/a | Louis Tomlinson; Julian Bunetta; Niall Horan; Zayn Malik; Liam Payne; John Ryan; Harry Styles; Norman Weichselbaum | —N/a | Unreleased | |
| "Diana" # | One Direction | Louis Tomlinson; Julian Bunetta; Jamie Scott; Liam Payne; John Ryan | Midnight Memories | 2013 | |
| "Does He Know" | One Direction | Louis Tomlinson; Julian Bunetta; Jamie Scott; Liam Payne; John Ryan | Midnight Memories | 2013 | |
| "Don't Forget to Remember Me" | —N/a | Louis Tomlinson; Toby Gad; Niall Horan; Zayn Malik; Liam Payne; Lindy Robbins; Harry Styles | —N/a | Unreleased | |
| "Don't Let It Break Your Heart" † | Louis Tomlinson | Louis Tomlinson; Stuart Crichton; Cole Citrenbaum; James Newman; Stephen Wrabel | Walls | 2020 | |
| "End of the Day" | One Direction | Louis Tomlinson; Julian Bunetta; Ed Drewett; Wayne Hector; Jacob Kasher Hindlin; Gamal Lewis; Liam Payne; John Ryan | Made in the A.M. | 2015 | |
| "Everything About You" | One Direction | Louis Tomlinson; Wayne Hector; Niall Horan; Zayn Malik; Liam Payne; Steve Robson; Harry Styles | Up All Night | 2011 | |
| "Face The Music" | Louis Tomlinson | Louis Tomlinson; Dave Gibson | Faith in the Future | 2022 | |
| "Fearless" | Louis Tomlinson | Louis Tomlinson; Ed Drewett; Abascal Garcia; Jamie Hartman | Walls | 2020 | |
| "Fireproof" # | One Direction | Louis Tomlinson; Julian Bunetta; Jamie Scott; Liam Payne; John Ryan | Four | 2014 | |
| "Fool's Gold" # | One Direction | Louis Tomlinson; Niall Horan; Zayn Malik; Maureen McDonald; Liam Payne; Jamie Scott; Harry Styles | Four | 2014 | |
| "Habit" | Louis Tomlinson | Louis Tomlinson; Anthony Hector; Iain James; Steve Robson | Walls | 2020 | |
| "Halfway Home" | —N/a | Louis Tomlinson; Richard Allan Cooper; Justin Parker | —N/a | Unreleased | |
| "Headline" | Louis Tomlinson | Louis Tomlinson; Craig Fitzgerald; Stephen Murtagh; Richard Parkhouse; George Tizzard | Faith in the Future | 2022 | |
| "High in California" | Louis Tomlinson | Louis Tomlinson; Fred Ball; James Vincent McMorrow; Jay Mooncie | Faith in the Future (Digital Deluxe Bonus Edition) | 2022 | |
| "History" † | One Direction | Louis Tomlinson; Julian Bunetta; Ed Drewett; Wayne Hector; Liam Payne; John Ryan | Made in the A.M. | 2015 | |
| "Holding On to Heartache" | Louis Tomlinson | Louis Tomlinson; Fred Ball; James Vincent McMorrow; Jay Mooncie | Faith in the Future | 2022 | |
| "Home" | One Direction | Louis Tomlinson; Liam Payne; Jamie Scott | Made in the A.M. (Japanese edition) | 2015 | |
| "I Broke It All" | —N/a | Louis Tomlinson; James Earp; Benjamin Francis Leftwich | —N/a | Unreleased | |
| "Imposter" † | Louis Tomlinson | Louis Tomlinson; Dave Gibson; Nicolas Rebscher | How Did I Get Here? | 2026 | |
| "In N Out" | —N/a | Louis Tomlinson; Ed Drewett; Edvard Erfjord; Henrik Barman Michelsen | —N/a | Unreleased | |
| "Irresistible" | One Direction | Louis Tomlinson; Tom Fletcher; Niall Horan; Danny Jones; Zayn Malik; Liam Payne; Dougie Poynter; Harry Styles | Take Me Home (Target Deluxe Edition) | 2012 | |
| "Jump The Gun" | Louis Tomlinson | Louis Tomlinson; Dave Gibson; Nicolas Rebescher | How Did I Get Here? | 2026 | |
| "Just Hold On" † | Louis Tomlinson; Steve Aoki | Louis Tomlinson; Steve Aoki; Nolan Lambroza; Eric Rosse; Alexandra Yatchenko | Walls; Japanese bonus edition | 2016 | |
| "Just Like You" # | Louis Tomlinson | Louis Tomlinson; Matthew Burns; Jesse Thomas | Non-album single | 2017 | |
| "Keep Rolling" | —N/a | Louis Tomlinson; Tom Barnes; Peter Kelleher; Benjamin Kohn; Camille Angelina Purcell | —N/a | Unreleased | |
| "Kill My Mind" † | Louis Tomlinson | Louis Tomlinson; Sean Douglas; Jamie Hartman | Walls | 2019 | |
| "Last First Kiss" | One Direction | Louis Tomlinson; Carl Falk; Kristoffer Fogelmark; Savan Kotecha; Zayn Malik; Albin Nedler; Liam Payne; Rami Yacoub | Take Me Home | 2012 | |
| "Last Night" | Louis Tomlinson | Louis Tomlinson; Rob Harvey; Nicolas Rebscher | How Did I Get Here? | 2026 | |
| "Lazy" | Louis Tomlinson | Louis Tomlinson; Theo Hutchcraft; Jamie Scott; Mathias Wang | How Did I Get Here? | 2026 | |
| "Lemonade" † | Louis Tomlinson | Louis Tomlinson; Theo Hutchcraft; Nico Rebscher; David Sneddon | How Did I Get Here? | 2025 | |
| "Little Black Dress" | One Direction | Louis Tomlinson; Julian Bunetta; Teddy Geiger; Liam Payne; John Ryan | Midnight Memories | 2013 | |
| "Little White Lies" | One Direction | Louis Tomlinson; Julian Bunetta; Ed Drewett; Wayne Hector; Liam Payne; John Ryan | Midnight Memories | 2013 | |
| "Long Way Down" | One Direction | Louis Tomlinson; Julian Bunetta; Liam Payne; Jamie Scott; John Ryan | Made in the A.M. | 2015 | |
| "Love and Devotion" | —N/a | Louis Tomlinson; Tom Barnes; Peter Kelleher; Benjamin Kohn; Camille Angelina Purcell | —N/a | Unreleased | |
| "Love Shot" † | Exo | Louis Tomlinson; Sarah Blanchard; Richard Boardman; Pablo Bowman; Nicholas Gale; Kim Jong-dae; Lu Yi Qiu; Park Chan-yeol; Anthony Russo; Paul Thompson; Jo Yoon-kyung | Don't Mess Up My Tempo | 2018 | |
| "Love You Goodbye" # | One Direction | Louis Tomlinson; Julian Bunetta; Jacob Kasher Hindlin | Made in the A.M. | 2015 | |
| "Lucid" | Louis Tomlinson | Louis Tomlinson; Joseph Cross; Theo Hutchcraft; David Sneddon | How Did I Get Here? | 2026 | |
| "Lucky Again" | Louis Tomlinson | Louis Tomlinson; Fred Ball; James Vincent McMorrow; Jay Mooncie | Faith in the Future | 2022 | |
| "Midnight Memories" † | One Direction | Louis Tomlinson; Julian Bunetta; Jamie Scott; Liam Payne; John Ryan | Midnight Memories | 2014 | |
| "Miss You" † | Louis Tomlinson | Louis Tomlinson; Richard Boardman; Pablo Bowman; Julian Bunetta; Ian Franzino; Andrew Haas; Laura Whiteacre | Walls; Japanese bonus edition | 2017 | |
| "Muse" | One Direction | Louis Tomlinson; Julian Bunetta; Jamie Scott; Liam Payne; John Ryan | —N/a | Unreleased | |
| "Night Changes" † | One Direction | Louis Tomlinson; Julian Bunetta; Niall Horan; Zayn Malik; John Ryan; Jamie Scott; Liam Payne; Harry Styles | Four | 2014 | |
| "No Control" | One Direction | Louis Tomlinson; Julian Bunetta; Ruth-Anne Cunningham; Liam Payne; Jamie Scott; John Ryan | Four | 2014 | |
| "On Fire" | Louis Tomlinson | Louis Tomlinson; Joseph Cross; Theo Hutchcraft; David Sneddon | How Did I Get Here? | 2026 | |
| "Only the Brave" | Louis Tomlinson | Louis Tomlinson; Duck Blackwell; Andrew Jackson | Walls | 2020 | |
| "Out of My System" † | Louis Tomlinson | Louis Tomlinson; Dave Gibson; Nicolas Rebscher | Faith in the Future | 2022 | |
| "Palaces" † | Louis Tomlinson | Louis Tomlinson; Theo Hutchcraft; Nicolas Rebscher | How Did I Get Here? | 2025 | |
| "Paradise" | Louis Tomlinson | Louis Tomlinson; Dave Gibson | Faith in the Future (Target exclusive CD) | 2022 | |
| "Perfect" † | One Direction | Louis Tomlinson; Julian Bunetta; Jacob Kasher; Maureen McDonald; John Ryan; Jesse Shatkin; Harry Styles | Made in the A.M. | 2015 | |
| "Perfect Now" | Louis Tomlinson | Louis Tomlinson; Wayne Hector; Johan Carlsson; James Scott | Walls | 2020 | |
| "Pick Your Poison" | One Direction | Louis Tomlinson; Julian Bunetta; Teddy Geiger; Niall Horan; Liam Payne; Jamie Scott; John Ryan | —N/a | Unreleased | |
| "POS" † | Sueco | Louis Tomlinson; David Arkwright; Sarah Blanchard; Richard Boardman; Pablo Bowman; Colin Cunningham; Salem Davern; Nicholas Gale; Justin Gammela; Daniel Virgil Maisonneuve; Elie Rizk; William Schutz; Mike Shinoda; Denarie Bautista Taylor; Jake Torrey | Non-album single | 2023 | |
| "Pretender" | —N/a | Louis Tomlinson; Theo Hutchcraft; David Sneddon | —N/a | Unreleased | |
| "Ready to Run" | One Direction | Louis Tomlinson; Julian Bunetta; Jamie Scott; Liam Payne; John Ryan | Four | 2014 | |
| "Right Now" | One Direction | Louis Tomlinson; Liam Payne; Ryan Tedder; Harry Styles | Midnight Memories | 2013 | |
| "Sanity" | Louis Tomlinson | Louis Tomlinson; Theo Hutchcraft; Mathias Wang | How Did I Get Here? | 2026 | |
| "Same Mistakes" | One Direction | Louis Tomlinson; Wayne Hector; Niall Horan; Zayn Malik; Liam Payne; Steve Robson; Harry Styles | Up All Night | 2011 | |
| "Saturdays" | Louis Tomlinson | Louis Tomlinson; Joseph Cross; Theo Hutchcraft; David Sneddon | Faith in the Future | 2022 | |
| "Saved by a Stranger" | Louis Tomlinson | Louis Tomlinson; Dave Gibson | "Bigger Than Me" (CD single) (Note: Released as track 2 on the "Bigger Than Me" CD single) | 2022 | |
| "Secret Heart" | —N/a | Louis Tomlinson; Fredrik Häggstam; Jamie Hartman; Sara Hjellström | —N/a | Unreleased | |
| "She Is Beauty We Are World Class" | Louis Tomlinson | Louis Tomlinson; Joseph Cross; Theo Hutchcraft; David Sneddon | Faith in the Future | 2022 | |
| "Silver Tongues" † | Louis Tomlinson | Louis Tomlinson; Joseph Cross; Theo Hutchcraft; David Sneddon | Faith in the Future | 2022 | |
| "Some Guitar" | —N/a | Louis Tomlinson; Tom Barnes; Peter Kelleher; Benjamin Kohn; Camille Angelina Purcell | —N/a | Unreleased | |
| "Something That Scares Me About Love" | —N/a | Louis Tomlinson; Jon Maguire; Liam Payne; Jack Walton; Joshua Wilkinson | —N/a | Unreleased | |
| "Spaces" | One Direction | Louis Tomlinson; Julian Bunetta; Jamie Scott; Liam Payne; John Ryan | Four | 2014 | |
| "Steal My Girl" † | One Direction | Louis Tomlinson; Julian Bunetta; Ed Drewett; Wayne Hector; Liam Payne; Jamie Scott; John Ryan | Four | 2014 | |
| "Still the One" | One Direction | Louis Tomlinson; Carl Falk; Savan Kotecha; Liam Payne; Harry Styles; Rami Yacoub | Take Me Home (Yearbook Edition) | 2012 | |
| "Story of My Life" † | One Direction | Louis Tomlinson; Julian Bunetta; Niall Horan; Zayn Malik; Liam Payne; John Ryan; Jamie Scott; Harry Styles | Midnight Memories | 2013 | |
| "Strong" # | One Direction | Louis Tomlinson; Julian Bunetta; Jamie Scott; John Ryan | Midnight Memories | 2013 | |
| "Sunflowers" # | Louis Tomlinson | Louis Tomlinson; Theo Hutchcraft; Jamie Scott; Mathias Wang | How Did I Get Here? | 2026 | |
| "Summer Love" | One Direction | Louis Tomlinson; Wayne Hector; Niall Horan; Zayn Malik; Liam Payne; Lindy Robbins; Steve Robson; Harry Styles | Take Me Home | 2012 | |
| "Take It Back" | —N/a | Louis Tomlinson; Ed Drewett; Wayne Hector; Jordan Riley; Steve Robson | —N/a | Unreleased | |
| "Taken" | One Direction | Louis Tomlinson; Toby Gad; Niall Horan; Zayn Malik; Liam Payne; Lindy Robbins; Harry Styles | Up All Night | 2011 | |
| "That's the Way Love Goes" | Louis Tomlinson | Louis Tomlinson; Robert Harvey; Richard Parkhouse; George Tizzard | Faith in the Future | 2022 | |
| "The Greatest" | Louis Tomlinson | Louis Tomlinson; Fred Ball; James Vincent McMorrow; Jay Mooncie | Faith in the Future | 2022 | |
| "Through the Dark" | One Direction | Louis Tomlinson; Jamie Scott; Liam Payne; Toby Smith | Midnight Memories | 2013 | |
| "Too Young" | Louis Tomlinson | Louis Tomlinson; Justin Franks; Jim Lavigne; Danny Majic; John Mitchell | Walls | 2020 | |
| "Two of Us" † | Louis Tomlinson | Louis Tomlinson; Duck Blackwell; Bryn Christopher; Andrew Jackson | Walls | 2019 | |
| "Walls" † | Louis Tomlinson | Louis Tomlinson; Noel Gallagher; Dave Gibson; Jamie Hartman; Jacob Manson | Walls | 2020 | |
| "We Made It" † | Louis Tomlinson | Louis Tomlinson; Julian Bunetta; Levi Lennox Malundama; Amish Patel; John Ryan | Walls | 2019 | |
| "What a Feeling" # | One Direction | Louis Tomlinson; Dan Bryer; Mike Needle; Liam Payne; Jamie Scott | Made in the A.M. | 2015 | |
| "Why So Cold" | —N/a | Louis Tomlinson; Tom Barnes; Peter Kelleher; Benjamin Kohn; Camille Angelina Purcell | —N/a | Unreleased | |
| "Written All Over Your Face" | Louis Tomlinson | Louis Tomlinson; Robert Harvey; Richard Parkhouse; George Tizzard | Faith in the Future | 2022 | |

== See also ==
- Louis Tomlinson discography
