= Louis Tomlinson discography =

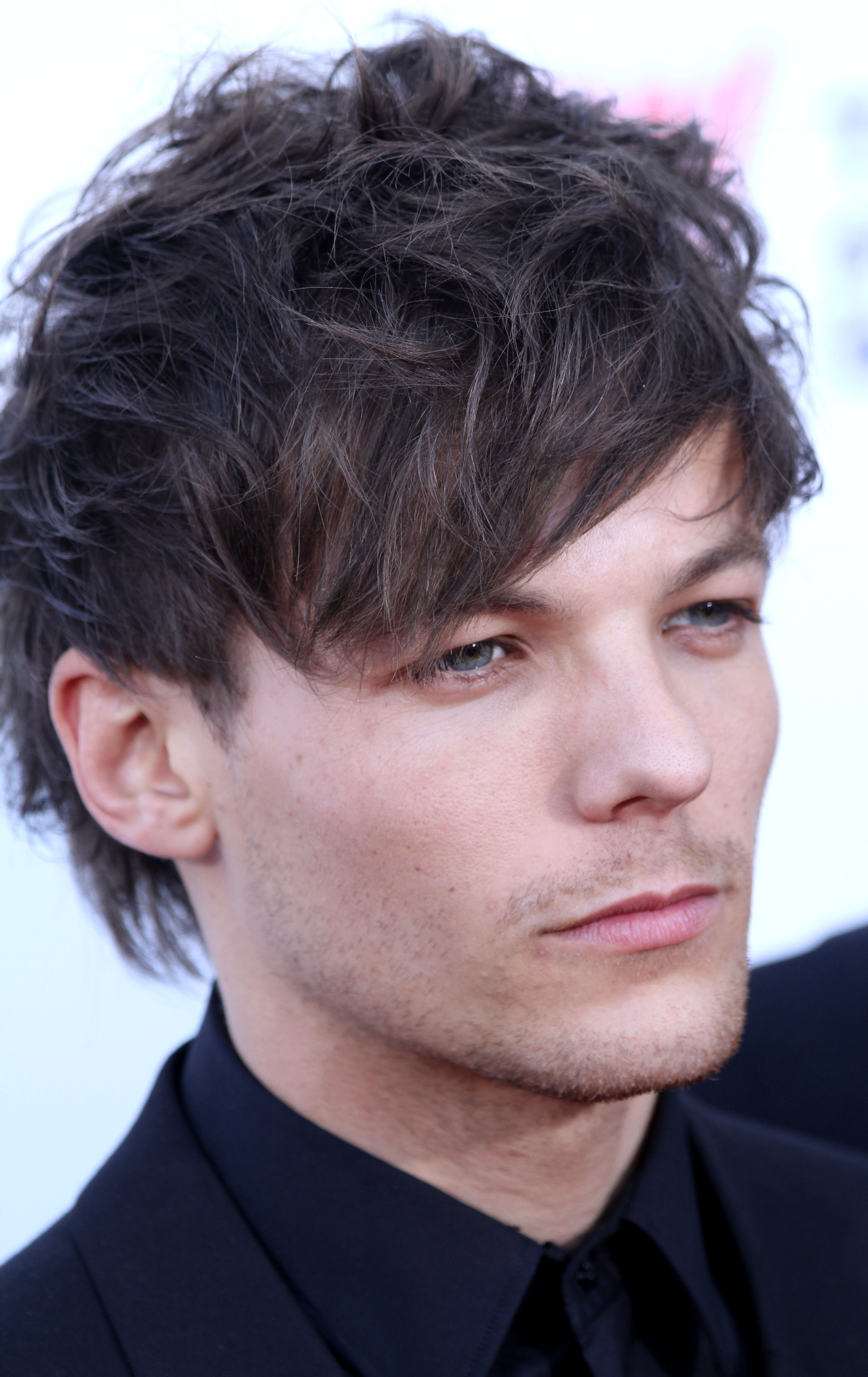
- Louis Tomlinson in 2014
- Studio albums: 3
- Live albums: 1
- Singles: 13
- Music videos: 11
- Promotional singles: 1

As a solo artist, English singer-songwriter Louis Tomlinson has released three studio albums, one live album, twelve singles, two promotional single, and eleven music videos.

Tomlinson's music career began in 2010 as a member of the boy band One Direction, which went on an indefinite hiatus in 2016. The band released five studio albums, all of which Tomlinson has writing credits and vocals on.

In December 2016, Tomlinson released his debut single "Just Hold On" with Steve Aoki, which peaked at number two on the UK Singles Chart and number 52 on the Billboard Hot 100. The song was also nominated for the Choice Electronic/Dance Song and Choice Music Collaboration at the 2017 Teen Choice Awards, winning the latter. The following year, Tomlinson released "Back to You" with American singer Bebe Rexha, which peaked at number 8 on the UK Singles chart.

In 2019, Tomlinson had signed with Arista Records. Tomlinson released the singles "Two of Us" a song devoted to his mother in March 2019, "Kill My Mind" in September 2019, "We Made It" in October 2019, "Don't Let It Break Your Heart" in November 2019 and "Walls" in January 2020.

His debut studio album Walls was released on 31 January 2020. The album debuted at number 4 on the UK Albums Chart and number 9 on the Billboard 200 chart, making it the first new album for Arista Records in almost nine years to hit the top 10 on the chart. In 2020, he debuted a new song, "Copy of a Copy of a Copy" at his live streamed concert and in 2021, he debuted another song, "Change", at his festival titled "Away From Home Festival".

He released his second studio album, Faith in the Future, on 11 November 2022. The album peaked at number one on the UK Albums Chart. It also peaked at number five on the Billboard 200. The album featured three singles: "Bigger Than Me", "Out of My System" and "Silver Tongues".

== Albums ==
=== Studio albums ===
Title	Details	Peak chart positions										Sales	Certifications
Title	Details	UK	AUS	CAN	IRE	ITA	NLD	NZ	SCO	SWE	US	Sales	Certifications
Walls	Released: 31 January 2020; Labels: Syco, Arista; Formats: CD, DL, LP, streaming, cassette	4	6	9	15	12	22	27	1	38	9	UK: 49,027; US: 39,000	BPI: Gold; FIMI: Gold
Faith in the Future	Released: 11 November 2022; Label: BMG; Formats: CD, DL, LP, streaming, cassette	1	2	5	4	3	2	3	2	3	5	US: 37,500	BPI: Silver; FIMI: Gold
How Did I Get Here?	Released: 23 January 2026; Label: BMG; Formats: CD, DL, LP, streaming, cassette	1	3	—	15	2	1	16	2	8	16		
"—" denotes an album that did not chart in that territory.

=== Live albums ===
Title	Details	Peak chart positions			
Title	Details	UK	AUS	ITA	NLD
Live	Released: 25 April 2024; Labels: BMG; Formats: CD, LP, digital download, streaming	33	45	22	8

== Singles ==
=== As lead artist ===
Title	Year	Peak chart positions										Certifications	Album
Title	Year	UK	AUS	BEL	CAN	IRE	ITA	NZ	SCO	SWE	US	Certifications	Album
"Just Hold On" (with Steve Aoki)	2016	2	20	26	40	7	25	34	1	15	52	BPI: Platinum; ARIA: Platinum; FIMI: Platinum; GLF: Platinum; MC: Platinum; RIAA: Gold	Neon Future III and Walls (Japanese Edition)
"Back to You" (featuring Bebe Rexha and Digital Farm Animals)	2017	8	11	30	33	11	52	12	6	38	40	BPI: Platinum; ARIA: 3× Platinum; FIMI: Gold; GLF: Gold; MC: Platinum; RIAA: Platinum; RMNZ: Gold	Non-album single
"Miss You"	2017	39	66	— (Note: "Miss You" did not enter the Ultratop 50, but peaked at number five on the Ultratip chart.)	— (Note: "Miss You" did not enter the Canadian Hot 100, but peaked at number 18 on the Hot Canadian Digital Songs Sales chart.)	—	92	— (Note: "Miss You" did not enter the NZ Top 40 Singles Chart, but peaked at number four on the NZ Heatseeker Singles Chart.)	22	— (Note: "Miss You" did not enter the Sverigetopplistan singles chart, but peaked at number 13 on the Sverigetopplistan Heatseeker chart.)	— (Note: "Miss You" did not enter the Billboard Hot 100, but peaked at number six on the Bubbling Under Hot 100 Singles chart, which acts as an extension to the Hot 100.)		Walls (Note: "Miss You" appears as an album track only on the Japanese edition of Walls.)
"Two of Us"	2019	64	— (Note: "Two of Us" did not enter the ARIA Singles Chart, but peaked at number 13 on the ARIA Digital Track Chart.)	— (Note: "Two of Us" did not enter the Ultratop 50, but peaked at number 26 on the Ultratip chart.)	—	79	—	— (Note: "Two of Us" did not enter the NZ Top 40 Singles Chart, but peaked at number 14 on the NZ Hot Singles Chart.)	17	— (Note: "Two of Us" did not enter the Swedish Singellista Chart, but peaked at number 16 on the Swedish Heatseeker Chart.)	— (Note: "Two of Us" did not enter the Billboard Hot 100, but peaked at number 43 on the Billboard Digital Song Sales.)		Walls
"Kill My Mind"	2019	— (Note: "Kill My Mind" did not enter the UK Singles Chart, but peaked at number 93 on the UK Singles Downloads Chart.)	—	—	—	—	—	—	99	— (Note: "Kill My Mind" did not enter the Swedish Singellista Chart, but peaked at number 10 on the Swedish Digital Song Sales Chart.)	—		Walls
"We Made It"	2019	—	—	—	—	—	—	—	—	—	— (Note: "We Made It" did not enter the Billboard Hot 100, but peaked at number 32 on the US Top 40 chart.)		Walls
"Don't Let It Break Your Heart"	2019	— (Note: "Don't Let It Break Your Heart" did not enter the UK Singles Chart, but peaked at number 49 on the UK Singles Downloads Chart.)	—	—	—	—	—	—	58	— (Note: "Don't Let It Break Your Heart" did not enter the Swedish Singellista Chart, but peaked at number 6 on the Swedish Digital Song Sales Chart.)	—		Walls
"Walls"	2020	— (Note: "Walls" did not enter the UK Singles Chart, but peaked at number 77 on the UK Singles Downloads Chart.)	—	—	—	—	—	— (Note: "Walls" did not enter the NZ Top 40 Singles Chart, but peaked at number 33 on the NZ Hot Singles Chart.)	97	—	—		Walls
"Bigger Than Me"	2022	— (Note: "Bigger Than Me" did not enter the UK Singles Chart, but peaked at number 39 on the UK Singles Downloads Chart.)	—	43	—	—	—	— (Note: "Bigger Than Me" did not enter the NZ Top 40 Singles Chart, but peaked at number 27 on the NZ Hot Singles Chart.)	—	—	—		Faith in the Future
"Out of My System"	2022	— (Note: "Out of My System" did not enter the UK Singles Chart, but peaked at number 71 on the UK Singles Downloads Chart.)	—	—	—	—	—	— (Note: "Out of My System" did not enter the NZ Top 40 Singles Chart, but peaked at number 37 on the NZ Hot Singles Chart.)	—	—	—		Faith in the Future
"Silver Tongues"	2022	—	—	—	—	—	—	— (Note: "Silver Tongues" did not enter the NZ Top 40 Singles Chart, but peaked at number 40 on the NZ Hot Singles Chart.)	—	—	—		Faith in the Future
"Lemonade"	2025	89	—	—	—	—	—	—	—	—	—		How Did I Get Here?
"Palaces"	2025	— (Note: "Palaces" did not enter the UK Singles Chart, but peaked at number 11 on the UK Singles Sales Chart.)	—	—	—	—	—	—	—	—	—		How Did I Get Here?
"Imposter"	2026	— (Note: "Imposter" did not enter the UK Singles Chart, but peaked at number 7 on the UK Singles Sales Chart.)	—	—	—	—	—	— (Note: "Imposter" did not enter the NZ Top 40 Singles Chart, but peaked at number 20 on the NZ Hot Singles Chart.)	—	—	—		How Did I Get Here?
"—" denotes a single that did not chart or was not released.

=== Promotional singles ===
List of promotional singles, showing year released and album name
Title	Year	Peak chart positions									Album
Title	Year	UK	AUS	CAN Dig.	HUN	NZ Heat	NZ Hot	PH	SCO	SWE Dig.	Album
"Just Like You"	2017	99	94	36	17	9	—	64	56	7	Non-album promotional single
"Sunflowers"	2026	—	—	—	—	—	29	—	—	—	How Did I Get Here?
"—" denotes a song that did not chart in that territory.

== Other charted songs ==
List of other charted songs, showing year released and album name
Title	Year	Peak chart positions				Album
Title	Year	UK Sales	BEL (FL) Tip	BEL (WA) Tip	NZ Hot	Album
"Habit"	2020	—	—	38	—	Walls
"Defenceless"	2020	65	34	—	—	Walls
"Written All Over Your Face"	2022	—	—	—	29	Faith in the Future
"On Fire"	2026	—	—	—	32	How Did I Get Here?
"Dark to Light"	2026	—	—	—	21	How Did I Get Here?
"—" denotes a song that did not chart in that territory.

== Videography ==
=== Music videos ===
Title	Year	Director(s)
"Just Hold On"	2017	Bradley & Pablo
"Back to You"	2017	Craig Moore
"Miss You"	2017	James Lees
"Two of Us"	2019	Huse Monfaradi
"Kill My Mind"	2019	Charlie Lightening
"We Made It"	2019	Charlie Lightening
"Don't Let It Break Your Heart"	2019	Charlie Lightening
"Walls"	2020	Charlie Lightening
"Bigger Than Me"	2022	Edward Cooke
"Out of My System"	2022	Charlie Sarsfield
"Silver Tongues"	2022	Charlie Sarsfield
"Lemonade"	2025	Emmanuel Adjei
"Imposter"	2026	Samona Olanipekun

== See also ==
- List of songs written by Louis Tomlinson
