= Louis Tomlinson World Tour =

2020–22 concert tour by Louis Tomlinson

- Tour by Louis Tomlinson
- Promotional poster for tour
- Location: Asia; Europe; North America; Oceania; South America
- Associated album: Walls
- Start date: 9 March 2020
- End date: 3 September 2022
- Legs: 7
- No. of shows: 81
- Supporting acts: Paz Carrara; Marineros; Mean Grey Cat; Nano Montyear; The Snuts; Sun Room; Only the Poets; The Outcharms; Ivan Zavala

Louis Tomlinson concert chronology
- Louis Tomlinson World Tour (2020–2022); Faith in the Future World Tour (2023–2024)

The Louis Tomlinson World Tour was the first concert tour by the English singer and songwriter Louis Tomlinson in support of his debut studio album Walls (2020). The tour began on 9 March 2020 in Barcelona but was postponed after two shows due to the COVID-19 pandemic until it restarted on 1 February 2022 in Dallas and concluded on 3 September 2022 in Milan.

== Background and development ==
On 23 October 2019, Tomlinson announced via Twitter and his official website that he would be embarking on his first ever solo tour in support of his debut album, Walls (2020). Additional dates in New York City and Los Angeles were added on 31 October along with an additional date in London added on 1 November. Dates in Santiago and Mexico City were added on 25 November. Dates in Oakland and Moscow were added on 6 December. Additional date in Milan and dates in Palmanova and Rome were added on 29 January 2020. A date in Kyiv was added on 6 February 2020. A date in Scarborough was added on 10 February 2020. A date in Madrid was added on 4 March 2020. An additional date in Mexico City and dates in Guadalajara and Monterrey were added on 11 March 2020.

On 27 February, Tomlinson announced Only The Poets, whom also opened Tomlinson's performance for BRITs week, as the supporting act for a majority of his first European leg. In March 2020, the 11 March show in Milan was cancelled, with the remaining March shows rescheduled to August and September of the same year, due to increased health concerns over the COVID-19 pandemic. In April 2020, the remaining dates for the first European leg were postponed, following continued concerns of the pandemic. In May, he postponed the North American dates of the tour. In July, Tomlinson announced that the tour would be postponed to 2021, amid the COVID-19 pandemic.

An additional date in New York was added on 31 July 2020. On 19 October of the same year, an additional date in Melbourne was added to the tour itinerary.

On 15 December 2020, UK and European dates have been rescheduled to August and September 2022, and new dates in Reykjavik, Oslo, Warsaw, Prague, Vienna and Zurich along with an additional date in Paris were added.

== Set list ==
The set list is representative of the show on 1 February 2022 in Dallas, Texas.

1. "We Made It"
2. "Drag Me Down"
3. "Don't Let It Break Your Heart"
4. "Two of Us"
5. "Always You"
6. "Too Young"
7. "7"
8. "Fearless"
9. "Habit"
10. "Copy of a Copy of a Copy"
11. "Just Hold On"
12. "Defenceless"
13. "Beautiful War"
14. "Little Black Dress"
15. "Walls"

Encore

16. "Only the Brave"
17. "Through the Dark"
18. "Kill My Mind"

== Tour dates ==
List of European concerts
Date	City	Country	Venue	Supporting act
9 March 2020	Barcelona	Spain	Razzmatazz	Only the Poets
10 March 2020	Madrid	Spain	Sala La Riviera	Only the Poets

List of North American concerts
Date	City	Country	Venue	Supporting act
1 February 2022 (Note: This concert was originally scheduled to take place on 11 July 2020, then on 24 April 2021, however, was re-scheduled, due to the COVID-19 pandemic.)	Dallas	United States	South Side Ballroom	Sun Room
2 February 2022 (Note: This concert was originally scheduled to take place on 10 July 2020, then on 21 April 2021, however, was re-scheduled, due to the COVID-19 pandemic.)	Austin	United States	Moody Theater	Sun Room
3 February 2022 (Note: This concert was originally scheduled to take place on 9 July 2020, then on 23 April 2021, however, was re-scheduled, due to the COVID-19 pandemic.)	Houston	United States	Bayou Music Center	Sun Room
5 February 2022 (Note: This concert was originally scheduled to take place on 7 July 2020, then on 31 March 2021, however, was re-scheduled, due to the COVID-19 pandemic.)	St. Louis	United States	The Pageant	Sun Room
7 February 2022 (Note: This concert was originally scheduled to take place on 22 June 2020, then on 2 April 2021, however, was re-scheduled, due to the COVID-19 pandemic.)	Atlanta	United States	Coca-Cola Roxy	Sun Room
8 February 2022 (Note: This concert was originally scheduled to take place on 23 June 2020, then on 1 April 2021, however, was re-scheduled, due to the COVID-19 pandemic.)	Nashville	United States	Ryman Auditorium	Sun Room
10 February 2022 (Note: This concert was originally scheduled to take place on 19 June 2020, then on 5 April 2021, however, was re-scheduled, due to the COVID-19 pandemic.)	Washington, D.C.	United States	The Anthem	Sun Room
11 February 2022 (Note: This concert was originally scheduled to take place on 9 April 2021, however, was re-scheduled, due to the COVID-19 pandemic.)	New York City	United States	Hammerstein Ballroom	Sun Room
12 February 2022 (Note: This concert was originally scheduled to take place on 10 April 2021, however, was re-scheduled, due to the COVID-19 pandemic.)	New York City	United States	Hammerstein Ballroom	Sun Room
14 February 2022 (Note: This concert was originally scheduled to take place on 13 June 2020, then on 12 April 2021, however, was re-scheduled, due to the COVID-19 pandemic.)	Pittsburgh	United States	Stage AE	Sun Room
15 February 2022 (Note: This concert was originally scheduled to take place on 20 June 2020, then on 8 April 2021, however, was re-scheduled, due to the COVID-19 pandemic.)	Philadelphia	United States	Metropolitan Opera House	Sun Room
17 February 2022 (Note: This concert was originally scheduled to take place on 15 June 2020, then on 6 April 2021, however, was re-scheduled, due to the COVID-19 pandemic.)	Boston	United States	House of Blues	Sun Room
19 February 2022	Cincinnati	United States	Brady Music Center	Sun Room
20 February 2022 (Note: This concert was originally scheduled to take place on 2 July 2020, then on 17 April 2021, however, was re-scheduled, due to the COVID-19 pandemic.)	Detroit	United States	The Fillmore Detroit	Sun Room
21 February 2022 (Note: This concert was originally scheduled to take place on 6 July 2020, then on 16 April 2021, however, was re-scheduled, due to the COVID-19 pandemic.)	Indianapolis	United States	Murat Theatre	Sun Room
23 February 2022 (Note: This concert was originally scheduled to take place on 10 June 2020, then on 15 April 2021, however, was re-scheduled, due to the COVID-19 pandemic.)	Chicago	United States	Chicago Theatre	Sun Room
24 February 2022 (Note: This concert was originally scheduled to take place on 9 June 2020, then on 19 April 2021, however, was re-scheduled, due to the COVID-19 pandemic.)	Minneapolis	United States	The Fillmore	Sun Room
26 February 2022	Kansas City	United States	Uptown Theater	Sun Room
28 February 2022 (Note: This concert was originally scheduled to take place on 13 July 2020, then on 26 April 2021, however, was re-scheduled, due to the COVID-19 pandemic.)	Denver	United States	Fillmore Auditorium	Sun Room
1 March 2022	Orem	United States	UCCU Center	Sun Room
3 March 2022 (Note: This concert was originally scheduled to take place on 22 July 2020, then on 4 May 2021, however, was re-scheduled, due to the COVID-19 pandemic.)	Seattle	United States	Paramount Theatre	Sun Room
4 March 2022 (Note: This concert was originally scheduled to take place on 5 May 2021, however, was re-scheduled, due to the COVID-19 pandemic.)	Portland	United States	Roseland Theater	Sun Room
6 March 2022 (Note: This concert was originally scheduled to take place on 23 July 2020, then on 3 May 2021, however, was re-scheduled, due to the COVID-19 pandemic.)	Vancouver	Canada	Orpheum Theatre	Sun Room
7 March 2022	Portland	United States	Roseland Theater	Sun Room
10 March 2022 (Note: This concert was originally scheduled to take place on 18 July 2020, then on 1 May 2021, however, was re-scheduled, due to the COVID-19 pandemic.)	Oakland	United States	Fox Theatre	Sun Room
12 March 2022	Inglewood	United States	YouTube Theater	Sun Room
13 March 2022	Inglewood	United States	YouTube Theater	Sun Room

List of European concerts
Date	City	Country	Venue	Supporting act
23 March 2022 (Note: This concert was originally scheduled to take place on 18 August 2021, however, was re-scheduled, due to the COVID-19 pandemic.)	Reykjavík	Iceland	Valsheimilið	Only the Poets
25 March 2022 (Note: This concert was originally scheduled to take place on 14 March 2020, then on 12 February 2021 and 21 August 2021, however, was re-scheduled, due to the COVID-19 pandemic.)	Stockholm	Sweden	Fryshuset	Only the Poets
27 March 2022 (Note: This concert was originally scheduled to take place on 20 August 2021 on Sentrum Scene, however, was re-scheduled, due to the COVID-19 pandemic and upgraded venue due to high demand.)	Oslo	Norway	Oslo Spektrum	Only the Poets
28 March 2022	Copenhagen	Denmark	Forum Black Box	Only the Poets
30 March 2022 (Note: This concert was originally scheduled to take place on 16 March 2020, then on 10 February 2021 and 23 August 2021, however, was re-scheduled, due to the COVID-19 pandemic and upgraded venue due to high demand.)	Berlin	Germany	Mercedes-Benz-Arena	Only the Poets
31 March 2022 (Note: This concert was originally scheduled to take place on 26 August 2021, however, was re-scheduled, due to the COVID-19 pandemic.)	Prague	Czech Republic	Forum Karlín	Only the Poets
2 April 2022 (Note: This concert was originally scheduled to take place on 19 March 2020, then on 9 February 2021 and 4 September 2021, however, was re-scheduled, due to the COVID-19 pandemic.)	Amsterdam	Netherlands	AFAS Live	Only the Poets
3 April 2022	Cologne	Germany	Palladium	Only the Poets
5 April 2022 (Note: This concert was originally scheduled to take place on 18 March 2020, then on 5 February 2021 and 1 September 2021, however, was re-scheduled, due to the COVID-19 pandemic.)	Paris	France	L'Olympia	Only the Poets
6 April 2022 (Note: This concert was originally scheduled to take place on 2 September 2021, however, was re-scheduled, due to the COVID-19 pandemic.)	Paris	France	L'Olympia	Only the Poets
9 April 2022 (Note: This concert was originally scheduled to take place on 29 August 2021, however, was re-scheduled, due to the COVID-19 pandemic.)	Zurich	Switzerland	Halle 622	Only the Poets
10 April 2022 (Note: This concert was originally scheduled to take place on 5 February 2021 and then on 30 August 2021 in Fabrique, however, was re-scheduled, due to the COVID-19 pandemic and upgraded venue due to high demand.)	Milan	Italy	Mediolanum Forum	Only the Poets
11 April 2022 (Note: This concert was originally scheduled to take place on 27 August 2021, however, was re-scheduled, due to the COVID-19 pandemic.)	Vienna	Austria	Bank Austria Halle	Only the Poets
13 April 2022 (Note: This concert was originally scheduled to take place on 24 August 2021 in Progresja, however, was re-scheduled, due to the COVID-19 pandemic and upgraded venue due to high demand.)	Łódź	Poland	Atlas Arena	Only the Poets
14 April 2022	Poznań	Poland	MPT Hall 5	Only the Poets
16 April 2022	Antwerp	Belgium	Lotto Arena	Only the Poets
18 April 2022 (Note: This concert was originally scheduled to take place on 26 March 2020, however, was re-scheduled to 16 September 2020, then to 20 February 2021 and 9 September 2021, due to the COVID-19 pandemic.)	Glasgow	Scotland	O_{2} Academy	Only the Poets
19 April 2022 (Note: This concert was originally scheduled to take place on 28 March 2020, however, was re-scheduled to 18 September 2020, then to 18 February 2021 and 10 September 2021, due to the COVID-19 pandemic.)	Manchester	England	O_{2} Apollo	Only the Poets
20 April 2022	Manchester	England	O_{2} Apollo	Only the Poets
22 April 2022 (Note: The concert in London was originally scheduled to take place across two shows in the Roundhouse on 23 and 24 March 2020, however, was re-scheduled to 20 and 21 September 2020, then to 15 and 16 February 2021, and one last time to 6 and 7 September 2021, due to the COVID-19 pandemic, and later merged into a single show in a upgraded venue due to high demand.)	London	England	OVO Arena, Wembley	Only the Poets
23 April 2022 (Note: This concert was originally scheduled to take place on 27 March 2020, however, was re-scheduled, to 7 September 2020, then to 21 February 2021 and 11 September 2021, due to the COVID-19 pandemic.)	Doncaster	England	Dome Leisure Centre	Only the Poets; The Outcharms

List of Latin American concerts
Date	City	Country	Venue	Supporting act
15 May 2022	Santiago	Chile	Movistar Arena	Sun Room; Marineros
16 May 2022 (Note: This concert was originally scheduled to take place on 18 May 2020, then on 23 May 2021, however, was re-scheduled, due to the COVID-19 pandemic.)	Santiago	Chile	Movistar Arena	Sun Room; Marineros
17 May 2022 (Note: This concert was announced to accommodate audience from the earlier concerts due to reduced capacity in the venue, in accordance to measures taken by the Chilean Government, due to the COVID-19 pandemic.)	Santiago	Chile	Movistar Arena	Sun Room; Marineros
19 May 2022 (Note: This concert was originally scheduled to take place on 13 May 2020, then on 19 May 2021, however, was re-scheduled, due to the COVID-19 pandemic.)	Asunción	Paraguay	SND Arena	Sun Room; Ivan Zavala
21 May 2022 (Note: This concert was originally scheduled to take place on 15 May 2020, then on 21 May 2021, however, was re-scheduled, due to the COVID-19 pandemic.)	Buenos Aires	Argentina	Movistar Arena	Sun Room; Paz Carrara
22 May 2022	Buenos Aires	Argentina	Movistar Arena	Sun Room; Paz Carrara
24 May 2022	Montevideo	Uruguay	Antel Arena	Sun Room; Nano Montyear
27 May 2022 (Note: This concert was originally scheduled to take place on 9 May 2020, then on 15 May 2021, however, was re-scheduled, due to the COVID-19 pandemic.)	Rio de Janeiro	Brazil	Jeunesse Arena	Sun Room
28 May 2022 (Note: This concert was originally scheduled to take place on 10 May 2020, then on 16 May 2021, however, was re-scheduled, due to the COVID-19 pandemic.)	São Paulo	Brazil	Espaço Unimed	Sun Room
29 May 2022	São Paulo	Brazil	Espaço Unimed	Sun Room
1 June 2022	Lima	Peru	Arena Perú Explanada	Sun Room
3 June 2022	Bogotá	Colombia	Movistar Arena	Sun Room
5 June 2022	Alajuela	Costa Rica	Parque Viva	Sun Room; José Capmany
8 June 2022	San Juan	Puerto Rico	Coca-Cola Music Hall	Sun Room; Mean Grey Cat
11 June 2022 (Note: This concert was originally scheduled to take place on 7 November 2020, then on 29 May 2021, however, was re-scheduled, due to the COVID-19 pandemic.)	Monterrey	Mexico	Auditorio Citibanamex	Sun Room; The Snuts
12 June 2022 (Note: This concert was originally scheduled to take place on 5 November 2020, then on 30 May 2021, however, was re-scheduled, due to the COVID-19 pandemic.)	Zapopan	Mexico	Auditorio Telmex	Sun Room; The Snuts
14 June 2022 (Note: This concert was originally scheduled to take place on 21 May 2020, then on 26 May 2021, however, was re-scheduled, due to the COVID-19 pandemic.)	Mexico City	Mexico	Pepsi Center WTC	Sun Room; The Snuts
15 June 2022 (Note: The concert was originally scheduled to take place on 3 November 2020 at Palacio de los Deportes, however, was re-scheduled to 27 May 2021 and changed location, due to the COVID-19 pandemic.)	Mexico City	Mexico	Pepsi Center WTC	Sun Room; The Snuts
17 June 2022	Mexico City	Mexico	Pepsi Center WTC	Sun Room

List of Asian concerts
Date	City	Country	Venue	Supporting act
30 June 2022	Istanbul	Turkey	KüçükÇiftlik Park	—N/a
2 July 2022 (Note: The concert was originally scheduled to take place on 18 April 2020, however, was re-scheduled to 18 October 2020, due to the COVID-19 pandemic, and later postponed to 2021. It was again rescheduled to 2 July 2022.)	Dubai	United Arab Emirates	Coca-Cola Arena	Greg Pearson
14 July 2022 (Note: This concert was originally scheduled to take place on 20 April 2020, then on 12 June 2021, however, was re-scheduled, due to the COVID-19 pandemic.)	Jakarta	Indonesia	Tennis Indoor Senayan	—N/a
16 July 2022	Manila	Philippines	Araneta Coliseum (Note: This concert was originally scheduled to take place at New Frontier Theater, but was upgraded to the nearby Araneta Coliseum due to demand.)	—N/a

List of Australian concerts
Date	City	Country	Venue	Supporting act
19 July 2022	Brisbane	Australia	Fortitude Music Hall	Pacific Avenue
20 July 2022	Brisbane	Australia	Fortitude Music Hall	Pacific Avenue
22 July 2022 (Note: This concert was originally scheduled to take place on 25 April 2020 on Big Top Luna Park, then on 20 June 2021 on upgraded venue due to high demand, however, was re-scheduled, due to the COVID-19 pandemic.)	Sydney	Australia	Hordern Pavilion	Pacific Avenue
23 July 2022	Sydney	Australia	Hordern Pavilion	Pacific Avenue
25 July 2022	Melbourne	Australia	Margaret Court Arena	Pacific Avenue
26 July 2022	Melbourne	Australia	Margaret Court Arena	Pacific Avenue
29 July 2022	Perth	Australia	HBF Stadium	Pacific Avenue

List of European concerts
Date	City	Country	Venue	Supporting act
30 August 2022 (Note: This concert was part of Roma Summer Fest.)	Rome	Italy	Cavea	—N/a
1 September 2022	Taormina	Italy	Teatro Antico di Taormina	—N/a
3 September 2022 (Note: This concert was part of Milano Summer Festival.)	Milan	Italy	Ippodromo di San Siro	—N/a

== Cancelled shows ==
Date	City	Country	Venue	Reason
11 March 2020	Milan	Italy	Fabrique	COVID-19 pandemic
23 April 2020	Auckland	New Zealand	Shed 10	COVID-19 pandemic
16 June 2020	New York City	United States	Pier 17	COVID-19 pandemic
17 June 2020	New York City	United States	Pier 17	COVID-19 pandemic
14 July 2020	Salt Lake City	United States	Sandy Amphitheater	COVID-19 pandemic
21 July 2020	Portland	United States	Keller Auditorium	COVID-19 pandemic
30 July 2020	Palmanova	Italy	Piazza Grande - Estate di Stelle	COVID-19 pandemic
31 July 2020	Rome	Italy	Rock in Roma	COVID-19 pandemic
15 August 2020	Scarborough	England	Scarborough Open Air Theatre	COVID-19 pandemic
27 April 2021	Salt Lake City	United States	The Union Event Center	COVID-19 pandemic
29 April 2021 (Note: This concert was originally scheduled to take place on 16 July 2020, then, however, was re-scheduled, due to the COVID-19 pandemic.)	Los Angeles	United States	The Wiltern	COVID-19 pandemic
30 April 2021 (Note: This concert was originally scheduled to take place on 17 July 2020, however, was re-scheduled, due to the COVID-19 pandemic.)	Los Angeles	United States	The Wiltern	COVID-19 pandemic
15 June 2021 (Note: The concert was originally scheduled to take place on 1 May 2020, however, was re-scheduled, due to the COVID-19 pandemic. It was eventually canceled.)	Osaka	Japan	Zepp Namba	COVID-19 pandemic
16 June 2021 (Note: The concert was originally scheduled to take place on 30 April 2020, however, was re-scheduled, due to the COVID-19 pandemic. It was eventually canceled.)	Tokyo	Japan	Studio Coast	COVID-19 pandemic
21 June 2021 (Note: The concert was originally scheduled to take place on 27 April 2020, however, was re-scheduled, due to the COVID-19 pandemic.)	Melbourne	Australia	Palais Theatre	COVID-19 pandemic
22 June 2021	Melbourne	Australia	Palais Theatre	COVID-19 pandemic
19 February 2022	Toronto	Canada	Rebel	COVID-19 pandemic
4 July 2022 (Note: This concert was originally scheduled to take place on 14 April 2020, then on 6 June 2021, however, was re-scheduled, due to the COVID-19 pandemic.)	Kyiv	Ukraine	Stereo Plaza	2022 Russian invasion of Ukraine
6 July 2022 (Note: This concert was originally scheduled to take place on 16 April 2020, then on 8 June 2021, however, was re-scheduled, due to the COVID-19 pandemic.)	Moscow	Russia	Crocus City Hall	2022 Russian invasion of Ukraine

== Notes ==
^{a} The score data is representative of the two shows at Roseland Theater on 4, 7 March respectively.
