= Innovation forum =

Innovation forum may refer to:

- World Innovation Forum (New York), business summit held annually
- World Innovation Forum (Kuala Lumpur), summit held annually
- Wireless Innovation Forum, non-profit "mutual benefit corporation" dedicated to technologies
- Marketing Innovation Forum Europe, annual summit gathering managers
- Open Innovations (Forum and Technology Show), annual forum and exhibition dedicated to new technologies
