= Jelly Drops =

British confectionary company

- Type: Private limited
- Industry: Food processing
- Founded: 2018; 8 years ago
- Founders: Lewis Hornby
- Headquarters: London, England
- Products: Confectionery
- Website: jellydrops.com

Jelly Drops is a British confectionery company, based in London, England. It produces sugar-free gummy candy that is made of 95% water, designed to support increased hydration in people who are susceptible to becoming dehydrated. It was founded on 28 August 2018 by Lewis Hornby, who was inspired by his elderly grandmother Pat who had dementia and was hospitalized for dehydration. Jelly Drops are also vegan.

== History ==
Hornby, a 24-year-old Royal College of Art student, conceived of the idea when his grandmother almost died of dehydration. He spent a month in her nursing home and noted that while many people with dementia refused to drink, did not feel thirst or failed to recognize cups, they would still eat confections. He began prototyping sweets that would deliver water and electrolytes to such people, additionally using it as part of his Innovation Design Engineering degree.

When a video of Hornby and his grandmother sharing the treats was shared on Facebook, it received over 48 million views, with one viewer setting up a JustGiving page that raised more than £9,000 in order to help bring the product to market.

In 2019, Jelly Drops received a further £100,000 grant, along with access to a network of industry experts, from the Alzheimer's Society as part of their Accelerator Programme, designed to support products intending to improve care and lifestyle quality of those living with dementia. In return for the charity's investment, Jelly Drops pledged to donate 1% of its profits to help fund further Alzheimer's research.

Jelly Drops launched to the public in the United Kingdom in 2020, and in the United States in 2022. The confectionery is also reportedly used in healthcare settings including in NHS wards.

== Awards and accolades ==
- Pitch@Palace Award 2019
- World Innovation Forum IMAGINE IF! Award 2019
- Dubai Design Week Progress Prize finalist
- Dyson School of Design Engineering DESIRE Award for Social Impact
- Helen Hamlyn Design Awards 2018 - Snowdon Award For Disability
