= Alzheimer Society of Ireland =

Dementia service in Ireland

The Alzheimer Society of Ireland is the leading dementia specific service provider in Ireland. The registered offices are located at Blackrock, County Dublin. The Alzheimer Society of Ireland works across the country in the heart of local communities providing dementia specific services and supports and advocating for the rights and needs of all people living with dementia and their carers.

A national non-profit organisation, The Alzheimer Society of Ireland advocates for the rights of people living with dementia and their communities to quality support and services.

The Alzheimer Society of Ireland also operates the Alzheimer National Helpline, offering information and support to anyone affected by dementia.

== Activities ==
The Alzheimer Society of Ireland provides services such as the Alzheimer National Helpline, Social Clubs, Support Groups, Day Care Services, Home Care, Dementia Advisor Service and the Mobile Information Bus. The charity does not exclusively help people with Alzheimer's disease. There are many types of dementia, which is an umbrella term. Dementia types include vascular dementia, dementia with Lewy bodies, frontotemporal dementia, Korsakoff's syndrome, Creutzfeldt–Jakob disease, HIV related cognitive impairment, mild cognitive impairment, and other rarer causes of dementia.

== Funding ==
The Alzheimer Society of Ireland relies on voluntary donations from the public through fundraising and other activities. The Alzheimer Society of Ireland receives approx 58% funding from the Health Service Executive and needs to fund raise over €3.3 million every year to keep its services going. It is a registered in Ireland as a charity, number CHY7868.

== See also ==
- Alzheimer's Society (UK)
