= Sun Room =

American band

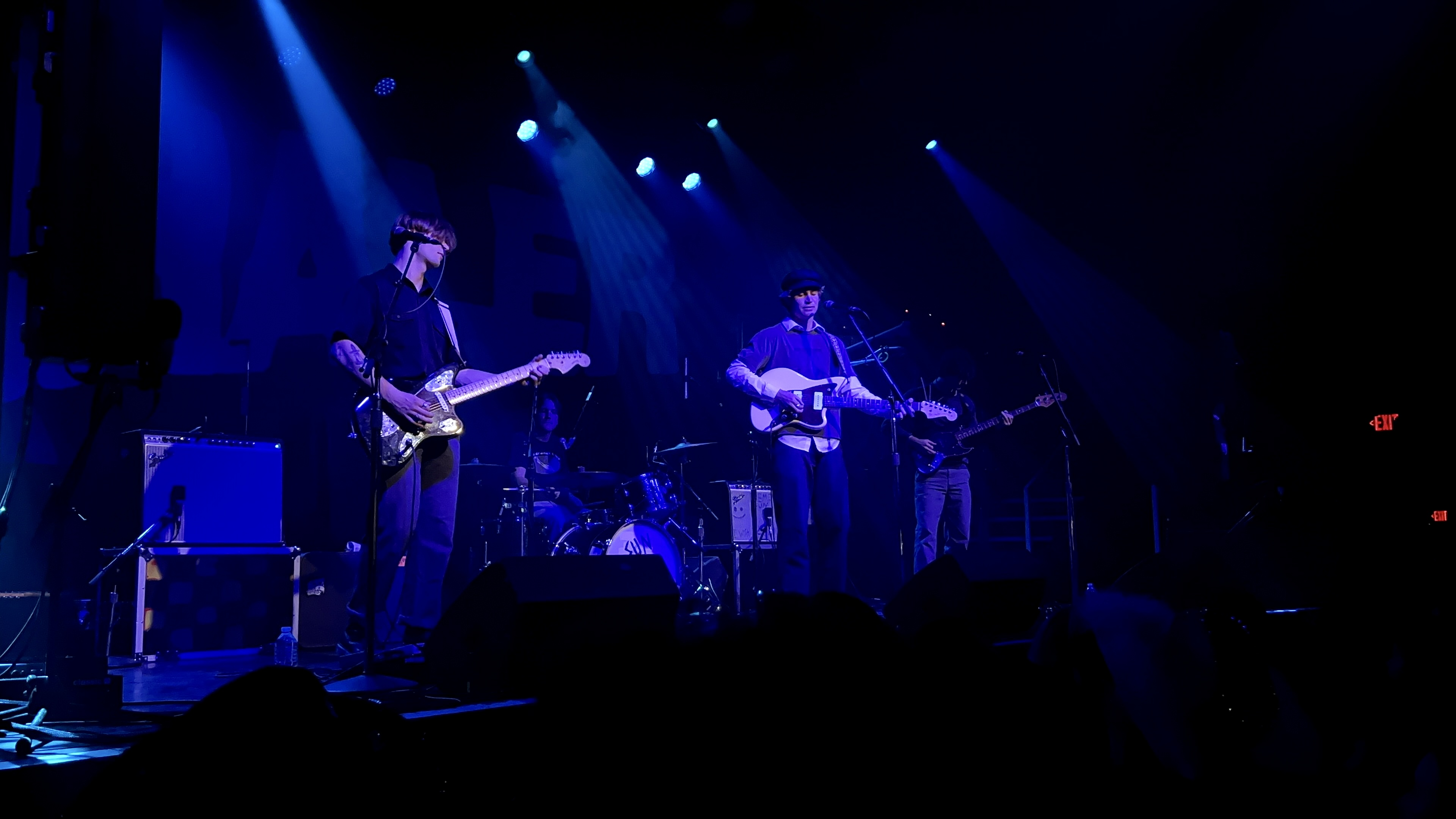
- Sun Room performing at First Avenue in 2023

Background information
- Genres: Surf music; garage rock
- Years active: 2020–present
- Members: Luke Asgian; Ashton Minnich; Max Pinamonti; Thomas Rhodes
- Past members: Gibby Anderson
- Website: www.sunroomtheband.com

Sun Room is an American surf band from southern California, currently consisting of members Luke Asgian, Ashton Minnich, Max Pinamonti, and Thomas Rhodes.

== Members ==
- Luke Asgian, vocals and guitar
- Ashton Minnich, guitar
- Max Pinamonti, bass
- Thomas Rhodes, drums (joined in 2023)

== Career ==
The concept was developed by vocalist and guitarist Luke Asgian during the 2020 quarantine. Guitarist Ashton Minnich was the first to join Asgian, followed bassist Max Pinamonti and drummer Gibby Anderson, who knew Asgian from a previous band they had all been members of.

Sun Room released their first EP Sol Del Sur with the single "Just Yesterday" in 2020. They dropped their second EP Somewhere Tropical the consecutive year with the single "Crashed My Bike". Asgian credits TikTok for Sun Room's initial exposure, after which they played at the 2021 Austin City Limits Music Festival. They supported the Irish band Inhaler on their first American tour in 2021 and in Europe in 2022.

Also in 2022, Sun Room opened for English singer-songwriter Louis Tomlinson on the North America and Latin America legs of his self-titled world tour, and joined the lineup of Tomlinson's Away From Home Festival in Spain. Following this, Sun Room embarked on their first headline tour in the U.S. In addition, the singles "Clementine" and "I Want You" were released.

Sun Room released their third EP titled Outta Their Minds in 2023, as well as the singles "Cadillac" and "Kaden's Van". The band once again reunited with Inhaler to support their Cuts and Bruises tour in the U.S. and played at Shaky Knees Music Festival. That autumn, Sun Room went on their second headline tour in North America. Anderson left the band in August and was replaced by Thomas Rhodes on tour.

== Artistry ==
All four original members brought their own musical influences to the group with Asgian bringing a central surf sound, while Pinamonti bringing 70s classic rock and 80s new wave, Minnich bringing metal, and Anderson bringing soul.

As a group, Sun Room cited contemporary bands such as Skegss, Wallows, FIDLAR, Inhaler, Surf Trash, and Daphne's Couch as their inspirations, as well as 60s bands like The Seeds, The Birds, and The Ventures. A review of the band's 2021 performance at the Mercury Lounge in New York described them as a "modern version of The Beach Boys".

== Discography ==
=== EPs ===
- Sol Del Sur (2020)
- Somewhere Tropical (2021)
- Outta Their Minds (2023)
- At Least I Tried (2023)
- Can't Explain (2024)
- Ritual of Chaos (2025)

=== Singles ===
- "Just Yesterday" (2020)
- "Crashed My Bike" (2021)
- "Clementine" (2022)
- "I Want You" (2022)
- "Cadillac" (2023)
- "Kaden's Van" (2023)
- "At Least I Tried" (2023)
- "Cut My Hair" (2023)
- "Hate It When You Call" (2024)
- "Get Me Outta New York City" (2024)
- "Jackknife" (2025)
- "Oslo, Paris, LA" (2025)
- "She'll Move To London" (2025)
- "Insincere" (2026)
- "Annie" (2026)
