= Alzheimer's Society =

United Kingdom care and research charity

- Formation: 1979
- Location: 43-44 Crutched Friars, London, EC3N 2AE
- Members: 25,000
- Board Chair: Dame Suzi Leather
- Chief executive: Michelle Dyson
- Website: alzheimers.org.uk
- Formerly called: Alzheimer's Disease Society

Alzheimer's Society is a United Kingdom care and research charity for people with dementia and their carers. It operates in England, Wales and Northern Ireland, while its sister charities Alzheimer Scotland and Alzheimer Society of Ireland cover Scotland and the Republic of Ireland respectively.

Despite its name, the charity does not exclusively help people with Alzheimer's disease. There are many types of dementia, which is an umbrella term. Dementia types include vascular dementia, dementia with Lewy bodies, frontotemporal dementia, Korsakoff's syndrome, Creutzfeldt–Jakob disease, HIV-related cognitive impairment, mild cognitive impairment, and other rarer causes of dementia.

It is an organisation that provides support for people affected by dementia via a telephone support line, as well as through dementia support workers, printed information and an online community called Dementia Support Forum.

Alzheimer's Society funds dementia research. In 2021/2022, £7m was given in 27 awards for new research, and 311 new publications came from their funding.

The society relies on voluntary donations from the public through fundraising and other activities. It is a registered Charity No. 296645, registered as a company limited by guarantee and registered in England No. 2115499. Its registered office is at 43-44 Crutched Friars, London, EC3N 2AE.

As of 2025 the Chief Executive of the Alzheimer's Society is Michelle Dyson.

== History ==
The organisation was formed in 1979, following a radio broadcast on the subject of Alzheimer's disease which brought together gerontology researcher Professor Gordon Wilcock with former carer Cora Phillips. In December of that year, Morella Fisher wrote to every British national newspaper about her experiences caring for her husband, who had early-onset dementia, with the story being covered by The Observer, prompting Phillips to get in contact. Within a few weeks, the trio had established the Alzheimer's Disease Society, with an aim to raise awareness, provide information for families and generate funds for research.

A steering committee was formed, consisting of carers and medical professionals, and the first annual general meeting was held on 13 September 1980. This first AGM was attended by 98 members and supporters. The first Newsletter was published in January 1981. A development officer was employed at around this time, and the first branches were established in Oxford and Bromley in 1980 and 1981 respectively. One of the Society's earliest contributions to research, as described in the Newsletter of January 1981, was a request for brain tissue donations to help support research studies. In 2008, Brains for Dementia Research (BDR) was established through funding by Alzheimer's Society and Alzheimer's Research UK.

Through the 1980s and 1990s the society continued to grow, with volunteer committees establishing branches across England, Wales and Northern Ireland. At the AGM in 1999 members of the society agreed the change of name to Alzheimer's Society.

By 2003 the Society had a turnover of £30 million, with over 230 branches across England, Wales and Northern Ireland. In 2009/10 the Society's income had grown to £58.7 million and it currently (2012) has a network of over 2000 services.

By of 2019, the Society had an income of £107 million, £80 million of which was from public donations.

As of financial year ending 31 March 2022, the Society had a total income of over £116 million, with nearing £89 million from donations and legacies.

Kate Lee's appointment in 2020 was brought forward by six weeks following allegations in The Guardian that the outgoing chief executive Jeremy Hughes had bullied staff. In May 2020, ThirdSector magazine reported that the regulator, the Charity commission found the society had "acted in line with their legal duties", as allegations of £750,000 NDA payments were not substantiated and staff could report inappropriate behaviour. Commenting on the result, The Guardian stated that the commission had admitted failing to investigate the original complaint properly in 2018 or interview complainants whilst the chair of the Alzheimer's trustees, Stephen Hill, said the society wanted to ensure best practice and had reviewed its procedures.

== Activities ==
The society's activities primarily focus on improving care and the lives of people living with dementia, unlike other charities such as Alzheimer's Research UK, that predominately exist to fund research projects aimed at finding cures or treatments.

=== Local activities ===
Alzheimer's Society organises and provides local activity groups and support programmes. These include activities such as Singing for the Brain, designed to promote communication and stimulation through singing, and Dementia Cafes, which offer a relaxed environment to talk about the challenges of living with dementia.

=== Information ===
The society provides information and support for people with dementia and their carers by telephone and online, including factsheets which can be downloaded.

They also provide information for health and care professionals to help them to care for people with dementia.

=== Campaigning ===
The society campaigns for the rights of people with dementia and their carers, including by lobbying for governmental policy changes.

It also runs public-facing campaigns to generate awareness of dementia and the challenges of dementia care, including the recent award-winning It's Not Called Getting Old, It's Called Getting Ill video, aimed at reframing public attitudes to receiving diagnoses and the Forgotten Third campaign in association with the England women's football team, highlighting the likelihood of developing dementia.

=== Research and technology ===
The society develops technology to support awareness and improve care, such as the 2011 Brain Map iPhone app to spread awareness of dementia.

It runs an accelerator programme, providing grants and support to people developing products and services to support those living with dementia, including launches of products such as Sibstar, a specially designed debit card, SmartSocks, intended to track agitation and alert carers of distress, and Jelly Drops, sweets that provide easy hydration.

It also is one of three founding funders of the UK Dementia Research Institute, a joint £290 million investment with the Medical Research Council and Alzheimer's Research UK.

Alzheimer's Society has been a funder of dementia research for over 30 years and provides financial backing for research that focuses on developing the care and support available for those living with dementia, improving diagnoses and discovering treatments.

They also support researchers with the Dementia Knowledge Centre, an online catalogue comprising 13,000 dementia-specific items.

== Criticisms ==
=== Animal research ===
In 2011, Animal Aid challenged four charities that are the focus of their "Victims of Charity" campaign – Cancer Research UK, the British Heart Foundation, Parkinson's UK and Alzheimer's Society – to a public debate on the scientific and moral issues relating to their funding of animal experiments. In 2020 PETA referred to Alzheimer's Society's funding of research using animal testing as gaining irrelevance for a human brain disease, commending the Society's establishment of the "Brains for Dementia Research" initiative where people can pledge to donate their brains after they die.

Alzheimer's Society has previously stated that it supports involving animals in medical research, and that it considers animal research has contributed to advances in vaccination, drugs, surgical techniques and better understanding of the biology of diseases and medical conditions including Alzheimer's disease and dementia. However, it also noted the ethical concerns involved, and stated that animals should be used in restricted circumstances, that any animals used for research should be treated humanely, and that alternative techniques should be employed where possible.

=== Local branch closures ===
The society drew criticisms of becoming too centralised and was subject to protests from members following its announcement to close all of its 240 local branches in 2010, restructuring them into 49 regional centres. An investigation led by Alan Fowler, former chair of the society's Winchester branch, claimed the society misled branch committees during the process and failed to meaningfully consult them.

== See also ==
- Alzheimer's Research UK
- Dementia UK
