= World Innovation Forum (Kuala Lumpur) =

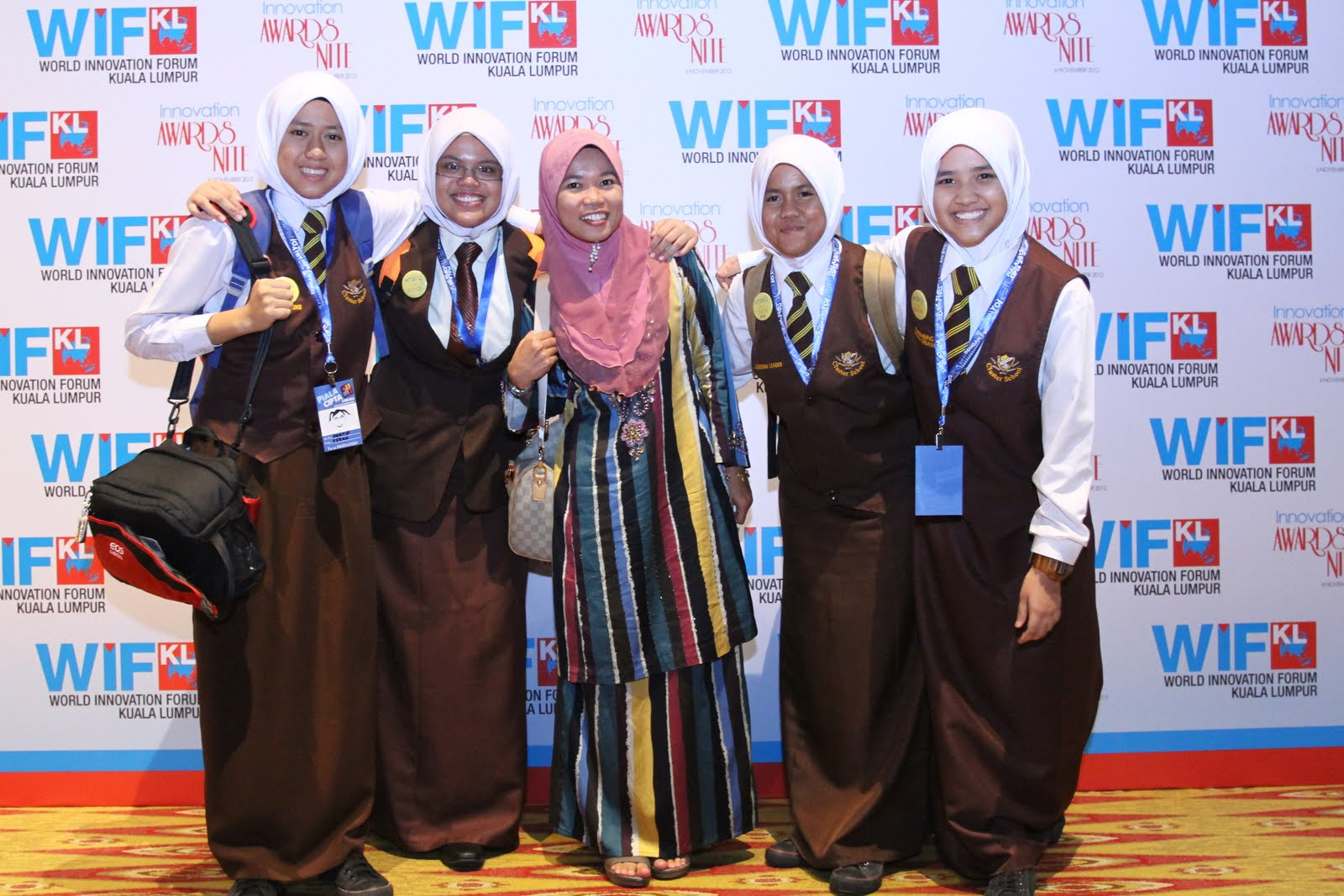
- World Innovation Forum in Kuala Lumpur
- Begins: November 12, 2013
- Ends: November 14, 2013
- Frequency: Annually
- Location: Kuala Lumpur Convention Center
- Inaugurated: 2010
- Most recent: 2012
- Participants: 15,000 attendees

World Innovation Forum (Kuala Lumpur) is an annual conference held each year in Kuala Lumpur. Past speakers at WIF-KL include current and former Malaysian Prime Ministers, Tun Dr. Mahathir bin Mohamad and Dato' Sri Haji Mohammad Najib bin Tun Haji Abdul Razak.

== Description ==
WIF-KL is a three-day annual conference and award ceremony held each year in Kuala Lumpur that discusses issues related to innovation. In 2012, WIF-KL was the culmination of the Science and Innovation Movement.

=== WIF-KL 2012 ===
WIF-KL 2012 consisted of four core events and nine satellite events:

==== WIF-KL 2012 Core Event ====
- KL Innovation Forum 2012
- BioMalaysia Conference and Exhibition 2012
- NanoMalaysia Summit and Expo
- National Innovation Conference and Exhibition (NICE) 2012

==== WIF-KL 2012 Satellite Events ====
- TEDxMerdeka
- Market Open Day (JEJAK INOVASI)
- KidsInvent Finale
- Asia Grassroot Innovation Design Competition and Forum
- 21st Century Learning (Innovation in Education)
- Re:Generation and Transform and Roll Out Session
- International Symposium on Fostering Innovation in Developing Countries
- Cyber Security Malaysia Awards, Conference and Exhibition
- WIFKL Innovation Award

=== WIF-KL 2013 ===
The 2013 World Innovation Forum will be held at Kuala Lumpur Convention Centre on November 12–14, 2013.

== Participants ==
Past participants have included business leaders such as Mohd Yusoff Sulaiman and Wing K. Lee, as well as distinguished professors such as Datuk Seri Dr. Maximus Johnity Ongkili and Anil K. Gupta.

== Organizers ==
World Innovation Forum - Kuala Lumpur (WIF-KL) WIF-KL is organized by Malaysia's Ministry of Science, Technology and Innovation (MOSTI) and the Malaysian Foundation for Innovation (YIM).
