= Jay Pryor =

- Born: Jamie Pryor
- Origin: Dublin, Ireland
- Genres: House
- Occupations: DJ; record producer
- Years active: 2015–present
- Website: facebook.com/JayPryorMusic

Jamie Pryor, better known as Jay Pryor, is an Irish producer, DJ, songwriter and remixer.

== Career ==
Jay Pryor has worked as a songwriter and producer with artists such as Michael Jackson, Louis Tomlinson, Steve Aoki, Digital Farm Animals, and more. Steve Aoki and Louis Tomlinson's single "Just Hold On", which Pryor co-produced, charted at number 2 on the official UK Singles Chart. Jay Pryor has provided official remixes for acts such as Kehlani & Ty Dolla $ign, Niall Horan, Seeb, Bastille, Snakehips, Zayn, American Authors, Anne-Marie, and DJ Fresh.

Jay Pryor's debut track "All This" has been streamed more than 70 million times online. He signed a record deal with Virgin EMI Records in 2017 and his records are released by Casablanca Records in the US. Jay is also signed to WME for agency representation, and Palm Tree Crew for management, who represent international artists like Kygo, Gryffin and Sofitukker.

== Discography ==
=== Singles ===
Title	Track details
"Say Something (Club Mix) (with Chaya)"	Released: 2 May 2021; Label: Selected.
"Aside"	Released: 14 Aug 2020; Label: Positiva / EMI
"By Now"	Released: 29 Nov 2019; Label: Positiva / Virgin EMI
"Finding Our Way" (with Steve James)	Released: 23 Aug 2019; Label: Positiva / Virgin EMI
"So What"	Released: 8 Mar 2019; Label: Positiva / Virgin EMI
"Make Luv"	Released: 9 Nov 2018; Label: Positiva / Virgin EMI
"Rich Kid$ (ft. IDA)"	Released: 6 Apr 2018; Label: Positiva / Virgin EMI
"Over You"	Released: 23 Feb 2018; Label: Jay Pryor Music
"Fall for U"	Released: 2 Oct 2017; Label: Jay Pryor Music
"Teenage Crime"	Released: 15 May 2017; Label: Jay Pryor Music
"All This"	Released: 18 November 2016; Label: Piggy Bvnk Records
"I Know"	Released: 8 February 2016; Label: AIA

=== Songs produced by Jay Pryor ===
Title	Artist	Year	Peak chart positions			Album
Title	Artist	Year	UK	FRA	US Dance	Album
"Just Hold On"	Steve Aoki and Louis Tomlinson	2016	2	8	7	Non-album single
"P.Y.T. (Pretty Young Thing)"	John Gibbons	2017	48	—	—	TBA
"Sunglasses in the Rain" (featuring Ai)	John Gibbons	2017	—	—	—	TBA
"Do It Again"	Steve Aoki and Alok	2019	—	—	—	
