= Walls (Louis Tomlinson album) =

Studio album by Louis Tomlinson
- Released: 31 January 2020
- Recorded: 2017–2019
- Genres: Britpop; indie rock
- Length: 39:33
- Labels: Arista; 78; Syco
- Producers: ADP; Duck Blackwell; Julian Bunetta; BURNS; Johan Carlsson; Mark Crew; Stuart Crichton; DJ Frank E; Yei Gonzalez; Dan Grech-Marguerat; Jamie Hartman; Andrew Jackson; Joe Janiak; Levi Lennox; Danny Majic; Dan Priddy; John Ryan; Jamie Scott; Andrew Watt

Louis Tomlinson chronology
Walls (2020)	Faith in the Future (2022)

Singles from Walls
- 1. "Two of Us" Released: 7 March 2019; 2. "Kill My Mind" Released: 5 September 2019; 3. "We Made It" Released: 24 October 2019; 4. "Don't Let It Break Your Heart" Released: 23 November 2019; 5. "Walls" Released: 17 January 2020

Walls is the first solo studio album by the English singer-songwriter Louis Tomlinson, released on 31 January 2020 through Syco Music and Arista Records. It has spawned five singles: "Two of Us", "Kill My Mind", "We Made It", "Don't Let It Break Your Heart" and "Walls". The album was met with mixed reviews, but was moderately successful commercially. It sold 35,000 copies upon its release. The album debuted at number one in Argentina, Portugal, Mexico and Scotland. It reached the top ten in Australia, Austria, Belgium, Canada, Poland, Spain, and the UK, and also debuted and peaked at number nine on the US Billboard 200 chart.

== Background ==
In making the album, Tomlinson stated he had spent "so long on this album" as he "couldn't help but crave a 'hit' single" after a career of "straight down the middle pop". While he started his solo career with the electro-influenced singles "Just Hold On" and "Back to You", after the deaths of both his mother and sister and reflecting on what he wanted, Tomlinson decided that "maybe I should start with what I love and work from there". After finally finding his sound, he managed to come up with an honest album of his thoughts and feelings and release it.

In an interview with Billboard, Tomlinson said that the album is him "just wearing [his] heart on his sleeve, and being honest, reflecting on a breakup", and that "once fans have heard the album, they will see a slightly different side" of him.

Tomlinson announced the album in a video posted to social media, saying he was "really relieved to finally be here" and thanking fans for their patience.

== Music and themes ==
The themes of the album range from relationships and family to the folly of Tomlinson's youth and days of self-doubt, go back to his 1D days, recall relationship ups and downs and relate the life lessons learnt on the way to his present life.

The album opens with an indie pop, Britpop track "Kill My Mind", a song written as a "statement of intent. 'This is where I want to be, this is the space I want to move into.'" Guitar-based "Don't Let It Break Your Heart" is "a touching anthem about moving forward in the face of hardship" with "a surging, singalong chorus about losing someone, or perhaps the break-up of a relationship". "Two of Us" is a balladic ode to Tomlinson's late mother Johannah Deakin and the impact her death had on him. "Britpop-tinged" "We Made It" with a strummed acoustic guitar intro describes Tomlinson's pre-fame days, hanging out with his on-and-off girlfriend during his time in One Direction and their teen dreams for the future, while the chorus of the song references Tomlinson's fans and his struggle to find his place in the early days of One Direction. Acoustic guitar driven ballad "Too Young" as well as Oasis-inspired title track "Walls" are written about Tomlinson's temporary breakup with his girlfriend "that ultimately made the pair's relationship stronger." Tomlinson described "Too Young" as the song "about meeting 'the one' aged 18 and, like a lot of blokes that age, not being equipped for it. I found it hard to look that far ahead. I had to make a few mistakes and go down the wrong path to realise what I had and what I thought I’d lost." Tomlinson called "Walls" "more specific" and a song "about coming home having been on tour, soon after we'd split. I found some of my girlfriend’s clothes in the cupboard and it hit me what I’d done." He said that he loves "the indie sound of the song and its circular nature – it opens and closes with the same lyric."

An indie-pop "Habit" is "a message to fans" and "a reflection on fame" steeped in "gorgeous electric guitar", "crashing drums and sweeping strings." Tomlinson said that "music is the habit that I keep coming back to" and called the song "a thank you to fans and a reminder to [himself] to be grateful for being given this position." "Always You" is the oldest song on the album, teased by Tomlinson in early 2017 with cryptic posts on Twitter and Instagram In August 2017 Tomlinson posted the first 13 seconds of the track that contained the lyrics "I went to Amsterdam without you, and all I could do was think about you" on his Instagram story. Tomlinson said it was "kind of about my story of traveling the world and just being a f*****g idiot and going, 'Of course it was always you'." On a dramatic indie pop ballad "Fearless", which opens and closes with children's voices, Tomlinson looks back at the peers he grew up with and ponders what ageing means. "Perfect Now", "written quite deliberately as an attempt to write a fan favourite song" and "lyrically an extension of 'What Makes You Beautiful', One Direction's first single", features briskly-plucked acoustic guitar and violins. On "Defenceless" Tomlinson shows his honesty and vulnerability, "feeling great, youthful and amazing one day" and "a little bit down in the dumps the next day." The album closes with an indie guitar-driven Oasis-inspired "Only the Brave". Tomlinson described the track as the one "that may have been written for Liam Gallagher", and that despite it being the shortest track on the album (1.44 minutes), it "gets its message across so clearly."

== Critical reception ==
Professional ratings
Aggregate scores
Source	Rating
AnyDecentMusic?	5.4/10
Metacritic	53/100
Review scores
Source	Rating
AllMusic	3/5 stars
Evening Standard	3/5 stars
Idolator	4/5 stars
The Independent	2/5 stars
NME	3/5 stars
Pitchfork	4.8/10
Rolling Stone	2.5/5 stars
Spectrum Culture	4/5 stars

Walls was met with mixed reviews. At Metacritic, which assigns a normalised rating out of 100 to reviews from professional critics, the album has an average score of 53 out of 100, based on six reviews, indicating "mixed or average reviews". Aggregator AnyDecentMusic? gave it 5.4 out of 10, based on their assessment of the critical consensus.

Rob Sheffield of Rolling Stone called Tomlinson's album '"excellent" and "worth the wait" and praised him for "putting a lot of heart and soul into it". He particularly singled out "Two of Us", calling it "emotionally bold" and saying that "these days people aren't necessarily used to hearing male songwriters open their hearts like that"; and "Kill My Mind" – "the sound of a pop artist hitting a new creative breakthrough." Neil Yeung of AllMusic was similarly positive, calling the album's tracks a "pleasantly surprising [and] straightforward collection of indie and Britpop-influenced singalongs from a maturing family man", "wholesome and sweet as any of 1D's hit singles" and praised Tomlinson's "genuinely heartwarming and enjoyable authenticity". He ended his review by saying that Tomlinson's album "winds up being the most mature and natural of the ex-1D bunch". Mike Nied of Idolator called the album "a strong debut", "a compelling collection that boldly defies current trends and simultaneously proves [Tomlinson] has more to say now than ever before" and "a serious win that will keep us coming back for more". Jeffrey Davies of Spectrum Culture called Walls "an introspective look at growing up and finding yourself—and your voice" and praised Tomlinson for "addressing some more mature subjects on Walls, such as anxiety, mortality, and self-integrity, which also sets the album apart from the solo work of other ex-1D members". The Aquarian Weekly called Walls "a personal, cleverly crafted approach to a bubblegum pop meets alternative rock debut album" and named it one of their 25 best albums of 2020, praising Tomlinson's "expert storytelling abilities", "technical skills" and "instrument expertise".

Ella Kemp of NME described the album as "Oasis-inspired", "largely conservative" and "primarily guitar-led", particularly praising its opening track "Kill My Mind" (which she called "the album's best track") and "Walls". She ended the review by saying that Tomlinson's "perhaps taking the time to find himself properly before launching into a boisterous future". In her review for Entertainment.ie, Lauren Murphy specifically praised "Kill My Mind", "Too Young", "Habit", "Fearless", and "Perfect Now", but ended her review by stating that Tomlinson's debut solo album "embraces his love of indie music but doesn't quite go far enough" and takes "zero risks in a musical sense" though it has "some really tender moments that undoubtedly show his flair for lyric-writing." Nicholas Hautman of Us Weekly felt the record "fully embraces the Britpop genre" and called him "arguably the strongest songwriter" when compared to other One Direction members. He specifically complimented "We Made It" and "Only the Brave" as standout tracks while looking down on "Walls", which he called "bland for a title track", and "Always You", which he felt "tries a little too hard to replicate 1D's famously euphoric choruses". Writing for the South China Morning Post, Chris Gillett felt the album was "a mixed bag" and that "he's still trying to find his own identity" but that he "shows signs of promise".

Some reviews were less positive. Alexandra Pollard of The Independent called the album "deeply unremarkable" while adding that "listening to it is like wading through a quagmire of banality". Mark Kennedy, writing for Associated Press, wrote that the album was "a total snoozer" while calling it "unoffensive and uneventful". Brenna Ehrlich of Rolling Stone felt that the album was too nostalgic of Tomlinson's days in One Direction and that it "doesn't quite assert enough musical independence" while hoping that in the future "he has the guts to let go and realize that those salad days are getting a bit wilted". Rachel McGrath of the Evening Standard echoed Ehrlich's thoughts, writing that "while Tomlinson attempts to embrace a slightly edgier sound, he often falls back on what worked for 1D" and that he "hasn't quite shaken off his boyband past". Lior Phillips of Variety felt like Tomlinson did not "try to recapture that group's past [One Direction] glories but tries recapturing Oasis's and Britpop's instead, keeping his real identity a blur" and that "it's not yet clear exactly who Tomlinson is without them". Chris DeVille of Stereogum felt that the album "stops short of a full-blown Britpop revival" and called the album "extremely mid" and "basic". He ended his review by wondering "what an interesting record he could make if he let himself do so rather than remaining in the safety of One Direction's shadow." Ashley Bardhan of Pitchfork gave a negative review, calling it "maddeningly uninteresting" and filled with "dead-eyed vocal delivery and lazy drumming, strumming, and writing", adding that she felt it was difficult to tell "whether Tomlinson is even trying to make music different from his time in One Direction", ending her review by saying "you can take the boy out of the boyband, but not the boyband out of the boy".

== Commercial performance ==
Walls debuted at number nine on the US Billboard 200 with 39,000 album-equivalent units, making it the first new album for Arista Records in almost nine years to hit the top 10 on the chart. At release, the album sold 35,000 units. In the UK, the album sold 49,027 units.

== Track listing ==
The full track list for the album was revealed on 11 January 2020 through a mural painting on 83, Hanbury Street, London.

Standard edition
No.	Title	Writer(s)	Producer(s)	Length
1.	"Kill My Mind"	Louis Tomlinson; Sean Douglas; Jamie Hartman	Hartman	3:40
2.	"Don't Let It Break Your Heart"	Tomlinson; Stuart Crichton; Cole Citrenbaum; James Newman; Stephen Wrabel	Crichton	3:24
3.	"Two of Us"	Tomlinson; Bryn Christopher; Andrew Jackson; Duck Blackwell	Dan Priddy; Mark Crew	3:37
4.	"We Made It"	Tomlinson; Levi Lennox; Julian Bunetta; John Ryan II; Amish "ADP" Patel	Lennox; Bunetta; Ryan; ADP; Dan Grech-Marguerat	3:21
5.	"Too Young"	Tomlinson; Jim Lavigne; Danny Majic; John Mitchell; Justin Franks	Frank E; Danny Majic	3:49
6.	"Walls"	Tomlinson; Hartman; Noel Gallagher; Dave Gibson; Jacob Manson	Hartman	3:50
7.	"Habit"	Tomlinson; Iain James; Wayne Hector; Steve Robson	Robson	3:04
8.	"Always You"	Tomlinson; Matthew Burns; Jason Reeves; Ali Tamposi; Andrew Watt	Watt; BURNS	3:08
9.	"Fearless"	Tomlinson; Hartman; Ed Drewett; Yei Gonzalez; Ambar	Gonzalez	3:05
10.	"Perfect Now"	Tomlinson; Hector; Jamie Scott; Johan Carlsson	Scott; Carlsson	3:07
11.	"Defenceless"	Tomlinson; Douglas; Joe Janiak	Janiak	3:44
12.	"Only the Brave"	Tomlinson; Jackson; Blackwell	Jackson; Blackwell	1:44
Total length:				39:33

Japanese edition (bonus tracks)
No.	Title	Writer(s)	Producer(s)	Length
13.	"Just Hold On" (with Steve Aoki)	Tomlinson; Steve Aoki; Eric Rosse; Sasha Sloan; Nolan Lambroza	Aoki; Sir Nolan; Jay Pryor	3:18
14.	"Miss You"	Tomlinson; Richard Boardman; Bunetta; Asia Whiteacre; Andrew Haas; Ian Franzino; Pablo Bowman	Bunetta; Afterhrs	3:02
Total length:				45:54

== Personnel ==
Credits adapted from the album's liner notes.

Vocals

- Louis Tomlinson – lead vocals (all tracks), background vocals (4)
- Wrabel – backing vocals, gang vocals (2)
- Andrew Jackson – backing vocals (3)
- Julian Bunetta – backing vocals (4)
- John Ryan II – backing vocals (4)
- John Mitchell – backing vocals (5)
- Jamie Hartman – backing vocals (6)
- Joe Janiak – backing vocals (11)

Musicians

- John Foyle – synths (2, 6, 8, 9, 11), bass guitar (8, 9), acoustic guitar (8, 9), electric guitar (8, 9), drums (2, 8, 9, 11)
- Sean Hurley – bass (1)
- Josh Tucker – bass guitar (1)
- Nicholas Semrad – keyboards (1, 6)
- Jack Duxbury – electric guitar (3)
- Duck Blackwell – piano (3)
- Julian Bunetta – guitar, bass, keys, programming (4)
- Danny Majic – bass, keyboards, strings (5)
- Justin Franks – piano, keyboards, strings (5)
- Dan Kalisher – guitar (1, 6)
- Blair Sinta – drums (6)
- Paul Sayer – guitar (7)
- Tom Longworth – bass (7)
- Karl Brazil – drums (7)
- Julius Bogren – guitar (9)
- Tony Malm – bass (9)
- Jamie Scott – guitar, tambourine (10)
- Mattias Johansson – violin (10)
- David Bukovinszky – cello (10)
- Joe Janiak – bass & acoustic guitar, electric guitar, percussion (11)
- Carey Watkins – drums (11)

Production

- Rob Bisel – engineering (1, 6)
- Stuart Crichton – engineering (2)
- Mark Crew – engineering (3)
- Julian Bunetta – engineering (4)
- John Ryan II – engineering (4)
- Jeff Gunnell – engineering (4)
- Danny Majic – engineering (5)
- Martin Hannah – engineering (10)
- Dan Grech-Marguerat – mixing (1, 2, 4, 6, 11)
- Spike Stent – mixing (3)
- John Foyle – mixing (7–9)
- Matty Green – mixing (5, 10)
- Duck Blackwell – engineering, mixing (12)
- Dale Becker – mastering (all tracks)

Imagery

- Dulcie Boote – design
- Joeseth Carter – booklet photography
- Ryan Saradjola – cover photography

== Charts ==
=== Weekly charts ===
Weekly chart performance for Walls
Chart (2020)	Peak position
Argentine Albums (CAPIF)	1
Australian Albums (ARIA)	6
Austrian Albums (Ö3 Austria)	9
Belgian Albums (Ultratop Flanders)	10
Belgian Albums (Ultratop Wallonia)	27
Canadian Albums (Billboard)	9
Czech Albums (ČNS IFPI)	34
Dutch Albums (Album Top 100)	22
Estonian Albums (Eesti Ekspress)	24
Finnish Albums (Suomen virallinen lista)	30
French Albums (SNEP)	48
German Albums (Offizielle Top 100)	21
Hungarian Albums (MAHASZ)	18
Irish Albums (Official Charts)	15
Italian Albums (FIMI)	12
Japanese Albums (Oricon)	46
Mexican Albums (AMPROFON)	1
New Zealand Albums (RMNZ)	27
Polish Albums (ZPAV)	9
Portuguese Albums (AFP)	1
Scottish Albums (Official Charts)	1
Spanish Albums (PROMUSICAE)	4
Swedish Albums (Sverigetopplistan)	38
Swiss Albums (Schweizer Hitparade)	12
UK Albums (Official Charts)	4
US Billboard 200	9

=== Year-end charts ===
Year-end chart performance for Walls
Chart (2020)	Position
Belgian Albums (Ultratop Flanders)	180
Portuguese Albums (AFP)	24
Spanish Albums (PROMUSICAE)	62
Chart (2021)	Position
Belgian Albums (Ultratop Flanders)	199
Spanish Albums (PROMUSICAE)	50
Chart (2022)	Position
Belgian Albums (Ultratop Flanders)	195
Portuguese Albums (AFP)	72
Spanish Albums (PROMUSICAE)	98

== Certifications ==
Certifications for Walls
Region	Certification	Certified units/sales
Italy (FIMI)	Gold	25,000^{‡}
Mexico (AMPROFON)	Gold	30,000^{‡}
Poland (ZPAV)	Gold	10,000^{‡}
Singapore (RIAS)	Gold	5,000^{*}
Spain (Promusicae)	Gold	20,000^{‡}
United Kingdom (BPI)	Gold	100,000^{‡}
^{*} Sales figures based on certification alone.^{‡} Sales+streaming figures based on certification alone.

== Release history ==
Release dates and formats for Walls
Region	Date	Format(s)	Label	Ref.
Various	31 January 2020	Cassette; CD; digital download; streaming; picture disc; vinyl	Arista; 78; Syco	

== See also ==
- List of 2020 albums
