= No Control (One Direction song) =

2014 song by One Direction

Song by One Direction

from the album Four
- Studio: Enemy Dojo (Calabasas, CA), Angel Face Studios (London)
- Length: 3:19
- Label: Columbia; Syco
- Songwriters: Louis Tomlinson; Ruth-Anne Cunningham; Jamie Scott; Liam Payne; Julian Bunetta; John Ryan
- Producers: Bunetta; Ian Franzino; Ryan; Afterhrs

"No Control" is a song by English-Irish boy band One Direction from their fourth studio album, Four (2014). It was written by Louis Tomlinson, Ruth-Anne Cunningham, Jamie Scott, Liam Payne, Julian Bunetta, and John Ryan. The song was not released as a formal single, however, fans pushed the song to be released as one starting an online campaign called #ProjectNoControl. It has charted in three countries.

== Background ==
"No Control" is the eighth track from their fourth studio album, Four. In 2015, fans began a campaign via social media called #ProjectNoControl. The campaign was to get the song to be released as an official single from Four. Fans would set a "release date" to request the song on radio, stream and download it via Spotify and iTunes to get the song to number one on the charts. The project was also a way to support Louis Tomlinson, following an internet feud with Naughty Boy. Additionally, fans created unofficial cover art and music videos in support of the song. The hashtag trended worldwide and even garnered a response from the band, thanking the fans for their support.

Speaking on The Late Late Show with James Corden, Tomlinson explained that fans decided to do their own release of the song because "they loved it so much" and it was never chosen as a single by the band. On a different episode of The Late Late Show with James Corden, the band released a "music video" for the song as a part of a skit of Carpool Karaoke, featuring the band along with Corden performing a synchronised choreography in denim shirts.

== Composition and lyrics ==
"No Control" was written by Louis Tomlinson, Ruth-Anne Cunningham, Jamie Scott, Liam Payne, Julian Bunetta, and John Ryan, while production was handled by Bunetta, Ryan, Ian Franzino, and Afterhrs. The song's BPM count is 143, and its key is E Major. It was recorded at Enemy Dojo in Calabasas, California, and Angel Face Studios in London, while mixing was handled at the Dark Room. One of the band's more explicit innuendo songs from the album, the song is about sex.

== Critical reception ==
Brad Nelson of The Guardian described the track "as muscular and flexible as a Cheap Trick song", and compared the song's chorus to the Killers' "Mr. Brightside". Jason Lipshutz of Billboard praised the song's production for its balance between the instrumentals and vocals. It is also regarded as a "fan favourite" from the album.

== Chart performance ==
Due to the fan campaign, "No Control" topped the Billboard Twitter Real-Time chart, garning one million US streams in the week ending 17 May, and selling 5,000 digital downloads. The song also peaked at number seven on the US Bubbling Under Hot 100. The song reached number 135 on the UK Singles Chart. It is the twentieth biggest One Direction song in the country.

== Personnel ==
Credits for "No Control" adapted from album's liner notes.

- Julian Bunetta – producer, engineering, instrumentation, backing vocals
- John Ryan – producer, instrumentation, backing vocals
- Ian Franzino – producer, engineering, instrumentation
- Afterhrs – producer
- Andrew Haas – engineering, instrumentation
- Alex Oriet – recording engineer
- Benjamin Cheng – recording engineer
- Ash Howes – mixing (The Dark Room, London)
- Randy Merrill – assistant mastering engineer
- Jamie Scott – backing vocals
- Damon Bunetta – backing vocals
- Tom Coyne – mastering (Sterling Sound, Nashville, Tennessee)

== Charts ==
Chart performance for "No Control"
Chart (2014–15)	Peak position
Mexico Ingles Airplay (Billboard)	27
UK Singles (OCC)	135
US Bubbling Under Hot 100 (Billboard)	7

== Certifications ==
Certifications for "No Control"
Region	Certification	Certified units/sales
Mexico (AMPROFON)	Gold	30,000^{‡}
New Zealand (RMNZ)	Gold	15,000^{‡}
United Kingdom (BPI)	Silver	200,000^{‡}
^{‡} Sales+streaming figures based on certification alone.
