= Two of Us (Louis Tomlinson song) =

2019 song by Louis Tomlinson

Single by Louis Tomlinson

from the album Walls
- Released: 7 March 2019
- Genre: Pop
- Length: 3:38
- Label: Syco; Arista; 78
- Songwriters: Louis Tomlinson; Bryn Christopher; Andrew Jackson; Duck Blackwell
- Producers: Dan Priddy; Mark Crew; Blackwell (co.)

Louis Tomlinson singles chronology
"Miss You" (2017)	"Two of Us" (2019)	"Kill My Mind" (2019)

Music video
- "Two of Us" on YouTube

"Two of Us" is a song by English singer-songwriter Louis Tomlinson, released as a single on 7 March 2019. It is his first release on Arista Records after signing with the label in early 2019. The song is about his late mother, Johannah Deakin who died in 2016 after battling a long fight against leukemia. It is the lead single from Tomlinson's debut studio album Walls, released on 31 January 2020.

== Background and composition ==
Tomlinson's mother, Johannah Deakin, died from leukemia in December 2016; she was 43. Tomlinson had previously spoken about the bond the two shared and said in an interview that "My mum always knew what I was feeling and what I wanted." In his interview with BBC Radio 1 Newsbeat Tomlinson talked about how he used to lean on his mum for a lot of things - "anytime I needed advice on something she would be the first call I made."

"Two of Us" is a song that honours Johannah's memory and describes the impact her death had on Tomlinson. In his interview with iNews Tomlinson said: "To be honest, I’ve wanted to write this song for a while. But it’s a bold thing to do, and when I had those thoughts, I wanted a few more years of experience as a songwriter before writing it. This is one of the most important songs to me, and I had only one chance to get it right." In his interview with BBC Radio 1 Newsbeat Tomlinson said that writing the song for him "therapeutic", "empowering" and "something [he] needed to get off [his] chest." He said: "I'm not at the stage in my grief where I'm going to open the first verse and burst into tears... I don't want people to get caught up in the sadness of it. The song should be hopeful."

== Promotion ==
In early February, Tomlinson tweeted that he had "just heard the master of the single. So excited for you all to hear it!" Later in the month, he posted a teaser video for the song, writing on a piece of paper, "It's been a minute since I called you," as a piano plays. Tomlinson officially announced the song's title and release date on 28 February.

In early March 2019, Tomlinson sent fans on a scavenger hunt to be the first to listen to his new single. He announced the contest through his personal Instagram, including a map of the world. The scavenger hunt included a world map with the faces of his former One Direction members. Attached to the pictures were tags in different countries were clips to piece together the song, all they had to do was share what they found using the hashtag #TwoOfUs. The tags would include hotspots to listen to pieces of the song, sharing what they heard using the hashtag.

The acoustic version of the song was released on 24 May 2019.

== Reception ==
Trey Alston of MTV called "Two of Us" "a stirring tune that warms the heart with its strong atmosphere of love" and "a somber, reflective ode" to Tomlinson's mother, "his star in the nighttime sky".

Writing for Rolling Stone, Rob Sheffield included "Two of Us" in his list of Top 25 Songs of 2019, praising Louis "speaking plainly about grief and loss", and describing the line about calling his late mother's voicemail — “I’ll leave a message so I’m not alone” — as "devastating in its candor"

The song was included in the 22 Best Mothers Day song by The Oprah Magazine.

== Music videos ==
Louis released three music videos for "Two of Us".

The lyric video was released along with the song, and it features a closeup of Tomlinson's hands writing the lyrics of the song on sheets of paper. Trey Alston of MTV called it "simplistic" and "stirring" and praised it for "going farther [than] typed words in Arial font fading in and out of the screen" and "adding an extra thematic level to an already emotional number"

"Richard's Bucket List Official Video" was released on 24 April 2019. in this video Louis helps a man named Richard who lost his wife to Alzheimer's disease in 2016 (the same year Louis lost his mum) to fulfil items on his bucket list: fly a helicopter, drive a race car, give Louis a tattoo, go on a rollercoaster and sing in front of a live audience. Louis said that the video feels "particularly relevant and powerful" to him and called Richard "a classing example of a fearless man who in light of tragedy still pushes himself to live with as much laughter and happiness as possible". The video urges viewers to donate to three different charities: the Bluebell Wood Children's Hospice (of which Louis is a patron), Cancer Research UK (in honour of Louis' mother) and the Alzheimer's Society (in honour of Richard's wife).

The official music video, directed by Huse Monfaradi was released on 16 May 2019. It was shot in black-and-white widescreen and features Tomlinson on the piano, playing guitar and emotionally performing the song under a spotlight, before switching to a live band performance.

For this video, Louis wanted to show a different side to himself involving musicianship and performing with a band, something that he hadn’t really done before. The song was deeply personal to Louis as it’s about his mother passing away a couple of years ago at a very young age. Nevertheless he was keen for it to not feel too sad and have more a more energetic and uplifting positive message, and I think tonally we got that just right. The location I chose was the old town hall in Crouch End which had loads of interesting, different rooms and spaces – including the semi-derelict main hall, where interestingly Queen first ever performed back in the 70s. We shot anamorphic black and white, beautifully lit by Olly Wiggins. I didn’t want to go for anything over-stylised and just let the pictures and Louis performance speak for itself, and I feel Olly really managed to translate that onto screen.

— Huse Monfaradi, the director of "Two of Us" music video

Writing for Rolling Stone, Claire Shaffer praised the music video for "capturing the weight of the song" and "firmly establishing Tomlinson’s talent and appeal as a true solo artist and frontman"

== Charts ==
Chart (2019)	Peak position
Australia Digital Tracks (ARIA)	13
Belgium (Ultratip Bubbling Under Flanders)	26
Finland Digital Songs (Suomen virallinen lista)	4
Hungary (Single Top 40)	7
Ireland (IRMA)	79
Netherlands (Dutch Top 40 Tiparade)	18
New Zealand Hot Singles (RMNZ)	14
Scotland (OCC)	17
Sweden Heatseeker (Sverigetopplistan)	16
UK Singles (OCC)	64
US Digital Song Sales (Billboard)	43
