= Sunflowers (Louis Tomlinson song) =

- CD single art

Promotional single by Louis Tomlinson

from the album How Did I Get Here?
- B-side: "Sunflowers (Live in Amsterdam, 2026)"
- Released: 5 June 2026
- Length: 3:59
- Label: BMG
- Songwriters: Louis Tomlinson; Theo Hutchcraft; Jamie Scott; Mathias Wang
- Producers: Nicolas Rebscher; Mathias Wang

"Sunflowers" is a song by English singer-songwriter Louis Tomlinson from his album How Did I Get Here? It was released as the album's first promotional single on 5 June 2026.

== Background and release ==
The song was written by Louis Tomlinson, Jamie Scott, Theo Hutchcraft and Mathias Wang, and was produced by Wang and Nicolas Rebscher. It was released as an album track on the album How Did It Get Here? on 23 January 2026. On 1 May 2026, it was announced through social media that it would be getting released as a CD single.

== Reception ==
"Sunflowers" uses sunflowers, commonly associated with loyalty and admiration, as an embodiment for "returning to the light." Paste likened the song to Lonerism by Tame Impala and Salad Days by Mac DeMarco.

== Track listing ==
No.	Title	Length
1.	"Sunflowers"	3:59
2.	"Sunflowers (Live in Amsterdam, 2026)"	4:13

== Personnel ==
Credits for "Sunflowers" adapted from Apple Music.

Musicians

- Louis Tomlinson – vocals, background vocals
- Nicolas Rebscher - keyboards, guitar, percussion
- Michael Blackwell - guitar
- Jamie Houghton - drums
- Alexander Grube - bass
- Jamie Scott - background vocals, bass
- Theo Hutchcraft - background vocals
- Dan Grech-Marguerat - additional programming
- Tobie Tripp - violin
- Mathias Wang - keyboards, guitar, background vocals, percussion

Production

- Nicholas Rebscher - producer, recording engineer
- George Chung - recording engineer
- Dan Grech-Marguerat - mixing engineer
- Sascha "Busy" Bühren - mastering engineer
- Luke Burgoyne - assistant mixing engineer
- Seb Maletka-Catala - assistant mixing engineer
- Luke Gibbs - recording engineer
- Mathias Wang - producer, recording engineer

== Charts ==
Chart performance for "Sunflowers"
Chart (2026)	Peak position
New Zealand Hot Singles (RMNZ)	29
Slovakia Airplay (ČNS IFPI)	63
UK Physical Singles (OCC)	3
UK Singles Sales (OCC)	11

== Release history ==
Region	Date	Format	Version	Label	Ref.
United States	5 June 2026	CD single	Original; live	BMG	
