= Don't Let It Break Your Heart =

Single by Louis Tomlinson

from the album Walls
- Released: 23 November 2019
- Genre: Pop
- Length: 3:24 (album version); 3:16 (single edit)
- Label: Syco; Arista; 78
- Songwriters: Louis Tomlinson; Stuart Crichton; Cole Citrenbaum; James Newman; Stephen Wrabel
- Producers: Stuart Crichton; Steve Mac

Louis Tomlinson singles chronology
"We Made It" (2019)	"Don't Let It Break Your Heart" (2019)	"Walls" (2020)

Music video
- "Don't Let It Break Your Heart" on YouTube

"Don't Let It Break Your Heart" is a song by English singer-songwriter Louis Tomlinson, and the fourth single from his debut studio album Walls. It was released on 23 November 2019. It features a light guitar melody, which builds up to a lively chorus introducing the drums.

== Background ==
In an official press release, Tomlinson described the track as the one he's "really proud of" and "a song about hope and seeing the glass as half full".

== Critical reception ==
Mike Wass of Idolator described the song as, "a touching anthem about moving forward in the face of hardship," "anthemic, uplifting and very radio-friendly," and Tomlinson's "best solo single." Saskia Postema of Euphoria Magazine called the song "an honest and empowering anthemic ballad" and praised Tomlinson's "conversational and simple yet colorful narration of his own feelings" that "conveys emotion both in his writing and in his voice". Ilana Kaplan of Rolling Stone wrote that the song was "an empowering look at leaving heartbreak behind for something better". Writing for MTV, Patrick Hosken described "Don't Let It Break Your Heart" as "an ode to perseverance that finds rainy-guitar verses giving way to a full-throated, chant-ready chorus that could sit alongside the biggest One Direction arena anthems like 'Steal My Girl'."

== Live performances ==
Tomlinson premiered the track before its official release at Coca Cola Music Experience in Madrid on 14 September 2019. He also performed it live at Telehit Awards in Mexico on 13 November 2019 and at Hits Radio Live Manchester on 17 November 2019. On 23 November 2019, Tomlinson performed the song on The X Factor: Celebrity.

== Music video ==
The music video, starring actor Geoff Bell and directed by Charlie Lightening, was released on 2 December 2019. It continues the narrative from Tomlinson’s previous two videos, "Kill My Mind" and "We Made It", a story about two lovers on the run amid the emotional wreckage of a criminal entanglement. Tomlinson appears in the music video as a getaway driver caught in a gangland heist.

== Charts ==
Chart (2019)	Peak position
Swedish Digital Songs (Billboard)	6
Scotland Singles (Official Charts)	58
UK Singles Downloads (Official Charts)	49
