= Miss You (Louis Tomlinson song) =

Single by Louis Tomlinson
- Released: 1 December 2017
- Genre: Pop rock • pop punk • pop
- Length: 3:02
- Label: Syco; Epic; 78
- Songwriters: Louis Tomlinson; Richard Boardman; Julian Bunetta; Asia Whiteacre; Andrew Haas; Ian Franzino; Pablo Bowman
- Producers: Julian Bunetta; Afterhrs

Louis Tomlinson singles chronology
| "Back to You" (2017) | "Miss You" (2017) | "Two of Us" (2019) |

Music video
- "Miss You" on YouTube

"Miss You" is a song by English singer-songwriter Louis Tomlinson. It was written by Tomlinson, Pablo Bowman, Asia Whitacre, Richard Boardman, Ian Franzino, Andrew Haas and Julian Bunetta, with production handled by the latter three. The song was released on 1 December 2017 via Syco Music, Epic Records and 78 Productions. The song is included as a bonus track on the Japanese version of Tomlinson's debut album Walls. The song received positive reviews from critics, particularly for its production.

== Background ==
On 26 November 2017, Tomlinson announced the single by posting its artwork on Instagram. He said of the song in a statement: "I wrote this song about a time in my life when I was going out partying every night. In hindsight throughout that time I was pretty numb and just going through the motions. Deep down it was always in the back of my mind that what I really missed was the person that I loved. It was important for me to write something really honest."

== Critical reception ==
Ross McNeilage of MTV News regarded the song as "an undeniable anthem that sounds 100% Louis" and "a sing-along party tune about the betrayal of partying". He found the song comparable to "all good pop songs", in which "the depth of the storytelling is disguised with an infectious melody". He also wrote that it sounds similar to a few One Direction songs Tomlinson co-wrote, including "Diana" and "Midnight Memories". Patrick Hosken of the same publication described the song, which "echoes pop-punk", as "the first Tomlinson single to make good on the mention of guitar music". Mike Nied of Idolator called it "an anthemic bop similar to his work with 1D", but with "a more mature spin on the band's buoyant sound". He found potential in the song to be "a breakout moment for the budding solo star". Hugh McIntyre of Forbes felt the song "slightly edgier than the rockier songs produced during One Direction's time together", making it "surprisingly rocky for a musician who seemed eager to leave guitars in the past and move on to electronic dance and pop".

== Music video ==
The song's music video was released on 8 December 2017. In the visual, Louis is distracted from pining over a lost love interest by a group of male friends, as they move on to drink beer at a bar. The plot then shifted to a dance party near the end of the video.

== Live performances ==
Tomlinson first performed the song live on series 14 finale of the UK reality show, The X Factor.

== Credits and personnel ==
Credits adapted from Tidal.

- Louis Tomlinson – songwriting, background vocals
- Pablo Bowman – songwriting
- Afterhrs – songwriting, production, engineering, background vocals, bass, drums, programming, record engineering, synthesizer, vocal production
- Asia Whitacre – songwriting
- Julian Bunetta – songwriting, production, engineering, background vocals, drums, piano, programming, record engineering
- Richard Boardman – songwriting
- Ash Howes – mix engineering
- Randy Merrill – master engineering
- Vicky Matthews – cello
- Polly Wiltshire – viola
- Charlie Brown – violin
- Marianne Haynes – violin
- Matthew Brind – arranging

== Charts ==
| Chart (2017–18) | Peak position |
|---|---|
| Australia (ARIA) | 66 |
| Austria (Ö3 Austria Top 40) | 53 |
| Belgium (Ultratip Bubbling Under Flanders) | 5 |
| Belgium (Ultratip Bubbling Under Wallonia) | 11 |
| Canada (Canadian Digital Song Sales) | 18 |
| Czech Republic (Rádio – Top 100) | 16 |
| Finland Digital Songs (Suomen virallinen lista) | 2 |
| France (SNEP) | 71 |
| Germany (GfK) | 81 |
| Italy (FIMI) | 92 |
| Mexico Ingles Airplay (Billboard) | 8 |
| Netherlands (Single Tip) | 12 |
| New Zealand Heatseekers (Recorded Music NZ) | 4 |
| Portugal (AFP) | 65 |
| Scotland Singles (OCC) | 22 |
| Sweden Heatseeker (Sverigetopplistan) | 13 |
| Switzerland (Schweizer Hitparade) | 67 |
| UK Singles (OCC) | 39 |
| US Bubbling Under Hot 100 (Billboard) | 6 |
| US Digital Song Sales (Billboard) | 15 |
