= Defenceless =

Song by Louis Tomlinson

from the album Walls
- Genre: Pop
- Length: 3:34
- Label: Arista; 78; Syco
- Songwriters: Louis Tomlinson; Sean Douglas; Joe Janiak
- Producer: Janiak

"Defenceless" is a song by English singer-songwriter Louis Tomlinson from his debut studio album, Walls.

== Background ==
Tomlinson first premiered the track when he performed the song live at the Coca Cola Music Experience Festival in Madrid in September 2019. He described the song as a "bit of a cry for help."

In February 2021, fans began "Project Defenceless", to celebrate the one-year anniversary of his debut studio album, Walls, as well as boosting the song's streams and sales. In response to the fans, Tomlinson tweeted, "You guys are relentless. Thank you for all your hard work!"

== Composition ==
"Defenceless" was written by Louis Tomlinson and Sean Douglas, while production was handled by Joe Janiak who also co-wrote the track. Speaking about the song's lyrics, Tomlinson stated, "The conception of this song is kind of about that moment where you're in an argument or feeling particularly vulnerable. Lyrically, I've said in the past it's always been important for me to be honest and vulnerable at times, definitely there's a lot of honesty in there."

== Reception ==
"Defenceless" was met with mixed responses. The song is considered as a "fan favourite" from the album. Mike Nied of Idolator praised Janiak's production on the track stating, "Joe Janiak's production swells and recedes epically across the track. And this is another moment that only gets better the more you listen to it." However, others have criticized the lyrics of the song. Ella Kemp of NME stated, "often he'll just sing the song's title over and over again." CityNews noted, "His lyrics are lazy; he rhymes 'defenceless' with 'fences'."

== Chart performance ==
Due to "Project Defenceless", the song charted on 25 countries' Spotify Viral 50 chart. It also peaked at number one on the iTunes Top Songs Chart in 28 countries, as well as entering the iTunes Worldwide chart at number three. The song reached number 32 on the UK Top 40 chart. "Defenceless" peaked at number 65 on the UK Singles Sales chart and at number 34 on the Belgium Ultratip Flanders chart.

== Personnel ==
Credits for "Defenceless" adapted from album's liner notes.

Musicians

- Louis Tomlinson – lead vocals
- Joe Janiak – backing vocals, bass, acoustic guitar, electric guitar, percussion
- John Foyle – synths, drums
- Carey Watkins – drums

Production

- Joe Janiak – producer
- Dale Becker – mastering
- Dan Grech-Marguerat – mixing

== Charts ==
Chart performance for "Defenceless"
Chart (2021)	Peak position
Belgium (Ultratip Bubbling Under Flanders)	34
UK Singles Sales (OCC)	65
