= Just Like You (Louis Tomlinson song) =

Promotional single by Louis Tomlinson
- Released: 12 October 2017
- Genre: Pop; EDM
- Length: 3:25
- Label: Syco; Epic; 78
- Songwriter(s): Louis Tomlinson; Jesse Thomas; Matthew Burns
- Producer(s): BURNS

Lyric video
- "Just Like You" on YouTube

"Just Like You" is a song recorded by English singer-songwriter Louis Tomlinson, announced on 11 October and released at midnight local time on 12 October 2017. It is the first promotional single from Tomlinson. The song was also written by Tomlinson, Thomas and Burns.

== Background ==
In an interview with Zane Lowe on Beats 1 Radio, Tomlinson called the song "very" autobiographical. “The fans have seen so much and got to know us so well, but I’ve never really had a chance to be as honest like that with music. So that was really refreshing. It was just important for me to write a song that could humanise me as much as possible, and that the fans could really feel like I'm just like them – honest and vulnerable and real.”

== Lyric video ==
A lyric video for the song was released on 17 October 2017, featuring images of Tomlinson interspersed with lyrics as well as newspaper articles relating to politics, mental health, feminism, diversity, LGBTQ+ rights, the Black Lives Matter movement, and the Me Too movement, as well as public figures such as Colin Kaepernick, Malala Yousafzai, and George Michael. Reviewer Saskia Postema of Huffington Post called the video an "unprecedented, though not entirely unsurprising look into Tomlinson's dedication to social justice issues," and went on to say it "push[es] the understanding of the song beyond it being a mere reflection of Tomlinson's personal hardship, and create[s] a connection to general issues of adversity in society instead. By doing so, it seems that the core concept of the tune should be understood as something that not only affects Louis himself, but all of us: The universality of struggle for equal opportunities in life, and the need to be recognized as human beings of equal value."

== Critical reception ==
Rolling Stone's Jon Blistein described the song as "humble", further stating "[Just Like You] has a snappy beat with synths that swell to a wobbling instrumental hook. The production complements Tomlinson's polished vocals and lyrics about how he grapples with everyday highs and lows.”

== Charts ==
Chart (2017–2020)	Peak position
Australia (ARIA)	94
Canada (Canadian Digital Song Sales)	36
Finland Digital Songs (Suomen virallinen lista)	4
France (SNEP)	52
Hungary (Single Top 40)	17
Netherlands Digital Songs (Dutch Charts)	9
New Zealand Heatseekers (RMNZ)	9
Philippines (Philippine Hot 100)	64
Scotland (OCC)	56
Spain (PROMUSICAE)	28
Swedish Digital Songs (Sverigetopplistan)	7
UK Singles (OCC)	99
