= World Innovation Forum (New York City) =

Annual business innovation summit in New York City

- Begins: June 20, 2012
- Ends: June 21, 2012
- Frequency: Annually
- Location: New York City Center
- Inaugurated: 2006
- Most recent: Ongoing
- Participants: 900 attendees
- Website: http://www.wifny.com/

The World Innovation Forum is a business innovation summit held annually in New York City. The event is organized by HSM, an executive education and management content firm.

== Description ==
The World Innovation Forum is a two-day event in which business executives learn ideas and strategies to maximize innovation within their organizations. Officially launched in 2006, the event takes place around May to June of each year in New York City. The event's speakers are top business and intellectual pioneers in the field of innovation. The World Innovation Forum brings together approximately 900 attendees, consisting mostly of senior executives, from over 20 countries and 23 states. In 2007, two forums took place—one was held at Newport Beach in Orange County, California in the Island Hotel in addition to the one in New York City.

=== Participants ===
Past speakers in the World Innovation Forum include sought-after business advisers such as Gary Hamel, Clayton Christensen, and Vijay Govindarajan, as well as distinguished professors such as Dan Ariely.

=== Organizer ===
The event is organized by HSM, an executive education and management content firm which has been holding business conferences globally for over 20 years under the names World Business Forum and ExpoManagement.

== 2012 World Innovation Forum ==
The 2012 World Innovation Forum was held at the New York City Center on June 20–21, 2012 and featured Ray Kurzweil, Sir Ken Robinson, Mohanbir Sawhney, Scott Cook, Jane McGonigal, Henry Chesbrough, Clay Shirky, Guy Kawasaki and Russell Stevens as featured speakers.
