= Back to You (Louis Tomlinson song) =

2017 pop song by Louis Tomlinson featuring Bebe Rexha and Digital Farm Animals

Single by Louis Tomlinson featuring Bebe Rexha and Digital Farm Animals
- Released: 21 July 2017
- Genre: Pop
- Length: 3:10
- Label: Syco; Epic; 78
- Songwriters: Louis Tomlinson; Nicholas Gale; Pablo Bowman; Richard Boardman; Sarah Blanchard
- Producers: Digital Farm Animals; Tommy Danvers

Louis Tomlinson singles chronology
"Just Hold On" (2016)	"Back to You" (2017)	"Miss You" (2017)

Bebe Rexha singles chronology
"The Way I Are (Dance with Somebody)" (2017)	"Back to You" (2017)	"Meant to Be" (2017)

Digital Farm Animals singles chronology
"Digital Love" (2017)	"Back to You" (2017)	"Arms Around Me" (2017)

Music video
- "Back to You" on YouTube

"Back to You" is the second solo single of English singer-songwriter Louis Tomlinson featuring American singer Bebe Rexha and English DJ and producer Digital Farm Animals. It was written by Tomlinson, Digital Farm Animals, Pablo Bowman, Richard Boardman, and Sarah Blanchard, while the production was handled by Digital Farm Animals and Tommy Danvers. The single was released on 21 July 2017; its accompanying music video premiered the same date.

== Background and release ==
"Back to You" is the second solo single released by Louis Tomlinson after the announced hiatus of One Direction. The song was released via his own label, 78 Productions. It was later confirmed Tomlinson signed a solo recording deal with Epic Records.

On 26 June, it was announced via two consecutive tweets from Tomlinson's Twitter that the song would be released at the end of July. The release date was later confirmed as 21 July.

== Composition ==
"Back to You" comprises mid-tempo beats and piano chords. Lars Brandle of Billboard noted an "urban-textured" production. Lyrically, the song discusses returning to an on-again, off-again relationship. Tomlinson declared about its composition:

This song stood out to me across everything I've written. It’s quite minimal in the production; it's something that, even melodically, is quite different to something I would normally do.

== Music video ==
A music video for the song was filmed in Tomlinson's hometown of Doncaster, England in May 2017, subsequently being released alongside the single on 21 July 2017. In the video Tomlinson and Rexha appear in various Doncaster locations, including Doncaster Rovers Football Club's Keepmoat Stadium. As of January 2025, the music video has received more than 510 million views on YouTube.

== Critical reception ==
Mike Wass of Idolator wrote in his review, "As far as 1D solo offerings go, this is fairly solid." Mark Savage of BBC Music described the track as "a brooding pop concoction." In Entertainment Weekly, Ariana Bacle called it "[an] infectious jam."

== Track listing ==
Digital download
No.	Title	Length
1.	"Back to You"	3:10

Digital download – Digital Farm Animals and Louis Tomlinson remix
No.	Title	Length
1.	"Back to You" (Digital Farm Animals and Louis Tomlinson remix)	4:22

Limited edition CD single
No.	Title	Length
1.	"Back to You"	3:10
2.	"Back to You" (Digital Farm Animals and Louis Tomlinson remix)	4:22

== Charts ==
=== Weekly charts ===
Chart (2017–18)	Peak position
Australia (ARIA)	11
Austria (Ö3 Austria Top 40)	21
Belgium (Ultratop 50 Flanders)	30
Belgium (Ultratop 50 Wallonia)	20
Canada Hot 100 (Billboard)	33
Czech Republic Airplay (ČNS IFPI)	8
Czech Republic Singles Digital (ČNS IFPI)	10
Finland (Suomen virallinen lista)	14
France (SNEP)	19
Germany (GfK)	51
Hungary (Rádiós Top 40)	12
Hungary (Single Top 40)	4
Hungary (Stream Top 40)	16
Ireland (IRMA)	11
Italy (FIMI)	52
Malaysia (RIM)	2
Mexico Airplay (Billboard)	39
Netherlands (Dutch Top 40)	17
Netherlands (Mega Top 50)	32
Netherlands (Single Top 100)	22
New Zealand (Recorded Music NZ)	12
Norway (VG-lista)	12
Philippines (Philippine Hot 100)	21
Portugal (AFP)	17
Romania (Airplay 100)	45
Scotland Singles (OCC)	6
Slovakia Airplay (ČNS IFPI)	27
Slovakia Singles Digital (ČNS IFPI)	12
Spain (PROMUSICAE)	81
Sweden (Sverigetopplistan)	38
Switzerland (Schweizer Hitparade)	47
UK Singles (OCC)	8
US Billboard Hot 100	40
US Adult Pop Airplay (Billboard)	31
US Pop Airplay (Billboard)	25

=== Year-end charts ===
Chart (2017)	Position
Australia (ARIA)	93
Hungary (Single Top 40)	88
Hungary (Stream Top 40)	60
Netherlands (Dutch Top 40)	81

Chart (2018)	Position
Hungary (Rádiós Top 40)	100

== Certifications ==
Region	Certification	Certified units/sales
Australia (ARIA)	3× Platinum	210,000^{‡}
Belgium (BRMA)	Gold	10,000^{‡}
Canada (Music Canada)	Platinum	80,000^{‡}
Denmark (IFPI Danmark)	Gold	45,000^{‡}
Italy (FIMI)	Gold	25,000^{‡}
Mexico (AMPROFON)	2× Platinum	120,000^{‡}
New Zealand (RMNZ)	Platinum	30,000^{‡}
Norway (IFPI Norway)	Platinum	60,000^{‡}
Poland (ZPAV)	Gold	10,000^{‡}
Sweden (GLF)	Gold	20,000^{‡}
United Kingdom (BPI)	Platinum	600,000^{‡}
United States (RIAA)	Platinum	1,000,000^{‡}
^{‡} Sales+streaming figures based on certification alone.

== Release history ==
Region	Date	Format	Version	Label(s)	Ref.
United States	21 July 2017	Digital download	Original	78 Productions; Epic	
Italy	21 July 2017	Contemporary hit radio	Original	Sony	
United States	25 July 2017	Contemporary hit radio	Original	Epic	
United States	31 July 2017	Hot adult contemporary	Original	Epic	
Various	4 August 2017	Digital download	Digital Farm Animals and Louis Tomlinson Remix	78 Productions; Epic	

== Awards and nominations ==
Year	Organization	Award	Result	Ref.
2017	CelebMix Awards	Best Collaboration	Won	
2018	MPS Online Awards	Favorite Collaboration	Won	
