= We Made It (Louis Tomlinson song) =

Single by Louis Tomlinson

from the album Walls
- Released: 24 October 2019
- Studio: ADP Music Studios (London, England); Enemy Dojo (Calabasas, California)
- Genre: Britpop
- Length: 3:21
- Label: Syco; Arista; 78
- Songwriters: Louis Tomlinson; Levi Lennox; Julian Bunetta; John Ryan II; Amish Patel
- Producers: ADP; Dan Grech-Marguerat; John Ryan; Julian Bunetta; Levi Lennox

Louis Tomlinson singles chronology
"Kill My Mind" (2019)	"We Made It" (2019)	"Don't Let It Break Your Heart" (2019)

Music video
- "We Made It" on YouTube

"We Made It" is a song by English singer-songwriter Louis Tomlinson, and the third single from his debut studio album Walls. It was released on 24 October 2019, with the music video being released the same day.

== Background ==
Tomlinson wrote the track in 2017, and teased it in February 2018. While there are parts of the track that concern Tomlinson "struggl[ing] to find [his] place" in the early days of being part of One Direction, most of the track was written about his relationship with his girlfriend Eleanor Calder as well as his fans, with Tomlinson remarking that the "sentiment of the chorus" is a "message to them".

"This song, I wrote about maybe two and a half years ago now and I want it to be further along in my writing process so I could kind of release music a bit more frequently and then get into the album. I'm really proud of it. It originated as a title and a concept when we first started writing the song and it started as a bit of a message between me and the fans. I was thinking about that first tour show like what does we made it mean to me and thinking about the first show and that feeling of as a collective, not just me. Thinking about all the patient people that waited for me in that so that's where it started. The verses, I was kind of just being a bit more visual and talking about my relationship when I was on the world tour with the band, but my girlfriend was still at university. I was going to visit her and stay with her so it was kind of an interesting take as well."

— Louis Tomlinson about the meaning behind "We Made It"

== Critical reception ==
Claire Shaffer of Rolling Stone described the song as "Britpop-tinged", with lyrics that feature "Tomlinson reflecting on a struggling relationship, [and] expressing pride in how they've made it through the hardships". Writing for MTV, Patrick Hosken said that Tomlinson sings "some of his most personal lyrics yet" on the track. Lilly Pace of Billboard called Tomlinson's single "a combined love letter to his girlfriend and thank you to fans" and described his performance on The Late Late Show with James Corden as "angelic".

== Music video ==
Tomlinson filmed the music video for the single with director Charlie Lightening at an English seaside arcade and boardwalk. It was released on 24 October along with the song, and features Tomlinson singing while a couple "overcome an obstacle" in their relationship, "set to a backdrop of summer-romance imagery". Tomlinson called it a "more cinematic" video than that of his previous single, "Kill My Mind".

== Live performances ==
Tomlinson performed the song for the first time on The Late Late Show with James Corden on 28 October 2019. On 15 November 2019, he performed the song on BBC Children in Need.

== Charts ==
Chart (2019–2020)	Peak position
US Pop Airplay (Billboard)	32

== Release history ==
Region	Date	Format	Label	Ref.
Various	24 October 2019	Digital download; streaming	Arista	
United States	4 November 2019	Hot adult contemporary	Arista	
United States	5 November 2019	Top 40 radio	Arista	
