= Walls (Louis Tomlinson song) =

Single by Louis Tomlinson

from the album Walls
- Released: 17 January 2020
- Genre: Britpop; rock
- Length: 3:49
- Label: Syco; Arista; 78
- Songwriters: Louis Tomlinson; Jamie Hartman; Noel Gallagher; Dave Gibson; Jacob Manson
- Producer: Jamie Hartman

Louis Tomlinson singles chronology
"Don't Let It Break Your Heart" (2019)	"Walls" (2020)	"Bigger Than Me" (2022)

Music video
- "Walls" on YouTube

"Walls" is a song by English singer-songwriter Louis Tomlinson, the fifth and the final single and the title track from his debut studio album of the same name. It was released on 17 January 2020.

== Background ==
"It’s about coming home having been on tour, soon after we’d split. I found some of my girlfriend’s clothes in the cupboard and it hit me what I’d done."

— Louis Tomlinson on the meaning behind "Walls"

Tomlinson said that the song is "about overcoming some of your problems and learning from your mistakes. It's looking back at a certain time of my life and I'm sure there's lots of people who can relate to that idea of being alone and waking up, being used to having someone there, then they're not. It's a bit of, "Oh no, I've fucked it up, yeah. But I've understood that now and I've come back stronger. You learn from your mistakes, and the song is about owning them, putting your hands up and saying 'I know what I did was wrong, but I understand it a bit better now'".

Live strings for the song were recorded at Angel Recording Studios in London. Tomlinson said that when he came to the studio and saw that "there must have been 25 musicians in there, all for my song", it was "a proper tear-jerking moment already and I've never felt a shiver like it".

Tomlinson stated that he loved "the indie sound of the song" and its "circular nature – it opens and closes with the same lyric". Tomlinson also claimed to lift parts of Oasis songs - "Cast No Shadow", "Stop Crying Your Heart Out" and "Acquiesce", crediting Oasis songwriter Noel Gallagher.

== Critical reception ==
Mike Nied of Idolator described the song as "an ode to perseverance and overcoming the odds", "a string-led gem with a thoughtful message [on which] Louis sings about overcoming obstacles between him and a loved one". Writing for MTV, Madeline Roth called "Walls" "an emotional declaration of strength" on which Tomlinson "acknowledges the struggles he's faced with introspective, heartbreaking observations", "cracks the sadness open and lets a little light in by revealing that the hard times have made him a stronger man", and praised the addition of a live orchestra to the song which "ups the emotional ante" and "takes this ballad to beautiful heights". Charu Sinha of Vulture called the track "slow and introspective", "easy listening, lonely pop rock reminiscent of the 2000s (think early Green Day, but with an inspirational, self-help slant)". Phil Arnold of Music Talkers called "Walls" "a very good song, with all the components that will appeal to a wide demographic" and praised its "smart production" and Tomlinson's "accomplished song-writing" and "mature vocal".

"When the song starts you get a classic feeling of piano and guitar working together to provide a really well crafted introduction then the vocal has a retro EQ on it to give atmosphere to the lyrics. The song talks about high walls being put in place as barriers, but actually personality can break these walls down, being strong to power through. As the chorus comes in, the sound builds, the guitars get bigger and strings sit behind to give it a rich and very memorable turn. As the song progresses into the next verse and chorus, more instrumentation builds and creates a song that has some real class about it. There’s bits of Indie in it, there are elements of traditional ballads and pop too. What really stands out though, is the fact that this is an original and has been written by someone who’s not only a singer and performer, but also a very talented songwriter who writes catchy melodies and supports that with lyrics that go a bit deeper than your average pop song and make you really think about the meaning. "

— Phil Arnold of Music Talkers about "Walls"

== Music video ==
The music video, directed by Charlie Lightening, was filmed in Morocco and released on 20 January 2020. The video begins with Tomlinson roaming the Moroccan desert where he encounters a mysterious door, walks through a series of glass panes and sits on a chair perched halfway up a brick wall (a reference to a music video for "Live Forever" by Oasis whose former member Noel Gallagher is credited as one of the co-writers on "Walls"). After Tomlinson enters through the door, he sprawls out on the floor of a ballroom near dancing guests and wanders through a crowd of masked strangers. At the song's climax, he and his band perform on a glowing platform as the light dims.

== Live performances ==
Tomlinson performed the track for the first time live on 22 January 2020 on The One Show. On 30 January 2020 Tomlinson performed the song on The Tonight Show Starring Jimmy Fallon. On 31 January 2020 he performed it on The Today Show.

== Charts ==
Chart (2020)	Peak position
New Zealand Hot Singles (RMNZ)	33
Scotland Singles (Official Charts)	97
UK Singles Downloads (Official Charts)	77

== Release history ==
Region	Date	Format	Label	Ref.
Various	31 January 2020	Digital download; streaming	Arista	
United States	31 January 2020	Alternative	Arista	
