= Just Hold On =

Single by Steve Aoki and Louis Tomlinson

from the album Neon Future III
- Released: 10 December 2016
- Recorded: 2016
- Genre: EDM; dance-pop; house
- Length: 3:18
- Label: Ultra
- Songwriters: Louis Tomlinson; Steve Aoki; Eric Rosse; Alexandra Yatchenko; Nolan Lambroza
- Producers: Aoki; Sir Nolan; Jay Pryor; Julian Bunetta

Steve Aoki singles chronology
"Supernova (Interstellar)" (2016)	"Just Hold On" (2016)	"Alive" (2017)

Louis Tomlinson singles chronology
"Just Hold On" (2016)	"Back to You" (2017)

Music video
- "Just Hold On" on YouTube

"Just Hold On" is a song by American DJ Steve Aoki and English singer-songwriter Louis Tomlinson, released through Ultra Music as the latter's debut solo single on 10 December 2016. The song was written by Aoki and Tomlinson alongside Eric Rosse, Sasha Alex Sloan and Sir Nolan, and was produced by Aoki, Sir Nolan, Jay Pryor, and Julian Bunetta. Aoki and Tomlinson performed the song for the first time on the 2016 series finale of The X Factor (UK). They also performed the song on The Tonight Show Starring Jimmy Fallon in 2017.

"Just Hold On" debuted at number two on the UK Singles Chart, and number 52 on the US Billboard Hot 100, making it Aoki's highest-charting song in both countries. The song's music video was released on 8 March 2017. The song reached number one on the Billboard Dance/Electronic Digital Song Sales. The song is also included as a bonus track on the Japanese version of Tomlinson's debut album Walls.

== Background and release ==
"Just Hold On" is the first solo music project by Tomlinson after One Direction began their first official break in December 2015. After watching Aoki perform in Las Vegas, Tomlinson reached out to him via Twitter asking if they could work together. A preview of the song was released on 9 December.

Tomlinson's debut performance of "Just Hold On" on The X Factor (UK) came just days after it was announced that his mother, Johannah Deakin, died at the age of 43 after a battle with leukemia. The song was made available on the iTunes Store and streaming services on 10 December 2016.

Speaking about the song in retrospect with Herald & Review, he revealed he was chasing a radio hit with "Just Hold On", feeling he "had to" go after a hit. Although, he stated it was a song he was "immensely proud of."

== Composition ==
"Just Hold On" is written in the key of B major with a tempo of 115 beats per minute in common time. The verses follow a chord progression of G♯5–E5–B5–F♯5, and Tomlinson's vocals span from F♯_{3} to B_{4}.

The song was originally written as a "fight song for everyday life struggles," but due to the death of Tomlinson's mother, the track became a "personal tribute." Tomlinson told On Air with Ryan Seacrest, "When we wrote the song, it was more about any kind of hardship in life you might have to struggle with. That wasn't the intention deliberately. It's kind of saying don't feel sorry for yourself; keep fighting, keep strong. So those two kind of fell into place and that obviously made the performance more personal for me."

== Critical reception ==
In the website Idolator, Christina Lee wrote the song is an "uplifting EDM fare that comes standard with summer music festivals, though also a brand new direction for Louis after five One Direction albums." Daily Express also called the track "fittingly uplifting". We Got This Covered described Aoki's production, stating: "Aoki layers in mid tempo four on the floor rhythms, injecting a tropical vibe moving into the chorus with exotic melodies and undeniable groove; it looks like Aoki is hoping to get in on the EDM-pop crossover trend... of 2016. Thankfully, he doesn't go the future bass route, opting instead to craft a tropical pop production elevated by Louis Tomlinson's smooth vocal approach. 'Just Hold On' is definitely catchy enough to get some heavy radio play, and Tomlinson's presence on the song may just be enough to score Steve Aoki a full-fledged pop hit."

== Music video ==
The music video for "Just Hold On" premiered on 8 March 2017. The video features two people time traveling and running around country-to-country, from England to the United States. Markos Papadatos of Digital Journal described the video as "youthful with a liberating vibe to it."

== Awards and nominations ==
Awards and nominations for "Just Hold On"
Year	Organization	Award	Result	Ref(s)
2017	Teen Choice Awards	Choice Electronic/Dance Song	Nominated	
2017	Teen Choice Awards	Choice Music Collaboration	Won	

== Charts ==
=== Weekly charts ===
Chart (2016–17)	Peak position
Australia (ARIA)	20
Austria (Ö3 Austria Top 40)	8
Belgium (Ultratop 50 Flanders)	26
Belgium (Ultratop 50 Wallonia)	38
Canada Hot 100 (Billboard)	40
CIS Airplay (TopHit)	79
Czech Republic Singles Digital (ČNS IFPI)	15
Denmark (Tracklisten)	22
Finland (Suomen virallinen lista)	7
France (SNEP)	8
Germany (GfK)	32
Greece Digital Songs (IFPI Greece)	4
Hungary (Single Top 40)	4
Ireland (IRMA)	7
Italy (FIMI)	25
Japan Hot 100 (Billboard)	92
Malaysia (RIM)	20
Mexico Airplay (Billboard)	3
Netherlands (Single Top 100)	27
New Zealand (Recorded Music NZ)	34
Norway (VG-lista)	17
Poland Airplay (ZPAV)	36
Portugal (AFP)	13
Russia Airplay (Tophit)	77
Scottish Singles Sales (Official Charts)	1
Slovakia Singles Digital (ČNS IFPI)	8
Spain (Promusicae)	55
Sweden (Sverigetopplistan)	15
Switzerland (Schweizer Hitparade)	26
UK Singles (Official Charts)	2
US Billboard Hot 100	52
US Hot Dance/Electronic Songs (Billboard)	7
US Pop Airplay (Billboard)	35

=== Year-end charts ===
Chart (2016)	Position
Australia Dance (ARIA)	64
Chart (2017)	Position
Australia Dance (ARIA)	26
Hungary (Stream Top 40)	63
Latvia Airplay (LaIPA)	38
US Hot Dance/Electronic Songs (Billboard)	24

== Certifications ==
Region	Certification	Certified units/sales
Australia (ARIA)	Platinum	70,000^{‡}
Belgium (BRMA)	Gold	10,000^{‡}
Canada (Music Canada)	Platinum	80,000^{‡}
Denmark (IFPI Danmark)	Gold	45,000^{‡}
France (SNEP)	Gold	100,000^{‡}
Germany (BVMI)	Gold	200,000^{‡}
Italy (FIMI)	Platinum	50,000^{‡}
Mexico (AMPROFON)	2× Platinum+Gold	150,000^{‡}
New Zealand (RMNZ)	Platinum	30,000^{‡}
Poland (ZPAV)	Gold	10,000^{‡}
Spain (Promusicae)	Gold	30,000^{‡}
Sweden (GLF)	Platinum	40,000^{‡}
Switzerland (IFPI Switzerland)	Gold	15,000^{‡}
United Kingdom (BPI)	Platinum	600,000^{‡}
United States (RIAA)	Gold	500,000^{‡}
^{‡} Sales+streaming figures based on certification alone.
