= Kill My Mind =

2019 song by Louis Tomlinson

Single by Louis Tomlinson

from the album Walls
- Released: 5 September 2019
- Genre: Indie rock; pop punk
- Length: 3:40
- Label: Syco; Arista; 78
- Songwriters: Louis Tomlinson; Jamie Hartman; Sean Douglas
- Producer: Jamie Hartman

Louis Tomlinson singles chronology
"Two of Us" (2019)	"Kill My Mind" (2019)	"We Made It" (2019)

Music video
- "Kill My Mind" on YouTube

"Kill My Mind" is a song by English singer-songwriter Louis Tomlinson. It was released on 5 September 2019, as the second single from his debut album, Walls. It is the second single released by Tomlinson on Arista Records since signing with them in early 2019.

== Promotion ==
In June 2019, Louis Tomlinson announced his plans to release music more frequently, stating "At the moment it's three or four months in between, so I think I'm going to do two or three at once and get myself back on the road". On 29 August 2019, he posted the artwork for "Kill My Mind", writing "So happy to finally announce my new single #KillMyMind will be out a week today! Soooooo excited for you all to hear what I've been working on!". It was released a week later, premiering on Hits Radio Manchester.

== Background ==
Tomlinson described "Kill My Mind" as, "a song about having fun and doing silly things when you’re younger," and, "going through an experimental phase in your youth, and doing things that might not be good for you, but they are exciting." He said that "this single is the closest I’ve got in all of my singles to where I feel comfortable. It's the kind of influences that I have and stuff that I listened to growing up. Where I’m at with this single I’m actually really proud and relieved to finally find my place, find my lane musically".

== Reception ==
Rob Copsey of the Official Charts Company wrote that Tomlinson "sounds at his most confident and comfortable yet" on "Kill My Mind", and added that there is "something very turn-of-the-noughties-indie-pop about" it. iHeartRadio's Lindsey Smith described the song as a "punk-influenced track with heavy guitars and drums", and thought that it "really showcases his talent and ability to perform different genres effortlessly". Jason Lipshutz of Billboard described the track as "the song that lets a pop star rock out" and called it "brash, swaggering and catchy as all hell". Writing for MTV, Patrick Hosken said that on "Kill My Mind" Tomlinson "sounds bigger, more stadium-ready, and more like himself than he ever has", described the track as being "bigger, slicker and rockier than anything he [Louis]'s ever done" and called Louis "the Britpop star he was born to be".

== Music video ==
The music video was directed by Charlie Lightening and released on 13 September 2019. It features Tomlinson singing in front of a crowd of fans intercut with scenes of a loved-up couple. Tomlinson said that "conceptually, for “Kill My Mind”, I wanted it to be like all the Oasis videos I love. I wanted it to be more about the performance. Not focusing too much on a narrative and just being lit really well. I think we pulled it off".

== Live performances ==
Tomlinson premiered the track for the first time live at Coca-Cola Music Experience in Madrid on 14 September 2019.

== Charts ==
Chart (2019–2020)	Peak position
Czech Republic Airplay (ČNS IFPI)	16
Scotland Singles (Official Charts)	99
Swedish Digital Songs (Sverigetopplistan)	10
UK Singles Downloads (Official Charts)	93
