= Creatures of the Street =

Studio album by Jobriath
- Released: January 1974
- Genre: Glam rock
- Length: 35:05
- Label: Elektra
- Producer: Jobriath; Edwin H. Kramer

Jobriath chronology
Jobriath (1973)	Creatures of the Street (1974)	Lonely Planet Boy (2004)

Professional ratings
Review scores
Source	Rating
AllMusic	2/5 stars

Creatures of the Street is the second album by the glam rock artist Jobriath. It was released in 1974 on Elektra Records. The album was compiled from the sessions for its predecessor. Highlights include the jaunty "Ooh La La", the almost folky "Scumbag", the orchestral "Dietrich/Fondyke" and "Movie Queen" from the previous album were originally intended to be one track.

Among the listed guest stars for the album is "Chris Peterson (Courtesy of Stormy Forest Records)". This is a misspelled name for Kris Peterson, the same vocalist that appears on the Frank Zappa album Waka/Jawaka.

The song, "Scumbag" mentions the Zum Zum restaurant chain, and in turn inspired the reference to "Zom Zom's" in the Gary Numan song "Down in the Park."

== Track listing ==
All tracks composed by Jobriath.

Side One
No.	Title	Length
1.	"Heartbeat"	2:44
2.	"Dietrich/Fondyke (a Brief History of Movie Music)"	2:18
3.	"Street Corner Love"	2:33
4.	"Ooh La La"	4:08
5.	"Scumbag"	2:48
6.	"Ecubyan"	2:40
Total length:		17:11

Side Two
No.	Title	Length
7.	"Good Time"	2:50
8.	"Sister Sue"	3:05
9.	"What a Pretty"	1:28
10.	"Liten Up"	4:05
11.	"Gone Tomorrow"	3:43
12.	"Ooh La La (Reprise and Exit Music)"	2:43
Total length:		17:54

== Personnel ==
=== Musicians ===
- Jobriath - performer ("Principal Creature")
- Billy Schwartz, Gregg Diamond, Hayden Wayne, Jim Gregory, Steve Love - performers ("Principal Creature")
- Carl Hall, Heather MacRae, Rosetta Hightower, Tasha Thomas, Zenobia - backing vocals ("Creature Without Whom")
- George Ricci, Jerry Patterson, John Paul Jones, Kris Peterson, Peter Frampton, The Jobriath Symphony Orchestra - musicians ("Guest Star")
- Michael Reeves - conductor
- Andy Muson, Pretty Purdie, Cornell Dupree, Gordon Edwards, Jerry Jemmott, Jimmy Maelen, John Syomis, Ken Bichel - musicians ("Important Players")
- Jerry Brandt - presenter

=== Technical ===
- Jobriath - director, producer, engineer, writer, arrangement, orchestration, painting
- Edwin H. Kramer - producer, engineer
- Bob Fisher - mastering
- Glen Christensen - art direction
- Shiah Grumet - design
- Gered Mankowitz - photography
