= Blue Skies (Jamiroquai song) =

Single by Jamiroquai

from the album Rock Dust Light Star
- Released: 1 November 2010
- Genre: Pop rock; power ballad; soft rock
- Length: 3:52 (original mix)
- Label: Mercury Records
- Songwriters: Matt Johnson; Jay Kay
- Producer: Jay Kay

Jamiroquai singles chronology
"White Knuckle Ride" (2010)	"Blue Skies" (2010)	"Lifeline" (2011)

Music video
- "Blue Skies" on YouTube

"Blue Skies" is the second single from British funk/acid jazz group Jamiroquai's studio album Rock Dust Light Star. The single was released via digital download on 1 November 2010. The song was written by band frontman Jay Kay and Matt Johnson. It is the band's second single to be released under Mercury Records. The single did not receive an official physical release because it was released on the same date as the group's album. The video for the single was made available on the group's YouTube account on 25 September. The track peaked at number 76 on the UK Singles Chart.

== Music video ==
The music video shows Jay Kay riding a Harley Davidson fat boy motorbike through the outback of Almería, attempting to find a beauty spot where he can look at the Blue Skies, hence the title of the song. The video shows Jay riding his bike through many roads of Spain, only to stop in a desert and to be taken off by a helicopter. After he leaves in the helicopter, he tracks back to see the bike, which is sitting in the desert. After doing this, he leaves.

The video was directed by Howard Greenhalgh who directed Jamiroquai's previous music video for single "White Knuckle Ride".

== Track listing ==
Digital Download

1. "Blue Skies" – 4:02

== Remixes ==
Fred Falke Mixes

- "Blue Skies (Fred Falke Remix)" – 7:48
- "Blue Skies (Fred Falke Instrumental)" – 7:40
- "Blue Skies (Fred Falke Radio Edit)" – 4:08

Linus Loves Mix

- "Blue Skies (Linus Loves Remix)" – 7:30

Flux Pavilion Mix

- "Blue Skies (Flux Pavilion Remix)" – 5:46

== Charts ==
Chart (2010)	Peak position
Belgian Tip Chart (Wallonia)	12
Dutch Singles Chart	79
Italian Singles Chart	18
UK Singles Chart	76
