= Automaton (song) =

- 10-inch vinyl cover art

Single by Jamiroquai

from the album Automaton
- B-side: "Nights Out in the Jungle"
- Released: 27 January 2017
- Recorded: 2015–2016
- Studio: Chillington (Buckinghamshire, England); AIR (London)
- Genre: Disco; funk; synth-pop; dance-pop
- Length: 4:48
- Label: Virgin EMI
- Songwriters: Matt Johnson; Jay Kay
- Producers: Matt Johnson; Jay Kay

Jamiroquai singles chronology
| "Lifeline" (2011) | "Automaton" (2017) | "Cloud 9" (2017) |

Music video
- "Automaton" on YouTube

"Automaton" is a song by the English funk band Jamiroquai. It was released as the lead single from their eighth album, Automaton (2017), on 27 January 2017. The song peaked at number 36 in France, number 61 in Japan, number 65 in Scotland, and number 31 on the U.S. Billboard Dance/Electronic Songs chart.

== Composition ==
"Automaton" was written and produced by Jamiroquai members Matt Johnson and Jay Kay. Kay also provided vocals for the track. It is a disco, funk, and dance-pop song that has drawn several comparisons to the works of French electronic music duo Daft Punk. The song features an instrumental that contains synthesisers which have been compared with those from the soundtrack for the 1982 film Tron, as well as vocals that feature a vocoder effect. Near the end of the song, Kay engages in a rap. Both Billboard and PopMatters compared his rap verse to the work of Afrika Bambaataa. "Automaton" was described as a "sci-fi wonderland of vocoders and electronic whirs" by Ben Kaye of Consequence of Sound. Daniel Kreps of Rolling Stone described the song's progression as "propulsive verses [that] suddenly make way for the track's booming chorus before abruptly turning into a Daft Punk-like bridge where a synthetic voice chants 'I'm automaton.'"

== Release ==
"Automaton" premiered on 26 January 2017 during The Jo Whiley Show on BBC Radio 2 and was released as a single the following day, acting as their first single in seven years. A music video was released alongside the song on the same day. It was announced on 22 March that the song would receive a release as a limited edition 10-inch vinyl in the UK for Record Store Day 2017, which takes place on 22 April. "Nights Out in the Jungle" acts as the vinyl's B-side.

== Music video ==
A music video for "Automaton" was released to coincide with its release. The video was directed by Charlie Lightening, with some creative direction done by Jay Kay. A nuclear explosion is shown at the very start of the video; Daniel Kreps thought it was fitting, as the Doomsday Clock had moved closer to midnight on the day of its release. Kay's usage of headgear in videos continues, as he dons a light-up helmet in this one. Throughout the video, Kay explores different locations, including, Orford Ness (many times throughout the video), a post-apocalyptic London, and the tunnels of its Underground railroad network. Science fiction imagery is shown throughout, as well.

== Track listing ==
Download and streaming release

| No. | Title | Length |
|---|---|---|
| 1. | "Automaton" | 4:48 |
| 2. | "Automaton (Deetron Remix)" | 6:45 |

Vinyl release

Side A
| No. | Title | Length |
|---|---|---|
| 1. | "Automaton" | 4:48 |

Side B
| No. | Title | Length |
|---|---|---|
| 1. | "Nights Out in the Jungle" | 5:09 |

== Charts ==
Chart performance for "Automaton"
| Chart (2017) | Peak position |
|---|---|
| Belgium Dance (Ultratop Flanders) | 37 |
| France (SNEP) | 36 |
| Hungary (Single Top 40) | 37 |
| Japan Hot 100 (Billboard) | 61 |
| Scotland Singles (OCC) | 65 |
| US Hot Dance/Electronic Songs (Billboard) | 31 |

== Release history ==
Release history and formats for "Automaton"
| Region | Date | Format | Label | Catalogue no. |
|---|---|---|---|---|
| Various | 27 January 2017 | Download; streaming | Virgin EMI | 00602557356496 |
| United Kingdom | 22 April 2017 | 10" vinyl (Record Store Day) | Virgin EMI | VST 2155 |
