= Standing on the Shoulders of Kitties =

- Film poster
- Directed by: Charlie Lightening
- Written by: Mike Smith
- Based on: Trailer Park Boys by Mike Clattenburg
- Produced by: Mike Smith; Robb Wells; John Paul Tremblay
- Starring: Mike Smith; Robb Wells; John Paul Tremblay; Patrick Roach; Billy Bob Thornton
- Cinematography: Daniel Lightening
- Edited by: Pablo D'Ambrosi; Jeremy Harty
- Production company: BATS Film
- Distributed by: Rollercoaster Entertainment
- Release dates: December 6, 2024 (Canada, United States); January 10, 2025 (United Kingdom)
- Running time: 111 minutes
- Countries: Canada; United Kingdom
- Language: English
- Box office: $210,000

Standing on the Shoulders of Kitties: The Bubbles and the Shitrockers Story is a 2024 Canadian musical comedy film, directed by Charlie Lightening, and is based on the Canadian television series Trailer Park Boys. It is the fourth film in the Trailer Park Boys franchise, and the sequel to Trailer Park Boys: Don't Legalize It and is the first film not to be directed by series creator Mike Clattenburg. The film follows the series' breakout character Bubbles (portrayed by Mike Smith) and the formation of his country band, the Shitrockers. Smith, in addition to playing Bubbles and serving as co-producer, also wrote the script for this film. The film features guest appearances from Billy Bob Thornton, Ronnie Wood, Eddie Kramer and Eric Burdon.

== Plot ==
After holding auditions in Ricky's trailer, Bubbles forms a new country-folk band called The Shitrockers. Bubbles submits their first song, "Kitties Are So Nice", to a radio contest, but the deejay mercilessly mocks him on-air. Undeterred, the band embarks on two-week circuit tour of Legion Halls with weekend trailer park supervisor Randy serving as their roadie. Their tour concludes with a show at a provincial prison, where their performance to a riot results in a viral video. The sudden exposure lands them an invitation to open for Billy Bob Thornton's band, The Boxmasters, on a European tour.

After their European premiere in Prague, Bubbles is overwhelmed with excitement after meeting Thornton and Rolling Stones guitarist Ronnie Wood, and suffers involuntary urination. His bandmates abandon him to attend an afterparty orgy, leaving Bubbles embarrassed and hurt. Trouble escalates in Amsterdam when the band drinks Thornton's liquor, leading his strict manager, Tom Mayhue, to unleash his wrath on Bubbles. The chaos continues in Berlin when Bubbles mistakenly takes a media interview meant for The Boxmasters. Things take an even stranger turn in Liverpool when Randy is censured for sleeping with the father of a Boxmasters member.

The final straw comes when Bubbles involuntarily urinates on stage and, while trying to deescalate a confrontation, accidentally electrocutes himself and voids his bowels. The band is unceremoniously dismissed from the tour and Bubbles uses what money he has to get The Shitrockers home. Stranded and broke, Bubbles and Randy resort to hitchhiking and busking their way to London. Desperate for cash, Randy revives his gigolo alter-ego, Smokey, to prostitute himself for plane tickets, while Bubbles frantically calls Ricky and Julian for help. The next morning, Ricky and Julian find Bubbles sleeping in a phone booth, refusing to leave without Randy.

Just as things seem hopeless, Billy Bob Thornton reaches out, wanting to make amends. He arranges for a car to bring them to a celebrity party at Abbey Road Studios, where Bubbles reunites with Thornton and Mayhue, who offer a heartfelt apology. There, they also find Randy, in an apparent relationship with a fellow patron. The moment is soon interrupted by Ricky crashing the session, throwing out the performing band so that Bubbles – assisted by legendary producer Eddie Kramer – can fulfill his lifelong dream of recording at Abbey Road. Initially set on performing "Kitties Are So Nice", Bubbles instead pours his heart into a new song, "Standing on the Shoulders of Kitties". With Ronnie Wood and other musicians joining in, the song builds into an emotional finale as the crowd sings the outro.

== Cast ==
- Mike Smith as Bubbles
- Robb Wells as Ricky
- John Paul Tremblay as Julian
- Patrick Roach as Randy
- Billy Bob Thornton as himself
- Ronnie Wood as himself
- Tom Mayhue as himself
- Brad Stella as Waylon
- Zack Selwyn as Dwight
- Eric Burdon as himself
- Martin Freeman as himself
- Robert Sheehan as Randy's date
- Duff McKagan as himself
- Maisy Stella as herself
- Lennon Stella as herself
- Rick Nielsen as himself
- Eddie Kramer as himself
- Sherry Brown as Manager
- Peter Anthony as second Radio DJ
- Michael Blight as Party guest
- Richard Donat as Big Hawk
- Graham Ferguson as third Inmate
- Susan Holmes-McKagan as herself
- Sebastain Labelle as second Guard
- Chris Lawrence as second Old guy singer
- Alexandra MacLean as third Radio DJ
- Marc Daniel Nelson as himself
- Ryan Rogerson as Richie Spinz
- Tim Wile as first Inmate
- Jack Barry as Party goer
- Simon Howard as Party goer

== Production ==
This is the first Trailer Park Boys film without original series creator Mike Clattenburg's involvement.

This is also the first without actor John Dunsworth's involvement, following his death in 2017. Dunsworth played often-drunk Sunnyvale Trailer Park supervisor Jim Lahey in the original show, and the first three films.

Filming locations in Europe include London, England; Glasgow, Scotland; Prague, Czech Republic; Berlin, Germany; and Liverpool, England. Filming also took place in Dartmouth, Nova Scotia.

== Release ==
The film was released nationwide in Canada on December 6, 2024, with a limited theatrical release in the United States beginning the same day. The film premiered in the UK and Ireland on January 10, 2025, according to Swearnet.com.

To coincide with the release of this film, the Shitrockers released an album entitled Longhauler on CD, vinyl, and for digital download, on November 1, 2024, featuring vocals from Smith, Thornton, and Wood.

== Reception ==
Derek Chen of Spectrum Culture called the film "a late contender for the worst movie of the year."

Leslie Felperin of The Guardian gave the film two out of five stars and wrote, "[T]he comic timing and bonhomie of the ensemble is sort of infectious, and (what do you know) some of the songs are pretty darn catchy. That doesn't quite make up for the fact that the film drags on far longer than it needs to, but the algorithm won't mind in the slightest."

Michael Talbot-Haynes of Film Threat gave the film a score of 9.5 out of 10, writing, "We finally have a movie set in the Trailer Park Boys universe that is so good it rises above being a companion piece to the show and is a great motion picture in its own right."
