= Lifeline (Jamiroquai song) =

Single by Jamiroquai

from the album Rock Dust Light Star
- Released: 24 January 2011
- Genre: Alternative rock; funk rock; dance-rock; jazz fusion
- Length: 4:40 (album version); 3:34 (single edit)
- Label: Mercury Records
- Songwriters: Matt Johnson; Jay Kay; Robert Harris
- Producer: Jay Kay

Jamiroquai singles chronology
"Blue Skies" (2010)	"Lifeline" (2011)	"Automaton" (2017)

Music video
- "Lifeline" on YouTube

"Lifeline" is the third single from British funk/acid jazz band Jamiroquai's studio album, Rock Dust Light Star. The single was released via Digital Download on 24 January 2011. The song was written by band frontman Jay Kay and Matt Johnson. It is the band's third single to be released under Mercury Records. The single did not receive an official physical release. It appears that the Jamiroquai logo typeface has been stretched vertically for this release. The video for the single was made available on the group's YouTube account on 7 January 2011. All three singles from Rock Dust Light Star have identical cover artwork, with the exception of the song title, which is printed in a different colour each time.

== Music video ==
The music video features black-and-white footage of the band's Dynamite and Rock Dust Light Star tours, intertwined with footage of Jay Kay performing the song. The video also features footage of the group meeting fans, staying in a hotel and performing the song on various television music programmes.

== Track listing ==
Digital Download

1. "Lifeline" – 3:34

== Remixes ==
Piero Pirupa Mix

- "Lifeline (Pirupa Deadline Remix)" – 7:05

Shook Mix

- "Lifeline (Shook Remix)" – 5:38
