= Zum Zum =

US restaurant chain, 1960s to 1980s

- Industry: Restaurants
- Founded: 1964 (62 years ago)
- Founder: Joe Baum
- Defunct: 1980s
- Headquarters: New York, New York, U.S.
- Number of locations: 17 (1970)
- Products: Fast food German cuisine

Zum Zum was a New York City-based restaurant chain that operated from the 1960s to the 1980s. The restaurants served German cuisine.

The rights were purchased in early 2022 by William Belida, owner of The Salon Group in NYC, and are in the process of re-launching with an updated menu and brand focus.

== History ==
Joe Baum, the president of Restaurant Associates, opened the first branch of Zum Zum in the Pan Am Building in concert with the opening of the 1964 World's Fair. The restaurants were unique in offering only counter seating. The menu included a variety of German wurst and freshly smoked meats.

In Germany, many restaurant signs begin with "Zum", which means To The.

The Zum Zum logo featured a sausage in the shape of the letter "U". It was designed by George Lois and Kurt Weihs in 1963.

== Criticism ==
New York Times restaurant critic Craig Claiborne wrote about the food: "The Zum Zum's sausages, whether bauernwurst or a frankfurter, are well seasoned and with good texture. The sausage salad, on the other hand, is an interesting idea but disappointing in preparation. Like the restaurant's potato salad, it seems vitally lacking in ingredients that would elevate its character, chopped onion, for example, chopped pickle and more herbs such as parsley. It is too bland for one palate."

When Zum Zum opened a restaurant in Harvard Square in Cambridge, Massachusetts, in 1969, The Harvard Crimson's restaurant critic, Esther Dyson, described its fare as follows: "Unless you like German food—about five different kinds of wursts—it's best to stick to the frankfurter with sauerkraut, a big juicy hot dog for 35 cents. The desserts, doughnuts, fruit salad, and apple crumbles, are also cheap and good. What Zum Zum does best is breakfast, the standard fare plus apple pancakes, although you have to eat it off pewter plates. A nice filling breakfast with assorted German jams and maple syrup will cost you just a dollar." Dyson also noted that the restaurant did not supply ketchup, "being strictly German", but instead had "china pots of mustard cutely labeled 'Das Sweet' and 'Das Hot'".

== In popular culture ==
Zum Zum was mentioned in the 1974 Jobriath song "Scumbag", which, in turn, inspired a reference to "Zom Zom's" in the Gary Numan song "Down in the Park".

Zum Zum is referenced in the 2005 memoir The Glass Castle, by Jeannette Walls. It is revealed that her older sister, Lori, worked there as a server.
