= Cloud 9 (Jamiroquai song) =

2017 single by Jamiroquai

Single by Jamiroquai

from the album Automaton
- Released: 10 February 2017
- Genre: Nu-disco; funk
- Length: 3:56
- Label: Virgin EMI
- Songwriters: Matt Johnson; Jay Kay
- Producers: Matt Johnson; Jay Kay

Jamiroquai singles chronology
"Automaton" (2017)	"Cloud 9" (2017)	"Superfresh" (2017)

Music video
- "Cloud 9" on YouTube

"Cloud 9" is a song by English funk band Jamiroquai. It was released as the second single from their eighth studio album, Automaton, on 10 February 2017. The song peaked at number 19 in France, number 35 in Spain, and number 77 in Scotland.

== Music video ==
The music video for "Cloud 9" was released on 22 February 2017. Directed by Charlie Lightening, director of the music video for the band's previous single "Automaton", the video was shot in Almeria, Spain, and stars band frontman Jay Kay alongside Mónica Cruz. Some of the scenes throughout the video have been noted as being similar to the work of Quentin Tarantino, and there are references to the music video for a past song by the band, "Cosmic Girl". The video was filmed at the Cabo de Gata, in Spain.

== Track listing ==
No.	Title	Length
1.	"Cloud 9"	3:56
2.	"Cloud 9 (Radio Edit)"	3:24
3.	"Cloud 9 (Purple Disco Machine Remix)"	6:42
4.	"Cloud 9 (Fred Falke Remix)"	3:37
5.	"Cloud 9 (Fred Falke Extended Remix)"	6:05
6.	"Cloud 9 (Tough Love Remix)"	3:55
7.	"Cloud 9 (Tough Love Extended Remix)"	5:40
8.	"Cloud 9 (Tough Love 'Don't Be A Fool' Dub)"	5:55

== Charts ==
Chart performance for "Cloud 9"
Chart (2017)	Peak position
Belgium (Ultratip Bubbling Under Flanders)	9
Belgium (Ultratip Bubbling Under Wallonia)	12
France (SNEP)	157
Japan Hot 100 (Billboard)	55
Scotland Singles (Official Charts)	77
Spain (Promusicae)	35
Switzerland (Schweizer Hitparade)	80
US Hot Dance/Electronic Songs (Billboard)	46
