= Jobriath A.D. =

- DVD cover
- Directed by: Kieran Turner
- Written by: Kieran Turner
- Based on: Jobriath
- Produced by: Kieran Turner
- Starring: Jobriath Boone; Jerry Brandt; Joe Elliott; Marc Almond; Dennis Christopher; Will Sheff
- Narrated by: Henry Rollins
- Cinematography: Michael Canzoniero; P.J. Gaynard
- Edited by: Danny Bresnik
- Music by: Ian Moore; Jason Staczek
- Production companies: Eight Track; Tape Productions
- Distributed by: Factory 25
- Release date: March 29, 2012
- Running time: 102 minutes
- Country: United States
- Language: English

Jobriath A.D. is a 2012 American biographical documentary film written, produced and directed by Kieran Turner. The documentary details the rise and fall of Jobriath, the first openly gay rock star signed to a major record label. The film features commentary by Jerry Brandt, Joe Elliott, Marc Almond, Dennis Christopher, Will Sheff, Justin Tranter, Kristian Hoffman, and Ann Magnuson, and is narrated by Henry Rollins. Jobriath appears in archival footage. The film had its world premiere on March 29, 2012 at the London Gay & Lesbian Film Festival, and had additional screenings at the Frameline Film Festival, and the Florida Film Festival. It won the Best Documentary award at both the Out on Film festival and the Dublin Gay & Lesbian Film Festival. The film had a limited theatrical release on January 31, 2014, and was released to DVD in 2015.

== Synopsis ==
The film tells the story of Jobriath, known as the first openly gay rock star. It begins when Jobriath was a member of the Los Angeles cast of Hair, where he played the role of Woof. The documentary then moves to New York where Jobriath has re-located and highlights his time with a band called Pidgeon, which quickly disbanded after one album. He then meets talent manager and promoter Jerry Brandt. After hearing some of his music, Brandt becomes his manager and gets him a record deal, reportedly worth $500,000 with Elektra Records. Brandt then starts a massive publicity campaign promoting Jobriath, in New York City and abroad in London and Paris, before anyone had even heard any of his music. Meanwhile, in interviews with the media, Jobriath is introducing himself to the world as "the true fairy of rock 'n' roll". After the release of two albums, his career never takes off, the gay community has shunned him for being too flamboyant and in your face gay, and music critics have basically dismissed him. He leaves the music business and returns to his mother's house for a brief period before moving back to New York where he re-invents himself as Cole Berlin, a cabaret act, performing gigs at piano bars. Shortly thereafter, he dies from AIDS in 1983.

Henry Rollins narrates the film, and it features the following artists, who said that Jobriath influenced them: Marc Almond (Soft Cell), Joey Arias (performance artist), Jayne County (Wayne County & the Electric Chairs, Joe Elliott (Def Leppard (Note: Def Leppard covered Jobriath's song "Heartbeat" for their 2006 covers album, Yeah!)), Stephin Merritt (The Magnetic Fields), Jake Shears (Scissor Sisters), Will Sheff (Okkervil River) and Justin Tranter (Semi Precious Weapons).

== Cast ==
Appearing as themselves

- Jerry Brandt
- Jayne County
- Dennis Christopher
- Joe Elliott
- Kristian Hoffman
- Gloria Jones
- Ann Magnuson
- Miss Mercy
- Jake Shears
- Will Sheff
- Justin Tranter
- Marc Almond
- Joey Arias
- Michael Butler
- Lisa Fancher
- Jim Fouratt
- Sarah Kernochan
- Eddie Kramer
- Heather MacRae
- Stephin Merritt

Appearing in archival footage

- Jobriath Boone
- Richard Gere
- Vicki Sue Robinson

== Production notes ==
Kieran Turner told the Gay Times he had no intentions on making a documentary and stumbled upon Jobriath's music unintentionally through an online ad recommendation while buying something else. The recommendation turned out to be the 2004 CD compilation of Jobriath's music titled Lonely Planet Boy, which was produced and re-mastered by Morrissey, and released by Attack Records. Turner admitted he was pleasantly surprised at Jobriath's vast talent and originality, and decided to pursue a project to find out why he failed. Morrissey refused on several occasions to take part in the documentary.

In an interview with L.A. Record, Turner said most of the people he interviewed for the documentary thought Jerry Brandt was the reason Jobriath flopped in such a big way. Turner said that line of thought was a little unfair, because Jobriath was a grown up who could make his own decisions in relation to business decisions. He told Atlanta Magazine that Brandt had the "right idea but he just executed it incorrectly". Turner went on to say there were many factors to take into consideration, and to blame Brandt alone for it would be too simplistic. However, Turner did note that Brandt had his own version of what happened, and no one knows how close that is to the truth.

Turner also offered his own opinion about why Jobriath’s career never took off: "I don't think that music was ever going to be a hit anywhere". He elaborated further by saying it was a trifecta of events that hurt his chances of ever being successful, the first being that there was a lack of critical acclaim for his music, the second being Brandt, who over-hyped him with giant billboards, hundreds of advertisements on New York City transit buses, and full page ads in magazines, before he even had a concert or released any albums. Turner said the third thing was his open homosexuality, because it was "completely turning people off...people were just not ready to accept that in 1973". Turner closed by saying Jobriath probably could have overcome any single one of those things, but when you "put all three of those things together—forget it".

At the end of the film, Turner included a short animation that illustrated what was supposed to be the singer's live debut at the Paris Opera. The concept, estimated to cost $200,000, showed a miniature Empire State Building rising up from the stage floor, and Jobriath emerging from the base of the building dressed as King Kong and climbing up the building. When he reached the top, it would then turn into a giant ejaculating penis spraying glitter all over the audience, and finally he would transform and appear on the stage as Marlene Dietrich.

== Reviews ==
Josh Modell wrote in his review for The A.V. Club that the film is a "tragic and occasionally fascinating look at pop stardom in the late 1970s and early 1980s, but its subject seems just barely compelling enough to sustain it". David Gold of The New York Times said the film comes across as "mockumentary material", and since there are scant recordings of Jobriath, it "lacks a sense of him or his music". He criticized Jerry Brandt, for his "stupefyingly dumb marketing while evading responsibility". Andrew Pulver of The Guardian said the film is "one not to be missed", and the singer's story "emerges as one of rock'n'roll's great tragedies, a tale of hubris, misery and death". He rated the film. Dennis Harvey praised the film in Variety as an "absorbing and deftly crafted documentary [that] compels interest throughout". However, he did suggest the film could have used a "less partisan evaluation of his musicianship", by inviting some of Jobriath's past critics "who once trashed him" to re-evaluate his music now.

The Hollywood Reporter wrote that "viewers will surely have their curiosity piqued, but may not walk out convinced of Jobriath's place in the pop pantheon". Diego Semerene of Slant Magazine rated it 2 out of 4 stars. He said the film is "maddeningly straight-forward, traditional, and televisual...and never explores the depths and nuances that could actually place Jobriath in conversation with figures who came after him, however reductively". Inkoo Kang from The Village Voice thought "Turner is interested in securing a place in the pantheon of queer heroes for rock’s self-proclaimed true fairy..." and the film is a "reminder of how much we still need imaginative pioneers like him today".

== Accolades ==
- Dublin Gay & Lesbian Film Festival (Winner Best Documentary, Jury Award)
- Out on Film (Winner Best Documentary, Jury Award)
- Seattle Queer Film Festival (Honorable mention, Best Documentary, Jury Award)
- Florida Film Festival (Nominated Best Documentary, Jury Award)

== See also ==
- Cabaret
- Glam rock
