= Charlie Lightening =

British filmmaker

Charlie Lightening is a British filmmaker. After making videos for various British artists, Lightening began a working relationship with Liam Gallagher, directing several music videos for him and a documentary film, Liam Gallagher: As It Was. In 2023, he directed All of Those Voices, a documentary about English singer Louis Tomlinson. His first non-documentary feature-length film directed was Standing on the Shoulders of Kitties in 2024.

== Career ==
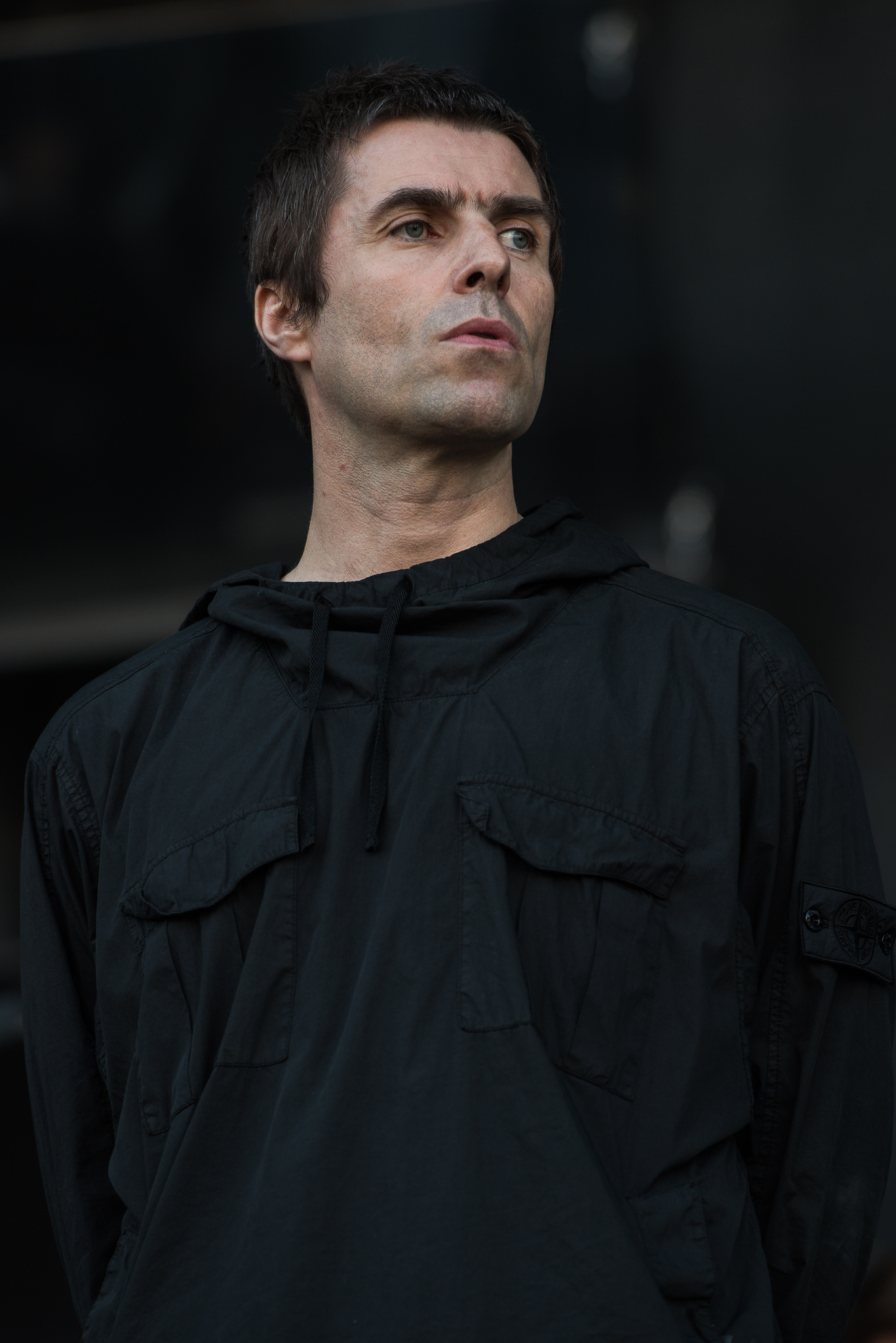
Lightening has worked with English singer Liam Gallagher (pictured) for over ten years.

Lightening is a filmmaker. He first worked with English musician Ronnie Wood, then did work with Kylie Minogue. After being asked to record a party on a farm by band Kasabian, Lightening began working for the band. He first met English singers Noel and Liam Gallagher whilst Kasabian was an opener for their band Oasis on tour in the United States. As Lightening was making a film about Kasabian's second album, Noel and Liam came up to the studio to listen to it.

Lightening has worked with Liam Gallagher since the release of Dig Out Your Soul, which was his former band Oasis' final album. Shortly after the band's split in 2009, Lightening began to record Gallagher, filming material that would eventually be used in his 2019 documentary film Liam Gallagher: As It Was. Lightening had planned to make a feature-length documentary about Gallagher's transition into solo music, eventually directing As It Was. He received the award for Best Music Film at the NME Awards 2020.

In 2023, he directed All of Those Voices, a documentary about English singer Louis Tomlinson. He met Tomlinson at the premiere for As It Was, after which Tomlinson got in touch with Lightening to direct music videos for him. In 2024, he directed musical comedy film Standing on the Shoulders of Kitties, a spinoff of Trailer Park Boys.

== Filmography ==
=== Film ===
| Year | Title | Ref. |
|---|---|---|
| 2019 | Liam Gallagher: As It Was | |
| 2021 | Away from Home - The Global Streaming Event | |
| 2023 | All of Those Voices | |
| 2024 | Standing on the Shoulders of Kitties | |

=== Music videos ===
| Year | Title | Artist | Ref. |
|---|---|---|---|
| 2010 | Bring the Light | Beady Eye | |
| 2013 | Shine a Light | Beady Eye | |
| 2013 | Soul Love | Beady Eye | |
| 2013 | 13 | Black Sabbath | |
| 2014 | No Good in Goodbye | The Script | |
| 2017 | Chinatown | Liam Gallagher | |
| 2017 | Automaton | Jamiroquai | |
| 2017 | Cloud 9 | Jamiroquai | |
| 2017 | Superfresh | Jamiroquai | |
| 2017 | Summer Girl | Jamiroquai | |
| 2018 | Nights out in the Jungle | Jamiroquai | |
| 2018 | Back in Brazil | Paul McCartney | |
| 2019 | Kill My Mind | Louis Tomlinson | |
| 2019 | We Made It | Louis Tomlinson | |
| 2019 | Don't Let It Break Your Heart | Louis Tomlinson | |
| 2020 | Walls | Louis Tomlinson | |
| 2020 | Once | Liam Gallagher | |
| 2020 | From the Rivoli Ballroom | Katie Melua | |
| 2021 | 1 Day 2 Nights | HRVY | |
| 2022 | Change | Louis Tomlinson | |
| 2025 | Rocket | Robbie Williams | |

== Awards and nominations ==
Awards and nominations received by Charlie Lightening
| Award | Year | Category | Nominated work | Result | Ref. |
|---|---|---|---|---|---|
| NME Awards | 2020 | Best Music Film | Liam Gallagher: As It Was | Won | |
| National Film Awards UK | 2021 | Best Documentary | Liam Gallagher: As It Was | Won | |
