= White Knuckle Ride =

2009 single by Jamiroquai

Single by Jamiroquai

from the album Rock Dust Light Star
- Released: 31 October 2010
- Recorded: 2005–2007
- Studio: Jam (London)
- Genre: Funk; electro-disco; nu disco; dance-pop
- Length: 3:35 (album version); 3:26 (radio edit)
- Label: Mercury
- Songwriters: Matt Johnson; Jay Kay
- Producer: Jay Kay

Jamiroquai singles chronology
"Runaway" (2006)	"White Knuckle Ride" (2010)	"Blue Skies" (2010)

Music video
- "White Knuckle Ride" on YouTube

"White Knuckle Ride" is the first single from British funk/acid jazz group Jamiroquai's studio album Rock Dust Light Star. The single was released via Digital Download on 31 October 2010, with a Limited Edition Vinyl release due to appear on 1 January 2011. The song was written by band frontman Jay Kay and Matt Johnson and produced by Kay. It is the band's first record to be released under Mercury Records.

The band's official website originally announced that the single would be released on 11 October. The band describe "White Knuckle Ride" as "a hi-octane retrospective on Jay's career experiences – a cautionary tale equally applicable to anyone's life in these pressure cooker times." It appears that the Jamiroquai logo typeface has been stretched vertically for this release. The video for the single was made available on the group's YouTube account on 25 September. The single charted at No.39 in the UK Singles Chart and as of 2025, remains their last UK Top 40 hit. It also chatted at number 7 on the U.S. Billboard Hot Dance Club Songs chart.

== Music video ==
The music video shows Jay Kay piloting a helicopter in pursuit of a Porsche 911 Carrera RS 2.7 along a winding desert road. After several unsuccessful attempts at losing the helicopter – including driving in wide circuits to raise a cloud of dust to blind Kay, and taking a detour down a tree-lined dirt road – the driver comes to a halt under a viaduct and escapes on foot. Kay arrives to find the car abandoned with no sign of the driver, whose face is never shown. The helicopter is a Robinson R44 Raven 2 owned by Jay Kay, who is a qualified private helicopter pilot, however a stunt pilot was used for some scenes.

The video was filmed on the Tabernas Desert, in Almeria, Spain and was directed by Howard Greenhalgh.

== Track listing ==
Digital Download

1. "White Knuckle Ride" – 3:35

== Remixes ==
Seamus Haji Mixes

- "White Knuckle Ride (Seamus Haji Remix)" – 6:40
- "White Knuckle Ride (Seamus Haji Dub)" – 6:40
- "White Knuckle Ride (Seamus Haji Radio Edit)" – 3:00

Alan Braxe Mixes

- "White Knuckle Ride (Alan Braxe Remix)" – 6:16
- "White Knuckle Ride (Alan Braxe Radio Edit)" – 3:16

Penguin Prison Mixes

- "White Knuckle Ride (Penguin Prison Remix)" – 5:37
- "White Knuckle Ride (Penguin Prison Dub)" – 5:30

Monarchy Mixes

- "White Knuckle Ride (Monarchy Remix)" – 7:00
- "White Knuckle Ride (Monarchy Dub)" – 6:45

== Live performances ==
- The X Factor UK – 31 October 2010: Week 3 Results Show (Alongside Rihanna and Bon Jovi)
- The X Factor Australia – 13 December 2010: The Final

== Charts ==
=== Weekly charts ===
Chart (2010–2012)	Peak position
Australia (ARIA)	96
Austria (Ö3 Austria Top 40)	37
Belgium (Ultratop 50 Flanders)	41
Belgium (Ultratop 50 Wallonia)	34
France (SNEP) Download Chart	24
Finland (Suomen virallinen lista)	16
Germany (GfK)	49
Italy (FIMI)	1
Italy Airplay (EarOne)	1
Japan Hot 100 (Billboard)	11
Netherlands (Dutch Top 40)	25
Netherlands (Single Top 100)	15
Scottish Singles Sales (Official Charts)	43
Switzerland (Schweizer Hitparade)	20
UK Singles (Official Charts)	39
US Hot Dance Club Songs (Billboard)	7

=== Year-end charts ===
Chart (2010)	Peak position
Italy (FIMI)	65
Italy Airplay (EarOne)	55
Japan Adult Contemporary (Billboard Japan)	19
Japan Digital Tracks (RIAJ)	76

== Certifications ==
Region	Certification	Certified units/sales
Italy (FIMI)	Gold	15,000^{*}
^{*} Sales figures based on certification alone.
