= As It Was (disambiguation) =

"As It Was" is a 2022 song by English singer Harry Styles.

As It Was may also refer to:

- Liam Gallagher: As It Was, a 2019 documentary film about English singer Liam Gallagher
- "As It Was", a 2019 song by Irish musician Hozier from their album Wasteland, Baby!
