= Sarah McLellan =

Australian actor and singer

- Born: Sarah Elizabeth McLellan; 22 November 1982 (age 43); Bundaberg, Queensland, Australia
- Occupations: Presenter, writer, blogger
- Instrument: Vocals
- Website: http://theaussiewhoatethebigapple.tumblr.com/

Sarah Elizabeth McLellan (born 22 November 1982) is an Australian dancer, singer and actress.

== Early life ==
McLellan was born at Bundaberg, Queensland, Australia, and was raised by her single mother, Dianne.

== Career ==
Having danced in the United States at Disneyland and in international competitions earlier in her teenage years, she moved to New York City at age 17 and made her Broadway debut in the musical "42nd Street" at age 20. She then moved to Las Vegas to perform in the original U.S. company of the Queen and Ben Elton hit musical " We Will Rock You" where she played a Teen Queen and understudied and performed the role of Killer Queen.

From October 2005 to January 2009, Sarah performed as the lead singer of the critically acclaimed all female rock tribute Lez Zeppelin. The band toured all over the US, Europe, and Japan and performed for crowds of up to 40,000 at major festivals including headlining the opening night of Tennessee's Bonnaroo Music Festival in 2008. With McLellan as lead singer, the band also recorded and released their debut album in July 2007.

The album was recorded with producer/engineer Eddie Kramer, best known for his work with Led Zeppelin, Jimi Hendrix, and KISS; and was mastered by George Marino, who digitally remastered all of the original Led Zeppelin recordings with Jimmy Page. The album, released on Emanation Records, is available in the US in stores and online. In Japan the album was released by Avex and charted in the top 100.

== Subsequent work ==
Upon leaving Lez Zeppelin, McLellan worked in restaurants, working her way up to director of marketing, social, and events for a restaurant group. She also worked as an agency strategist, and as a content editor, including for Condé Nast's Bon Appétit magazine, before by 2023 going on to run a digital media consulting business for small brands in travel and food.

In 2010, McLellan started working as a freelance television and web host / presenter. She filmed a TV travel show pilot in Istanbul in September 2010 with Azertion Productions and has also filmed for Pixels and Pills as a conference host. She writes her own food blog "The Aussie Who Ate the Big Apple" and is filming video content for a TV show pilot of the same name.

Sarah McLellan is represented by Avalon Artists Group in Los Angeles and New York City.

== Personal life ==
In 2019, McLellan married Chaz Mee, "a born-and-raised New Yorker". They have a daughter and live in Greenpoint, Brooklyn.
