= All of Those Voices =

2023 documentary film

- Poster
- Directed by: Charlie Lightening
- Produced by: Amy James; Charles Lightening; Louis Tomlinson; Matt Vines
- Cinematography: Calvin Aurand; Daniel Lightening
- Edited by: Pablo D'Ambrosi
- Production companies: 78 Productions; Trafalgar Releasing
- Distributed by: Trafalgar Releasing
- Release dates: 13 March 2023 (Tokyo premiere); 22 March 2023 (Cinemas); 8 December 2023 (DVD)

All of Those Voices is a 2023 British documentary film directed by Charlie Lightening which details English singer-songwriter Louis Tomlinson's personal journey of transitioning from a member of One Direction to a solo musician.

== Synopsis ==
The film is narrated by Tomlinson himself and paired with archival footage from the past. It also includes interviews with his family members. The film primarily covers the timeframe between the indefinite hiatus of One Direction and the completion of Louis Tomlinson World Tour and second album Faith in the Future.

== Release and promotion ==
The launching of the documentary was first announced on 8 February 2023. The film was released to selective cinemas worldwide on 22 March, prior to which there were three premiere events: 13 March in Tokyo, 16 March in London, and 20 March in Mexico. The London premiere was notably attended by fellow One Direction member Liam Payne.

On 13 May 2023, the film was streamed globally on Veeps.com. The streaming, announced on 27 April, featured unreleased footage and the live coverage of the red carpet event from the John Anson Ford Amphitheatre.

All of Those Voices will be available to stream on Paramount+ from 4 October 2023 in the United States and Canada, and from 5 October in the United Kingdom, Ireland, Australia, Latin America, Italy, France, Germany, Switzerland, Austria and South Korea. It will also be released through MTV in Africa, other parts of Europe, Japan, and New Zealand.

== Reception ==
=== Box office ===
As of 14 July 2023, the film had grossed $1,858.888.

=== Critical reception ===
The film received mostly positive reviews from critics.

=== Charts ===
The re-issue is a part of the DVD/CD (BMG) release of the DVD All of Those Voices documentary + CD Faith in the Future. "Back To You (Studio Version)" is exclusive to this version of the album.

Chart (2023)	Peak position	Ref.
Dutch Charts	60	
Belgium Ultratop Flanders	15	
Belgium Ultratop Wallonia	70	
Italy FIMI	59	
US Top Current Albums Sales (Billboard)	46	
