= Rock Dust Light Star =

Studio album by Jamiroquai
- Released: 1 November 2010
- Recorded: 2009–2010
- Studio: Chillington Studios, Buckinghamshire Hook End Manor, Oxfordshire Karma Studios, Thailand
- Genres: Funk; rock; R&B; soul
- Length: 52:06
- Labels: Universal; Mercury (UK); Executive; Fontana (US)
- Producers: Charlie Russell and Brad Spence

Jamiroquai chronology
Multiquai (2006)	Rock Dust Light Star (2010)	Automaton (2017)

Jamiroquai studio album chronology
Dynamite (2005)	Rock Dust Light Star (2010)	Automaton (2017)

Singles from Rock Dust Light Star
- 1. "White Knuckle Ride" Released: 31 October 2010; 2. "Blue Skies" Released: 1 November 2010; 3. "Lifeline" Released: 24 January 2011

Rock Dust Light Star is the seventh studio album by English band Jamiroquai. It was released on 1 November 2010 in the United Kingdom by Universal Music/Mercury Records and on 24 April 2012 in the United States by Executive Music Group.

== Background ==
The album was recorded at Jamiroquai frontman Jay Kay's home studio in Buckinghamshire, as well as Hook End Manor in Oxfordshire, and Karma Studios in Thailand. The album was written entirely by the band, and produced by first time collaborators Charlie Russell and Brad Spence. The band revealed that the musical style of the new album would be more centred on funk and rock; however, Kay claimed that the tone and style of the album were hard for him to describe. Promotion of the album began in October 2010, with a press conference involving Kay and fellow band members Derrick McKenzie, Sola Akingbola, Matt Johnson, Paul Turner, and Rob Harris. They announced that the group were to play two concerts, in Colombia and Brazil, to promote the album, before discussing plans for a possible world tour in 2011. In a review for The Daily Telegraph, the album was described as "blistering, poetic, meaty, reflective and inspiring". For this album, Kay took inspiration from Rod Stewart, Roxy Music, Pink Floyd and the Rolling Stones "in their more rock/disco phase".

== Reception ==
Professional ratings
Review scores
Source	Rating
AllMusic	4/5 stars
Consequence of Sound	4/5 stars
The Daily Telegraph	4/5 stars
Evening Standard	3/5 stars
The Guardian	2/5 stars
PopMatters	7/10
musicOMH	3.5/5 stars
Slant Magazine	3.5/5 stars
Sputnikmusic	4/5
The Times	3/5 stars

Upon release, the album debuted at number seven on the UK Albums Chart with sales of about 34,378 copies. As of December 2010, the album has sold 210,000 copies worldwide. On 17 December 2010, the album was certified Gold in the UK for reaching sales of 100,000 copies. In March 2011, Jamiroquai announced plans for the speculated worldwide tour, starting with dates at Hallenstadion in Zürich on 18 March 2011, and ending with two shows at the SECC in Glasgow on 20 April 2011. And in June 2011, another string of tour dates were confirmed on the band's website for June and July.

== Track listing ==
No.	Title	Writer(s)	Length
1.	"Rock Dust Light Star"	Jay Kay, Rob Harris, Matt Johnson	4:39
2.	"White Knuckle Ride"	Kay, Johnson	3:33
3.	"Smoke and Mirrors"	Kay, Johnson, Harris	4:30
4.	"All Good in the Hood"	Kay, Paul Turner, Harris	3:35
5.	"Hurtin'"	Kay, Harris	4:15
6.	"Blue Skies"	Kay, Johnson	3:51
7.	"Lifeline"	Kay, Johnson, Harris	4:39
8.	"She's a Fast Persuader"	Derrick McKenzie, Kay, Johnson, Turner, Harris, Sola Akingbola	5:16
9.	"Two Completely Different Things"	Kay, Harris	4:25
10.	"Goodbye to My Dancer"	Kay, Johnson, Harris	4:06
11.	"Never Gonna Be Another"	Kay, Johnson	4:08
12.	"Hey Floyd"	McKenzie, Kay, Johnson, Turner, Akingbola	5:09
Total length:			52:06

Japanese bonus track
No.	Title	Writer(s)	Length
13.	"That's Not the Funk"	Kay, Harris	3:22
Total length:			55:28

Deluxe Edition bonus tracks
No.	Title	Writer(s)	Length
13.	"All Good in the Hood" (acoustic version)		3:39
14.	"Angeline"	McKenzie, Kay, Harris	3:29
15.	"Hang It Over"	Kay, Harris	4:50
16.	"Rock Dust Light Star" (Live at Paleo)		5:42
17.	"White Knuckle Ride" (Alan Braxe remix)		3:17
18.	"Blue Skies" (Fred Falke remix)		4:08
Total length:			77:12

== Outtakes ==
Although a total of 40 songs were recorded for the album, the studio only requested and wanted 15 tracks of those track to appear across all editions of the album. A video for the album, posted just before release, showed recording of the tracks "I've Been Working" and "Super Highway"; however, neither of those tracks appeared on the final track listing. "All Mixed Up in You" appeared to be the original and working title for "Angeline", which was released as a bonus track in the deluxe version of the album. Upon the album being made available to pre-order, several retail websites listed the standard album containing thirteen tracks, with track No. 8 called "Your Window Is a Crazy Television". However, upon the album appearing in stores, the track was nowhere to be seen.

On 2 June 2011, a competition began to design artwork for a brand-new Jamiroquai single, "Smile", an outtake from Rock Dust Light Star. On 9 June, the winner of the competition was announced, and the song was initially made available for free download via SoundCloud and was later published for free download on music journalism sites such as Earmilk. On 6 January 2018, Kay announced that he would be releasing a couple of the outtake tracks once every month as a new year's gift. On 16 January 2018, "Now We Are Alone" was released to the public in streaming format, but other the tracks were never released as stated.

During the Heels of Steel Tour in late 2025, VIP ticket holders were given a vinyl single pressing of the now-titled "Your Window It's A Crazy Television", with the song on side A, and the instrumental on side B. Although it has not yet been released widely, recordings of the vinyl circulate online.

== Personnel ==
Adapted from the Jamiroquai Universal website.

- Malcolm Strachan – trumpet, flugelhorn
- Jim Corry – saxophone
- James Russell – saxophone, flute
- Matt Johnson – keyboards
- Rob Harris – guitar
- Paul Turner – bass guitar
- Simon Hale – strings
- Derrick McKenzie – drums
- Sola Akingbola – percussion
- Jay Kay – vocals
- Valerie Etienne – background vocals
- Hazel Fernandez – background vocals
- Kate Sutherland – background vocals on 'Rock Dust Light Star' Live Version

== Charts ==
=== Weekly charts ===
Chart (2010)	Peak position
Australian Albums (ARIA)	13
Austrian Albums (Ö3 Austria)	6
Belgian Albums (Ultratop Flanders)	19
Belgian Albums (Ultratop Wallonia)	10
Danish Albums (Hitlisten)	18
Dutch Albums (Album Top 100)	1
Finnish Albums (Suomen virallinen lista)	22
French Albums (SNEP)	2
German Albums (Offizielle Top 100)	7
Greek Albums (IFPI Greece)	34
Irish Albums (IRMA)	29
Italian Albums (FIMI)	3
Japanese Albums (Oricon)	7
Mexican Albums (AMPROFON)	26
Polish Albums (OLiS)	15
Portuguese Albums (AFP)	23
Scottish Albums (Official Charts)	10
Spanish Albums (Promusicae)	9
Swedish Albums (Sverigetopplistan)	23
Swiss Albums (Schweizer Hitparade)	2
UK Albums (Official Charts)	7
US Top Dance Albums (Billboard)	17

=== Year-end charts ===
Chart (2010)	Position
Dutch Albums (Album Top 100)	85
French Albums (SNEP)	50
Italian Albums (FIMI)	62
Swiss Albums (Schweizer Hitparade)	66
UK Albums (OCC)	166

== Certifications ==
Region	Certification	Certified units/sales
Italy (FIMI)	Platinum	60,000^{*}
Poland (ZPAV)	Gold	10,000^{*}
Switzerland (IFPI Switzerland)	Gold	15,000^{^}
United Kingdom (BPI)	Gold	100,000^{^}
^{*} Sales figures based on certification alone.^{^} Shipments figures based on certification alone.
