= Shannon Conley =

American voice actress

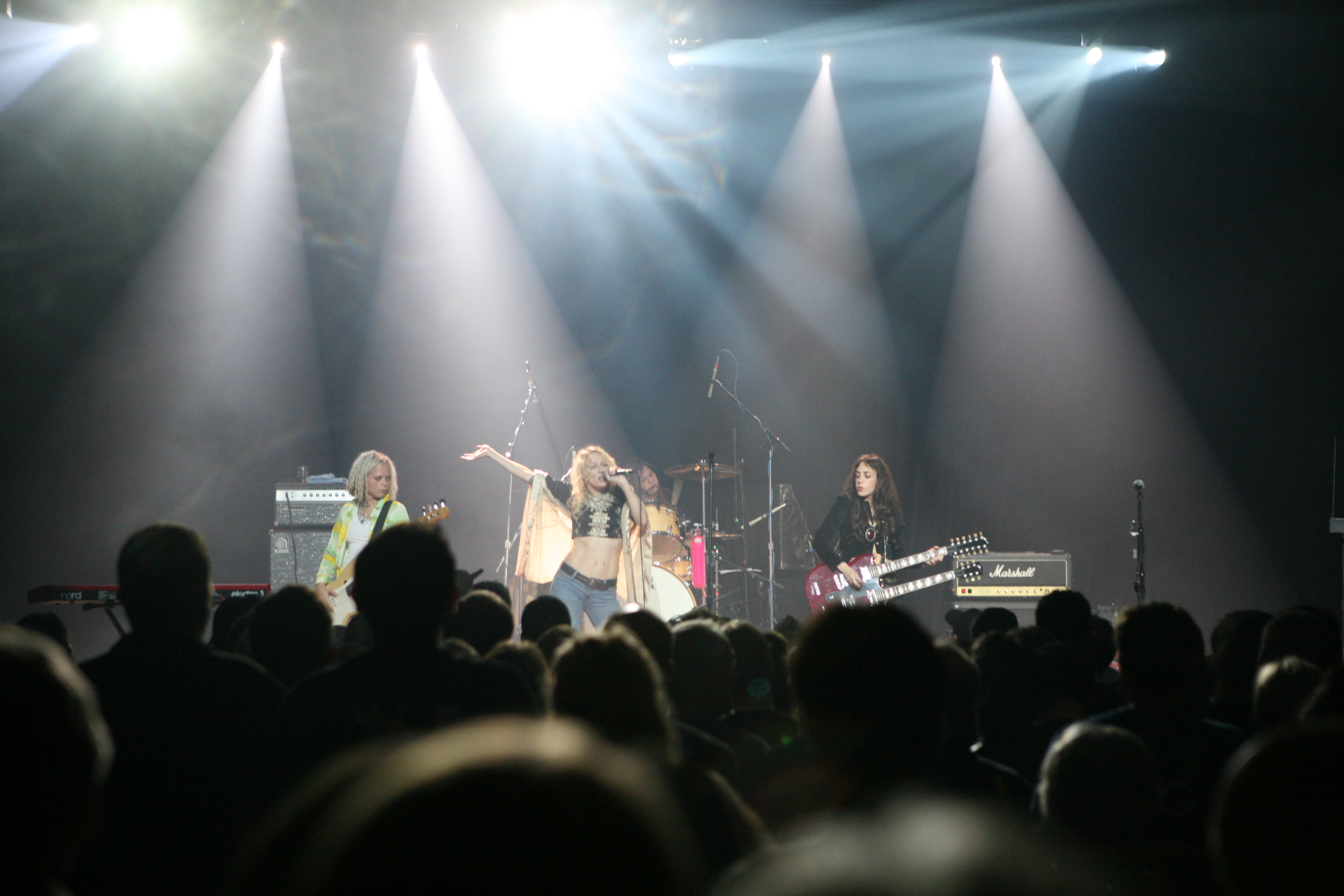
- Shannon (center) performing with Lez Zeppelin
- Born: Shannon Elizabeth Conley; December 31, 1970 (age 55); Norfolk, Virginia, United States
- Other names: Holly Bobbit; Ursula Conlon; Sonny Dey; Vibe Jones; Candi Washington; Deborah Zane
- Occupations: Voice actress; musician
- Website: shannonconley.com

Shannon Conley (also credited as Sonny Dey, Holly Bobbit, Ursula Conlon, Vibe Jones, Candi Washington and Deborah Zane) is an American voice actress and musician based in New York City. She has done voice work in English dubs of Japanese anime for Central Park Media and NYAV Post. She is also the former lead vocalist for the all-female tribute band, Lez Zeppelin. She made her Broadway debut in Hedwig and the Angry Inch as the understudy for the role of Yitzhak.

== Filmography ==
=== Anime ===
- Ah! My Goddess – Urd
- Area 88: Act II - Requirements of Wolves – Taeko Yasuda
- Arcade Gamer Fubuki – Melody Honey (credited as Vibe Jones)
- Garaga – Paula
- Grave of the Fireflies - Additional Voices
- Legend of the Dragon Kings – Patricia Landsdale / Lady L (credited as Vibe Jones)
- Magic User's Club! OVA – Saki Sawanoguchi
- Pokémon: Diamond & Pearl – Pokémon Hunter J
- Queen's Blade Rebellion – Annelotte, Dark Annelotte
- Time Bokan: Royal Revival – Dorojo, Yanyan, Atasha, Munmun, Mirenjo, Majo, Mujo (credited as Vibe Jones)

=== Live action dubbing ===
- Cutie Honey (film) – Gold Claw

=== Non-anime roles ===
- As Told By Ginger – The Little Seal Girl
- Astonishing X-Men: The Motion Comic – Abigail Brand
- Ellen's Acres – Connie
- Kappa Mikey – Orie
- Kikoriki: Legend of the Golden Dragon – Lara, Natives
- Newbie and the Disasternauts – Newbie
- Ratatoing – Powlo the Cat
- Thumb Wrestling Federation – The Cheetah, Queen Nefercreppy (credited as Vibe Jones)
