= Lez Zeppelin =

All-female Led Zeppelin tribute band

- Origin: New York City, New York, U.S.
- Genres: Hard rock; heavy metal; tribute band
- Years active: 2004–present
- Labels: Pie, Emanation
- Members: Steph Paynes; Hilary Blaze; Dana Athens; Joan Chew
- Past members: Brooke Gengras; Wendy Kidd; Lisa Brigantino; Helen Destroy; Sarah McLellan; Kris Bradley; Jessica Fagre; Shannon Conley; Megan Thomas; Leesa Squyres; Marlain Angelides
- Website: lezzeppelin.com

Lez Zeppelin is an all-female tribute act, performing the work of Led Zeppelin.

== History ==
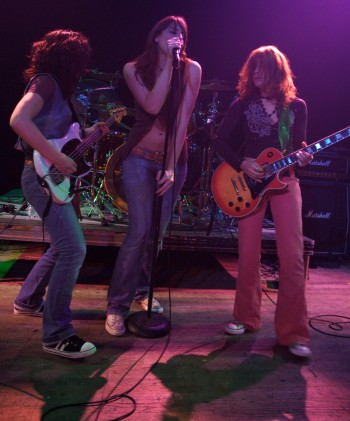
Lez Zeppelin performing in Indianapolis in 2006

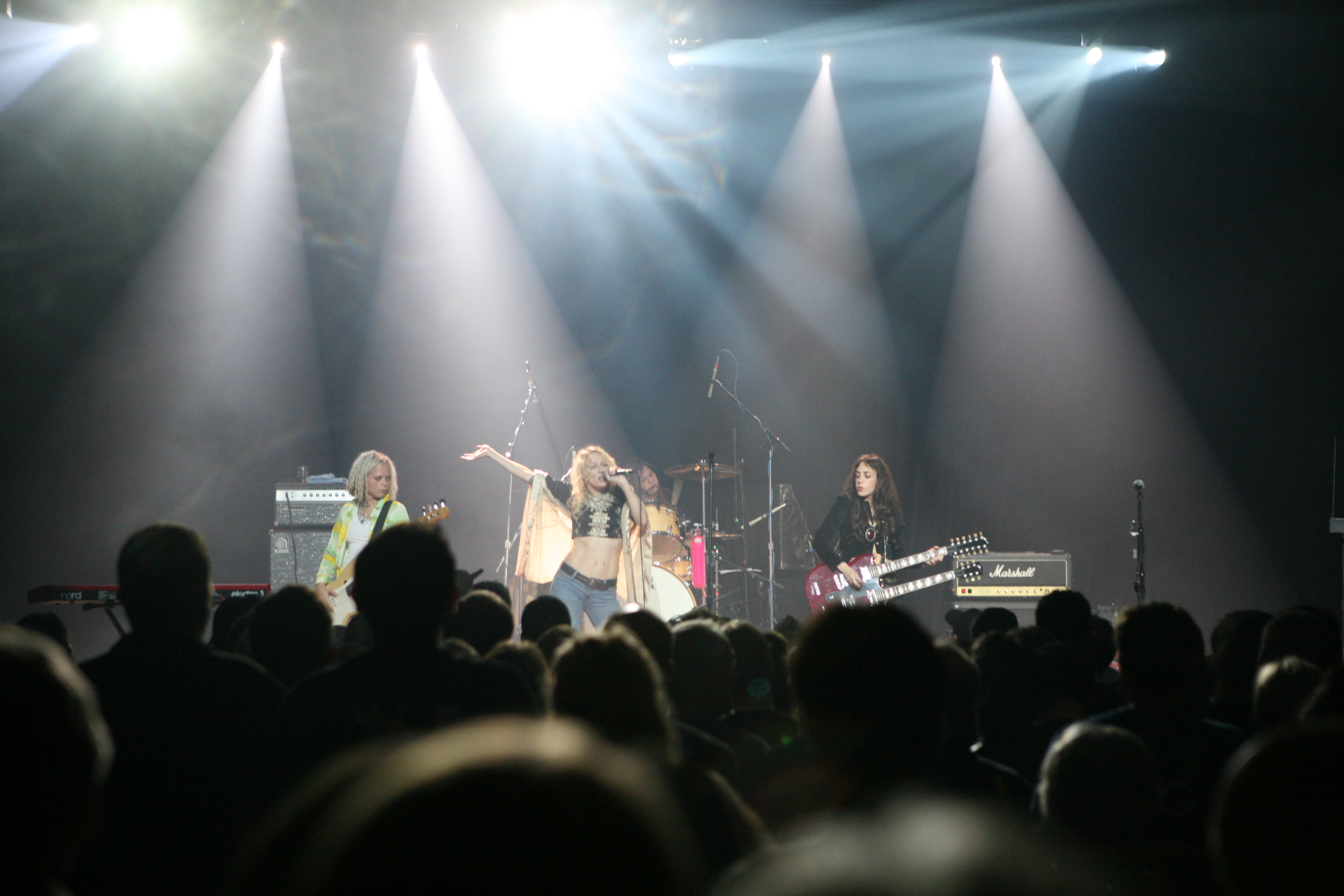
Lez Zeppelin performing in Falls Church, Virginia in 2009

In June 2005, Chuck Klosterman wrote an article for Spin that featured Lez Zeppelin as a leading protagonist in a trend of all-female hard rock "tribute" bands. He referred to the group as "the most powerful all-female band in rock history" and described the rise of bands like Lez Zeppelin as a "kind of multilayered cultural phenomenon." Stories about the group appeared in The Times, whose journalist called the band "the best new band I’ve seen all year, no question;" Reuters and CNN.com., which ran a front page feature that called the group so "electrifying" they are "driving club audiences to a frenzy."

In April 2007, after touring in the US and Europe the band released its first album, Lez Zeppelin, which was produced by Eddie Kramer, former recording engineer on several Led Zeppelin albums. In the wake of this release, the band was invited to festivals including the Download Festival in the UK; Rock am Ring and Rock im Park in Germany; and the Voodoo Festival in New Orleans.

The announcement in February 2008, that Led Zeppelin would take the stage at the Bonnaroo Festival, was an incorrect report by some news organizations since it was Lez Zeppelin which was due to perform.

Throughout 2008, the group continued to tour in the U.S. and in the late fall made its first visit to Japan to promote the release of its debut record. In March 2009, Lez Zeppelin played a benefit concert in Mumbai, India. In 2010, the band headed back into the studio to record a second album and released their re-recording of Led Zeppelin I.

The band continued to tour and had several line-up changes in the 2010s. In late 2019, the band released its EP The Island of Skyros.

== Members ==
- Steph Paynes – guitars, backing vocals, acoustic guitar, theremin
- Joan Chew – bass, backing vocals, keyboards
- Dana Athens - Vocals
- Hilary Blaze - Drums, gong

Former members

- Kris Bradley – vocals
- Lisa Brigantino – bass, mandolin, keyboards
- Shannon Conley – lead vocals, tambourine
- Gus Morgan (formerly Helen Destroy) – drums
- Jessica Fagre – keyboards
- Brooke Gengras – bass
- Wendy Kidd – drums
- Sarah McLellan – vocals
- Megan Thomas – bass, keyboards
- Leesa Harrington-Squyres – drums, backing vocals, gong
- Marlain Angelides – lead vocals, tambourine, harmonica

== Albums ==
=== 2007: Lez Zeppelin ===
Lez Zeppelin

Studio album by Lez Zeppelin
- Released: 2007
- Recorded: 2007
- Genre: Hard rock, blues rock
- Length: 38:30
- Label: Emanation
- Producer: Eddie Kramer

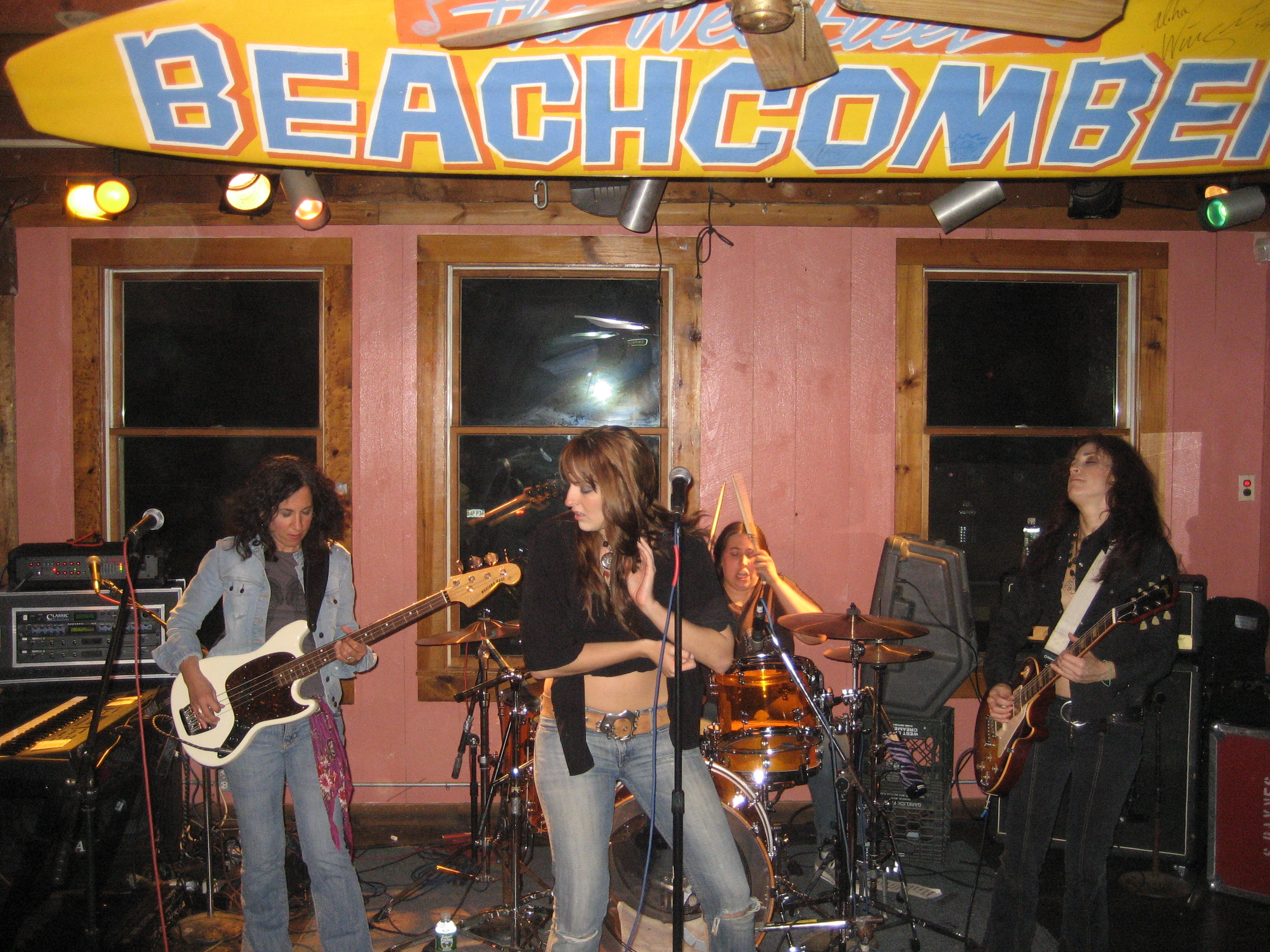
Lez Zeppelin in 2007, with Sarah McLellan on vocals

In late 2007, the band (then consisting of Steph Paynes, Sarah McLellan on vocals, Helen Destroy on drums and Lisa Brigantino on bass and keyboards) recorded its first album containing six Led Zeppelin selections (one song from each of the first six albums) and two originals. The album was recorded at Electric Lady Studios in New York City with producer/engineer Eddie Kramer, best known for his work with Led Zeppelin and Jimi Hendrix, and was mastered by George Marino, who digitally remastered all of the original Led Zeppelin recordings with Jimmy Page. Released on Emanation Records, the album is distributed by Redeye Distribution, and was also released and distributed in Japan by the Avex Music Group. Reviewing the release for AllMusic Guide, Alex Henderson wrote that the album is "worthwhile" and that the musicians "should not be dismissed as a mere novelty act"; the editorial team gave the release 3.5 out of five stars.

1. "Whole Lotta Love" – 5:44
2. "The Ocean" – 4:36
3. "On the Rocks" – 2:14
4. "Since I've Been Loving You" – 7:58
5. "Rock 'n Roll" – 3:52
6. "Winter Sun" – 2:41
7. "Communication Breakdown" – 2:43
8. "Kashmir" – 8:42

=== 2010: Lez Zeppelin I ===
Lez Zeppelin I

Studio album by Lez Zeppelin
- Released: 2010
- Recorded: 2010
- Genre: Hard rock, blues rock
- Length: 38:30
- Label: Pie
- Producer: Perry Margouleff, William Wittman

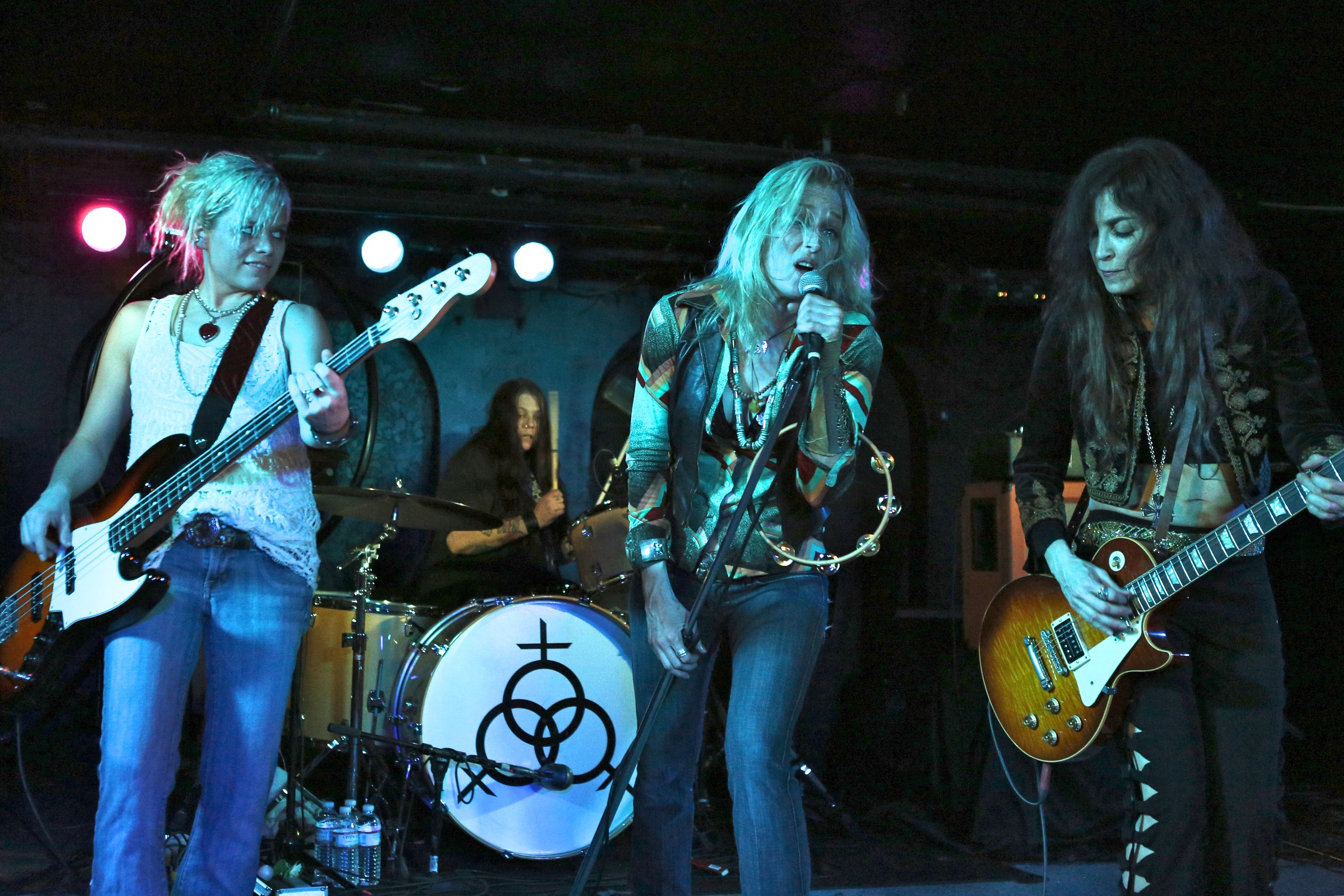
The 2012 line-up of the band

In 2010, the group (consisting of Steph Paynes, Leesa Harrington-Squyres, Megan Thomas, and Shannon Conley) returned to the studio to record a second album with producers Perry Margouleff and William Wittman that serves as a replication of Led Zeppelin’s 1969 debut. The album was recorded at Pie Studios in Glen Cove, New York, using all of the same analog gear and recording techniques, as well as the same vintage equipment used by Led in 1968. Released on Pie Records, the album is distributed by Redeye Distribution in the U.S. and was also released and distributed in Japan by the Avex Music Group. AllMusic Guide gave this album three out of five stars, with reviewer Stephen Thomas Erlewine writing that the tone and musicianship are correct but "ultimately it’s not much more than excellent advertising for their live gigs".

Track listing

1. "Good Times Bad Times" (Jimmy Page, John Paul Jones, and John Bonham)
2. "Babe I'm Gonna Leave You" (Anne Bredon/Jimmy Page, Robert Plant)
3. "You Shook Me" (Willie Dixon, J.B. Lenoir)
4. "Dazed and Confused" (Jimmy Page, inspired by Jake Holmes)
5. "Your Time Is Gonna Come" (Jimmy Page, John Paul Jones)
6. "Black Mountain Side" (Jimmy Page)
7. "Communication Breakdown" (Jimmy Page, John Paul Jones, John Bonham)
8. "I Can't Quit You Baby" (Willie Dixon)
9. "How Many More Times" (Jimmy Page, John Paul Jones, John Bonham)

=== 2019: The Island of Skyros ===
In 2015, the band released the "Mystic Snowman" single, which is a Christmas-themed re-write of "Stairway to Heaven" with "Frosty the Snowman". The band followed it with their 2019 album recorded with a string section.

1. "Battle of Evermore" – 5:46
2. "Achilles Last Stand" – 9:53
3. "Rain Song" – 7:40
4. "Immigrant Song" – 2:22
5. "Friends" – 4:18
6. "In the Light" – 9:24
