= Jobriath (album) =

Studio album by Jobriath
- Released: October 1973
- Studio: Electric Lady (New York City)
- Genre: Glam rock
- Length: 38:14
- Label: Elektra
- Producers: Jobriath; Edwin H. Kramer

Jobriath chronology
Pidgeon (1969)	Jobriath (1973)	Creatures of the Street (1974)

Jobriath is the debut studio album by the American rock musician Jobriath. Released in October 1973 by Elektra Records, Jobriath was preceded by a significant promotional campaign, attempting to create an American counterpart to David Bowie. The album received mostly positive reviews from critics, but sold poorly upon release. The album was recorded and co-produced by Eddie Kramer (credited as Edwin H. Kramer).

== Background ==
Jobriath had been a musician who was part of the group Pidgeon, and acted as a male lead in the New York and Los Angeles production of the musical Hair.

Discovered and later managed by Jerry Brandt, who heard Jobriath's demo tapes, Jobriath was the last act signed by Jac Holzman before leaving his position in the newly merged Elektra/Asylum Records. The advance in the signing reportedly cost from $50,000 to $500,000. Holzman later described it as one of his misjudgments and reportedly had no "emotional investment" in the music.

Jobriath was recorded at Electric Lady Studios in New York City, with Eddie Kramer co-producing the album. The album cover was photographed by Shig Ikeda.

== Release ==
The album was released on October 1973 by Elektra Records. Reportedly, the record company spent $30,000 on the advertisement. Most notably, the label set up a large poster of Jobriath in the Times Square area to promote the album. Elektra also bought a full page advertisement for Vogue, Rolling Stone, and Penthouse. In anticipation of Jobriath's scheduled live performance at the Paris Opera House, the album was also licensed to Barclay for release in France. Despite this, the album did not chart and was regarded as a commercial failure.

== Reception ==
Professional ratings
Review scores
Source	Rating
AllMusic	4/5 stars
New York Times	3/5 stars

According to author Jon Savage, the reception of Jobriath varied from mixed to positive during its initial release.

Rolling Stone was receptive to Jobriath, remarking that he had "talent to burn", as well as Record World which declared Jobriath a "renaissance man", predicting that he would "gain a tremendous following with the artful singing and songwriting". Record Mirror notes that despite the perceived David Bowie influences among others, Jobriath demonstrated versatility as a singer. Cashbox described Jobriath as an "interesting debut" that defies categorization "from hard rock to dramatic theatricality", naming "Morning Starship", "Take Me I'm Yours" and "I'maman" as highlights that display the tight musical arrangement and perceived "strangeness" of Jobriath's vocals that encourages replayability.

The New York Times and Esquire were less receptive, describing the album as "dismal" and "hype of the year", respectively. Ian MacDonald of NME acknowledged Jobriath as "reasonably gifted", but added that it "doesn't mean he's necessarily any good", and described him as an "interesting hype", while noting that Jobriath's musicianship were informed from his experiences in the productions of the musical Hair.

== Track listing ==
All tracks composed by Jobriath.

Side One
No.	Title	Length
1.	"Take Me I'm Yours"	4:14
2.	"Be Still"	3:40
3.	"World Without End"	3:43
4.	"Space Clown"	2:37
5.	"Earthling"	3:53
6.	"Movie Queen"	1:50
Total length:		19:57

Side Two
No.	Title	Length
7.	"I'maman"	3:35
8.	"Inside"	3:52
9.	"Morning Starship"	3:30
10.	"Rock of Ages"	2:21
11.	"Blow Away (a Paean for P.I.T.)"	4:59
Total length:		18:17

== Personnel ==
Personnel per Elektra Records.

"as performed by:"

- Jobriath
- Billy Schwartz
- Steve Love
- John Syomis
- Andy Munson

"Co-starring:"

- Ken Bichel
- Peter Frampton
- Carl Hall
- Tasha Thomas
- Rhetta Hughes
- Heather Macrae
- Zenobia

"Introducing:"

- Peggy Nestor

"and announcing"

- Gerhard

Produced by:

- Jobriath
- Eddie Kramer (credited as "Edwin H. Kramer")

"MERCI"

- Nigel - Electric Lady
- Steven Knee

Cover Photography: Shig Ikeda

Art Direction & Design: Robert L. Heimall
