= American Fiction (band) =

American indie rock band

- Origin: Memphis, Tennessee
- Genres: Indie rock
- Years active: 2014–present
- Members: Chris Johnson; Landon Moore; Patrick Fusco; Blake Rhea
- Website: americanfictionband.com

American Fiction are an American indie rock band formed in Memphis, Tennessee in 2014. The group consists of Chris Johnson (Vocals, Guitar), Landon Moore (Guitar), Patrick Fusco (Keyboards) and Blake Rhea (Bass). They released their debut record, Dumb Luck, on June 3, 2014. The ten song record was produced, engineered and mixed by Eddie Kramer.
