= Automaton (album) =

Studio album by Jamiroquai
- Released: 31 March 2017
- Recorded: 2015–2016
- Studios: Chillington (Buckinghamshire, England); AIR (London)
- Genres: Funk; R&B; disco
- Length: 57:07
- Label: Virgin EMI
- Producers: Matt Johnson; Jay Kay

Jamiroquai chronology
Rock Dust Light Star (2010)	Automaton (2017)

Singles from Automaton
- 1. "Automaton" Released: 27 January 2017; 2. "Cloud 9" Released: 10 February 2017; 3. "Superfresh" Released: 29 June 2017; 4. "Summer Girl" Released: 6 December 2017; 5. "Nights Out in the Jungle" Released: 5 January 2018

Automaton is the eighth studio album by English funk band Jamiroquai, released on 31 March 2017 through Virgin EMI. It is the band's first album in seven years, following Rock Dust Light Star (2010). It was a number-one album in Italy and peaked at number two in Switzerland, number three in France and number four in the UK. As of 2026, it is the band's most recent studio album.

== Background ==
Jay Kay described the inspiration for Automaton: "in recognition of the rise of artificial intelligence and technology in our world today and how we as humans are beginning to forget the more pleasant, simple and eloquent things in life and in our environment including our relationship with one another as human beings".

== Reception ==
Professional ratings
Aggregate scores
Source	Rating
Metacritic	71/100
Review scores
Source	Rating
AllMusic	3/5 stars
Consequence of Sound	B+
Exclaim!	3.5/5 stars
The Independent	3/5 stars
The Guardian	4/5 stars
The Observer	3/5 stars
Paste	8.6/10
Pitchfork	7.0/10
Slant Magazine	2.5/5 stars
The Yorkshire Times	4/5 stars

Upon release, the album received generally positive reviews. At Metacritic, which assigns a normalised rating out of 100 to reviews from music critics, the album received an average score of 71, which indicates "generally favorable reviews", based on 16 reviews.

In his review for AllMusic, Matt Collar concluded: "There are few bands who play classic disco-funk with as much genuine love for the genre and care in the productions as Kay and Jamiroquai. Ultimately, it's that sense of love and good vibes that drives much of Automaton."

Although not released as a single, "Shake it On" broke into the Official French Singles Chart, peaking at number 154.

== Promotion ==
The album had its worldwide radio premiere on 26 January 2017 at 20:00 GMT on BBC Radio 2's Jo Whiley Show, which played its first single, "Automaton". (Note: 20:23–20:28 GMT.)

=== Singles ===
On 27 January 2017, Jamiroquai released online a video version of the title track as the album's lead single.

On 10 February 2017, Jamiroquai released an audio version of the track "Cloud 9", and on 22 February 2017 released online the video version featuring actress Monica Cruz.

On 29 June 2017, the band released "Superfresh" as the third official single from the album. An accompanying music video was produced without active participation from front man Jay Kay, whose back injury most likely left him unable to attend the filming. As a result, cut scenes from the "Automaton" video were interspersed throughout it.

In December 2017, a fourth single, "Summer Girl", was released. It was followed by "Nights Out in the Jungle" in January 2018.

=== Tour ===
On 17 January 2017, Jamiroquai announced a 10-date festival tour of Asia and Europe due to start on 25 May 2017 in Tokyo, Japan, and to end on 5 August 2017 in Zambujeira do Mar, Portugal; the tour also included shows in South Korea, Greece, the Netherlands, Italy, Finland, France, Switzerland and Czech Republic.

On 1 February 2017, Jamiroquai announced a new show: on 9 August 2017 at Smukfest, Skanderborg, Denmark.

On 3 February 2017, Jamiroquai announced two new shows, in France and the UK: on 28 March 2017 at the Salle Pleyel, Paris and on 31 March 2017 at the Roundhouse, London. The two shows were sold out in less than one minute.

Two new band members joined at the time of the tour: Nate Williams on guitar and keyboards, and Howard Whiddett on Ableton Live.

Jamiroquai also announced they would take part on 12 August 2017 in the Boardmasters Festival, Newquay, Cornwall, United Kingdom.

== Track listing ==
All tracks are written by Jay Kay and Matt Johnson, except "Nights Out in the Jungle" by Kay.

No.	Title	Length
1.	"Shake It On"	5:14
2.	"Automaton"	4:47
3.	"Cloud 9"	3:56
4.	"Superfresh"	3:48
5.	"Hot Property"	4:31
6.	"Something About You"	3:58
7.	"Summer Girl"	5:31
8.	"Nights Out in the Jungle"	5:09
9.	"Dr Buzz"	6:01
10.	"We Can Do It"	4:06
11.	"Vitamin"	4:26
12.	"Carla"	5:33
Total length:		57:07

Japanese bonus track
No.	Title	Length
13.	"Nice and Spicy"	4:41
Total length:		61:48

== Personnel ==
Credits adapted from liner notes.

- Jay Kay – vocals
- Matt Johnson – keyboards, engineering, programming
- Paul Turner – bass guitar
- Rob Harris – guitar
- Derrick McKenzie – drums
- Sola Akingbola – percussion
- John Thirkell – trumpet, flugel, horn arrangements
- Andy Greenwood – trumpet, flugel
- Dave Bishop – saxophones
- Neil Sidwell – trombone
- Joshua Blair – engineering
- John Prestage – engineering assistance
- Mick Guzauski – mixing
- JP Chalbos – mastering

== Charts ==
=== Weekly charts ===
Chart (2017)	Peak position
Australian Albums (ARIA)	7
Austrian Albums (Ö3 Austria)	6
Belgian Albums (Ultratop Flanders)	11
Belgian Albums (Ultratop Wallonia)	10
Canadian Albums (Billboard)	19
Dutch Albums (Album Top 100)	4
Finnish Albums (Suomen virallinen lista)	14
French Albums (SNEP)	3
German Albums (Offizielle Top 100)	5
Hungarian Albums (MAHASZ)	13
Irish Albums (IRMA)	13
Italian Albums (FIMI)	1
New Zealand Albums (RMNZ)	30
Polish Albums (ZPAV)	17
Portuguese Albums (AFP)	18
Scottish Albums (Official Charts)	4
Spanish Albums (Promusicae)	4
Swiss Albums (Schweizer Hitparade)	2
UK Albums (Official Charts)	4
US Billboard 200	94
US Top Dance Albums (Billboard)	2

=== Year-end charts ===
Chart (2017)	Position
Belgian Albums (Ultratop Flanders)	200
Belgian Albums (Ultratop Wallonia)	140
French Albums (SNEP)	188
Swiss Albums (Schweizer Hitparade)	64

== Certifications ==
Region	Certification	Certified units/sales
United Kingdom (BPI)	Silver	60,000^{‡}
^{‡} Sales+streaming figures based on certification alone.
