= Jerry Brandt =

American impresario (1938–2021)

- Born: January 29, 1938
- Died: January 16, 2021 (aged 82)

Jerry Brandt (January 29, 1938 – January 16, 2021) was an American entrepreneur, impresario, agent, manager, promoter, and club owner who was active from the 1960s on. He is known for discovering Carly Simon and serving as her first manager, as well as for his work with Lori Petty.

== Life and career ==
Born in Bensonhurst, Brooklyn, to a Jewish mother and Puerto Rican father, Brandt served in the U.S. Army and afterwards first worked as a messenger in the mailroom at the William Morris Agency. Within a few years, he moved up the ranks and became head of the pop music division. While working at William Morris, he discovered Chubby Checker, booked acts like The Beach Boys and Sonny & Cher, and brought The Rolling Stones to the USA. He also handled Sam Cooke, Dick Clark, and Muhammad Ali for theatrical events. In the 1970s, he managed glam rock artist Jobriath Boone, and in 2012, appeared in the documentary Jobriath A.D..

Contemporaneous with his management work, Brandt also opened, owned, and managed major music venues such as The Electric Circus (1967), The Ritz, and Spo-Dee-O-Dee, a Blues Club. In 1970 he left the Electric Circus and moved to Los Angeles where he opened the Paradise Ballroom with legendary financier Bernie Cornfeld. The club, an attempt to re-create The Electric Circus in Los Angeles, was a failure and Cornfeld closed the business.

Brandt returned to New York where he subsequently produced the legendary flop Broadway musical Got Tu Go Disco, which closed in 1979 after nine previews and eight performances.

In 1992, Brandt, along with Ron Delsener, Robin Leach, and Bob Krasnow, opened the Italian restaurant "Italica" at 220 East 46th St. which introduced "pizza by the meter."

== Personal life ==
Brandt married actress Janet Margolin in August 1968. They divorced in 1971, following his arrest for marijuana in Toronto where he blamed Margolin for the narcotics found in his possession. Commenting on the marriage during a 1979 interview, Brandt said, "...being married to Janet was like being in the intensive care unit. In California she went to a shrink six days a week and I went three days. Finally, I said 'forget it.'"

Following the closure of the Paradise Ballroom, Brandt left California, taking Cornfeld's girlfriend, Peggy Nestor, back to New York.

Brandt died from COVID-19 and pneumonia in Miami Beach, Florida, amidst the COVID-19 pandemic in Florida. He was 82.
