= Jobriath =

American singer (1946–1983)

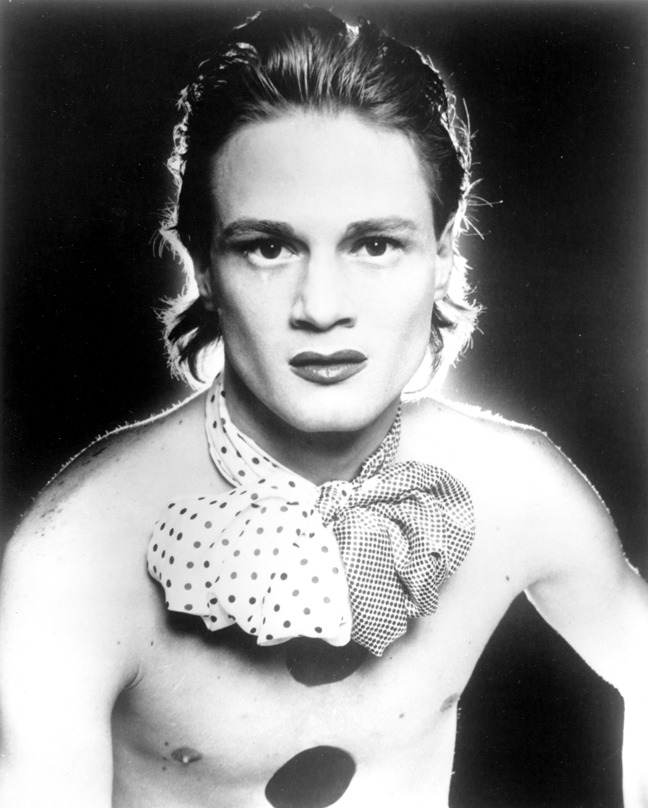
- Jobriath in 1973

Background information
- Also known as: Jobriath Salisbury; Jobriath Boone; Cole Berlin; Bryce Campbell
- Born: Bruce Wayne Campbell; December 14, 1946; Philadelphia, Pennsylvania, U.S.
- Died: August 3, 1983 (aged 36) (Note: Jobriath's death date has been given as August 3, 1983, and this is the date which appears on his gravestone. However, a 2021 article in The New York Times simply says he died "in the summer of 1983", and references a 2004 article in The Independent, which reports that he was found dead in July 1983, and had died more than a week before then.) New York City, U.S.
- Genres: Glam rock; psychedelic pop
- Occupations: Singer; songwriter; actor; record producer
- Years active: 1965–1983
- Labels: Decca; Elektra; Sanctuary; Universal; Eschatone

Bruce Wayne Campbell (December 14, 1946 – August 3, 1983), known by his stage name Jobriath, was an American rock musician and actor. He was the first openly gay rock musician to be signed to a major record label and one of the first internationally famous musicians to die of AIDS.

== Biography ==
=== Early life and career ===
Born Bruce Wayne Campbell in Philadelphia, Pennsylvania, Jobriath showed early musical talent for playing the piano, and soon played organ in his local church. It was during this time his talents led him to being introduced to Eugene Ormandy as a child prodigy. While he was a high school student, he became further interested in classical music, and favored composers such as Sergei Prokofiev. He wrote the first two movements of his first symphony by his senior year in high school, but for reasons unknown chose not to complete it.

After graduating from Upper Merion High School (in King of Prussia, Pennsylvania) in 1964, Jobriath took an interest in folk music, partly inspired by seeing Peter, Paul and Mary in concert several times. He briefly formed a folk group with the help of his music teacher who arranged for identical twins Marty and Grace to join him. As a trio they named themselves "The Last Three", and played several regional shows in the PA area before Marty and Grace departed for college. While Jobriath attended Temple University for one semester in the music program, he soon dropped out. He was drafted into the U.S. Army in the mid-1960s and went AWOL within months. Renaming himself Jobriath Salisbury, he relocated to Los Angeles.

=== Casting in Hair and early recordings with Pidgeon ===
After accompanying a friend to the audition for the musical Hair as a piano player, he impressed the producer and director with his singing and talents on the piano. He was soon cast by the director Tom O'Horgan into the leading role of Woof, a character implied to be gay. He appeared in the legendary West Coast production at the Aquarius Theater on Sunset Boulevard. Despite receiving positive reviews for his performances, he was fired from the production for "upstaging" the other actors. After leaving the production in 1969, he joined the folk-rock band Pidgeon, which was then signed to Decca Records, as their lead singer, pianist and guitarist. The band recorded a debut album originally titled First Flight From the Forest which was re-titled by their label as the self-titled Pidgeon, and—shortly after the album's release—the band released the single "Rubber Bricks" b/w "Prison Walls" before disbanding. Both were produced by Stan Farber. At this time he was traced by the Military Police and arrested, spending nearly six months in a military psychiatric hospital after suffering a breakdown. During this period he began writing the songs that would lead to his next musical incarnation.

=== Jerry Brandt, the hype and Jobriath Boone ===
In mid-December 1972, Jerry Brandt, Carly Simon's former manager, overheard a demo tape being played by Clive Davis at Columbia Records. Davis rejected the tape as "mad, unstructured and destructive to melody", but Brandt was quick to step in. Jobriath later remarked "that coming from a man who discovered both Patti Smith and Barry Manilow...so much for sanity and structure!" Brandt located Jobriath in California, where he was living in an unfurnished apartment and working as a prostitute. Brandt: "In walked this beautiful creature dressed in white. I said, Why don't you come out to Malibu and hang out?" This became a feature of the mythology used to promote Jobriath, and helps to explain the acrimony that followed the dissolution of their professional and personal relationship.

Brandt signed Jobriath, now calling himself Jobriath Boone, to Elektra Records for a reported $500,000, in what was allegedly the most lucrative recording contract of its time. Jobriath was signed to a two-album deal. A huge marketing campaign and media blitz ensued, including full-page advertisements in Vogue, Penthouse, and Rolling Stone magazines, full-length posters on over 250 New York City buses and a huge 41 ft (12 m) by 43 ft (13 m) billboard in Times Square. All featured the forthcoming debut album sleeve design by noted photographer Shig Ikeda, which featured a nude Jobriath, made to resemble an ancient Roman statue. Plans were announced for a lavish three night live debut at the Paris Opera that December, at a cost of $200,000 and a subsequent tour of European opera houses. Jobriath informed the press that the show would feature him dressed as "King Kong being projected upwards on a mini Empire State Building. This will turn into a giant spurting penis and I will have transformed into Marlene Dietrich." Elektra, concerned about spiraling production costs, postponed the Paris Opera shows until February, later canceling them due to expense.

Amidst this barrage of promotion, the debut album Jobriath was released on June 15, 1973, garnering mostly positive reviews. Rolling Stone stated that Jobriath had "talent to burn", Cashbox called it "truly one of the most interesting albums of the year", and Record World hailed it as "brilliantly incisive", referring to Jobriath as "a true Renaissance man who will gain a tremendous following". Esquire disagreed, calling it "the hype of the year". The album was co-produced by Eddie Kramer and Jobriath, featuring string arrangements by Jobriath, recorded at Olympic Studios with the London Symphony Orchestra. Kramer described Jobriath in Mojo as "a romantic soul, really. He wanted orchestrations like old film music, though he knew nothing about scoring. So he bought a book on orchestration and within a week he'd come up with scores of a haunting quality". Peter Frampton is also credited on the album, though his contribution is unclear.

During this period, Brandt continued making extravagant statements such as "Elvis, the Beatles, and Jobriath" and declaring that both he and Jobriath had booked flights on Pan American's first passenger flight to the Moon. Meanwhile, Jobriath declared himself "rock's truest fairy", a comment that did little to increase his popularity at the time but has since confirmed his status as the first openly gay rock singer to be signed to a major record label.

Jobriath's debut public performance was made on television, when Brandt secured him an appearance on the popular show The Midnight Special. The costumes were designed by Jobriath and the choreography was by Joyce Trisler, of the Joffrey Ballet. Two songs were performed: "I'maman" and "Rock of Ages", the latter substituting for "Take Me I'm Yours" which was pulled after the producer objected to its overtly sado-masochistic theme. The long-awaited live performance finally came in July 1974 with two sold-out shows at New York's The Bottom Line club. Sales for the album, however, were poor, and it failed to secure a chart placing.

Six months after the release of the debut album, Creatures of the Street was released, again featuring Peter Frampton, as well as John Paul Jones of Led Zeppelin. The costumes were by Stephen Sprouse. The photography was by Gered Mankowitz. Compiled from the extensive sessions for its predecessor, it was launched without any fanfare or media promotion and failed commercially. A US tour followed, where Jobriath and his backing-band (called 'The Creatures') did several residencies around the US (in Philadelphia, Boston, Chicago, San Francisco, Los Angeles & Memphis) during which recordings took place at local studios for a projected third album. Despite the tour having several well-attended shows and/or several sold-out nights, both Brandt and Elektra stopped financing the tour midway through. Despite this, Jobriath and the band completed the tour, continuing to bill Elektra for expenses. A final show, at the University of Alabama, ended in five encores and the fire department being summoned when the excited audience set off the alarm.

=== Cole Berlin, cabaret and The Chelsea Hotel ===
In January 1975, Jobriath announced his retirement from the music industry and moved into a pyramid-topped rooftop apartment at the Chelsea Hotel in New York City. He attempted to resume his acting career, and was invited to audition for the role of Al Pacino's lover in the film Dog Day Afternoon. According to keyboard player Hayden Wayne, Jobriath had the script for Dog Day Afternoon backstage at a concert at Nassau Coliseum, and claimed he did not want to do the film due to the character's wearing of a dress. Calling himself "Cole Berlin" (a play on both Cole Porter and Irving Berlin), he worked as a cabaret singer at a restaurant called the Covent Garden, as well as clubs and cabarets, augmenting his income with occasional prostitution. In a 1979 interview, he said the Jobriath persona had "committed suicide in a drug, alcohol and publicity overdose".

=== Death ===
By the time his 10-year contract with Brandt was finally up, Jobriath was sick with AIDS. He began to feel ill in late 1981 but still contributed to the Chelsea Hotel's 100th birthday celebrations in November 1982 and continued to perform cabaret until shortly before his death. He died at his residence at The Chelsea in 1983.

== Legacy ==
In November 2004, long-time fan Morrissey oversaw Jobriath's first CD re-issue, a compilation called Lonely Planet Boy. It was produced by Eddie Kramer. Morrissey had previously attempted to secure Jobriath as a support act for the tour in support of his Your Arsenal album, having been unaware that the singer had died some years earlier. Both Jobriath's original studio albums were officially reissued on CD in Japan in late 2007, remastered and issued in mini-vinyl replica sleeves. They were released in the U.S. in standard jewel-box packaging in 2008 by Collectors' Choice Music.

The group Balcony released a semi-tribute track entitled "Jobriath" as a free MP3 anonymously on the internet in 2000 that was later included on their second album Before Needs. He is referenced using his legal name by the indie-folk band Okkervil River on the final song of their 2008 album The Stand Ins, entitled "Bruce Wayne Campbell Interviewed on the Roof of the Chelsea Hotel, 1979". Def Leppard released a cover of "Heartbeat" on some versions of their 2006 album Yeah!. "Morning Starship" was sampled by hip-hop artist Ill Bill on the title track to his 2007 mixtape album Black Metal.

Filmmaker Kieran Turner (24 Nights) created a feature documentary about the late singer called Jobriath A.D. On March 28, 2012, English singer Marc Almond said of Jobriath on his retrospective, "For me, above all else, he was a sexual hero: truly the first gay pop star. How extreme that was to the US at the time. His outrageous appearances on the hallowed US rock show The Midnight Special prompted shock, bewilderment and disgust. Everyone hated Jobriath – even, and especially, gay people. He was embarrassingly effeminate in an era of leather and handlebar moustaches." On July 11, 2012, Ann Magnuson released an EP featuring four Jobriath songs and a spoken-word narrative. On October 29, 2013, Eschatone Records released three 1971 Jobriath tracks digitally and on 10" vinyl as the EP Amazing Dope Tales. On May 6, 2014, Eschatone Records released As the River Flows, a full-length album of never-before released Jobriath recordings from 1971 to 1972 on CD, limited edition vinyl and in digital format. On December 5, 2018, Morrissey released a statement that his next album, California Son, would open with a cover of Jobriath's "Morning Starship".

== Discography ==
=== Studio albums ===
- 1969 Pidgeon (as the band "Pigeon") – Decca
- 1973 Jobriath – Elektra
- 1974 Creatures of the Street – Elektra

=== Compilations ===
- 2004 Lonely Planet Boy – Attack / Sanctuary
- 2014 As the River Flows (1972 demo recordings) – Eschatone
- 2015 Popstar: The Lost Musical – Factory25

=== Singles ===
- 1969 "Rubber Bricks" / "Prison Walls" (with Pidgeon) – Decca
- 1974 "Take Me I'm Yours" / "Earthling" – Elektra
- 1974 "I'maman" / "Rock of Ages" – Elektra / Barclay
- 1974 "Liten Up" / "Ooh La La" – Elektra
- 1974 "Street Corner Love" / "Rock of Ages" – Elektra
- 1974 "Ooh La La" / "Gone Tomorrow" – Elektra
- 2004 "I Love a Good Fight" + "Scumbag" – Attack / Sanctuary
- 2013 "Amazing Dope Tales" + "As the River Flows" + "City Freak" – Eschatone
