= Liam Gallagher: As It Was =

2019 documentary film

- Film poster
- Directed by: Charlie Lightening; Gavin Fitzgerald
- Produced by: Steven Lappin
- Edited by: Nick J. Webb
- Production companies: Lorten Entertainment; Firepit; Lightening Films; Toughnut Films
- Distributed by: Screen Media Films
- Release date: 7 June 2019 (United Kingdom)
- Running time: 83 minutes
- Country: United Kingdom
- Language: English
- Box office: $477,009

Liam Gallagher: As It Was is a 2019 British documentary film directed by Charlie Lightening and Gavin Fitzgerald. The film details singer Liam Gallagher's transition from being a member of band Oasis to a solo musician. It received mixed reviews.

== Synopsis ==
The film showcases musician Liam Gallagher's transition into a solo act following his band Oasis' split in 2009 and estrangement from his brother, Noel Gallagher.

== Production and release ==
The film was directed by Charlie Lightening and Gavin Fitzgerald. Prior to its release, Gallagher claimed his brother, Noel Gallagher, threatened legal action against him if he used footage of Oasis. The documentary was released in theatres in the United States on 13 September 2019. It was distributed by Screen Media Films. It arrived on video-on-demand platforms on 8 October 2019.

== Reception ==
=== Box office ===
The film grossed $475,877 in the United Kingdom and $1,132 in New Zealand, for a worldwide total of $477,009.

=== Critical reception ===
Mike McCahill for The Guardian gave the film 3 out of 5 stars, describing it as a conventional rock documentary that offered a candid look at the singer's post-Oasis challenges and personal growth, highlighting both his enduring charisma and emerging humility. Frank Scheck for The Hollywood Reporter praised Liam Gallagher's "electrifying presence", but criticised the direction of the film, referring to the film as "self-aggrandizing promotional project that the famously arrogant pop star would have once sneered at". Chris Willman for Variety commented that As It Was was a limited documentary that, while benefiting from Gallagher's personality and candid humour, failed to fully explore the complexity of his post-Oasis career and instead becomes a celebratory promotional piece.

Ian Freer for Empire noted the film benefits from Gallagher's charisma and humour, but criticised the film for lacking a clear point of view, critical engagement, or stylistic innovation. Michael Rechtshaffen for The Los Angeles Times criticised the depiction of Gallagher, suggesting that his personality was santised for the film. He also commented that the film felt like a promotional piece, especially with its release coinciding with the release of Gallagher's second solo studio album, Why Me? Why Not. Jordan Bassett for NME gave the documentary 4 out of 5 stars, praising it as an intimate insight into Gallagher's life since the split of Oasis.

== Accolades ==
Year	Award	Category	Result	Ref(s).
2020	NME Awards	Best Music Film	Won	
2021	National Film Awards UK	Best Documentary	Won	
