= Hayden Wayne =

American composer and librettist

Hayden Wayne (born March 2, 1949) is a modern American composer and librettist. Due to his background in popular music, his style is an amalgamation of classical music influenced by popular idioms. Wayne also has several film scores and award-winning commercials for television to his credit.

== Biography ==
His study of the piano began at the age of four, played tenor drum in the orchestra pit of The King And I at the age of five which his father was conducting, and performed his first composition in concert at the age of eleven. He won a second prize medal for piano solo from the New York State Music Awards at fifteen and subsequently toured with a series of rock 'n' roll bands including Man on CBS Records and Jobriath on Elektra Records.

As a composer, Wayne opened a new theater for the Mark Taper Forum in Los Angeles with his metaphorical circus Wire, won national first place (1987) from the National Institute for Music Theater with NEON (A Street Opera). In 2002, NEON won a 25,000 DM prize in the Prague Opera Competition.

He was commissioned to write In Memoriam: A Celebration by the Interfaith Concert of Holocaust Remembrance, which premiered at Saint John the Divine in New York in 1993. This was subsequently linked with Sinfonietta No. 1: The Klezmer and An Elegy Into Madness, specifically commissioned for the Fiftieth Anniversary of Israel, and titled A Triptych, which had its world première at Mandel Hall, the University of Chicago in January 1998.

== Selected works ==
To date, Wayne has written over 400 compositions including: The Symphony of Friends, the ballet Cirque de la Lune, Dracula (Opera Erotica), Piano Concerto #1 (The Rock 'n' Roll) and Cello Concerto #1 which are paired as a diptych: Sinfonietta #2 (It's a Boy) and #3 (The Emerald) and Symphony #5 Africa (A Tone Poem) (also recorded by the State Philharmonic of Brno); the string quartets The Rosenberger Variations and The Romantic, The Nuzerov Quartets 3, 4, and 5, Nuzerov Quartets 6, 7, and 8, and Nuzerov Quartets 9 and 10 performed by the Wallinger String Quartet which were all released on New Millennium Records.

In recent times, most of his performances have taken place in the Czech Republic. Wayne calls his style "The New Classicism." He lives in Dutchess County, New York with his wife and son. He has provided the music for the Randolph School's Circus show in May 2007.
