= Fermatta Music Academy =

Higher education music school in Mexico

Fermatta Music University Center
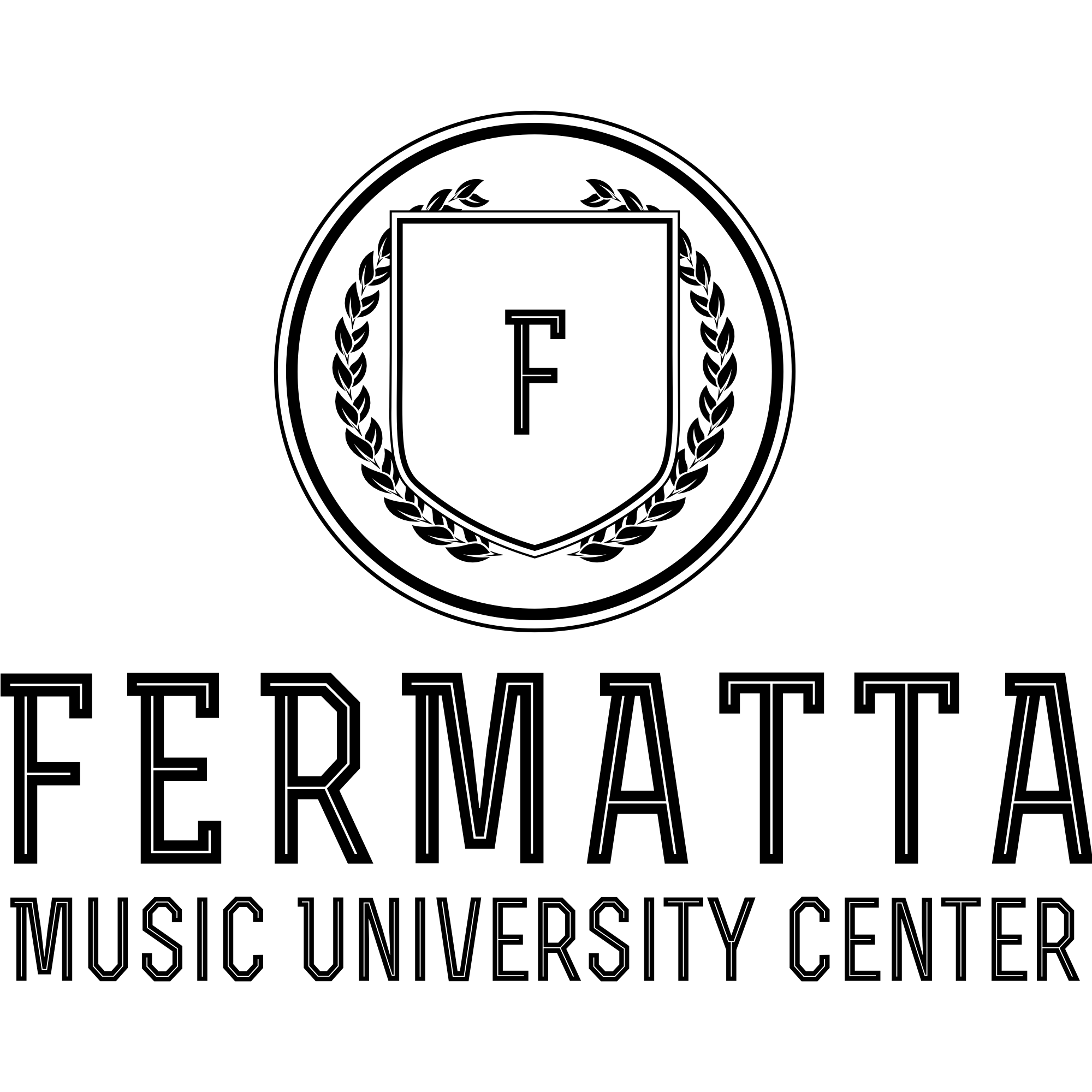
- Type: Private
- Established: 1993
- Location: Mexico City, Guadalajara, Monterrey, Querétaro and Puebla, Mexico
- Campus: Urban
- Website: https://www.fermatta.university/

The Fermatta Music University Center, also known as Centro Universitario de Música Fermatta, is an institution specializing in professional music education. Founded in 1993, it has campuses in Mexico City, Mexico, Guadalajara, Jalisco, Monterrey, Nuevo León, Querétaro, Querétaro and Puebla, Mexico.

The Fermatta Music University Center is a founding member of the International Association of Music Colleges and Universities. It is the first institution of musical education at the professional level endorsed by the Ministry of Education in Mexico.

== History ==
The Fermatta Music University Center was founded in 1993 with the aim to cultivate musicians by providing modern music education.

As a pioneer in teaching contemporary music, one of the first awards Fermatta received was the certification granted by the Mexican government's Secretary of Public Education. This official recognition made it the first school capable of offering undergraduate studies in the areas of composition, execution and engineering with a focus on contemporary music.

The twentieth anniversary of the university was a year of consolidation of the educational project and international recognition of the educational work of the institution. In May 2013, the International Association of Music Colleges and Universities was established in London, England, an organization to which the Fermatta University Music Center has belonged since then.

== Academic programs ==
The Fermatta Music University Center offers a range of academic programs for students seeking Bachelor's and master's degrees. These programs include:

Four-year bachelor's degree programs

- Bachelor's in Sound Engineering and Music Production
- Bachelor's in Contemporary Music Composition
- Bachelor's in Music Performance
- Bachelor's in Music and Entertainment Business

Two-year master's degree programs

- Master's in Sound Design for Film, Television and Video Games.
- Master's in International Music and Entertainment Business.

== Campus ==
Fermatta Music University Center operates several campuses across different cities in Mexico. These campuses include:

- Mexico City Campus: Located in Tabacalera, Cuauhtemoc Delegation, Mexico City.
- Guadalajara Campus: Situated in Guadalajara Centro, Guadalajara, Jalisco, Mexico.
- Monterrey Campus: Found in Monterrey Center, Nuevo Leon, Mexico.
- Querétaro Campus: Located in El Retablo Neighborhood, Santiago de Querétaro, Querétaro, México.
- Puebla Campus: Located in Reforma Sur, Puebla, Puebla, Mexico.

== See also ==
- Music of Mexico
