= Eddie Kramer =

British audio engineer and producer (born 1942)

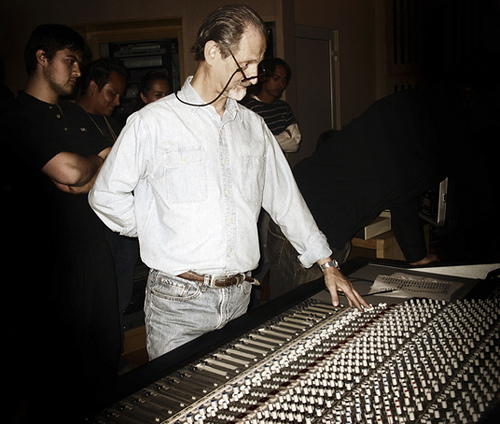
- Kramer giving a masterclass at Fermatta Music Academy in 2008

Background information
- Born: Edwin H. Kramer; 19 April 1942 (age 84)
- Origin: Cape Town, Union of South Africa
- Genre: Rock
- Occupations: Producer; audio engineer
- Years active: 1962–present
- Website: eddie-kramer.com

Edwin H. Kramer (born 19 April 1942) is a South African-born recording producer and engineer. He has collaborated with Jimi Hendrix, the Beatles, David Bowie, the Rolling Stones, Led Zeppelin, Eric Clapton, the Kinks, Kiss, John Mellencamp, and Carlos Santana, among others, as well as records for other well-known artists in various genres.

Kramer's film soundtrack credits include Blue Wild Angel: Live at the Isle of Wight, Festival Express, Jimi Plays Monterey, Jimi Plays Berkeley, Live at the Fillmore East, Mad Dogs and Englishmen, The Pursuit of Happiness, Rainbow Bridge, The Song Remains the Same, and Woodstock: Music from the Original Soundtrack and More. Kramer was interviewed extensively in Jimi Hendrix: Hear My Train a Comin', a two-hour American Masters documentary which debuted in November 2013.

He is also a photographer who has exhibited a number of his intimate images of performers, particularly Hendrix, with whom he worked on Are You Experienced, Axis: Bold as Love, Electric Ladyland, Band of Gypsys, and The Cry of Love, as well as the posthumous Valleys of Neptune, People, Hell and Angels, Miami Pop Festival, and other releases produced through Experience Hendrix, the organization formed by Hendrix's heirs. Eddie also did some indie work with 24K, a band from Toronto, Ontario, Canada.

== Early life ==
Kramer was born in Cape Town to Jewish art and music-loving parents Sonny and Minna Kramer, active opponents of apartheid who moved from South Africa to London in the early 1960s for political reasons. At age four he began studying the piano. That instrument remained his first love, but he also dabbled with the violin and the cello. He studied classical piano at the South African College of Music. During these studies he became fascinated with jazz and rock, much to his father's chagrin. Kramer moved to London at age 19, some six months after his parents' relocating there. There he recorded jazz groups in a home studio with primitive recording equipment, installed hi-fi equipment in antique furniture, and installed album playback systems for the Soho Record Centre, the preeminent London record store chain of the day.

== Career ==
=== 1960s ===
Kramer got his first industry job in 1962 at Advision Studios. A year later he was hired by Pye Studios, where he assisted on mobile recordings of classical works. He also assisted on Pye Studios recordings by the Kinks, the Searchers, the Undertakers, Petula Clark, and Sammy Davis Jr. In 1964 he founded KPS Studios, a mono- and two-track facility which was acquired in 1965 by Regent Sound, where the Rolling Stones had recorded their first album. Regent then tasked Kramer to help build and run their new four-track studio. The Beatles had recorded "Fixing a Hole" there, later to be featured on their 1967 album Sgt. Pepper's Lonely Hearts Club Band. Kramer engineered two Beatles songs that appeared as a single and on Magical Mystery Tour—"All You Need Is Love" and "Baby, You're a Rich Man". The two songs were recorded at Olympic Studios, where, in 1967, Kramer engineered albums for the Rolling Stones, Small Faces, Traffic, and Jimi Hendrix. Kramer became a permanent part of Hendrix's creative process, collaborating on the four albums which Hendrix released before his death in 1970.

In 1968 Kramer relocated to New York, primarily to continue working with Hendrix. Headquartered first at The Record Plant and later working as an independent producer and engineer, Kramer produced the first Johnny Winter album and engineered a sequence of five Led Zeppelin albums, beginning with Led Zeppelin II.

Kramer and his crew engineered the sound at the 1969 Woodstock Festival; they recorded the entire festival in a harried, sleepless, three-day binge, using vitamin B shots for stamina. The brilliant performances from several of rock's then-reigning acts are documented in both the film, Woodstock, and the three-disc album Woodstock: Music from the Original Soundtrack and More.

=== 1970s ===
Kramer began the second decade of his career working alongside architect John Storyk to oversee creation of Jimi Hendrix's state-of-the-art studio, Electric Lady Studios, built and equipped for a then-astonishing $1 million. He served as Director of Engineering there from 1970 to 1974, producing Carly Simon's debut solo album, Carly Simon, as well as albums for Sha Na Na and Peter Frampton, and also engineering albums for Lena Horne, Dionne Warwick, and David Bowie, David Live and Young Americans. (The latter featured rhythm guitar from John Lennon on its Number One hit, "Fame".)

In 1971 he mixed Humble Pie's double album Performance Rockin' the Fillmore, featuring Steve Marriott and Peter Frampton, as well as Larry Corryell's Barefoot Boy, his first and only album for Flying Dutchman label, and Curtis Mayfield's double album Curtis/Live!, his first release after leaving the Impressions. In 1973 Kramer mixed Led Zeppelin's Houses of the Holy. In the same year he began a lengthy association with Kiss. Earlier he had produced a four-song demo that won their first recording contract. He eventually produced Alive!, Alive II, Double Platinum, Rock and Roll Over, Love Gun, Alive III as well as Ace Frehley's first solo album, Ace Frehley, which yielded a hit single, "New York Groove". Also in 1973 he engineered the live Derek and the Dominos album In Concert. Also released in 1973 was the debut album by Jobriath. The following year saw the release of Jobriath's sophomore (and final) album, Creatures Of The Street, also co-produced by Kramer.

Kramer left Electric Lady Studios in 1975. Working independently, he engineered the Rolling Stones' Love You Live, Led Zeppelin's Physical Graffiti and The Song Remains the Same, and Peter Frampton's Frampton Comes Alive!, the biggest-selling album of 1976, a 2-disc release that sold over 14 million units. In the same year he mixed Bad Company's third album, Run with the Pack.

=== 1980s ===
Kramer produced Buddy Guy, classical guitarist John Williams, award-winning country group the Kentucky Headhunters, hard rock and metal bands such as Whitesnake, Triumph, Icon, Pretty Maids, Fastway, Alcatrazz featuring Steve Vai and Graham Bonnet, and Anthrax. He produced Among the Living for Anthrax in 1987, which yielded a Top 10 single in the UK, "I Am the Law".

=== 1990s ===
September 1992 saw the publication of a book co-authored by Kramer and John McDermott. Hendrix: Setting the Record Straight was built on Kramer's years of collaboration with Hendrix, augmented by fresh interviews with key musicians and other participants in the meteoric Hendrix career.

In 1993 Kramer produced and engineered Stone Free: A Tribute to Jimi Hendrix, featuring tracks by Jeff Beck, Eric Clapton, the Cure, Buddy Guy, classical violinist Nigel Kennedy, Living Colour, jazz guitarist Pat Metheny, hip hop artists P.M. Dawn, Spin Doctors, and others. The album raised $750,000 for music and dance scholarships (Berklee College of Music, the Juilliard School, and Dance Theatre of Harlem), administered by the United Negro College Fund.

In 1994 Kramer released a two-part video series, "Adventures in Modern Recording", utilizing interviews with Les Paul, the seminal guitarist as well as pioneer of both electric guitar development and modern recording techniques such as multi-tracking and looping. In the same year Kramer produced the Spin Doctors' single for Woodstock '94, as well as Buddy Guy's Slippin' In the 1995 Grammy winner for Best Blues Album and winner of the W.C. Handy Award for Album of the Year in 1996. Buddy Guy and the Saturday Nite Live Band with G.E. Smith, also produced by Kramer, was a 1996 Grammy nominee.

At the time of his death, Jimi Hendrix had a considerable backlog of material recorded in anticipation of future album releases. In a multimillion-dollar lawsuit which concluded in 1995, the heirs of Jimi Hendrix won back the rights to his voluminous recordings. Since then, Kramer has served as co-producer of all Hendrix releases.

Kramer produced a second Hendrix tribute album in 1995, In From the Storm. Its diverse artists' roster included the London Metropolitan Orchestra, Toots Thielemans, Carlos Santana, Robben Ford, Taj Mahal, Sting, Steve Vai, Buddy Miles, Brian May, and Bootsy Collins. In 1997 he produced Now, the third Paul Rodgers studio album.

He won a 1999 Grammy award for his audio production on the video for Jimi Hendrix's live album Band of Gypsys.

=== 2000s ===
Kramer collected another Grammy in 2002 for engineering a single entitled "The Game of Love", with Carlos Santana and vocal by Michelle Branch. The track also won a Grammy for Best Pop Collaboration with Vocals.

In 2003, Kramer mixed and produced the music soundtrack for the rock music documentary film Festival Express, featuring the Grateful Dead, Janis Joplin, the Band, Buddy Guy, Flying Burrito Brothers, and others.

In 2004, Kramer had several Hendrix-related projects, including helping DigiTech design and create an effects pedal which emulates characteristically Hendrixian guitar sounds. He also remastered Hendrix albums for Classic Vinyl, and remixed Woodstock, a posthumous live release, in 5.1 surround sound. Concerning his remastering work, Kramer told Guitar Player magazine, "I was able to really enhance and improve upon the actual sound, so if the original sound was good I was able to make it even better. I gave it a more full-bodied sound. I was able to improve some of the dynamics. Of course this is made possible by new technologies and equipment." Kramer specifically credited modern monitors, which provide abundant high-end detail, making it clear where various instruments are within the stereo image.

In 2005 Kramer reunited with architect John Storyk to design Anacapa Studios in Malibu, California. In the same year, Kramer remastered the Woodstock video footage of Jimi Hendrix for DVD release, revealing a fuller perspective of the guitarist's performance.

Again working with Digitech, Kramer helped design and create a Brian May guitar effects pedal in 2006. Also that year, galleries in Santa Monica, California, Hollywood, and Rotterdam exhibited Kramer's photographs of rock stars performing, recording, and in candid moments.

Gallery photographic exhibitions in 2007 included Santa Fe, New Mexico and Beverly Hills, California. Kramer also remixed "Evil Ways", a previously unreleased live Santana track from Woodstock, in 2007, for the 40th anniversary of Woodstock.

In 2008 Kramer mixed tracks for the Jimi Hendrix avatar (a character that a game player can use as an alter ego) Activision's Guitar Hero. He also engineered and mixed a 2008 album with Joey Santiago and Dave Lovering of the Pixies.

Kramer again exhibited photos in 2009, at the Morrison Hotel Gallery in Manhattan, as well as a newly opened branch Morrison Hotel Gallery in Del Mar, California. He was filmed and interviewed in 2009 for a BBC documentary about Sir George Martin, producer of all but one of the Beatles' album releases. In that same year he remixed the posthumously-released Band of Gypsys Live at the Fillmore East, along with albums by Jimi Hendrix, Janis Joplin, Santana, and Crosby, Stills and Nash.

Waves Audio, a producer of software for audio engineers, released the Eddie Kramer Collection in 2009, a set of five plug-ins for replicating Kramer's studio touch in recording guitar, drums, vocals, bass, and special effects.

=== 2010s–present ===
A 2010 exhibit at San Francisco Art Exchange displayed Kramer's photos of Hendrix and other rock luminaries. In 2010 he also remixed "Cheap Sunglasses", a re-make of a ZZ Top single by the Australian hard rock band Wolfmother, and in conjunction with John McDermott and the Hendrix family's organization, Experience Hendrix, Kramer prepared Valleys of Neptune, an album of previously unreleased Hendrix performances.

Kramer was chosen to be a presenter at the 2011 Grammy Technical Awards. Also in 2011 he recorded preeminent pedal steel blues/gospel guitarist Robert Randolph and the Family Band on the album Lickety Split, and Carlos Santana, a guest star on two of the album's tracks, as well as completing further mixes of Hendrix recordings in 5.1 Surround Sound. 2011 also saw the release of three more Kramer plug-ins for Wave, Kramer Master Tape, the Kramer HLS Channel, and the Kramer Pie Compressor.

In 2012 he did further sessions with Randolph, and Buddy Guy, and produced and engineered tracks for Acoustic Generations, a Hendrix tribute album featuring contemporary acoustic remakes of Hendrix songs. The project includes contributions from Brandi Carlile, Pearl Jam's Mike McCready, Jason Mraz, Grace Potter and the Nocturnals, Billy Gibbons, Rafael Saadiq, Heart, and Crosby and Nash.

Kramer's activities in 2013 included introducing three Eddie Kramer Signature guitar effects pedals from F-Pedals, with partner Francesco Sondelli at the NAMM Show, and also consulting with former Doors guitarist Robby Krieger on a new recording studio. Kramer also worked again with Robert Randolph in recording a "sacred steel" band for a 2013 release called Robert Randolph Presents: The Slide Brothers. 5 March 2013 was the release date of People, Hell and Angels, a collection of 12 songs which Jimi Hendrix had planned for his follow-up to Electric Ladyland, recorded in 1968–69, following the breakup of the Jimi Hendrix Experience. The backing musicians include Buddy Miles and Billy Cox, later to become Hendrix's Band of Gypsies, and Stephen Stills on bass. "Somewhere", a single released from the album, reached Number One on the Billboard Hot Singles Sales Chart. November 2013 saw the release of the Hendrix documentary Hear My Train A Comin', and another Hendrix live album, Miami Pop Festival.

Continuing his involvement with cutting-edge technologies, Kramer is working with Digital Theatre Systems (DTS) in the development of Headphone: X, an app which replicates 5.1, 7.1, and 11.1 Surround Sound in any type of headphone.

=== Significant collaborations ===
==== Jimi Hendrix ====
Kramer specifically cites Hendrix's strong individuality, powerful message, and expansion of the sonic vocabulary of electric guitar, including its potentials for controlled feedback and distortion.

Kramer recalls Hendrix as extremely disciplined in the studio, with his objectives thoroughly pre-planned. To some extent this was a result of working with results-oriented manager and early producer Chas Chandler, who brought Hendrix to England in September 1966, where he established his fame before returning to the United States. Hendrix envisioned the tonal spectrum as a palette of colors, often instructing Kramer with color-based commands. "Make it sound green," for example, was satisfied by adding reverb.

"Jimi utilized the studio as a rehearsal space, thank God he did." Kramer described Hendrix as "very sharp, very focused, very funny, very shy, totally dedicated to his music and his art. He was such a complete human being with such far-reaching intellect."

Kramer places Hendrix among Charlie Parker, Miles Davis, John Coltrane, and Louis Armstrong. "He really is in that league, because his individuality was so strong and his message was so strong and his mastery of his instrument was so complete. He was a maverick. He broke a lot of barriers, musically and in every way."

==== Led Zeppelin ====
Led Zeppelin II was the first of five albums which Kramer engineered for Led Zeppelin. It was mixed in a two-day marathon session. While working on the track "Whole Lotta Love", Kramer hit a spot where part of a previously recorded vocal track kept bleeding through, in which a screaming Robert Plant intones "Woman. You need it!" Instinctively, Kramer added reverb to the passage, just as Jimmy Page had done. They glanced at each other and laughed. Page then said "Leave it in."

==== Kiss ====
In June 1973, a group of struggling rock musicians whose previous band, Wicked Lester, had flamed out, cut a five-song demo as Kiss with Kramer at Electric Lady Studios. Within two months they had a contract with Casablanca Records. By late 1975, Kiss had a reputation for exciting stagecraft but lackluster album sales. They asked Kramer to produce their daring release of a 2-disc live album, Alive!. It subsequently reached gold status, then platinum, and multi-platinum, and generated the group's first hit single, "Rock and Roll All Nite". This not only buoyed the group, it probably staved off a bankruptcy filing by their struggling label, and Kramer produced five more albums for the band that went platinum.

==== The Rolling Stones ====
Kramer was assistant engineer on Between the Buttons, Flowers, and Their Satanic Majesties Request. The work which he and producer Jimmy Miller had done with Traffic moved the Stones to book the pair for Beggars Banquet, their first album recorded without Andrew Loog Oldham, the group's former manager and producer. Beggars Banquet re-asserted the group's R&B roots. According to Kramer, Miller did much to position the Rolling Stones for the longevity which they have since enjoyed: "He went to the heart and soul of where they came from; he was so adept at evoking the psyche of the band, and so clever at production. I've always tried to model myself after Jimmy in terms of how to get a session going, how to make the artists really get excited about what they're playing."

==== The Beatles ====
Kramer and his cohorts at Olympic Studios caught a break when the Beatles' customary recording facility at EMI Studios (now Abbey Road Studios) was unavailable on 11 May 1967, when the Beatles wished to record "Baby, You're a Rich Man". Olympic was frantic to create a strong impression. By good fortune they happened to have a Clavioline, an early synthesizer, on hand. Lennon was fascinated by the instrument. He improvised droning, Indian-sounding passages to weave among the song's verses. Olympic was subsequently chosen for the 14 June recording of "All You Need Is Love". The songs comprised a two-sided Summer of 1967 Beatles' hit. "They were so disarming and so great in the studio," Kramer recalls, "very targeted about what they'd come in to achieve."

== Production credits ==
Selected production credits:

- 1970: Buzzy Linhart – MUSIC
- 1971: Carly Simon – Carly Simon
- 1971: Jimi Hendrix – The Cry of Love
- 1972: NRBQ – Scraps
- 1973: NRBQ – Workshop
- 1973: Jobriath – Jobriath
- 1973: Stories – About Us
- 1974: Jobriath – Creatures of the Street
- 1974: Spooky Tooth – The Mirror
- 1975: Kiss – Alive!
- 1976: Kiss – Rock and Roll Over
- 1976: Mott – Shouting and Pointing
- 1977: April Wine – Live at the El Mocambo
- 1977: Kiss – Love Gun
- 1977: Kiss – Alive II
- 1977: Angel – On Earth As It Is In Heaven
- 1977: Brownsville Station – Brownsville Station
- 1978: Ace Frehley – Kiss – Ace Frehley
- 1978: Foghat – Stone Blue
- 1979: Twisted Sister – I'll Never Grow Up, Now! (single)
- 1981: Michael Stanley Band – North Coast
- 1982: Peter Frampton – The Art of Control
- 1983: Fastway – Fastway
- 1983: Whitesnake – Guilty of Love (single)
- 1984: Triumph – Thunder Seven
- 1983: NRBQ – Tapdancin' Bats
- 1985: Alcatrazz – Disturbing the Peace
- 1985: Icon – Night of the Crime
- 1986: Raven – The Pack Is Back
- 1986: TT Quick – Metal of Honor
- 1987: Pretty Maids – Future World
- 1987: Anthrax – Among the Living
- 1987: Ace Frehley – Frehley's Comet
- 1987: Kings of the Sun – Kings of the Sun
- 1987: Loudness – Hurricane Eyes
- 1987: Fastway – Trick or Treat
- 1989: Ace Frehley – Trouble Walkin'
- 1990: Robin Trower – In the Line of Fire
- 1991: The Scream – Let It Scream
- 1993: The Power Trio From Hell – American Man
- 1993: Kiss – Alive III
- 1994: Buddy Guy – Slippin' In
- 1995: John McLaughlin – Promise
- 1996: Carl Perkins – Go Cat Go!
- 1996: Buddy Guy – Live: The Real Deal
- 1998: Brian May – Another World
- 2007: Lez Zeppelin – Lez Zeppelin
- 2009: The Everybody – Avatar
- 2010: Claire Stahlecker Band – Never Stop Lovin' You
- 2011: Michael Williams Band – Fire Red
- 2012: Barón Rojo – Tommy Barón
- 2014: American Fiction – Dumb Luck
- 2014: Última Experiencia – Kramer Sessions

== Engineering credits ==
Selected engineering credits:

- 1967: Jimi Hendrix – Are You Experienced
- 1967: Jimi Hendrix – Axis: Bold as Love
- 1967: Traffic – Mr. Fantasy
- 1968: Jimi Hendrix – Electric Ladyland
- 1968: Graham Gouldman – The Graham Gouldman Thing
- 1968: Family – Music in a Doll's House
- 1968: Blue Cheer – Outsideinside
- 1968: Traffic – Traffic
- 1969: John Mayall – Empty Rooms
- 1969: Led Zeppelin – Led Zeppelin II
- 1969: The Nice – Nice
- 1969: The Nice – Live at the Fillmore East December 1969
- 1969: Woodstock Live (3 record set)
- 1969: John Mayall – The Turning Point
- 1970: Jimi Hendrix – Band of Gypsys
- 1970: Buzzy Linhart – MUSIC
- 1970: The Nice – Five Bridges
- 1971: Larry Coryell – Barefoot Boy
- 1971: Curtis Mayfield – Curtis/Live!
- 1971: John Sebastian – Four of Us
- 1971: Humble Pie – Performance Rockin' the Fillmore
- 1972: John Mayall – Jazz Blues Fusion
- 1972: Led Zeppelin – How the West Was Won
- 1973: Peter Frampton – Frampton's Camel
- 1973: Led Zeppelin – Houses of the Holy
- 1973: Derek and the Dominos – In Concert
- 1975: Led Zeppelin – Physical Graffiti
- 1976: Peter Frampton – Frampton Comes Alive!
- 1976: The Rolling Stones – Love You Live
- 1982: Led Zeppelin – Coda
- 1988: Kings of the Sun – Self Titled
- 1991: The Power Trio From Hell – American Man
- 2006: Hangface – Freakshow
- 2007: Shery – Continuamente (in album El Amor es un Fantasma)
- 2007: Francesco Sondelli – Disordinary
- 2007: Lez Zeppelin – Lez Zeppelin
- 2010: Claire Stahlecker Band – Never Stop Lovin' You
- 2011: Michael Williams Band – Fire Red
- 2014: American Fiction – Dumb Luck
