= Matt Johnson (keyboardist) =

British keyboardist (born 1969)

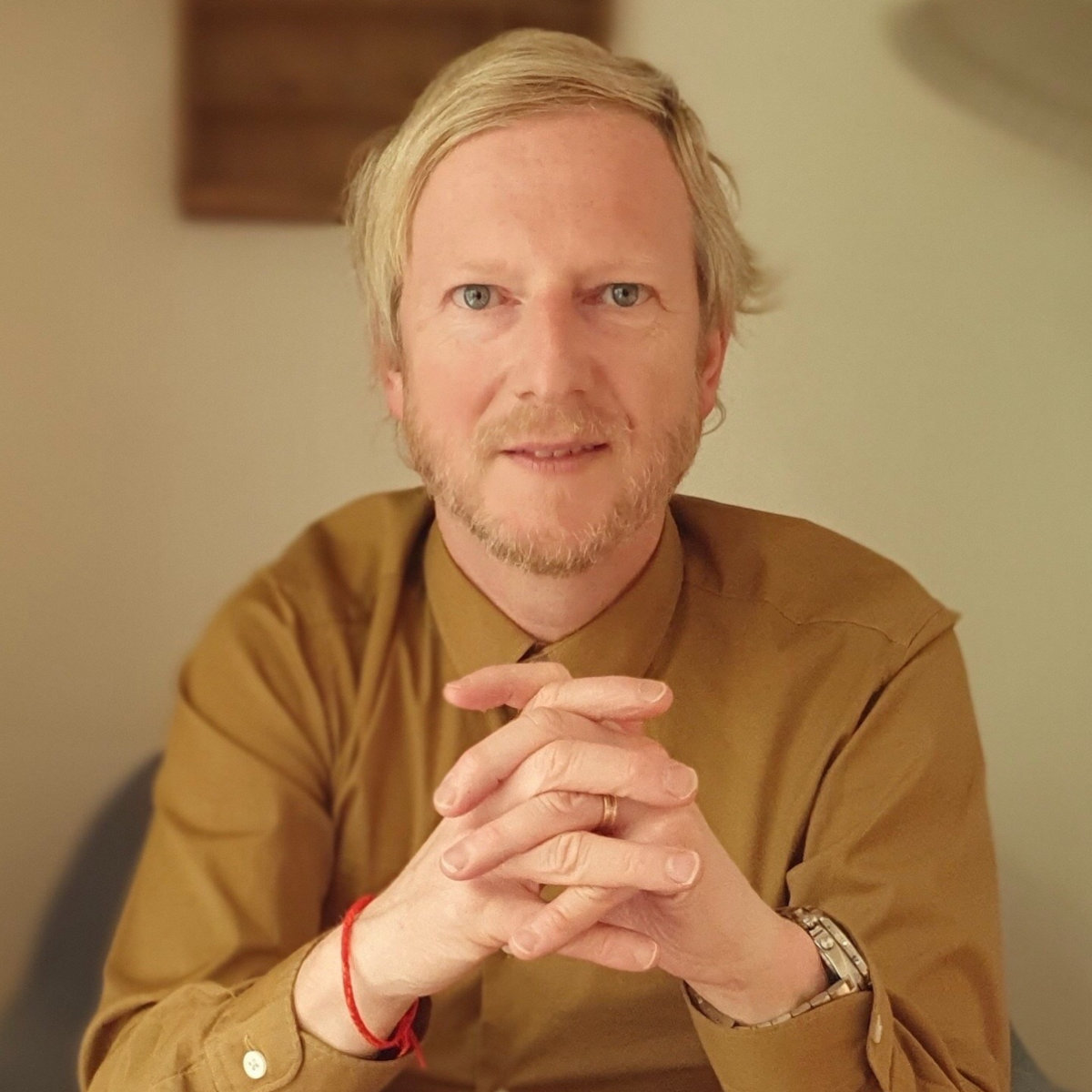

Background information
- Born: Matthew Richard Johnson; 3 February 1969 (age 57); London, England, United Kingdom
- Origin: Bournemouth, England
- Genres: Funk; acid jazz; pop
- Occupations: Musician; songwriter
- Instrument: Keyboard
- Years active: 1990s–present

Matthew Johnson (born 3 February 1969 in London) is a British keyboardist who plays for the funk and jazz band Jamiroquai.

== Biography ==
Johnson was aged one and a half when he started playing the piano at his family home. "My dad was a musician, so there was always music playing in the house; but I remember being taught by a scary old piano teacher, who must have been over 90 years old". His influences range from Herbie Hancock and Miles Davis through to Squarepusher.

Before playing in Jamiroquai, Johnson was a writer and performer for bands Sunray—with whom Kym Mazelle recorded a cover of "Perhaps"—and Nu Hope. He has also written and produced songs for artists such as Alexia, who had a minor hit with "Ring".

His route into Jamiroquai was via an audition in 2002. He was recommended by Simon Katz, a previous Jamiroquai guitarist, and Derrick McKenzie gave him the call. The audition was a success, and Matt became a songwriter and member of Jamiroquai.

He joined Jamiroquai on 2 May 2002, replacing the founding member Toby Smith as keyboardist.

Johnson has also had a stint as the chief songwriting partner and producer—along with a Jamiroquai bandmate, guitarist Rob Harris—for singer-songwriter Julian Perretta, helping him create his debut album, Stitch Me Up, which was released in 2010.

Johnson produced and co-wrote songs for the group's 2017 album, Automaton, with bandmate Jay Kay. He also produced Jon Regen's 2019 album Higher Ground. In July 2020, he released three singles—"With The Music", “ZOOM”, and “Sunshine”—to promote his new album, With the Music, which was released on 18 July 2020 in Japan, followed by a worldwide release two days later.

Sound on Sound magazine website described Johnson as "one of the most talented and prolific keyboard players of the last 20 years" in April 2022.

In June 2025, Johnson released the album Warrior Princess.

== Discography ==
Solo Studio Albums:

- With The Music (2020)
- Warrior Princess (2025)

Jamiroquai Studio Albums:

- Dynamite (2005)
- Rock Dust Light Star (2010)
- Automaton (2017)

== Personal life ==
Johnson married Tanya Burke on 18 July 2006.
