= How Did We Get Here? World Tour =

2026 concert tour by Louis Tomlinson

- Tour by Louis Tomlinson
- Promotional poster
- Location: Asia; Europe; North America; Oceania
- Associated album: How Did I Get Here?
- Start date: 23 March 2026
- End date: 24 October 2026
- No. of shows: 60
- Supporting acts: The Aces; the Beaches; Pale Waves; Picture Parlour; The Royston Club; ADMT; Alex Spencer

Louis Tomlinson concert chronology
- Faith in the Future World Tour (2023–24); How Did We Get Here? World Tour (2026)

The How Did We Get Here? World Tour was the third concert tour by the English singer-songwriter Louis Tomlinson, launching in support of his third studio album How Did I Get Here? (2026). The tour commenced in Hamburg, Germany, on 23 March 2026 and concluded on 24 October 2026 in Brisbane, Australia.

== Announcements ==
On 30 September 2025, Tomlinson announced his third studio album titled How Did I Get Here? scheduled to be released on 23 January 2026. Alongside the announcement he released the first single of the album on the same day titled "Lemonade". A day later, on 1 October 2025, Tomlinson announced the tour in support of the album titled "How Did We Get Here? World Tour" scheduled to take place in Europe and North America from March through July 2026. Presale tickets go on sale from 8 October 2025 with the general sale taking place on 10 October. On 24 March 2026, an Australian leg of the tour was announced, promoted by Untitled Group. On 15 July 2026, Tomlinson announced an Asian leg of the tour which will take place before the Australian leg in October.

== Set list ==
This set list was taken from the European leg. It does not represent all shows throughout the tour.

1. "Lemonade"
2. "On Fire"
3. "Written All Over Your Face"
4. "Out of My System"
5. "Bigger Than Me"
6. "Saturdays"
7. "Dark to Light"
8. "Broken Bones"
9. "Defenceless"
10. "Just Hold On"
11. "Lazy"
12. "Sunflowers"
13. "Lucid"
14. "Jump the Gun"
15. "Imposter"
16. "Lucky Again"
17. "Sanity"
18. "Kill My Mind"
19. "Face the Music"
20. "Silver Tongues"
21. "The Observer"

Encore

22. "The Answer"
23. "Miss You"
24. "Palaces"

== Tour dates ==
List of 2026 concerts
Date (2026)	City	Country	Venue	Supporting acts
23 March	Hamburg	Germany	Barclays Arena	Alex Spencer; Pale Waves
25 March	Fornebu (Note: Promoted as in promotional material.)	Norway	Unity Arena	Alex Spencer; Pale Waves
27 March	Helsinki	Finland	Veikkaus Arena	Alex Spencer; Pale Waves
29 March	Stockholm	Sweden	Avicii Arena	Alex Spencer; Pale Waves
30 March	Copenhagen	Denmark	K.B. Hallen	Alex Spencer; Pale Waves
1 April	Berlin	Germany	Uber Arena	Alex Spencer; Pale Waves
2 April	Cologne	Germany	Lanxess Arena	Alex Spencer; Pale Waves
4 April	Gliwice	Poland	Gliwice Arena	Alex Spencer; Pale Waves
5 April	Prague	Czech Republic	O_{2} Arena	Alex Spencer; Pale Waves
6 April	Vienna	Austria	Marx Halle	Alex Spencer; Pale Waves
9 April	Casalecchio di Reno (Note: Promoted as Bologna in promotional material.)	Italy	Unipol Arena	ADMT; Pale Waves
10 April	Assago (Note: Promoted as Milan in promotional material.)	Italy	Unipol Forum	ADMT; Pale Waves
12 April	Barcelona	Spain	Palau Sant Jordi	ADMT; Pale Waves
13 April	Madrid	Spain	Movistar Arena	ADMT; Pale Waves
15 April	Décines-Charpieu (Note: Promoted as Lyon in promotional material.)	France	LDLC Arena	ADMT; Pale Waves
17 April	Munich	Germany	Olympiahalle	ADMT; Pale Waves
19 April	Antwerp	Belgium	Lotto Arena	ADMT; Pale Waves
20 April	Amsterdam	Netherlands	Ziggo Dome	ADMT; Pale Waves
21 April	Paris	France	Accor Arena	ADMT; Pale Waves
24 April	Manchester	England	Co-op Live	ADMT; Pale Waves
25 April	Birmingham	England	Utilita Arena	ADMT; Pale Waves
27 April	Glasgow	Scotland	OVO Hydro	ADMT; Pale Waves
28 April	Leeds	England	First Direct Bank Arena	ADMT; Pale Waves
30 April	Dublin	Ireland	3Arena	ADMT; Pale Waves
2 May	Brighton	England	Brighton Centre	ADMT; Pale Waves
3 May	London	England	The O_{2} Arena	ADMT; Pale Waves
3 June	Vancouver	Canada	Pacific Coliseum	The Aces
4 June	Seattle	United States	Climate Pledge Arena	The Aces
6 June	San Francisco	United States	Bill Graham Civic Auditorium	The Royston Club; The Aces
10 June	San Diego	United States	The Rady Shell	The Royston Club; The Aces
11 June	Los Angeles	United States	Crypto.com Arena	The Royston Club; The Aces
13 June	Las Vegas	United States	Resorts World Theatre	The Royston Club; The Aces
14 June	Phoenix	United States	Mortgage Matchup Center	The Royston Club; The Aces
19 June	Morrison (Note: Promoted as Denver in promotional material.)	United States	Red Rocks Amphitheatre	The Royston Club; The Aces
21 June	Fort Worth	United States	Dickies Arena	The Royston Club; The Aces
22 June	Austin	United States	Moody Center	The Royston Club; The Aces
25 June	Minneapolis	United States	Minneapolis Armory	Picture Parlour; The Aces
27 June	St. Louis	United States	Chaifetz Arena	Picture Parlour; The Aces
29 June	Nashville	United States	The Pinnacle	Picture Parlour; The Beaches
2 July	Independence	United States	Cable Dahmer Arena	Picture Parlour; The Beaches
3 July	Rosemont (Note: Promoted as Chicago in promotional material.)	United States	Allstate Arena	Picture Parlour; The Beaches
5 July	Charlotte	United States	Spectrum Center	Picture Parlour; The Beaches
7 July	Washington, D.C.	United States	The Anthem	Picture Parlour; The Beaches
8 July	New York City	United States	Madison Square Garden	Picture Parlour; The Beaches
10 July	Pittsburgh	United States	Stage AE	Picture Parlour; The Beaches
11 July	Philadelphia	United States	Skyline Stage	Picture Parlour; The Beaches
14 July	Boston	United States	TD Garden	Picture Parlour; The Beaches
16 July	Montreal	Canada	Bell Centre	Picture Parlour; The Aces
17 July	Toronto	Canada	Scotiabank Arena	Picture Parlour; The Aces
18 July	Detroit	United States	Masonic Temple Theatre	Picture Parlour; The Beaches
20 July	Cleveland	United States	Jacobs Pavilion	Picture Parlour; The Beaches
22 July	Atlanta	United States	State Farm Arena	Picture Parlour; The Beaches
23 July	Orlando	United States	Addition Financial Arena	Picture Parlour; The Beaches
24 July	Miami	United States	Kaseya Center	Picture Parlour; The Beaches
13 October	Osaka	Japan	Zepp Namba	—N/a
15 October	Tokyo	Japan	Toyosu Pit	—N/a
17 October	Quezon City (Note: Promoted as Manila in promotional material.)	Philippines	Smart Araneta Coliseum	—N/a
20 October	Melbourne	Australia	John Cain Arena	—N/a
22 October	Sydney	Australia	Hordern Pavilion (Note: The Show on 22 October was relocated from Afterpay Arena.)	—N/a
24 October	Brisbane	Australia	Riverstage (Note: The Show on 24 October was relocated from Brisbane Entertainment Centre.)	—N/a
