= Bigger Than Me =

Bigger Than Me may refer to:

- "Bigger Than Me" (Bell X1 song), 2005
- "Bigger Than Me" (Louis Tomlinson song), 2022
- "Bigger Than Me", a 2017 song by Big Sean from I Decided
- "Bigger Than Me", a 2014 song by the Game from Blood Moon: Year of the Wolf
- "Bigger Than Me", a 2021 song by Gretta Ray
- "Bigger Than Me", a 2017 song by Katy Perry from Witness
- "Bigger Than Me", a 2022 song by Louis Tomlinson from Faith in the Future
- Bigger Than Me, an unreleased album by Kirko Bangz
- Bigger Than Me, a 2005 album by Aselin Debison
- Bigger Than Me, a 2017 album by Le'Andria Johnson
