= Live (Louis Tomlinson album) =

2024 live album by Louis Tomlinson

Live album by Louis Tomlinson
- Released: 25 April 2024
- Length: 59:17
- Label: 78; BMG

Louis Tomlinson chronology
Faith in the Future (2022)	Live (2024)	How Did I Get Here? (2026)

Live is the first live album by the English singer-songwriter Louis Tomlinson. It was a surprise album, released for streaming and digital download on 25 April 2024. It was issued physically on 23 August 2024. Recorded during the Louis Tomlinson World Tour and Faith in the Future World Tour, which he embarked on to support his first two studio albums, Walls (2020) and Faith in the Future (2022), the live album consists of songs and performances on various dates.

== Background and release ==
On 23 April 2024, Tomlinson shared a link on social media while writing "pre-save", without confirming an album release. The singer later stated that specific locations would be sent a surprise by email to complete a puzzle, which contained the titles of the songs that later appeared on the track listing. While surprise-releasing Live, on 25 April, Tomlinson said: "I've been lucky enough to spend the last 3 years touring the world twice over, the feeling I get sharing those live moments will be with me forever. This record is a true collaboration between me and you. Thank you for the amazing memories".

His first live album contains 15 songs recorded live across 15 shows in 15 different cities, including London, Nashville, Vancouver and Barcelona. They were recorded throughout two concert tours, the Louis Tomlinson World Tour and the Faith in the Future World Tour, which Tomlinson embarked between 2020 and 2023. Live was released through digital download and streaming on 25 April 2024, while the physical editions of the album, including a double CD and 2 LP picture disc vinyl, were released on 23 August 2024. To support the release, accompanying video clips of compiled tour footage were shared on Tomlinson's social media accounts.

== Critical reception ==
Professional ratings
Review scores
Source	Rating
Clash	8/10
Euphoria	5/5 stars

In a positive review for Clash, Josh Abraham described Live as a "emotional rollercoaster that keeps fans wanting more", highlighted "We Made It" and "Common People" as standouts, and said that the theme of the album is "the appreciation of what the artist has through music". He also added: "'Get as loud as you can' is shouted from [Tomlinson] on multiple tracks, which is exactly what every lover of his music is doing as they rundown the tracklist".

== Track listing ==
Live track listing
No.	Title	Length
1.	"The Greatest"	3:48
2.	"Face the Music"	2:50
3.	"Bigger Than Me"	3:45
4.	"Holding on to Heartache"	4:04
5.	"We Made It"	3:29
6.	"Chicago"	3:58
7.	"Fearless"	5:37
8.	"Common People"	2:48
9.	"All This Time / She Is Beauty We Are World Class"	8:29
10.	"Walls"	3:55
11.	"Written All Over Your Face"	2:48
12.	"Out of My System"	3:38
13.	"Saturdays"	5:56
14.	"Silver Tongues"	4:08
Total length:		59:17

== Charts ==
Chart performance for Live
Chart (2024)	Peak position
Australian Albums (ARIA)	45
Austrian Albums (Ö3 Austria)	4
Belgian Albums (Ultratop Flanders)	26
Belgian Albums (Ultratop Wallonia)	38
Dutch Albums (Album Top 100)	8
French Physical Albums (SNEP)	70
German Albums (Offizielle Top 100)	4
Italian Albums (FIMI)	22
Polish Albums (ZPAV)	34
Portuguese Albums (AFP)	55
Scottish Albums (OCC)	4
Spanish Albums (PROMUSICAE)	12
Swedish Physical Albums (Sverigetopplistan)	4
Swiss Albums (Schweizer Hitparade)	87
UK Albums (OCC)	33
UK Independent Albums (OCC)	3
US Top Album Sales (Billboard)	17
