= Lemonade (Louis Tomlinson song) =

Single by Louis Tomlinson

from the album How Did I Get Here?
- B-side: "Sleepwalking (Demo)"
- Released: 30 September 2025
- Genre: Psychedelic pop; funk rock
- Length: 2:39
- Label: BMG
- Songwriters: Theo Hutchcraft; Nico Rebscher; David Sneddon; Louis Tomlinson

Louis Tomlinson singles chronology
"Silver Tongues" (2022)	"Lemonade" (2025)	"Palaces" (2025)

Music video
- "Lemonade" on YouTube

"Lemonade" is a song by English singer–songwriter Louis Tomlinson from his album How Did I Get Here? It was released on 30 September 2025 as the album's lead single.

== Background and production ==
The song was written by Theo Hutchcraft, David Sneddon, Nico Rebscher, and Tomlinson. In discussing the single, Tomlinson said he wanted the track to open the new era with an energetic and ambitious sound. He described it as a lively blend of funk-inspired guitar, bright keyboard lines and natural percussion, which he felt made it an ideal introduction to the project. It is his first musical project since Live (2024).

== Release ==
Tomlinson announced the release of the song on 23 September with a 15-second teaser. The lead single of Tomlinson's third studio album How Did I Get Here?, it debuted on BBC Radio 1 on 30 September 2025.

== Music video ==
The music video for the song was released on 13 October. It follows Tomlinson being bothered in a photoshoot while outside of a car, and then falling asleep. He falls into a fever dream and is surrounded by people wearing yellow bodysuits. The people and Tomlinson watch a sock puppet open a lemonade stand, and dance around a lemon farm. Tomlinson then dives inside a swimming pool while fully clothed, ending the trance.

== Reception ==
Robin Murray for Clash rated the single 8/10, describing "Lemonade" as a bold and energetic pop single built on "big riffs" and choruses suited for arenas.

== Charts ==
=== Weekly charts ===
Weekly chart performance
Chart (2025–2026)	Peak position
Argentina Anglo Airplay (Monitor Latino)	8
Central America Anglo Airplay (Monitor Latino)	9
Chile Anglo Airplay (Monitor Latino)	10
Costa Rica Anglo Airplay (Monitor Latino)	10
Czech Republic Airplay (ČNS IFPI)	61
Dominican Republic Anglo Airplay (Monitor Latino)	5
Ecuador Anglo Airplay (Monitor Latino)	16
Estonia Airplay (TopHit)	45
Germany Airplay (BVMI)	82
Italy Airplay (EarOne)	29
Latin America Anglo Airplay (Monitor Latino)	14
Lithuania Airplay (TopHit)	27
Panama Anglo Airplay (Monitor Latino)	3
Paraguay Airplay (Monitor Latino)	8
UK Singles (OCC)	89
UK Indie (OCC)	29
Uruguay Anglo Airplay (Monitor Latino)	3
US Pop Airplay (Billboard)	33

=== Monthly charts ===
Monthly chart performance
Chart (2025)	Peak position
Estonia Airplay (TopHit)	50
Lithuania Airplay (TopHit)	31
Paraguay Airplay (SGP)	59
