= How Did I Get Here? =

Studio album by Louis Tomlinson
- Released: 23 January 2026
- Recorded: 2025
- Genres: Psychedelic pop; funk rock; synth pop; indie rock
- Length: 36:41
- Label: BMG
- Producers: Joseph Cross; Nicolas Rebscher; Mathias Wang

Louis Tomlinson chronology
Live (2024)	How Did I Get Here? (2026)

Singles from How Did I Get Here?
- 1. "Lemonade" Released: 30 September 2025; 2. "Palaces" Released: 13 November 2025; 3. "Imposter" Released: 20 January 2026

How Did I Get Here? is the third studio album by the English singer-songwriter Louis Tomlinson. It was released on 23 January 2026 through BMG Rights Management. Cryptic posters were found in several cities around the world to begin promotion of the album. The first single, "Lemonade", was released on 30 September 2025. The album is notably thematically lighter than his previous record, Faith in the Future (2022), and took inspiration from a trip to Santa Teresa, Costa Rica.

== Background and production ==
How Did I Get Here? is Tomlinson's third studio album and follows Faith in the Future (2022). In January 2024, he said that he had "started drawing the outline in [his] head". In April 2025, Tomlinson described the album as "sunny". In May, Tomlinson posted a photograph of him inside a recording studio in front of a microphone. By July 2025, the album was finished.

The album drew inspiration from Tomlinson's 2025 visit to Santa Teresa, Costa Rica. In addition to Costa Rica, parts of the album were recorded in Los Angeles and England. It was co-produced with Nico Rebscher. Tomlinson described the album as "the record [he] always deserved to make". Tomlinson will commence on the How Did We Get Here? World Tour in 2026 to support the album. Describing the album, Tomlinson stated it was thematically more lighthearted that his previous record.

== Release and promotion ==
On 16 September 2025, Tomlinson released a website, "louis-lemonade.com", and posters bearing the words "Louis' Lemonade" were found around the world in cities, including in Soho. The first single for the album, "Lemonade", was released on 30 September 2025. Tomlinson announced the release on 23 September through a 15-second snippet posted to social media. The album was released on 23 January 2026.

The second single for the album, "Palaces", was released on 13 November 2025. A "punchy and anthemic slice of guitar-led pop", Tomlinson describes it as "one of my favourite songs on the record since writing it."

The third and final single for the album, "Imposter", was released on 20 January 2026. A "melodic indie-pop" song with "a lively bassline and gritty guitars", the song revolves around Tomlinson's struggles with Imposter syndrome and self-worth, with Tomlinson stating that the song is "probably the most melodic moment on the record".

== Critical reception ==
Professional ratings
Aggregate scores
Source	Rating
AnyDecentMusic?	6.5/10
Metacritic	69/100
Review scores
Source	Rating
AllMusic	4/5 stars
Beats Per Minute	75%
Clash	8/10
Cryptic Rock	5/5 stars
Euphoria	4/5 stars
The Independent	3/5 stars
The Irish Times	3/5 stars
PopMatters	7/10
Rolling Stone	4/5 stars
The Times	2/5 stars

How Did I Get Here? was met with generally positive reviews from music critics. At Metacritic, which assigns a normalised rating out of 100 to reviews from professional publications, the album received an average score of 69, based on eight reviews, while the review aggregator site AnyDecentMusic? compiled eleven reviews and gave the album an average of 6.3 out of 10, based on their assessment of the critical consensus.

Neil Z. Yeung of AllMusic described the record as "a highly enjoyable and feel-good experience that is fit for lounging around on a warm weather day before heating things up on a sweaty summer night." He also noted the "sizeable shift in tone and emotion" from his previous album Faith in the Future. Will Richards for Rolling Stone rated it 4/5, calling the album "bright and bold". Shannon Garner of Clash said that the album "finds its strength in cohesion, shaped by an artist confident enough to sit with complexity rather than rush toward resolution, and who understands that growth can be quiet, deliberate, and deeply personal."

Helen Brown of The Independent wrote, "The easygoing Doncaster lad got a little lost in his attempts to reinvent himself with an indie sound that he never totally inhabited. But his third solo album [...] finds the 34-year-old sounding more confident mixing those indie guitar influences into a sunnier, springier, synthier poptimism." Ed Power for The Irish Times called the album "thumpingly okayish", rating it 3/5 stars and describing it as influenced by Oasis and Ed Sheeran.

In a negative review, Will Hodgkinson for The Times criticised the "inoffensive but bland" nature of the album, giving it a final rating of 2/5 stars.

== Track listing ==
Standard edition
No.	Title	Writer(s)	Producer(s)	Length
1.	"Lemonade"	Louis Tomlinson; Theo Hutchcraft; Nicolas Rebscher; David Sneddon	Joseph Cross	2:37^{[a]}
2.	"On Fire"	Tomlinson; Joseph Cross; Hutchcraft; Sneddon	Rebscher; Cross	2:48
3.	"Sunflowers"	Tomlinson; Hutchcraft; Jamie Scott; Mathias Wang	Rebscher; Mathi Wang	3:59
4.	"Lazy"	Tomlinson; Hutchcraft; Scott; Wang	Rebscher; Wang	2:22
5.	"Palaces"	Tomlinson; Hutchcraft; Rebscher	Rebscher	2:47
6.	"Last Night"	Tomlinson; Robert Harvey; Rebscher	Rebscher	2:48
7.	"Broken Bones"	Tomlinson; Harvey; Rebscher	Rebscher	2:58
8.	"Dark to Light"	Tomlinson; Dave Gibson; Rebscher	Rebscher	3:12
9.	"Imposter"	Tomlinson; Gibson; Rebscher	Rebscher	2:38
10.	"Sanity"	Tomlinson; Hutchcraft; Wang	Rebscher; Wang	3:08
11.	"Jump the Gun"	Tomlinson; Gibson; Rebscher	Rebscher	2:58
12.	"Lucid"	Tomlinson; Cross; Hutchcraft; Sneddon	Rebscher; Cross	4:26
Total length:				36:41

Extended edition (disc 2)
No.	Title	Writer(s)	Producer(s)	Length
1.	"The Observer"	Tomlinson; Hutchcraft; Cross; Sneddon	Cross; Rebscher	2:50
2.	"The Answer"	Tomlinson; Hutchcraft; Rebscher	Rebscher	2:04
3.	"All These Skies"	Louis Tomlinson; Jamie Scott; Mathias Wang; Theo Hutchcraft		2:56
4.	"Send Me Under" (demo)	Tomlinson; Cross; Sneddon; Hutchcraft	Cross	2:18
5.	"Side by Side" (demo)	Tomlinson; Rebscher; Hutchcraft; Sneddon	Rebscher	3:29
6.	"The Spark" (demo)	Tomlinson; Rebscher; Hutchcraft; Sneddon	Rebscher	2:08
7.	"Sleepwalking" (demo)			2:42
8.	"Looks like Lucy" (demo)			3:22
9.	"Save Me Time" (demo)			3:42
Total length:				25:31

=== Notes ===
- ^{^[a]} On the physical releases of the album, "Lemonade" features an additional intro, and the track lasts 3:10.
- "The Observer" and "The Answer" were originally released as bonus tracks for the physical deluxe edition of the album.
- "All These Skies" was originally released as a bonus track for the versions of the album with the alternative cover.
- Demo versions of "Send Me Under", "Side by Side" and "The Spark" were originally released as bonus tracks for the digital deluxe edition of the album.
- Demo versions of "Sleepwalking", "Looks Like Lucy" and "Save Me Time" were originally released as b-sides for the CD versions of singles "Lemonade", "Palaces" and "Imposter" respectively.

== Personnel ==
Credits adapted from Tidal.

=== Musicians ===
- Louis Tomlinson – lead vocals, backing vocals (all tracks); percussion (track 1)
- Nicolas Rebscher – keyboards (all tracks), guitar (1–3, 5–9, 11, 12), backing vocals (1, 2, 5–12), bass (1, 5), percussion (2–4, 6–12), drums (5)
- Alexander Grube – bass
- Michael Blackwell – guitar
- Theo Hutchcraft – backing vocals (1–5, 10, 12), percussion (1, 5)
- Jamie Houghton – drums (1–4, 6–12)
- David Sneddon – keyboards (1, 2, 12), backing vocals (1, 12), percussion (1)
- Dan Grech-Marguerat – additional programming (2, 3, 5, 6, 9, 10)
- Joseph Cross – guitar, keyboards, programming (2, 12)
- Mathi Wang – guitar, keyboards, percussion (3, 4, 10); backing vocals (3, 9, 10)
- Jamie Scott – backing vocals, bass (3, 4)
- Rob Harvey – backing vocals (6, 7)
- Dave Gibson – backing vocals (8), acoustic guitar (9)
- Jakob Schneck – backing vocals (12)
- Teodora Špirić – backing vocals (12)
- Thomas Thurner – backing vocals (12)

=== Technical ===
- George Chung – engineering
- Nicolas Rebscher – engineering
- Dan Grech-Marguerat – engineering (1–3, 5, 6, 9, 10)
- Joseph Cross – engineering (2, 12)
- Sascha "Busy" Bühren – engineering (2–12)
- Luke Gibbs – engineering (2–5, 12)
- Ryan Curtis – engineering (2, 5, 6)
- Mathi Wang – engineering (3, 4, 10)
- Charles Haydon Hicks – engineering (4, 7, 8, 11, 12)
- Luke Burgoyne – mixing assistance (1–3, 5, 6, 9, 10)
- Seb Maletka-Catala – mixing assistance (1–3, 5, 6, 9, 10)

== Charts ==
Chart performance for How Did I Get Here?
Chart (2026)	Peak position
Australian Albums (ARIA)	3
Austrian Albums (Ö3 Austria)	2
Belgian Albums (Ultratop Flanders)	1
Belgian Albums (Ultratop Wallonia)	2
Danish Albums (Hitlisten)	15
Dutch Albums (Album Top 100)	1
Finnish Albums (Suomen virallinen lista)	3
French Albums (SNEP)	5
German Albums (Offizielle Top 100)	2
German Pop Albums (Offizielle Top 100)	2
Greek Albums (IFPI)	52
Hungarian Albums (MAHASZ)	36
Irish Albums (Official Charts)	15
Irish Independent Albums (IRMA)	3
Italian Albums (FIMI)	2
New Zealand Albums (RMNZ)	16
Norwegian Albums (IFPI Norge)	47
Polish Albums (ZPAV)	3
Portuguese Albums (AFP)	7
Scottish Albums (Official Charts)	2
Spanish Albums (Promusicae)	1
Swedish Albums (Sverigetopplistan)	8
Swiss Albums (Schweizer Hitparade)	2
UK Albums (Official Charts)	1
UK Independent Albums (Official Charts)	1
US Billboard 200	16
US Independent Albums (Billboard)	3
