= ADMT =

British pop musician

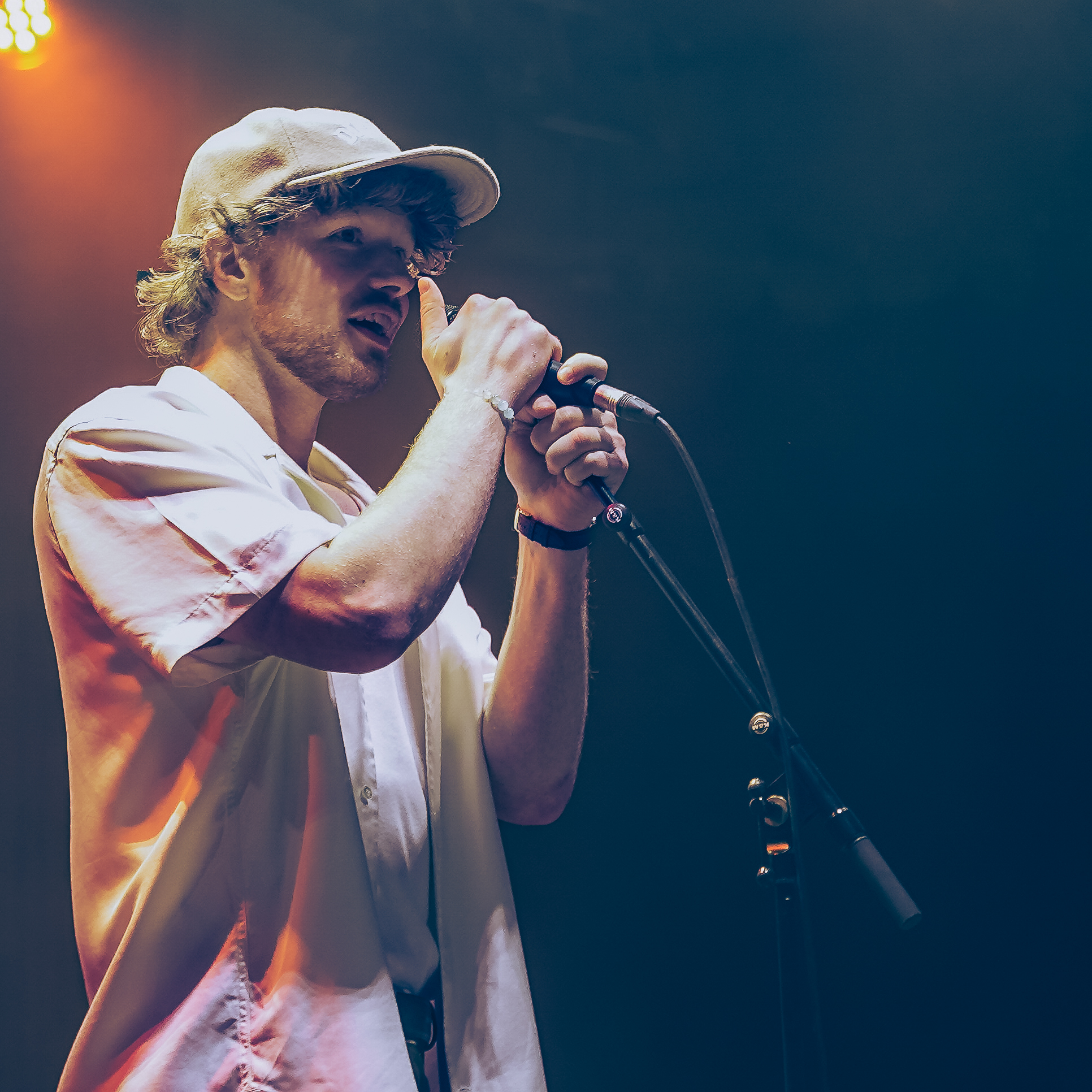

Background information
- Born: Adam Taylor; Doncaster, UK
- Genres: Pop, R&B, Singer-songwriter
- Occupations: Singer, songwriter
- Years active: 2020–present
- Label: BMG

Adam Taylor, known professionally as ADMT, is an English singer-songwriter from Doncaster, South Yorkshire.

== Early life ==
ADMT was born in Doncaster and was largely brought up by his mother. Whilst living in Doncaster, he worked a range of jobs, including roles at a fruit market, fish market and a glass bottle making factory. In 2025, he returned to Doncaster Market to visit his former colleagues, who recalled him singing whilst working on shift at a fish stall.

ADMT studied at the Leeds College of Music, which he credits with changing his musical direction.

== Musical style and influences ==
ADMT's music has been described as blending R&B beats with pop hooks. He described his writing style as “honest”, coining the term "Donny Swag" to reflect his Doncaster roots. He has referenced artists such as Ed Sheeran, Stevie Wonder and James Brown as important influences on his songwriting, and has spoken about being raised on Motown records with his father.

He has described his songwriting as being strongly personal, discussing themes of mental health, loneliness and resilience.

== Career ==
ADMT began releasing music in 2020, releasing “Man Now”, “Dream” and “Good For You” that year. He received early support from BBC Radio 6 Music’s Huw Stephens. ADMT’s 2022 release “One Night” was re-released later that year as part of his debut EP “Lost”.

In 2023, ADMT released an acoustic cover of 50 Cent's 2005 single “Best Friend”. After a period of rapid growth online and receiving 50 Cent's approval, ADMT later released a full version of the track which brought him to “global attention”.

ADMT released his second EP “Without You” in 2024.

ADMT has consistently performed live throughout his career. During the pandemic, he played his first live shows busking on the streets of Manchester, Sheffield and Leeds. When lockdown restrictions eased, ADMT began touring across the UK and Europe, including support shows with James Arthur and Anne-Marie. He has also performed at major festivals including Reading & Leeds, British Summer Time, Y Not and Boardmasters.

In 2025, ADMT signed a record deal with BMG. “Come Along”, his first single under the new label, was released in May of the same year. In March 2026, ADMT was announced to support Louis Tomlinson on his “How Did We Get Here?” Tour.

== Discography ==
=== Albums ===
List of EPs, with selected details
Title	Details
From Good to Bad and Then Back Again	Released: 15 May 2026; Label: oEoE, BMG

=== Extended plays ===
List of EPs, with selected details
Title	Details
Lost	Released: 19 August 2022; Label: oEoE
Without You	Released: 29 March 2024; Label: oEoE
