= Canceled Louis Tomlinson and Zayn Malik documentary series =

Canceled documentary series

- Genre: Television documentary
- Directed by: Nicola Marsh
- Starring: Louis Tomlinson; Zayn Malik
- Country of origin: United States
- Original language: English
- No. of episodes: 3

Production
- Executive producers: Ross Dinerstein; Rebecca Evans
- Production company: Campfire Studios

Original release
- Network: Netflix

Louis Tomlinson and Zayn Malik were planned to star in an American television documentary series directed by Nicola Marsh for Netflix. The 3-episode show would follow the former One Direction members on a road trip across the United States as they discuss their lives, loss, fatherhood, and careers. The project was announced over a year after former band member Liam Payne's death from a fall from a balcony in October 2024. Tomlinson and Malik previously engaged in a social media feud after Malik's departure from the band in 2015, which led to a falling out. The series was expected to premiere in 2026. In April 2026, it was reported that a physical altercation between Malik and Tomlinson led to the project being cancelled.

== Premise ==
The 3 episode documentary series would follow Tomlinson and Malik on a road trip across the United States, with them discussing love, fatherhood, life, loss, and their careers since their band One Direction's split.

== Background ==
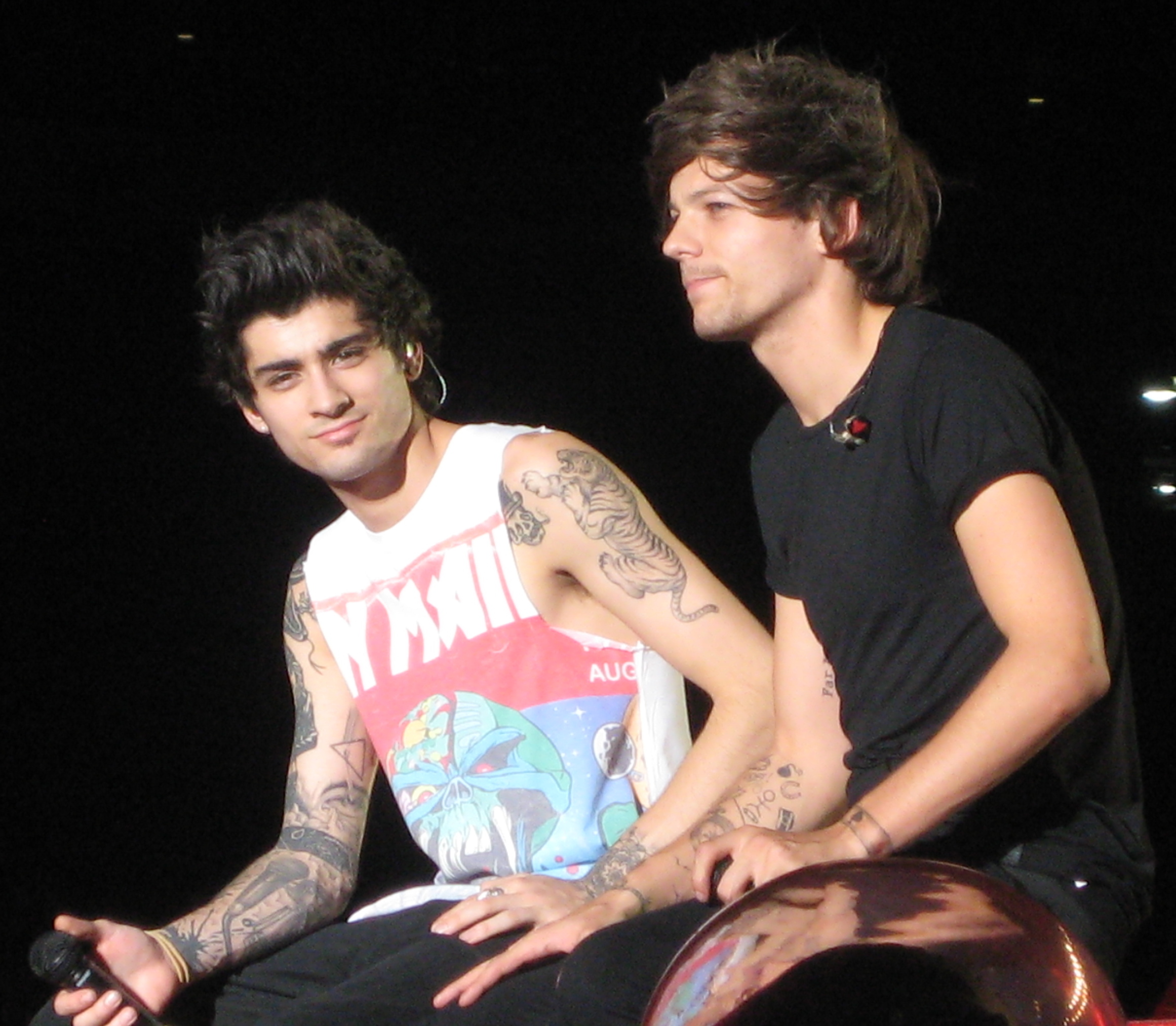
Zayn Malik (left) and Louis Tomlinson during One Direction's Where We Are Tour

Tomlinson and Malik were both members of the boy band One Direction, formed on The X Factor in 2010. The band became one of the best-selling boy bands of all time, selling over 70 million records. Shortly after Malik's departure from the band in 2015, he and Tomlinson engaged in a social media feud, which led to a falling out. In 2017, Tomlinson said that his mother had wanted the pair to reconcile prior to her death in December 2016. By 2022, Tomlinson and Malik had not reconciled. The band split in 2016.

On October 16, 2024, former band member Liam Payne died in Buenos Aires Argentina after falling from a hotel balcony. Tomlinson, Malik, and remaining band members Niall Horan and Harry Styles reunited publicly for the first time at Payne's funeral in November. Tomlinson and Malik were first spotted together following the funeral at the latter's show on the Stairway to the Sky Tour in January 2025. Rumors about a collaboration between Tomlinson and Malik emerged in September 2025 after the pair were seen out together publicly in New York City and Nashville. In an interview soon after, Tomlinson avoided directly answering questions related to the speculation. The Sun was the first publication to confirm a documentary series was being made by the singers. On October 2, a press release by the singers confirmed the news.

== Production ==
The documentary series was directed by Nicola Marsh, distributed by Netflix, and produced by Campfire Studios. Ross Dinerstein and Rebecca Evans served as executive producers to the show. Horan and Styles were not expected to appear. As of October 2025, filming had commenced. The series was expected to premiere in 2026. Campfire Studio's Ross Dinerstein clarified that the series was not a "One Direction show", but rather a series where Malik and Tomlinson reconnected.

In April 2026, it was reported by The Sun that the series had been cancelled by Netflix following an incident where Malik insulted Tomlinson's deceased mother, and then punched him. Tomlinson reportedly suffered a concussion. Marsh commented about the incident on an Instagram story, saying "And there goes the last year of work". Following the report, Tomlinson and his sisters unfollowed Malik on Instagram.
