= Bilk (band) =

British musical group

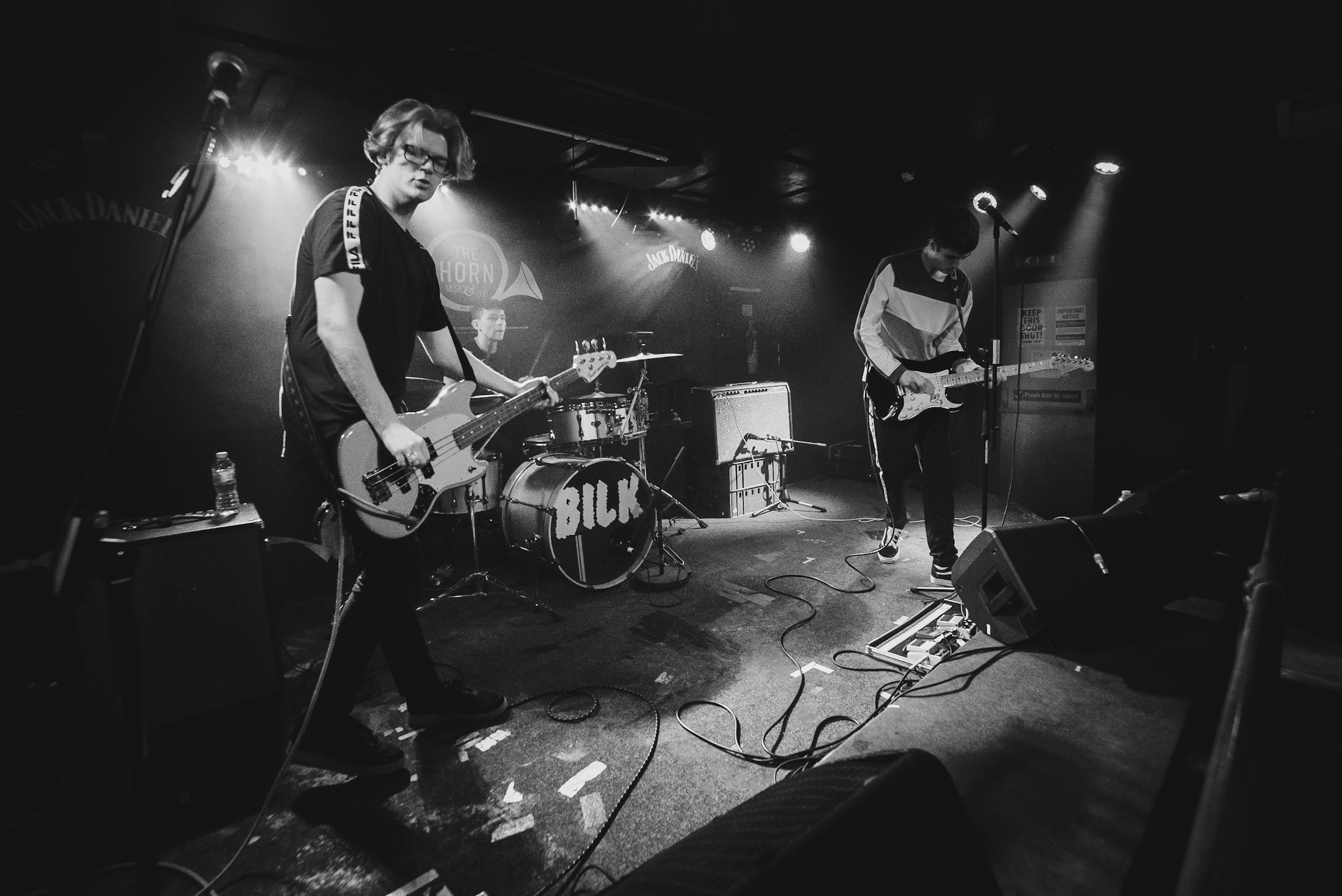
- Bilk in 2019

Background information
- Origin: Chelmsford, England
- Genres: Indie rock; punk rock; rap rock
- Years active: 2018–present
- Label: Scruff of the Neck Records
- Members: Sol Abrahams; Luke Hare; Dalton John Foster
- Past members: Harry Gray
- Website: bilkband.co.uk

Bilk are an English indie rock band formed in Chelmsford, Essex, consisting of Sol Abrahams on vocals, Luke Hare on bass and Dalton John Foster on guitar. After debuting in 2018 and going on to release a number of singles and EPs, the band released their self-titled debut album in 2023.

== Career ==
The concept for the band was developed in 2015 by vocalist and guitarist Sol Abrahams, who spent two years working with different musicians. Abrahams took inspiration for the name from his father's job as a London cab driver. Abrahams met Luke Hare through an early concert and invited him to join in 2017 when Bilk's initial bassist quit. They had another drummer before happening upon Harry Gray who ended up leaving in 2026. The reason he left is currently undisclosed. The band announced in August they added a second guitarist Dalton John Foster.

In an interview, Abrahams said of his string of former Bilk bandmates:

I was doing Bilk with other musicians for a couple years before I even met Luke and Harry. Shit didn't work out with those guys for various reasons. We went through about six different drummers because I could never get along with them and the one bass player I had before Luke fucked off to become a lawyer or something.

I knew Luke because he came to one of my early gigs and I met him briefly after the show. He then later came round for a rehearsal. We both liked Harrington jackets and early Green Day so we got on pretty well. Then it was me, Luke, and this other drummer for a bit but shit went tits up with him so that's where we found Harry.

— Sol Abrahams

Bilk officially debuted in 2018 with the singles "Give Up", "Spiked", "Next Weekend", and "Slob". That summer, they played at the RiZe Festival.

In 2019, Bilk self-released their debut EP titled Chipped Out. They had gigs at Bearded Theory and the Reeperbahn Festival. The single "I Got Knocked Out the Same Night England Did", written during the 2018 FIFA World Cup, was released ahead of the UEFA Euro 2020.

Bilk signed with Scruff of the Neck Records, through which they released their second EP, Allow It, in 2021. That summer, they played at Louis Tomlinson's inaugural Away From Home Festival, which was founded to celebrate the return of live music. The following year, they reunited with Tomlinson as one of the opening acts on the UK leg of his self-titled world tour. They also embarked on their own tour in late 2021 and early 2022. In January 2022 their song A Brand New Day was used in Emmy nominated American police drama The Rookie, while in summer they played the Great Escape Festival and Reading and Leeds Festivals. Thereafter they released their third EP, Just Don't Work For Me.

In 2023, Bilk released their self-titled debut album, which was recorded on a farm outside Manchester. They went on tour of the UK to celebrate the album's release. They also played at the SXSW, London Calling, 2000trees, Truck Festival, Tramlines Festival, Y Not Festival, and again at the Reading and Leeds festivals. There were further tour dates in late 2023.

Bilk's sophomore album, Essex, Drugs and Rock and Roll, was released in January 2025. Following the album's release the band set out, starting in February, on their largest tour to date, which would travel around the UK and then Europe.

== Artistry ==
Bilk have cited the likes of The Jam, Arctic Monkeys, Jamie T, The Streets, the Sex Pistols, Nirvana, and John Cooper Clarke as the band's inspirations. Green Day, Oasis, Slowthai, and Dizzee Rascal were also named as formative influences. Abrahams described their second EP Allow It as combining 90s punk with old school hip-hop. Lyrically, Bilk delve into both personal stories and social commentary. The track "Stand Up" from Bilk explicitly criticises the Conservative government.

== Discography ==
=== Albums ===
- Bilk (February 10, 2023)
- Essex, Drugs And Rock And Roll (January 24, 2025)

=== EPs ===
- Chipped Out (October 18, 2019)
- Allow It (November 12, 2021)
- Bilk Unplugged (August 18, 2023)

=== Singles ===
- Give Up (February 2, 2018)
- Spiked (April 13, 2018)
- Next Weekend (October 12, 2018)
- Slob (October 24, 2018)
- CM2 (March 8, 2019)
- Weed Song (October 4, 2019)
- In Your Car (March 5, 2020)
- I Got Knocked Out the Same Night England Did (May 20, 2020)
- Stop Pranging Out (November 20, 2020)
- Bad News (April 23, 2021)
- Love Is No Easy Game (July 30, 2021)
- Billy Big Bollocks (September 17, 2021)
- Daydreamer (March 25, 2022)
- Hummus and Pitta (June 17, 2022)
- Be Someone (November 11, 2022)
- Just Don't Work for Me (December 9, 2022)
- Fashion (January 27, 2023)
- Something (August 4, 2023)
- RNR (November 17, 2023)
- F Up (August 16, 2024)
- On It (September 27, 2024)
- Summer Days (November 8, 2024)
- Tommy (December 6, 2024)
- Go (January 15, 2025)
- Do Ya Want It (June 26, 2026)
