= Silver Tongues (song) =

Single by Louis Tomlinson

from the album Faith in the Future
- Released: 9 November 2022
- Genre: Pop punk
- Length: 3:24
- Label: BMG
- Songwriters: Louis Tomlinson; Theo Hutchcraft; David Sneddon; Joseph Cross
- Producer: Cross

Louis Tomlinson singles chronology
"Out of My System" (2022)	"Silver Tongues" (2022)	"Lemonade" (2025)

Music video
- "Silver Tongues" on YouTube

"Silver Tongues" is a song by English singer-songwriter Louis Tomlinson. It was released on 9 November 2022, as the third and final single from his second studio album, Faith in the Future via BMG.

== Background and composition ==
"Silver Tongues" is about a connection with someone special, only wanting to stay in the moment where the feeling is the utmost comfort. The track was written by Louis Tomlinson, Theo Hutchcraft, David Sneddon and Joseph Cross while production was handled by Cross. The song is described as pop punk, blending in a piano-backed verse before shifting to a guitar-heavy chorus. He stated that the track was one of his favourites from the album and that he's "immensely proud of."

== Critical reception ==
"Silver Tongues" was met with positive reviews from music critics. Carl Smith of Official Charts Company stated, "Louis' vocals atop a sparse piano melody, not too far removed from that of Walls album track 'Fearless'. Delivering a vocal drenched in confidence, the unlikely subject of the song soon becomes apparent." He also praised Tomlinson's change in sound and his abstract songwriting. Finlay Holden of ReadDork.com described the song as "a joyful reflection of the past, bursting with hope and optimism, and a soaring chorus." Jen Southern of The Honey Pop remarked, "'Silver Tongues' feels absolutely packed full of nostalgia, both lyrically and sonically. Musically, it is new but so utterly timeless."

== Music video ==
The music video for "Silver Tongues" premiered on 13 November 2022, via VEVO and was directed by Charlie Sarsfield.

== Track listing ==
Digital download
No.	Title	Length
1.	"Silver Tongues"	3:24
2.	"Out of My System"	2:17
3.	"Bigger Than Me"	3:41

== Personnel ==
Credits for "Silver Tongues" adapted from AllMusic.

Musicians

- Louis Tomlinson – vocals
- Theo Hutchcraft – backing vocals
- Joseph Cross – bass
- Alex Thomas – drum
- Chris Illingworth – piano

Production

- David Sneddon – producer
- Joseph Cross – producer
- Theo Hutchcraft – producer
- Dan Grech-Marguerat – programming, engineering
- Dick Beetham – engineering
- George Atkins – engineering
- Red Triangle – vocal producer
- Zak Baker – assistant engineering

== Charts ==
Chart performance for "Silver Tongues"
Chart (2022)	Peak position
New Zealand Hot Singles (RMNZ)	40
