= Out of My System (Louis Tomlinson song) =

Single by Louis Tomlinson

from the album Faith in the Future
- Released: 14 October 2022
- Genre: Industrial rock; pop punk
- Length: 2:17
- Label: BMG
- Songwriters: Louis Tomlinson; Dave Gibson; Nicolas Rebscher
- Producer: Rebscher

Louis Tomlinson singles chronology
"Bigger Than Me" (2022)	"Out of My System" (2022)	"Silver Tongues" (2022)

Music video
- "Out of My System" on YouTube

"Out of My System" is a song by English singer-songwriter Louis Tomlinson. It was released on 14 October 2022, as the second single from his second studio album, Faith in the Future via BMG.

== Background ==
On 11 October 2022, Tomlinson shared a preview of "Out of My System" via social media. The song is about Tomlinson, "leaving his demons behind and embracing his future." He stated that the track was one of his favourites from the album.

== Composition ==
"Out of My System" was written by Louis Tomlinson, Dave Gibson, Nicolas Rebscher while production was handled by Rebscher. Musically, the track takes a different approach than his previous single, "Bigger Than Me", taking on "a more abrasive, indie punk vibe." Tomlinson stated that the song was inspired by the Arctic Monkeys' "Teddy Picker" and "Dancing Shoes".

== Critical reception ==
"Out of My System" was met with positive reviews. Music critics described the sound of the song as, industrial rock and pop punk. Larisha Paul of Rolling Stone stated that the track, "builds itself around a thumping bass line as Tomlinson reaches out for anything that might make him feel electric." Sagun Shrestha of The Georgetown Voice remarked, "On first listen, 'Out Of My System' is repetitive and far too generic for the likes of Tomlinson," however added, "Tomlinson leans towards a stronger sound [...] with heavy guitar riffs that fade into drums as he begins to sing." Ending off the review, she stated, "It's a track made to yell, to hype up, and to exert frustrations; and it's catchy enough to get stuck in your head all day." Adrianne Reece of Elite Daily described the track as "an angsty mantra about self-realization and seeking one's life purpose."

== Music video ==
The music video for "Out of My System" premiered via VEVO on 19 October 2022. The music video was directed by Charlie Sarsfield and visually shows fast-paced camerawork, set in saturated red lighting and distorted frame rates with close-up angle shots.

== Track listing ==
Digital download
No.	Title	Length
1.	"Out of My System"	2:17
2.	"Bigger Than Me"	3:41

== Personnel ==
Musicians

- Louis Tomlinson – vocals
- Nicolas Rebscher – guitar, keyboards, bass
- Carlo Caduff – drum

Production

- Nicolas Rebscher – producer, programming, sound engineering
- Dan Grech-Marguerat – additional programming, sound engineering
- Dick Beetham – sound engineering
- Axel Reinemer – sound engineering
- Marian Hafenstein – sound engineering

== Charts ==
Chart performance for "Out of My System"
Chart (2022)	Peak position
New Zealand Hot Singles (RMNZ)	37
UK Singles Downloads (OCC)	71
