= Palaces (Louis Tomlinson song) =

- CD cover

Single by Louis Tomlinson

from the album How Did I Get Here?
- B-side: "Looks Like Lucy (Demo)"
- Released: 14 November 2025
- Genre: Indie rock
- Length: 2:47
- Label: BMG
- Songwriters: Nico Rebscher; Theo Hutchcraft; Louis Tomlinson
- Producer: Nico Rebscher

Louis Tomlinson singles chronology
"Lemonade" (2025)	"Palaces" (2025)	"Imposter" (2026)

"Palaces" is a song by English singer–songwriter Louis Tomlinson from his album How Did I Get Here? It was released on 14 November 2025 as the album's second single.

== Background and release ==
The song was written by Theo Hutchcraft, Nico Rebscher, and Tomlinson, and produced by Rebscher. On social media, he announced that the single would be released on 14 November 2025. On the release day, Tomlinson stated, "This has been one of my favourite songs on the record since writing it."

== Reception ==
Robin Murray for Clash rated the single 8/10, saying that the song "is the sound of Louis Tomlinson speaking on his truth", and states that he is "determined to honour his instincts."

== Charts ==
Chart performance for "Palaces"
Chart (2025–2026)	Peak position
Bolivia Anglo Airplay (Monitor Latino)	12
Paraguay Anglo Airplay (Monitor Latino)	13
UK Singles Sales (OCC)	11
