= Imposter (Louis Tomlinson song) =

Single by Louis Tomlinson

from the album How Did I Get Here?
- B-side: "Save Me Time (Demo)"
- Released: 20 January 2026
- Length: 2:38
- Label: BMG
- Songwriters: Nico Rebscher; Dave Gibson; Louis Tomlinson
- Producer: Nico Rebscher

Louis Tomlinson singles chronology
"Palaces" (2025)	"Imposter" (2026)

Music video
- "Imposter" on YouTube

"Imposter" is a song by English singer–songwriter Louis Tomlinson from his album How Did I Get Here? It was released on 20 January 2026 as the album's third and final single before its release on 23 January.

== Background and release ==
The song was written by Nico Rebscher, Dave Gibson, and Tomlinson, and was produced by Rebscher. The song talks about Tomlinson's struggles with Imposter syndrome and with self-worth. Of the single, Tomlinson states, "Imposter was written in the jungle in Costa Rica. Conceptually it leans into the idea of identity." He also states that the song is "probably the most melodic moment on the record".

== Reception ==
Alex Harris for Neon Music says that "Imposter syndrome makes for neat interview copy. Every artist claims it now. But most don’t build the syndrome into the song's architecture. Tomlinson did." Harris also claims that the song "insists it belongs on playlists next to confident indie hitmakers whilst the lyrics undermine that claim." Eva Elisa Wells of OffTheRecordPress praised "Imposter" as it "blends its lyrical vulnerability with moody production", and that the "shift in confidence" contributes to a "bolder and brighter album."

== Charts ==
=== Weekly charts ===
Weekly chart performance
Chart (2026)	Peak position
Bolivia Anglo Airplay (Monitor Latino)	7
Brazil Airplay (Top 100 Brasil)	94
Chile Anglo Airplay (Monitor Latino)	16
Costa Rica Anglo Airplay (Monitor Latino)	13
Ecuador Anglo Airplay (Monitor Latino)	10
Estonia Airplay (TopHit)	68
Guatemala Anglo Airplay (Monitor Latino)	15
Italy Airplay (EarOne)	46
Latin America Anglo Airplay (Monitor Latino)	20
Lithuania Airplay (TopHit)	65
Mexico Anglo Airplay (Monitor Latino)	10
New Zealand Hot Singles (RMNZ)	20
North Macedonia Airplay (Radiomonitor)	4
Paraguay Anglo Airplay (Monitor Latino)	4
UK Singles Sales (OCC)	7
Venezuela Anglo Airplay (Monitor Latino)	12

=== Monthly charts ===
Monthly chart performance
Chart (2026)	Peak position
Estonia Airplay (TopHit)	81
Lithuania Airplay (TopHit)	85
