= Picture Parlour =

English indie rock band

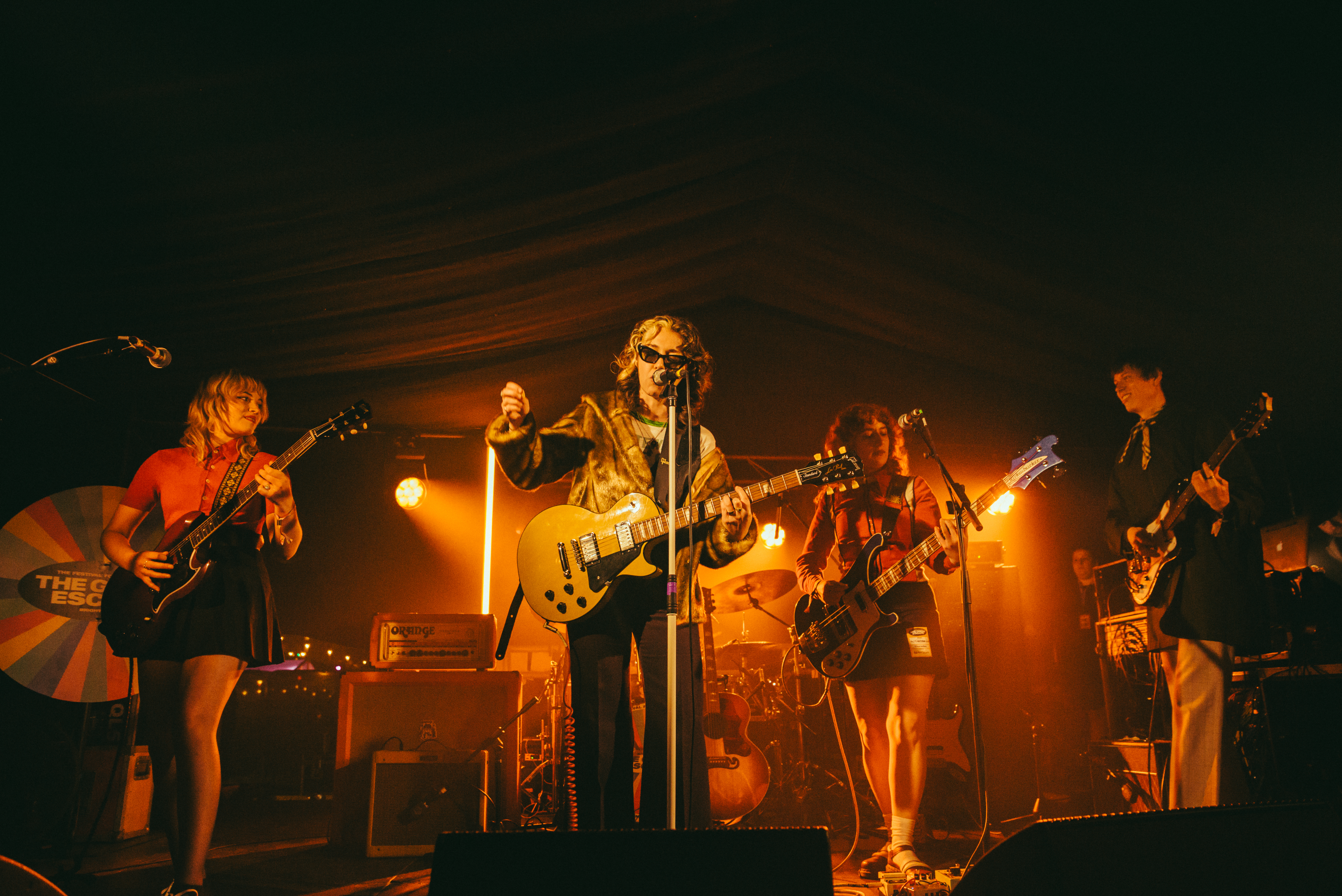
- Picture Parlour performing in Brighton, 2025

Background information
- Genres: Indie rock
- Years active: 2021–present
- Members: Katherine Parlour; Ella Risi; Kitty Fitz; Joey Django; Michael Nash
- Past members: Sian Lynch
- Website: https://www.pictureparlour.co.uk

Picture Parlour are an English indie rock band formed in Manchester by Katherine Parlour (vocals and guitar) and Ella Risi (guitar). Their lineup is completed by Kitty Fitz (bass/rhythm guitar), Joey Django (rhythm guitar/bass) and Michael Nash (drums). The band performed their debut show in December 2022 at The Windmill, Brixton, and immediately became regular performers there. The band released their debut single "Norwegian Wood" on 19 June 2023, which was followed by "Judgement Day" on 18 October 2023.

== History ==
Katherine Parlour and Ella Risi met in Manchester as students and formed Picture Parlour as a duo, before relocating to London in 2021. The band recruited Sian Lynch and Michael Nash through a local Facebook musicians group.

Picture Parlour performed their first show at The Windmill, Brixton, in December 2022. After several performances there, the band began receiving offers from people in the music industry, through which the band chose a manager. The band received a major boost when Courtney Love shared a post about the band on Instagram.

The band released its debut single "Norwegian Wood" on 19 June 2023, mixed by Alan Moulder. Second single "Judgement Day" was released on 18 October 2023, produced by Catherine Marks.

Picture Parlour have been accused of being an "industry plant" and "nepo babies" online, to which Parlour has responded "You couldn’t have put the target on a more ridiculous head. Ella’s mom is a cleaner. My dad’s a retired factory worker."

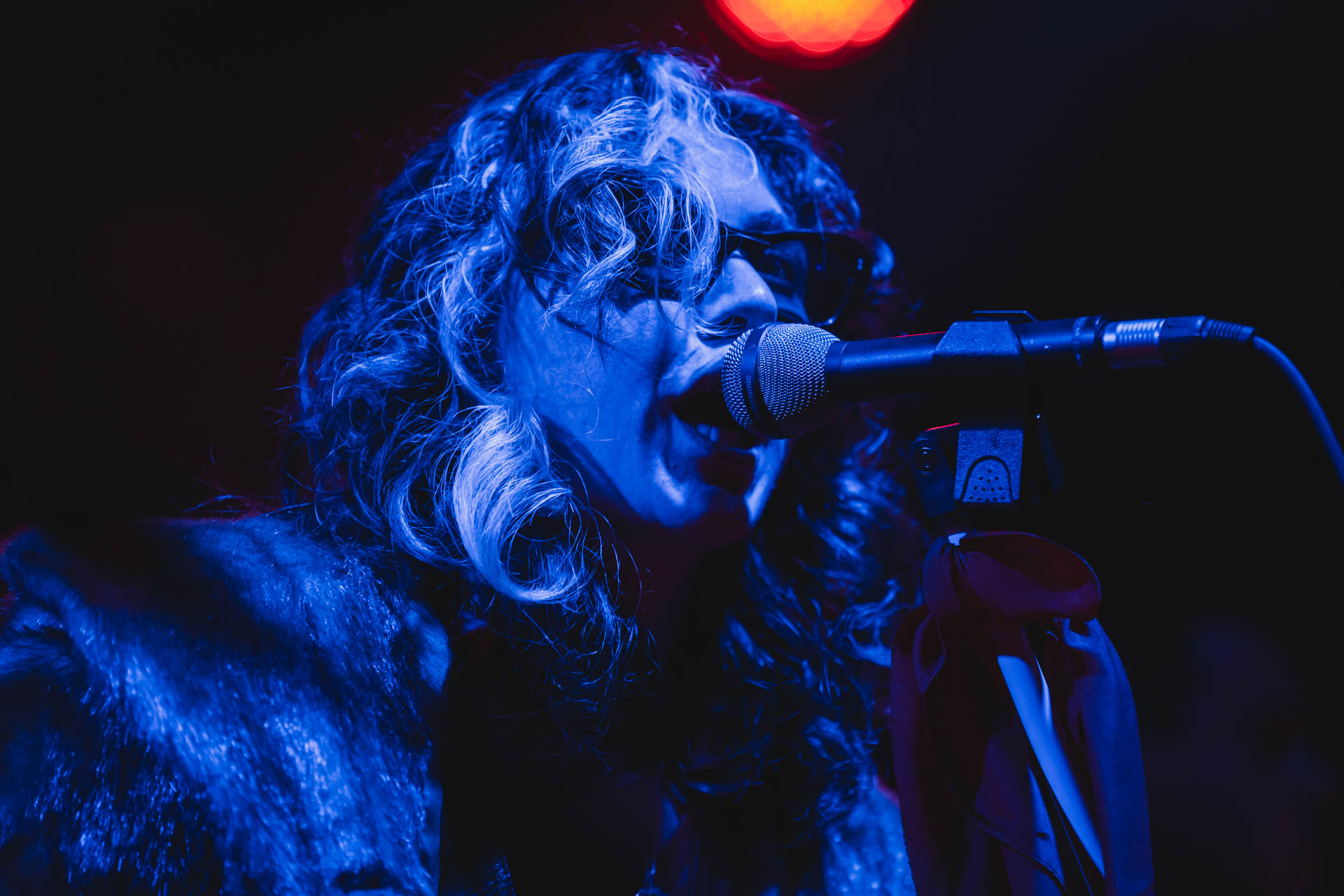
Picture Parlour at the Escape to the City Festival in Sept 2025

In February 2025 Picture Parlour played at the Windmill Brixton with a new five piece line up. Katherine Parlour, Ella Risi and Michael Nash are now joined by Kitty Fitz and Joey Django interchanging on joint bass and rhythm guitar duties with Kitty also adding additional backing vocals.

In July 2025 Picture Parlour played a six night headline tour in association with the Music Venue Trust playing at Hot Box Chelmsford, The Railway Inn Winchester, The Piper St Leonards on Sea, Where Else? Margate, The Castle Luton, and The George Tavern London.

== Musical style ==
The band have cited Nick Cave, Fleetwood Mac, Patti Smith, and T. Rex as influences. "Norwegian Wood" has been compared to the works of Chrissie Hynde, Alex Turner, and Amy Winehouse.

== Discography ==
List of singles
Title	Single details
Norwegian Wood	Released: 24 July 2023; Label: Island Records; Formats: Streaming
Judgement Day	Released: 18 October 2023; Label: Island Records; Formats: Streaming
Who's There to Love Without You?	Released: 23 April 2025; Label: Island/EMI label group; Formats: Streaming
Cielo Drive	Released: 13 June 2025; Label: Island/EMI label group; Formats: Streaming
Talk About It	Released: 21 July 2025; Label: Island/EMI label group; Formats: Streaming

List of extended plays
Title	Tracklist	EP details
Face in the Picture	1. "Face in the Picture"; 2. "Dial Up"; 3. "Ronnie"; 4. "Moon Tonic"	Released: 14 June 2024; Label: Island Records; Formats: Streaming, vinyl

List of albums
Title	Tracklist	Album details
The Parlour	1. Cielo Drive; 2. 24Hr Open; 3. Who's There to Love Without You; 4. Used To Be Your Girlfriend; 5. Neptune 66; 6. Around The Bend; 7. Talk About It; 8. Ronnie's Note #3 (Lucky Man); 9. 4$ Fantasy; 10. Norwegian Wood; 11. The Travelling Show	Released: 14 Nov 2025; Label: Island Records; Formats: Streaming, vinyl
