= Faith in the Future (Louis Tomlinson album) =

2022 studio album by Louis Tomlinson

Studio album by Louis Tomlinson
- Released: 11 November 2022
- Recorded: 2020–2022
- Genre: Indie rock; Britpop; pop punk
- Length: 45:14
- Label: 78; BMG
- Producer: Mike Crossey; Nicolas Rebscher; Joe Cross; Red Triangle; James Vincent McMorrow; Jay Mooncie; Frederik Ball

Louis Tomlinson chronology
Walls (2020)	Faith in the Future (2022)	Live (2024)

Singles from Faith in the Future
- 1. "Bigger Than Me" Released: 1 September 2022; 2. "Out of My System" Released: 14 October 2022; 3. "Silver Tongues" Released: 9 November 2022

Faith in the Future is the second studio album by the English singer-songwriter Louis Tomlinson. It was released on 11 November 2022 independently through BMG. Tomlinson announced the album's release date, track listing and album artwork on 31 August 2022. The album was supported by three singles: "Bigger Than Me", "Out of My System" and "Silver Tongues". The album debuted at No. 1 in the UK, making it his first in the country as a solo artist. To support Faith in the Future, Tomlinson embarked on the Faith in the Future World Tour, which commenced in May 2023.

== Background ==
Following the release of his debut album Walls, Tomlinson confirmed in July 2020 that he would be working on his second album. Tomlinson confirmed that he had finished the album in August 2022. Upon the album announcement, he wrote;

I'm so excited to finally tell you that my new album Faith In the Future is out 11th November. After living with this album for a while I can't wait for you all to hear it. Thank you for allowing me to make the music I want to make.

Tomlinson also stated that he had enjoyed the recording process a lot more than working on Walls because, as he declared in his documentary All of Those Voices, he had the experience of playing two live shows from the tour Louis Tomlinson World Tour before the tour was delayed due to the COVID pandemic and that gave him the inspiration to found his new sound "something which honors the live show" highlighting that "the thing I wanted to get out of this record, mostly, was to create a great live experience on the next tour."

On 29 September 2022, Tomlinson appeared on American DJ Zach Sang's YouTube podcast Zach Sang Show, where he talked about how Faith in the Future became the title of the album;

In lockdown, for whatever reason, that phrase found its way onto my lap and it spoke to me in a certain way. I wanted this album to feel more hopeful than my last record, and I think it does that from the off of that statement. About 9 months ago I put out on my social media that phrase with no context and I just felt there was this kind of magic around that phrase, so I kinda built the album around it.

Tomlinson worked with Theo Hutchcraft, David Sneddon and Joe Cross from The Courteeners, over a winter in the countryside, Tomlinson describing it as "a writing camp", and wrote "Silver Tongues", "Saturdays" and "She Is Beauty We Are World Class". Tomlinson decided to work with artists rather than professional songwriters for the record, as he believes it allows for more natural conversations and "focus on the heart of the music". Tomlinson commenced his Faith in the Future World Tour to support the album in May 2023.

Tomlinson announced the release date, track listing, and album artwork on 31 August 2022. The album was released on 11 November 2022, through BMG. A deluxe CD zine edition of Faith in the Future includes two more songs, "Headline" and "Holding On to Heartache".

== Singles ==
Tomlinson announced "Bigger Than Me" as the first single, which was released on 1 September 2022. The second single, "Out of My System", was released 14 October 2022. On 8 November 2022, Tomlinson announced via his social media that "Silver Tongues" will be released as the third single on the following day.

== Critical reception ==
Professional ratings
Aggregate scores
Source	Rating
Metacritic	68/100
Review scores
Source	Rating
AllMusic	4/5 stars
Clash	5/10
Dork	4/5 stars
Euphoria	4.5/5 stars
NME	4/5 stars
The Guardian	2/5 stars

At Metacritic, which assigns a normalised rating out of 100 to reviews from professional critics, the album has an average score of 68 out of 100, based on four reviews, indicating "generally favorable reviews".

In a mixed review, Clash writer Robin Murray stated that "Faith in the Future" can at times become stuck in formula, failing to rock the boat in the process," and added that "It's all perfectly pleasant, but you end up yearning to an injection of… well, anything, really." Writing for Dork Jessica Goodman described the album as "eclectic, electric, and always energetic" while also stating that it's "a collection of songs purpose-made for pints-in-the-air, arms-around-shoulders, voices-to-the-rafters sing-alongs." Rhian Daly of NME notes that the record "feels much more assured" and "is a solid step forward as the musician continues what he's acknowledged will be 'an ever-evolving process'." The Guardian's Alim Kheraj lamented that "Tomlinson himself, is lost in a sea of influences", but pointed out that "apocalyptic rave synths and woozy reverb-heavy guitars at least gesture towards experimentation."

=== Accolades ===
At the end of 2022, Faith in the Future appeared on critics' lists ranking the year's top albums.

Publication	List	Rank
Alternative Press	The 55 Best Albums of 2022	28
The Georgetown Voice	Best Albums of 2022	6

== Commercial performance ==
Faith in the Future debuted at number 1 in the UK with 35,239 units sold in its first week, marking Tomlinson's first number 1 album and making him the fourth member of One Direction to achieve a number one solo album. Tomlinson spoke about earning his first number one in the UK calling it "an absolute honour." In addition, the album also peaked at number one in Argentina, Belgium, and Spain.

In the US, the album debuted at number five on the Billboard 200 selling 43,000 album-equivalent units, including 37,500 in pure album sales. This marks Tomlinson's highest-charting effort and his best selling week to date.

== Track listing ==
Standard edition
No.	Title	Writer(s)	Producer(s)	Length
1.	"The Greatest"	Louis Tomlinson; James Vincent McMorrow; Jay Mooncie; Frederik Ball	McMorrow; J Moon; Ball; Dan Grech-Marguerat^{[a]}; John Foyle^{[a]}	3:01
2.	"Written All Over Your Face"	Tomlinson; Robert Harvey; George Tizzard; Rick Parkhouse	Red Triangle	2:40
3.	"Bigger Than Me"	Tomlinson; Harvey; Tizzard; Parkhouse	Mike Crossey	3:41
4.	"Lucky Again"	Tomlinson; McMorrow; Mooncie; Ball	Crossey	3:27
5.	"Face the Music"	Tomlinson; Dave Gibson	Red Triangle	2:48
6.	"Chicago"	Tomlinson; Gibson	Red Triangle	3:52
7.	"Common People"	Tomlinson; McMorrow; Mooncie; Ball	McMorrow; J Moon; Ball	2:58
8.	"Out of My System"	Tomlinson; Gibson; Nicolas Rebscher	Rebscher	2:17
9.	"Angels Fly"	Tomlinson; Harvey; Tizzard; Parkhouse	Red Triangle	3:37
10.	"Saturdays"	Tomlinson; Theo Hutchcraft; David Sneddon; Joseph Cross	Cross	4:24
11.	"Silver Tongues"	Tomlinson; Hutchcraft; Sneddon; Cross	Cross	3:25
12.	"She Is Beauty We Are World Class"	Tomlinson; Hutchcraft; Sneddon; Cross	Cross	3:39
13.	"All This Time"	Tomlinson; McMorrow; Mooncie; Ball	Ball; J Moon; McMorrow	2:55
14.	"That's the Way Love Goes"	Tomlinson; Harvey; Tizzard; Parkhouse	Red Triangle	2:30
Total length:				45:14

Deluxe edition
No.	Title	Writer(s)	Producer(s)	Length
7.	"All This Time"	Tomlinson; McMorrow; Mooncie; Ball	Ball; J Moon; McMorrow	2:55
8.	"Out of My System"	Tomlinson; Gibson; Nicolas Rebscher	Rebscher	2:17
9.	"Headline"	Tomlinson; Tizzard; Parkhouse; Craig Fitzgerald; Stephen Murtagh	Red Triangle	2:53
10.	"Saturdays"	Tomlinson; Hutchcraft; Sneddon; Cross	Cross	4:24
11.	"Silver Tongues"	Tomlinson; Hutchcraft; Sneddon; Cross	Cross	3:25
12.	"She Is Beauty We Are World Class"	Tomlinson; Hutchcraft; Sneddon; Cross	Cross	3:39
13.	"Common People"	Tomlinson; McMorrow; Mooncie; Ball	McMorrow; J Moon; Ball	2:58
14.	"Angels Fly"	Tomlinson; Harvey; Tizzard; Parkhouse	Red Triangle	3:37
15.	"Holding On to Heartache"	Tomlinson; McMorrow; Mooncie; Ball	McMorrow; J Moon; Ball; Grech-Marguerat^{[a]}; Foyle^{[a]}	3:30
16.	"That's the Way Love Goes"	Tomlinson; Harvey; Tizzard; Parkhouse	Red Triangle	2:30
Total length:				51:37

Target and Japanese edition
No.	Title	Writer(s)	Producer(s)	Length
15.	"Paradise"	Tomlinson; Gibson		3:31
16.	"Holding On to Heartache"	Tomlinson; McMorrow; Mooncie; Ball	McMorrow; J Moon; Ball; Grech-Marguerat^{[a]}; Foyle^{[a]}	3:30
17.	"Copy of a Copy of a Copy" (live from Lima)			4:15
18.	"That's the Way Love Goes"	Tomlinson; Harvey; Tizzard; Parkhouse	Red Triangle	2:30
Total length:				59:23

Digital deluxe bonus edition tracks
No.	Title	Writer(s)	Producer(s)	Length
17.	"Change"	Tomlinson; Harvey; Tizzard; Parkhouse	Red Triangle	4:43
18.	"High in California"	Tomlinson; McMorrow; Mooncie; Ball	McMorrow; J Moon; Ball	3:04
19.	"Face the Music" (Acoustic demo)	Tomlinson; Gibson	Red Triangle	2:38
Total length:				62:02

All of those voices DVD/Faith in the Future CD
No.	Title	Writer(s)	Producer(s)	Length
19.	"Back to You" (studio version)	Tomlinson; Gale; Bowman; Boardman; Blanchard	Steve Durham	2:45
Total length:				62:24

=== Notes ===
- ^{^[a]} signifies an additional producer

== Charts ==
=== Weekly charts ===
Weekly chart performance for Faith in the Future
Chart (2022–2023)	Peak position
Argentine Albums (CAPIF)	1
Australian Albums (ARIA)	2
Austrian Albums (Ö3 Austria)	5
Belgian Albums (Ultratop Flanders)	1
Belgian Albums (Ultratop Wallonia)	2
Canadian Albums (Billboard)	5
Danish Albums (Hitlisten)	7
Dutch Albums (Album Top 100)	2
Finnish Albums (Suomen virallinen lista)	6
French Albums (SNEP)	9
German Albums (Offizielle Top 100)	2
Hungarian Albums (MAHASZ)	23
Irish Albums (OCC)	4
Italian Albums (FIMI)	3
Lithuanian Albums (AGATA)	18
New Zealand Albums (RMNZ)	3
Norwegian Albums (VG-lista)	28
Polish Albums (ZPAV)	4
Portuguese Albums (AFP)	2
Scottish Albums (OCC)	2
Spanish Albums (PROMUSICAE)	1
Swedish Albums (Sverigetopplistan)	3
Swiss Albums (Schweizer Hitparade)	9
UK Albums (OCC)	1
UK Independent Albums (OCC)	1
Uruguayan Albums (CUD)	5
US Billboard 200	5
US Independent Albums (Billboard)	2

Weekly chart performance for All of Those Voices
Chart (2023)	Peak position
Belgian Albums (Ultratop Flanders)	15
Belgian Albums (Ultratop Wallonia)	70
Dutch Albums (Album Top 100)	60
Italian Albums (FIMI)	59
US Top Current Albums Sales (Billboard)	46

=== Year-end charts ===
Year-end chart performance for Faith in the Future
Chart (2022)	Position
Belgian Albums (Ultratop Flanders)	113
Spanish Albums (PROMUSICAE)	35

== Certifications ==
Certifications for Faith in the Future
Region	Certification	Certified units/sales
Italy (FIMI)	Gold	25,000^{‡}
Spain (PROMUSICAE)	Gold	20,000^{‡}
United Kingdom (BPI)	Silver	60,000^{‡}
^{‡} Sales+streaming figures based on certification alone.

== Release history ==
Release dates and formats for Faith in the Future
Region	Date	Version	Format	Label	Ref.
Various	11 November 2022	Standard; deluxe; Target	CD; LP; cassette	BMG	
Various	11 November 2022	Standard; deluxe; Target	Digital download; streaming	BMG	
Various	14 November 2022	Digital deluxe	Digital download	BMG	

== See also ==
- List of number-one albums of 2022 (Belgium)
- List of number-one albums of 2022 (Spain)
- List of UK Albums Chart number ones of the 2020s
- List of UK Album Downloads Chart number ones of the 2020s
- List of UK Independent Albums Chart number ones of 2022
