= Bigger Than Me (Louis Tomlinson song) =

2022 single by Louis Tomlinson

Single by Louis Tomlinson

from the album Faith in the Future
- B-side: "Saved By a Stranger (Demo)"
- Released: 1 September 2022
- Genre: Pop rock
- Length: 3:41
- Label: BMG
- Songwriters: George Tizzard; Louis Tomlinson; Rick Parkhouse; Robert Harvey
- Producer: Mike Crossey

Louis Tomlinson singles chronology
| "Walls" (2020) | "Bigger Than Me" (2022) | "Out of My System" (2022) |

Music video
- "Bigger Than Me" on YouTube

"Bigger Than Me" is a song by English singer-songwriter Louis Tomlinson, released through BMG on 1 September 2022. It was released as the first and lead single of his second studio album Faith in the Future. The song was written by Tomlinson, as well as George Tizzard, Richard Parkhouse, and Robert Harvey, and was produced by Mike Crossey.

== Background and release ==
The song was written by Tomlinson, George Tizzard, Richard Parkhouse, and Robert Harvey, and was produced by Mike Crossey. Tomlinson shared that creating the record was an exciting moment, as he felt it was a project that "honoured" his live performances. He reflected on what his live shows meant to fans, and how everything he did was "bigger than [him]", inspiring the song's name. Lyrically, the song is about embracing change and letting go of self-doubt. Tomlinson announced the song on Instagram on 31 August 2022, including a snippet of the song's instrumental. The song was released as the first single from Tomlinson's then-upcoming album Faith in the Future the following day, on 1 September 2022.

== Live performances ==
Tomlinson performed the song live at The Late Late Show with James Corden. He also performed the song live on Good Morning America. On 30 September 2022, Tomlinson released a live version of the single that was performed in Milan, Italy. The track was featured on Live in 2024.

== Music video ==
The music video for "Bigger Than Me" was released on 2 September 2022. Billboard magazine describes the video which showcases "Tomlinson walking through stunning, lush outdoor landscapes lit by the setting sun and collecting stray pieces of wood along his way. When he eventually reaches a bonfire — the sun fully down — he tosses the wood into the flames and watches them burn."

== Reception ==
"Bigger Than Me" debuted at number 56 on the UK Singles Downloads Chart and peaked at number 39. The song also peaked at number 38 on the Billboard Pop Airplay chart and the Hot Trending Songs chart at number 14.

Billboard praised the song for its self-awareness, highlighting lyrics that reveal his realisation that the key to solo success lies in embracing his authentic self and letting go of the pressures that accompany fame.

== Track listing ==
Digital download
| No. | Title | Length |
|---|---|---|
| 1. | "Bigger Than Me" (Live from Milan) | 3:43 |
| 2. | "Bigger Than Me" | 3:41 |

== Personnel ==
Musicians

- Louis Tomlinson – vocals
- Stephen Sesso – guitar
- Dan Crean – drums, percussion
- Mike Crossey – keyboards, bass

Production

- Mike Crossey – programming, sound engineering
- Red Triangle – vocal producer
- Dick Beetham – sound engineering
- Dan Grech-Marguerat – sound engineering

== Charts ==
Chart performance for "Bigger Than Me"
| Chart (2022) | Peak position |
|---|---|
| Belgium (Ultratop 50 Flanders) | 43 |
| Canada CHR/Top 40 (Billboard) | 47 |
| Czech Republic Airplay (ČNS IFPI) | 29 |
| New Zealand Hot Singles (RMNZ) | 27 |
| UK Singles Downloads (OCC) | 39 |
| US Pop Airplay (Billboard) | 34 |

== Release history ==
Release history and formats for "Bigger Than Me"
| Region | Date | Format | Label | Ref. |
|---|---|---|---|---|
| Various | 1 September 2022 | Digital download; streaming | BMG | |
| United States | 13 September 2022 | Contemporary hit radio | BMG | |
