= Louis Tomlinson =

English singer-songwriter (born 1991)

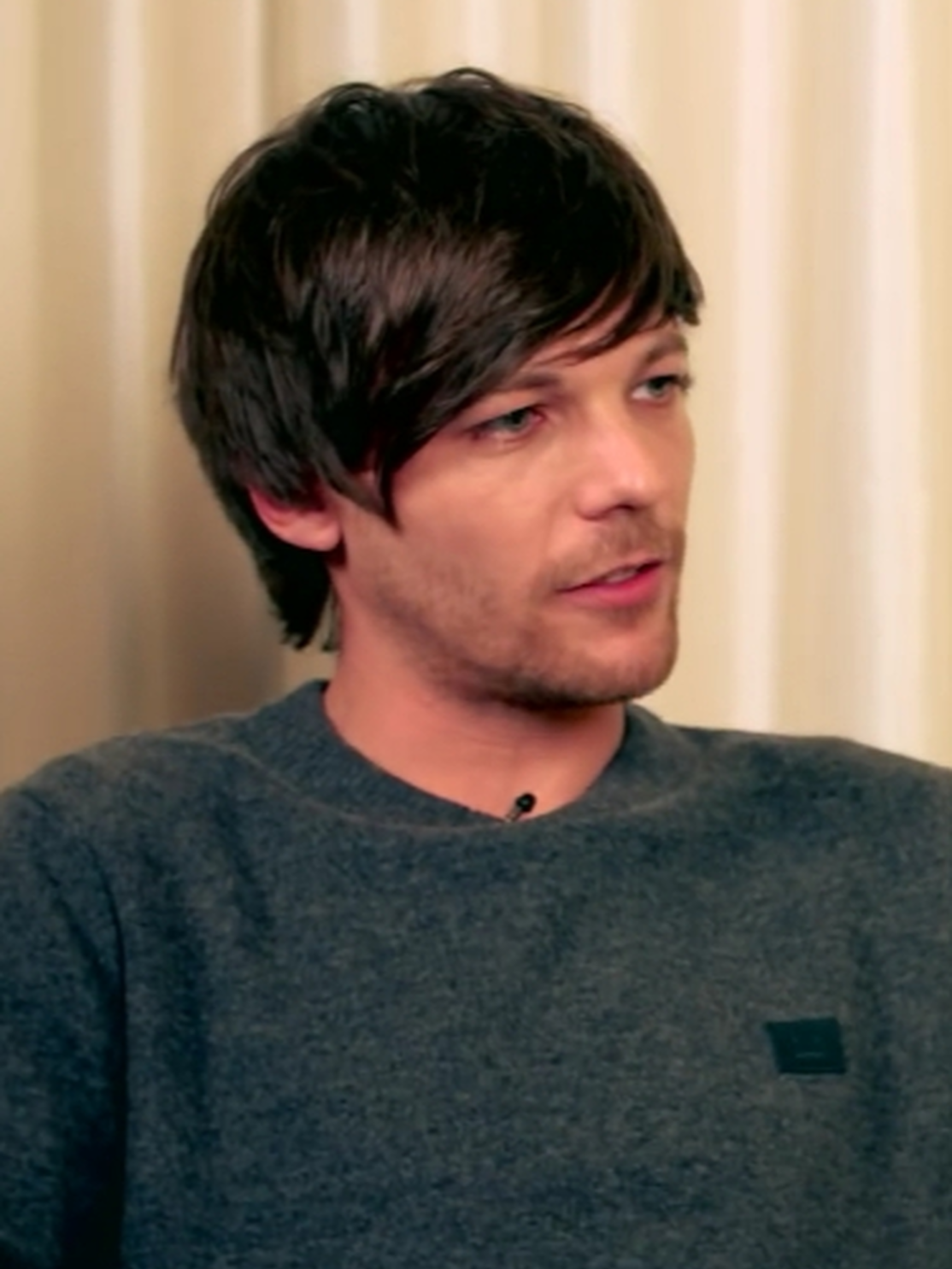
- Tomlinson in 2019
- Born: Louis Troy Austin; 24 December 1991 (age 34); Doncaster, South Yorkshire, England
- Occupation: Singer-songwriter
- Years active: 2010–present
- Works: Solo discography (Note: For his discography as a member of One Direction, see One Direction discography and List of songs recorded by One Direction.); songs written
- Partner: Eleanor Calder (2011–2015; 2017–2022)
- Children: 1
- Musical career
- Genres: Indie rock; indie pop; Britpop; pop rock
- Instrument: Vocals
- Labels: BMG; Arista; Syco; Columbia
- Formerly of: One Direction
- Website: louis-tomlinson.com

Louis William Tomlinson (/ˈluːi ˈtɒmlɪnsən/ LOO-ee TOM-lin-sən; born Louis Troy Austin; 24 December 1991) is an English singer-songwriter. Born and raised in Doncaster, England, Tomlinson auditioned for British singing competition The X Factor as a solo artist in 2010, where he and four rejected solo contestants were placed into a group which became the British-Irish band One Direction, one of the best-selling boy bands of all time.

Following the group's hiatus in 2016, Tomlinson released "Just Hold On" with Steve Aoki as his debut solo single in December 2016. It peaked at number two on the UK Singles Chart and was certified platinum in the UK. In 2017, he released "Back to You" with American singer Bebe Rexha and "Miss You". He appeared on Debrett's 2017 list of the most influential people in the UK. In 2018, he appeared on the fifteenth series of The X Factor as a judge and a mentor of the "Boys" category.

Tomlinson's debut solo studio album, Walls, was released in January 2020, where it debuted at number 4 in the UK and number 9 on the US Billboard 200. Tomlinson's second studio album, Faith in the Future, was released in November 2022, where it debuted at number 1 in the UK and number 5 on the US Billboard 200. Tomlinson commenced his Faith in the Future World Tour in May 2023, which received critical acclaim and earned a nomination for best Live Act from Rolling Stone at their inaugural Rolling Stone UK Awards. His documentary film, All of Those Voices (2022), gained positive reviews from critics. Tomlinson's third album, How Did I Get Here?, also debuted at number 1 in the UK and received generally positive reviews.

Praised for his lyricism, Tomlinson's musical style has been described as indie pop, Britpop, and indie rock, among others. Tomlinson has been involved in philanthropy since 2010, donating millions of pounds towards charities and participating in causes such as Soccer Aid. Tomlinson launched streetwear brand "28" in August 2023, incorporating his native White Rose of York into branding. He is the curator of the Away From Home Festival, an indie music festival.

== Early life and family ==
Tomlinson was born as Louis Troy Austin on 24 December 1991 in Doncaster, South Yorkshire, England, to then 18-year-old Johannah "Jay" Poulston and Troy Austin, who left when he was an infant. He is estranged from his father, and took on his then-stepfather Mark Tomlinson's surname, legally changing his name to Louis William Tomlinson. He was raised with four younger half-sisters; Charlotte, Félicité (2000–2019), and twins Phoebe and Daisy from Poulston's marriage to Mark. He also has three other half-siblings; a younger paternal half-sister, Georgia, and twins Doris and Ernest (born 2014) from Poulston's marriage to Dan Deakin.

Tomlinson attended The Hayfield School and later Hall Cross School (now Hall Cross Academy), both located in Doncaster. He failed his first year of A levels at the Hayfield School and ended up going to Hall Cross School and starting his A levels again. He had a number of jobs, including positions at a Vue cinema and at Doncaster Rovers football stadium as a waiter in the hospitality suites. At Hall Cross, Tomlinson appeared in several musical productions, which gave him a sense of ambition and determination. Taking the lead role of Danny Zuko in the Hall Cross musical production of Grease motivated him to audition for the British singing competition The X Factor.

== Career ==
=== Early career ===
Tomlinson, along with two of his siblings, had extra roles in Fat Friends. He met actor James Corden on the set, who later became his friend. After Fat Friends, he attended an acting school in Barnsley. He had small parts in an ITV drama film If I Had You and as an extra in BBC's Waterloo Road.

Tomlinson was a singer in a school band called "The Rogue" for two years, covering acts such as Oasis, Blink-182 and Green Day. He was kicked out from the band at age 14, due to the guitarist wanting to be the singer. Tomlinson has cited this experience as another motivation for him to audition for The X Factor. He auditioned for The X Factor in 2009, but failed to progress past the producer's audition. He decided to return the following year.

=== 2010–2016: The X Factor and One Direction ===
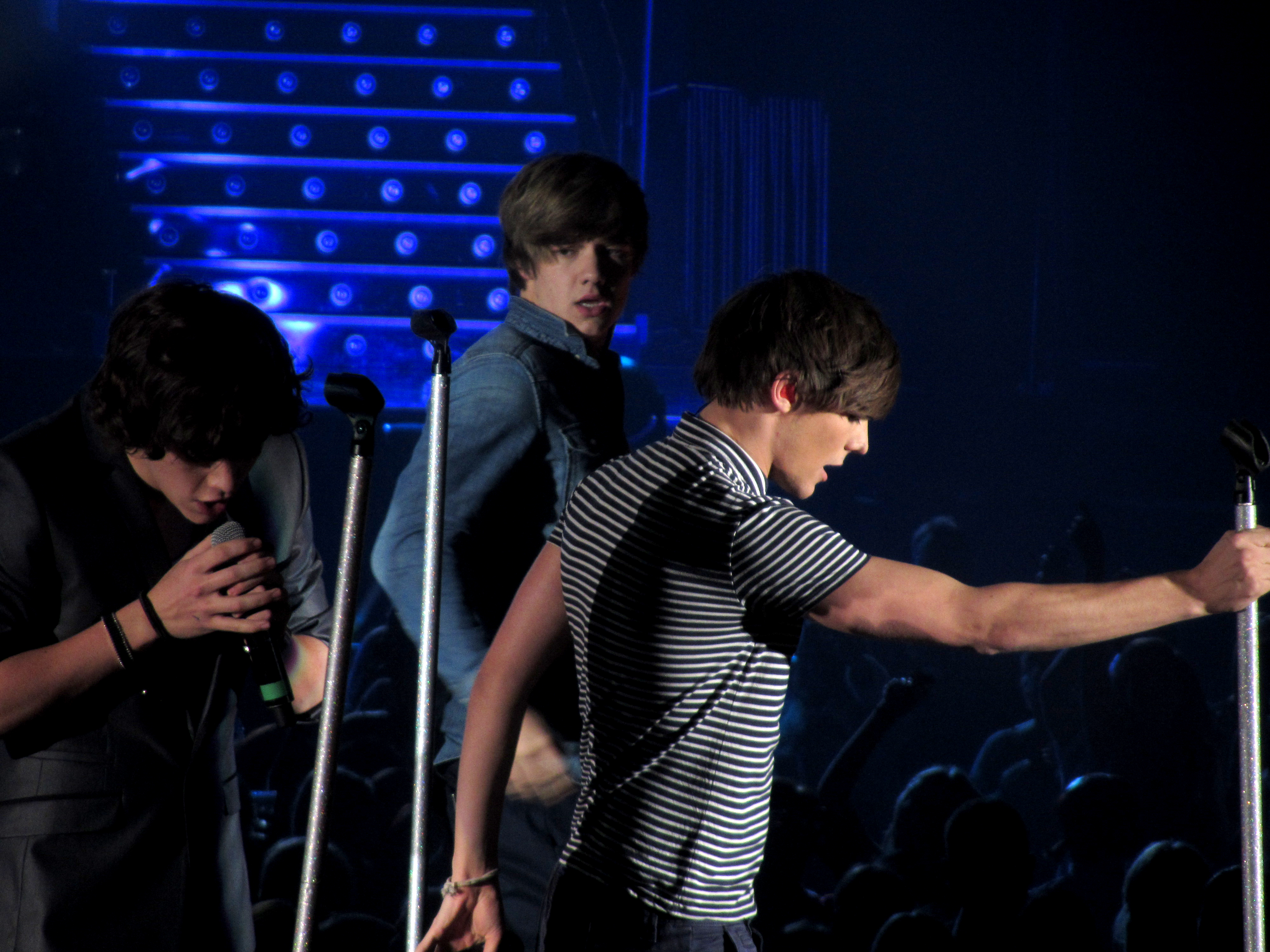
Tomlinson (right) with One Direction bandmates Harry Styles (left) and Liam Payne (centre) in the X Factor Live Tour in Glasgow

In 2010, Tomlinson auditioned for the seventh series of The X Factor in front of main judges Simon Cowell and Louis Walsh and guest judge Nicole Scherzinger. He sang a rendition of "Elvis Ain't Dead" by Scouting for Girls before Cowell requested he sing another song. He then sang "Hey There Delilah" by the Plain White T's and received three yeses from the judges, sending him through to bootcamp. He failed to progress to the "Boys" category at the end of the final bootcamp stage of the competition at Wembley Arena, London, in July 2010. However, after a suggestion from Scherzinger, he was put together with Niall Horan, Zayn Malik, Liam Payne and Harry Styles to form a five-piece boy band called One Direction, thus qualifying for the "Groups" category at judges' houses, mentored by Cowell.

Cowell chose to put them through to the live shows and later commented that their debut performance singing "Torn" convinced him that the group "were confident, fun, like a gang of friends and kind of fearless as well." The group became Cowell's last act in the competition and quickly gained popularity in the UK. One Direction finished in third place, following which it was confirmed that the band had been signed by Cowell to a reported £2 million Syco Music record contract.

In September 2011, One Direction released their debut single "What Makes You Beautiful". A global and commercial success, it reached number one in the UK. That November, their debut studio album Up All Night was released in the UK and Ireland. Released internationally in 2012, One Direction became the first UK group to have their debut album reach number one in the USA. Following the album's release, they headlined the Up All Night Tour. In September 2012, the band released the song "Live While We're Young", the lead single from their second album. Another single, "Little Things", spawned the band's second number one single in the UK. Two months later, One Direction's second album, Take Me Home, was released. Reaching number one on the Billboard 200, the group became the first boy band in US chart history to record two number-one albums in the same calendar year and first group since 2008 to record two number-one albums in the same year.

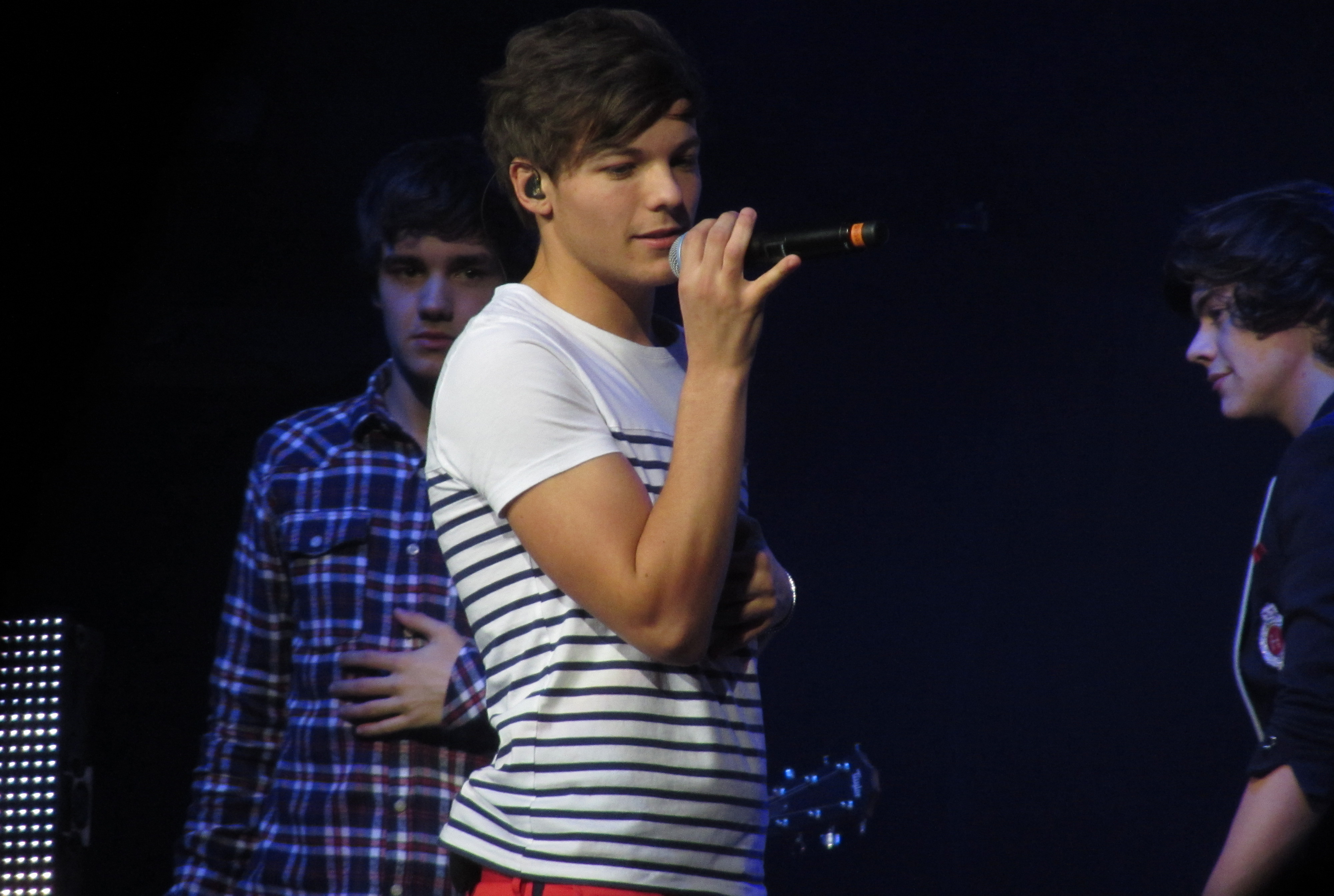
Tomlinson in Glasgow, 2012

On 25 November 2013, One Direction released Midnight Memories, their third studio album, which became the best-selling album worldwide in 2013 with 4 million copies sold globally. "Best Song Ever", the album's lead single, is their highest charting single in the US to date. In April 2014, the band began their third headlining concert tour, and their first all-stadium tour, the Where We Are Tour. Madison Square Garden tickets, as reported by The Hollywood Reporter, sold out in ten minutes, and more shows were added due to "overwhelming demand". Performing 69 shows in Europe, North America, and South America, the band averaged 49,848 attendees per show. Grossing over $290 million, the tour was the highest-grossing tour of 2014.

In November 2014, One Direction's fourth album Four was released, making it the last album to feature Malik. Singles included "Steal My Girl" and "Night Changes", both of which achieved platinum status. The album sold 387,000 copies in its first week in the United States, becoming the second-largest debut of the year. One Direction became the only group in the history of the Billboard 200 albums chart to have their first four albums debut at number one. In support of the album, they set off on the On the Road Again Tour, grossing over $200 million. In November 2015, One Direction's fifth album, Made in the A.M., was released. The album reached number one in multiple countries, including the UK, and reached number two on the US Billboard 200.

Often being described as a part of the new "British Invasion" in the United States, the group have been characterised as one of the most successful music acts in history, with their popularity and fan hysteria often compared to Beatlemania. One of the best-selling boy bands in history with over 70 million records sold, the band was worth over $1 billion through various ventures, including merchandise and concert sales. Tomlinson, alongside the rest of One Direction, voiced himself in 2016 Family Guy episode "Run, Chris, Run". The group went on an indefinite hiatus in 2016 to pursue individual projects. Tomlinson recalled feeling "mortified" about the band's split, remarking that it felt like "another loss". Tomlinson stated that he did not envision himself as a solo artist at the time, and argued against the split when the band discussed it. In 2022, Tomlinson stated the split allowed him to find "new musical purpose".

=== 2015–2018: Television endeavours and first solo projects ===
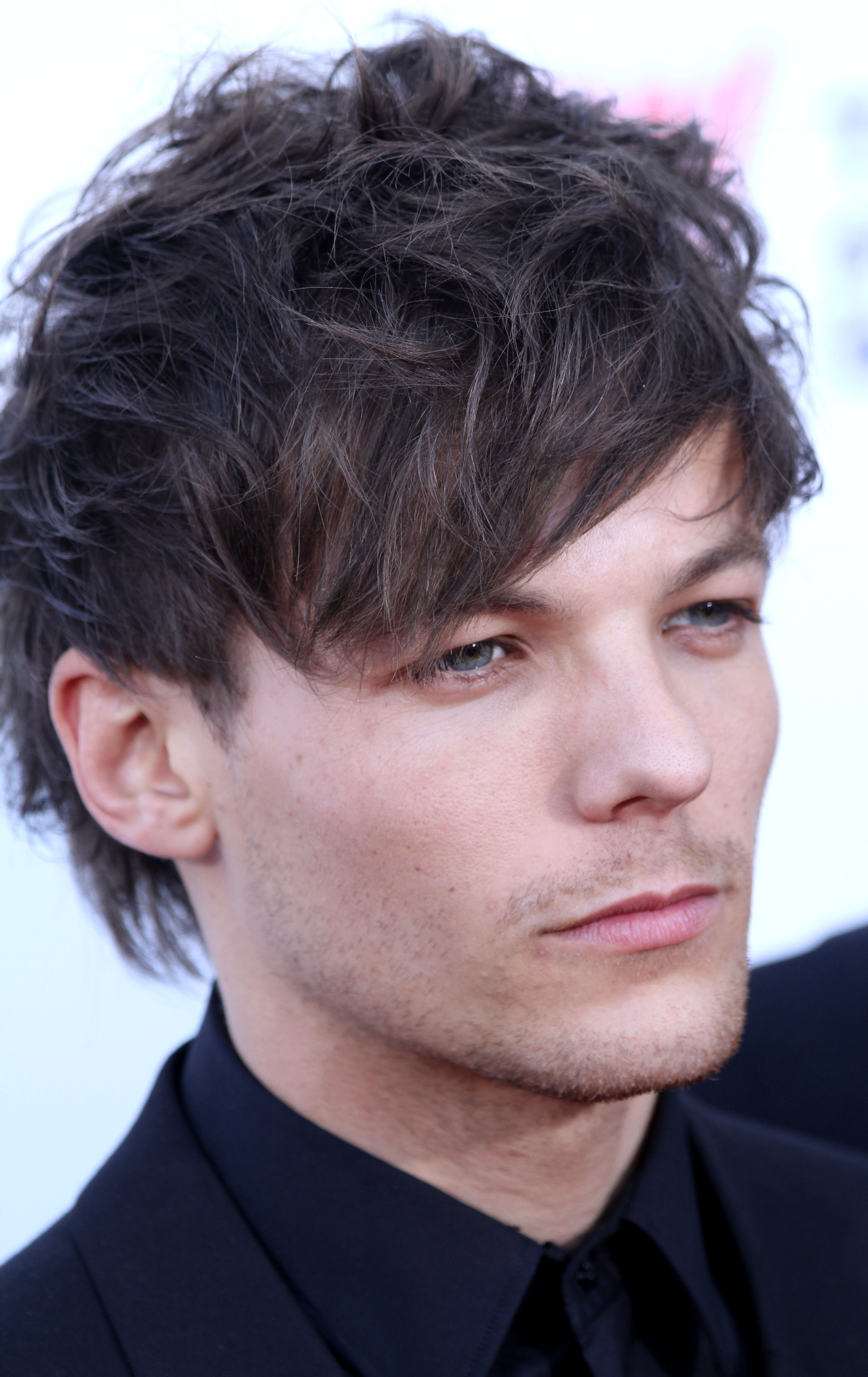
Tomlinson at the 2014 ARIA Music Awards

Tomlinson again appeared on The X Factor during the twelfth series in 2015, assisting Simon Cowell with his decisions in the "Over 27s" category during the judges' houses stage. Tomlinson indicated his interest in becoming a permanent X Factor judge during the group's hiatus.

He was later featured as a guest judge in the eleventh season of America's Got Talent. Tomlinson released his debut single "Just Hold On" on 10 December 2016, a collaborative effort with the American DJ Steve Aoki. Tomlinson and Aoki performed the song live for the first time on The X Factor thirteenth series final on the day of its release. A few days prior to the performance, Tomlinson's mother died. He dedicated the song in her name and has considered that moment the hardest of his career and his life. The single debuted and peaked at number 2 on the UK Singles Chart and reached number 1 on the Billboard Dance/Electronic Digital Song Sales chart.

In July 2017, Tomlinson released the single "Back to You" featuring Bebe Rexha and Digital Farm Animals. The song peaked at number 8 on the UK Singles Chart and number 40 on the Billboard Hot 100 chart. The music video for the song was filmed in Doncaster, his natal city, at the Doncaster Rovers F.C Stadium. That same year, he appeared on Debrett's list of the most influential people in the United Kingdom, and had signed a record deal with Epic Records. In October 2017, Tomlinson released a promotional single "Just Like You" that peaked at number 99 on UK Official Charts, which was followed by his second solo single "Miss You" in December 2017 that peaked at number 39 on the UK Charts.

Tomlinson became a judge on the fifteenth series of The X Factor alongside Cowell and fellow new judges Robbie Williams and Ayda Field, announced in July 2018. He mentored the "Boys" category, choosing Dalton Harris, Armstrong Martins, Brendan Murray, and Anthony Russell to go through to the live shows, with Harris winning.

=== 2019–2022: Walls and Faith in the Future ===
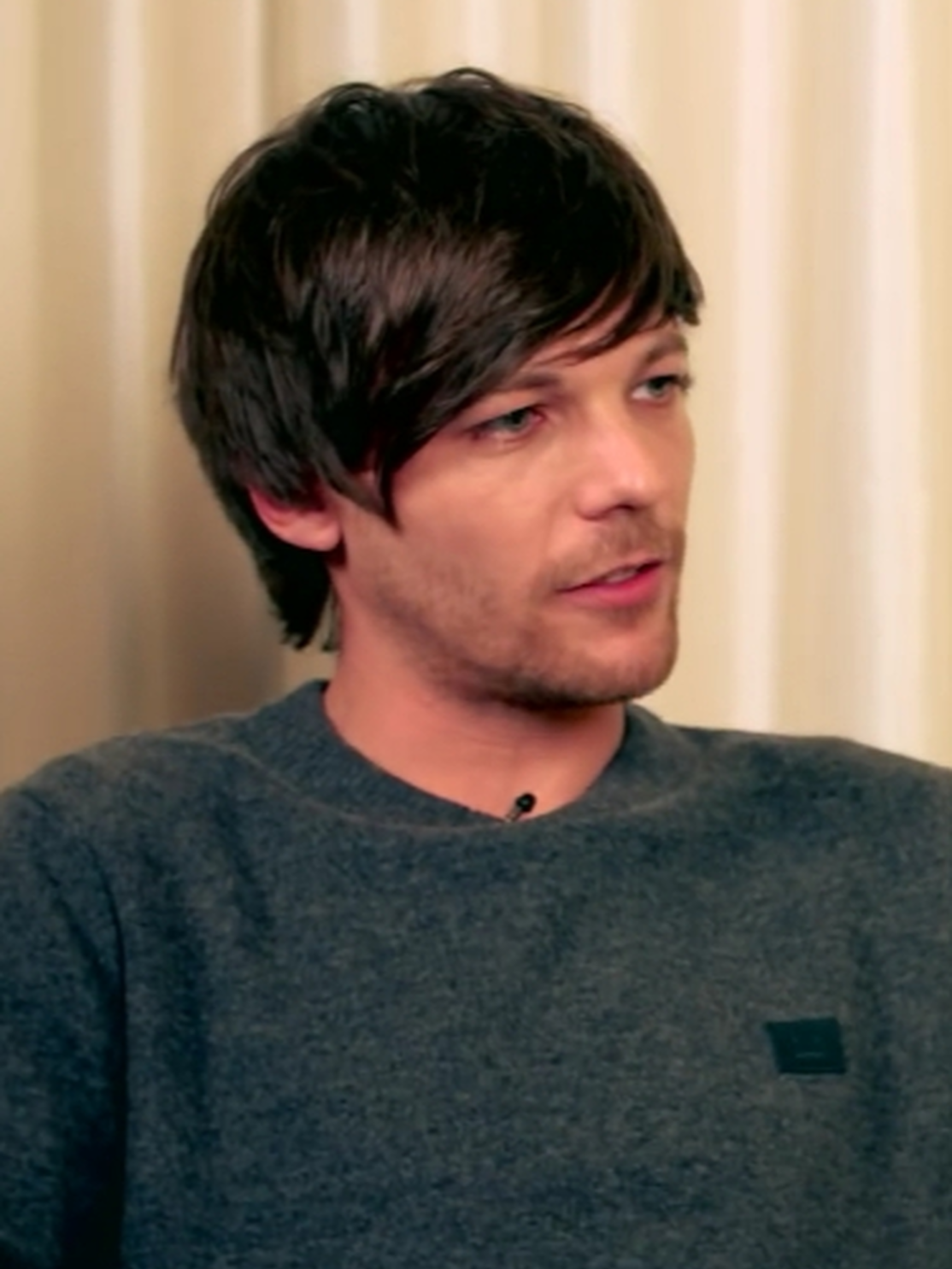
Tomlinson talking with MTV Music in 2019

In February 2019, it was announced that Tomlinson had signed with newly-relaunched Arista Records; his first release under the label, "Two of Us", was released on 7 March 2019. The song is a tribute to his mother. Tomlinson released a single, "Kill My Mind", on 5 September 2019. Described as a 90s inspired indie pop record, the song received generally positive reviews. The music video of "Kill My Mind" was released on 13 September, and was directed by Charlie Lightening.

On 23 October 2019, Tomlinson released the third single, "We Made It", alongside an announcement of his debut album Walls, scheduled for release on 31 January 2020. Furthermore, Tomlinson announced that he would embark on the Louis Tomlinson World Tour spanning over five months and visiting twenty countries. On 23 November, Tomlinson released "Don't Let It Break Your Heart", the fourth single from his debut album. On 17 January, he released "Walls", the fifth and the final single from his debut album. The music video, which was shot in Morocco, was released on 20 January.

Walls was released on 31 January 2020, debuting at number 4 on the UK Albums Chart, and number 9 on the Billboard 200 chart with 35,000 sales, which marked the first time in almost nine years an album for Arista Records hit the top 10 on the chart. Tomlinson was set to embark on his first solo tour, the Louis Tomlinson World Tour, in 2020, however postponed a majority of dates due to the COVID-19 pandemic. In February 2022, Tomlinson resumed the tour in Dallas, and the tour concluded in September of that year.

In July 2020, Tomlinson announced that he had parted ways with Syco Music; he further announced he had begun writing his next album. Tomlinson held a digital concert Live From London on 12 December 2020, which sold over 160 thousand tickets, breaking the Guinness World Record as the most livestreamed concert for a male solo artist of the year and the third overall. The proceeds went to various charities such as FareShare, Crew Nation, Bluebell Wood Children's Hospice, Stagehand, as well as to tour crew who were struggling financially due to the COVID-19 pandemic.

In May 2021, Tomlinson announced that he had signed a global deal with BMG to release his second album. In August 2022, tracks from his then-upcoming album were leaked, with Tomlinson saying he was "gutted". On 31 August, Tomlinson announced that his second album Faith in the Future would be released on 11 November 2022. The album's lead single, "Bigger Than Me", was released on 1 September. Faith in the Future became Tomlinson's first solo album to debut at number 1 on the UK Albums Chart. In the US, the record debuted at number 5 on the Billboard 200.

=== 2023–present: All of Those Voices and How Did I Get Here? ===
Tomlinson's documentary All of Those Voices, which describes his personal journey of transitioning from a member of One Direction to a solo musician, released in limited theatres on 22 March 2023. The documentary was directed by Charlie Lightening. The film became available on the streaming platform Paramount+ in October 2023. Tomlinson's second world tour, Faith in the Future World Tour, commenced in North America in May 2023. Asian concert dates in mid to late April were originally announced; however, in early April it was announced that they were cancelled, citing "unforeseen circumstances". He performed in North America and Europe in 2023 and Asia, Australia and Latin America in 2024. In November 2023, shortly after performing in The O2 Arena, Tomlinson was nominated for the Live Act Award at the Rolling Stone UK Awards.

Tomlinson released his surprise album Live in April 2024, featuring live performances from his Louis Tomlinson World Tour and Faith in the Future World Tour. The album features recordings from 15 different shows in 15 cities. Upon the conclusion of his second tour, Tomlinson embarked on a summer 2024 festival circuit, including the Main Square Festival, Pinkpop, Ruisrock, Santander Music, Untold Festival, Sziget Festival, Frequency Festival, Victorious Festival, and Lollapalooza Berlin. In 2024, Tomlinson won "Artist of the Year" at the inaugural Northern Music Awards. Later that year, Tomlinson was featured in Adidas documentary Under The Tongue about the origins of Adidas Predator.

On 30 September 2025, Tomlinson released "Lemonade" as the lead single from his then-upcoming third studio album, How Did I Get Here?. It was followed by "Palaces", released on 14 November, and finally "Imposter" on 20 January. How Did I Get Here? was released on 23 January 2026. It received mostly positive reviews from critics. Helen Brown for The Independent complimented Tomlinson's mixing of "indie guitar influences" into "sunnier, springier, synthier poptimism". Neil Z. Yeung for AllMusic called the album "highly enjoyable", and Will Richards for Rolling Stone called the album "bright and bold", giving it a final rating of 4/5. In a negative review, Will Hodgkinson for The Times criticised the "inoffensive but bland" nature of the album. On Metacritic, it received an aggregate score of 69, from 8 critic reviews. The album debuted at number 1 on the UK albums charts, Tomlinson's second number 1 following Faith in the Future. To support the album, Tomlinson will commence on the 2026 How Did We Get Here? World Tour. In October 2025, it was announced that Tomlinson would reunite with former band member Malik to star in a documentary series distributed by Netflix and produced by Campfire Studios. Directed by Nicola Marsh, the pair would go on a road trip together, and discuss life, loss, and fatherhood. In April 2026, it was announced that the series was cancelled after Malik allegedly punched Tomlinson, resulting in a concussion. On 4 and 5 October, Tomlinson hosted and performed at the annual Away From Home Festival, held in Cooperstown, New York.

== Initiatives ==
=== Producing ===
In 2015, Tomlinson created his own record label, Triple Strings Ltd, as an imprint of his then label Syco Music. It was reported he was working with Simon Cowell to create a girl band and held auditions in 2015. He confirmed the news speaking to Noisey in 2017. In 2021, having left Syco Music, he expressed interest in starting his own musical management company and owning a record label, commenting that the imprint did not fulfill his aim at nurturing prospective artists. Triple Strings Ltd remained a dormant company as of December 2022.

In 2023, it was announced that Tomlinson, under his production company 78 Productions, would co-invest into Waiting for the Rain with Strap Originals, the debut album by the English singer Andrew Cushin who supported the North America and Europe legs of the Faith in the Future World Tour. 78 productions also produced Tomlinson's documentary film All of Those Voices (2023).

=== The Away From Home Festival ===
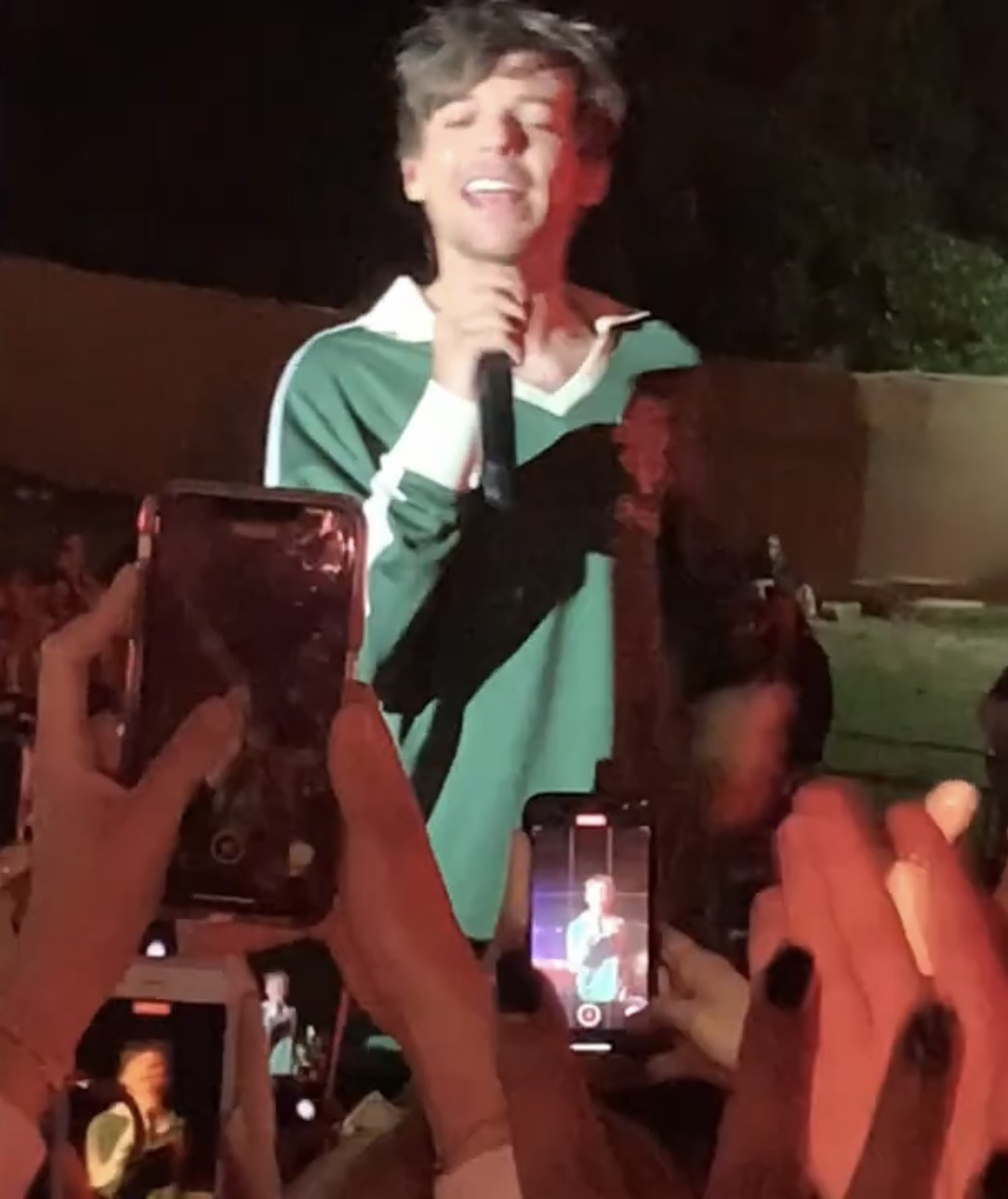
Tomlinson wearing 28 at the 2021 Away From Home Festival

Tomlinson founded and curated the indie music festival Away From Home Festival. In July 2021, he announced that he would perform for free to celebrate the return of live music after the shut down because of the COVID pandemic. The first edition took place on 30 August 2021 at Crystal Palace Bowl, London. The lineup included such bands as The Snuts and Bilk. The second annual edition of the festival took place on 30 August 2022 at Marenostrum Music Castle Park in Málaga on Costa del Sol, featuring artists such as The Vaccines, Sun Room, STONE and Voodoos. The festival attracted 17 thousand attendees and received positive reviews. The third Away From Home Festival took place in Camaiore, Italy on 19 August 2023 and was supported by the likes of Blossoms, The Cribs, Andrew Cushin and HotWax. The fourth Away From Home Festival, and the first outside Europe, took place in Mérida, Mexico, supported by Kevin Kaarl, DMA's, and Dylan. The fifth took place in Cooperstown, New York, in October 2025.

=== 28 (brand) ===
On 28 August 2023, Tomlinson officially launched his "28" streetwear-inspired unisex clothing line. The brand has also been referred to as 28 Clothing and 28 Official Programme (28OP). Tomlinson described creating the brand as fulfilling a "creative itch that [he] wanted to scratch". In July 2023, actor Kit Connor wore a 28 piece in a photoshoot for The Guardian.

Tomlinson states that 28 is separate from his personal merchandise and stands "on its own two feet without his face attached". He had been interested in fashion since childhood, and toyed with the idea of creating a brand for over a decade. The White Rose of York is incorporated into the branding, as Tomlinson is from Yorkshire.

== Artistry ==
Tomlinson has been praised for his lyricism and songwriting. He has the most writing credits in One Direction out of all the band members, with songwriting credits on the majority of the songs on Midnight Memories, Four, and Made in the A.M., and on a total of 38 songs across the band's discography. Savan Kotecha credits Tomlinson with "leading the charge" in shifting 1D's music towards a more mature sound.

Tomlinson's early influences and favourite artists included Robbie Williams, The Fray, Green Day, and Ed Sheeran. In an interview with Now magazine, he said: "I've always loved Robbie. He's just so cheeky, he can get away with anything. His performances are unbelievable." He described Sheeran as "phenomenal".

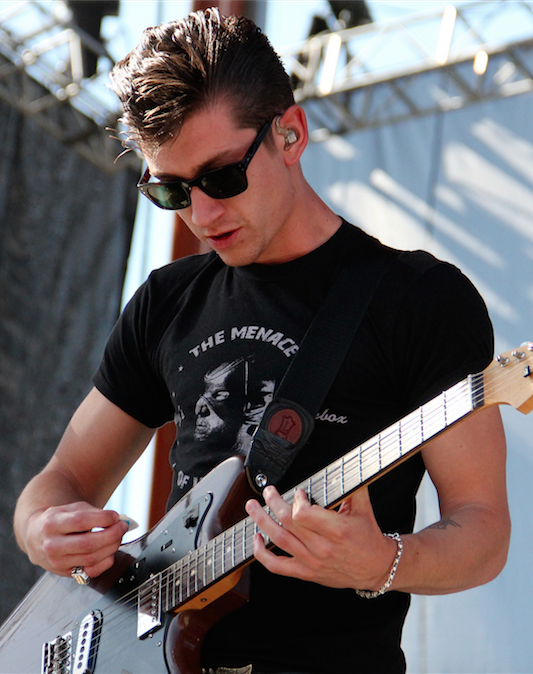
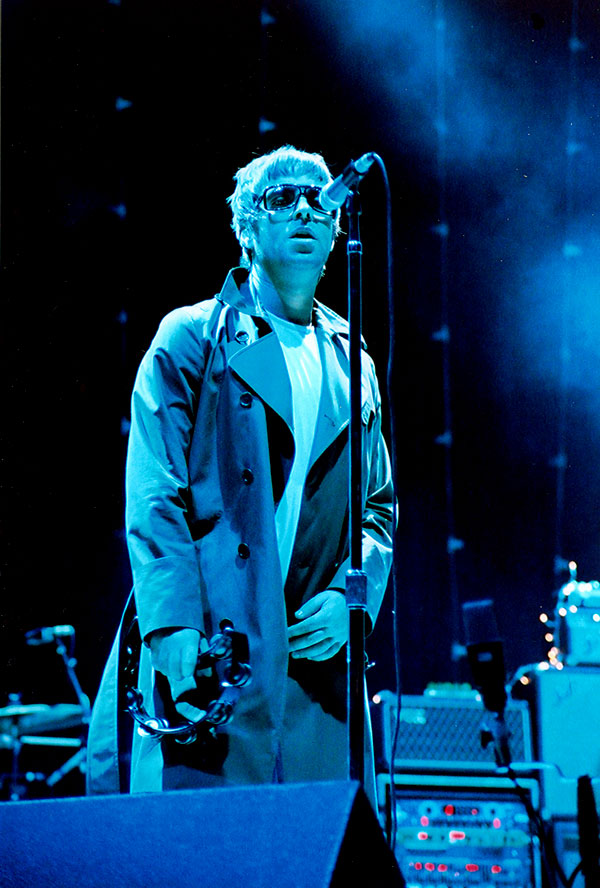
Arctic Monkeys and Oasis both influenced Tomlinson and his debut album.

For his solo music, Tomlinson's first few singles were mainly pop, before shifting towards a rockier sound with focus on instrumentation. In an interview with BBC Music following the release of "Miss You", Tomlinson said his debut album is lyrically inspired by the bands Arctic Monkeys and Oasis. Tomlinson also cited an admiration for and inspiration from Sam Fender, Amy Winehouse and Catfish and the Bottlemen. On a review of "Kill My Mind", MTV News wrote "Louis Tomlinson sounds like the Britpop star he was born to be." His music style has been referred to as indie rock, soft rock, indie pop, Britpop, pop punk, pop rock, pop, as well as punk rock and funk.

During the COVID-19 lockdown, Tomlinson became inspired by the Red Hot Chili Peppers' concert film. His second album Faith in the Future was created with live performances in mind. Saskia Postema of Euphoria described the album as "more confident and energetic", balanced between "rock-heavy and even some synth/funk-inspired tracks", such as "Written All Over Your Face". The album saw Tomlinson revisit dance music, as the DMA's album The Glow gave him a new perspective on the genre. DMA's had come to him for advice on The Glow, and Johnny Took praised his "great ear for pop music – and music in general". He also brought more artists than professional songwriters into the writing room.

Lyrically, while Tomlinson's first album is heavily based on his personal experiences, his second delves more into conceptual, metaphorical, and creative storytelling, though not without emotional honesty, and broader ideas of love than solely romantic. Touching on topics such as grief, emotional pain, and times of difficulty and uncertainty, Tomlinson made a point of writing with optimism; "even when it gets a little bit darker emotionally, there is that hope at the end of it", he told Billboard.

== Football ==
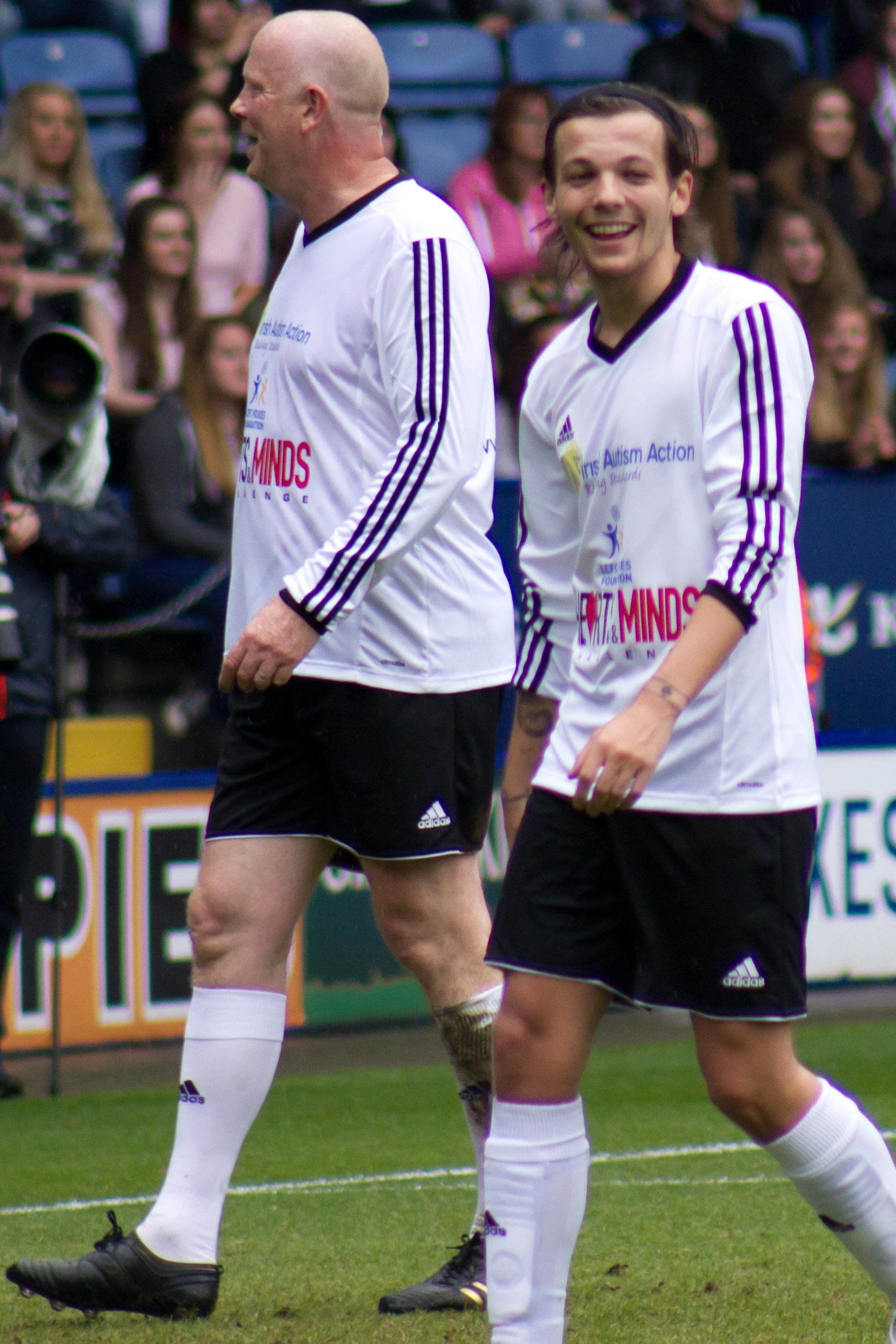
Tomlinson with Mark Wright at Niall Horan Charity Football Challenge, 2014

Tomlinson, experienced with football as a player and manager of his own pub team Three Horseshoes, had agreed to play in a charity game at the Keepmoat Stadium in his home town of Doncaster to raise money for the Bluebell Wood Charity. His performance impressed professional football club Doncaster Rovers, and after the game the club invited him to join on non-contract terms. Tomlinson was a part of the club's reserve team. He was given the squad number 28 for the 2013–14 season. Tomlinson stated the signing was "unbelievable", having been a lifelong fan of the club.

On 3 September 2013, it was announced that Tomlinson would make his debut for Doncaster's Reserve team in their Central League fixture against the Scunthorpe United reserve team on 18 September. Doncaster announced that despite the fixture being a reserve game they would set up a special ticket line for the match. On 8 September, Tomlinson played for Celtic in another charity match organised to raise money for the Stiliyan Petrov Cancer Foundation. During the game Tomlinson was injured following a tackle by Aston Villa and England striker Gabriel Agbonlahor, and was substituted. As a result of injuries sustained in the match, Tomlinson had to pull out of the Scunthorpe match, relegating himself to the bench.

In his rescheduled debut for Doncaster's reserve side in the Central League, he came in as a 65th-minute substitute in a 0–0 game against Rotherham United on 26 February 2014, a charity match in aid of Bluebell Wood Children's Hospice selling more than 4,000 tickets. Tomlinson later participated in a charity football match hosted by bandmate Niall Horan on 26 May 2014, at the King Power Stadium.

On 19 June 2014, Tomlinson and former chairman John Ryan announced they planned a takeover over as joint-owners of Doncaster Rovers. It was later announced the takeover had fallen through after they failed to crowdfund the £2 million target. Tomlinson returned to Celtic Park on 7 September 2014 to take part in the MAESTRIO Charity Match, having been recruited to play for Rio Ferdinand's All-Stars against Paul McStay's Maestros. The match was attended by a crowd of around 25,000 with proceeds benefiting several charities including UNICEF, War Child, the Celtic Foundation and the Rio Ferdinand Foundation.

== Philanthropy ==
Tomlinson has been involved in charity work throughout his career. He co-hosted a charity ball with bandmate Liam Payne and held by Believe in Magic, an organisation that supported terminally ill children. Both Tomlinson and Payne got in a bidding war at the charity ball that resulted in Tomlinson donating £10,000 for Payne's face to be painted. He personally donated £2 million to Believe in Magic, while collectively he and Payne donated over £5 million. He has been involved with Bluebell Wood Children's Hospice and was one their patrons. A tweet by Tomlinson helped to promote the work of a cancer charity, Niamh's Next Step, in memory of a girl diagnosed with neuroblastoma.

In 2013, One Direction released their song for the BBC Comic Relief charity campaign, One Way or Another (Teenage Kicks). Louis dyed his hair red for the live performance of the song on BBC 1 on 15th march 2013.

In April 2016, Tomlinson was announced to be joining the Soccer Aid 2016 star line-up, a biennial fundraiser for the children's organisation UNICEF. He played for the England squad alongside Robbie Williams, Olly Murs, Paddy McGuinness, Jack Whitehall, Marvin Humes, John Bishop and others on 5 June 2016. Tomlinson played against his bandmate Niall Horan, who appeared for the Rest of the World team. In 2017, Tomlinson was featured in a charity single fundraising for victims of the Grenfell Tower fire. Tomlinson shared donation links, made donations himself, and voiced his support for the Black Lives Matter movement in May and June 2020. He attended the George Floyd protests in London with his then-girlfriend Eleanor Calder. In 2020, Tomlinson sold 160,000 tickets for a charity livestream, giving the profits to FareShare, Crew Nation, Bluebell Wood Children's Hospice, and his touring crew. Tomlinson participated in the 2025 season of Soccer Aid.

== Personal life ==
Tomlinson began dating Eleanor Calder in late 2011. They split in March 2015, reunited in early 2017, and broke up again in 2022, as announced in January 2023. In 2015, it was announced that Tomlinson was expecting a child with Briana Jungwirth, an American stylist. Their son Freddie was born in 2016. Tomlinson was in a relationship with American actress Danielle Campbell from November 2015 to December 2016. Tomlinson has been in a relationship with television personality Zara McDermott since early 2025, publicly confirming the romance via a social media post in August.

In December 2016, Tomlinson's mother, Johannah Deakin, died of leukaemia at the age of 43. In March 2019, Tomlinson's sister Félicité died from an accidental overdose at the age of 18.

He purchased a house in Hollywood Hills in 2016, and sold it for $6.4 million in 2020. As of 2020, Tomlinson resides in London. In November 2022, Tomlinson broke his upper right arm in a fall after a performance in New York. He underwent surgery, and his in-person promotional events that month were rescheduled for December.

Since One Direction's conception, Tomlinson has been subject to rumours and speculation of a romantic relationship between him and bandmate Harry Styles by conspiracy theorists known as Larries. Tomlinson has denied the rumours on multiple occasions throughout the years, calling it that "biggest load of bullshit [he's] ever heard."

=== Legal issues ===
On 4 March 2017, an altercation at Los Angeles International Airport involving a paparazzo and aggressive fans waiting for Tomlinson resulted in the singer being detained by airport security. He was then arrested and taken into custody by the Los Angeles Police Department. He was initially charged with a misdemeanour and posted a bail of $20,000 soon after. The matter was reportedly resolved by April 2017 and charges against Tomlinson were dropped. Tomlinson's lawyer Martin Singer said in a statement to Rolling Stone, "The paparazzi provoked and caused the altercation with Louis at the airport this morning. This is not the first or the last time that a paparazzi [sic] has created an altercation with a celebrity."

== Discography ==
Studio albums

- Walls (2020)
- Faith in the Future (2022)
- How Did I Get Here? (2026)

== Filmography ==
Key
†	Denotes films that have not yet been released

=== Film ===
Year	Title	Role	Notes	Ref.
2013	One Direction: This Is Us	Himself	Documentary concert film	
2014	Where We Are – The Concert Film	Himself	Concert film	
2023	All of Those Voices	Himself	Documentary film	

=== Television ===
Year	Title	Role	Notes	Ref.
2005	Fat Friends	Extra	Television series	
2006	If I Had You	Extra	Television film	
2006	Waterloo Road	Extra	Television series	
2012	iCarly	Himself	Episode: "iGo One Direction"	
2015	The X Factor	Guest judge	Series 12	
2016	Family Guy	Himself	Episode: "Run, Chris, Run"	
2016	America's Got Talent	Guest judge	Season 11	
2018	The X Factor	Judge	Series 15	
2026	TBA †	Himself	Television series; filming	

== Tours ==
Headlining

- Louis Tomlinson World Tour (2020–2022)
- Faith in the Future World Tour (2023–2024)
- How Did We Get Here? World Tour (2026)

== Awards and nominations ==
Year	Award	Category	Result	Ref.
2017
2017	Radio Disney Music Awards	Best Collaboration	Nominated	
2017	Teen Choice Awards	Choice Music: Collaboration – "Just Hold On"	Won	
2017	Teen Choice Awards	Choice Electronic/Dance Song	Nominated	
2017	Teen Choice Awards	Choice Male Hottie	Nominated	
2017	MTV Europe Music Awards	Best UK Act (Note: Socially voted category)	Won	
2018	IARA Awards	Best Male Artist	Nominated	
2018	iHeartRadio Music Awards	Best Solo Breakout	Won	
2018	Teen Choice Awards	Choice Male Artist	Won	
2019	National Television Awards	TV Judge	Nominated	
2019	Billboard Music Awards	Top Social Artist	Nominated	
2019	Teen Choice Awards	Choice Single:Male Artist	Won	
2020	TDY Awards	Album of the Year – Walls	Won	
2020	TDY Awards	Biggest Crush	Nominated	
2020	iHeartRadio Music Awards	Best Fan Army	Nominated	
2023	Rolling Stone UK Awards	Best Live Act	Nominated	
2024	Northern Music Awards	Artist of the Year	Won	
