= Stop This Flame =

2020 single by Celeste

Single by Celeste

from the album Not Your Muse
- Released: 9 January 2020
- Recorded: March 2019
- Genre: R&B; jazz
- Length: 3:29
- Label: Polydor
- Songwriters: Jamie Hartman; Celeste Epiphany Waite; Nina Simone
- Producers: Jamie Hartman; John Hill

Celeste singles chronology
| "Strange" (2019) | "Stop This Flame" (2020) | "I Can See the Change" (2020) |

"Stop This Flame" is a song by British singer and songwriter Celeste. The single was released on 9 January 2020 through Both Sides and Polydor Records as the second single from her debut studio album Not Your Muse. It was written by Celeste and Jamie Hartman, who produced the track with John Hill. The song samples Nina Simone's version of "Sinner Man" and Simone is credited as a co-composer.

The song was released following Celeste's win of BBC's annual music poll Sound of 2020. It became her first-ever solo single, and second single overall (since "Sing That Song" with Tieks), to chart in her home country, spending 8 weeks on the UK Singles Chart. From September 2020 to August 2025, it was the theme song for Sky Sports' coverage of the Premier League. The song is also featured on the soundtrack of FIFA 21, Dream League Soccer 2024, and was used by both Peloton and Royal Mail for TV advertisements in 2021.

== Background and composition ==
"Stop This Flame" was Celeste's first single of 2020, the year in which she was critically tipped for success by many major publications. Celeste told Dork, "In essence, 'Stop This Flame' is a song about seeing it through to the end. Whether it’s about not letting go of love, not letting go of a dream or stridently coming through some form of adversity. The song has always evoked those feelings within me.” She told Apple Music, "For me when I sing the song, it's about like never ending determination to get that point." The song is "driven by an insistent minor-key piano vamp."

== Music video ==
The song's music video was directed by Leonn Ward and shot in New Orleans. It premiered on YouTube on 7 February 2020, and was later nominated for Best British R&B/Soul Video at the 2020 UK Music Video Awards.

== Critical reception ==
The single was described by Robin Murray of Clash as "a piano-driven stomper that carries a level of euphoria that rivals club culture", whilst comparing it to "You've Got the Love" by Florence and The Machine. Peter Helman from Stereogum described as "a catchy and vaguely jazz-indebted uptempo R&B song". The song was described by The Times as "up-tempo, piano-driven Amy Winehouse".

== Credits and personnel ==
Credits adapted from Tidal:

- Celeste Epiphany Waite: vocals, composer, lyricist
- Jamie Hartman: producer, composer, lyricist, bass programming, guitar, Mellotron, organ, percussion, piano, recording engineer, strings, synthesizer
- John Hill: producer, bass, drums, guitar, programming
- Nina Simone: composer, lyricist
- Jeremie Inhaber: assistant remix engineer
- Robin Florent: assistant remix engineer
- Scott Desmaris: assistant remix engineer
- Blake Mares: engineer
- Rob Cohen: engineer
- John Davis: mastering engineer
- Chris Galland: mixing engineer
- Manny Marroquin: mixing engineer
- Rafa Padilla: percussion
- Davide Rossi: strings
- Stuart Crichton: synthesizer programming

== Charts ==
=== Weekly charts ===
| Chart (2020–2021) | Peak position |
|---|---|
| Belgium (Ultratop 50 Flanders) | 5 |
| Belgium Urban (Ultratop Flanders) | 2 |
| Belgium (Ultratop 50 Wallonia) | 6 |
| Czech Republic Airplay (ČNS IFPI) | 7 |
| Denmark Airplay (Tracklisten) | 17 |
| Euro Digital Song Sales (Billboard) | 19 |
| Hungary (Rádiós Top 40) | 21 |
| Iceland (Tónlistinn) | 27 |
| Ireland (IRMA) | 81 |
| Netherlands (Dutch Top 40) | 23 |
| Netherlands (Mega Top 50) | 2 |
| Netherlands (Single Top 100) | 80 |
| Scottish Singles Sales (Official Charts) | 12 |
| Slovenia (SloTop50) | 44 |
| UK Singles (Official Charts) | 47 |

=== Year-end charts ===
| Chart (2020) | Position |
|---|---|
| Belgium (Ultratop Flanders) | 17 |
| Belgium (Ultratop Wallonia) | 26 |
| Hungary (Rádiós Top 40) | 64 |
| Netherlands (Dutch Top 40) | 81 |

== Certifications ==
| Region | Certification | Certified units/sales |
|---|---|---|
| France (SNEP) | Gold | 100,000^{‡} |
| United Kingdom (BPI) | Gold | 400,000^{‡} |
^{‡} Sales+streaming figures based on certification alone.
