= Sean Douglas (songwriter) =

American songwriter and record producer

- Born: Sean Maxwell Douglas; May 27, 1983 (age 43); Los Angeles, California, U.S.
- Other name: Sean Keaton
- Education: Washington University in St. Louis
- Occupations: Record producer; songwriter
- Spouse: Rachel Bartov (m. 2014)
- Children: 2
- Parents: Michael Keaton (father); Caroline McWilliams (mother)
- Musical career
- Genres: Pop; dance; rock; country; urban
- Labels: Warner Chappell Music; Sony ATV Publishing

Sean Maxwell Douglas (born May 27, 1983) is an American songwriter and record producer.

== Life and career ==
Douglas is the son of actors Michael Keaton and Caroline McWilliams. He attended Washington University in St. Louis.

A Grammy Award-nominee, he co-wrote Thomas Rhett's "Die a Happy Man", which won the ACM Award for Single of the Year, the Billboard Music Award for Top Country Song, the CMA Award for Single of the Year and the BMI Award for Song of the Year. The song, released in 2016, was also nominated for the Grammy Award for Best Country Song. Douglas also worked on Lizzo's "Like A Girl" and “Soulmate” from her Grammy-winning album Cuz I Love You.

Signed to Warner Chappell Music, and previously signed to Sony/ATV Music Publishing, Douglas co-wrote his first Top 10 single, Demi Lovato's “Heart Attack,” in 2013. He later wrote for Jessie J, Fifth Harmony, Nick Jonas, Chris Brown, Madonna, Andy Grammer, The Chainsmokers, Kesha, Selena Gomez, Dan + Shay, Kristen Wiig, and Sia.

== Personal life ==
He and his wife, Rachel Bartov, were married in 2014. Together, they have one son (b. 2017) and one daughter (b. 2020). They live in Los Angeles, California.

== Selected discography ==
For discography, he is credited as writer unless otherwise noted.

Select discography of Sean Douglas
Year	Artist	Song	Album	Notes
2012	Cady Groves	"This Little Girl"	—N/a	
2012	Plug In Stereo	You're on My Mind	Patience EP	Also producer
2012	Plug In Stereo	"I Blame You"	Patience EP	Also producer
2012	Plug In Stereo	"Frozen Heart"	Patience EP	Producer only
2012	Plug In Stereo	"Patience"	Patience EP	Also producer
2013	Backstreet Boys	"One Phone Call"	In a World Like This	
2013	Jason Derulo ft. The Game	"Side FX"	Tattoos	
2013	Kat Graham	"Power"	—N/a	
2013	Demi Lovato	"Heart Attack"	DEMI	
2013	Plug In Stereo ft. Megan and Liz	"To Be Wanted"	A Little Peace EP	Also producer
2013	Plug In Stereo	"Wait for Me"	—N/a	Also producer
2013	Plug In Stereo	"Home Soon"	—N/a	Also producer
2014	Brandyn Burnette	"Empire"	—N/a	
2014	Brandyn Burnette	"If You Were A Song"	—N/a	
2014	Jason Derulo ft. 2 Chainz	"Talk Dirty"	Talk Dirty	Also vocal producer
2014	Jason Derulo ft. Snoop Dogg	"Wiggle"	Talk Dirty	
2014	David Guetta	"What I Did for Love"	Listen	
2014	David Guetta	"Hey Mama"	Listen	
2014	David Guetta	"Goodbye Friend"	Listen	
2014	David Guetta	"Yesterday"	Listen	
2014	Olly Murs	"Did You Miss Me"	Never Been Better	
2014	Fifth Harmony	"Sledgehammer"	Reflection	
2014	Jessie J	"Said too Much"	Sweet Talker	
2014	Nick Jonas	"Wilderness"	Nick Jonas	Also vocal producer
2014	Nick Jonas	"Nothing Would Be Better"	Nick Jonas	Also vocal producer
2014	Danny Mercer	"Who Are You Loving Now?"	—N/a	
2014	Plug In Stereo	"Everything I Shouldn't Say"	—N/a	Producer only
2014	Plug In Stereo	"Don't Say Goodnight"	—N/a	Producer only
2015	5 Seconds of Summer	"Castaway"	Sounds Good Feels Good	
2015	Alyxx Dione ft. Jason Derulo	"Chingaling"	—N/a	
2015	Chris Brown	"Zero"	Royalty	
2015	Jason Derulo	"X2CU"	Everything Is 4	
2015	Jason Derulo	"Get Ugly"	Everything Is 4	
2015	Hilary Duff	"Brave Heart"	Breathe In. Breathe Out.	
2015	Nick Jonas	"Levels"	Nick Jonas X2	
2015	Madonna	"Ghosttown"	Rebel Heart	
2015	Madonna	"Inside Out"	Rebel Heart	
2015	Austin Mahone	"Dirty Work"	Dirty Work – The Album	
2015	Thomas Rhett	"Die a Happy Man"	Tangled Up	
2015	Thomas Rhett	"Vacation"	Tangled Up	
2015	Thomas Rhett	"I Feel Good"	Tangled Up	
2015	Max Schneider	"Gibberish"	Hell's Kitchen Angel	
2015	Daniel Skye	"LoveSick Day"	—N/a	
2016	Nick Jonas	"Champagne Problems"	Last Year Was Complicated	
2016	Nick Jonas	"Good Girls"	Last Year Was Complicated	
2016	Nick Jonas	"Chainsaw"	Last Year Was Complicated	
2016	Jon Bellion	"Morning In America"	The Human Condition	
2016	Red One feat. Enrique Iglesias, R. City, Serayah + Shaggy	"Don't You Need Somebody"	—N/a	
2016	Gavin DeGraw	"Technicolor"	Something Worth Saving	
2016	Tyler Glenn	"Waiting Around"	Excommunication	
2017	Taeyeon	"Eraser"	My Voice	Producer only
2017	The Chainsmokers	"Honest"	Memories...Do Not Open	
2017	Jeremih, Ty Dolla Sign and Sage the Gemini	"Don't Get Much Better"	The Fate of the Furious: The Album	
2017	Pitbull	"Options"	Climate Change	
2017	Dua Lipa	"Garden"	Dua Lipa	
2017	Demi Lovato	"Sorry Not Sorry"	Tell Me You Love Me	
2017	Demi Lovato	"Daddy Issues"	Tell Me You Love Me	
2017	Demi Lovato	"Only Forever"	Tell Me You Love Me	
2017	Demi Lovato	"Games"	Tell Me You Love Me	
2017	Fitz and the Tantrums	"Fool"	Fitz and the Tantrums (2017 reissue)	
2017	Thomas Rhett	"Sixteen"	Life Changes	
2017	Thomas Rhett	"Sweethart"	Life Changes	
2017	Thomas Rhett	"Gateway Love"	Life Changes	
2017	Rachel Platten	"Shivers"	Waves	
2017	Rachel Platten	"Loose Ends"	Waves	
2017	Rachel Platten	"Grace"	Waves	
2017	Chromeo	"Juice"	Head Over Heals	
2017	Chromeo	"Slummin It"	Head Over Heals	
2017	Chromeo	"Don't Sleep"	Head Over Heals	
2017	Chromeo	"Count Me Out"	Head Over Heals	
2017	Andy Grammer	"Spaceship"	The Good Parts	
2018	Bishop Briggs	"Water"	Church Of Scars	
2018	Liam Payne	"Familiar"	LP1	
2018	Ruel	"Dazed & Confused"	Ready	
2018	Matt Nathanson	"Used To Be"	Sing His Sad Heart	
2018	Matt Nathanson	"Way Way Back"	Sing His Sad Heart	
2018	Bishop Briggs	"Baby"	—N/a	
2019	Kesha ft Big Freedia	"Raising Hell"	High Road	
2019	The Chainsmokers and 5 Seconds of Summer	"Who Do You Love"	World War Joy	
2019	Léon	"Better In the Dark, Lost Time"	Léon	
2019	Lizzo	"Like A Girl"	Cuz I Love You	
2019	Lizzo	"Soulmate"	Cuz I Love You	
2019	Thomas Rhett	"Blessed"	Center Point Road	
2019	Thomas Rhett	"Notice"	Center Point Road	
2019	Lewis Capaldi	"Forever"	Divinely Uninspired to a Hellish Extent	
2019	Pretty Much	"Lying"	—N/a	
2019	Aaron Carpenter	"Chase"	—N/a	
2019	Louis Tomlinson	"Kill My Mind"	Walls	
2020	Dan + Shay	"I Should Probably Go to Bed"	Good Things	
2020	Demi Lovato	"I Love Me"	Dancing with the Devil... the Art of Starting Over	
2020	Mandy Moore	"I'd Rather Lose You"	Silver Landings	
2020	Mandy Moore	"Save a Little for Yourself"	Silver Landings	
2020	Mandy Moore	"Tryin' My Best, Los Angeles"	Silver Landings	
2020	Mandy Moore	"Stories Reminding Myself of Me"	Silver Landings	
2020	Selena Gomez	"Ring"	Rare	
2020	Selena Gomez	"Souvenir"	Rare	
2020	Louis Tomlinson	"Defenceless"	Walls	
2020	Sia	"Original"	Dolittle	
2020	Celeste	"I Can See The Change"	—N/a	
2020	Kygo & Joe Janiak	"Follow"	Golden Hour	
2020	Anthony Ramos	"Stop"	Stop	
2020	Carly Rae Jepsen	"This is What They Say"	Dedicated Side B	
2020	Lady A featuring Thomas Rhett	"Heroes"	Ocean	
2021	Celeste	"Tonight Tonight"	Not Your Muse	
2021	Celeste	"Tell Me Something I Don’t Know"	Not Your Muse	
2021	Aloe Blacc	"Corner"	All Love Everything (Deluxe)	
2021	Ashe	"Love Is Not Enough"	Ashlyn	
2021	Ashe	"When I'm Older"	Ashlyn	
2021	Ashe	"Not Mad Anymore	Ashlyn	
2021	JP Saxe	"For Emilee"	Dangerous Levels of Introspection	
2021	Jonas Brothers	"Mercy"	Space Jam: A New Legacy (Original Motion Picture Soundtrack)	
2021	Anne-Marie	"Who I Am"	Therapy	
2021	Ben Platt	"dark times"	Reverie	
2021	Mimi Webb	"Little Bit Louder"	Seven Shades of Heartbreak	
2022	JP Cooper	"Call My Name"	She	
2022	COIN	"Cutie"	Cutie - Single	
2022	Anitta	"Boys Don't Cry"	Versions of Me	
2022	Walk off the Earth, D Smoke	"Bet of Me"	Bet On Me - Single	
2022	MAX	"Gucci Bag"	Gucci Bag - Single	
2022	The Head and The Heart	"Same Hurt"	Every Shade of Blue	
2022	The Head and The Heart	"Enemy Lines"	Every Shade of Blue	
2022	Vicetone	"Tonight We Dance"	Tonight We Dance - Single	
2022	DNCE	"Flamingo"	Anything's Possible (Motion Picture Soundtrack)	
2022	Demi Lovato	"29"	Holy Fvck	Also background vocalist
2022	Demi Lovato	"Wasted"	Holy Fvck	Also background vocalist
2022	Demi Lovato	"Come Together"	Holy Fvck	Also background vocalist
2022	Mike Posner	"I'm Not Dead Yet"	I'm Not Dead Yet - Single	
2022	Meghan Trainor	"Shook"	Takin' It Back	
2022	Meghan Trainor	"Mama Wanna Mambo" (ft. Natti Natasha and Arturo Sandoval)	Takin' It Back	
2022	Meghan Trainor	"Drama Queen"	Takin' It Back	
2022	Meghan Trainor	"Lucky"	Takin' It Back	
2022	Meghan Trainor	"Made You Look"	Takin' It Back	
2022	Russell Dickerson	"She's Why"	Russell Dickerson	
2022	Calum Scott	"Cross Your Mind"	Bridges	
2023	Ava Max	"Sleep Walker"	Diamonds & Dancefloors	
2023	Ava Max	"Maybe You're The Problem"	Diamonds & Dancefloors	
2023	Ava Max	"Dancing's Done"	Diamonds & Dancefloors	
2023	Steve Aoki, Galantis	"Hungry Heart" (feat. Hayley Kiyoko)	Hungry Heart - Single	
2023	Meghan Trainor	"Mother"	Takin' It Back (Deluxe)	
2023	Ruel	"MUST BE NICE"	4TH WALL	
2023	Lauren Spencer Smith	"Best Friend Breakup"	Best Friend Breakup - Single	
2023	Lauren Spencer Smith	"Fantasy (with GAYLE & Em Beihold)"	Fantasy (with GAYLE & Em Beihold) - Single	
2023	Charlotte Lawrence	"Bodybag"	Bodybag - Single	
2023	Andy Grammer	"Love Is The New Money"	Love Is The New Money - Single	
2023	For King & Country	"What Are We Waiting For?"	What Are We Waiting For (The Single)	
2023	Kelly Clarkson	"My Mistake"	Chemistry	Also Additional vocals and co-writer
2023	Kelly Clarkson	"Roses"	Chemistry	Co-writer
2024	Jason Derulo	"Spicy Margarita"	Nu King	Co-writer
