= Not Your Muse =

Studio album by Celeste
- Released: 29 January 2021
- Studio: Assault & Battery Studios 1 (London); Parr Street Studios (Liverpool)
- Genre: Jazz; soul; R&B; pop
- Length: 44:40
- Label: Both Sides; Polydor
- Producer: Jamie Hartman; John Hill; Josh Crocker

Celeste chronology
Lately (2019)	Not Your Muse (2021)	Woman of Faces (2025)

Singles from Not Your Muse
- 1. "Strange (Edit)" Released: 4 September 2019; 2. "Stop This Flame" Released: 9 January 2020; 3. "A Little Love" Released: 13 November 2020; 4. "Love Is Back" Released: 31 December 2020

Not Your Muse is the debut studio album by British singer-songwriter Celeste, released on 29 January 2021 via Both Sides and Polydor Records. It includes the singles "Strange", "Stop This Flame", "A Little Love" and "Love Is Back". Not Your Muse was primarily written by Celeste alongside Jamie Hartman. With it, Celeste became the first British female artist in five years to have a number one debut album on the UK Albums Chart.

== Background and recording ==
Most of the songs on Not Your Muse were written by Celeste and Jamie Hartman, the latter of whom also primarily produced the record. Celeste revealed to DIY that the tracks on Not Your Muse were written and recorded without the intention of commercial success but rather with creating "what [she] wanted it to be." Alongside the announcement of the album on social media, Celeste wrote:

Not Your Muse is the power I found when I felt powerless... In making this album I have allowed myself to arrive at a place where I feel empowered, fiercely wide-eyed and fulfilled. I'm very proud of what I've achieved on my debut album and to be in this position, after the year that has been, I feel nothing but gratitude and excitement. I hope you enjoy it.

In January 2020, Celeste told NME that she would like the album to be one that people will "enjoy and listen to for a while– until at least 2022." She also told Vogue with the release of the album, she "want[s] to be one of the superstar singers of [her] time."

== Release and promotion ==
Celeste rose to prominence in 2019 with the single "Strange”, released on 4 September. She performed the song on a number of television shows and award shows, and earned critical acclaim. Shortly after winning the BBC's Sound of… critics’ poll in 2020, Celeste released the single "Stop This Flame". It became her first to garner commercial success, reaching number 47 on the UK Singles Chart in addition to the top 20 of countries such as Scotland, Belgium, the Netherlands, Denmark and Czech Republic.

The third single on Not Your Muse, "A Little Love", was originally released as the soundtrack to the annual John Lewis & Partners Christmas advert, becoming the first original non-cover to do so. It reached number 59 on the UK Singles Chart and number 4 on the UK Singles Downloads Chart.

Celeste announced her debut album and revealed its title, artwork and tracklist in early December 2020. The release date was initially 26 February 2021, but the record was released early, on 29 January. She had prior hinted at its release in late 2020, but repeatedly delayed it due to the COVID-19 pandemic as well as a few issues with the record. The song "I'm Here", which features on the album's deluxe edition, was released as a promotional single after it featured on the fourth episode of the seventeenth season of American medical drama series Grey's Anatomy. "Love Is Back" was released as the fourth single from the album on 31 December 2020, shortly before Celeste performed it for the first time on Jools' Annual Hootenanny 2020/21.

== Composition ==
Not Your Muse was described as "a modern R&B classical take" with "elements of noir that constantly poke through which gives the record a timeless quality." Dork wrote that the record utilises "an almost perfect split of stripped-down, sultry jazz tracks and pop-leaning songs full of soul-inspired energy, all unified by the singer’s staggeringly smooth vocals."

== Critical reception ==
Professional ratings
Aggregate scores
Source	Rating
AnyDecentMusic?	7.5/10
Metacritic	81/100
Review scores
Source	Rating
AllMusic	4/5 stars
DIY	4/5 stars
Evening Standard	3/5 stars
The Guardian	3/5 stars
The Independent	4/5 stars
The Line of Best Fit	8/10
musicOMH	4/5 stars
NME	4/5 stars
The Telegraph	4/5 stars
The Times	3/5 stars

Not Your Muse received critical acclaim, with some critics praising Celeste's vocals while also criticizing the music. At Metacritic, which assigns a normalized rating out of 100 to reviews from mainstream critics, the album has an average score of 81 based on 10 reviews, indicating "universal acclaim". Writing for The Telegraph, music critic Neil McCormick described the record as "a classy debut" and noted that "the sultry timbre, smoky tones and jazzy flow of Celeste have a timeless quality". He also praised the "striking" balance between vocals and instrumentation and noted that it "maintain[s] an aura of restraint where Celeste’s vocal quirks can shine." Not Your Muse was nominated for the 2021 Mercury Music Prize.

== Commercial performance ==
Not Your Muse debuted at number one on the UK Albums Chart for the week beginning 5 February 2021, becoming the first debut album by a British female artist to top the chart in over five years, the last being Jess Glynne's I Cry When I Laugh in August 2015. It had made 16,957 sales by midweek, and 22,475 sales by the end of the week; 18,206 of which were physical copies.

== Track listing ==
Not Your Muse – International standard edition
No.	Title	Writer(s)	Producer(s)	Length
1.	"Ideal Woman"	Celeste Epiphany Waite; Joshua Crocker	Charlie Hugall; Crocker	3:43
2.	"Strange" (Edit)	Waite; Stephen Wrabel; Jamie Hartman	J. Hartman	3:20
3.	"Tonight Tonight"	Waite; Sean Douglas; J. Hartman	Hugall; Kid Harpoon; Crocker	3:39
4.	"Stop This Flame"	Waite; J. Hartman	J. Hartman; John Hill	3:18
5.	"Tell Me Something I Don’t Know"	Waite; J. Hartman; Jamien Nagadhana	Hugall	3:56
6.	"Not Your Muse"	Waite; Simon Aldred	Hugall	4:27
7.	"Beloved"	Waite; J. Hartman	Josh Crocker	3:57
8.	"Love Is Back"	Waite; J. Hartman; Ettie Hartman	Crocker; Hugall	4:16
9.	"A Kiss"	Waite; J. Hartman; Mattias Larsson; Robin Fredriksson; Mark Mollison	Crocker; Hugall	3:58
10.	"The Promise"	Waite; Holly Millman; Mollison	Crocker; Hugall	3:45
11.	"A Little Love"	Waite; J. Hartman	J. Hartman; Crocker	2:58
12.	"Some Goodbyes Come with Hellos"	Waite; J. Hartman; Gregory Hein; Samuel Romans	J. Hartman	3:25
Total length:				44:40

Not Your Muse – International deluxe edition bonus tracks and Japanese standard edition
No.	Title	Writer(s)	Producer(s)	Length
13.	"Father's Son"	Waite; Thomas Havelock	Havelock	3:15
14.	"Lately" (with Gotts Street Park)	Waite; Gotts Street Park	Crocker	4:11
15.	"Both Sides of the Moon" (with Gotts Street Park)	Waite; Gotts Street Park	Crocker	4:13
16.	"Strange"	Waite; Wrabel; J. Hartman	Hartman	4:15
17.	"Unseen" (with Lauren Auder)	Waite; Eli Teplin; Christopher Stracey; Tobias Jesso Jr.; Sylvian Gerboud	Stracey; Dviance; Teplin	3:49
18.	"In the Summer of My Life"	Waite; Terrace Martin	Martin	4:07
19.	"It's All Right" (Jon Batiste featuring Celeste)	Curtis Mayfield	Tom MacDougall	2:49
20.	"Hear My Voice"	Waite; Daniel Pemberton	Pemberton	3:02
21.	"I'm Here"	Waite; Justin Parker	Parker	3:25
Total length:				77:46

Not Your Muse – Japanese standard edition (bonus track)
No.	Title	Writer(s)	Producer(s)	Length
22.	"La vie en rose"	Édith Piaf; Louiguy; Marguerite Monnot	Crocker	2:12
Total length:				79:58

Not Your Muse – Alternative track listing vinyl edition Side one
No.	Title	Length
1.	"Ideal Woman"	3:42
2.	"Tell Me Something I Don't Know"	3:56
3.	"Not Your Muse"	4:27
4.	"Beloved"	3:57

Side two
No.	Title	Length
1.	"The Promise"	3:45
2.	"Love Is Back"	4:16
3.	"A Kiss"	3:58
4.	"Some Goodbyes Come with Hellos"	3:25

Notes

- ^{^[a]} signifies a co-writer

== Credits and personnel ==
Adapted from TIDAL and the album's liner notes.

=== Musicians ===
- Celeste Epiphany Waite – vocals (all tracks), songwriting (all tracks)
- Charlie Hugall – production (1, 3, 5, 6, 8, 9, 10), percussion (5, 6, 8), double bass (6), drum programming (6, 8), horn arranger (6), marimba (6), mellotron (6), trombone (6), tuba (6), viola (6), violin (6), woodwinds (6), acoustic guitar (10), horn (10), wurlitzer electric piano (10)
- Josh Crocker – production (1, 3, 7, 8, 9, 10, 11), songwriting (1), drums (1), guitar (1, 3, 7, 8), piano (1, 9), strings (3, 7, 11), bass (7, 9), percussion (7, 9, 11), string arranger (7, 9), vibraphone (7, 11), drum programming (8), harp (8), whistle (9), glockenspiel (11), keyboards (11)
- Jamien Nagadhana – songwriting (1, 5), bass (1, 3, 5, 6, 8, 10)
- Jamie Hartman – production (2, 4, 11, 12), songwriting (2, 4, 5, 7, 8, 9), piano (2, 4), bass programming (4), guitar (4, 12), mellotron (4), organ (4), percussion (4), strings (4), synthesizer (4), electric guitar (9)
- Joe Harris – guitar (1)
- Stephen Wrabel – songwriting (2)
- Eric Leva – songwriting (2)
- Sebastian Plano – string arrangement (16), strings (4, 6, 9, 11, 16), strings conductor (4, 6, 9, 11, 16)
- Kid Harpoon – production (3), guitar (3)
- John Hill – production (4), bass (4), drums (4), guitar (4)
- Sean Douglas – songwriting (3)
- Jermaine Amissah – baritone saxophone (3, 5, 6, 8)
- Jamie Houghton – drums (3, 5, 6, 8), percussion (5)
- Dominic Canning – piano (3, 5, 6, 8, 10), mellotron (5), synthesizer programming (6), rhodes (10)
- Rob Moose – strings (3)
- Kaidi Akinnibi – tenor saxophone (3, 5, 8, 10), horn arranger (5, 8)
- Elias Atkinson – trumpet (3, 5,8)
- Misha Fox – trombone (3, 5, 8)
- Rafa Padilla – percussion (4)
- Samson Jatto – percussion (4)
- Davide Rossi – strings (4)
- Stuart Crichton – synthesizer programming (4)
- Mark Mollison – electric guitar (5, 6, 8, 9, 10), songwriting (9, 10)
- Simon Aldred – songwriting (6), acoustic guitar (6)
- Ettie Hartman – songwriting (8)
- Tom Henry – glockenspiel (8), synthesizer (8)
- Mattias Larsson and Robin Fredriksson – songwriting (9)
- Holly Millman – songwriting (10)
- Parthenope Wald-Harding – flute (10)

=== Technical ===
- Charlie Hugall – engineering (1, 8, 10), mixing (9)
- Josh Croker – engineering (1, 7, 8, 9, 10)
- Richie Kennedy – engineering (1, 3, 5, 6, 8, 9, 10)
- Tchad Blake – mixing (1, 6, 7, 8, 10)
- Ed Farrell – assistant recording engineering (3, 5, 6, 9, 10)
- Tom Elmhirst – mixing (2)
- John Davis – mastering (1, 3, 4, 5, 6, 7, 8, 9, 10, 11, 12)
- Mark "Spike" Stent – mixing (3, 5, 11)
- Blake Mares – engineering (4)
- Rob Cohen – engineering (4)
- Jamie Hartman – recording engineering (4)
- Manny Marroquin – mixing (4)
- Chris Galland – mix engineering (4)
- Nathan Boddy – mixing (11)

=== Design ===
- Matt de Jong – design
- Sophie McElligott – illustration
- Elizaveta Porodina – photography

== Charts ==
=== Weekly charts ===
Weekly chart performance for Not Your Muse
Chart (2021)	Peak position
Austrian Albums (Ö3 Austria)	4
Belgian Albums (Ultratop Flanders)	1
Belgian Albums (Ultratop Wallonia)	48
French Albums (SNEP)	95
Dutch Albums (Album Top 100)	6
German Albums (Offizielle Top 100)	6
Greek Albums (IFPI Greece)	58
Irish Albums (OCC)	24
Scottish Albums (OCC)	1
Swiss Albums (Schweizer Hitparade)	6
UK Albums (OCC)	1

=== Year-end charts ===
Year-end chart performance for Not Your Muse
Chart (2021)	Position
Belgian Albums (Ultratop Flanders)	122
German Albums (Offizielle Top 100)	98
UK Albums (OCC)	89

== Certifications ==
Region	Certification	Certified units/sales
United Kingdom (BPI)	Gold	100,000^{‡}
^{‡} Sales+streaming figures based on certification alone.
