= Little Runaway (Celeste song) =

2020 single by Celeste

Single by Celeste
- Released: 25 August 2020
- Genre: Jazz
- Length: 2:59
- Label: Both Sides; Polydor
- Songwriters: Celeste Epiphany Waite; Gary Go; Jamie Hartman
- Producers: TMS; TommyD

Celeste singles chronology
"I Can See the Change" (2020)	"Little Runaway" (2020)	"Hear My Voice" (2020)

"Little Runaway" is a song by British singer Celeste, released on 25 August 2020 through Both Sides and Polydor Records. The song was written by the singer herself with Gary Go and Jamie Hartman, and also features production from TMS and TommyD.

== Background ==
Talking about the song, Celeste said, "'Little Runaway' is a song about losing your faith, even if just momentarily, and seeking answers from spirits and ghosts as nothing seems to make sense on this planet. My favourite line in the song is 'good news I could use some' – I believe everyone has a guardian angel, a protector, and this is me talking to mine. The verses actually started as this saxophone sample we were playing around with and eventually it transformed into the melody. I always play the sax back in my head even though it's not in the song."

== Music video ==
A music video to accompany the release of "Little Runaway" was first released onto YouTube on 25 August 2020. The video was directed by Sophie Jones and shows the singer's image being presented through a series of kaleidoscopic gazes.

== Track listing ==
Digital download
No.	Title	Length
1.	"Little Runaway"	2:59

== Credits and personnel ==
Credits adapted from Tidal.

- TMS – producer
- Tommy Danvers – producer, additional producer, associated performer, keyboards
- Celeste Epiphany Waite – composer, lyricist, associated performer, vocals
- Gary Go – composer, lyricist
- Jamie Hartman – composer, lyricist, associated performer, programming, vocal producer
- Ben Kohn – associated performer, programming
- Kerenza Peacock – associated performer, viola, violin
- Neil Cowley – associated performer, piano
- Peter Kelleher – associated performer, synthesizer
- Rosie Danvers – associated performer, cello, string arranger
- Tom Barnes – associated performer, drums
- Vern Asbury – associated performer, guitar
- Zara Benyounes – associated performer, viola, violin
- John Davis – mastering engineer, studio personnel
- Spike Stent – mixer, studio personnel
- Lewis Wright – recording engineer, studio personnel

== Charts ==
Chart (2020)	Peak position
Belgium (Ultratop 50 Flanders)	42
Belgium (Ultratip Bubbling Under Wallonia)	38
Netherlands (Single Tip)	9
Netherlands (Mega Top 30)	26
