= I Can See the Change =

2020 single by Celeste

Single by Celeste
- Released: 27 May 2020
- Studio: Finneas' home studio in Highland Park, Los Angeles
- Length: 3:38
- Label: Polydor
- Songwriter(s): Celeste Waite; David Palmer; Jamie Hartman; Sean Douglas
- Producer(s): Finneas O'Connell

Celeste singles chronology
"Stop This Flame" (2020)	"I Can See the Change" (2020)	"Little Runaway" (2020)

"I Can See the Change" is a song by British singer Celeste, released on 27 May 2020. The ballad was produced by American musician Finneas O'Connell, after meeting Celeste at the 2020 Brit Awards.

== Background and composition ==
"I Can See the Change" is the followup to Celeste's January 2020 single "Stop This Flame" which achieved European mainstream radio airplay success in early 2020. Celeste revealed the song (originally titled "The Change") to the Italian magazine Di Repubblica in April 2020.

Following Celeste's performance of the song "Strange" at the 2020 Brit Awards, producer Finneas O'Connell tweeted the song's album art and wrote, "Heard this song for the first time when performing at the brits and fell in love with it immediately," further telling The Line of Best Fit that he was "blown away" and that he "immediately went home and downloaded her entire catalogue." Celeste told Vogue about her encounter with O'Connell and his sister Billie Eilish at the ceremony: "Finneas and I had a brief encounter and just said hello, but later I sent him the demo to see if he wanted to work on it. He was up for it so we just started talking over text for hours over the course of a few days until we finished. He’d iMessage me with different sounds asking, 'Do you like this?' and I’d go 'Yeah!' until we had the finished song."

Celeste told DIY that the idea of the song came to her when she was feeling "disconnected from [her]self" and that she knew that "something needed to change". She expressed to The List that the song is ultimately about "hope and change but knowing that to obtain this requires effort, patience and conviction."

As the song was released amid the 2020 Black Lives Matter protests, Celeste wrote that it took on a "new and more powerful meaning" because of the impact of the COVID-19 pandemic and the "global reinvigoration" of the movement."

== Music video ==
The music video was filmed in Celeste's living room and was directed over Zoom call. Vogue wrote that it "channel[s] the old-school glamour of classic film noir".

The music video for "I Can See the Change" was filmed during the COVID-19 lockdown in Celeste's living room. The black-and-white visual directed by Sophie Jones via Zoom call, and was described by Vogue as Celeste's "most evocative visual to date". Keaton Bell wrote, "Channeling the old-school glamour of classic film noir, Celeste sings of her desire for change in many forms alongside footage from a 1963 Martin Luther King Jr. rally,".

== Critical reception ==
Tom Skinner of NME described "I Can See the Change" as a "stirring ballad" which includes "subtle orchestral elements" which accompany Celeste's "powerful" vocals as the track progresses. Mike Wass of Idolator dubbed the song as a "stripped-back, optimistic ballad," with The Times also describing it as a "gorgeously smokey ballad". Jon Pareles of The New York Times wrote that the song "negotiates the digital and human, striving to stay embodied", and described Celeste as "a singer defying Auto-Tune to waver and swoop like Amy Winehouse and, perhaps, Billie Holiday." Sarah Jamieson of DIY wrote described the song as "a bittersweet but redemptive track which glimmers with hope." Billy Niles of E! wrote that the "stunning" single is "a stirringly optimistic piece about hope and change that soars thanks, in large part, to her smoky vocal."

== Credits and personnel ==
Credits adapted from Tidal:

- Celeste – vocals, songwriter
- Finneas O'Connell – producer, background vocals, engineer (recording; mastering), bass vocals, synthesizer, piano, string arrangement, studio personnel
- Nathan Boddy – mixer, studio personnel
- John Davis – mastering engineer, studio personnel
- David Palmer – songwriter
- Jamie Hartman – songwriter
- Sean Douglas – songwriter
- Sebastian Plano – strings

== Charts ==
Chart (2020)	Peak position
Belgium (Ultratop 50 Flanders)	43
Belgium Urban (Ultratop Flanders)	8
Netherlands (Dutch Tipprade)	12
Netherlands (Mega Top 30)	7
