= Jamie Hartman =

English songwriter and producer (born 1971)

- Born: 1971 (age 54–55); London, England
- Genres: Pop, indie pop, R&B
- Occupations: Songwriter, producer, singer
- Years active: 2006–present
- Labels: EMI; Island; Reservoir Media

Jamie Hartman (born 1971) is an English songwriter and producer based in Los Angeles, CA, and the former lead singer of the indie-pop band Ben's Brother.

== Early life ==
Hartman was born and raised in London.

== Career ==
=== Ben's Brother ===
Hartman formed and was the lead singer of the band Ben's Brother, so named because he has an older brother named Ben. Their debut album Beta Male Fairytales, released on EMI Records in 2007, went gold in the UK and reached number 14 on the UK Albums Chart. The single "Let Me Out" earned Hartman a nomination for the Ivor Novello Award for Best Song.

In 2009, the band released their second album, Battling Giants, which reached number 56 on the UK Albums Chart. That album's first single, "Apologise", was co-written with Natalie Imbruglia, and released by Island Records. The album also includes appearances by Jason Mraz and Joss Stone.

=== Songwriting ===
Hartman co-wrote the 2016 single "Human" by Rag'n'Bone Man, which reached number 1 on 20 charts in 16 countries. He wrote "All You Good Friends", the debut single for The Voice UK 2016 winner Kevin Simm; co-wrote "All I Need to Know" by Emma Bunton; wrote and produced "Stargazing" by Kygo; co-wrote "Giant" by Calvin Harris and Rag'n'Bone Man; which was nominated for a Brit Award in 2020 for Best Song. Jamie was also a producer on Conrad Sewell's debut EP All I Know, co-writing the single "Start Again", which won the 2015 ARIA Award for Song of the Year.

Hartman co-wrote and co-produced the Backstreet Boys single "Don't Go Breaking My Heart" with Stuart Crichton and Stephen Wrabel. They won a BMI Award for writing the song, which was nominated for the 2019 Grammy Award for Best Pop Duo/Group Performance. He wrote two songs, including the single "Hold Me While You Wait", on Lewis Capaldi's 2019 album Divinely Uninspired to a Hellish Extent, which was the top album on the UK Albums Chart for the years 2019 and 2020. In 2020, Jamie co-wrote the end title of Disney's Mulan entitled Loyal Brave True which was nominated for a World Soundtrack Award and was also nominated at Chicago's Indie Critics Awards (CIC) He wrote and produced nine songs on Celeste's 2021 album Not Your Muse, which reached number 1 on the UK Albums Chart. He was nominated for a Grammy in 2022 for Best Song Written For Visual Media with "Here I Am (Singing My Way Home)" from Respect (soundtrack) co-written by Hartman, Jennifer Hudson & Carole King. "Here I Am (Singing My Way Home) was also nominated at the 2022 Grammys, Society of Composers and Lyricists Awards, Black Reel Awards, Satellite Awards, and Hollywood Music in Media Awards (HMMA). In 2023, Hartman had a hit with Lewis Capaldi's "Heavenly Kind of State of Mind" from his Broken by Desire to Be Heavenly Sent album, which became the fastest selling album of 2023. He also co-wrote hit song "Dancing is Healing" with Rudimental, Charlotte Plank and Vibe Chemistry and co-wrote 2023 breakout hit with Sam Ryder featuring Brian May that broke in a montage scene in Ted Lasso season 3, episode 11 which was nominated for an Emmy in 2023 for Outstanding Original Music and Lyrics, and also won at the Hollywood Music in Media Awards for Best Song For a TV show/Limited Series. Jamie also co-wrote Rudimental, Charlotte Plank and Vibe Chemistry - Dancing Is Healing which was nominated for Song of the year at the 2024 Brit Awards.

He has also written for Christina Aguilera, Jennifer Hudson, Andy Grammer, James Bay, Kylie Minogue, Anastacia, The Wanted, JP Cooper, Miriam Bryant, Will Young and Louis Tomlinson.

== Awards and nominations ==
Year	Award ceremony	Category	Nominee(s)/work(s)	Result	Ref.
2005	BMI Pop Award	Songs	"I'm Ready" by Cherie	Won	
2007	Brit Awards	British Single of the Year	"All Time Love" by Will Young	Nominated	
2008	Ivor Novello Awards	Best Song	"Let Me Out" by Ben's Brother	Nominated	
2015	ARIA Awards	Song of the Year	"Start Again" by Conrad Sewell	Won	
2017	P3 Gold Awards	Song of the Year	"Black Car" by Miriam Bryant	Won	
2017	Swedish Grammys	Song of the Year	"Black Car" by Miriam Bryant	Nominated	
2017	Music Business Worldwide The A&R Awards	Songwriter of the Year	Himself	Nominated	
2018	Brit Awards	British Single of the Year	"Human" by Rag'n'Bone Man	Won	
2018	BMI Pop Award	Songs	"Human" by Rag'n'Bone Man	Won	
2018	Ivor Novello Awards	Most Performed Work	"Human" by Rag'n'Bone Man	Nominated	
2019	BMI Pop Award	Songs	"Don't Go Breaking My Heart" by Backstreet Boys	Won	
2019	Music Business Worldwide The A&R Awards	Songwriter of the Year	Himself	Nominated	
2020	Ivor Novello Awards	Most Performed Work	"Giant" by Calvin Harris and Rag'n'Bone Man	Won	
2020	Ivor Novello Awards	Most Performed Work	"Hold Me While You Wait" by Lewis Capaldi	Nominated	
2021	Music Week Awards	Sync of the Year	"A Little Love" by Celeste	Won	
2021	Music Business Worldwide The A&R Awards	Songwriter of the Year	Himself	Nominated	
2021	Music Business Worldwide The A&R Awards	Song of the Year	"A Little Love" by Celeste	Nominated	
2021	Ivor Novello Awards	Best Song Musically & Lyrically	"Stop This Flame" by Celeste	Nominated	
2021	Ivor Novello Awards	Songwriter of the Year	Himself	Won	
2022	Grammy Awards	Best Song Written for Visual Media	"Here I Am (Singing My Way Home)" (with Jennifer Hudson and Carole Klein) (from Respect)	Nominated	
2022	Golden Globe Awards	Best Original Song - Motion Picture	"Here I Am (Singing My Way Home)" (with Jennifer Hudson and Carole Klein) (from Respect)	Nominated	
2023	Primetime Emmy Awards	Outstanding Original Music and Lyrics	"Fought & Lost" (with Sam Ryder and Tom Howe) (from Ted Lasso)	Nominated	

== Discography ==
=== With Ben's Brother ===
Title	Release details	Peak chart positions		
Title	Release details	UK	FRA	ITA
Beta Male Fairytales	Release date: July 2, 2007; Label: EMI Records; Formats: CD, digital download	14	46	61
Battling Giants	Release date: May 11, 2009; Label: Flat Cap Records/Island Records; Formats: CD, digital download	56	—	—
Glow (EP)	Release date: April 25, 2010; Label: Flat Cap Records; Formats: Digital download	—	—	—

=== Songwriting and production credits ===
Title	Year	Artist(s)	Album	Credits
"I'm Ready"	2004	Cherie	Cherie	Co-writer
"All Time Love"	2005	Will Young	Keep On	Co-writer
"Mon Ange"	2005	Nolwenn Leroy	Histoires Naturelles	Co-writer
"Golden"	2010	The Wanted	The Wanted	Co-writer, producer
"Love is War"	2010	Joe McElderry	Wide Awake	Co-writer
"Feel"	2011	Dotan	Dream Parade	Co-writer
"Time"	2012	Lena	Stardust	Co-writer
"Army of Me"	2012	Christina Aguilera	Lotus	Co-writer, producer
"Move Together"	2013	James Bay	Chaos and the Calm	Co-writer
"Lifeline"	2014	Anastacia	Resurrection	Co-writer, producer
"Pendulum"	2014	Anastacia	Resurrection	Co-writer, producer
"Stay"	2014	Anastacia	Resurrection	Co-writer, producer
"Apology"	2014	Anastacia	Resurrection	Co-writer, producer
"Other Side of Crazy"	2014	Anastacia	Resurrection	Co-writer, producer
"Forever"	2014	Andy Grammer	Magazines or Novels	Co-writer
"When the Beat Drops Out"	2014	Marlon Roudette	Electric Soul	Co-writer
"Your Only Love"	2014	Marlon Roudette	Electric Soul	Co-writer
"Flicker"	2014	Marlon Roudette	Electric Soul	Co-writer
"Dark Stars"	2015	Marina Kaye	Fearless	Co-writer, producer
"Your Body" (featuring Giorgio Moroder)	2015	Kylie Minogue	Kylie + Garibay	Co-writer
"Start Again"	2015	Conrad Sewell	All I Know	Co-writer, producer
"Who You Lovin'"	2015	Conrad Sewell	All I Know	Co-writer, producer
"Remind Me"	2015	Conrad Sewell	All I Know	Co-writer, producer
"Satellite"	2015	Ison & Fille	Resume	Co-writer
"I'm Giving In"	2016	Matt Andersen	Honest Man	Co-writer
"Tunnel Vision"	2016	Mads Langer	Reckless Twin	Co-writer
"3AM"	2016	Mads Langer	Reckless Twin	Co-writer
"Shadow"	2016	Birdy	Beautiful Lies	Co-writer
"Healed"	2016	Rag'n'Bone Man	Human	Co-writer
"Human"	2016	Rag'n'Bone Man	Human	Co-writer
"Black Car"	2016	Miriam Bryant	Bye Bye Blue	Co-writer
"Lion"	2016	Kacy Hill	Like a Woman	Co-writer
"Can't Steal the Music"	2017	Aura Dione	Can't Steal the Music	Co-writer
"Remember Me"	2017	Jennifer Hudson		Co-writer, producer
"Passport Home"	2017	JP Cooper	Raised Under Grey Skies	Co-writer, producer
"Svart Bil"	2017	Miriam Bryant	Bye Bye Blue	Co-writer
"I Believe in Us"	2017	LEON	Surround Me	Co-writer, producer
"Stargazing" (featuring Justin Jesso)	2017	Kygo	Stargazing	Co-writer, producer
"Power to the Peaceful"	2017	Paloma Faith	The Architect	Co-writer, producer
"Burden Down"	2017	Jennifer Hudson		Co-writer, producer
"Smoke"	2018	Sam Fischer	Not a Hobby	Co-writer, producer
"I Don't Want to Know"	2018	Sigrid	Raw	Co-writer, producer
"Don't Go Breaking My Heart"	2018	Backstreet Boys	DNA	Co-writer, producer
"Giant"	2019	Calvin Harris and Rag'n'Bone Man		Co-writer, producer
"Kill My Mind"	2019	Louis Tomlinson	Walls	Co-writer, producer
"Hold Me While You Wait"	2019	Lewis Capaldi	Divinely Uninspired to a Hellish Extent	Co-writer
"Don't Get Me Wrong"	2019	Lewis Capaldi	Divinely Uninspired to a Hellish Extent	Co-writer, producer
"Strange"	2019	Celeste	Not Your Muse	Co-writer, producer
"Walls"	2020	Louis Tomlinson	Walls	Co-writer
"Fearless"	2020	Louis Tomlinson	Walls	Co-writer
"I Can See The Change"	2020	Celeste		Co-writer
"Stop This Flame"	2020	Celeste	Not Your Muse	Co-writer, producer
"A Little Love"	2020	Celeste	Not Your Muse	Co-writer, producer
"Love is Back"	2020	Celeste	Not Your Muse	Co-writer
"Tonight Tonight"	2021	Celeste	Not Your Muse	Co-writer
"Tell Me Something I Don't Know"	2021	Celeste	Not Your Muse	Co-writer
"Beloved"	2021	Celeste	Not Your Muse	Co-writer
"A Kiss"	2021	Celeste	Not Your Muse	Co-writer
"Some Goodbyes Come with Hellos"	2021	Celeste	Not Your Muse	Co-writer, Producer
"Hey Girl"	2022	Stephen Sanchez	Easy On My Eyes	Co-writer
"Heavenly Kinda State of Mind"	2023	Lewis Capaldi	Broken by Desire to be Heavenly Sent	Co-writer
