= Love Is Back (song) =

2020 single by Celeste

Single by Celeste

from the album Not Your Muse
- Released: 31 December 2020
- Genre: Retro-soul
- Length: 4:14
- Label: Both Sides; Polydor
- Songwriters: Celeste Epiphany Waite; Jamie Hartman; Ettie Hartman
- Producers: Josh Crocker; Charlie Hugall

Celeste singles chronology
"A Little Love" (2020)	"Love Is Back" (2020)

"Love Is Back" is a song by British singer Celeste. It was released through Both Sides and Polydor Records on 31 December 2020 as the fourth single from her debut studio album Not Your Muse. The song was co-written by Celeste and both Jamie Hartman and his daughter Ettie and features production from Josh Crocker and Charlie Hugall.

== Composition ==
"Love Is Back" is a retro-soul song "filled with punchy brass, jangling guitar riffs and velvety vocals that melt over the soulful production". It is also built around "horns and a heavy drum groove".

== Critical reception ==
In a write-up for The New York Times, Lindsay Zoladz wrote that Celeste "croons coolly for much of the song before a dazzling grand finale showcases the strength of her smoky voice, which recalls both Amy Winehouse and Billie Holiday." Deep Shah of ColorsxStudios noted that the song "encompasses an enriching and uplifting atmosphere with its twinkling soundscape". Billboard described it as "rousing" and praised Celeste's vocal "swoons", while NME described it as a "confident and sultry belter" which indicates that the singer is "well on her way to becoming the latest British soul hero." Writing for The Honey Pop, Emily Defoor agreed that Celeste is "on the rise of being the new queen of soul", and further described the song as a "dreamy" mixture of "hypnotic vocals and feel good beats". Alexander Zwerner of Earmilk described the song as "gorgeous" and "uplifting", and highlighted its "groove-laden production" and "enriching and uplifting ambiance” while praising Celeste's "incredibly sanguine" lyrics. In a write-up for Nothing but Hope and Passion, Liv Toerkell the song as a "retro-sounding gem" and wrote that Celeste's "soaring vocals are pure soul" while highlighting how she "unleashes her full range in a goosebump-evoking outcry" towards the end of the song.

== Live performances ==
While touring and performing at festivals in 2019 and early 2020, Celeste performed "Love Is Back" a number of times despite the song being unreleased. She first performed it in February 2019 it for the British Music Embassy at South by Southwest in Austin, Texas, and then for BBC Music Introducing Sessions at Maida Vale Studios in May 2019, as well as at 2019 Glastonbury Festival in July. Celeste also added the song to her setlist on her European tour opening for Michael Kiwanuka in 2019, and during her residence at Omeara in south east London. Celeste first officially debuted the released song on the BBC Two television special Jools' Annual Hootenanny 2020/21, which prompted mainstream public interest and a large increase in sales, ultimately helping it debut at number 52 on the UK Singles Downloads Chart. Celeste's performance of "Love Is Back" on the 449th episode of The Graham Norton Show in mid January 2021, would also prompt yet another boost in sales.

== Music video ==
The official music video for "Love Is Back" was directed by Sammy King and released on 21 January 2021. It features guest appearances from Melanie C, Miss Jason, Faye Wei Wei, Princess Julia, Jaime Winstone, Elheist, and Josephine Jones.

== Charts ==
Chart performance for "Love Is Back"
Chart (2021)	Peak position
Belgium (Ultratop 50 Flanders)	40
Netherlands (Tipparade)	16
UK Singles Downloads (Official Charts)	52
