= Sunshine (Tieks song) =

Single by Tieks featuring Dan Harkna
- Released: 9 October 2015
- Recorded: 2015
- Genre: Dance
- Length: 3:00
- Label: Ministry of Sound

Tieks singles chronology
"Sing That Song" (2014)	"Sunshine" (2015)	"Say a Prayer" (2017)

"Sunshine" is a song performed by English producer and songwriter Tieks featuring vocals from Dan Harkna. The song was released as a digital download in the United Kingdom on 9 October 2015 through Ministry of Sound. The song peaked at number 15 on the UK Singles Chart in August 2016 after the song featured on an advert for the Fiat 500.

== Music video ==
A music video to accompany the release of "Sunshine" was first released onto YouTube on 15 July 2016 at a total length of three minutes and one second. The video consisted of a variety of dachshunds running around.

== Charts ==
Chart performance for "Sunshine"
Chart (2016)	Peak position
Ireland (IRMA)	56
Scotland (OCC)	9
UK Singles (OCC)	15
UK Dance (OCC)	8

== Release history ==
Release history and formats for "Sunshine"
Region	Date	Format	Label
United Kingdom	9 October 2015	Digital download	Ministry of Sound
