= A Little Love (song) =

2020 single by Celeste

Single by Celeste

from the album Not Your Muse
- Released: 13 November 2020
- Length: 2:58
- Label: Both Sides; Polydor
- Songwriters: Jamie Hartman; Celeste Epiphany Waite
- Producers: Jamie Hartman; Josh Crocker

Celeste singles chronology
"Hear My Voice" (2020)	"A Little Love" (2020)	"Love Is Back" (2020)

"A Little Love" is a song by British singer Celeste, released through Both Sides and Polydor Records on 13 November 2020. Apart from serving as the third single from her debut studio album, Not Your Muse, it also became the first original non-cover song to serve as the soundtrack to the annual John Lewis & Partners Christmas advert.

== Background ==
On the song, Celeste said: "I felt honoured to be asked to take part. I wanted to create something that felt classic but still true to who I am as a writer and performer." It became a soundtrack to the advert titled "Give A Little Love".

== Critical reception ==
Professional ratings
Review scores
Source	Rating
Evening Standard	3/5 stars
The Independent	4/5 stars

The song was described by Roisin O'Connor of The Independent as "a gem, on which Celeste recalls the smoky sensuousness of Eartha Kitt."

== Live performances ==
Celeste performed the song on the ninth season finale of the British television music competition The Voice UK. She also performed the song at the 2020 Royal Variety Performance, and at the 2020 Top of the Pops Christmas Day Special. On 11 December 2020, Celeste performed "A Little Love" at on The One Show's tribute show to Dame Barbara Windsor.

== Charts ==
Chart (2020)	Peak position
UK Singles (OCC)	59
