= Sing That Song =

Single by Tieks featuring Celeste
- Released: 9 September 2014
- Recorded: 2014
- Genre: Dance
- Length: 2:59
- Label: Atlantic
- Songwriters: Celeste Waite; Mark Tieku; Uzoechi Emenike
- Producer: Tieks

Tieks singles chronology
| "Sing That Song" (2014) | "Sunshine" (2015) |

Celeste singles chronology
| "Sing That Song" (2014) | "Touch Me" (2015) |

"Sing That Song" is a song performed by English producer and songwriter Tieks, featuring vocals from English singer Celeste. The song was released as a digital download in the United Kingdom on 9 September 2014 through Atlantic Records. The song peaked at number 90 on the UK Singles Chart.

== Music video ==
A music video to accompany the release of "Sing That Song" was first released onto YouTube on 11 September 2014 at a total length of three minutes and eight seconds.

== Chart performance ==
Chart performance for "Sing That Song"
| Chart (2014) | Peak position |
|---|---|
| Scotland Singles (OCC) | 90 |
| UK Singles (OCC) | 90 |

== Release history ==
Release history and formats for "Sing That Song"
| Region | Date | Format | Label |
|---|---|---|---|
| United Kingdom | 9 September 2014 | Digital download | Atlantic |
