= Tieks =

British music producer

- Origin: London, England
- Genre: Dance
- Occupations: DJ; producer; songwriter
- Years active: 2014–present
- Labels: Ministry of Sound, RCA

Mark Anthony Tieku, also known as Tieks (often stylised as TIEKS) is a multi platinum selling and BAFTA winning English songwriter, record producer, mixer, and mastering engineer from London. He is best known for his work with Florence & The Machine, Ed Sheeran, The XX, Jax Jones, Jess Glynn, and many more.

== Career ==
=== 2014–present ===
On 9 September 2014, he released his debut single "Sing That Song", featuring vocals from Celeste. The song peaked at number 90 on the UK Singles Chart and Scottish Singles Chart. On 9 October 2015, he released the single "Sunshine", featuring vocals from Dan Harkna. The song peaked at number 15 on the UK Singles Chart and number 9 on the Scottish Singles Chart. It soundtracked the new Fiat 500 advert, and was streamed over 200m times.

== Discography ==
=== Singles ===
List of singles, with selected chart positions
Title	Year	Peak chart positions				Album
Title	Year	UK	UK Dance	IRE	SCO	Album
"Sing That Song" (featuring Celeste)	2014	90	—	—	90	Non-album singles
"Sunshine" (featuring Dan Harkna)	2015	15	8	56	9	Non-album singles
"Say a Prayer" (featuring Chaka Khan and Popcaan)	2017	—	—	—	98	Non-album singles
