= John Lewis Christmas advert =

British advertising campaign

- Screenshot of the 2025 advertisement
- Agency: AdamandEveDDB (2019-2022); Saatchi & Saatchi (2023-present)
- Client: John Lewis & Partners; Waitrose & Partners
- Language: English
- Media: Television
- Running time: 3:00
- Release date: 3 November 2026
- Country: United Kingdom
- Preceded by: Where Love Lives
- Official website: Official Site

The John Lewis Christmas advert is an ongoing television advertising campaign released by British department store chain John Lewis & Partners in the build-up to Christmas. John Lewis & Partners launched their first Christmas advert in 2007. It has since become something of an annual tradition in the UK, and one of the signals that the countdown to Christmas has begun. The adverts tend to attract widespread media coverage and acclaim upon their release. Between 2019 and 2020, the advert has promoted both John Lewis & Partners and Waitrose & Partners.

The songs used in the advertising campaigns are frequently covers (excluding 2018, 2020, 2023, partly 2024, and partly 2025) of existing songs by different artists. They have often reached high positions on the UK Singles Chart, and the original versions often receive a sales boost. Ellie Goulding, Gabrielle Aplin, Lily Allen, Aurora, Tom Odell and Vaults are among the artists whose music has appeared in a John Lewis Christmas advert. In 2018, Sir Elton John became the first artist to perform and star in the advert. In 2021, Lola Young was chosen to cover the 1980s hit "Together in Electric Dreams", with a slowed down arrangement which had alt-folk duo the Portraits accusing the retailer of copying them and their version of the song recorded in 2020.

London-based agency Adam & Eve/DDB have conceived the adverts since 2009. But Saatchi and Saatchi have recently taken on responsibility for the retailer's advertising. The adverts have led to some fierce competition, most notably from Sainsbury's, Marks & Spencer and Boots.

== Campaigns ==
| No. | Title | Directed by | Original release date | UK viewers (millions) | Online Viewers |
|---|---|---|---|---|---|
| 1 | "Shadows" | Michael Gracey | December 2007 | TBD | TBA |
Christmas 2007 saw the first John Lewis television advertisement in three years, with a six million pound campaign, their biggest seasonal ad spend up to that point. The commercial did not feature the hallmarks of later campaigns such as an emotional denouement or slowed-down cover version, instead using Prokofiev's morning serenade from Romeo and Juliet. It features presents and products being carefully assembled positioned to eventually create a shadow image of a woman and a dog in the snow, in the style of artists Tim Noble and Sue Webster.
| 2 | "Clues" | Malcolm Venville | December 2008 | TBD | TBA |
For a second year, Lowe and Partners were the agency behind the John Lewis Christmas ad, a montage of people of all ages and their ideal gifts with the tagline "If you know the person, you'll find the present". Directed by Malcolm Venville, this was the first to feature the now-traditional cover version, with "From Me to You" by the Beatles recorded by unnamed employees of John Lewis. The full track was made available to download for free on the John Lewis website with an encouragement to donate to Wallace & Gromit's Children's Foundation.
| 3 | "The Feeling" | Benito Montorio | December 2009 | TBD | TBA |
The 2009 advertisement was the first for John Lewis by agency Adam & Eve (now part of DDB Worldwide), who went on to create the subsequent Christmas campaigns. Featuring a cover of the Guns N' Roses song "Sweet Child o' Mine" by Taken by Trees, the commercial features young children opening gifts usually given to adults such as a coffee machine and a laptop. With the tagline "Remember how Christmas used to feel", the final scene shows a girl unwrapping a camera and becoming a woman.
| 4 | "A Tribute to Givers" | Eric Lynne | December 2010 | TBD | TBA |
Ellie Goulding's cover of the Elton John song "Your Song" was the soundtrack to a collection of images showing people preparing gifts for their loved ones. Most notably, two parents attempt to secretly carry a rocking horse up some stairs whilst their children watch television. The advert concludes with a boy taking a stocking of presents outside to his pet dog in the snow, and hanging it on the kennel.
| 5 | "The Long Wait" | Dougal Wilson | December 2011 | TBD | 8.23 |
Featuring The Smiths song "Please, Please, Please, Let Me Get What I Want" sung by Slow Moving Millie, the 2011 advert, the first of many directed by Dougal Wilson, featured a little boy impatiently counting down the days to Christmas. On Christmas Eve, he wolfs down his dinner and goes to bed early in preparation for the next day. When he awakes on Christmas morning, the little boy jumps out of bed, runs straight past a large pile of presents at the bottom of his bed and heads for the wardrobe. He then wanders into his parents bedroom, waking them to give them the gift he wrapped himself and had been waiting to give them.
| 6 | "The Journey" | Dougal Wilson | December 2012 | TBD | 6.9 |
Using 20-year-old Gabrielle Aplin's version of the Frankie Goes to Hollywood classic "The Power of Love", the 2012 advert showed a snowman who traversed fields, a river, a mountain to obtain a perfect Christmas gift for Mrs. Snowman. The advert was very quickly followed up by a children's picture book which was hastily written and published immediately after the advert's first screening. The song was the first song from the John Lewis Christmas adverts to be a UK Singles Chart number one.
| 7 | "The Bear and the Hare" | Elliot Dear and Yves Geleyn | December 2013 | TBD | 17.2 |
Set to a cover of Keane's "Somewhere Only We Know" by British singer Lily Allen, the 2013 campaign featured an array of woodland animals in a classical Disney style and setting. The full advert lasted 2 minutes, and was made with 2D animation. It told the story of a bear hibernating before Christmas, before being persuaded to wake up by the titular hare to see Christmas in all its splendour. The accompanying music quickly rose to the top of the UK Singles Chart, doing so twice more in later weeks. A portion of the song's sales earnings were donated to Save the Children's Philippine Typhoon Appeal campaign.
| 8 | "Monty the Penguin" | Dougal Wilson | 7 November 2014 | N/A | 27.57 |
In their press release ahead of the 2014 campaign launch, John Lewis stated that the strapline for the advert was "Give someone the Christmas they've been wishing for". They added that "the heartwarming advert tells the tale of an unlikely friendship between a little boy Sam and his penguin friend Monty." British singer-songwriter Tom Odell recorded a cover for the advert of the 1977 John Lennon song "Real Love", which was the last official song recorded by the Beatles after being released in 1996, prior to another being released in 2023.
| 9 | "The Man on the Moon" | Kim Gehrig | 6 November 2015 | N/A | 29.99 |
Featuring a cover of Oasis' 1994 B-side "Half the World Away", sung by Norwegian singer Aurora, the 2015 campaign tells the story of a young girl trying to contact an old man spotted living alone on the Moon. Her attempts to catch the man's attention fail until she sends him a special delivery of a telescope, via hot-air balloon, and the man finally gets to see Earth on Christmas night. The strapline for the advert is "Show someone they're loved this Christmas", with the company teaming up with the charity Age UK. The advert, the first of the brand's Christmastime commercials that was directed by a woman – Kim Gehrig –, is estimated to have cost around £7 million.
| 10 | "Buster the Boxer" | Dougal Wilson | 10 November 2016 | N/A | 27.9 |
The music for the 2016 campaign is a cover of Randy Crawford's "One Day I'll Fly Away", performed by English electronica band Vaults. The Dougal Wilson-directed advert was released on Thursday 10 November and made its TV debut at 9.15pm on ITV. The adverts follows the story of a young girl, several wild animals and a Boxer dog named Buster. On Christmas eve, the young girl's father builds a trampoline in the garden, only for two foxes and a badger to begin jumping on the trampoline, later joined by two squirrels and a hedgehog. As the animals play, Buster watches from the living room. On Christmas Day, the girl runs down the stairs and into the garden to find the trampoline, only for Buster to leap onto it and do some jumping himself. It was reported that the advert cost £1 million to make, £6 million cheaper than last year's advert. A portion of the soft toy animals sales earnings were donated to The Wildlife Trusts.
| 11 | "Moz the Monster" | Michel Gondry | 10 November 2017 | N/A | 10.29 |
The Michel Gondry-helmed advert features a cover of The Beatles' "Golden Slumbers", performed by the band Elbow. It tells the story of a boy who is afraid of the dark, and a monster named Moz who lives under his bed. Scared of the dark, the boy looks under his bed one night to find that Moz is resting there. Although the child is at first scared, then irritated by the monster's antics, the two very quickly become friends, although the boy quickly begins to become tired in the day due to playing with Moz at night. That Christmas, the child finds a gift under the tree that his family don't seem to recognise. Opening it, he finds a nightlight. When the nightlight is on, he can't see his new friend any more, but once he turns it off, he realises that Moz is still there after all. Following its premiere, author and illustrator Chris Riddell accused John Lewis of plagiarising elements of the advert from his 1986 children's book Mr Underbed. Citing the similar themes of a child befriending a fluffy monster who lived under their bed, he stated that it was "very generous of John Lewis to devote their Christmas advertising campaign to my 1986 picture book... in this age of shrinking publicity budgets". John Lewis defended the accusations, stating that the respective storylines of both works were "utterly different" (with the ad focusing primarily on the friendship between Moz and the child, and Mr Underbed having a child discover other creatures who lived in his room), and that monsters under the bed were a common concept that had been the subject of numerous works. The controversy heightened demand for the book, with copies of Mr Underbed quickly selling out from stores.
| 12 | "The Boy & The Piano" | Seb Edwards | 15 November 2018 | N/A | 6.65 |
Beginning with Elton John playing the opening notes of "Your Song" (as previously covered by Ellie Goulding in the 2010 advert), he then reminisces about his life and career in reverse, eventually culminating with Christmas Day in the 1950s when he received a piano for Christmas from his mother. As a teaser for the advert, ITV changed the theme tunes on several of its programmes to piano arrangements prior to its premiere, and some John Lewis & Partners stores hid the "Lewis" from their signage to leave only "John". In 2019, the commercial won the Visual Effects Society Award for Outstanding Visual Effects in a Commercial.
| 13 | "Excitable Edgar" | Dougal Wilson | 14 November 2019 | N/A | TBA |
Edgar, a young dragon, is so excited about Christmas that he cannot control the flames from his mouth. He even burns the village Christmas tree, dampening everyone's Christmas spirit. But when his best friend Ava gives him a thoughtful gift just right for an excitable dragon, he realises how much she cares for him. The advert features Bastille covering REO Speedwagon's "Can't Fight This Feeling" with the London Contemporary Orchestra.
| 14 | "Give A Little Love" | Oscar Hudson | 13 November 2020 | N/A | 2.01 |
A young boy gave some love in a snow-heart to a snowman, who passed the happiness onto a snowman-couple with a missing tyre, by taking its middle body out, transforming it into a heart-balloon. A little love is slowly spread from person to person throughout the video. "A little love" refers to the small things each person does in the video. The advert features a song titled "A Little Love". Written and recorded by Celeste, this is the first instance of a song being commissioned specifically for the Christmas campaign, rather than a cover of an existing track.
| 15 | "An Unexpected Guest" | Mark Molloy | 4 November 2021 | 3.1 | TBA |
A boy called Nathan notices an object fall from the sky whilst on a bus. He gets off his bus and runs into the forest to spot a spaceship and an alien called Skye. He runs away before eventually showing her his light up Christmas jumper. He then goes on to show many staples of Christmas; Christmas trees, mince pies, light up displays. Later on, he notices an electromagnetic pulse and runs back to the forest, where he sees Skye about to leave. He gives her his jumper and she kisses him. The advert features a cover of the Philip Oakey and Giorgio Moroder song "Together in Electric Dreams" by London pub singer Lola Young.
| 16 | "The Beginner" | Steve Rogers | 10 November 2022 | 4.1 | 4.1 |
A man is practising to skate for the first time and always trips up and falls. As he continues to try, the man's wife phones someone telling them that they are looking forward to something. Later on, it is revealed that both have adopted a young girl, Ellie, who was in the care system. Ellie, who has a passion for skateboarding begins bonding with her new dad. The campaign is a partnership with Action for Children and Who Cares Scotland? to raise awareness of children in care. The advert features a cover of Blink-182's song, "All The Small Things" performed by Postmodern Jukebox featuring Mike Geier (under the stage name Puddles Pity Party).
| 17 | "Snapper" | Megaforce | 9 November 2023 | N/A | TBA |
A young boy finds a grow your own "perfect Christmas tree" box at a local market and plants the seed at home and however the plant turns out to be a Venus flytrap named Snapper. The advert features a single from Andrea Bocelli called "Festa".
| 18 | "The Gifting Hour" | François Rousselet | 14 November 2024 | N/A | TBA |
A woman named Sally (Margaret Clunie) goes shopping in a John Lewis on Oxford Street to buy her sister a present for Christmas, where she falls through a rack of dresses and ends up revisiting her sister at various moments during her life to try to figure out what to buy her. The sisters tearfully reconnect after a period of estrangement. The advert features an acoustic version of The Verve's single "Sonnet" by the band's former frontman Richard Ashcroft.
| 19 | "Where Love Lives" | Jonathan Aldric | 4 November 2025 | N/A | TBA |
It’s Christmas Day in the Cunningham household. Among the crumpled wrapping paper, a father (Roberto Davide) finds one last unopened present - a vinyl of Where Love Lives. As the record plays, he’s transported back to a 90s nightclub. Through the lights and movement he spots his teenage son (Jack Aldridge) who’s felt distant lately. The crowd disappears, and for a moment, the years between them fade away. The dance floor becomes a space of memory, connection, and unconditional love. Back home, father and son share an embrace and dance as Labrinth's reimagined Where Love Lives fills the room. The ending caption reads 'If you can't find the words, find the gift'. The charity partner for this year's advert is Building Happier Futures.
| 20 | "Gloria & Pickles" | Lucy Forbes | 3 November 2026 | TBD | TBA |
It's Christmas Eve and disgruntled grandmother Gloria (Kristin Scott Thomas) has to think of a gift for her grandchildren when they arrive after a long journey. She attempts to entertain them with her old toy collection, to which the grandchildren are not amused, leaving Gloria unsure on what they want. She initially decides to give envelopes of cash as she is not confident in choosing a gift they will genuinely love, until old toy 'Pickles the Dog' (Paul Whitehouse) comes to life, urging her to "Do better than cash". This leads to Gloria being taken on a last minute mission by Pickles to find the perfect gift for her grandchildren, before arriving at John Lewis. On Christmas Day, she surprises the grandchildren with a magical wonderland in her home office - with the ending caption 'Don't give up on giving'.

== Songs featured ==
| Year of advert | Title | Release date | Artists | Original artists | Peak position |
|---|---|---|---|---|---|
| 2009 | "Sweet Child o' Mine" | 23 November 2009 | Taken by Trees | Guns N' Roses | 23 |
| 2010 | "Your Song" | 12 November 2010 | Ellie Goulding | Elton John | 2 |
| 2011 | "Please Please Please, Let Me Get What I Want" | 11 November 2011 | Slow Moving Millie | The Smiths | 31 |
| 2012 | "The Power of Love" | 9 November 2012 | Gabrielle Aplin | Frankie Goes to Hollywood | 1 |
| 2013 | "Somewhere Only We Know" | 10 November 2013 | Lily Allen | Keane | 1 |
| 2014 | "Real Love" | 6 November 2014 | Tom Odell | The Beatles | 7 |
| 2015 | "Half the World Away" | 6 November 2015 | Aurora | Oasis | 11 |
| 2016 | "One Day I'll Fly Away" | 10 November 2016 | Vaults | Randy Crawford | 53 |
| 2017 | "Golden Slumbers" | 10 November 2017 | Elbow | The Beatles | 29 |
| 2018 | "Your Song" | 8 February 1971 (Note: Already released prior to its use in the Christmas advert.) | Elton John | | 7 (in 1971) |
| 2019 | "Can't Fight This Feeling" | 19 November 2019 | Bastille feat. London Contemporary Orchestra | REO Speedwagon | 39 |
| 2020 | "A Little Love" | 13 November 2020 | Celeste | | 59 |
| 2021 | "Together in Electric Dreams" | 4 November 2021 | Lola Young | Giorgio Moroder and Philip Oakey | DNC |
| 2022 | "All the Small Things" | 17 April 2017 | Scott Bradlee's Postmodern Jukebox feat. Puddles Pity Party | Blink-182 | DNC |
| 2023 | "Festa" | 9 November 2023 | Andrea Bocelli | | DNC |
| 2024 | "Sonnet" | 6 October 2021 | Richard Ashcroft | The Verve | DNC |
| 2025 | "Where Love Lives" | 4 November 2025 | Labrinth | Alison Limerick | DNC |
| 2025 | "Where Love Lives" | November 1990 | Alison Limerick | Alison Limerick | 9 (in 1996) |
| 2026 | "You Can't Always Get What You Want" | 3 November 2026 | Sam Fender feat. Easington Colliery Band and John Spence Community High School choir | The Rolling Stones | 39 |

== Awards ==
John Lewis was honoured at the 2012 IPA Effectiveness Awards for their campaigns up to that point. They were awarded the top prize which is awarded to companies "showcasing and rewarding campaigns that demonstrate their marketing payback".
