= Strange (Celeste song) =

2019 single by Celeste

- Cover for the studio version

Single by Celeste

from the album Not Your Muse
- Released: 4 September 2019
- Genre: Soul
- Length: 3:20 (studio version); 4:15 (album version); 5:03 (live version)
- Label: Polydor
- Songwriters: Celeste Waite; Stephen Wrabel; Jamie Hartman
- Producer: Jamie Hartman

Celeste singles chronology
"Coco Blood" (2019)	"Strange" (2019)	"Stop This Flame" (2020)

Music video
- "Strange" on YouTube

Audio sample
- Audio sample of the song's chorus.: file; help

"Strange" is a song by British singer and songwriter Celeste. The song was released on 4 September 2019 through Both Sides and Polydor Records as the lead single from her debut studio album Not Your Muse (2021). It was written by Celeste, Stephen Wrabel, and Jamie Hartman, who also produced the track. She released a live version of the song on 20 September 2019, as well as the song's music video in November 2019. The original version has been edited for radio play on the version titled "Strange (Edit)", therefore excluding an extra verse towards the end of the song.

== Background and composition ==
Celeste premiered the song at the BBC Music Introducing concert at The Lexington in February 2019. She told BBC, "You never know how you're gonna feel when you perform something for the first time and how people are going to react to it, and I had such a warm response and it seemed like it was a memorable song for people in that moment." Celeste told the Evening Standard, "They identified it as a special song."

"Strange" is "a tale of lost friendships and broken relationships". In the chorus, Celeste ponders: "Isn't it strange? / How people can change / From strangers to friends / Friends into lovers / And strangers again" over silky strings and a "haunting and delicate" piano melody.

The song was written and recorded in Los Angeles during the 2018 California wildfires. Robin Murray from Clash noted that the damaged areas were "transformed into these hideous alien realms which [Waite] began to view [as] counterpoints to her own emotional turmoil." She told Idolator, "I began to think of all the destruction the fires caused, the loss, the isolation, people finding themselves in a situation where they have no home, no sense of familiarity," After hearing Celeste sing "Tried to see through all the smoke," David Smyth from Evening Standard wrote, "her voice trails off close to silence, as though she isn't quite sure of the words." Celeste commented on this statement, saying "It's become one of my favourite songs I've written, because it allows me to live in the imperfections of my voice... The air was thick with smoke, which is why my voice sounds more husky than it is usually." Modestas Mankus from Our Culture Mag wrote, "Celeste brings us a melancholic mood through a melodious voice and soft ad-like piano."

"Strange" is composed in the key of D major with a slow tempo of 68 beats per minute. The song features strings from musician Sebastian Plano.

== Reception ==
Modestas Mankus from Our Culture Mag wrote:

Celeste's ability to explore an event that is so distressing to access her own past and personal experience of loss showcase a side of Celeste that has been previously visible in her previous work. Celeste has established herself as an artist who can mould and bring out authenticity and passion with fluency and maturity that not many artists can do so quickly in their careers,

Idolator ranked the song at number 34 on their list of The 75 Best Pop Songs Of 2019. Apple Music also listed it as one of The 100 Best Songs of 2019.

== Music video ==
The music video for "Strange" was shot in Bulgaria in October 2019, and released on 7 November 2019. Celeste told Dork that the video "begins at the end and comes full circle, representing the reckless behaviours which can lead you from being lovers to strangers." A French lyric video illustrated by Toby Calo was released on Celeste's social media platforms on Christmas Day 2019.

== Live performances ==
Celeste made her late night television debut when she performed the song on Later... with Jools Holland in October 2019. Following her performance of "Strange" at the 2020 Brit Awards, Celeste saw interest from other big names in the pop music industry who attended the ceremony such as Billie Eilish, Camilla Cabello, Finneas, and Stormzy. She has also made her American television debut with the song on The Late Late Show with James Corden, as well as her French television debut with the song on C à vous.

== Uses in other media ==
The episode "Make Rebecca Great Again" of the Apple TV show Ted Lasso featured "Strange" played over the last several minutes extending into the end credits.

The episode "The Duke and I" of the Netflix show Bridgerton featured a classical cover of "Strange".

The final episode of the first season of another Netflix show by the name of Sex/Life, entitled “This Must Be the Place”, also featured the song.

The song was also used in season 2, episode 6 entitled "My Druthers" of the popular Netflix series Outer Banks as the episode drew to a close. As a result, the song received a viral resurgence on TikTok and other social media sites, with more than 192.4K videos created on TikTok as of December 11, 2022.

In 2024 the song was used in Netflix tv series "Nobody Wants This" season 1, episode 10 (season finale).

The song was also used in season 1, episode 7 of the 2024 Australian based tv show, “High Country,” during the closing scene.

== Credits and personnel ==
Credits adapted from Tidal:

- Celeste Waite: vocals, composer, lyricist
- Jamie Hartman: producer, lyricist, composer, piano, vocal producer
- Stephen Wrabel: lyricist, composer
- Sebastian Plano: strings, string director
- Tom Elmhirst: mixer, studio personnel

== Charts ==
Chart performance for "Strange"
Chart (2019–2021)	Peak position
Belgium (Ultratop 50 Flanders)	47
Belgium Airplay (Ultratop Flanders)	39
Belgium Urban (Ultratop Flanders)	12
Ireland (IRMA)	61
New Zealand Hot Singles (RMNZ)	23
Scottish Singles Sales (Official Charts)	68
UK Singles (Official Charts)	82

== Certifications ==
Certifications for "Strange"
Region	Certification	Certified units/sales
Brazil (Pro-Música Brasil)	Gold	20,000^{‡}
France (SNEP)	Gold	100,000^{‡}
New Zealand (RMNZ)	Gold	15,000^{‡}
United Kingdom (BPI)	Gold	400,000^{‡}
^{‡} Sales+streaming figures based on certification alone.

== Release history ==
Region	Date	Format	Version	Label
Various	4 September 2019	Airplay, CD, digital download, streaming	Edited version	Universal Music Group, Polydor
Various	20 September 2019	Digital download, streaming	Acoustic	Universal Music Group, Polydor
