= Celeste (singer) =

British singer (born 1994)

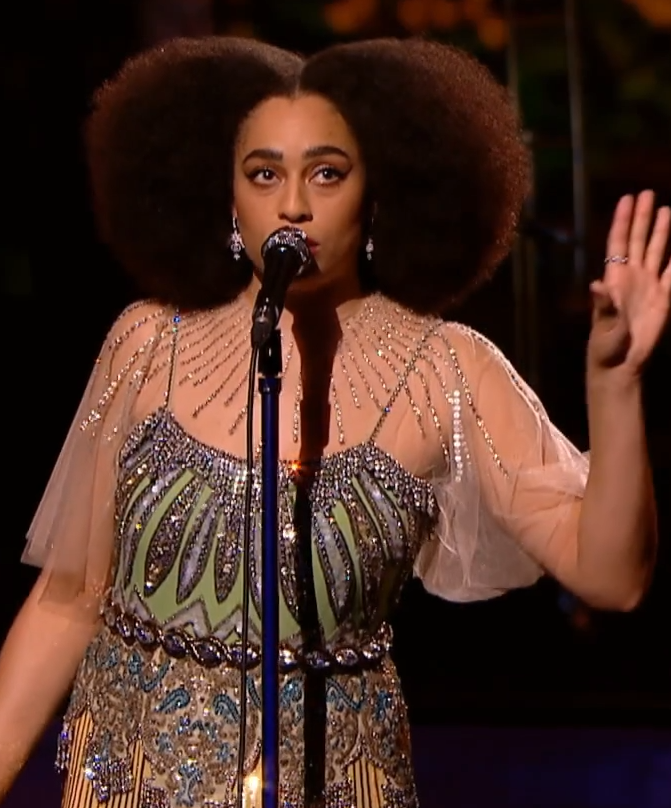
- Celeste at the 2020 Royal Variety Performance

Background information
- Born: Celeste Epiphany Waite; 5 May 1994 (age 32); Culver City, California, U.S.
- Origin: Brighton, East Sussex, England
- Genres: British soul; alternative R&B; jazz; neo-soul
- Occupations: Singer; songwriter
- Instruments: Vocals
- Years active: 2014–present
- Labels: Polydor; Interscope
- Website: celesteofficial.com

Celeste Epiphany Waite (born 5 May 1994), known by the mononym Celeste, is an English singer and songwriter. She began her career in 2014 providing vocals for electronic producers such as Avicii, Tieks and Real Lies, while also self-publishing music onto SoundCloud on the side. She made her solo debut via Lily Allen's vanity label Bank Holiday Records with the EP The Milk & the Honey (2017), and then released her second EP Lately (2019) after signing with Polydor Records in 2018.

In 2019, Celeste topped the BBC's annual Sound of... poll and won the Rising Star Award at the Brit Awards. Her debut album Not Your Muse was released in 2021 and debuted atop the UK Albums Chart. It earned her nominations for Album of the Year, Best Female Solo Artist and Best New Artist at the 2021 Brit Awards, as well as the 2021 Mercury Prize. In the same year, Celeste was also nominated for the Academy Award for Best Original Song for co-writing her song "Hear My Voice" from the film The Trial of the Chicago 7 (2020).

== Early life and education ==
Celeste Epiphany Waite was born in Culver City, California, on 5 May 1994, to an English mother and a Jamaican father. Her mother had been working as a make-up artist in the U.S., after graduating from beauty school in London. Her father had moved to the U.S. from Jamaica to be with his mother while she studied at university. Following her parents' separation, Celeste moved to her mother's native United Kingdom, settling in Dagenham at the age of three, before moving to the village of Saltdean on the outskirts of Brighton at the age of five, where she spent most of her early years.

At the age of 10, Celeste spent a year doing ballet at a performing arts school. She recalls becoming interested in music through discovering Aretha Franklin, whose music was played throughout her family home, before discovering her own music from names such as Thelonious Monk, Koko Taylor through YouTube and iTunes at the age of 14. Celeste recalls singing hymns at church in Brighton as one of her earliest musical memories. When Celeste was 16, her father died of lung cancer, aged 49.

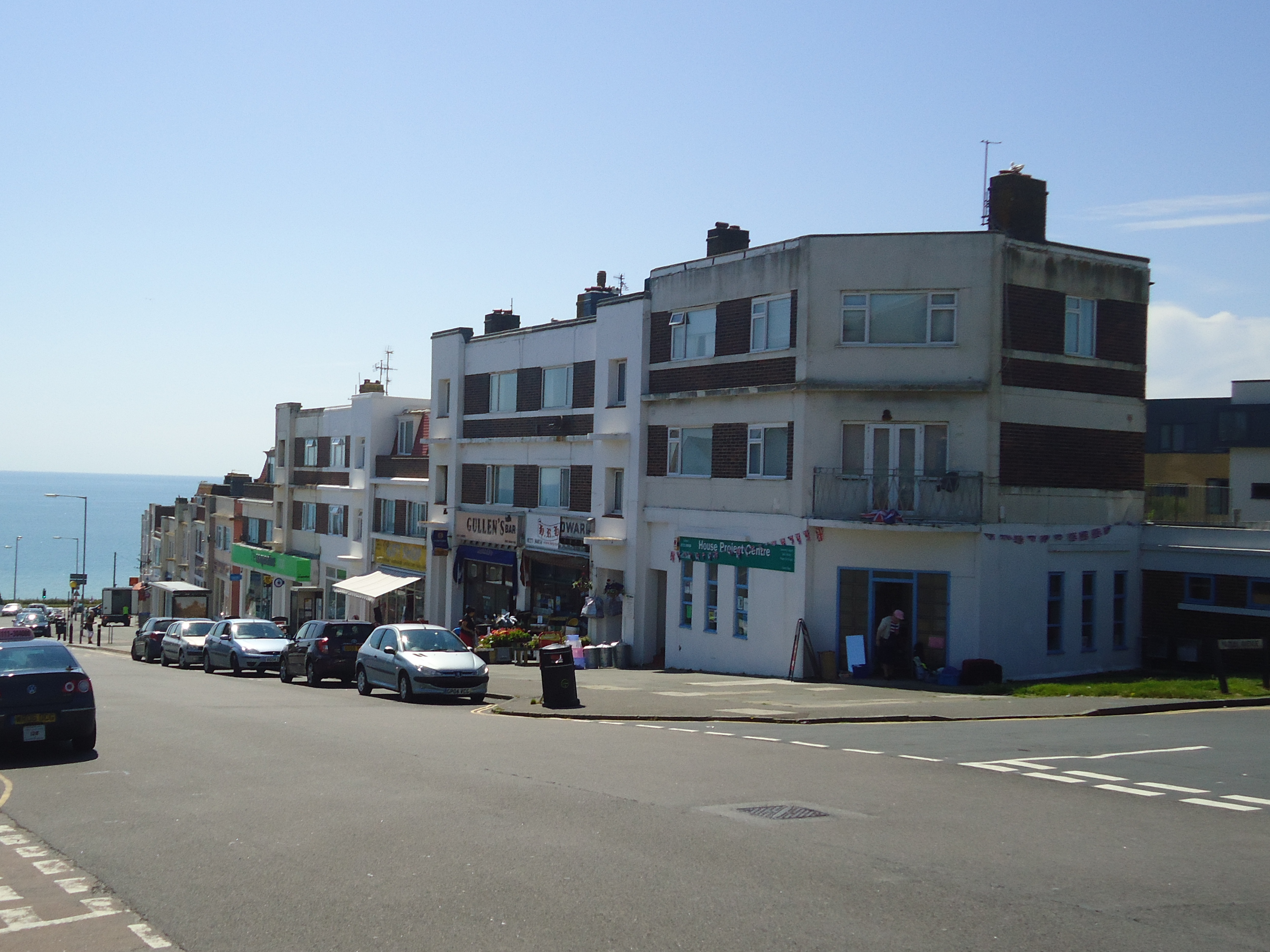
Celeste's local Saltdean charity shop where she worked at age 17.

As a teenager, Celeste would write music and perform in bands. She "accidentally" wrote her first song, "Sirens", with her former bandmates at the age of 16. The song was inspired by the death of her father and was published to YouTube where it got the attention of her current manager. Her manager arranged studio sessions for her at Sarm West Studios in Notting Hill, where the crew would give her more time in the studio. At 18, she started working in the studio after she graduated and began taking her music career seriously, while playing her first gigs in and around Brighton. Celeste studied Music Technology at Varndean College for her sixth form education.

Celeste told Annie Mac that while her friends asked for driving lessons as their 18th birthday gift, she asked for a MacBook laptop which she would later use to begin recording herself on GarageBand. Celeste published her first SoundCloud song, "Born Again" to the platform in July 2014. The song, which was produced by Tev'n, was described by Jim Carroll of The Irish Times as "a striking blast of soulful, seductive vocals backed by a ghostly electronic r'n'b groove." Throughout 2014, Celeste published more songs such as "DEVIL" and "What's Your Poison?", the latter of which is the only 2014 song that remains on her SoundCloud account. In November 2014, she compiled those three songs into a four-track self-titled EP to the platform. The EP which was described by Vice as a "combination of melancholic pop and glitchy electronic tracks." Celeste also started her BBC musical journey when she uploaded her song "North Circular" onto the BBC Music Introducing website in 2014, where it gained support from DJs on BBC Radio 1. She featured on British dance producer Tieks' 2014 debut single "Sing That Song" which reached No. 90 on the UK Singles Chart. She also featured on Swedish musician Avicii's song "Touch Me" in 2015, prior to making her solo mononymous debut. It was during this time that Celeste assisted electronic duo Real Lies as a vocalist while they toured with Foals in 2015.

Celeste completed her GCE Advanced Levels in Music and Textiles in 2016 before working at the local pub in Rottingdean.

== Career ==
=== 2016–2017: The Milk and The Honey ===
Celeste released her debut single "Daydreaming" under Lily Allen's record label, Bank Holiday Records, in October 2016. The song was produced by London-based producer J. D. Reid and Tev'n. She wrote the song while working in her local Black Horse pub in Rottingdean. She told i-D: "I couldn't wait to leave! I was pulling pints and listening to Shirley Bassey imagining I was in Carnegie Hall doing a performance in floor length fur." Celeste made her radio debut in December 2016 when BBC Radio 1 presenter Annie Mac played "Daydreaming" after announcing Celeste as one of her "New Names". The song was added to the BBC Radio 1Xtra playlist in February 2017.

Celeste released her debut EP, The Milk & the Honey, under Bank Holiday Records in March 2017. The 3-track EP includes the tracks "Milk & Honey", "Chocolate" and "Daydreaming". Celeste told The Line of Best Fit that the song "Milk & Honey" is about "finding some sort of Nirvana". She continued by saying that the song "touches upon [her] aspirations of wealth and love and visions [she has] had dreams about, and reminisces on times of melancholy." Eugenie Johnson of DIY compared Celeste's vocals on "Chocolate" to that of Billie Holiday. The EP also received support from Beats 1 presenter Julie Adenuga.

Following the EP's release, Celeste completed a month-long residency at a venue named Laylow in Ladbroke Grove. It was here where Celeste began performing for celebrities such as Riz Ahmed and Idris Elba. "Spike Lee picked up one of my records and I signed it for him, which I never ever expected," Celeste told NME. She embarked on her second-ever UK tour as a supporting act, this time with Rae Morris in September 2017.

Celeste released the promotional single "Not For Me" in October 2017. Celeste described the single as "a song about unrequited love and falling out of love with the city that [she] grew up in, London." She originally wanted the song to be on her first EP, The Milk & the Honey, but lost it on the digital file system. She released it as an independent single after finding it a few months later. Celeste embarked on her third-ever supporting tour of the UK and Europe with the band Skinny Living in October 2017. She played her last show supporting Roy Ayers at The Jazz Café in London in late November 2017.

=== 2018–2019: Lately ===
Celeste signed to Polydor Records where she caught the attention of singer-songwriter Michael Kiwanuka, who was already on the label. Throughout 2018, Celeste released the singles "Lately" as well as a live version of the song "Both Sides of the Moon". The two songs were recorded by UK production collective Gotts Street Park and were released ahead of Celeste's second EP, Lately which was to be released in March 2019. In January 2020, Celeste told NME that "Both Sides of the Moon" was her favourite song to write and record, stating "It was the first song at the time that I felt used all of the lyrics and imagery that I'd wanted to for so long in a song, but also had a sonic that I'd been trying to achieve for a while". Celeste signed to Warner Chappell Music publishing company in December 2018, before releasing the single "Father's Son", a "heartbreaking examination of absent fathers", in January 2019. She saw support when "Father's Son" was promoted on BBC Radio 6 Music by Tom Robinson in March 2019, as well as when "Both Sides of the Moon" was played on BBC Radio 1 by Annie Mac and Huw Stephens in October 2019, "Both Sides of the Moon" was also played on Beats 1 by Elton John, who noted: "Celeste is quite something else...watch out for her." The song was also picked for Apple Music's Best of 2018 playlist.

Celeste released her second extended play titled Lately in March 2019. The five-track EP features "Both Sides of the Moon (Live)", "Lately", "Father's Son", "Summer (ft. Jeshi)" and "Ugly Thoughts". The EP charted on the British, German, French and Spanish iTunes charts. Shannon Mahanty of The Guardian wrote, "Proving Celeste's deft ability to sever a heartstring, [Lately] moves from the soul-tinged jazz of the title track, to sultry toxic love ballad 'Both Sides of the Moon', via 'Father's Son'". Celeste performed a showcase at SXSW under BBC Radio 1 in March 2019, as well as a BBC Music Introducing session at Maida Vale Studios in April 2019. Celeste supported Neneh Cherry at the Brighton Festival in May 2019, and performed on the BBC Music Introducing stage at Glastonbury Festival as well as at Field Day in June 2019. Gemma Samways from NME described Celeste's debut Primavera Sound set in June 2019 as "spellbinding", noting that "next year she'll be on a much, much bigger stage."

In the latter half of 2019, Celeste released 4 singles, namely "Coco Blood", "She's My Sunshine" and both a studio and live version of "Strange". "Coco Blood" was described by Savannah Sicurella of Paste as a "warm coming-of-age song" that references Celeste's British-Jamaican heritage. Celeste ventured to Jamaica to film the music video which was directed by Akinola Davids, also known as Crack Stevens. Celeste collaborated with Mulberry in June 2019 when she performed at the inaugural #MulberryMyLocal event in London. She provided the theme song for the acclaimed BBC documentary programme Black Hollywood: They Gotta Have Us in July 2019. In October 2019, Celeste supported Janelle Monáe for a night at Columbiahalle in Berlin. She made her television debut when she performed "Strange" on an episode of Later... with Jools Holland on 24 October 2019.

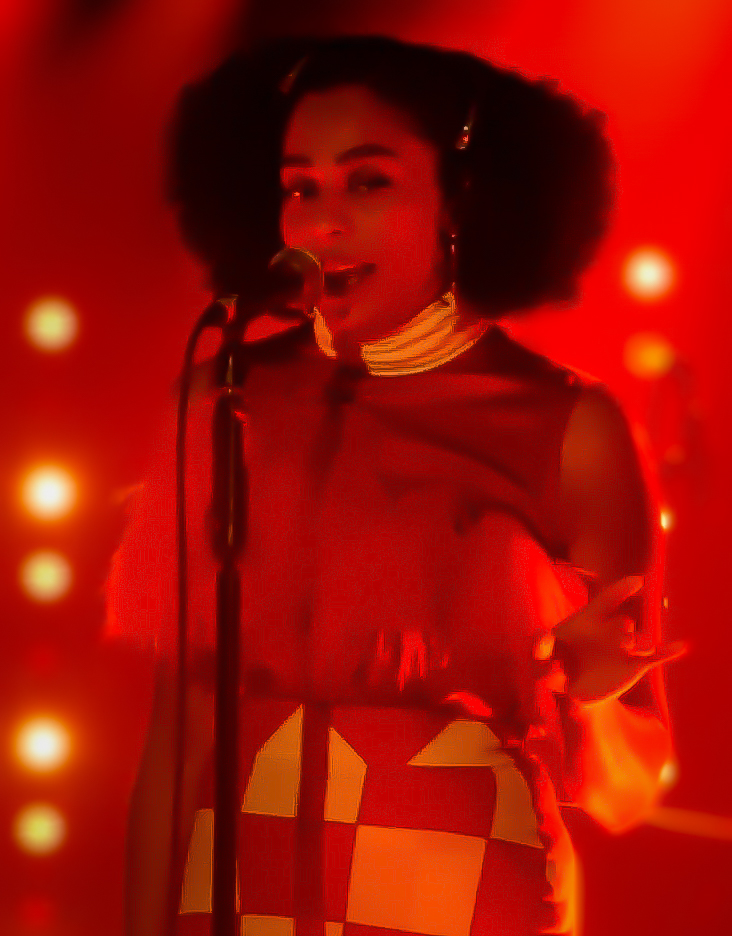
Celeste at Omeara in 2019

In November 2019, Elton John added "Strange" and "She's My Sunshine" to his personal Apple Music playlist. Celeste gained support from English television personality James Corden after he tweeted "I cannot stop listening to [Celeste] this is her song Strange. It's sensational. I dare you not to love her. I dare you x" Celeste sold out a three-night residency at Omeara in London, before embarking on a tour supporting Michael Kiwanuka in November 2019. On 3 December 2019, Celeste won the BBC Music Award for BBC Music Introducing Artist of the Year. Following this, she appeared on BBC Radio 4's Woman's Hour segment where she talked about her musical upbringing.

On 6 December 2019, the British Phonographic Industry announced that Celeste was the winner of the Rising Star Award at the 2020 Brit Awards and that she would be receiving the award and performing at the ceremony in February 2020. This was followed by the release of Compilation 1.1, a collection of Celeste's "best singles so far". The project is a re-issue of the EP Lately, with "Strange" and "Coco Blood" as additional songs. Celeste took to Twitter to promote the project, saying: "All of my releases so far in one place, Compilation 1.1 is available to stream now". Celeste was later longlisted in the annual poll of 170 music critics, Sound of 2020 by BBC, who admired her for her "Timeless soul to tug at your heartstrings" and specifically noted her as "the one to beat" following her previous accolades from the Brit Awards and BBC Music Introducing.

While in Paris, Celeste made her French television debut when she performed "Strange" after actors Timothée Chalamet, Saoirse Ronan and Florence Pugh promoted their film Little Women (2019) on an episode of the French talk show C à vous in December 2019. She also later performed the song on the New Year's special of Top of the Pops on BBC One.

=== 2020–present: Not Your Muse ===
During the 2020 New Year, Celeste was predicted as a breakthrough act for the year by publications such as Vogue, The Guardian, NME, GQ, The Independent, and Ticketmaster UK. On 9 January 2020, Celeste was announced as the winner of BBC's music poll Sound of 2020, before she released her first single of the year, "Stop This Flame". GQ named Celeste as "the most hotly tipped singer for 2020." after the release of "Stop This Flame". Celeste made her first appearance on BBC World News on the Breakfast segment, before having her single "Stop This Flame" debuted on BBC Radio 1 by Annie Mac. Compilation 1.1 reached No. 1 on the UK's iTunes Chart following her BBC Sound of 2020 win.

Celeste made her American late-night television debut when she performed "Strange" on The Late Late Show with James Corden in late January 2020. She was featured alongside Maisie Peters on the front cover of Music Week in January 2020. Following Celeste's performance of "Strange" at the 2020 Brit Awards, Celeste saw interest from other big names in the pop music industry who attended the ceremony such as Billie Eilish, Camila Cabello, Finneas, and Stormzy. In late March 2020, Celeste made the front cover of The Sunday Times Style, where she was named "fashion's new front-row star".

In April 2020 she did a virtual performance from her bedroom on The Graham Norton Show to encourage social distancing during the COVID-19 pandemic. For the April 2020 fundraiser telecast, The Big Night In, Celeste performed a cover of Bill Withers' "Lean on Me" and also appeared in the Live Lounge Allstars' charity single "Times Like These." Celeste and Sam Smith were the only two artists to do solo musical performances in the telecast. The charity single was Celeste's first No. 1 and her first top 10 entry in the UK. She planned to embark on her first headlining tour of Europe in April 2020, however these shows were cancelled due to the same coronavirus pandemic.

Celeste released the single "I Can See The Change", which was produced by Grammy-winning musician Finneas, in late May 2020. She was nominated in the Best New International Act category at the 2020 BET Awards. She recorded a cover version of Bob Marley's "One Love" for the brand Oakley as part of their "For the Love of Sport" campaign in August 2020. Celeste subsequently released the non-album single, "Little Runaway", alongside a music video. During this time, her single "Stop This Flame" was popular becoming the theme song for Sky Sports' weekend coverage (Saturday Night Football) of the Premier League.

Celeste performed and recorded three songs for the original soundtrack for the film The Trial of the Chicago 7 (2020). One of these songs, "Hear My Voice", served as the lead single for the soundtrack album, and earned Celeste a nomination for Best Original Song at the 93rd Academy Awards. She was later nominated for Best Original Song at the 78th Golden Globe Awards with the same song. Celeste also provided the single "A Little Love" as the soundtrack to the 2020 John Lewis & Partners Christmas advert. She performed the song on the ninth-season finale of the British television music competition The Voice UK, as well as at the 2020 Royal Variety Performance. She also performed "Stop This Flame" and a cover of Nat King Cole's "Smile" during the 2020 BBC Sports Personality of the Year ceremony. Celeste and American jazz musician Jon Batiste provided a duet version of the song "It's All Right" inspired by the 2020 Disney-Pixar film Soul.

On 31 December 2020, she released the single "Love is Back" and performed it on Jools' Annual Hootenanny 2020/21, where she also performed "It's All Right" and a duet of "Blue Moon" with Tom Jones. Celeste would later perform "Love is Back" on the 449th episode of The Graham Norton Show in mid January 2021. Celeste's debut studio album titled Not Your Muse was released on 29 January 2021, and debuted at number one on the UK Albums Chart. Celeste sang the lullaby "Twinkle, Twinkle, Little Star" in a Super Bowl ad for Inspiration4, an all-civilian charity space mission. At the 2021 Brit Awards, she was nominated for Album of the Year, Best Female Solo Artist and Best New Artist. Not Your Muse was shortlisted for the 2021 Mercury Prize.

On 3 November 2023, Coca-Cola released a Christmas-themed advertisement on YouTube with Celeste singing a cover to 'Anyone Can Be Santa'.

In 2024, Celeste played a jazz club singer in the film Blitz, directed by Steve McQueen.

== Public image ==
Celeste's vocals and music are often compared to those of soul singers and Adele. Nick Reilly from NME described Celeste as a "once-in-a-generation talent" who is "the finest British soul singer to emerge in years." David Smyth from Evening Standard wrote, "it's obvious she has it in her to join the wall of fame very soon." Modestas Mankus from Our Culture Mag wrote: "Celeste has established herself as an artist who can mould and bring out authenticity and passion with fluency and maturity that not many artists can do so quickly in their careers [...], [her] consistency in putting out thoughtful and quality music puts her on a positive track to becoming a vastly influential figure in the world of music." BBC Radio 1 DJ Annie Mac said: "I have received countless emotional texts from listeners who have had to sit in their car and lose themselves to her song 'Strange' before carrying on with their evening. Her songwriting is personal and poignant but with universal appeal."

It appears she hasn't fully realised the sheer power and talent she has just yet.

— Yasmine Dankwah from Notion after attending one of Celeste's sold-out Omeara performances in November 2019.

Celeste draws from fashion from the 1960s and is inspired by The Supremes and Shirley Bassey. She is styled by Ella Lucia and has been scouted by Alessandro Michele of Gucci. In March 2020, Celeste made the front cover of Sunday Times Style, where she was named "fashion's new front-row star". In October 2020, Celeste was named by Elle magazine as one of "10 Trailblazing Women Changing the Future You Need to Know".

== Personal life ==
In 2017, Celeste moved to London with only £100 and was fired from her job as she would skip work to make music. She told the BBC: "I'd rather call in sick and go to the studio than have the money for that month." She currently resides on Ladbroke Grove, She is a keen football fan and an avid supporter of Arsenal F.C.

== Discography ==
=== Studio albums ===
Title	Details	Peak chart positions										Certifications
Title	Details	UK	AUT	BEL (FL)	BEL (WA)	FRA	GER	IRE	NLD	SCO	SWI	Certifications
Not Your Muse	Released: 29 January 2021; Label: Polydor; Format: CD, digital download, streaming, vinyl	1	4	1	48	95	6	24	6	1	6	BPI: Gold
Woman of Faces	Release date: 14 November 2025; Label: Polydor; Format: CD, digital download, streaming, vinyl	12	—	51	154	— (Note: Woman of Faces did not enter the Top French Albums chart, but peaked at number 73 on the French Physical Albums chart.)	—	—	59	3	—	

=== Extended plays ===
Title	Details
The Milk & the Honey	Released: 10 March 2017; Label: Bank Holiday, WMG; Format: Digital download, streaming
Lately	Released: 22 March 2019; Label: Polydor; Format: CD, Digital download, streaming, vinyl
Lately	Released: 22 April 2023; Label: UMG; Format: Digital download, streaming, vinyl

=== Single compilations ===
Title	Details	Peak chart positions			
Title	Details	UK Down.	UK Vinyl	BEL (FL)	SCO
Celeste (Note: A limited edition 10" phonograph single released during Record Store Day, consisting of four out of the five tracks on the EP Lately (2019).)	Released: 13 April 2019; Label: Polydor; Format: Vinyl	—	18	—	—
Compilation 1.1 (Note: A digital-exclusive re-issue of the EP Lately, adding on the two songs "Coco Blood" and "Strange".)	Released: 6 December 2019; Label: Polydor; Format: Digital download, streaming	7	—	187	92
"—" denotes a recording that did not chart or was not released in that territory.

=== Singles ===
==== As lead artist ====
Title	Year	Peak chart positions										Certifications	Album
Title	Year	UK	BEL (FL)	BEL (WA)	CZR	EUR	FRA	IRE	NLD	NZ Hot	SCO	Certifications	Album
"Daydreaming"	2016	—	—	—	—	—	—	—	—	—	—		The Milk & the Honey
"Milk & Honey"	2017	—	—	—	—	—	—	—	—	—	—		The Milk & the Honey
"Both Sides of the Moon (Live)" (with Gotts Street Park)	2018	—	—	—	—	—	—	—	—	—	—		Lately
"Lately" (with Gotts Street Park)	2018	— (Note: "Lately" did not enter the UK Singles Chart, but peaked at No. 53 on the UK Singles Sales Chart.)	—	—	—	—	128	—	—	—	—		Lately
"Father's Son"	2019	—	—	—	—	—	—	—	—	—	—		Lately
"Coco Blood"	2019	—	—	—	—	—	—	—	—	—	—		Non-album single
"Strange"	2019	82	47	— (Note: "Strange" did not enter the Wallonia Ultratop Top 50, but spent 2 weeks as an extra tip on the Ultratip chart.)	—	—	63	61	—	23	68	BPI: Gold; RMNZ: Gold; SNEP: Gold	Not Your Muse
"Stop This Flame"	2020	47	5	6	7	19	79	81	21	—	12	BPI: Gold; SNEP: Gold	Not Your Muse
"I Can See the Change"	2020	—	43	— (Note: "I Can See the Change" did not enter the Wallonia Ultratop Top 50, but spent 2 weeks as an extra tip on the Ultratip chart.)	—	—	—	—	— (Note: "I Can See the Change" did not enter the Dutch Top 40 but peaked at number 12 on the Dutch Tipparade Chart.)	—	—		Non-album singles
"Little Runaway"	2020	—	45	— (Note: "Little Runaway" did not enter the Wallonia Ultratop Top 50, but peaked at number 38 on the Ultratip chart.)	—	—	—	—	— (Note: "Little Runaway" did not enter the Dutch Top 40 but peaked at number 9 on the Dutch Tipparade Chart.)	—	—		Non-album singles
"Hear My Voice" (with Daniel Pemberton) (Note: "Hear My Voice" features on the soundtrack album The Trial of the Chicago 7 and also features on the deluxe edition of her debut studio album Not Your Muse.)	2020	— (Note: "Hear My Voice" did not enter the UK Singles Chart, but peaked at No. 57 on the UK Singles Sales Chart.)	— (Note: "Hear My Voice" did not enter the Flanders Ultratop Top 50, but spent 4 weeks as an extra tip on the Ultratip chart.)	—	—	—	—	—	—	—	—		The Trial of the Chicago 7
"A Little Love"	2020	59	— (Note: "A Little Love" did not enter the Flanders Ultratop Top 50, but spent 2 weeks as an extra tip on the Ultratip chart.)	—	—	11	—	—	—	—	—		Not Your Muse
"Love Is Back"	2020	— (Note: "Love Is Back" did not enter the UK Singles Chart, but peaked at No. 27 on the UK Singles Sales Chart.)	44	— (Note: "Love Is Back" did not enter the Wallonia Ultratop Top 50, but spent 2 weeks as an extra tip on the Ultratip chart.)	—	—	—	—	— (Note: "Love Is Back" did not enter the Dutch Top 40 but peaked at number 16 on the Dutch Tipparade Chart.)	—	—		Not Your Muse
"To Love a Man"	2022	—	—	—	—	—	—	—	—	—	—		Lately
"Anyone Can Be Santa"	2023	—	—	—	—	—	—	—	—	—	—		Non-album single
"There Will Come a Day"	2023	—	—	—	—	—	—	—	—	—	—		The Color Purple
"Blue Moon"	2024	—	—	—	—	—	—	—	—	—	—		This Town
"This Is Who I Am"	2024	— (Note: "This Is Who I Am" did not enter the UK Singles Chart, but peaked at No. 14 on the UK Singles Sales Chart.)	—	—	—	—	—	—	—	—	—		Woman of Faces
"Everyday"	2025	— (Note: "Everyday" did not enter the UK Singles Chart, but peaked at No. 65 on the UK Singles Sales Chart.)	—	—	—	—	—	—	—	—	—		Non-album single
"On With the Show"	2025	—	—	—	—	—	—	—	—	—	—		Woman of Faces
"Woman of Faces"	2025	—	—	—	—	—	—	—	—	—	—		Woman of Faces
"Time Will Tell"	2025	—	—	—	—	—	—	—	—	—	—		Woman of Faces
"People Always Change"	2025	—	—	—	—	—	—	—	—	—	—		Woman of Faces
"—" denotes a recording that did not chart or was not released in that territory.

==== As featured artist ====
Title	Year	Peak chart positions							Album
Title	Year	UK	UK Dance	IRE	SCO	SWE	NZ Hot	US Rock	Album
"Sing That Song" (Tieks featuring Celeste)	2014	90	18	—	90	—	—	—	Non-album single
"Touch Me" (Avicii featuring Celeste)	2015	—	37	—	—	69	—	—	Stories
"Times Like These" (as part of Live Lounge Allstars)	2020	1	—	64	1	—	5	12	Non-album single
"30,000 Feet" (Jeshi featuring Celeste)	2020	—	—	—	—	—	—	—	Bad Taste
"Ready For You" (Black Coffee featuring Celeste)	2020	—	—	—	—	—	—	—	Subconsciously
"It's All Right" (Jon Batiste featuring Celeste)	2020	—	—	—	—	—	—	—	Soul (Original Motion Picture Soundtrack)
"—" denotes a recording that did not chart or was not released in that territory.

=== Promotional singles ===
Title	Year	Album
"Not for Me"	2017	Non-album singles
"She's My Sunshine"	2019	Non-album singles
"La Vie en rose" (Note: "La vie en rose" was originally released as a standalone single, but was later included on the Japanese deluxe edition of Not Your Muse.)	2020	Not Your Muse
"I'm Here"	2020	Not Your Muse

=== Other charted songs ===
Title	Year	Peak chart positions	Album
Title	Year	BEL (FL) Tip	Album
"Tonight Tonight"	2021	1	Not Your Muse

=== Songwriting credits ===
Title	Year	Album
"All for You" (Wilkinson featuring Karen Harding)	2019	Non-album single
"Heat" (Paul Woolford with Amber Mark)	2021	Non-album single

=== Music videos ===
Title	Year	Director(s)	Ref.
"Daydreaming"	2016	Bafic	
"Lately" (featuring Gotts Street Park)	2019	Sam Hiscox	
"Father's Son"	2019	Bob Harlow	
"Coco Blood"	2019	Akinola Davids (a.k.a. Crack Stevens)	
"Strange (Live)"	2019	Colin Solal Cardo	
"You Do Something to Me" (with Paul Weller)	2019	Colin Solal Cardo	
"Strange (Edit)"	2019	Silent Tapes	
"Stop This Flame"	2020	Leonn Ward	
"I Can See the Change"	2020	Sophie Jones	
"Little Runaway"	2020	Sophie Jones	
"Hear My Voice"	2020	N/A	
"A Little Love"	2020	Silent Tapes	
"Love is Back"	2021	Sammy King	
"Tonight Tonight"	2021	Noah Lee	
"To Love a Man"	2022	Jesse Crankson	
"This Is Who I Am"	2024	Celeste	
"On With the Show"	2025	Rodrigo Inada	
"Woman of Faces"	2025	Jay Izard	
"Keep Smiling"	2025	Jay Izard	

== Filmography ==
=== Television ===
Year	Title	Role	Notes
2019	Inas Nacht	Herself	Episode: 2 November 2019
2019	Later... with Jools Holland	Herself	Episode: 24 October 2019
2019	C à vous	Herself	Episode: 11 December 2019
2019	Top of the Pops	Herself	Episode: 30 December 2019
2020	The Late Late Show with James Corden	Herself	Episode: 29 January 2020
2020	2020 Brit Awards	Herself	Winner and performer
2020	Lorraine	Herself	Episode: 19 February 2020
2020	The One Show	Herself	Episode: 28 February 2020
2020	The Graham Norton Show	Herself	Episode: 10 April 2020
2020	The Big Night In	Herself	Performer
2020	The Voice UK	Herself	Episode: 14 November 2020
2020	The 2020 Royal Variety Performance	Herself	Performer
2020	The One Show	Herself	Episode: 11 December 2020
2020	Top of the Pops	Herself	Episode: 30 December 2020
2020	Jools' Annual Hootenanny 2020/21	Herself	Performer
2021	The Graham Norton Show	Herself	Episode: 22 January 2021
2021	Sunday Brunch	Herself	Episode: 31 January 2021
2021	74th British Academy Film Awards	Herself	Performer

=== Film ===
Year	Title	Role	Notes
2023	If These Walls Could Sing	Herself	Documentary
2024	Blitz	Anita Sinclair	Directed by Steve McQueen

== Awards and nominations ==
Organization	Year	Category	Nominated work	Result	Ref.
Academy Awards	2021	Best Original Song	"Hear My Voice"	Nominated	
A&R Awards	2019	Vevo DSCVR Artist to Watch	Herself	Won	
Amazon Music	2019	Ones to Watch 2020	Herself	First	
BBC	2019	Introducing Artist of the Year	Herself	Won	
BBC	2019	Sound of 2020	Herself	Won	
BBC	2019	Hottest Record of the Year	"Strange"	Shortlisted	
BET Awards	2020	Best New International Act	Herself	Nominated	
BRIT Awards	2020	Rising Star	Herself	Won	
BRIT Awards	2021	Album of the Year	Not Your Muse	Nominated	
BRIT Awards	2021	Best Female Solo Artist	Herself	Nominated	
BRIT Awards	2021	Best New Artist	Herself	Nominated	
Ivor Novello Award	2021	Best Song Musically and Lyrically	"Stop this Flame"	Nominated	
Hollywood Music in Media Awards	2021	Best Original Song in a Feature Film	"Hear My Voice"	Nominated	
Golden Globe Awards	2021	Best Original Song	"Hear My Voice"	Nominated	
Jazz FM Awards	2020	Soul Act of the Year	Himself	Nominated	
Mercury Prize	2021	Album of the Year	Not Your Muse	Nominated	
MTV UK	2020	Push One to Watch	Herself	Nominated	
NME Awards	2020	Best New British Act	Herself	Nominated	
NME Awards	2020	Best New Act in the World	Herself	Nominated	
Reeperbahn Festival	2019	Anchor Award	Herself	Nominated	
Satellite Awards	2021	Best Original Song	"Hear My Voice"	Nominated	
UK Music Video Awards	2020	Best R&B/Soul Video – UK	"Stop This Flame"	Nominated	
UK Music Video Awards	2020	Best R&B/Soul Video – Newcomer	"30,000 Feet" (with Jeshi)	Nominated	
UK Music Video Awards	2021	Best R&B/Soul Video – UK	"Tonight, Tonight"	Won	
UK Music Video Awards	2021	Best Production Design in a Video	"Tonight, Tonight"	Nominated	
UK Music Video Awards	2025	Best R&B/Soul/Jazz Video – UK	"On with the Show"	Pending	
UK Music Video Awards	2025	Best R&B/Soul/Jazz Video – UK	"This is Who I Am"	Pending	
Berlin Music Video Awards	2022	Best Performer	"Le Coeur Noiu Charbon"	Nominated	
