= List of songs recorded by Nick Jonas =

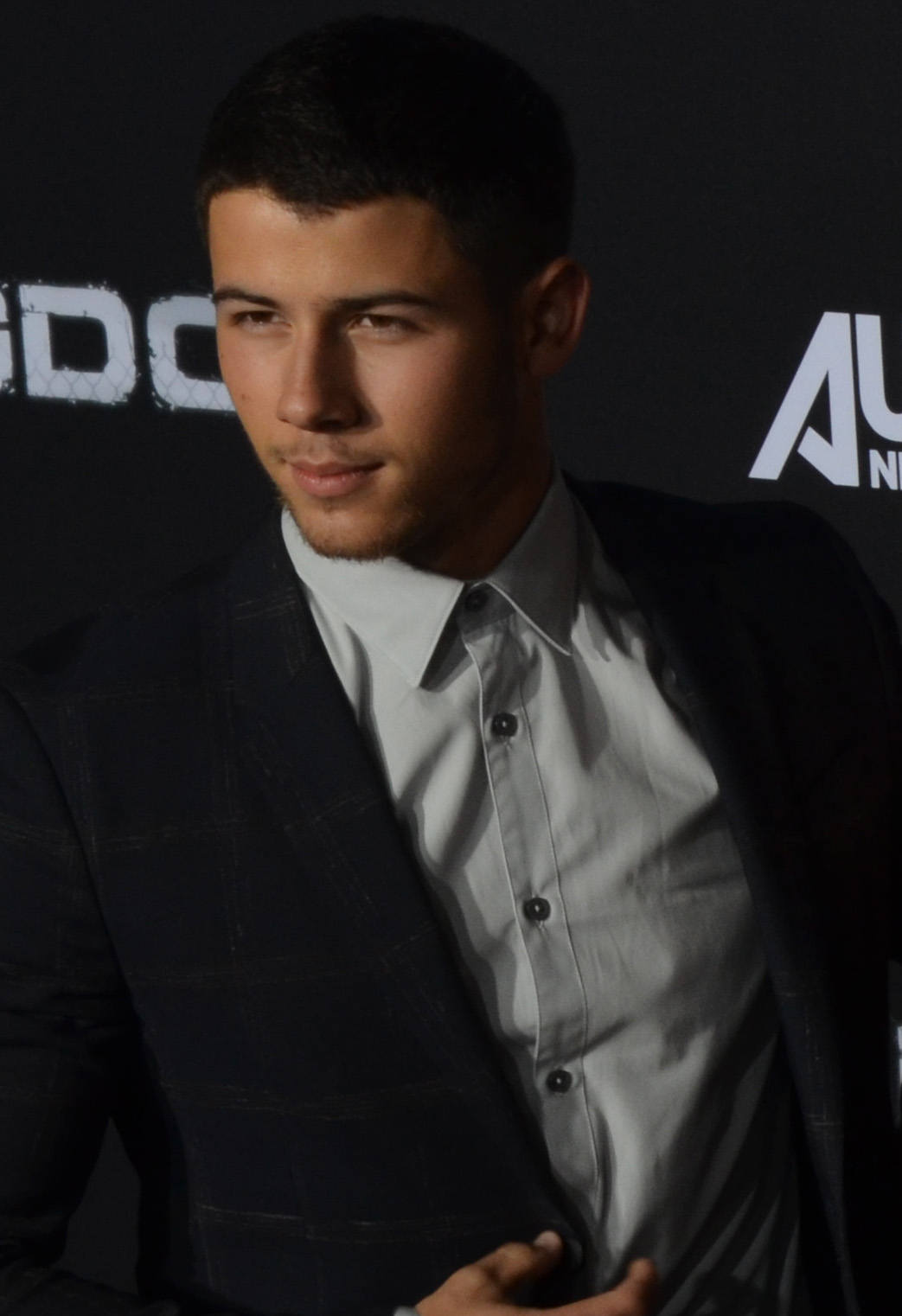
Nick Jonas in 2014

American recording artist, writer and musician Nick Jonas has recorded material for five studio albums (including one with The Administration), one extended play, multiple soundtrack albums, multiple remixes, two charity singles, three covers and he has also collaborated with several other artists on songs for their albums. In 2008 and again in 2009 he recorded a solo song which appeared on two different Jonas Brothers albums. In 2017 he added his first two original written and recorded songs for a movie.

== Songs ==
Released songs recorded by Nick Jonas (The writer(s) of each song can be viewed by selecting "show")
Song	Other performer(s)	Writer(s)	Originating album	Year	Ref.
"2Drunk"	—N/a	Nick Jonas; Greg Kurstin; Maureen "Mozella" McDonald	Spaceman	2021	
"A Little Bit Longer (Note: Despite being on a Jonas Brother album Nick recorded the song for the album without his brothers.)"	—N/a	Nick Jonas	A Little Bit Longer	2008	
"Anywhere"	Mustard	Nick Jonas; Anderson Paak; Salva; Americo Garcia; Jorge Medina; Mustard	—N/a	2018	
"Appreciate"	—N/a	James Bourne; Savan Kotecha; Jake Schulze	Nicholas Jonas	2004	
"Area Code"	—N/a	Nick Jonas; Nolan Lambroza; Simon Wilcox; Julia Michaels; Sean Douglas; Ian Kirkpatrick	Nick Jonas X2	2015	
"Avalanche"	Demi Lovato	T.J. Routon; Joseph Kirkland; Jason Dean; Michel Heyaca; Nick Jonas	Nick Jonas	2014	
"Bacon"	Ty Dolla $ign	Nick Jonas; Nolan Lambroza; Priscilla Renea; Tyrone Griffin, Jr.	Last Year Was Complicated	2016	
"Believe"	—N/a	Gary Barlow; Eliot Kennedy	Finding Neverland	2015	
"Black Keys"	Jonas Brothers	Nick Jonas	Lines, Vines and Trying Times	2009	
"Best of You (The Voice Performance)"	Rachel Mac	Dave Grohl; Taylor Hawkins; Nate Mendel; Chris Shiflett	—N/a	2021	
"Black Keys / A Little Bit Longer"	The Administration	Nick Jonas (Note: Both songs are written by Nick Jonas.)	Nick Jonas & The Administration Live at the Wiltern January 28th, 2010	2010	
"Bom Bidi Bom"	Nicki Minaj	Jason Evigan; Breyan Isaac; Henry Walter; Marcel Botezan; Sebastian Barac; Onika Maraj	Fifty Shades Darker: Original Motion Picture Soundtrack	2017	
"Brotherhood of Man"	Rob Bartlett; Ellen Harvey	Frank Loesser	Songs from How to Succeed in Business Without Really Trying	2012	
"Chains (Remix)"	Jhené Aiko	Jhené Aiko; Jason Evigan; Ammar Malik; Daniel Parker; Brian Warfield; Mac Robinson	Nick Jonas X2	2015	
"Chains (A$AP Ferg Remix)"	A$AP Ferg	Jason Evigan; Ammar Malik; Daniel Parker	—N/a	2015	
"Chains (Stormzy Remix)"	Stormzy	Jason Evigan; Ammar Malik; Daniel Parker	—N/a	2015	
"Chains"	—N/a	Jason Evigan; Ammar Malik; Daniel Parker	Nick Jonas	2014	
"Chainsaw"	—N/a	Nick Jonas; Nolan Lambroza; Simon Wilcox; Julia Michaels; Sean Douglas	Last Year Was Complicated	2016	
"Champagne Problems"	—N/a	Nick Jonas; Jason Evigan; Sean Douglas; Jonathan Tucker; PJ Bianco	Last Year Was Complicated	2016	
"Close"	Tove Lo	Robin Fredriksson; Mattias Larsson; Julia Michaels; Justin Tranter; Tove Lo	Last Year Was Complicated	2016	
"Closer"	Mike Posner	Nick Jonas; Mike Posner; Nick Monson	Nick Jonas	2014	
"Comfortable"	—N/a	Nick Jonas; Jason Evigan	Last Year Was Complicated	2016	
"Company Way"	Rob Bartlett	Frank Loesser	Songs from How to Succeed in Business Without Really Trying	2012	
"Conspiracy Theory"	The Administration	Nick Jonas	Who I Am	2010	
"Couldn’t Be Better (Movie Version)"	Kelly Clarkson; UglyDolls Cast	Christopher Lennertz; Glenn Slater	UglyDolls (soundtrack)	2019	
"Crazy Kinda Crush on You"	—N/a	Nick Jonas; Carl Sturken; Evan Rogers	Nicholas Jonas	2004	
"Dangerous"	—N/a	Nick Jonas; Greg Kurstin; Maureen "Mozella" McDonald	Spaceman	2021	
"Dear God"	—N/a	Carl Sturken; Evan Rogers	Nicholas Jonas	2004	
"Death Do Us Part"	—N/a	Nick Jonas; Greg Kurstin; Maureen "Mozella" McDonald	Spaceman	2021	
"Deeper Love"	—N/a	Nick Jonas; Greg Kurstin; Maureen "Mozella" McDonald; Mick Jones	Spaceman	2021	
"Delicious"	—N/a	Nick Jonas; Greg Kurstin; Maureen "Mozella" McDonald	Spaceman	2021	
"Don't Give Up On Us"	—N/a	Nick Jonas; Greg Kurstin; Maureen "Mozella" McDonald	Spaceman	2021	
"Don't Make Me Choose"	—N/a	Nick Jonas; Nolan Lambroza; Simon Wilcox	Last Year Was Complicated	2016	
"Don't Walk Away"	—N/a	Nick Jonas; Erik White	Nicholas Jonas	2004	
"Empty Chairs at Empty Tables"	Alfie Boe	H. Kretzmer	Alfie Boe	2012	
"Find you"	—N/a	Nick Jonas; Simon Wilcox; Jakob Hazell; Svante Halldin	—N/a	2017	
"Find you (Remix)"	Karol G	Nick Jonas; Simon Wilcox; Jakob Hazell; Svante Halldin	—N/a	2017	
"Good Girls"	Big Sean	Nick Jonas; Jason Evigan; Sean Douglas; Sean Anderson	Last Year Was Complicated	2016	
"Good Thing"	Sage The Gemini	Dominic Wynn Woods; Peter Svensson; Ilya Salmanzadeh; Savan Kotecha	—N/a	2015	
"Haven't Met You Yet"	Smash cast	Michael Bublé; Alan Chang; Amy Foster-Gilles	The Music of Smash	2012	
"Heights"	—N/a	Nick Jonas; Greg Kurstin; Maureen "Mozella" McDonald	Spaceman	2021	
"Higher Love"	—N/a	Steve Winwood; Will Jennings	Nicholas Jonas	2004	
"How to Succeed"	—N/a	Frank Loesser	Songs from How to Succeed in Business Without Really Trying	2012	
"Home"	—N/a	Nick Jonas; Justin Tranter; Nick Monson	Ferdinand	2017	
"I Believe in You"	—N/a	Frank Loesser	Songs from How to Succeed in Business Without Really Trying	2012	
"If I Fall"	—N/a	Nick Jonas; Greg Kurstin; Maureen "Mozella" McDonald	Spaceman	2021	
"I Never Met a Wolf Who Didn't Love to Howl"	Smash cast	Marc Shaiman; Scott Wittman	Bombshell	2012	
"Inseparable (New Version)"	The Administration	Nick Jonas; Joe Jonas; Kevin Jonas; Joshua Miller	Nick Jonas & The Administration Live at the Wiltern January 28th, 2010	2010	
"In the End"	The Administration	Nick Jonas; Greg Garbowsky; P.J. Bianco	Who I Am	2010	
"Introducing Me"	—N/a	Jamie Houston	Camp Rock 2: The Final Jam	2010	
"I Want You"	—N/a	Erik Hassle; Taio Cruz; Nick Ruth	Nick Jonas	2014	
"I Will Be the Light"	—N/a	Nick Jonas; Joe Jonas; Kevin Jonas II	Nicholas Jonas	2004	
"Jealous (B.o.B. Remix)"	B.o.B	Nick Jonas; Simon Wilcox; Nolan Lambroza; Bobby Ray Simmons, Jr.	—N/a	2014	
"Jealous (Tinashe Remix)"	Tinashe	Nick Jonas; Simon Wilcox; Nolan Lambroza	Nick Jonas X2	2014	
"Jealous"	—N/a	Nick Jonas; Simon Wilcox; Nolan Lambroza	Nick Jonas	2014	
"Joy to the World (A Christmas Prayer)"	—N/a	Nick Jonas; Kevin Jonas Sr.	Nicholas Jonas	2004	
"King (Live from BBC Radio 1's Live Lounge 2015)"	—N/a	Michael Thomas Goldsworthy; Mark Ralph Andrew Smith; Oliver Alexander Thornton; Resul Emre Turkmen	BBC Radio 1's Live Lounge 2015	2015	
"Last Time Around"	The Administration	Nick Jonas; Greg Garbowsky; P.J. Bianco	Who I Am	2010	
"Levels"	—N/a	Sean Douglas; Stefan Johnson; Marcus Lomax; Ian Kirkpatrick; Sam Martin; Talay Riley; Jordan Johnson	Nick Jonas X2	2015	
"Lush Life (Live from BBC Radio 1's Live Lounge 2016)"	—N/a	Emanuel Abrahamsson; Marcus Sepehrmanesh; Linnea Södahl; Fridolin Walcher; Christoph Bauss; Iman Conta Hultén	BBC Radio 1's Live Lounge 2016	2016	
"Maan Meri Jaan (Afterlife)"	King	Nick Jonas; King; David Arkwright; Miranda Glory; Natania Lalwani; Paris Carney	—N/a	2023	
"Nervous"	—N/a	Nick Jonas; Greg Kurstin; Maureen "Mozella" McDonald	Spaceman	2021	
"Nothing Would Be Better"	—N/a	Nick Jonas; Ian Kirkpatrick; Sean Douglas	Nick Jonas	2014	
"Numb"	Angel Haze	Nick Jonas; Nick Monson; Mike Posner; Raykeea Wilson	Nick Jonas	2014	
"Olive & an Arrow"	The Administration	Nick Jonas	Who I Am	2010	
"Only One (Nick Jonas Version)"	—N/a	Kanye West; Paul McCartney; Kirby Lauryen; Mike Dean; Noah Goldstein; Donda West	—N/a	2015	
"Party For Two (Live From Stagecoach, 2017)"	Shania Twain	Shania Twain; Robert John "Mutt" Lange	Come On Over (Special Edition)	2022	
"Please Be Mine"	—N/a	Nick Jonas; Joe Jonas; Kevin Jonas II	Nicholas Jonas	2004	
"Push"	—N/a	Nick Jonas; Chase Foster; Daniella Mason; Christopher Young; Paul "Phamous" Shelton	Nick Jonas	2014	
"Remember I Told You"	Anne-Marie; Mike Posner	Nick Jonas; Mike Posner	—N/a	2017	
"Right Now"	Robin Schulz	Nick Jonas; Skylar Grey; Peter Hanna; Andrew McMahon; Taylor Bird; Steve Mac; Junkx; Lindsey Stirling	—N/a	2018	
"Rose Garden"	The Administration	Nick Jonas	Who I Am	2010	
"Rosemary"	Rose Hemingway	Frank Loesser	Songs from How to Succeed in Business Without Really Trying	2012	
"Santa Barbara"	—N/a	Nick Jonas; Paul "Phamous" Shelton	Nick Jonas	2014	
"Say All You Want For Christmas"	Shania Twain	Nick Jonas; John Blackington; John Fields; Jordan Johnson; Stefan Johnson; Marcus Lomax	This Is Christmas	2017	
"Selfish"	Jonas Brothers	Nick Jonas; Kevin Jonas; Jason Evigan; Jordan Johnson; Marcus Lomax; Ryan Tedder; Stefan Johnson	Spaceman	2021	
"Sexual"	—N/a	Nick Jonas; Greg Kurstin; Maureen "Mozella" McDonald	Spaceman	2021	
"Spaceman"	—N/a	Nick Jonas; Greg Kurstin; Maureen "Mozella" McDonald	Spaceman	2021	
"State of Emergency"	The Administration	Nick Jonas; John Fields	Who I Am	2010	
"Stay"	The Administration	Nick Jonas	Nick Jonas & The Administration Live at the Wiltern January 28th, 2010	2010	
"Stronger (Back on the Ground)"	The Administration	Nick Jonas; Leeland Mooring; Jack Mooring	Who I Am	2010	
"Sunday Morning"	Kevin Hart	Nick Jonas; Nolan Lambroza; Dewain Whitmore; Simon Wilcox	What Now? (The Mixtape Presents Chocolate Droppa)	2016	
"Take Over"	—N/a	Jason Evigan; Daniel Omelio; John Ryan	Nick Jonas	2014	
"Teacher"	—N/a	Jason Evigan; Ammar Malik; Daniel Parker	Nick Jonas	2014	
"Testify"	—N/a	Nick Jonas; Hayden Chapman; Dewain Whitmore, Jr. J Que Smith	Last Year Was Complicated	2016	
"That's What They All Say"	—N/a	Nick Jonas; Paul "Phamous" Shelton; Magnus "Magnify" Martinsen; Petter Walther Walthinsen; Alexander Pavlich	Last Year Was Complicated	2016	
"The Big Finale"	UglyDolls Cast	Christopher Lennertz; Glenn Slater	UglyDolls (soundtrack)	2019	
"The Difference"	—N/a	Nick Jonas; Dewain Whitmore, Jr. Jason Evigan	Last Year Was Complicated	2016	
"The Ugly Truth"	—N/a	Christopher Lennertz; Glenn Slater	UglyDolls (soundtrack)	2019	
"The Uglier Truth"	—N/a	Christopher Lennertz; Glenn Slater	UglyDolls (soundtrack)	2019	
"This Is Heaven"	—N/a	Nick Jonas; Greg Kurstin; Maureen "Mozella" McDonald	Spaceman	2021	
"This Is Our Song"	Demi Lovato; Joe Jonas; Alyson Stoner	Adam Watts; Andy Dodd	Camp Rock 2: The Final Jam	2010	
"Time for Me to Fly"	—N/a	Nick Jonas; Joe Jonas; Kevin Jonas II; Kevin Jonas Sr. P.J. Bianco	Nicholas Jonas	2004	
"Today’s the (Perfect) Day""	UglyDolls Cast	Christopher Lennertz; Glenn Slater	UglyDolls (soundtrack)	2019	
"Tonight"	The Administration	Nick Jonas; Joe Jonas; Kevin Jonas II; Greg Garbowsky	Who I Am	2010	
"Touch"	—N/a	Nick Jonas; Robin Fredriksson; Mattias Larsson; Priscilla Renea; Brett James	Last Year Was Complicated	2016	
"Under You"	—N/a	Bebe Rexha; Savan Kotecha; Max Martin; Ali Payami; Rickard Göransson	Last Year Was Complicated	2016	
"Unhinged"	—N/a	Nick Jonas; Nolan Lambroza; Ilsey Juber	Last Year Was Complicated	2016	
"Until We Meet Again"	—N/a	Nick Jonas; Chase Foster	—N/a	2020	
"Vesper's Goodbye"	The Administration	Nick Jonas; P.J. Bianco	Who I Am	2010	
"Voodoo"	—N/a	Nick Jonas; Jason Evigan; Dewain Whitmore, Jr	Last Year Was Complicated	2016	
"Warning"	—N/a	Bjørn Erik Pedersen; Sebastian Teigen; Joseph Gil	Nick Jonas	2014	
"Watch Me"	—N/a	Nick Jonas; PJ Bianco; Jason Evigan; Sean Douglas; Jonathan Tucker	Ferdinand	2017	
"We Are the World 25 for Haiti"	Artists for Haiti	Michael Jackson; Lionel Richie	—N/a	2010	
"What We Came Here For"	Demi Lovato; Joe Jonas; Alyson Stoner; Anna Maria Perez de Taglé	Jamie Houston	Camp Rock 2: The Final Jam	2010	
"When You Look Me in the Eyes"	—N/a	Nick Jonas; Joe Jonas; Kevin Jonas II; Kevin Jonas Sr. P.J. Bianco; Raymond Boyd	Nicholas Jonas	2004	
"When We Get Home"	Daniella Mason	Nick Jonas; Daniella Mason; Chris Young	Last Year Was Complicated	2016	
"While the World is Spinning"	The Administration	Nick Jonas	Nick Jonas & The Administration Live at the Wiltern January 28th, 2010	2010	
"Who I Am"	The Administration	Nick Jonas	Who I Am	2010	
"Wilderness"	—N/a	Ian Kirkpatrick; Sam Martin; Sean Douglas	Nick Jonas	2014	
"Wrong Again"	—N/a	Nick Jonas; Joe Jonas; Kevin Jonas II	Nicholas Jonas	2004	
"You'll Be in My Heart (The Voice Performance)"	Thunderstorm Artis	Phil Collins	—N/a	2020	

== Unreleased songs ==
Unreleased songs recorded by Nick Jonas (The writer(s) of each song can be viewed by selecting "show")
Song	Other performer(s)	Writer(s)	Originating album	Year	Ref.
"24th Hour"	—N/a	—N/a	—N/a	2016	
"365"	—N/a	Nick Jonas; Felix Snow; Justin Tranter	—N/a	2016	
"Afterglow"	Demi Lovato	—N/a	Last Year Was Complicated	2014	
"Back To The Start"	—N/a	Nick Jonas; Frederick Odesjo; Rai Thistlethwayte	—N/a	2018	
"Bad Guy"	—N/a	Nick Jonas; Sean Douglas; Oscar Goerres; Oscar Holter	—N/a	2018	
"Bang"	—N/a	Nick Jonas; PJ Bianco; Abram Lunsford	—N/a	2018	
"Break The Silence"	—N/a	Nick Jonas	—N/a	2013	
"Collide"	—N/a	—N/a	—N/a	2011	
"Flawless"	—N/a	—N/a	—N/a	2019	
"Friendship Type"	—N/a	Nick Jonas; Simon Wilcox; Gustav Hazell; Savante Halldin	—N/a	2018	
"Fire And Rain"	—N/a	Nick Jonas; Thomas Rhett; Sean Douglas; Joe London	—N/a	2018	
"Get Started Early"	—N/a	—N/a	—N/a	2019	
"Hold On To Me"	—N/a	Nick Jonas; Simon Wilcox; Gustav Hazell; Savante Halldin	—N/a	2018	
"I Do"	—N/a	Nick Jonas	—N/a	2010	
"In The Dark"	—N/a	Nick Jonas; Heather Bright; Arnthor Birgisson	—N/a	2018	
"Joyride"	—N/a	Nick Jonas; Julia Michaels; Ian Kirkpatrick; Nolan Lambroza	—N/a	2018	
"Jumanji Jumanji"	—N/a	Nick Jonas; Jack Black	—N/a	2018	
"Last Night"	—N/a	—N/a	—N/a	2019	
"Let You Go"	—N/a	Nick Jonas; Andreas Levander; Lee McCutcheon	—N/a	2018	
"London Foolishly"	—N/a	Nick Jonas	—N/a	2010	
"Love Hurts"	—N/a	—N/a	—N/a	2019	
"Miss Me"	—N/a	Nick Jonas; Simon Wilcox; Gustav Hazell; Savante Halldin	—N/a	2018	
"No Apologies"	—N/a	Nick Jonas; Jason Evigan; Jessica Karpov	—N/a	2018	
"Oval Office"	The Administration	Nick Jonas	Who I Am	2010	
"Off The Chain"	—N/a	Nick Jonas	—N/a	2007	
"Piece Of Heaven"	—N/a	Nick Jonas; Thomas Rhett; Julia Bunetta; Sean Douglas	—N/a	2018	
"Pressure"	—N/a	—N/a	—N/a	2019	
"Proud Of You"	—N/a	—N/a	—N/a	2019	
"Taking It Back"	—N/a	Nick Jonas; Mark Blackwell; Dionne Bromfield; Paddy Dalton	—N/a	2018	
"Two"	—N/a	—N/a	—N/a	2019	
"Without You"	—N/a	Nick Jonas; Jason Pennock; Stan Greene; K Buchannon	—N/a	2018	
"World War III (Note: Nick originally wrote the song World War III for the administration, but instead it was re-recorded and used on the Jonas Brothers album Lines, Vines and Trying Times.)"	The Administration	Nick Jonas	Who I Am	2010	
"Wrong"	—N/a	—N/a	—N/a	2019	
"You're The Reason"	—N/a	Nick Jonas; Evan Rogers; Carl Sturken	—N/a	2018	
"Young, Rich, And Beautiful"	—N/a	Nick Jonas; Jarret Jenkins; Jason Sellers	—N/a	2018	

== Demo songs ==
Unreleased songs recorded by Nick Jonas (The writer(s) of each song can be viewed by selecting "show")
Song	Other performer(s)	Writer(s)	Originating album	Year	Ref.
"Untitled (Demo) - Time (Work Tape)"	—N/a	—N/a	—N/a	2019	

== See also ==
- List of songs recorded by Jonas Brothers
