= 2011 Tour =

2011 concert tour by Nick Jonas & the Administration

- Continental tour by Nick Jonas & the Administration
- Official poster
- Location: South America
- Associated album: Who I Am
- Start date: September 21, 2011
- End date: October 8, 2011
- Legs: 1
- No. of shows: 11

Nick Jonas & the Administration concert chronology
- Who I Am Tour (2010); 2011 Tour (2011)

The 2011 Tour was the second and final headlining concert tour for American band Nick Jonas & the Administration, showcasing their debut album Who I Am. The tour took place in South America. This is his second tour as a solo artist, without his brothers Joe and Kevin: the Jonas Brothers. The tour kicked off on September 21 in Brazil and concluded on October 8, 2011.

On July 12, Jonas announced through Facebook the South America shows and two days later he announced the Chile concert date for October 4. On July 21 a concert was announced for Paraguay and the next day, a second concert date for Argentina.

On August 2, Jonas confirmed five concerts in Brazil and one in Venezuela. Three days later, an announcement from Nick through Facebook was made for the Uruguay concert. Nick announced on September 3, 2011, through Twitter that Ocean Grove would be going on tour with them. On September 6, a concert in Puerto Rico was announced, making his solo debut on the Island. He has performed before in Puerto Rico alongside his brothers three times.

On September 21, the first day of the tour, it was announced that Jonas' last concert date of the tour (San Juan, Puerto Rico on October 11) was cancelled. The producer of the Puerto Rico date, César Sainz, confirmed the information the same day. According to Jonas, the last show the tour conflicted with the start of his training for the role of J. Pierrepont Finch, which will replace Harry Potter actor Daniel Radcliffe and Glee's Darren Criss, in the revival of Broadway's How to Succeed in Business Without Really Trying will take place in Los Angeles starting on October 10. On September 23, just three days later after the announcement, the news was confirmed via Jonas' website. The day after, Jonas himself apologized for the cancellation of the show via Twitter.

== Web series ==
On December 13, 2011, a video of Nick performing "Last Time Around" was posted online as part of a new internet series Fandrop. The video shows some lucky fans watching Nick Jonas & the Administration rehearse for the Nick Jonas 2011 Tour. On December 14 a teaser for the next episode went online, showing Nick talking about "Conspiracy Theory". The second episode premiered on December 15, 2011.

On December 15 the second episode went online it shows the performance of "Conspiracy Theory" by Nick Jonas & the Administration. On December 16 a teaser for the next episode went online, showing Nick playing the intro of "Who I Am". This episode premiered on December 20, 2011. On December 20, the episode was online, it shows Nick performing "Who I Am". Alongside a teaser for episode 4 went online, showing Nick warming up his vocals for the last episode; which aired on December 22, 2011.

On December 22, the last episode aired, showing Nick Jonas & the Administration performing their version of the Jonas Brothers song "Inseparable".

== Opening act ==
- Ocean Grove served as opening act for selected dates of the tour.

== Setlist ==
São Paulo Setlist
1. Last Time Around
2. State of Emergency
3. Inseparable (NJATA version)
4. SOS (NJATA version)
5. Medley:
  1. Yellow (Coldplay Cover)
  2. A Little Bit Longer
6. Conspiracy Theory
7. Rose Garden
8. Gotta Find You (Camp Rock Cover)
9. Introducing Me (Camp Rock 2 Cover)
10. I Saw Her Standing There (Beatles Cover)
11. Medley:
  1. Just the Way You Are (Bruno Mars Cover)
  2. Just in Love (Joe Jonas Cover)
12. Medley:(with Ocean Grove)
  1. BB Good
  2. Still In Love With You
13. Collide (New Song)
14. Fly with Me
15. Lovebug
16. Stronger (Back On The Ground)
17. Stay
18. Who I Am
Rio de Janeiro Setlist
1. Last Time Around
2. State of Emergency
3. Inseparable (NJATA version)
4. SOS (NJATA version)
5. Medley:
  1. Yellow (Coldplay Cover)
  2. A Little Bit Longer
6. In The End
7. Conspiracy Theory
8. Rose Garden
9. Gotta Find You (Camp Rock cover)
10. Introducing Me (Camp Rock 2 cover)
11. Olive and An Arrow
12. I Saw Her Standing There (The Beatles cover)
13. Medley:
  1. Just In Love (Joe Jonas cover)
  2. Just The Way You Are (Bruno Mars cover)
14. Medley:(with Ocean Grove)
  1. Still In Love With You
  2. BB Good
15. Lovebug
16. Stronger (Back On The Ground)
17. Stay
18. Who I Am
Belo Horizonte Setlist
1. Last Time Around
2. State Of Emergency
3. Inseparable (NJATA version)
4. SOS (NJATA version)
5. Medley:
  1. A Little Bit Longer
  2. Yellow (Coldplay cover)
6. Conspiracy Theory
7. Rose Garden
8. Gotta Find You (Camp Rock Cover)
9. Introducing Me (Camp Rock 2 Cover)
10. Vesper's Goodbye
11. I Saw Her Standing There (The Beatles cover)
12. Medley:
  1. Someone like You (Adele cover)
  2. Just In Love (Joe Jonas cover)
  3. Just The Way You Are (Bruno Mars cover)
13. Medley: (With Ocean Grove)
  1. Still in love with you
  2. BB Good
14. Fly With Me
15. Lovebug
16. Stronger (Back On The Ground)
17. Stay
18. Who I Am
Curitiba Setlist
1. Last Time Around
2. State Of Emergency
3. Inseparable (NJATA version)
4. SOS (NJATA version)
5. Medley:
  1. A Little Bit Longer
  2. Yellow (Coldplay cover)
6. Conspiracy Theory
7. Rose Garden
8. Happy Birthday (Mildred J. Hill cover)(To Frankie Jonas)(Curitiba Only)
9. Gotta Find You (Camp Rock Cover)
10. Introducing Me (Camp Rock 2 Cover)
11. With You (New Song)
12. Vesper's Goodbye
13. I Saw Her Standing There (The Beatles cover)
14. Medley:
  1. Someone like You (Adele cover)
  2. Just In Love (Joe Jonas cover)
  3. Just The Way You Are (Bruno Mars cover)
15. Medley: (With Ocean Grove)
  1. Still in love with you
  2. BB Good
16. Fly With Me
17. Lovebug
18. Stronger (Back On The Ground)
19. Stay
20. Who I Am
Porto Alegre Setlist
1. Last Time Around
2. State Of Emergency
3. Inseparable (NJATA version)
4. SOS (NJATA version)
5. Medley:
  1. A Little Bit Longer
  2. Yellow (Coldplay cover)
6. Conspiracy Theory
7. Rose Garden
8. Gotta Find You (Camp Rock Cover)
9. Introducing Me (Camp Rock 2 Cover)
10. Vesper's Goodbye
11. I Saw Her Standing There (The Beatles cover)
12. Medley:
  1. Someone Like You (Adele cover)
  2. Just The Way You Are (Bruno Mars cover)
13. Medley: (With Ocean Grove)
  1. Still in love with you
  2. BB Good
14. Lovebug
15. Stronger (Back On The Ground)
16. Stay
17. Who I Am
Asunción Setlist
1. Last Time Around
2. State Of Emergency
3. Inseparable (NJATA version)
4. SOS (NJATA version)
5. Medley:
  1. A Little Bit Longer
  2. Yellow (Coldplay cover)
6. Conspiracy Theory
7. Rose Garden
8. Gotta Find You (Camp Rock Cover)
9. Introducing Me (Camp Rock 2 Cover)
10. Vesper's Goodbye
11. I Saw Her Standing There (The Beatles cover)
12. Medley:
  1. Someone Like You (Adele cover)
  2. The Edge Of Glory (Lady Gaga Cover)
  3. Just The Way You Are (Bruno Mars cover)
13. Medley: (With Ocean Grove)
  1. Still in love with you
  2. BB Good
14. When You Look Me In The Eyes
15. Lovebug
16. Stronger (Back On The Ground)
17. Stay
18. Who I Am
Buenos Aires Setlist
1. Last Time Around
2. State of Emergency
3. Inseparable (NJATA version)
4. SOS (NJATA version)
5. Medley:
  1. A Little Bit Longer
  2. Yellow (Coldplay cover)
6. Conspiracy Theory
7. Rose Garden
8. Gotta Find You (Camp Rock cover)
9. Introducing Me (Camp Rock 2 cover)
10. Vesper’s Goodbye
11. I Saw Her Standing There (The Beatles cover)
12. Medley:
  1. Someone Like You (Adele Cover)
  2. Just In Love (Joe Jonas cover)
  3. Just The Way You Are (Bruno Mars cover)
13. Medley: (With Ocean Grove)
  1. Still In Love With You
  2. BB Good
14. Lovebug
15. Stronger (Back On The Ground)
16. Stay
17. Who I Am
Córdoba Setlist
1. Last Time Around
2. State of Emergency
3. Inseparable (NJATA version)
4. SOS (NJATA version)
5. Medley:
  1. A Little Bit Longer
  2. Yellow (Coldplay cover)
6. Conspiracy Theory
7. Rose Garden
8. Gotta Find You (Camp Rock cover)
9. Introducing Me (Camp Rock 2 cover)
10. Vesper’s Goodbye
11. In The End
12. Medley:
  1. Just In Love (Joe Jonas cover)
  2. Just The Way You Are (Bruno Mars cover)
13. Medley: (With Ocean Grove)
  1. Still In Love With You
  2. BB Good
14. Lovebug
15. Stronger (Back On The Ground)
16. Stay
17. Who I Am
Santiago Setlist
1. Last Time Around
2. State of Emergency
3. Inseparable (NJATA version)
4. SOS (NJATA version)
5. Medley:
  1. A Little Bit Longer
  2. Yellow (Coldplay cover)
6. Conspiracy Theory
7. Rose Garden
8. Bring Him Home (Les Miserables cover)
9. Gotta Find You (Camp Rock cover)
10. Introducing Me (Camp Rock 2 cover)
11. Vesper’s Goodbye
12. I Saw Her Standing There (The Beatles cover)
13. Medley:
  1. Teenage Dream (Katy Perry cover)
  2. Someone Like You (Adele cover)
  3. Just In Love (Joe Jonas cover)
  4. The Edge of Glory (Lady Gaga cover)
  5. Just The Way You Are (Bruno Mars cover)
14. Medley: (With Ocean Grove)
  1. Play My Music (Camp Rock cover)
  2. BB Good
  3. Pushing Me Away
  4. Fly With Me
  5. Turn Right
  6. Your Biggest Fan (JONAS LA cover)
15. Lovebug
16. Stronger (Back On The Ground)
17. Stay
18. Who I Am
Montevideo Setlist
1. Last Time Around
2. State Of Emergency
3. Inseparable (NJATA version)
4. SOS (NJATA version)
5. Medley:
  1. A Little Bit Longer
  2. Yellow (Coldplay cover)
6. Conspiracy Theory
7. Rose Garden
8. Gotta Find You (Camp Rock cover)
9. Introducing Me (Camp Rock 2 cover)
10. Vesper's Goodbye
11. Bring Him Home (Les Miserables cover)
12. I Saw Her Standing There (The Beatles cover)
13. Medley:
  1. Just In Love (Joe Jonas cover)
  2. Someone Like You (Adele cover)
  3. Just The Way You Are (Bruno Mars cover)
14. Medley: (With Ocean Grove)
  1. BB Good
  2. Play My Music (Camp Rock cover)
  3. Paranoid
  4. Poison Ivy
  5. Just Friends
  6. Hollywood
  7. Goodnight & Goodbye
  8. LA Baby (Where Dreams Are Made Of) (JONAS LA cover)
15. Lovebug
16. Stronger (Back On The Ground)
17. Stay
18. Who I Am
Caracas Setlist
1. Last Time Around
2. State Of Emergency
3. Inseparable (NJATA version)
4. SOS (NJATA version)
5. Medley:
  1. A Little Bit Longer
  2. Yellow (Coldplay cover)
6. Conspiracy Theory
7. Rose Garden
8. Gotta Find You (Camp Rock cover)
9. Introducing Me (Camp Rock 2 cover)
10. Vesper's Goodbye
11. I Saw Her Standing There (The Beatles cover)
12. Medley:
  1. Someone Like You (Adele cover)
  2. Just In Love (Joe Jonas cover)
  3. Just The Way You Are (Bruno Mars cover)
13. Medley: (With Ocean Grove)
  1. Time For Me To Fly
  2. Play My Music (Camp Rock cover)
  3. Hello Beautiful
  4. World War III
  5. Just Friends
  6. Much Better
  7. When You Look Me In The Eyes
14. Fly With Me
15. Still In Love With You
16. Lovebug
17. Stronger (Back On The Ground)
18. Stay
19. Who I Am

=== Additional notes ===
- The October 11 show, scheduled for San Juan, Puerto Rico, was cancelled on the first day of the tour. It was not rescheduled.
- During the concerts, Ocean Grove joined Nick on stage during "Still In Love With You"/"BB Good".
- During the concert in São Paulo, Frankie Jonas joined Nick on stage.
- Nick didn't perform the new song "Collide" and "Fly With Me" during the concert in Rio de Janeiro; he played "In The End" and "Olive & An Arrow" instead.
- Nick performed "Vesper's Goodbye" in Belo Horizonte instead of "Collide" and "Someone Like You" (Adele cover) was added to the medley.
- During the concert in Curitiba, Frankie came on stage and Nick sang with the audience "Happy Birthday" to him. Also, Nick performed a new song called "With You" after "Introducing Me".
- "Just In Love", "Fly With Me" and "With You" weren't performed in Porto Alegre.
- In Asunción, Nick added "The Edge Of Glory" (Lady Gaga cover) and "When You Look Me In The Eyes" to the setlist. "Just In Love" (Joe Jonas cover) wasn't performed that evening.
- In Buenos Aires, "Just In Love" was performed again.
- In Córdoba, "In The End" was performed again, while "Someone Like You" (Adele Cover) and "I Saw Her Standing There" (The Beatles cover) weren't performed during the concert
- In Santiago, Nick added new songs to the setlist: "Bring Him Home" (Les Misérables cover), "Teenage Dream" (Katy Perry cover), "Play My Music" (Camp Rock cover), "Pushing Me Away", "Turn Right" and "Your Biggest Fan" (Jonas L.A. cover), "Edge Of Glory" (Lady Gaga cover), "Someone Like You" (Adele cover), "I Saw Her Standing There" (The Beatles cover) and "Fly With Me". "In The End" and "Still In Love With You" were not performed.
- "Paranoid", "Poison Ivy", "Just Friends", "Hollywood", "Goodnight & Goodbye" and "L.A. Baby (Where Dreams Are Made Of)" were added to the medley in the Montevideo setlist; "Teenage Dream" (Katy Perry cover) and "Edge Of Glory" (Lady Gaga cover) were removed from the setlist that evening.
- "Much Better", "Hello Beautiful", "World War III", "Play My Music", "Just Friends", "When You Look Me In The Eyes", "Time For Me To Fly", "Still In Love With You" were added to the Caracas setlist.

== Tour dates ==
Date	City	Country	Venue
South America
September 21, 2011	São Paulo	Brazil	Via Funchal
September 22, 2011	Rio de Janeiro	Brazil	Vivo Rio
September 23, 2011	Belo Horizonte	Brazil	Chevrolet Hall
September 25, 2011	Curitiba	Brazil	Theatro Positivo
September 27, 2011	Porto Alegre	Brazil	Pepsi On Stage
September 29, 2011	Asunción	Paraguay	Jockey Club Paraguayo
October 1, 2011	Buenos Aires	Argentina	Estadio G.E.B.A.
October 2, 2011	Córdoba	Argentina	Orfeo Superdomo
October 4, 2011	Santiago	Chile	Movistar Arena
October 6, 2011	Montevideo	Uruguay	Velódromo Municipal
October 8, 2011	Caracas	Venezuela	Terraza del C.C.C.T.

Cancellations and rescheduled shows

Date	City	Country	Venue	Status
October 11, 2011	San Juan	Puerto Rico	Coliseo de Puerto Rico, José Miguel Agrelot	Cancelled
