= Who I Am =

Who I Am may refer to:

== Albums ==
- Who I AM (Abraham Mateo album) or the title song, 2014
- Who I Am (Alan Jackson album) or the title song, 1994
- Who I Am (Amy Pearson album), 2008
- Who I Am (Beverley Knight album) or the title song, 2002
- Who I Am (Cory Marks album) or the title song, 2020
- Who I Am (David Ruffin album) or the title song, 1975
- Who I Am (Jason Castro album), 2010
- Who I Am (Jessica Andrews album) or the title song (see below), 2001
- Who I Am (Nick Jonas & the Administration album) or the title song (see below), 2010
- Who I Am, by Alice Peacock, 2006
- Who I Am, by Gary Wright, 1988
- Who I Am, by Lisa McHugh, 2017
- Who I Am (EP), by Blanca, or the title song, 2015

== Songs ==
- "Who I Am" (Alan Walker song), 2024
- "Who I Am" (Blog 27 song), 2006
- "Who I Am" (Jessica Andrews song), 2000
- "Who I Am" (Lena Katina song), 2014
- "Who I Am" (Nick Jonas & the Administration song), 2009
- "Who I Am" (Shannon Noll song), 2016
- "Who I Am", by After Forever from After Forever, 2007
- "Who I Am", by Anne-Marie from Therapy, 2021
- "Who I Am", by Ashley Tisdale from Headstrong, 2007
- "Who I Am", by Brandy from Afrodisiac, 2004
- "Who I Am", by Code Orange from Underneath, 2020
- "Who I Am", by David Archuleta from The Other Side of Down, 2010
- "Who I Am", by Lil Xan from Total Xanarchy, 2018
- "Who I Am", by Magna-Fi from VerseChorusKillMe, 2007
- "Who I Am", by Maroon 5 from Red Pill Blues, 2017
- "Who I Am", by Melanie C from Melanie C, 2020
- "Who I Am", by Memphis May Fire from Broken, 2018
- "Who I Am", by Miwa, 2020
- "Who I Am", by Natasha Bedingfield from the film The Pirate Fairy, 2014
- "Who I Am", by Notaker from Genesis, 2017
- "Who I Am", by Pusha T from My Name Is My Name, 2013
- "Who I Am", by Rebecka Karlsson, 2019
- "Who I Am", by Sandra from Back to Life, 2009
- "Who I Am", by Shawn Mendes from Shawn, 2024
- "Who I Am", by Wage War from Pressure, 2019
- "Who I Am", from the Bratz Rock Angelz soundtrack, 2005

== Other uses ==
- Who I Am Tour, a 2010 concert tour by Nick Jonas & the Administration
- Who I Am (book), a 2012 memoir by Pete Townshend
- Who I am: My Story, a 2022 memoir by Melanie C
