= Black on Black (disambiguation) =

Black on Black is a 1982 album by Waylon Jennings.

Black on Black may also refer to:

- Black on Black!, a 1970 album by Sonny Phillips
- Black on Black: A Tribute to Black Flag, a 2002 tribute album to Black Flag
- "Back on Black II", a track on Heart's 1993 album, Desire Walks On
- "SUVs (Black on Black)", a single by Pooh Shiest and Jack Harlow
- Black on Black (TV series), a British television program

== See also ==
- Back in Black (disambiguation)
- Back to Black (disambiguation)
