= Catchpenny =

American rock/pop band

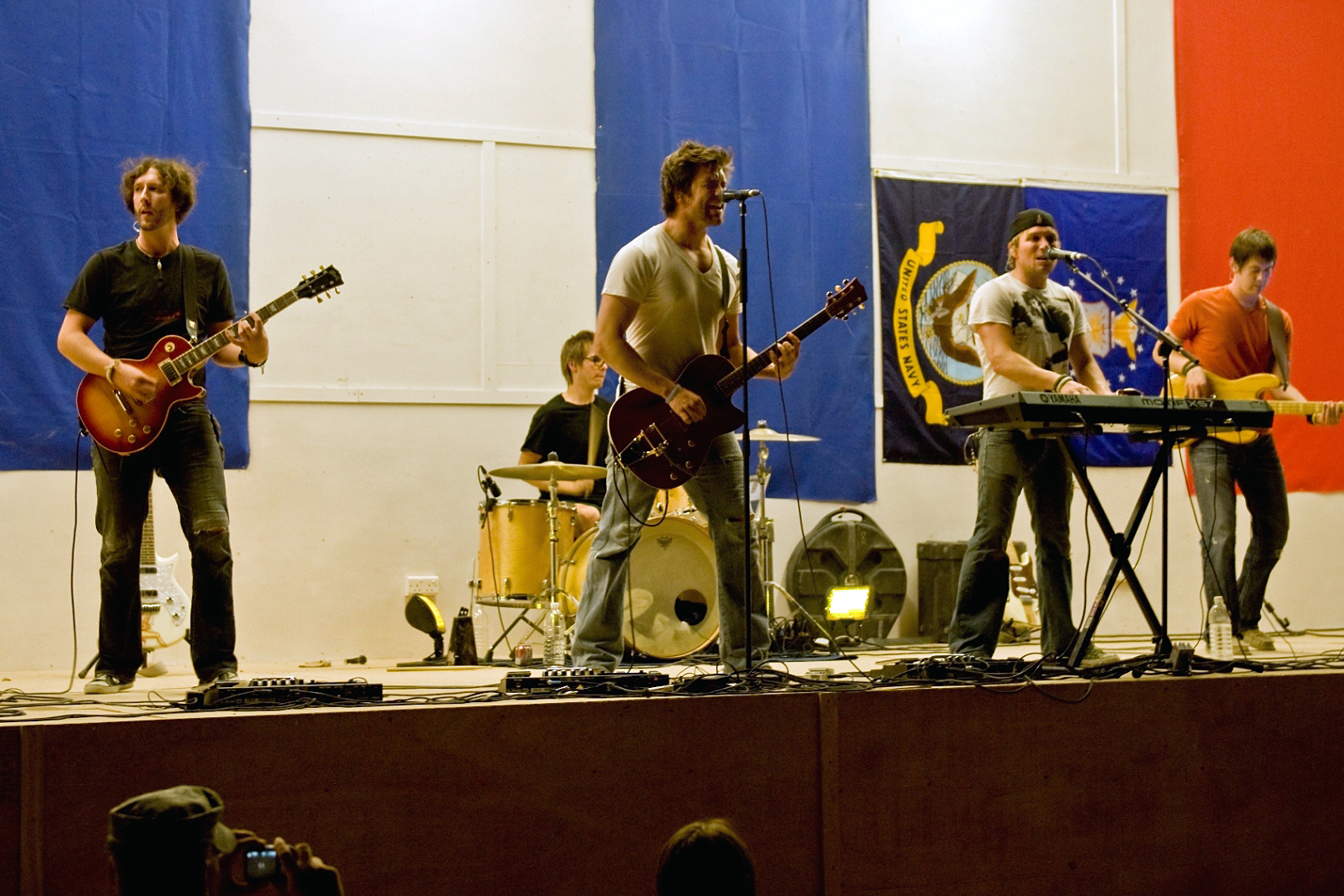
- Catchpenny performing during a 2009 Memorial Day celebration at Contingency Operating Base, Basra, Iraq

Background information
- Origin: Minnesota, USA
- Genres: Rock
- Years active: 2003–2011
- Past members: Christian Schauf; Zachary Schauf; Eric Raum; Ben Foote; Billy Thommes; Jeff Wick; Josh Anderson; Josh Fink; Jent Lepalm; Layne Christopher

Catchpenny was an American rock/pop band. Tommy Stinson, Michael Bland, Phil Solem, Tommy Barbarella, John Fields, and Jim Anton also worked with Catchpenny.

The band set record attendance numbers at Hard Rock Cafe in Minneapolis, was featured on national television spots for ESPN and Arizona Jean Company, and sold more than 4,000 copies of Chance for a Lifetime in its first year after release.

Their first album, Chance for a Lifetime, produced by Michael Bland, was recorded in eight days and released in December 2005. Following the release and the band's increase in exposure, Catchpenny opened for multiple artists.

Catchpenny performed for marines, soldiers, sailors, and airmen as part of their overseas tour during the summer of 2008. They performed at Al Taqaddum Air Base, Iraq on August 9, 2008, and at Ali Air Base/COB ADDER, Iraq on November 19, 2008. They returned to Iraq on April 8, 2009, to Joint Base Balad as part of their second tour entertaining troops.

== Discography ==
Albums

- Chance for a Lifetime (2005)
- From Where You Are (2008)
