= Last Time Around (song) =

Song by Nick Jonas & the Administration

from the album Who I Am
- Released: 2 February 2010
- Recorded: 2009; Blackbird Studio's, Nashville, Tennessee
- Genre: Country rock
- Length: 4:07 (Album Version)
- Label: Jonas, Hollywood Records
- Songwriters: Nick Jonas, Greg Garbowsky, P.J. Bianco
- Producer: John Fields

"Last Time Around" was one of the songs of which a preview was leaked online before the album release on February 2, 2010.

== Background and composition ==
"Last Time Around"
A 24 second sample of "Last Time Around" by Nick Jonas & the Administration, where a portion of the chorus is heard.

According to M Magazine Selena Gomez was the inspiration for the song.

Nick played another new song, Last Time Around for M, and it was clear that Selena was the inspiration once again. "Don’t forget the fun we had last summer, when the grass was greener and your hair was longer," he sang.

According to Popstar magazine the song is about Selena Gomez or Miley Cyrus. Nick told Popstar magazine:

On his song Last Time Around: "Well, the story in the song is you show up in this place and you see someone who's kind of changed their look. And they've changed everything about themselves, whether it's because they've become more confident or they've come into their own, whatever it is. And you see them and introduce yourself and don't realize that you've already met them. It's like, let's get back to that. Let's get back to that moment where 'you hair was long and the grass was greener'".

On May 11, 2010, the song was used on the live album: Nick Jonas & The Administration Live at the Wiltern January 28th, 2010.

== Versions ==
- "Last Time Around" (Album Version) - 4:07
- "Last Time Around" (Live) - 7:16
- "Last Time Around" (Video Version) - 4:27

== Music video ==
On the Limited Edition DVD there was a video of Nick Jonas & The Administration (shot in black & white) performing the song.

== Live performances ==
Nick Jonas performed the song live for the first time on January 2 during the Who I Am Tour with the Administration. Nick performed with Sonny Thompson acoustic versions of the songs "Last Time Around", "Who I Am", "Tonight" during Radio Disney Total Access;

On September 18, 2010, Nick performed two songs: "Who I Am" and "Last Time Around" during a concert in Mountain View, CA as part of the Jonas Brothers Live In Concert.

On February 23, 2011, Nick performed the song during an acoustic set, accompanied by Jonas Brothers guitarist John Taylor. He performed an acoustic version the song on August 6, during the promotion of the Quaker Chewy Live Launch

Along With Sonny Thompson Nick performed at the Military Event in Columbus, Ohio on April 14, 2011. He played the songs Last Time Around and Who I Am.

They opened their performance with the song on July 16, during the Ottawa Blues fest. On August 13, 2011, he performed the song at Musikfest. The song was also performed during the concerts in South America as part of the Nick Jonas 2011 Tour.

On December 13, 2011, a video of Nick performing Last Time Around was posted online as part of a new internet serie Fandrop. The video shows some lucky fans seeing Nick Jonas & the administration rehearse for the Nick jonas 2011 Tour.

On May 20, 2012, Nick performed an acoustic version of the song in between two shows of How to Succeed in Business Without Really Trying.

The song was performed during all of the Jonas Brothers World Tour 2012/2013. It was also performed during the 2013 National School Choice Week's official Kickoff Celebration in Phoenix, Arizona. They performed the song again on June 1 during the Acapulco Festival in Mexico. The song "Last Time Around" was performed again during the Jonas Brothers Live Tour.

== Personnel ==
- Nick Jonas - Lead Vocals, Lead Guitar, Composer
- Tommy Barbarella - Keyboards
- Michael Bland - Drums, Vibraphone, Vocals
- Sonny Thompson -Guitars, Vocals (on DVD Who I Am, and live performances)
- John Fields - Bass, Guitars, Percussion, Vibraphone, Producer
- David Ryan Harris - Guitars, Vocals (on CD Who I Am)
- Greg Garbowsky - Composer
- P.J Bianco - Composer
- Dave McNair - Mastering
- Jon Lind - A&R
- David Snow - Creative Director
- Paul David Hager - Mixing
- Philip McIntyre - Management
- Johnny Wright - Management
- Kevin Jonas SR. - Management

== Release history ==
Region	Date	Format	Label
Germany	January 29, 2010	Digital download	Hollywood Records
United States	February 2, 2010	Digital download	Hollywood Records
