= 2010 Teen Choice Awards =

August 2010 entertainment award ceremony

- Date: August 8, 2010 (ceremony); August 9, 2010 (aired)
- Location: Gibson Amphitheatre, Universal City, California
- Hosted by: Katy Perry, Cory Monteith, Chris Colfer, Kevin McHale, and Mark Salling

Television/radio coverage
- Network: Fox

The 2010 Teen Choice Awards ceremony was held on August 8, 2010, at the Gibson Amphitheatre, Universal City, California. Several new categories were introduced, separated into "Movie", "TV", "Music", "Summer", "Fashion" and "Other". The ceremony aired on August 9, 2010, on Fox, and was co-hosted by Katy Perry, who also performed, and Cory Monteith, Chris Colfer, Kevin McHale, and Mark Salling from Glee. Alongside Katy, performers included Jason Derulo, Travie McCoy, Justin Bieber and Diddy – Dirty Money.

== Presenters ==
The following celebrities either presented awards and/or performed at the ceremony:

- Lea Michele
- David Archuleta
- Kristen Bell
- Big Time Rush
- Sandra Bullock
- John Cena
- Miranda Cosgrove
- Joshua Jackson
- Hilary Duff
- Zac Efron
- Ashley Greene
- Victoria Justice
- Kelly Ripa
- Khloé Kardashian
- Kim Kardashian
- Kourtney Kardashian
- Zachary Levi
- George Lopez (as "Kougar Kardashian")
- Justin Long
- LL Cool J
- Julianne Hough
- Leighton Meester
- William Moseley
- Shaquille O'Neal
- Jim Parsons
- Ryan Sheckler
- Yvonne Strahovski
- Shailene Woodley
- Cat Deeley
- Stephen "tWitch" Boss
- Chris Daughtry
- Ken Jeong

== Performers ==
listed in order of appearance

- A-Trak (DJ host)
- Katy Perry – "Teenage Dream"
- Jason Derulo – "Whatcha Say" (intro) and "In My Head"
- Travie McCoy featuring Bruno Mars – "Billionaire"
- Justin Bieber – "U Smile"
- Diddy – Dirty Money – "Hello Good Morning"

(Bieber's appearance was a pre-recorded performance at his Phoenix, Arizona, tour date.)

== Winners and nominees ==
Nominees were announced in two waves. Over 85 million votes were cast to determine winners. Winners are highlighted in bold text.

=== Movies ===
Choice Movie: Action	Choice Movie Actor: Action
G.I. Joe: The Rise of Cobra; Kick-Ass; The Losers; Robin Hood; **Sherlock Holmes**	Nicolas Cage – Kick-Ass; Russell Crowe – Robin Hood; Matt Damon – Green Zone; Robert Downey Jr. – Sherlock Holmes; **Channing Tatum – G.I. Joe: The Rise of Cobra**
Choice Movie Actress: Action	Choice Movie: Sci-Fi
Cate Blanchett – Robin Hood; Mila Kunis – The Book of Eli; **Rachel McAdams – Sherlock Holmes**; Sienna Miller – G.I. Joe: The Rise of Cobra; Zoe Saldaña – The Losers	2012; **Avatar**; District 9; Iron Man 2; The Time Traveler's Wife
Choice Movie Actor: Sci-Fi	Choice Movie Actress: Sci-Fi
Sharlto Copley – District 9; John Cusack – 2012; Robert Downey Jr. – Iron Man 2; Jude Law – Repo Men; **Sam Worthington – Avatar**	Scarlett Johansson – Iron Man 2; Rachel McAdams – The Time Traveler's Wife; Gwyneth Paltrow – Iron Man 2; Amanda Peet – 2012; **Zoe Saldaña – Avatar**
Choice Movie: Fantasy	Choice Movie Actor: Fantasy
Alice in Wonderland; Clash of the Titans; Harry Potter and the Half-Blood Prince; Prince of Persia: The Sands of Time; **The Twilight Saga: New Moon**	Johnny Depp – Alice in Wonderland; Jake Gyllenhaal – Prince of Persia: The Sands of Time; **Taylor Lautner – The Twilight Saga: New Moon**; Robert Pattinson – The Twilight Saga: New Moon; Sam Worthington – Clash of the Titans
Choice Movie Actress: Fantasy	Choice Movie: Drama
Gemma Arterton – Prince of Persia: The Sands of Time and Clash of the Titans; Rosario Dawson – Percy Jackson & the Olympians: The Lightning Thief; **Kristen Stewart – The Twilight Saga: New Moon**; Mia Wasikowska – Alice in Wonderland; Emma Watson – Harry Potter and the Half-Blood Prince	**The Blind Side**; Dear John; The Last Song; Remember Me; The Runaways
Choice Movie Actor: Drama	Choice Movie Actress: Drama
Jake Gyllenhaal – Brothers; Tobey Maguire – Brothers; **Robert Pattinson – Remember Me**; Jeremy Renner – The Hurt Locker; Channing Tatum – Dear John	**Sandra Bullock – The Blind Side**; Miley Cyrus – The Last Song; Dakota Fanning – The Runaways; Amanda Seyfried – Dear John; Kristen Stewart – The Runaways
Choice Movie: Romantic Comedy	Choice Movie Actor: Romantic Comedy
The Back-up Plan; Just Wright; Letters to Juliet; The Proposal; **Valentine's Day**	Gerard Butler – The Ugly Truth and The Bounty Hunter; Josh Duhamel – When in Rome; Joseph Gordon-Levitt – (500) Days of Summer; **Ashton Kutcher – Valentine's Day**; Ryan Reynolds – The Proposal
Choice Movie Actress: Romantic Comedy	Choice Movie: Comedy
Kristen Bell – When in Rome; **Sandra Bullock – The Proposal**; Jennifer Lopez – The Back-up Plan; Queen Latifah – Valentine's Day and Just Wright; Amanda Seyfried – Letters to Juliet	**Date Night**; Get Him to the Greek; Hot Tub Time Machine; Killers; She's Out of My League
Choice Movie Actor: Comedy	Choice Movie Actress: Comedy
Russell Brand – Get Him to the Greek; Steve Carell – Date Night; Jonah Hill – Get Him to the Greek; **Ashton Kutcher – Killers**; Chris Rock – Death at a Funeral	Kristen Bell – Couples Retreat; Lizzy Caplan – Hot Tub Time Machine; **Tina Fey – Date Night**; Zoe Saldaña – Death at a Funeral; Emma Stone – Zombieland
Choice Movie: Horror/Thriller	Choice Movie Actor: Horror/Thriller
A Nightmare on Elm Street; **Paranormal Activity**; Shutter Island; Splice; The Stepfather	Penn Badgley – The Stepfather; Adam Brody – Jennifer's Body; **Leonardo DiCaprio – Shutter Island**; Jackie Earle Haley – A Nightmare on Elm Street; Micah Sloat – Paranormal Activity
Choice Movie Actress: Horror/Thriller	Choice Movie: Animated
Katie Cassidy – A Nightmare on Elm Street; **Megan Fox – Jennifer's Body**; Audrina Patridge – Sorority Row; Michelle Williams – Shutter Island; Rumer Willis – Sorority Row	How to Train Your Dragon; Marmaduke; The Princess and the Frog; Shrek Forever After; **Toy Story 3**
Choice Movie: Villain	Choice Movie: Dance
Joseph Gordon-Levitt – G.I. Joe: The Rise of Cobra; Stephen Lang – Avatar; **Rachelle Lefevre – The Twilight Saga: New Moon**; Christopher Mintz-Plasse – Kick-Ass; Mickey Rourke – Iron Man 2	**Sandra Bullock and Betty White – The Proposal**; Miley Cyrus and Liam Hemsworth – The Last Song; Robert Downey Jr. – Iron Man 2; Tina Fey and Steve Carell – Date Night; Michael Jackson – Michael Jackson's This Is It
Choice Movie: Male Scene Stealer	Choice Movie: Female Scene Stealer
Sean Combs – Get Him to the Greek; George Lopez – Valentine's Day; **Kellan Lutz – The Twilight Saga: New Moon**; James Marsden – Death at a Funeral; Mark Wahlberg – Date Night	Dakota Fanning – The Twilight Saga: New Moon; **Ashley Greene – The Twilight Saga: New Moon**; Anne Hathaway – Alice in Wonderland and Valentine's Day; Anna Kendrick – The Twilight Saga: New Moon and Up in the Air; Betty White – The Proposal
Choice Movie: Male Breakout Star	Choice Movie: Female Breakout Star
Quinton Aaron – The Blind Side; Jesse Eisenberg – Zombieland and Adventureland; **Liam Hemsworth – The Last Song**; Aaron Johnson – Kick-Ass; Logan Lerman – Percy Jackson & the Olympians: The Lightning Thief	Gemma Arterton – Clash of the Titans; Alexandra Daddario – Percy Jackson & the Olympians: The Lightning Thief; Chloë Grace Moretz – Kick-Ass; **Taylor Swift – Valentine's Day**; Mia Wasikowska – Alice in Wonderland
Choice Movie: Chemistry	Choice Movie: Liplock
Sandra Bullock and Ryan Reynolds – The Proposal; Miley Cyrus and Liam Hemsworth – The Last Song; Taylor Lautner and Taylor Swift – Valentine's Day; Amanda Seyfried and Channing Tatum – Dear John; **Kristen Stewart and Robert Pattinson – The Twilight Saga: New Moon**	Russell Brand and Jonah Hill – Get Him to the Greek; Sandra Bullock and Ryan Reynolds – The Proposal; Miley Cyrus and Liam Hemsworth – The Last Song; Taylor Lautner and Taylor Swift – Valentine's Day; **Robert Pattinson and Kristen Stewart – The Twilight Saga: New Moon**
Choice Movie: Hissy Fit	Choice Movie: Fight
Jessica Biel – Valentine's Day; Sean Combs – Get Him to the Greek; **Miley Cyrus – The Last Song**; Giovanni Ribisi – Avatar; Vince Vaughn – Couples Retreat	Sean Combs vs. Russell Brand and Jonah Hill – Get Him to the Greek; Robert Downey Jr. and Don Cheadle vs. The Hammer Drones – Iron Man 2; Logan Lerman vs. Jake Abel – Percy Jackson & the Olympians: The Lightning Thief; **Mia Wasikowska vs. The Jabberwocky – Alice in Wonderland**; Sam Worthington vs. Stephen Lang – Avatar
Choice Summer Movie	Choice Summer Movie Star: Male
The A-Team; Despicable Me; Grown Ups; Inception; The Karate Kid; Knight and Day; The Last Airbender; Salt; The Sorcerer's Apprentice; **The Twilight Saga: Eclipse**	Zac Efron – Charlie St. Cloud; Taylor Lautner – The Twilight Saga: Eclipse; **Robert Pattinson – The Twilight Saga: Eclipse**; Adam Sandler – Grown Ups; Jaden Smith – The Karate Kid
Choice Summer Movie Star: Female	
Cameron Diaz – Knight and Day; Selena Gomez – Ramona and Beezus; Angelina Jolie – Salt; Emma Roberts – Twelve; **Kristen Stewart – The Twilight Saga: Eclipse**	

=== Television ===
Choice TV Show: Drama	Choice TV Actor: Drama
90210; **Gossip Girl**; Grey's Anatomy; House; The Secret Life of the American Teenager	Penn Badgley – Gossip Girl; Ken Baumann – The Secret Life of the American Teenager; **Chace Crawford – Gossip Girl**; Daren Kagasoff – The Secret Life of the American Teenager; Tristan Wilds – 90210
Choice TV Actress: Drama	Choice TV Show: Fantasy/Sci-Fi
Sophia Bush – One Tree Hill; Blake Lively – Gossip Girl; **Leighton Meester – Gossip Girl**; Olivia Wilde – House; Shailene Woodley – The Secret Life of the American Teenager	Fringe; Lost; Smallville; Supernatural; **The Vampire Diaries**
Choice TV Actor: Fantasy/Sci-Fi	Choice TV Actress: Fantasy/Sci-Fi
Josh Holloway – Lost; Joshua Jackson – Fringe; Ryan Kwanten – True Blood; Tom Welling – Smallville; **Paul Wesley – The Vampire Diaries**	**Nina Dobrev – The Vampire Diaries**; Evangeline Lilly – Lost; Hayden Panettiere – Heroes; Anna Paquin – True Blood; Anna Torv – Fringe
Choice TV Show: Action	Choice TV Actor: Action
24; Burn Notice; Chuck; Human Target; **NCIS: Los Angeles**	Jeffrey Donovan – Burn Notice; **Zachary Levi – Chuck**; LL Cool J – NCIS: Los Angeles; Kiefer Sutherland – 24; Mark Valley – Human Target
Choice TV Actress: Action	Choice TV Show: Comedy
Gabrielle Anwar – Burn Notice; Mary Lynn Rajskub – 24; Daniela Ruah – NCIS: Los Angeles; Katee Sackhoff – 24; **Yvonne Strahovski – Chuck**	The Big Bang Theory; **Glee**; Modern Family; Sonny with a Chance; Wizards of Waverly Place
Choice TV Actor: Comedy	Choice TV Actress: Comedy
Steve Carell – The Office; **Jonas Brothers – Jonas**; Sterling Knight – Sonny with a Chance; Cory Monteith – Glee; Jim Parsons – The Big Bang Theory	Miranda Cosgrove – iCarly; Kaley Cuoco – The Big Bang Theory; **Selena Gomez – Wizards of Waverly Place**; Demi Lovato – Sonny with a Chance; Lea Michele – Glee
Choice TV Show: Animated	Choice TV Show: Reality
American Dad!; The Cleveland Show; **Family Guy**; South Park; Star Wars: The Clone Wars	The Hills; Jersey Shore; **Keeping Up with the Kardashians**; The Price of Beauty; Taking the Stage
Choice TV Show: Reality Competition	Choice TV: Personality
America's Best Dance Crew; America's Next Top Model; **American Idol**; Dancing with the Stars; Project Runway	Nick Cannon; Simon Cowell; Cat Deeley; Mario Lopez; **Ryan Seacrest**
Choice TV: Villain	Choice TV: Male Scene Stealer
Russell Hantz – Survivor: Heroes vs. Villains; Jane Lynch – Glee; Terry O'Quinn – Lost; **Ian Somerhalder – The Vampire Diaries**; Ed Westwick – Gossip Girl	**Chris Colfer – Glee**; Johnny Galecki – The Big Bang Theory; Simon Helberg – The Big Bang Theory; James Lafferty – One Tree Hill; Matthew Morrison – Glee
Choice TV: Female Scene Stealer	Choice TV: Male Reality/Variety Star
**Hilary Duff – Gossip Girl**; Bethany Joy Galeotti – One Tree Hill; Kat Graham – The Vampire Diaries; Shenae Grimes – 90210; Amber Riley – Glee	Paul "Pauly D" DelVocchio – Jersey Shore; **Lee DeWyze – American Idol**; Brody Jenner – The Hills; Bret Michaels – Celebrity Apprentice; Michael "The Situation" Sorrentino – Jersey Shore
Choice TV: Female Reality/Variety Star	Choice TV: Breakout Show
Crystal Bowersox – American Idol; Kristin Cavallari – The Hills; Lauren Conrad – The Hills; **The Kardashians – Keeping Up with the Kardashians**; Nicole "Snooki" Polizzi – Jersey Shore	Community; Life Unexpected; Modern Family; **The Vampire Diaries**; Victorious
Choice TV: Female Breakout Star	Choice TV: Male Breakout Star
Dianna Agron – Glee; **Nina Dobrev – The Vampire Diaries**; Sarah Hyland – Modern Family; Bridgit Mendler – Good Luck Charlie; Mae Whitman – Parenthood	Ken Jeong – Community; Kevin McHale – Glee; Rico Rodriguez – Modern Family; Mark Salling – Glee; **Paul Wesley – The Vampire Diaries**
Choice TV: Parental Unit	Choice Summer TV Show
Rob Estes and Lori Loughlin – 90210; Bethany Joy Galeotti and James Lafferty – One Tree Hill; Lauren Graham – Parenthood; Bruce and Kris Jenner – Keeping Up with the Kardashians; **Mike O'Malley – Glee**	Make It or Break It; **Pretty Little Liars**; The Secret Life of the American Teenager; So You Think You Can Dance; Wipeout
Choice Summer TV Star: Male	Choice Summer TV Star: Female
Zachary Abel – Make It or Break It; Ken Baumann – The Secret Life of the American Teenager; **Ian Harding – Pretty Little Liars**; Daren Kagasoff – The Secret Life of the American Teenager; Stephen Moyer – True Blood	Nikki Blonsky – Huge; **Lucy Hale – Pretty Little Liars**; Josie Loren – Make It or Break It; Anna Paquin – True Blood; Shailene Woodley – The Secret Life of the American Teenager

=== Music ===
Choice Music: Male Artist	Choice Music: Female Artist
**Justin Bieber**; Jason Derulo; Drake; Adam Lambert; Usher	Miley Cyrus; Ke$ha; **Lady Gaga**; Shakira; Taylor Swift
Choice Music: Group	Choice Music: R&B Artist
The Black Eyed Peas; **Selena Gomez & the Scene**; Glee Cast; New Boyz; Young Money	**Beyoncé**; Alicia Keys; Rihanna; Trey Songz; Usher
Choice Music: Rap Artist	Choice Music: Rock Artist
Drake; **Eminem**; Jay Z; Ludacris; Pitbull	Kings of Leon; MGMT; Muse; **Paramore**; Train
Choice Music: Country Group	Choice Music: Male Country Artist
Gloriana; **Lady Antebellum**; Rascal Flatts; Sugarland; Zac Brown Band	Luke Bryan; Kenny Chesney; Brad Paisley; Darius Rucker; **Keith Urban**
Choice Music: Female Country Artist	Choice Music: Single
Miranda Lambert; Martina McBride; **Taylor Swift**; Carrie Underwood; Gretchen Wilson	"Bad Romance" – Lady Gaga; **"California Gurls" – Katy Perry**; "Can't Be Tamed" – Miley Cyrus; "Nothin' on You" – B.o.B featuring Bruno Mars; "Your Love Is My Drug" – Kesha
Choice Music: Country Song	Choice Music: Rap/Hip-Hop Track
**"Fifteen" – Taylor Swift**; "The House That Built Me" – Miranda Lambert; "Need You Now" – Lady Antebellum; "Undo It" – Carrie Underwood; "Water" – Brad Paisley	"Carry Out" – Timbaland featuring Justin Timberlake; "Hello Good Morning" – Diddy – Dirty Money featuring T.I.; "Find Your Love" – Drake; **"Love the Way You Lie" – Eminem featuring Rihanna**; "Wavin' Flag" – K'naan
Choice Music: Rock Track	Choice Music: Love Song
"All the Right Moves" – OneRepublic; "Breakeven" – The Script; "Hey, Soul Sister" – Train; **"Ignorance" – Paramore**; "You and Your Heart" – Jack Johnson	"Catch Me" – Demi Lovato; "Neutron Star Collision (Love Is Forever)" – Muse; "The Only Exception" – Paramore; "Stay" – Nick Jonas & the Administration; **"When I Look at You" – Miley Cyrus**
Choice Music: Country Album	Choice Music: Rap Album
Doin' My Thing – Luke Bryan; **Fearless – Taylor Swift**; The Foundation – Zac Brown Band; Need You Now – Lady Antebellum; Play On – Carrie Underwood	Battle of the Sexes – Ludacris; B.o.B Presents: The Adventures of Bobby Ray – B.o.B; The Blueprint 3 – Jay Z; **Relapse – Eminem**; So Far Gone – Drake
Choice Music: Rock Album	Choice Music: Pop Album
**Brand New Eyes – Paramore**; Leave This Town – Daughtry; The Resistance – Muse; Save Me, San Francisco – Train; To the Sea – Jack Johnson	Animal – Ke$ha; The E.N.D – The Black Eyed Peas; The Fame Monster – Lady Gaga; Here We Go Again – Demi Lovato; **My World 2.0 – Justin Bieber**
Choice Music: R&B Album	Choice Music: Male Breakout Artist
The ArchAndroid – Janelle Monáe; The Element of Freedom – Alicia Keys; **Jason Derulo – Jason Derulo**; Rated R – Rihanna; Raymond v. Raymond – Usher	**Justin Bieber**; B.o.B; Jason Derulo; Drake; Nick Jonas & the Administration
Choice Music: Female Breakout Artist	Choice Music: Hook-Up
Miranda Cosgrove; **Selena Gomez & the Scene**; Ke$ha; Demi Lovato; Nicki Minaj	**"Airplanes" – B.o.B featuring Hayley Williams**; "I Like It" – Enrique Iglesias featuring Pitbull; "If We Ever Meet Again" – Timbaland featuring Katy Perry; "Telephone" – Lady Gaga featuring Beyoncé; "We'll Be a Dream" – We the Kings featuring Demi Lovato
Choice Summer Song	Choice Summer Music Star: Female
"Airplanes" – B.o.B featuring Hayley Williams; "Alejandro" – Lady Gaga; "Billionaire" – Travie McCoy featuring Bruno Mars; **"California Gurls" – Katy Perry featuring Snoop Dogg**; "Your Love Is My Drug" – Kesha	Miley Cyrus; Kesha; **Lady Gaga**; Katy Perry; Rihanna
Choice Summer Music Star: Male	
**Justin Bieber**; B.o.B; Taio Cruz; Drake; Eminem	

=== Fashion ===
Choice Female Hottie	Choice Male Hottie
Jessica Biel; **Megan Fox**; Scarlett Johansson; Kim Kardashian; Katy Perry	Zac Efron; **Taylor Lautner**; Kellan Lutz; Robert Pattinson; Ian Somerhalder
Choice Celebrity Fashion Line	Choice Female Red Carpet Fashion Icon
House of Harlow 1960 – Nicole Richie; L.A.M.B – Gwen Stefani; **Miley & Max – Miley Cyrus and Max Azria**; Sean John – Sean "Diddy" Combs; William Rast – Justin Timberlake	Miley Cyrus; **Selena Gomez**; Lady Gaga; Eva Longoria; Katy Perry
Choice Male Red Carpet Fashion Icon	
Russell Brand; Jonas Brothers; Ashton Kutcher; **Taylor Lautner**; Justin Timberlake	

=== Miscellaneous ===
Choice Comedian	Choice Male Athlete
Aziz Ansari; **Ellen DeGeneres**; Jimmy Fallon; Chelsea Handler; George Lopez	**David Beckham**; Drew Brees; LeBron James; Apolo Anton Ohno; Albert Pujols
Choice Female Athlete	Choice Male Action Sports Star
Misty May-Treanor; Candace Parker; Danica Patrick; Lindsey Vonn; **Serena Williams**	Travis Pastrana; Kevin Pearce; **Ryan Sheckler**; Kelly Slater; Shaun White
Choice Female Action Sports Star	Choice Celebrity Smile
Torah Bright; Sarah Burke; Ashley Fiolek; **Maya Gabeira**; Hannah Teter	Miranda Cosgrove; Zac Efron; Victoria Justice; **Taylor Lautner**; Cory Monteith
Choice American Idol Alum	Choice Celebrity Activist
**David Archuleta**; Kelly Clarkson; Chris Daughtry; Jennifer Hudson; Carrie Underwood	Leonardo DiCaprio; Eva Longoria; Jessica Simpson; **Shakira**; Justin Timberlake
Choice Video Game	Choice Web Star
Band Hero; Green Day: Rock Band; Halo 3; **The Sims 3**; New Super Mario Bros. Wii	Greyson Chance; **Shane Dawson**; Fred Figglehorn; iJustine; Charles Trippy
Choice Twit	Choice Fanatic Fans
**Ellen DeGeneres**; Kim Kardashian; Ashton Kutcher; George Lopez; Ryan Seacrest	David Archuleta; Justin Bieber; Miley Cyrus; Glee; **The Twilight Saga**
