= Stay (Nick Jonas & the Administration song) =

Single by Nick Jonas & the Administration
- Released: 2 March 2010
- Recorded: 2010; Wiltern Theatre, Los Angeles, California
- Genre: Pop rock, soul
- Length: 6:43
- Label: Jonas, Hollywood
- Songwriter: Nicholas Jonas
- Producer: John Fields

Nick Jonas & the Administration singles chronology
"Who I Am" (2009)	"Stay" (2010)

"Stay" is the second single by Nick Jonas & the Administration. The song was not included on the album Who I Am.

== Background and composition ==
"Stay" "is a song Nick wrote when he had a day off in Washington. It came after some things that I was going through that really inspired it. and I'm just in a good place right now and was able to get a song out of it, which is always nice."

On 6 January Nick said about the song on Twitter:

Played a new song I wrote last night, at the show tonight called 'Stay'. It's about fallin for someone. I hope you like it when you hear it.One of the lines is... 'Now that the pain is done, no need to be afraid, we don't have time to waste, just tell me that you'll stay'. 'One more line from 'Stay'.'Beautiful, one of a kind. You're something special babe, and you don't even realize that your my hearts desire. One final line for the night. 'Its hard to believe where we are now, your hand in mine feels right somehow' – Stay"

In 2010, the song was nominated for a Teen Choice Award in the category Choice Music: Love Song.

== Release ==
On 2 March 2010, the band released the song "Stay" as a digital single and a digital EP. Jonas said that the song wouldn't be on their first record because he wrote it too late for it to be added. The digital single/digital EP of "Stay" contains only the live version of the song. Another live version of the song was recorded on 28 January at the Wiltern Theater in Los Angeles. In May 2010, the song was included on the live album Nick Jonas & the Administration: Live at the Wiltern January 28th, 2010.

== Track listing ==
Stay

EP by Nick Jonas & the Administration
- Released: 2 March 2010
- Recorded: 2010; Wiltern Theatre, Los Angeles, California
- Genres: Pop rock, soul
- Length: 18:18
- Label: Hollywood Records
- Producer: John Fields

Nick Jonas & the Administration chronology
Who I Am (2010)	Stay (2010)	Nick Jonas & the Administration Live at the Wiltern January 28th, 2010 (2010)

Digital single
No.	Title	Writer(s)	Length
1.	"Stay" (live)	Nick Jonas	6:43

Digital EP
No.	Title	Writer(s)	Length
1.	"Stay" (live)	Nick Jonas	6:43
2.	"Stay" (music video)	Nick Jonas	6:56
3.	"Rose Garden" (music video)	Nick Jonas	4:38
Total length:			18:18

Digital video
No.	Title	Writer(s)	Length
1.	"Stay" (live video)	Nick Jonas	6:56

Other versions

- "Stay" (live) – 7:51

== Music video ==
The basis of the video is a live performance of the song at the Wiltern theater during the Who I Am Tour. The video was released on the EP of Stay; which was released on 2 March 2010 as a digital download on iTunes.

== Live performances ==
Nick Jonas performed the song live for the first time on 6 January during the Who I Am Tour with the Administration. On 29 August 2010 he performed "Stay" on tour during a concert in Virginia Beach which was a part of the Jonas Brothers Live In Concert Tour.

On 23 February 2011 Nick performed the song during an acoustic set, accompanied by Jonas Brothers guitarist John Taylor. On 1 July, Nick performed the song live during the Microsoft Store Grand Opening in Century City. They performed the song on 16 July, during the Ottawa Blues fest. The song was also performed during the concerts of Nick Jonas & the Administration in South America.

The song was performed during the concert in Mexico of the Jonas Brothers World Tour 2012/2013. Stay was performed again in Rio de Janeiro on 12 March 2013. The song was performed again on 29 July during the Jonas Brothers Live Tour.

== Personnel ==
- Nick Jonas - lead vocals, lead guitar, composer
- Tommy Barbarella - keyboards
- Michael Bland - drums, vibraphone, vocals
- Sonny Thompson - guitars, vocals
- John Fields - bass, guitars, percussion, producer, vibraphone
- Dave McNair - mastering
- Jon Lind - A&R
- David Snow - creative director
- Enny Joo - art direction
- Olaf Heine - photography
- Paul David Hager - mixing
- Philip McIntyre - management
- Johnny Wright - management
- Kevin Jonas, Sr. - management

== Release history ==
Region	Date	Format	Label
Belgium	1 March 2010	Digital download - Digital Single	Hollywood Records
Germany	1 March 2010	Digital download - Digital Single	Hollywood Records
Germany	1 March 2010	Digital download - Digital Video	Hollywood Records
United States	2 March 2010	Digital download - Digital EP	Hollywood Records
United States	2 March 2010	Digital download - Digital Single	Hollywood Records
