= Teen Choice Award for Choice Music – Love Song =

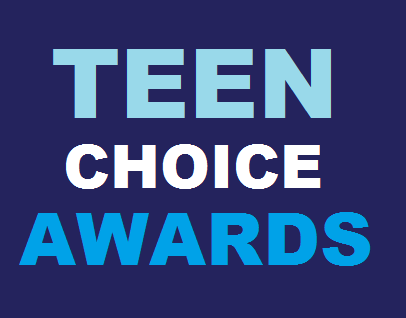
TEEN CHOICE AWARDS LOGO

The following is a list of Teen Choice Award winners and nominees for Choice Music – Love Song. One Direction receives the most wins with 5.

== Winners and nominees ==
=== 1999 ===
Year	Winner	Nominees	Ref.
1999	"I Don't Want to Miss a Thing" – Aerosmith	"Angel of Mine" – Monica; "Because of You" – 98 Degrees; "I'll Never Break Your Heart" – Backstreet Boys; "Kiss Me" – Sixpence None the Richer; "Love Like This" – Faith Evans; "So Anxious" – Ginuwine; ”Tearin’ Up My Heart” - *NSYNC; "When You Believe" – Mariah Carey and Whitney Houston	

=== 2000s ===
Year	Winner	Nominees	Ref.
2000	"Where You Are" – Jessica Simpson featuring Nick Lachey	"Back at One" – Brian McKnight; "From the Bottom of My Broken Heart" – Britney Spears; "I Knew I Loved You" – Savage Garden; "I Turn to You" – Christina Aguilera; "I Wanna Love You Forever" – Jessica Simpson; "Show Me the Meaning of Being Lonely" – Backstreet Boys; "Thank God I Found You" – Mariah Carey featuring 98 Degrees and Joe	
2001	"Angel" – Shaggy featuring Rayvon	"Crazy for This Girl" – Evan and Jaron; "Ghost of You and Me" – BBMak; "If You're Gone" – Matchbox Twenty; "Irresistible" – Jessica Simpson; "Nobody Wants to Be Lonely" – Ricky Martin with Christina Aguilera; "Shape of My Heart" – Backstreet Boys; "This I Promise You" – *NSYNC	
2002	"U Got It Bad" – Usher	"All You Wanted" – Michelle Branch; "Can't Get You Out of My Head" – Kylie Minogue; "Drowning" – Backstreet Boys; "Gone" – *NSYNC; "Hero" – Enrique Iglesias; "Underneath Your Clothes" – Shakira; "Wherever You Will Go" – The Calling	
2003	"Crazy in Love" – Beyoncé featuring Jay Z	"Come Away with Me" – Norah Jones; "I'm Glad" – Jennifer Lopez; "I'm With You" – Avril Lavigne; "A Moment Like This" – Kelly Clarkson; "Picture" – Kid Rock featuring Sheryl Crow; "Pretty Baby" – Vanessa Carlton; "Running" – No Doubt	
2004	"I Miss You" – Blink-182	"8th World Wonder" – Kimberley Locke; "Burn" – Usher; "Everytime" – Britney Spears; "If I Ain't Got You" – Alicia Keys; "The Reason" – Hoobastank; "Sorry 2004" – Ruben Studdard; "Take My Breath Away" – Jessica Simpson	
2005	"We Belong Together" – Mariah Carey	"Beautiful Soul" – Jesse McCartney; "Cater 2 U" – Destiny's Child; "Incomplete" – Backstreet Boys; "Let Me Love You" – Mario; "Slow Down" – Bobby Valentino; "Sunday Morning" – Maroon 5; "You and Me" – Lifehouse	
2006	"What's Left of Me" – Nick Lachey	"Be Without You" – Mary J. Blige; "For You I Will (Confidence)" – Teddy Geiger; "So Sick" – Ne-Yo; "You and Me" – Lifehouse; "You're Beautiful" – James Blunt	
2007	"With Love" – Hilary Duff	"Don't Matter" – Akon; "First Time" – Lifehouse; "Lost Without U" – Robin Thicke; "Stolen" – Dashboard Confessional	
2008	"When You Look Me in the Eyes" – Jonas Brothers	"Bleeding Love" – Leona Lewis; "Bubbly" – Colbie Caillat; "No Air" – Chris Brown and Jordin Sparks; "No One" – Alicia Keys	
2009	"Crush" – David Archuleta	"Halo" – Beyoncé; "How Do You Sleep?" – Jesse McCartney; "Love Story" – Taylor Swift; "Lovebug" – Jonas Brothers	

=== 2010s ===
Year	Winner	Nominees	Ref.
2010	"When I Look At You" – Miley Cyrus	"Catch Me" – Demi Lovato; "Neutron Star Collision (Love Is Forever)" – Muse; "Stay" – Nick Jonas & the Administration; "The Only Exception" – Paramore	
2011	"Love You Like a Love Song" – Selena Gomez & the Scene	"Come Down with Love" – Allstar Weekend; "Just the Way You Are" – Bruno Mars; "Mine" – Taylor Swift; "Teenage Dream" – Katy Perry	
2012	"What Makes You Beautiful" – One Direction	"Die in Your Arms" – Justin Bieber; "Give Your Heart a Break" – Demi Lovato; "Home" – Phillip Phillips; "I Won't Give Up" – Jason Mraz	
2013	"Little Things" – One Direction	"Just Give Me a Reason" – P!nk featuring Nate Ruess; "Mirrors" – Justin Timberlake; "Treasure" – Bruno Mars; "The Way" – Ariana Grande featuring Mac Miller	
2014	"You & I" – One Direction	"All of Me" – John Legend; "Boom Clap" – Charli XCX; "Not a Bad Thing" – Justin Timberlake; "Somebody to You" – The Vamps featuring Demi Lovato	
2015	"Night Changes" – One Direction	"Black Magic" – Little Mix; "Earned It" – The Weeknd; "Sledgehammer" – Fifth Harmony; "Sugar" – Maroon 5; "Thinking Out Loud" – Ed Sheeran	
2016	"Perfect" – One Direction	"Close" – Nick Jonas featuring Tove Lo; "Hands to Myself" – Selena Gomez; "Into You" – Ariana Grande; "Secret Love Song" – Little Mix featuring Jason Derulo; "Vapor" – 5 Seconds of Summer	
