= Nick Jonas & the Administration =

American rock band

- Official logo

Background information
- Origin: Los Angeles, California, U.S.
- Genres: Blue-eyed soul; soul; blues; blues rock
- Years active: 2009–2011; 2016
- Label: Hollywood
- Spinoff of: Jonas Brothers, New Power Generation
- Past members: Nick Jonas; John Fields; Michael Bland; Tommy Barbarella; Sonny Thompson; David Ryan Harris
- Website: nickjonas.com

Nick Jonas & the Administration was a band formed in late 2009 as a side project by Nick Jonas of the Jonas Brothers. Performers included singer, pianist, guitarist, drummer, and songwriter Nick Jonas, bassist John Fields, drummer Michael Bland, keyboardist Tommy Barbarella, and guitarist David Ryan Harris. Sonny Thompson replaced Harris during the 2010 Who I Am Tour.

== History ==
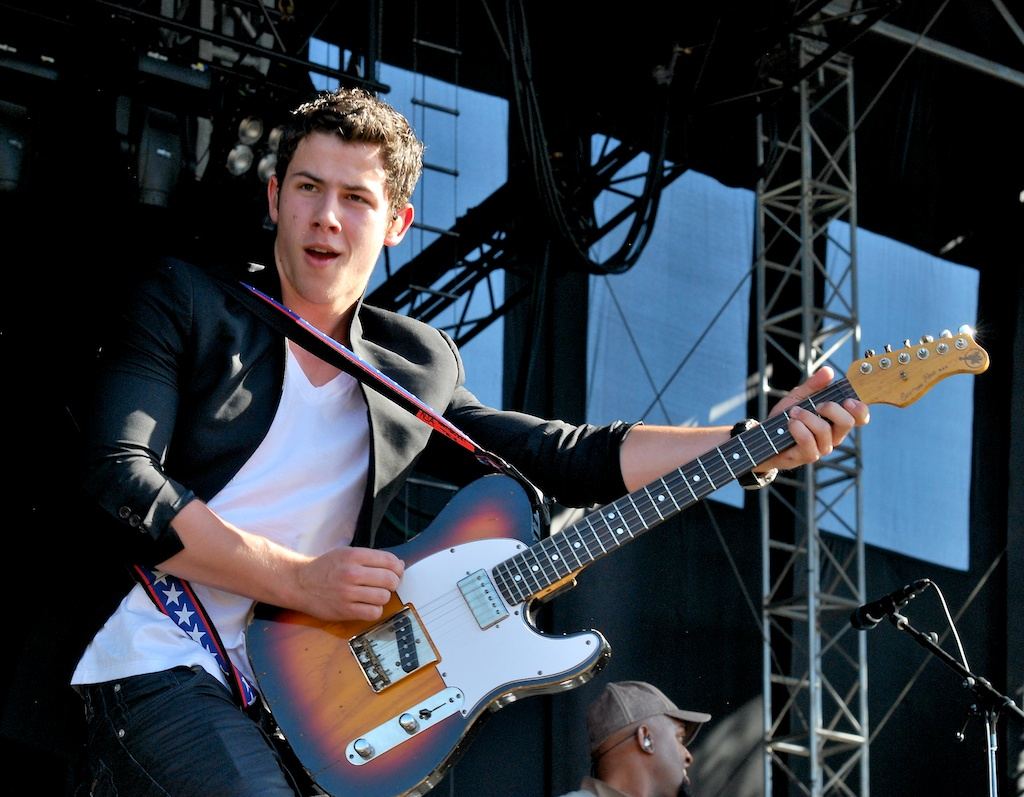
Nick Jonas, vocalist of the band, in 2011

=== Group formation ===
"I had written five or six songs that were on my heart, things that were just pouring out of me with this new and exciting sound," said Jonas. "They weren't necessarily right for the Jonas Brothers, but I thought they could be perfect for something else."

The band was announced on the official MySpace page of the Jonas Brothers on October 30, stating it was just a "side project" and that this was not the end of the band. "I'm kind of modeling it after Bruce Springsteen & The E Street Band," Nick said. "It's kind of the look we were going for stylistically on the album cover and just the project in general... [Springsteen] pours so much passion and emotion into all of his songs every night and I hope I can capture that too."

The Administration members Michael Bland, Tommy Barbarella and Sonny Thompson formerly played together in Prince's New Power Generation from 1991 to 1996. All three were original members.

=== 2009–2010: Who I Am ===
The first single from the album, "Who I Am", was officially released on December 3, 2009, followed by the release of the music video. The group made its live debut performing the song on the Grammy Nominations Concert Live special December 2 on CBS. Jonas cut the album in eight days with producer John Fields, who also played bass. The album has nine new tracks and a cover of the Jonas Brothers single "Tonight". Jonas originally wrote the song "World War III" for the Administration, but instead it was used on the Jonas Brothers album Lines, Vines and Trying Times. He also wrote a song called "Oval Office" that did not appear on the record because according to Jonas it did not sound good. "Rose Garden" was the first song written for the album and was partly inspired by a difficult break-up. Previews of the songs "Olive & an Arrow", "Last Time Around", "State of Emergency", "Stronger (Back on the Ground)" and "Vesper's Goodbye" were released online before the official album release. Their debut album Who I Am was released on February 2, 2010, as a standard edition CD and limited edition CD+DVD and reached number 3 on the Billboard 200 albums chart, selling over 80,000 copies. Jonas promoted the album on February 2 during various mini live chats with Sonny Thompson. Jonas performed with Thompson acoustic versions of the songs "Last Time Around", "Who I Am", "Tonight" during Radio Disney Total Access; he also promoted the album during TV performances. Their single "Who I Am" was featured on Radio Disney Jams, Vol. 12, along with songs by other popular artists. Jams 12 was officially released on March 30, 2010. As of May 2010, the album had sold over 151,000 copies in the U.S.

In January 2010, Nick Jonas & the Administration toured in support of their debut album, Who I Am. Apart from guest appearances at specific events, it marked the first time Jonas toured without his brothers, Kevin and Joe. Kevin and Joe did appear on certain dates to sing a song with Nick. Frankie Jonas appeared on the last tour day. Diane Birch was the major support act of the tour. The tour took place in small, intimate venues in the United States. While on tour Nick Jonas and the Administration performed new songs such as "Stay" (which he wrote and recorded while he was on tour; it was performed after January 6), "I Do" (performed on the last day of tour) "While the World Is Spinning", and "A Lot of Love to Spill"; they also performed remixes of the Jonas Brothers songs "Inseparable" and "Before the Storm". At the end of the tour they recorded the video clips for the songs "Rose Garden" and "Stay". The tour began on January 2, in Dallas, Texas and ended January 30, in Berkeley, California.

On March 2, 2010, they released the song "Stay" as a digital single and a digital EP. Jonas said that the song would not be on the record because he wrote it too late. He also said that "Stay" "is a song I wrote that day we had off in Washington. It came after some things that I was going through that really inspired it.. and I'm just in a good place right now and was able to get a song out of it, which is always nice."

=== 2010: Jonas Brothers Live in Concert World Tour 2010 ===
While announcing Nick Jonas' side-project Nick Jonas and the Administration, the brothers announced they were planning a world tour to take place during the summer of 2010. After August 7, 2010, Nick Jonas performed "Who I Am" without the members of the Administration during the North American leg of the Jonas Brothers Live in Concert tour. During the performance of the song he often stopped and gave a speech. On August 28, 2010, in Atlantic City Jonas performed "Rose Garden". The next day (August 29, 2010), he performed "Stay" on tour during a concert in Virginia Beach. On September 18, Jonas performed two songs: "Who I Am" and "Last Time Around" during a concert in Mountain View, California.

There was an announcement that Nick Jonas & the Administration would open for the Jonas Brothers Live in Concert tour during the concerts in South America; soon after, the Jonas Brothers released a statement where they denied this. On October 15, he performed "Who I Am" during the concerts in South America. During the concert in Porto Alegre (Brazil) on November 10, he performed "Rose Garden" before "Who I Am".

Other songs he performed solo during the two legs of the tour were "Introducing Me" and sometimes "A Little Bit Longer" and "Black Keys".

On October 18, 2010, Nick Jonas & the Administration appeared on the submission list for the Grammy Awards 5 times.^{[a]}

=== 2011: Promotional concerts and touring ===
On February 23, 2011, Jonas held a free acoustic set, accompanied by Jonas Brothers guitarist and musical director John Taylor. Nick asked the fans to create their own version of a setlist, in a contest through Twitter. He performed songs from his solo album, Jonas Brothers songs and a new song "London Foolishly", which he wrote during his stay in London for the musical, Les Misérables. Along with Sonny Thompson, Jonas performed at the Military Event in Columbus, Ohio on April 14, 2011. He played the songs "Last Time Around" and "Who I Am".

On July 1, Jonas performed during the Microsoft Store Grand Opening in Century City. He performed songs of his solo album, as well as cover songs and Jonas Brothers songs. The American singer Jasmine Villegas opened for him.

On July 16, 2011, the band performed at the Cisco Bluesfest in Ottawa, Canada. On August 13 they performed at Musikfest. The concert was cancelled in the middle of Jonas's performance (about 1 hour into the set list) due to severe weather.

February 23, 2011
1. Last Time Around
2. Rose Garden
3. Our House (Ocean Grove cover)
4. Before The Storm
5. Stay
6. Give Love A Try
7. Top 40 Medley:
  1. Teenage Dream (Katy Perry cover)
  2. Just the Way You Are (Bruno Mars cover)
8. Lovebug
9. London Foolishly (new song)
10. BB Good
11. SOS
12. Who I Am
13. Inseparable
July 1, 2011
- The Edge of Glory (Lady Gaga cover)
- Just the Way You Are (Bruno Mars cover)
- See No More (Joe Jonas cover)
- Who I Am
- Stay
- Introducing Me
- When You Look Me in the Eyes
- Gotta Find You
- Fly with Me
- New Song (no official name was announced)
- Rose Garden
- SOS
The songs are not in the correct order.
July 16, 2011
1. Last Time Around
2. Conspiracy Theory
3. State of Emergency
4. Mashup:
  1. A Little Bit Longer (acoustic)
  2. Yellow (Coldplay cover)
5. Hello Beautiful
6. SOS (blues/r&b version)
7. With You (song from Microsoft Store Grand Opening )
8. Stay
9. Covers:
  1. Someone Like You (Adele cover)
  2. Just the Way You Are (Bruno Mars cover)
10. When You Look Me In the Eyes
11. Rose Garden
12. Inseparable
13. Who I Am
August 23, 2011
1. Last Time Around
2. Conspiracy Theory
3. State of Emergency
4. Mashup:
  1. It Takes Two (Hairspray cover)
  2. A Little Bit Longer (acoustic)
  3. Yellow (Coldplay cover)
5. London Foolishly
6. With You (song from Microsoft Store Grand Opening )
7. Gotta Find You
8. SOS (Summer Remix)
9. Rose Garden
10. Covers:
  1. Someone Like You (Adele cover)
  2. Just the Way You Are (Bruno Mars cover)
11. BB Good (with ocean grove)
12. Still in Love with You (with ocean grove)

On October 1, they performed in Buenos Aires at the Estadio G.E.B.A. On July 12, Jonas announced through Facebook that there would be more shows in South America. On July 14, Jonas announced a concert in Chile for October 4. On July 21, he announced a concert in Paraguay; he announced a second concert in Argentina on July 22. On August 2, Jonas confirmed five concerts in Brazil and one in Venezuela. On August 5, 2011, there was an announcement from Jonas through his Facebook page about a concert in Uruguay.

On September 3, 2011, Jonas announced through Twitter that Ocean Grove Band would be going on tour with them. On September 6, a concert in Puerto Rico was announced. On September 21, the first day of the tour, it was announced that Jonas' last concert date of the tour (San Juan, Puerto Rico on October 11) was cancelled. The producer of the Puerto Rico date, César Sainz, confirmed the information the same day. Jonas's reason to cancel the last show was that his training for the role of J. Pierrepont Finch, which replaced Harry Potter actor Daniel Radcliffe and Glee's Darren Criss, in the revival of Broadway's How to Succeed in Business Without Really Trying would take place in Los Angeles starting on October 10. On September 23, the news was confirmed via Nick Jonas' website.

On December 13, 2011, a video of Jonas performing "Last Time Around" was posted online as part of a new internet series Fandrop. The video shows fans seeing Nick Jonas & the Administration rehearse for Jonas's 2011 tour. On December 14 a teaser for the next episode went online, showing Nick talking about "Conspiracy Theory". The second episode premiered on December 15, 2011. On December 15 the second episode went online, showing the performance of "Conspiracy Theory" by Nick Jonas & the Administration. On December 16 a teaser for the next episode showed Nick playing the intro of "Who I Am". This episode premiered on December 20, 2011. On December 20, the episode was uploaded online, showing Jonas performing "Who I Am". A teaser for episode 4 also went online, showing Jonas warming up his vocals for the last episode; which aired on December 22, 2011. On December 22, the last episode aired, showing Nick Jonas & the Administration performing their version of the Jonas Brothers song "Inseparable".

=== 2012–2016: Leaving label, Jonas Brothers tours, hiatus and reunion ===
It was announced on May 2, 2012, that the band had parted ways with their record label Hollywood Records; Jonas bought the rights of their music. On May 20, 2012, Jonas performed an acoustic version of the songs "Who I Am" and "Last Time Around" in a six-song acoustic set between two shows of How to Succeed in Business Without Really Trying.

Set list
1. Last Time Around
2. Gotta Find You
3. Lovebug
4. What Makes You Beautiful (One Direction cover)
5. Just the Way You Are (Bruno Mars cover)
6. Who I Am

The songs "Who I Am" and "Last Time Around" were performed during all of the Jonas Brothers World Tour 2012/2013. During the concert in Monterrey, Mexico, the songs "Stay" and "State of Emergency" were also performed. "Stay" was performed again in Rio de Janeiro on March 12, 2013. The songs "Who I Am" and "Last Time Around" were performed again as part of the main set list during the Jonas Brothers Live Tour. On July 29, "Stay" was also performed and on July 30, "Vesper's Goodbye". On July 31, "Stay" was performed with Sonny Thompson.

On August 31, 2016, Jonas announced that the band would reunite for a one-night-only concert in Minneapolis, Minnesota on the same day. The show sold out in less than two hours. The band performed every song from their debut album along with "Stay" and "Inseparable" from 2007's Jonas Brothers.

Set list
1. Last Time Around
2. Inseparable
3. Olive and an Arrow
4. State of Emergency
5. Vesper's Goodbye
6. Conspiracy Theory
7. Honestly
8. Stay
9. In the End
10. Tonight
11. Rose Garden
12. Who I Am
13. Stronger

== Band members ==
Final lineup

- Nick Jonas – lead vocals, rhythm guitar, drums, piano (since 2009)
- John Fields – bass, backing vocals (since 2009)
- Michael Bland – drums, percussion, backing vocals (since 2009)
- Tommy Barbarella – synthesizers, keyboards (since 2009)
- Sonny Thompson – lead guitar, backing vocals (since 2009)

Former members

- David Ryan Harris – lead guitar, backing vocals (2009)

Touring members

- Chris Bailey – drums (2011)
- Joshua Dunham – rhythm guitar, lead guitar (2011)
- Marcus Kincy – keyboards (2011)

== Discography ==
Nick Jonas & the Administration discography
- Studio albums: 1
- Live albums: 1
- Singles: 2
- Music videos: 3
- Tours: 2

=== Studio albums ===
List of albums, with selected chart positions
| Title | Album details | Peak chart positions | | | | | | | | | Sales | Certifications (sales threshold) |
| Title | Album details | US | AUS | BEL (FL) | CAN | GRE | MEX | NL | SPA | UK | Sales | Certifications (sales threshold) |
|---|---|---|---|---|---|---|---|---|---|---|---|---|
| Who I Am | Release date: February 2, 2010; Label: Hollywood; Formats: CD, CD+DVD, digital download | 3 | 46 | 17 | 4 | 4 | 1 | 27 | 4 | 50 | US: 179,000 | MEX: Gold |

=== Live albums ===
| Title | Album details |
|---|---|
| Nick Jonas & The Administration Live at the Wiltern January 28th, 2010 | Released: May 11, 2010; Label: Hollywood; Formats: digital download |

=== Extended plays ===
| Title | EP details |
|---|---|
| Stay | Released: March 2, 2010; Label: Hollywood; Formats: digital download |

=== Singles ===
| Title | Year | Peak positions | | | | | | | Album |
| Title | Year | US | US Heat. | BEL (FL) Tip | BEL (WA) Tip | CAN | KOR | UK | Album |
|---|---|---|---|---|---|---|---|---|---|
| "Who I Am" | 2009 | 73 | 4 | 10 | 16 | 48 | 37 | 103 | Who I Am |
| "Stay" | 2010 | — | 24 | — | — | — | — | — | Non-album single |
"—" denotes releases that did not chart

=== Music videos ===
| Year | Song | Director |
|---|---|---|
| 2009 | "Who I Am" | Tim Wheeler |
| 2010 | "Rose Garden" ^{[b]}^{[c]} | Live Nation |
| 2010 | "Stay" ^{[b]} | Live Nation |

=== Other appearances ===
| Year | Song | Album |
|---|---|---|
| 2010 | "Who I Am" | Radio Disney Jams, Vol. 12 |
| 2010 | "Who I Am" | Disney Sing It: Party Hits ^{[d]} |
| 2019 | "Rose Garden" | Music from Chasing Happiness |

== Tours ==
- Who I Am Tour (2010)
- 2011 Tour (2011)

== Filmography ==
TV Appearances
| Year | Film | Role | performance |
|---|---|---|---|
| 2009 | Grammy Nominations Concert Live | Himself | Who I Am |
| 2010 | Late Night with Jimmy Fallon | Himself | Who I Am |
| 2010 | Critics Choice Awards | Himself | Who I Am |
| 2010 | Late Show with David Letterman | Himself | Rose Garden |
| 2010 | The Jay Leno Show | Himself | Who I Am |
| 2010 | The Ellen DeGeneres Show | Himself | Who I Am |
| 2011 | Fandrop | Himself | Last Time Around; Conspiracy Theory; Who I Am; Inseparable |

== Awards and nominations ==
Nick Jonas & the Administration awards and nominations
Awards and nominations
| Award | Wins | Nominations |
| Teen Choice | 0 | 2 |

Totals (Note: Certain award groups do not simply award one winner. They acknowledge several different recipients, have runners-up, and have third place. Since this is a specific recognition and is different from losing an award, runner-up mentions are considered wins in this award tally. For simplification and to avoid errors, each award in this list has been presumed to have had a prior nomination.)
- Wins: 0
- Nominations: 3

List of awards and nominations received by Nick Jonas & the Administration.

=== Teen Choice Awards ===
The Teen Choice Awards is an annual awards show established in 1999 by the Fox Broadcasting Company. Nick Jonas & the Administration have received 2 nominations.

| Year | Title | Award | Nominated work | Result |
|---|---|---|---|---|
| 2010 | Teen Choice Awards | Choice Music: Love Song | "Stay" | Nominated |
| 2010 | Teen Choice Awards | Choice Breakout Artist: Male | "Nick Jonas & the Administration" | Nominated |

=== Hollywood Teen TV Awards ===
| Year | Nominee / work | Award | Result |
|---|---|---|---|
| 2010 | Themselves | Teen Pick Music: Male Artist | Nominated |

== See also ==
- List of songs by Nick Jonas & the Administration
- Jonas Brothers
- Tonight
- Rose Garden
- Stay
- Who I Am
- Last Time Around

== Notes ==
1. They Were on the list in the categories: Album of the year, Record of the year, Song of the year, Best short form music video, Best pop vocal album.
2. The basis of the video is a live performance of the song at the Wiltern theater during the Who I Am Tour.
3. Rose Garden is the only song of the record which is not a single but got an official music video. The video of Rose Garden was released on the EP of Stay; which was released as a digital download on iTunes.
4. Who I Am was also released in 2010 on the karaoke video game Disney Sing It: Party Hits.
