= Introducing Me =

Song by Nick Jonas

from the album Camp Rock 2: The Final Jam
- Released: August 10, 2010
- Recorded: 2009
- Studio: B.Y. Studio's, Venice, California
- Genre: Pop rock
- Length: 3:07 (album version)
- Label: Walt Disney
- Songwriter: Jamie Houston
- Producer: Jamie Houston

"Introducing Me" is a song recorded by Nick Jonas for the Camp Rock 2: The Final Jam soundtrack.

== Background and composition ==
"Introducing Me"
A sample of "Introducing Me" by Nick Jonas, where the first chorus is heard.

In 2009, Nick Jonas recorded the song for the Camp Rock 2: The Final Jam soundtrack. His character Nate performs the song to Dana (actress Chloe Bridges) who plays Nick's love interest in Camp Rock 2. The song was released in the UK in August 2010.

"Introducing Me" was also released on the karaoke video game Disney Sing It: Party Hits during that year.

=== Critical reception ===
In November 2010, singer Jason Mraz admitted in an interview that the Camp Rock 2 tune "Introducing Me" sounded a lot like his song "I'm Yours". He also said: "I heard the song, and it was just a tremendous, tremendous horror of a tune. I noticed a few similarities in the melody, but it wasn't enough to pick up the phone and argue with somebody about it. If anything, I just wanted my $1.29 back that I spent on iTunes".

== Track listing ==
Digital Download

- "Introducing Me" - 3:07

== Live performances ==
Jonas performed the song live for the first time during the Jonas Brothers Live In Concert tour on August 7, 2010. At select venues during the tour he tried to play the song faster each time. His record was under 2 minutes.

He also performed the song live on July 1, 2011 during the Microsoft Store Grand Opening in Century City. The song was also performed live after "Gotta Find You" during the concerts of the Nick Jonas 2011 Tour.

On May 16, 2012 he performed the song on General D. Chappie James Middle School of Science in New York, during a surprise visit.

On July 13, 2013 the song was performed again as part of the setlist of the Jonas Brothers Live Tour. It was performed again on August 3.

== Chart performance ==
The song entered the Canadian Billboard Hot 100 at number 66 on the week ending September 26, 2012 and climbed the next week to number 53. That week the song entered the US Billboard Hot 100 at number 92.

== Charts ==
Chart (2010)	Peak position
Austrian Singles Chart	68
Belgium (Ultratop 50 Wallonia)	44
Canadian Hot 100	53
German Singles Chart	73
Irish Singles Chart	32
UK Singles Chart	51
U.S. Billboard Hot 100	92

== Certifications ==
Region	Certification	Certified units/sales
New Zealand (RMNZ)	Gold	15,000^{‡}
United Kingdom (BPI)	Silver	200,000^{‡}
United States (RIAA)	Platinum	1,000,000^{‡}
^{‡} Sales+streaming figures based on certification alone.

== Personnel ==
Credits for Camp Rock 2: The Final Jam soundtrack:

- Nick Jonas - lead vocals
- Jamie Houston - producer, mixer, songwriter

== Release history ==
Region	Date	Format	Label
United Kingdom	August 6, 2010	Digital download	Walt Disney Records
United States	August 7, 2010	Radio Disney	Walt Disney Records
France	August 9, 2010	Digital download	Walt Disney Records
Austria	August 9, 2010	Digital download	Walt Disney Records
Germany	August 9, 2010	Digital download	Walt Disney Records
United States	August 10, 2010	Digital download	Walt Disney Records
The Netherlands	September 3, 2010	Digital download	Walt Disney Records
