= Back to Black (disambiguation) =

Back to Black is a 2006 album by Amy Winehouse.

Back to Black may also refer to:

- "Back to Black" (song), the album's title track
- Back to Black (band), an American R&B band
- Amy Winehouse: Back to Black, a 2018 documentary film about Amy Winehouse
- Back to Black (film), a 2024 biographical drama about Amy Winehouse
  - Back to Black (soundtrack), the accompanying soundtrack and album

== See also ==
- Back in Black (disambiguation)
