= Who I Am (Nick Jonas & the Administration album) =

2010 studio album by Nick Jonas & the Administration

Studio album by Nick Jonas & the Administration
- Released: February 2, 2010
- Recorded: April 2009
- Studio: Blackbird (Nashville)
- Genres: Blues rock; blue-eyed soul; R&B
- Length: 41:21
- Label: Hollywood
- Producer: John Fields

Nick Jonas & the Administration chronology
Who I Am (2010)	Live at the Wiltern January 28th, 2010 (2010)

Singles from Who I Am
- 1. "Who I Am" Released: December 3, 2009

Who I Am is the only studio album by American blues rock band Nick Jonas & the Administration. It was released on February 2, 2010, through Hollywood Records. The group made its live debut performing a single of the same name on the Grammy Nominations Concert Live special on December 2, 2009, on CBS.

Jonas cut the album in eight days with producer John Fields, who also played bass. Additional members of the Administration include drummer Michael Bland and keyboardist Tommy Barbarella, both of whom played in The New Power Generation. Guitarist David Ryan Harris played on the album, but a third former NPG member, Sonny Thompson, replaced him on live shows.

== Background ==
"Rose Garden" was the first song written for the album and was partly inspired by a difficult break-up. Jonas wrote or co-wrote all tracks. Jonas cut the album in eight days with producer John Fields, who also played bass. The album has nine new numbers and a cover of the Jonas Brothers single "Tonight". Nick originally wrote the song "World War III" for the administration, but instead it was used of the Jonas Brothers album Lines, Vines and Trying Times. He also wrote a song called "Oval Office" but the songs never appeared on the record because according to Nick the song didn't sound good.

== Critical reception ==
Professional ratings
Review scores
Source	Rating
AllMusic	2.5/5 stars
BBC	(mixed)
Boston Globe	(negative)
Entertainment Weekly	(B−)
Los Angeles Times	2/4 stars
NOW	2/5 stars
Rolling Stone	3/5 stars
Slant Magazine	2/5 stars

The album received mixed or average reviews by music critics.

== Commercial performance ==
It debuted at number three with 82,000 on the Billboard 200. 'Stay" was released as a digital single on March 2. The album has sold 179,000 copies in the US.

== Tour ==
In late December 2009 and January 2010, Nick Jonas & the Administration toured in support of their debut album, Who I Am. Apart from guest appearances at specific events, it marked the first time Nick toured without his brothers, Kevin and Joe.

In September 2011 and October 2011, Nick Jonas & the Administration toured through South America featuring material from this album, Who I Am.

== Singles ==
The first single of the album "Who I Am" was officially released on December 3, 2009, followed by the release of the music video. The group made its live debut performing a single of the same name on the Grammy Nominations Concert Live special December 2 on CBS.

== Track listing ==
All tracks are produced by John Fields.

Who I Am track listing
No.	Title	Writer(s)	Length
1.	"Rose Garden"	Nicholas Jonas	3:34
2.	"Who I Am"	N. Jonas	4:05
3.	"Olive & an Arrow"	N. Jonas	4:59
4.	"Conspiracy Theory"	N. Jonas	3:47
5.	"In the End"	N. Jonas; Greg Garbowsky; PJ Bianco	4:52
6.	"Last Time Around"	N. Jonas; Garbowsky; Bianco	4:07
7.	"Tonight"	N. Jonas; Joseph Jonas; Kevin Jonas II; Garbowsky	4:19
8.	"State of Emergency"	N. Jonas; John Fields	3:34
9.	"Vesper's Goodbye"	N. Jonas; Bianco	3:11
10.	"Stronger (Back on the Ground)"	N. Jonas; Leeland Mooring; Jack Mooring	4:54
Total length:			41:21

Notes

- The Limited Edition DVD features intimate studio performances for tracks 1–8, directed by Tim Wheeler.
- The Enhanced CD provides access to the websites of Nick Jonas & the Administration, and also codes for downloading all the songs of the album, plus cover songs "Don't Close the Book" and "Rock With You" for mobiles.
- "Tonight" is a new version of the Jonas Brothers' song of the same name.

== Personnel ==
Credits are adapted from the album's liner notes.

=== Musicians ===
- Nick Jonas – lead vocals, guitars
- Tommy Barbarella – keyboards
- Michael Bland – drums, vibraphone, vocals
- David Ryan Harris – guitars, vocals
- John Fields – bass, guitars, percussion, vibraphone, producer
- Jonny Lang – additional choir vocals (track 10)
- Kevin Jonas Sr. – additional choir vocals (track 10), management
- Michael Logen – additional choir vocals (track 10)

=== Technical ===
- Dave McNair – mastering
- Paul David Hager – mixing
- Jon Lind – A&R
- Philip McIntyre – management
- Johnny Wright – management
- David Snow – creative director
- Enny Joo – art direction, design
- Olaf Heine – photography

== Nick Jonas & the Administration Live at the Wiltern January 28th, 2010 ==
Nick Jonas & the Administration Live at the Wiltern January 28th, 2010

Live album by Nick Jonas & the Administration
- Released: May 11, 2010
- Recorded: January 28, 2010
- Venues: Wiltern Theatre, Los Angeles
- Genres: Blues rock; R&B; blue-eyed soul
- Length: 76:10
- Labels: Hollywood; Jonas
- Producers: Live Nation; John Fields

Nick Jonas & the Administration chronology
Stay (2010)	Nick Jonas & the Administration Live at the Wiltern January 28th, 2010 (2010)

Nick Jonas & the Administration Live at the Wiltern January 28, 2010 is the first live album from Nick Jonas & the Administration; which was released on May 11, 2010.

=== Background ===
From January 26 until January 29, Nick Jonas & the Administration performed four concerts in Los Angeles all of the concerts took place in the Wiltern Theater, as part of the Who I Am Tour. The concert on January 28 was recorded and released digitally on May 11, 2010.

During the filming of the show, music videos of the songs "Rose Garden" and "Stay" were filmed.

=== Track listing ===
No.	Title	Writer(s)	Length
1.	"Last Time Around"	Nick Jonas; Greg Garbowsky; P.J. Bianco	7:16
2.	"Inseparable" (new version)	Nick Jonas; Joe Jonas; Kevin Jonas; Joshua Miller	5:25
3.	"Olive & an Arrow"	Nick Jonas	8:06
4.	"State of Emergency"	Nick Jonas; John Fields	4:06
5.	"While the World Is Spinning"	Nick Jonas	4:01
6.	"Black Keys / A Little Bit Longer"	Nick Jonas	7:16
7.	"Vesper's Goodbye"	Nick Jonas; P.J. Bianco	3:31
8.	"Conspiracy Theory"	Nick Jonas	4:32
9.	"Stay"	Nick Jonas	7:51
10.	"Rose Garden"	Nick Jonas	6:42
11.	"Stronger (Back on the Ground)"	Nick Jonas; Leeland Mooring; Jack Mooring	6:14
12.	"Tonight" (new version)	Nick Jonas; Joe Jonas; Kevin Jonas; Greg Garbowsky	5:47
13.	"Who I Am"	Nick Jonas	5:23
Total length:			76:10

Notes
- "Tonight" and "Inseparable" are new versions of the original Jonas Brothers songs.
- "Black Keys" and "A Little Bit Longer" are both written by Nick Jonas.
- "Stay" and "While the World Is Spinning" are songs written by Nick Jonas after Who I Am was released.

=== Personnel ===
- Nick Jonas – lead vocals, lead guitar, piano
- Tommy Barbarella – keyboards
- Michael Bland – drums, vibraphone, vocals
- Sonny Thompson – guitars, vocals
- John Fields – bass, guitars, percussion, vibraphone
- Live Nation – producer
- John Fields – producer

== Release history ==
=== Who I Am ===
Region	Date	Edition
Mexico	January 19, 2010	Standard edition; deluxe edition; digital download
Netherlands; Poland	January 29, 2010	Standard edition; deluxe edition; digital download
Ireland; UK; Scandinavia	February 1, 2010	Standard edition; deluxe edition; digital download
United States; Canada; Argentina	February 2, 2010	Standard edition; deluxe edition; digital download
Australia; Italy	February 5, 2010	Standard edition; deluxe edition; digital download
Spain; Brazil	February 9, 2010	Standard edition; deluxe edition; digital download
Japan	February 11, 2010	Standard edition; deluxe edition; digital download
Europe; Germany	February 19, 2010	Standard edition; deluxe edition; digital download
Philippines	February 22, 2010	Standard edition; deluxe edition; digital download
South Korea	February 25, 2010	Standard edition; deluxe edition; digital download
India	March 3, 2010	Standard edition; deluxe edition; digital download
Germany	August 13, 2010	Limited (Slidepack)
Netherlands	August 26, 2010	Limited (Slidepack)

=== Nick Jonas & the Administration Live at the Wiltern January 28th, 2010 ===
Region	Date	Edition
United Kingdom	May 11, 2010	Digital download

== Charts ==
Chart (2010)	Peak position	Certification/Sales (sales thresholds)
Argentine Album Chart	1	
Australian Albums Chart	46	
Belgium (Flanders) Albums Chart	17	
Belgium (Wallonia) Albums Chart	45	
Brazil Top 10 CD Sales	10	
Canadian Albums Chart	4	
Dutch Albums Chart	27	
French Album Chart	60	
German Album Chart	78	
Greece Album Chart	4	
Irish Albums Chart	29	
Mexican Albums Chart	1	Gold
New Zealand Album Chart	25	
Portuguese Album Chart	9	
Polish Albums Chart	46	
Spain Album Chart	4	
South Korean Gaon Chart	40	
UK Albums Chart	50	
U.S. Billboard 200	3	151,000
