= Nicholas Jonas (album) =

2004 studio album by Nick Jonas

Studio album by Nicholas Jonas
- Released: November 23, 2004
- Genre: CCM; pop
- Length: 40:37
- Label: INO; Daylight; Columbia
- Producer: Carl Sturken; Evan Rogers

Nicholas Jonas chronology
Nicholas Jonas (2004)	Songs from How to Succeed in Business Without Really Trying (2012)

Singles from Nicholas Jonas
- 1. "Dear God" Released: October 18, 2004; 2. "Joy to the World (A Christmas Prayer)" Released: November 22, 2004

Nicholas Jonas is the debut studio album by the American singer-songwriter Nicholas Jonas. It was released on November 23, 2004, through INO, Daylight and Columbia Records. The album was produced by duo Carl Sturken and Evan Rogers.

== Background ==
Nicholas Jonas began his career at eight years old, when he landed a role as understudy of the 2000 production of "A Christmas Carol" at Madison Square Garden. A year later, he made his Broadway debut as Little Jake in a revival of "Annie Get Your Gun". He then played two more Broadway shows, "Beauty and the Beast", where he played as Chip, and "Les Misérables", where he played as Gavroche.

After recording a demo of his first song, "Joy to the World (A Christmas Prayer)", it was sent to executives at INO Records. Eventually, Jonas was signed to Columbia Records as a solo artist by record executive David Massey.

== Production ==
While starring on Broadway, Jonas wrote "Joy to the World (A Christmas Prayer)" with his father, Kevin Jonas Sr. The first version of the song featured vocals from his "Beauty and the Beast" cast members.

Whilst writing songs for the project, Jonas enlisted his brothers Joe and Kevin Jonas, along with other collaborators. One of the first songs the brothers wrote together was "Please Be Mine". The song was described by Variety as a "dreamy pop-rock ballad" which demonstrates the brothers' "honey-dipped harmonies".

== Singles ==
The album was supported by the release of two singles: "Dear God", released on October 18, 2004, and "Joy to the World (A Christmas Prayer)" released on November 22, 2004.

"Joy to the World (A Christmas Prayer)" charted on the Billboard Adult Contemporary chart, peaking at number 14, on the week of December 11, 2004. It also charted on the Billboard Hot Christian Songs and Christian Airplay charts, both peaking at number 8, on the week of January 1, 2005.

== Critical reception ==
Professional ratings
Review scores
Source	Rating
AllMusic	3/5 stars

The album received a three out of five stars review on AllMusic, with Rick Anderson calling 12-year-old Jonas a stage prodigy, comparing to the likes of a young Stevie Wonder. He wrote that the debut album was a "mixed bag", but complimented Jonas vocal abilities—specially considering his young age. Anderson highlighted the songs "Time for Me to Fly" and "Higher Love" as standouts on the album, whilst remarking "Crazy Kind of Crush" as a "not cool to rip off the Jackson 5".

== Track listing ==
All tracks are produced by Carl Sturken and Evan Rogers.

Nicholas Jonas track listing
No.	Title	Writer(s)	Length
1.	"Dear God"	Carl Sturken; Evan Rogers	3:20
2.	"Time for Me to Fly"	Nicholas Jonas; Joseph Jonas; Kevin Jonas II; Kevin Jonas Sr.; PJ Bianco	3:30
3.	"Appreciate"	James Bourne; Savan Kotecha; Jake Schulze	3:09
4.	"When You Look Me in the Eyes"	N. Jonas; J. Jonas; K. Jonas; K. Jonas Sr.; Bianco; Raymond Boyd	4:02
5.	"Higher Love"	Steve Winwood; Will Jennings	3:59
6.	"Please Be Mine"	N. Jonas; J. Jonas; K. Jonas	4:22
7.	"I Will Be the Light"	N. Jonas; Sturken; Rogers	4:24
8.	"Don't Walk Away"	N. Jonas; Eric White	3:43
9.	"Joy to the World (A Christmas Prayer)"	N. Jonas; K. Jonas Sr.	4:27
10.	"Crazy Kinda Crush on You"	N. Jonas; Sturken; Rogers	2:59
11.	"Wrong Again"	N. Jonas; K. Jonas Sr.; Sturken; Rogers	4:01
Total length:			40:37

Note

- "Higher Love" is a cover of the 1986 song by the English singer Steve Winwood.
