= Michael Bland =

American musician

- Also known as: Michael B. (with The New Power Generation)
- Born: Michael Bland; March 14, 1969 (age 57)
- Origin: Minneapolis, Minnesota, United States
- Genres: Rock; soul; funk; pop; electronica
- Occupations: Musician; producer
- Instruments: Drums; percussion; piano
- Years active: 1989–present

Michael Bland (born March 14, 1969) is an American musician best known as a drummer for Prince starting in 1989. He was with Prince during The New Power Generation era and played with him live and on albums for seven years.

From 1995 to 1997, Bland, along with Sonny Thompson, recorded and played live with French pop star France Gall—they appear on one studio album and two live albums.

In 2010, Bland became a member of Nick Jonas & the Administration (a side project of Nick Jonas of the Jonas Brothers) along with other former members of The New Power Generation, bass player Sonny T. and keyboardist Tommy Barbarella. He worked with Vulfpeck playing drums on "Hero Town," which was released October 2017.

== Life and career ==
Bland was born in Minneapolis, Minnesota. He graduated from Minneapolis South High School in 1987. He still lives in Minneapolis, but plays in Los Angeles as a session drummer for such artists as Mandy Moore, Clay Aiken, Backstreet Boys, and the Anchorman soundtrack.

He played with Prince from 1989 to 1996, Paul Westerberg in 1996, Chaka Khan in 1997, and Maxwell 1998–2000. In 1997, he auditioned as drummer for the new Guns N' Roses lineup. Although Josh Freese had already been hired, he was working with A Perfect Circle and unable to totally commit. Bland was being considered as a possible full time option.

In 2000, he played in the Minneapolis project of French reed player Michel Portal (the rest of the band was Tony Hymas, Sonny T., Vernon Reid and Jef Lee Johnson). With Jef Lee Johnson and Sonny T., Michael Bland created News from the Jungle, which recorded one album for Universal, also produced by Jean Rochard. Both bands, Michel Portal's and News from the Jungle, toured in France (Paris Olympia). Bland also played on several tracks of the Michel Portal album Birdwatcher in 2006.

In 2005, Bland was the drummer for Paul Westerberg's tour, and he recently played on the Hurricane Katrina Relief telethon with the Dixie Chicks. Bland is also now working as a producer, currently working with the upcoming rock-pop band Catchpenny, also from Minneapolis.

He is the drummer on Soul Asylum's album The Silver Lining. He also tours with them.

Bland, with colleague and ex-NPG member Sonny T. (Thompson) teamed up with Prince once again to provide drumming for the title track of Prince's 3121 album.

Bland also played drums on Indigenous's 2006 album, Chasing the Sun.

In 2007 Bland & Thompson laid down the rhythm tracks for some tracks on Prince's 2007 CD Planet Earth.

During the fall of 2007 Michael Bland has been busy working on a release by his own protégé, Mayda, performing with her regularly in the Minneapolis area as well as recording a studio album. Her first release, the Stereotype EP, came out in 2007. Michael Bland continued working with Mayda and played on and produced a full-length album with her in 2009, titled The Interrogation.

Bland and Thompson recorded with Prince, yet again, on his album Lotusflow3r, which was released in 2009.

Also in 2009, Bland became a part of Nick Jonas' band, Nick Jonas and The Administration, along with ex-Prince bandmates, Sonny T. and Tommy Barbarella. This also led to several TV performances with the group, an album, and a tour in early 2010.

In a 2016 tribute to Prince for The Pods & Sods Network, Michael shares memories about joining the New Power Generation, Prince as a bandleader, working in the studio and reflections about his time in Prince's band.

According to Cory Wong, Bland is known to tune his snare drum to the tonic pitch of the song.

Bland still records and tours with Soul Asylum. The band toured in 2020, in support of its latest release "Hurry Up And Wait". The tour was cut short by COVID-19.

== Discography ==
- I Am – Elisa Fiorillo (1990)
- Smile Blue – Ricky Peterson (1991)
- Diamonds and Pearls – Prince and the New Power Generation (1991)
- Whatever Happened to the Blues – Phil Upchurch (1992)
- I'm Ready – Tevin Campbell (1993)
- The Voice – Mavis Staples (1993)
- 1-800-NEW-FUNK – Various Artists (1994)
- Come – Prince and the New Power Generation (1994)
- 3 Chains o' Gold – Prince and the New Power Generation (1994)
- The Gold Experience – Prince and the New Power Generation (1995)
- A Tear Can Tell – Ricky Peterson (1995)
- Love Is Strange – Phil Upchurch (1995)
- Closer than Close – Rosie Gaines (1995)
- Chaos and Disorder – Prince (1996)
- Emancipation – Prince (1996)
- France – France Gall (1996)
- Live at the Olympia – France Gall (1996)
- Salinas – Luis Salinas (1996)
- Eventually – Paul Westerberg (1996)
- Concert Privé – France Gall (1997)
- That's Right – George Benson (1997)
- Crystal Ball – Prince (1998)
- CPR – David Crosby (1998)
- Minneapolis – Michel Portal (2000)
- Now – Maxwell (2001)
- News From The Jungle – Jef Lee Johnson (2001)
- The Handler – Har Mar Superstar (2004)
- Coverage – Mandy Moore (2004)
- Open Season Motion Picture Soundtrack - (Paul Westerberg) (2005)
- 3121 – Prince (2006)
- Turn Around – Jonny Lang (2006)
- The Silver Lining – Soul Asylum (2006)
- Birdwatcher – Michel Portal (2007)
- Planet Earth – Prince (2007)
- Bringing Back the Funk – Brian Culbertson (2008)
- Breakout – Miley Cyrus (2008)
- Lotusflow3r – Prince (2009)
- Who I Am – Nick Jonas & the Administration (2010)
- Crescendo in Duke - Benoît Delbecq (2012)
- Delayed Reaction - Soul Asylum (2012)
- Change Of Fortune - Soul Asylum (2016)
- Mr. Finish Line – Vulfpeck (2017)
- Hurry Up And Wait - Soul Asylum (2020)
- The Striped Album - Cory Wong (2020)
- Passion at a Distance - Leo Courbot (2024)

From and.

== See also ==
- List of drummers
