= Back to Black (band) =

American musical group

- Origin: Minneapolis, Minnesota, United States
- Genres: Rhythm and blues; funk; rock music; Minneapolis sound
- Years active: circa 1972
- Members: Randy Barber; Ronald Bronson; Calvin Cyprian; Joe Lewis; Pierre Lewis; Bill Perry; Sonny Thompson; Jeff Tresvant (JT Apollo); Roland Willis Jr.; Harry Moss (manager)

Back to Black was a band formed in Minneapolis around 1970. They changed their name to The Family, a name later adopted by Prince for The Family. They were the house band at The Way community center, and performed at the Phyllis Wheatley Community Center (both now demolished). Prince considered them a lifelong influence. Their bassist, Sonny Thompson, worked with Prince in the New Power Generation from 1991 to 1996.
