= Back in Black (disambiguation) =

Back in Black is the 1980 album by Australian rock band AC/DC.

Back in Black may also refer to:

- "Back in Black" (song), the title track of the album by AC/DC
- Back in Black (Cypress Hill album), a 2022 album by Cypress Hill
- Back in Black (Whodini album), the third album by American hip hop group Whodini
- Spider-Man: Back in Black, a 5-part Marvel Comics storyline about the fictional superhero Spider-Man
- Back in Black (novel), the fifth novel in the A-List series by Zoey Dean
- "Back in Black" (Power Rangers), the fifth episode of Power Rangers: Dino Thunder
- "Back in Black with Lewis Black", a recurring segment of The Daily Show
- "Back in Black", the tagline of the 2002 film Men in Black II
- "Back in Black", the season 3 premiere of the incomplete animated show Generator Rex
- "Back in Black", an episode of the 2012 animated show Ultimate Spider-Man
- "Back in Black", a season 2 episode of The Loud House
- "Back in Black" (Reno 911!), a 2008 television episode

== See also ==
- Back to Black (disambiguation)
