= Who I Am (Nick Jonas & the Administration song) =

2009 single by Nick Jonas & the Administration

Single by Nick Jonas & the Administration

from the album Who I Am
- Released: December 3, 2009
- Recorded: 2009
- Studio: Blackbird Studio's, Nashville, Tennessee
- Length: 4:05 (album version); 3:36 (radio edit)
- Label: Jonas, Hollywood
- Songwriter: Nicholas Jonas
- Producer: John Fields

Nick Jonas & the Administration singles chronology
"Who I Am" (2009)	"Stay" (2010)

Music video
- "Who I Am" on YouTube

"Who I Am" is the debut single by Nick Jonas & the Administration, released in December 2009. It is from their 2010 debut album of the same name. The group performed the song for the first time at the Grammy Nominations concert live special on December 2, 2009.

== Background and composition ==
"Who I Am"
A 24 second sample of "Who I Am" by Nick Jonas & the Administration, where a portion of the chorus is heard.

Talking about his album's title track, Nick (the leader) says "It's about how I want someone to love me for my passion for music. It's all I've ever thought about "Who I Am is really about me talking about myself and realizing you need to know yourself before you can find love."

== Release ==
"Who I Am" had been confirmed to be the first single from Nick Jonas and the Administration's debut album. It was released as a digital download on December 3, 2009.

The single was featured on Radio Disney Jams, Vol. 12, along with songs by other popular artists. Jams 12 was officially released on March 30, 2010. On May 11, 2010, it the song was used on the live album: Nick Jonas & The Administration Live at the Wiltern January 28th, 2010. It was also released in 2010 on the karaoke video game Disney Sing It: Party Hits.

=== Cover version ===
In July 2010, singer David Choi released a cover of the song on his cover album YouTube Covers.

== Music video ==
The basis of the video is a section of him performing with his band along with shots of different people ranging from a gothic girl to someone who had cancer that has existed for three generations of family. They are looking for 'Real life individuals to pose for living portraits that tell us who they are. Each subject flips the card to reveal a simple statement of identity, including himself identifying himself as a brother, a diabetic and "just me".'

A music video ecard was also released for the song "Who I Am".

== Live performances ==
Jonas performed the song live for the first time during the Grammy Award nominations. The song was also performed on the Who I Am Tour with the Administration. On January 29, 2010, he performed the song with his brothers during the concert.

Nick Jonas & Sonny Thompson performed on January 30, 2010, an acoustic version of the song "Tonight" along with the songs "Who I Am" and "Last Time Around" during Radio Disney Total Access. As of August 7, 2010 he performs the song during the Jonas Brothers Live In Concert World Tour 2010.

On February 23, 2011, Nick performed the song during an acoustic set, accompanied by Jonas Brothers guitarist John Taylor.

Along with Sonny Thompson, Jonas performed at the Military Event in Columbus, Ohio on April 14, 2011. He played the songs "Last Time Around" and "Who I Am." And on June 8, 2011, Jonas performed the songs solo while in New York On July 1, Jonas performed the song live during the Microsoft Store Grand Opening in Century City. They performed the song on July 16, during the Ottawa Blues fest. The song was also performed during the concerts in South America.

On December 16, a teaser for the next Fandrop episode went online, it shows Jonas playing the intro of "Who I Am". This episode premiered on December 20, 2011 On December 20 the episode was online, it shows Nick performing Who I Am.

On May 20, 2012, Nick performed an acoustic version of the song in between two shows of How to Succeed in Business Without Really Trying.

The song was performed during all of the Jonas Brothers World Tour 2012/2013. They performed the song again on June 1 during the Acapulco Festival in Mexico. The song "Who I Am" was performed again during the Jonas Brothers Live Tour.

Nick has performed the song at selected dates on two of his solo tours, Nick Jonas: Live in Concert (2015) and Future Now Tour (2016)

== Personnel ==
- Nick Jonas – lead vocals, lead guitar, composer
- Tommy Barbarella – keyboards
- Michael Bland – drums, vibraphone, vocals
- Sonny Thompson – guitars, vocals (on DVD Who I Am, and live performances)
- John Fields – bass, guitars, percussion, vibraphone, producer
- David Ryan Harris – guitars, vocals (on CD Who I Am)
- Dave McNair – mastering
- David Snow – creative director
- Enny Joo – art direction
- Olaf Heine – photography
- Paul David Hager – mixing

== Charts ==
Chart (2009–2010)	Peak position
Belgium (Ultratip Bubbling Under Flanders)	10
Belgium (Ultratip Bubbling Under Wallonia)	16
Canada Hot 100 (Billboard)	48
South Korean Gaon Chart	37
UK Singles Chart	103
US Billboard Hot 100	73
US Billboard Digital Songs	84

== Release history ==
Region	Date	Format	Label
United States	December 3, 2009	Digital download	Hollywood Records
Europe	December 8, 2009	Digital download	Hollywood Records
Germany	January 29, 2010	Digital download	Hollywood Records
United States	February 2, 2010	Digital download	Hollywood Records
Japan	February 2, 2010	Digital download	Hollywood Records
