= Terraza del C.C.C.T. =

Event center in Caracas, Venezuela

Centro Ciudad Comercial Tamanaco
- Terraza del Centro Ciudad Comercial Tamanaco
- Location: Caracas, Venezuela
- Owner: C.C.C.T
- Capacity: 5,000 (Concerts)

The Centro Ciudad Comercial Tamanaco is a shopping center in Caracas, Venezuela with a 5,000 seat event center.

== Events ==
Events at the Terrace of the C.C.C.T:

Date	Country	Artist	Tour
2001	France	Manu Chao	
2002	Colombia	Juanes	
2002	España	Enrique Bunbury	
2002	Mexico	Zurdok	
2002	Uruguay	Jorge Drexler	
2004	Mexico	Molotov	
2004	Jamaica	Sean Paul	
2004	España	Álex Ubago	
2009	USA	Backstreet Boys	
2009	Mexico	Vicente Fernández	
2009	España	La Quinta Estación	
2009	España	Melendi	
2010	Canada	Nelly Furtado	
2010	USA United Kingdom	Dream Theater + Whitesnake	
2010	USA	Bigelf	
2010	Argentina	Teen Angels	
2010	España	Hombres G	
2010	Mexico	Camila	
2010	Panama	Miguel Bosé	
2010	Spain	David Bisbal	
2010	Mexico	Camila	
2010	Panama	Miguel Bosé	
2010	España	Mónica Naranjo	
2010	United States	Limp Bizkit	
2011	United States	Paramore	
2011	United States	Backstreet Boys	
2011	Italy	Andrea Bocelli	
2011	Mexico	Julieta Venegas	
2011	Mexico	Alejandro Fernández	
2011	Canada	Avril Lavigne	
2011	Spain	Enrique Iglesias	
2011	Argentina Mexico	Noel Schajris + Camila	
2011	Mexico	Julieta Venegas	
2011	Netherlands	Dj Tiesto	
2011	United States	Nick Jonas	
2011	Puerto Rico	Luis Fonsi	
2011	Puerto Rico	Olga Tañón	
2012	Italy	Laura Pausini	
2012	Dominican Republic	Juan Luis Guerra	
2012	Venezuela	Guaco (band)	
2012	United Kingdom	Marillion	
2012	Sweden	Roxette	
2012	USA	Sky Blu	
2012	Spain	Julio Iglesias	
2012	United Kingdom	Ali Campbell	
2012	United States	Romeo Santos	
2012	Spain	Hombres G featuring Melendi	
2012	Guatemala	Ricardo Arjona	
2012	SpainUSASwitzerlandFrance	Il Divo	
2012	Puerto RicoSpain	Olga Tañon & Natalia Jiménez	
2012	Puerto Rico	Gilberto Santa Rosa	
2012	United StatesPuerto Rico	Marc Anthony & Chayanne	
2013	United States	Steve Aoki	
2013	Venezuela	Guaco, Gilberto Santa Rosa, Lena Burke, Andrés Cepeda, Claudia Santos, Luis Enrique	
2013	VenezuelaColombia	Tecupae, Oscarcito, Fonseca (singer)	
2013	Puerto RicoMexico	Olga Tañon & Marco Antonio Solis	
2013	Colombia	Silvestre Dangond	
2013	Italia	Mauro Picotto	
2013	Mexico Colombia	Ana Gabriel & Jorge Celedon	
2013	Argentina	Fito Páez	
