= Who I Am Tour =

2010 concert tour by Nick Jonas & the Administration

- Nacional tour by Nick Jonas & the Administration
- Location: U.S., North America
- Associated album: Who I Am
- Start date: January 2, 2010
- End date: January 30, 2010
- Legs: 1
- No. of shows: 21

Nick Jonas & the Administration concert chronology
- Who I Am Tour (2010); 2011 Tour (2011)

The Who I Am Tour was the first headlining concert tour by American band Nick Jonas & the Administration, showcasing their debut album, Who I Am. The tour took place in small, intimate venues around the United States. The tour kicked began and ended in January 2010.

On February 4, 2010 reported totals from eight venues placed the band in fifth for Billboard's Hot Tours of the week grossing $1,065,479.

== Background ==
In January 2010, Nick Jonas & the Administration toured in support of their debut album, Who I Am. Apart from guest appearances at specific events, it marks the first time Nick has toured without his brothers, Kevin and Joe. Kevin and Joe did appear on certain dates to sing a song with Nick. Frankie Jonas appeared on the last tour day. Diane Birch was the major support act of the tour. The tour took place in small, intimate venues in the United States. While on tour Nick Jonas and the Administration performed new songs such as "Stay" (which he wrote and recorded while he was on tour; he performed it after January 6) "I Do" (performed on the last day of tour) and "While the World Is Spinning", "A Lot of Love to Spill", they also performed remixes of the Jonas Brothers songs "Inseparable" and "Before the Storm"; at the end of the tour they recorded the video clips for the songs "Rose Garden" and "Stay". The tour began on January 2, in Dallas, Texas and ended January 30, in Berkeley, California.

== Support act ==
- Joe and Kevin Jonas
- Don't Wait Up (January 13th with Travis Clark)
- Rewind
- Forgiveness
- Fools
- Valentino
- Forever Seven (January 8 only)
- The Rule (January 21 only)
- Diane Birch
Diane Birch Setlist

=== Surprise guests ===
- Joe Jonas – (January 8 during Please Be Mine, January 29 during LoveBug and Who I Am)
- Kevin Jonas – (January 8 during Please Be Mine, January 29 during LoveBug and Who I Am)
- Travis Clark of We The Kings – (January 13 during "Don't Wait Up" with support act Diane Birch)
- Frankie Jonas – (January 29 during "Lovebug")

== Set list ==
Setlist Opening Night
1. Rose Garden
2. Olive & An Arrow
3. Last Time Around
4. In the End
5. Inseparable (New Version)
6. State Of Emergency
7. I Just Want To Celebrate
8. A Lot of Love To Spill
9. While the World is Spinning
10. Medley:
  1. Black Keys
  2. A Little Bit Longer
11. Vesper's Goodbye
12. Fireflies
13. Use Somebody
14. Signed, Sealed, Delivered (I’m yours)
15. Conspiracy Theory
16. Stronger (Back On The Ground)
17. Tonight (New Version)
18. Who I Am
Main Setlist
1. Rose Garden
2. State of Emergency
3. Olive and an Arrow
4. Last Time Around
5. Inseparable (New Version)
6. While the World is Spinning
7. Medley:
  1. Black Keys
  2. A Little Bit Longer
8. Please Be Mine
9. Vesper's Goodbye [was not played on January 8]
10. Fireflies (Owl City cover)
11. Use Somebody (Kings of Leon cover)
12. Catch Me (Demi Lovato cover) [added January 8]
13. You Belong With Me (Taylor Swift cover) [added January 10]
14. Before The Storm (Solo version) [performed January 3 – January 13]
15. Signed, Sealed, Delivered I'm Yours (Stevie Wonder cover) [was not played on January 3, January 8, January 17, January 21, January 23, January 26]
16. The Way You Make Me Feel (Michael Jackson cover) [played January 3, January 6, January 8, January 9, and January 13]
17. Conspiracy Theory
18. Stay (added January 6)
19. Stronger (Back On The Ground)
20. Tonight (New Version)
21. Who I Am
The order in which the songs are performed varies throughout the tour.
Setlist January 8th
1. Last Time Around
2. Inseparable (New Version)
3. Olive & An Arrow
4. State of Emergency
5. While The World Was Spinning
6. Fireflies
7. Use Somebody
8. Empire State of Mind
9. Catch Me
10. Before The Storm
11. Medley:
  1. Black Keys
  2. A Little Bit Longer
12. Please Be Mine (with Joe Jonas and Kevin Jonas)
13. Stay
14. The Way You Make Me Feel
15. Conspiracy Theory
16. Rose Garden
17. Stronger (Back On The Ground)
18. Tonight (New Version)
19. Who I Am
Setlist January 17th
1. Rose Garden
2. State Of Emergency
3. Olive & An Arrow
4. Inseparable (New Version)
5. While The World Is Spinning
6. Medley:
  1. Black Keys
  2. A Little Bit Longer
7. Fireflies
8. Use Somebody
9. What Did I Do To Your Heart
10. You Belong With Me
11. Catch Me
12. Fly With Me
13. Hello Beautiful
14. Last Time Around
15. I Just Want To Celebrate
16. Conspiracy Theory
17. Stay
18. Stronger (Back On The Ground)
19. Tonight (New Version)
20. Who I Am
Setlist Final Night
1. Last Time Around
2. Inseparable (New Version)
3. Olive & An Arrow
4. State Of Emergency
5. While The World Is Spinning
6. Fireflies
7. Use Somebody
8. Catch Me
9. You Belong With Me
10. What Did I Do To Your Heart
11. Hello Beautiful
12. Fly With Me
13. I Do
14. Medley:
  1. Black Keys
  2. A Little Bit Longer
15. Conspiracy Theory
16. Signed, Sealed, Delivered (I’m Yours)
17. Stay
18. Rose Garden
19. Tonight (New Version)
20. Who I Am

=== Other songs ===
In addition to the regular set list the band played other songs, including a variety of covers, that were only performed on certain dates:

- I Just Want to Celebrate by Rare Earth (January 2 in Dallas; January 9 in Upper Darby; January 12 in Boston; January 16 in Detroit, Michigan; January 17 in Rosemont)
- Empire State of Mind by Jay-Z featuring Alicia Keys (January 8 in New York City)
- Please Be Mine by Jonas Brothers (January 8 in New York City) [performed with brothers Kevin and Joe]
- Can't Have You by Jonas Brothers (January 10 in Upper Darby; January 16 in Detroit)
- Lovebug by Jonas Brothers (January 10 in Upper Darby; January 16 in Detroit; January 28 in Los Angeles, January 29 in Los Angeles)
- When You Look Me In The Eyes by Jonas Brothers (January 10 in Upper Darby; January 12 in Boston; January 20 in Milwaukee; January 21 in Minneapolis; January 27 in Los Angeles; January 28 in Los Angeles)
- Fly With Me by Jonas Brothers (January 17 in Rosemont; January 23 in Denver; January 29 in Los Angeles; January 30 in Berkeley)
- Hello Beautiful by Jonas Brothers (January 13 in Boston; January 17 in Rosemont; January 23 in Denver; January 26 in Los Angeles; January 30 in Berkeley)
- The Climb by Miley Cyrus (January 13 in Boston)
- My Own Way by Honor Society (January 13 in Boston; January 27 in Los Angeles)
- S.O.S. by Jonas Brothers (January 16 in Detroit; January 29 in Los Angeles)
- What Did I Do To Your Heart by Jonas Brothers (January 17 in Rosemont; January 19 in St. Louis; January 20 in Milwaukee; January 21 in Minneapolis; January 26 in Los Angeles; January 27 in Los Angeles; January 28 in Los Angeles; January 29 in Los Angeles; January 30 in Berkeley)
- Get Back by Demi Lovato (January 29 in Los Angeles)
- I Do (Wedding Song written for Kevin and Danielle Jonas) by Nick Jonas (January 30 in Berkele)

== Tour dates ==
| Date | City | Country | Venue |
|---|---|---|---|
Who I Am Tour
| December 2, 2009 | Los Angeles | United States | 2010 Grammy Nomination Ceremony |
North America
| January 2, 2010 | Dallas | United States | House of Blues |
| January 3, 2010 | Dallas | United States | House of Blues |
| January 4, 2010 | Nashville | United States | Ryman Auditorium |
| January 6, 2010 | Washington, D.C. | United States | Warner Theatre |
| January 7, 2010 | New York City | United States | Beacon Theatre |
| January 8, 2010 | New York City | United States | Beacon Theatre |
| January 9, 2010 | Upper Darby Township | United States | Tower Theater |
| January 10, 2010 | Upper Darby Township | United States | Tower Theater |
| January 12, 2010 | Boston | United States | Orpheum Theatre |
| January 13, 2010 | Boston | United States | Orpheum Theatre |
| January 16, 2010 | Detroit | United States | Fox Theatre |
| January 17, 2010 | Rosemont | United States | Rosemont Theatre |
| January 19, 2010 | St. Louis | United States | The Pageant |
| January 20, 2010 | Milwaukee | United States | Eagle's Ballroom |
| January 21, 2010 | Minneapolis | United States | State Theater of Minneapolis |
| January 23, 2010 | Denver | United States | Paramount Theatre |
| January 26, 2010 | Los Angeles | United States | Wiltern Theatre |
| January 27, 2010 | Los Angeles | United States | Wiltern Theatre |
| January 28, 2010 | Los Angeles | United States | Wiltern Theatre |
| January 29, 2010 | Los Angeles | United States | Wiltern Theatre |
| January 30, 2010 | Berkeley | United States | Zellerbach Hall |

Cancellations and rescheduled shows

| January 24, 2010 | Denver | Paramount Theatre | Cancelled due to sickness |
