= Sonny T. =

American bass player

- Born: Sonny Thompson
- Genres: Funk, R&B, pop rock
- Occupations: Vocalist, musician
- Instruments: Bass guitar; keyboards
- Years active: 1972–present
- Label: Hollywood
- Formerly of: New Power Generation, Nick Jonas & The Administration

Sonny T. (born Sonny Thompson) is an American bass player. He was a member of The New Power Generation, Prince's recording and stage band, from 1991–1996.

== Career ==
Sonny T. was a member of the Minneapolis bands Back to Black and The Lewis Connection. Prince played guitar and sang backing vocals on the Sonny T composition "Got To Be Something Here", a recording on The Lewis Connection's self-titled and only album. The track was recorded in late 1976 or early 1977 at Sound 80, while Prince also worked on his own tracks (notably this was Prince's first recording).

In 2000–2006, he recorded and toured with French reed player Michel Portal for his Minneapolis album (Universal France) produced by Jean Rochard. Other members of the group included Michael Bland, Tony Hymas, Vernon Reid and Jef Lee Johnson.

In 2010, Sonny T. became a member of Nick Jonas and the Administration (a project created by Nick Jonas of the Jonas Brothers) along with other former members of the New Power Generation, drummer Michael Bland and keyboardist Tommy Barbarella, as well as bassist and producer John Fields who was also the producer of the Jonas Brothers music.

Starting in 2015, Sonny T. played with Minneapolis artist Alex Rossi.

In 2021, Sonny T. joined Cory Wong's YouTube variety show, Cory and the Wongnotes, playing bass and electric guitar in the backing band, and appearing as a featured guest. He also played bass on Wong's 2021 studio album The Paisley Park Session.
