= Tommy Barbarella =

American keyboardist

- Born: Thomas Elm
- Past members: The New Power Generation; Nick Jonas & the Administration
- Website: www.tommybarbarella.com

Tommy Barbarella (born Thomas Elm) is an American keyboardist. He was a member of The New Power Generation, Prince's recording and stage band, from 1991 to 1996.

== Career ==
Barbarella also played on Miley Cyrus's album Breakout. In 2010, Barbarella became a member of Nick Jonas & the Administration (a side project of Nick Jonas of the Jonas Brothers) along with other former members of The New Power Generation, drummer Michael Bland and bass player Sonny T.

Barbarella has worked as a touring and session keyboardist with artists such as Art Garfunkel, Mavis Staples, Jonny Lang, and the Italian singer Giorgia, contributing to both recordings and live performances. He has also composed and produced music for film and advertising projects, including work on productions directed by Spike Lee, Robert Altman, and Marc Forster. In 2016, Barbarella arranged Prince's song "Purple Rain" for orchestral performance by the Minnesota Orchestra during the halftime show of the Minnesota Vikings' inaugural game at U.S. Bank Stadium.

As of 2026, he is the director of Sundin Music Hall at Hamline University in St. Paul. He also co-wrote a musical theater production based on his own life called The Girl Who Cried Different.
