= Nick Jonas discography =

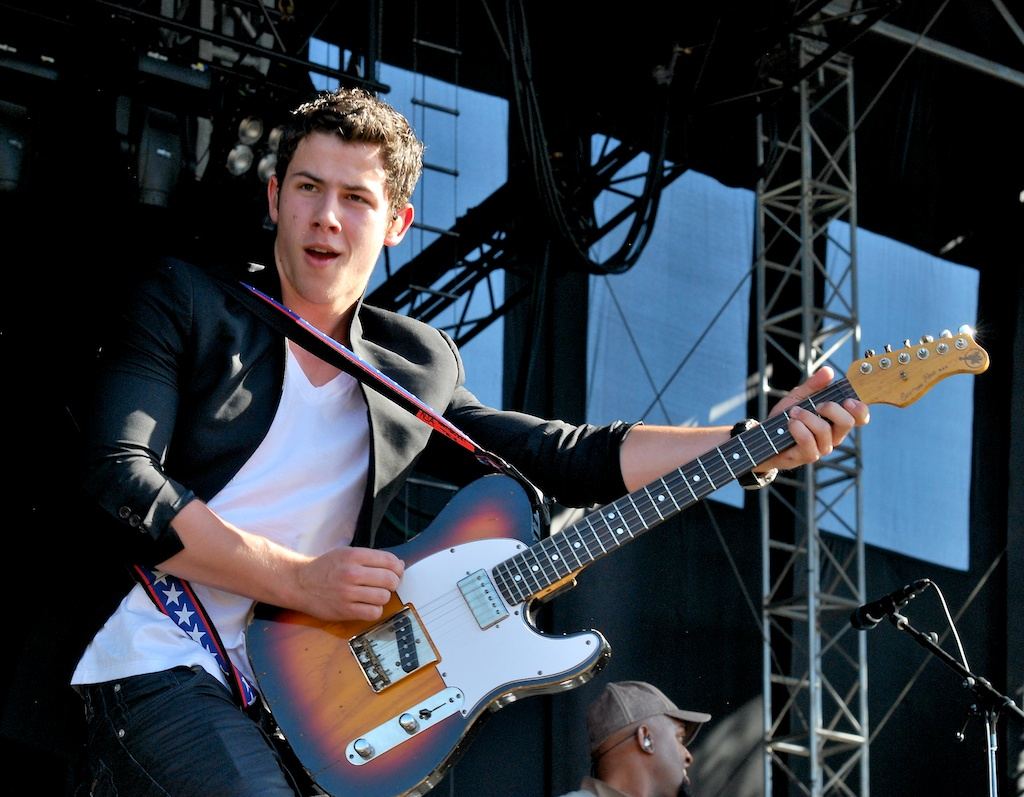
- Jonas at the 2011 Cisco Ottawa Bluesfest
- Studio albums: 5
- Extended plays: 1
- Singles: 27
- Music videos: 17

American singer Nick Jonas has released five studio albums, one extended play (EP), and 27 singles (including four as a featured artist and nine promotional singles). In November 2004, Jonas released his eponymous debut studio album Nicholas Jonas. After serving as a member of the bands the Jonas Brothers and Nick Jonas & the Administration, Jonas returned to his solo career in 2012. On May 8, he released Songs from How to Succeed in Business Without Really Trying, an EP containing songs performed on stage during his Broadway musical of the same name.

On July 24, 2014, Jonas released "Chains" as a promotional single from his second album. The album's first single, "Jealous", was released on September 7, 2014. The song peaked at number 7 on the US Billboard Hot 100, becoming Jonas' highest-charting single in the United States to date, later being certified triple platinum. "Jealous" also peaked at number 2 on the UK Singles Chart. Jonas' second studio album, titled Nick Jonas, was released on November 10, 2014, debuting and peaking at number 6 on the Billboard 200, and remaining 46 weeks on the chart. The aforementioned single "Chains" was re-released to pop radio stations in the US on January 21, 2015, and later peaked at number 13, later receiving a double platinum certification, becoming his second biggest hit in the country. As of August 2015, Nick Jonas had sold 388,000 albums in the United States as a solo artist.

On August 21, 2015, Jonas released "Levels", intended to be the lead single from his third studio album; however, the song was instead included on a re-release of his second album called Nick Jonas X2 on November 20, 2015, alongside a new track called "Area Code" and his song with Sage the Gemini, "Good Thing". "Levels" peaked at number 44 on the Billboard Hot 100, and received a gold certification from the RIAA.

On March 25, 2016, Jonas released the lead single from his third studio album, "Close", featuring vocals by Tove Lo. The single peaked at number 14 on the Billboard Hot 100, becoming his third top 15 there, and also receiving a platinum certification. On June 10, 2016, Jonas released his third studio album, Last Year Was Complicated. The album debuted at number 2 on the Billboard 200. On July 12, Jonas released "Bacon", featuring verses by fellow singer Ty Dolla $ign, as the album's second single.

== Albums ==
=== Studio albums ===
Title	Album details	Peak chart positions									Sales	Certifications
Title	Album details	US	AUS	CAN	DEN	IRE	NOR	NZ	SWE	UK	Sales	Certifications
Nicholas Jonas	Released: November 23, 2004; Formats: CD, digital download; Label: INO, Daylight, Columbia	—	—	—	—	—	—	—	—	—		
Nick Jonas	Released: November 10, 2014; Formats: CD, digital download, streaming; Label: Island	6	40	13	—	57	—	35	—	16	US: 388,000	RMNZ: Gold
Last Year Was Complicated	Released: June 10, 2016; Formats: CD, digital download, streaming; Label: Island, Safehouse	2	13	3	21	26	27	8	45	25		RMNZ: Gold
Spaceman	Released: March 12, 2021; Formats: CD, digital download, streaming; Label: Island	12	—	55	—	—	—	—	—	69		
Sunday Best	Released: February 6, 2026; Formats: CD, digital download; Label: Republic	30	65	—	—	—	—	—	—	— (Note: Sunday Best did not enter the UK Albums Chart, but debuted at number 32 on the UK Albums Sales Chart.)		
"—" denotes releases that did not chart or were not released in that territory.

=== Reissued albums ===
List of reissued albums
Title	Album details
Nick Jonas X2	Released: November 20, 2015 (Europe); Labels: Island, Safehouse; Format: Digital download, streaming
Spaceman (Classics Edition)	Released: March 11, 2021; Label: Island; Format: Digital download, streaming

=== Soundtrack albums ===
List of soundtrack albums
Title	Album details
Power Ballad (with Paul Rudd)	Released: May 31, 2026; Labels: Republic Records; Format: Digital download, streaming

== EPs ==
List of extended plays, with selected chart positions
Title	Extended play details	Peak chart positions
Title	Extended play details	US Cast Album
Songs from How to Succeed in Business Without Really Trying	Released: May 8, 2012; Label: Broadway; Format: CD, digital download, streaming	3

=== Remix EPs ===
List of remix EPs
Title	EP details
Jealous (Remixes)	Released: November 5, 2014; Label: Island, Safehouse; Format: Digital download, streaming
Chains (Remixes)	Released: July 10, 2015; Label: Island, Safehouse; Format: Digital download, streaming
Chains (Dance Remixes)	Released: July 10, 2015; Label: Island, Safehouse; Format: Digital download, streaming
Levels	Released: October 9, 2015; Label: Island, Safehouse; Format: Digital download, streaming

== Singles ==
=== As lead artist ===
Title	Year	Peak chart positions										Certifications	Album
Title	Year	US	US Dance	US Pop	AUS	CAN	DEN	IRE	NZ	SWE	UK	Certifications	Album
"Dear God"	2004	—	—	—	—	—	—	—	—	—	—		Nicholas Jonas
"Joy to the World (A Christmas Prayer)"	2004	—	—	— (Note: "Joy to the World (A Christmas Prayer)" did not enter the US Pop, but peaked at number Fourteen on the Adult Contemporary Singles chart.)	—	—	—	—	—	—	—		Nicholas Jonas
"Chains"	2014	13	1	6	83	27	—	—	—	—	79	RIAA: 2× Platinum; MC: Platinum	Nick Jonas
"Jealous" (solo or featuring Tinashe)	2014	7	1	2	15	10	—	28	8	78	2	RIAA: 3× Platinum; ARIA: Platinum; BPI: Platinum; GLF: Gold; IFPI DEN: Gold; MC: Gold; RMNZ: 3× Platinum	Nick Jonas
"Levels"	2015	44	1	14	79	23	—	—	16	— (Note: "Levels" did not enter the Swedish Singles Chart, but peaked at number 18 on the Swedish Heatseeker chart.)	46	RIAA: Gold; MC: Gold; RMNZ: Platinum	Nick Jonas X2
"Close" (featuring Tove Lo)	2016	14	4	10	37	12	34	33	11	41	25	RIAA: 3× Platinum; BPI: Gold; GLF: Gold; FIMI: Gold; IFPI DEN: Gold; RMNZ: 2× Platinum	Last Year Was; Complicated
"Bacon" (featuring Ty Dolla Sign)	2016	— (Note: "Bacon" did not enter the Billboard Hot 100, but peaked at number 20 on the Bubbling Under Hot 100 chart.)	—	37	—	—	—	—	—	—	—	RIAA: Gold	Last Year Was; Complicated
"Remember I Told You" (featuring Anne-Marie and Mike Posner)	2017	—	10	—	89	96	—	—	— (Note: "Remember I Told You" did not enter the NZ Top 40 Singles Chart, but peaked at number four on the NZ Heatseeker Singles Chart.)	92	97		Non-album singles
"Find You"	2017	— (Note: "Find You" did not enter the Billboard Hot 100, but peaked at number one on the Bubbling Under Hot 100 chart.)	—	34	88	95	—	—	— (Note: "Find You" did not enter the NZ Top 40 Singles Chart, but peaked at number three on the NZ Heatseeker Singles Chart.)	—	— (Note: "Find You" did not enter the UK Singles Chart, but peaked at number 81 on the UK Singles Downloads Chart.)	RMNZ: Gold	Non-album singles
"Anywhere" (with Mustard)	2018	—	—	—	—	—	—	—	—	—	—		Non-album singles
"Right Now" (vs. Robin Schulz)	2018	— (Note: "Right Now" did not enter the US Billboard Hot 100, but peaked at number 14 on the US Billboard Hot Dance/Electronic Songs Chart.)	—	—	—	—	—	99	— (Note: "Right Now" did not enter the NZ Top 40 Singles Chart, but peaked at number 17 on the NZ Hot Singles Chart.)	— (Note: "Right Now" did not enter the Swedish Singellista Chart, but peaked at number one on the Swedish Heatseeker Chart.)	—		Non-album singles
"Spaceman"	2021	— (Note: "Spaceman" did not enter the Billboard Hot 100, but peaked at number 24 on the Bubbling Under Hot 100 chart.)	—	—	—	—	—	—	— (Note: "Spaceman" did not enter the NZ Top 40 Singles Chart, but peaked at number 14 on the NZ Hot Singles Chart.)	—	—		Spaceman
"This Is Heaven"	2021	—	—	—	—	—	—	—	—	—	— (Note: "This Is Heaven" did not enter the UK Singles Chart, but peaked at number 87 on the UK Singles Downloads Chart.)		Spaceman
"Maan Meri Jaan (Afterlife)" (with King)	2023	—	—	—	—	—	—	—	— (Note: "Maan Meri Jaan (Afterlife)" did not enter the NZ Top 40 Singles Chart, but peaked at number 26 on the NZ Hot Singles Chart.)	—	—		Non-album singles
"This Is What Forever Feels Like" (with Jvke)	2024	—	—	—	—	—	—	—	— (Note: "This Is What Forever Feels Like" did not enter the NZ Top 40 Singles Chart, but peaked at number 30 on the NZ Hot Singles Chart.)	—	—		Non-album singles
"Gut Punch"	2026	— (Note: "Gut Punch" did not enter the US Hot 100 but peaked at number 22 on the US Digital Song Sales (Billboard))	—	—	—	—	—	—	— (Note: "Gut Punch" did not enter the NZ Top 40 Singles Chart, but peaked at number 19 on the NZ Hot Singles Chart.)	—	—		Sunday Best
"The Author" (with Brandon Lake)	2026	— (Note: "The Author" did not enter the US Hot 100 but peaked at number 2 on the US Digital Song Sales (Billboard))	—	—	— (Note: "The Author" did not enter the ARIA Charts, but peaked at number 6 on the TCM Australian Christian Airplay chart.)	—	—	—	— (Note: "The Author" did not enter the NZ Top 40 Singles Chart, but peaked at number 35 on the NZ Hot Singles Chart.)	—	— (Note: "The Author" did not enter the UK Singles Chart, but peaked at number 2 on the Cross Rhythms UK Christian Airplay chart.)		Non-album single
"—" denotes releases that did not chart or were not released in that territory.

=== As featured artist ===
Title	Year	Peak chart positions										Album
Title	Year	US	US Pop	AUS	BEL	CAN	IRE	NOR	NZ	SWE	UK	Album
"We Are the World 25 for Haiti" (among Artists for Haiti)	2010	2	—	18	1	7	9	1	8	5	50	Non-album single
"Haven't Met You Yet" (among Smash cast)	2012	—	—	—	—	—	—	—	—	—	—	The Music of Smash
"I Never Met a Wolf Who Didn't Love to Howl" (among Smash cast)	2012	—	—	—	—	—	—	—	—	—	—	Bombshell
"Good Thing" (Sage the Gemini featuring Nick Jonas)	2015	75	32	—	—	—	—	—	—	—	—	Non-album single
"—" denotes releases that did not chart or were not released in that territory.

=== Promotional singles ===
Title	Year	Peak chart positions			Certifications	Album
Title	Year	US Dance	US Pop Digital	US Christ.	Certifications	Album
"Numb" (featuring Angel Haze)	2014	—	45	—		Nick Jonas
"Teacher"	2014	13	—	—		Nick Jonas
"Wilderness"	2014	—	—	—		Nick Jonas
"Area Code"	2015	—	—	—		Nick Jonas X2
"Champagne Problems"	2016	—	35	—		Last Year Was Complicated
"Chainsaw"	2016	—	45	—	RIAA: Gold	Last Year Was Complicated
"Home"	2017	—	—	—		Ferdinand
"You'll Be in My Heart" (with Thunderstorm Artis)	2020	—	—	—		Non-album promotional singles
"Until We Meet Again"	2020	—	—	—		Non-album promotional singles
"Best of You" (with Rachel Mac)	2021	—	—	—		Non-album promotional singles
"Hope" (Remix) (featuring Brandon Lake)	2026	—	—	30		Non-album promotional singles
"—" denotes releases that did not chart or were not released in that territory.

== Other charted songs ==
Title	Year	Peak chart positions										Certifications	Album
Title	Year	US	US Pop Digital	AUT	FRA	CAN	GER	IRE	NZ	SWE	UK	Certifications	Album
"Introducing Me"	2010	92	—	68	—	53	73	32	—	—	51	RIAA: Platinum; BPI: Silver; RMNZ: Gold	Camp Rock 2: The Final Jam
"Under You"	2016	—	49	—	—	—	—	—	— (Note: "Under You" did not enter the NZ Top 40 Singles Chart, but peaked at number 8 on the NZ Heatseekers chart.)	—	—		Last Year Was Complicated
"Bom Bidi Bom" (with Nicki Minaj)	2017	54	7	59	58	69	88	—	— (Note: "Bom Bidi Bom" did not enter the NZ Top 40 Singles Chart, but peaked at number 1 on the NZ Heatseekers chart.)	— (Note: "Bom Bidi Bom" did not enter the Swedish Singles Chart (Sverigetopplistan), but peaked to number 2 on the Sweden Heatseeker Songs.)	87		Fifty Shades Darker
"Say All You Want for Christmas" (with Shania Twain)	2017	—	— (Note: "Say All You Want for Christmas" did not enter the Digital Pop Singles Chart, but peaked at number 7 on the Holiday Digital Song Sales chart.)	—	—	— (Note: "Say All You Want For Christmas" did not enter the Canadian Hot 100, but peaked at number Sixteen on the Canadian Adult Contemporary Singles chart.)	—	—	—	—	—		This Is Christmas
"Selfish" (featuring the Jonas Brothers)	2021	—	—	—	—	—	—	—	— (Note: "Selfish" did not enter the NZ Top 40 Singles Chart, but peaked at number 23 on the NZ Hot Singles Chart.)	—	—		Spaceman
"—" denotes releases that did not chart or were not released in that territory.

== Guest appearances ==
List of non-single guest appearances, showing other artist(s), year released and album name
Title	Year	Other artist(s)	Album
"Crazy Kinda Crush On You"	2005	None	Darcy's Wild Life
"Time for Me to Fly"	2007	None	Aquamarine
"Your Biggest Fan"	2010	China Anne McClain	Jonas L.A.
"Introducing Me"	2010	None	Camp Rock 2: The Final Jam
"What We Came Here For"	2010	Demi Lovato, Joe Jonas; Alyson Stoner, Anna Maria Perez de Taglé	Camp Rock 2: The Final Jam
"This Is Our Song"	2010	Demi Lovato, Joe Jonas, Alyson Stoner	Camp Rock 2: The Final Jam
"Empty Chairs at Empty Tables"	2012	Alfie Boe	Alfie Boe
"Believe"	2015	None	Finding Neverland
"King" (Live from BBC Radio 1's Live Lounge 2015)	2015	None	BBC Radio 1's Live Lounge 2015
"Sunday Morning"	2016	Kevin Hart	Kevin Hart: What Now? (The Mixtape Presents Chocolate Droppa)
"Lush Life" (Live from BBC Radio 1's Live Lounge 2016)	2016	None	BBC Radio 1's Live Lounge 2016
"Bom Bidi Bom"	2017	Nicki Minaj	Fifty Shades Darker
"Home"	2017	None	Ferdinand
"Watch Me"	2017	None	Ferdinand
"Home" (Film Version)	2017	None	Ferdinand
"Say All You Want for Christmas"	2017	Shania Twain	This Is Christmas
"Couldn’t Be Better" (Movie Version)	2019	Kelly Clarkson, UglyDolls Cast	UglyDolls
"Today’s the (Perfect) Day"	2019	UglyDolls Cast	UglyDolls
"The Big Finale"	2019	UglyDolls Cast	UglyDolls
"The Ugly Truth"	2019	None	UglyDolls
"The Uglier Truth"	2019	None	UglyDolls
"Party For Two" (Live From Stagecoach, 2017)	2022	Shania Twain	Come On Over (Special Edition)

== Music videos ==
Music videos
Title	Year	Director(s)	Ref.
As lead artist
"Chains"	2014	Nick Jonas; Ryan Pallotta	
"Jealous"	2014	Peter Tunney; Ryan Pallotta	
"Teacher" (Lyric Video)	2014	Philymack Productions	
"Chains" (The Wynwood Walls edition)	2015	Winwood	
"Levels"	2015	Colin Tilley	
"Area Code"	2015	Black Coffee	
"Close" (featuring Tove Lo)	2016	Tim Erem	
"Chainsaw"	2016	Luke Monaghan	
"Bacon" (featuring Ty dolla $ign)	2016	Black Coffee	
"Under You"	2016	Marc Klasfeld	
"Voodoo"	2016	Black Coffee	
"Champagne Problems"	2016	Colin Tilley	
"Remember I Told You" (featuring Anne-Marie & Mike Posner)	2017	Isaac Rentz	
"Find You"	2017	Emil Nava	
"Home"	2017	—N/a	
"Jumanji Jumanji" (with Jack Black)	2017	—N/a	
"Anywhere" (with Mustard)	2018	—N/a	
"Anywhere"(EDC Vegas) - Vertical video (with Mustard)	2018	—N/a	
"Right Now" (with Robin Schulz)	2018	—N/a	
"Until We Meet Again"	2020	—N/a	
"Spaceman"	2021	Anthony Mandler	
"This Is Heaven"	2021	Daniel Broadley	
As featured artist
"Good Thing" (Sage the Gemini)	2016	Hannah Lux Davis	
Guest appearances
"We Are the World 25 for Haiti" (with Artists for Hati)	2010	Paul Haggis	
"My Time" (Gabrielle Giguere)	2011	—N/a	
"OXO" (Lyric Video) (Olivia Somerlyn)	2015	—N/a	
"Do Me Right" (Mr. Fantasy)	2026	John	
