= Lauren Holt =

American actress and comedian

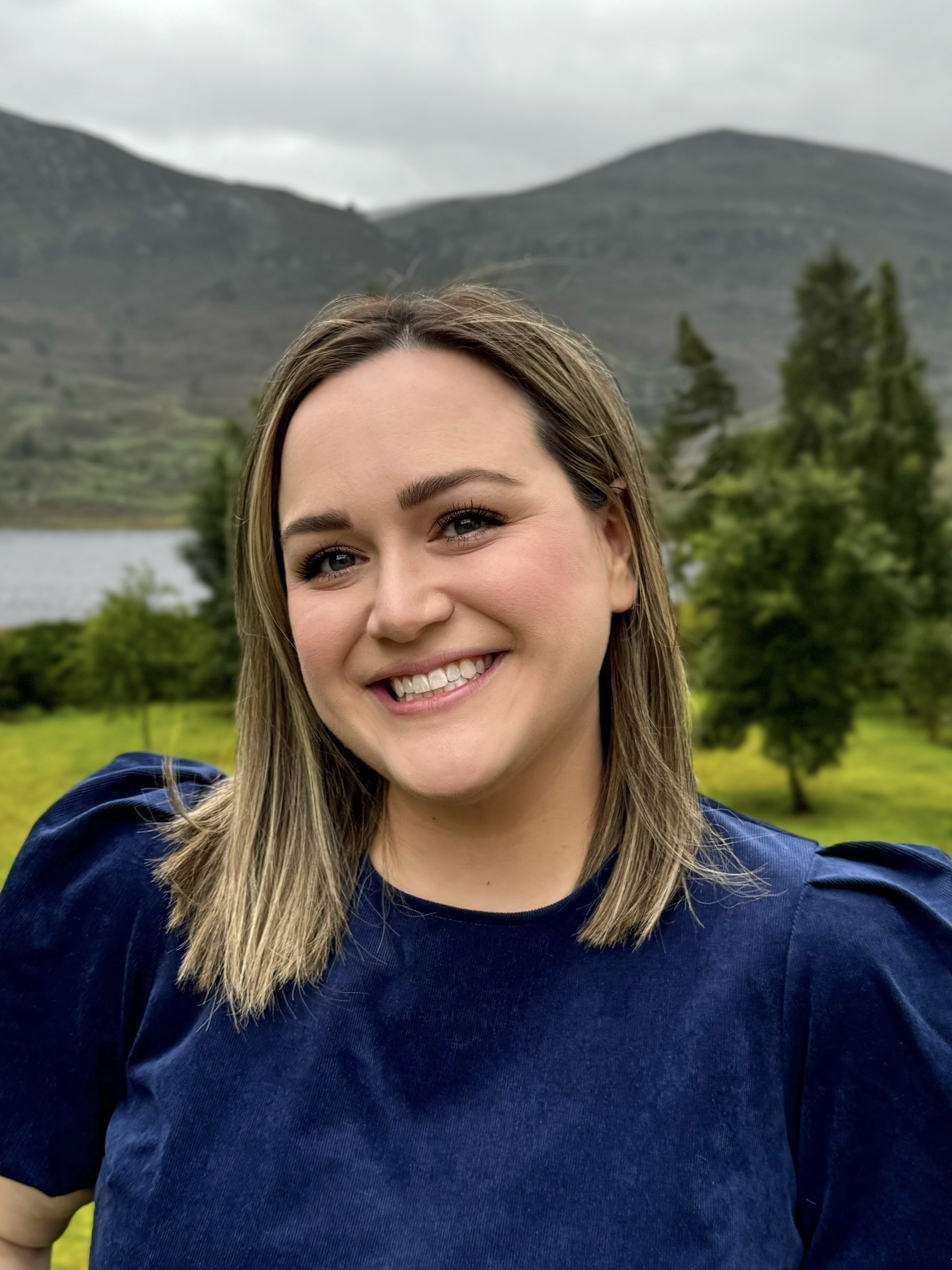
- Holt in 2024
- Born: Charlotte, North Carolina, U.S.
- Education: University of North Carolina at Greensboro (BFA)
- Occupations: Actress; comedian
- Years active: 2015–present

Lauren Holt is an American actress and comedian. She began her career with the Upright Citizens Brigade, an improv and sketch comedy troupe in Los Angeles. In 2020, Holt, alongside Andrew Dismukes and Punkie Johnson, was hired to join the cast of the NBC sketch comedy series Saturday Night Live as a featured player, appearing during the show's 46th season between 2020 and 2021. Holt left Saturday Night Live after one season and went on to appear in Greta Gerwig's Barbie, Nicholas Stoller's You're Cordially Invited, and Pixar's Dream Productions. She is a recurring cast member on HBO's comedy series I Love LA.

== Early life ==
Holt was born and raised in Charlotte, North Carolina, and is the daughter of Lyn Holt and Harris Holt, an artist and business owner. She was raised Episcopalian and worked as a camp counselor at HUGS Camp, a summer camp run by the Episcopal Diocese of North Carolina for people with disabilities.

Holt graduated from Myers Park High School in 2009. She attended the University of North Carolina at Greensboro, where she was a member of Sigma Sigma Sigma, graduating with a Bachelor of Fine Arts Degree in studio art in 2013.

== Career ==
Holt began her career as a member of the Upright Citizens Brigade in Los Angeles. With the group, Holt was a founding member of a musical improv troupe The Pickup. In 2015, she appeared in the music video for the song "Til It Happens to You" by Lady Gaga.

In 2018, Holt starred in the short film Parent Teacher Conference, for which she was nominated for Best Actress at the Atlanta Comedy Film Festival.

On December 1, 2020, Holt was listed in Forbes 30 Under 30.

In 2020, Holt was cast as a featured player on Saturday Night Live in its forty-sixth season. She left the cast of Saturday Night Live after the end of the season.

In 2023, Holt appeared in the American animated horror film Pastacolypse and the American fantasy comedy film Barbie.

Holt voiced the character Teenage Riley in the Disney+ 2024 television miniseries Dream Productions.

== Filmography ==
Lauren Holt film and television work
Year	Title	Role	Notes
2015	Til It Happens to You	Lauren	Music video
2017	Open Houses	Engagement Party Guest	Episode: "The Happy Couple"
2017	Los Paradise: Tell You How I Feel	Prospector's Wife	Short film
2017	Keep Calm and Tampon	Todd / Gina / Taint	Short film
2018	Parent Teacher Conference	Mrs. Brooks	Short film
2018	Strange Beverly	Teacher	Short film
2018	Hunky-Dory Soda Pop!	Lauren	Short film
2019	The Filth	Lydia	3 episodes
2019	Hypocrite	Vivian	Television film
2020	It Listens from the Radio	Sandy	Episode: "Father's Office"
2020–2021	Saturday Night Live	Various characters	Featured cast member
2022	Aqua Teen Forever: Plantasm	Liz	Direct-to-video film
2023	Pastacolypse	Emma Manicotti	Direct-to-video film
2023	The Sperm Bank	Kit Christian	Short film
2023	Barbie	Time Mom	Feature film
2024	Dream Productions	Teen Riley	2 episodes
2025	You're Cordially Invited	Abigail	Feature film
2025	I Love LA	Courtney	Recurring role
2026	The Comeback	Willa	Episode: "Valerie's Home Alone"
TBA	Thud †		Post-production
