= Don't Give Up on Us =

Don't Give Up on Us may refer to:

- Don't Give Up on Us (film), a 2006 Filipino romantic comedy film
- "Don't Give Up on Us" (song), a 1976 song by David Soul
- "Don't Give Up on Us", a 2021 song by Nick Jonas from Spaceman
