= Saturday Night Live season 46 =

Season of television series

Saturday Night Live
- Season 46
- No. of episodes: 20

Release
- Original network: NBC
- Original release: October 3, 2020 – May 22, 2021

Season chronology
- ← Previous season 45 Next → season 47

The forty-sixth season of the NBC sketch comedy series Saturday Night Live premiered on October 3, 2020, during the 2020–21 television season with host Chris Rock and musical guest Megan Thee Stallion, and concluded on May 22, 2021, with host Anya Taylor-Joy and musical guest Lil Nas X. With the previous season cut short amid the COVID-19 pandemic and the show instead airing three remotely produced episodes referred to as Saturday Night Live at Home, the season premiere marked the return to Studio 8H at 30 Rockefeller Plaza in New York City. Lorne Michaels said that the show aimed to have a "limited" in-studio audience, and that they would "work closely with Gov. Cuomo's team." In the season, the series reached a milestone: airing its 900th episode, on February 6, 2021, with host Dan Levy and musical guest Phoebe Bridgers.

== Cast ==
On September 15, 2020, it was announced that the entire cast from last season would be returning, with Ego Nwodim, who had been a featured player since 2018, being promoted to repertory status, while Chloe Fineman and Bowen Yang, both of whom had been hired in 2019 for the previous season, remained as featured players.

On September 16, prior to the start of the season, SNL staff writer/stand-up comic Andrew Dismukes, Upright Citizens Brigade alum Lauren Holt, and stand-up comedian Punkie Johnson were added to the cast as featured players. The same day of Dismukes, Holt, and Johnson's additions to the cast, it was announced that Alec Baldwin and SNL alum Maya Rudolph, though not members of the cast, would reprise their respective roles as Donald Trump and Kamala Harris, while Jim Carrey would take over impersonating Joe Biden. Biden had been portrayed by Jason Sudeikis while he was vice president and by Woody Harrelson, John Mulaney, and Sudeikis the previous season. On December 19, Carrey announced he would step down from playing Biden, stating it was the original intention that he would play Biden for only six weeks. Current cast member Alex Moffat succeeded Carrey to portray as Biden during the cold open of the episode hosted by Kristen Wiig.

Cecily Strong was absent from the first six episodes of the season due to filming commitments for her Apple TV+ series Schmigadoon!. Aidy Bryant appeared in the season premiere before taking an extended absence due to filming commitments for her Hulu show Shrill. Both Strong and Bryant were still credited as cast members throughout the season.

This was the final season for longtime cast member Beck Bennett, who had been on the show for eight seasons since 2013, and the only season for Holt, who departed after the season finale.

=== Cast roster ===
**Repertory players**

- Beck Bennett
- Aidy Bryant
- **Michael Che**
- Pete Davidson
- Mikey Day
- Heidi Gardner
- **Colin Jost**
- Kate McKinnon
- Alex Moffat
- Kyle Mooney
- Ego Nwodim
- Chris Redd
- Cecily Strong
- Kenan Thompson
- Melissa Villaseñor

**Featured players**

- Andrew Dismukes
- Chloe Fineman
- Lauren Holt
- Punkie Johnson
- Bowen Yang

bold denotes "Weekend Update" anchor

== Writers ==
Prior to the start of the season, writing supervisor Anna Drezen (who joined the writing staff in 2016) was promoted to co-head writer alongside Michael Che, Colin Jost, and Kent Sublette, making her the first female head writer since Sarah Schneider. Additionally, Celeste Yim was added to the writing staff.

This would be the final season for longtime writing supervisors Fran Gillespie and Sudi Green (who both joined the writing staff in 2015) after six years (they had both also previously spent four years as writing supervisors, starting in 2017). Green later returned to the show for the first 7 episodes of season 50.

Following the conclusion of the first half of the season, writer Sam Jay left the show (who joined the writing staff in 2017). Writers Dan Licata and Emma Clark (who both joined the writing staff in 2019) left the show following the season's conclusion. Writer Gary Richardson did not return for the next season, but would return in season 48.

== Episodes ==
No. overall	No. in season	Host	Musical guest	Original release date	Ratings/ Share
890	1	Chris Rock	Megan Thee Stallion	October 3, 2020	5.6
Megan Thee Stallion performs "Savage" with pre-recorded vocals from Beyoncé, Malcolm X and Tamika Mallory, and "Don't Stop" with Young Thug.; Stallion also appears in the pre-recorded "Bottom of Your Face" and "NBA Bubble Draft".; In the cold open: Alec Baldwin appears as Donald Trump, Jim Carrey appears as Joe Biden, Maya Rudolph appears as Kamala Harris, and Harry Styles appears as himself, though the latter appears via pre-recorded footage. Rudolph also appears in "NBA Bubble Draft".; The cold open generated controversy among conservatives who claimed that it was inappropriate to satirize Trump while he was hospitalized. Baldwin defended his portrayal of Trump saying that based on news released by the White House, Trump was not gravely ill, and that the satire was about Trump's debate performance, not about his illness.; The episode pays tribute to Ruth Bader Ginsburg, who died two weeks prior, with McKinnon portraying Justice Ginsburg silently sitting in the audience at the end of Weekend Update, followed by a card honoring the late justice.; Maddie Rice debuts as a member of the Saturday Night Live Band and appears in a commercial bumper performing a guitar solo during the final commercial break.; Andrew Dismukes, Lauren Holt and Punkie Johnson's first episode as cast members.; This episode marks the show's return to Studio 8H since the beginning of the COVID-19 pandemic.
891	2	Bill Burr	Jack White (Note: Morgan Wallen's scheduled appearance as the musical guest was cancelled the week of the episode after videos surfaced showing him violating the show's COVID-19 protocols on mask wearing and social distancing. White was announced as a replacement the day before the broadcast. Wallen was later rescheduled for the December 5 episode.)	October 10, 2020 (Note: The episode was broadcast as planned in spite of an employee at 30 Rockefeller Plaza having tested positive for COVID-19 on air day.)	4.7
Jack White performs a medley of "Don't Hurt Yourself", "Ball and Biscuit" and Blind Willie Johnson's "Jesus is Coming Soon" for his first set and "Lazaretto" for his second.; Jim Carrey and Maya Rudolph appear in the cold open. Rudolph portrays Kamala Harris and Carrey portrays Joe Biden, Jeff Goldblum, and Seth Brundle, Goldblum's character from the 1986 film The Fly.; Jason Momoa appears in the pre-recorded "Enough is Enough" sketch.; The episode pays multiple tributes to Eddie Van Halen, who had died earlier in the week: footage of him performing with the Saturday Night Live Band from season 12 is shown before the goodnights, White uses a guitar designed especially for him by Van Halen during his performance of "Lazaretto", and Burr wears a Van Halen shirt during the goodnights.
892	3	Issa Rae	Justin Bieber	October 17, 2020	4.5
Justin Bieber performs "Holy" with Chance the Rapper and "Lonely" with Benny Blanco on keyboard. Bieber and Chance also appear in Kyle Mooney's pre-recorded "Dancer" sketch.; Alec Baldwin, Jim Carrey, and Maya Rudolph appear as Donald Trump, Joe Biden, and Kamala Harris, respectively, in the cold open. Rudolph also appears in "Your Voice Chicago", in a parody of Diamond and Silk
893	4	Adele	H.E.R.	October 24, 2020	5.0
H.E.R. performs "Damage" and "Hold On".; Alec Baldwin, Jim Carrey, and Maya Rudolph appear in the "Final Presidential Debate" cold open as Donald Trump, Joe Biden, and Kristen Welker, respectively. Rudolph also appears in the "Visiting Grandma" sketch and the pre-recorded "Ass Angel Jeans" sketch.
894	5	John Mulaney	The Strokes	October 31, 2020	4.7
The Strokes perform "The Adults Are Talking" and "Bad Decisions".; Jim Carrey and Maya Rudolph appear in the cold open as Joe Biden and Kamala Harris, respectively. Rudolph also appears as the Statue of Liberty in "New York Musical" sketch.
895	6	Dave Chappelle (Note: Chappelle hosted the first episode immediately following the presidential election. He also hosted the first episode immediately following the 2016 presidential election.)	Foo Fighters	November 7, 2020 (Note: The episode was delayed due to a Clemson vs. Notre Dame college football game that went into double overtime.)	9.1 million
The Foo Fighters perform "Shame Shame" and "Times Like These".; Alec Baldwin, Jim Carrey, and Maya Rudolph appear in the cold open as Donald Trump, Joe Biden, and Kamala Harris, respectively. Baldwin also makes a vocal cameo as Trump in "DC Morning", and he and Rudolph appear in "Uncle Ben" sketch, with Rudolph appearing as Aunt Jemima.; A rerun that aired on September 18, 2021 paid tribute to former cast member and Weekend Update anchor Norm Macdonald, who died earlier in the week.
896	7	Jason Bateman	Morgan Wallen	December 5, 2020	6.1 million
Morgan Wallen performs "7 Summers" and "Still Goin' Down" and appears in "Morgan Wallen Party", a sketch parodying the events leading up to the cancellation of his appearance in the second episode of the season.; Eminem appears in the pre-recorded "Stu" sketch, which itself parodied his song "Stan".; Cecily Strong returns after not appearing on the first six episodes of the season.; The January 16, 2021 repeat of this episode featured a clip of former band member Howard Johnson, who had died earlier in the week, performing with his band Gravity in 1978.
897	8	Timothée Chalamet	Bruce Springsteen & the E Street Band	December 12, 2020	6.7 million
Bruce Springsteen & the E Street Band perform "Ghosts" and "I'll See You in My Dreams"; E Street Band bassist Garry Tallent elects not to perform due to COVID-19 concerns. He is replaced by Jack Daley of Little Steven's Disciples of Soul band. This is the first performance by the E Street Band without Tallent since the band's inception in 1973.; Chalamet's mother, Nicole Flender, appears in the opening monologue.; Jimmy Fallon appears in the pre-recorded "Tiny Horse" sketch.; Questlove appears in the "XXL Rap Roundtable" sketch.; During the goodnights, Chalamet wore a hoodie with the Legendary Pictures logo on it, in response to the news that Dune, which he starred in and was produced by Legendary but distributed by Warner Bros., would be released simultaneously in theaters and on HBO Max.
898	9	Kristen Wiig	Dua Lipa	December 19, 2020	6.3 million
Dua Lipa performs "Don't Start Now" and "Levitating" and appears in the "U.S.O. Performance" sketch.; Maya Rudolph appears in the cold open as Kamala Harris, and appears in the opening monologue.
899	10	John Krasinski	Machine Gun Kelly	January 30, 2021	4.4
Machine Gun Kelly performs "my ex's best friend" and "Lonely".; Before the goodnights, a photo of Cicely Tyson, who died two days before the episode aired, is shown in silence.
900	11	Dan Levy	Phoebe Bridgers	February 6, 2021	4.2
Phoebe Bridgers performs "Kyoto" and "I Know the End".; Levy's father, Eugene Levy, appears in the opening monologue.
901	12	Regina King	Nathaniel Rateliff	February 13, 2021	4.1
Nathaniel Rateliff performs "Redemption" and "A Little Honey" with the Night Sweats.
902	13	Regé-Jean Page	Bad Bunny	February 20, 2021	4.2
Bad Bunny performs "La Noche de Anoche" with Rosalía and "Te Deseo Lo Mejor" and appears in the pre-recorded "Loco" sketch and in the live-recorded "Sea Shanty" sketch.
903	14	Nick Jonas	Nick Jonas	February 27, 2021	4.1
Nick Jonas performs "Spaceman" and "This is Heaven" with SNL bandleader Lenny Pickett on saxophone.; Nick's brother Kevin Jonas appears in the opening monologue and introduces Nick's second performance.; Kenan Thompson and Chris Redd introduce Nick's first performance.
904	15	Maya Rudolph	Jack Harlow	March 27, 2021	3.6
Jack Harlow performs a medley of "Tyler Herro" and "Whats Poppin" for his first set and "Same Guy" with Adam Levine for his second set. He also appears in the pre-recorded "NFTs".; Martin Short appears as Doug Emhoff in "Kamala Harris Unity Seder" sketch.; Tina Fey and Rachel Dratch appear in the pre-recorded "The Maya-ing" sketch.
905	16	Daniel Kaluuya	St. Vincent	April 3, 2021	3.6
St. Vincent performs "Pay Your Way in Pain" and "The Melting of the Sun".
906	17	Carey Mulligan	Kid Cudi	April 10, 2021	3.6
Kid Cudi performs "Tequila Shots" and "Sad People" and appears in the pre-recorded "Weird Little Flute" sketch.; Mulligan's husband, Marcus Mumford, appears in the opening monologue.; Timothée Chalamet appears in the pre-recorded "Weird Little Flute" sketch.; After Update, a photo of Anne Beatts, a longtime SNL writer who died earlier in the week, was shown in silence.; Before the goodnights, a photo of rapper DMX, who died the day before, is shown in silence.
907	18	Elon Musk	Miley Cyrus	May 8, 2021	4.7
Miley Cyrus performs "Without You" with The Kid Laroi and "Plastic Hearts", appears in the cold open singing "Light of a Clear Blue Morning" originally performed by her godmother, Dolly Parton, and appears in the pre-recorded "Chad on Mars" sketch. Cyrus' mother Tish Cyrus also appears in the cold open.; The mothers of the cast (excluding Michael Che, Alex Moffat, and Andrew Dismukes) appear in the cold open.; Musk's mother Maye Musk appears in the opening monologue.; Grimes, Musk's then partner, appears as Princess Peach in the Wario trial sketch.; For the first time in the series, this episode was live-streamed internationally on YouTube to over 100 countries.
908	19	Keegan-Michael Key	Olivia Rodrigo	May 15, 2021	3.5
Olivia Rodrigo performs "Drivers License" and "Good 4 U", with both performances accompanied by Dan Nigro playing guitar.; SNL writer Steven Castillo appears during the opening monologue as an audience member.; SNL writer Gary Richardson appears in the "High School Graduation" sketch.
909	20	Anya Taylor-Joy	Lil Nas X	May 22, 2021	3.5
Lil Nas X performs "Montero (Call Me by Your Name)" and "Sun Goes Down" and appears in the pre-recorded "It's Pride Again" sketch.; Chris Rock and long time production designer Akira Yoshimura appear in the cold open.; After Update, a picture of Charles Grodin, who died earlier in the week, is shown.; SNL writer Celeste Yim appears in the pre-recorded “It’s Pride Again” sketch.; Beck Bennett and Lauren Holt's final episode as cast members.

== Specials ==
Title	Original release date	Ratings/ Share
"The 2020 SNL Election Special"	November 2, 2020	N/A
A special showing of all fan-favorite SNL political sketches.
