= This Is What Forever Feels Like =

2024 single by Jvke and Nick Jonas

Single by Jvke and Nick Jonas
- Released: September 13, 2024
- Label: Republic
- Songwriters: Andrew Fortier; Jake Lawson; Zac Lawson
- Producers: Jvke; ZVC

Jvke singles chronology
"Her" (2024)	"This Is What Forever Feels Like" (2024)	"Next to You" (2024)

Nick Jonas singles chronology
"Maan Meri Jaan (Afterlife)" (2024)	"This Is What Forever Feels Like" (2024)	"Gut Punch" (2026)

Lyric video
- "This Is What Forever Feels Like" on YouTube

"This Is What Forever Feels Like" is a song by the American singer-songwriters Jvke and Nick Jonas. It was released on September 13, 2024, through Republic Records. It was written by Jvke, Zac Lawson and Andrew Fortier. The production was also handled by Jvke along with ZVC.

== Production ==
The producution process of the song came along quickly, with Jvke commenting: "this song came together so easily. it kind of just poured out. love is such a driving force in my art and my life, and this song was inspired by my dreams of finding my forever love, and my guess is that it resonated with Nick because he has found his".

Jonas also commented: "I’ve been a fan of JVKE’s since I first heard ‘Golden Hour’. He and I had a great time working together. This song captures the joy of being with your partner and spending your lives together".

== Release ==
"This Is What Forever Feels Like" was released on September 13, 2024, through Republic Records. The song is a part of Jvke's "this is what ___ feels like" collection of songs.

== Commercial performance ==
Within its first charting week, "This Is What Forever Feels Like" peaked at number 30 on the Recorded Music NZ Hot Singles Chart.

== Live performance ==
The song, along with "Golden Hour" and "Her", were performed by Jvke and the Jonas Brothers during the Jonas20: Greetings from Your Hometown Tour, on November 20, 2025, in Providence, Rhode Island.

== Charts ==
Weekly chart performance for "This Is What Forever Feels Like"
Chart (2024)	Peak position
New Zealand Hot Singles (RMNZ)	30
