= This Is What Christmas Feels Like =

Studio album by Jvke and Forrest Frank
- Released: December 5, 2025
- Genre: Christmas
- Length: 22:11
- Label: JVKE; AWAL
- Producer: Jake Lawson; Zac Lawson; Frank

Jvke chronology
This Is What Feels Like (Vol. 1–4) (2022)	This Is What Christmas Feels Like (2025)

Forrest Frank chronology
Jesus Lofi Volume Two (2025)	This Is What Christmas Feels Like (2025)	Jesus Is Alive (Vol. 1) (2026)

This Is What Christmas Feels Like (stylized in all lowercase) is a collaborative Christmas album between Jvke and Forrest Frank. The album was released on December 5, 2025, via JVKE Music and AWAL. The album was both written and produced by Jake Lawson, Zac Lawson, and Frank. It features a guest appearance from Z. Lawson.

This Is What Christmas Feels Like was supported by the release of three promotional singles, "Christmas Morning" on November 14, "Her" on December 12, and "This Is What a New Year Feels Like" on December 19, 2025. "Christmas Morning" peaked at number 10 on the Billboard Hot Christian Songs chart, "Her" peaked at number 30, and "This Is What a New Year Feels Like" peaked at number 25 on the chart. The album peaked at number 7 on the Top Christian Albums chart and number 44 on the Top Holiday Albums chart.

== Writing and development ==
This Is What Christmas Feels Like contains six previously unreleased tracks, a Christmas-themed remix of Jvke's hit song "Her", and an interlude, "The Countdown". It demonstrates the genre of holiday music. Jvke spoke on the album, saying:

There's nothing quite like the feeling of Christmas. Creating this album felt like a gift in and of itself.

— Jvke

== Release and promotion ==
"Christmas Morning" was released as a promotional single on November 14, 2025, after teasers being made to social media. At the end of the song, there was speech announcing that the full album, This Is What Christmas Feels Like, was scheduled for upcoming release. "Christmas Morning" was also supported by a lyric video, which was released to YouTube. Frank teased several songs to social media, saying that fans in the comments would help him choose which one of them to release on December 5. However, instead of releasing a single track, he released the entire album that day. The album's title track, "This Is What Christmas Feels Like", was supported by a lyric video. A lyric video for "Her" was later released on December 16, a lyric video for "This Is What a New Year Feels Like" was released on December 17, and a lyric video for "CHRISTmas" was released on December 18, 2025.

== Reception ==
Professional ratings
Review scores
Source	Rating
New Release Today	4/5 stars

=== Critical ===
Clive Banda of Worship Chronicle described the album to be a "warm, faith-forward soundtrack for the holiday season" that "mixes nostalgic holiday sounds with cinematic arrangements and clear expressions of faith". He stated that, overall, it is "a modern Christmas album" that feels "familiar and fresh at the same time". Jessica Nicholson of Billboard labelled the album as a standout release from 2025. In a four-out-of-five star review for New Release Today, Josiah Scott praised the album's "element variation," particularly "the use of stringed instruments and other background sound effects." However, he criticized the album's short length, and named several instances which he considered to "disrupt the album's flow". Overall, he labelled This is What Christmas Feels Like as "a stellar attempt with spectacularly mature production."

=== Commercial ===
"Christmas Morning" debuted at number 37 on the Billboard Hot Christian Songs chart. It later peaked at its peak position of number 10. With the release of the album, eight album tracks entered the chart, including "This Is What Christmas Feels Like" at number 14, "Christmas Through Your Eyes" at number 17, "CHRISTmas" at number 16, "Shine Your Light" at number 21, "The Cozy Part" at number 29, "Her" at number 30, and "This Is What a New Year Feels Like" at number 25. The album itself debuted at its peak of number 7 on the Top Christian Albums chart and number 44 on the Top Holiday Albums chart.

== Track listing ==
All tracks are written and produced by Jake Lawson, Zac Lawson, and Forrest Frank.

No.	Title	Length
1.	"This Is What Christmas Feels Like"	2:48
2.	"Christmas Through Your Eyes" (featuring Zac Lawson)	2:51
3.	"Christmas Morning"	2:10
4.	"Shine Your Light"	2:20
5.	"The Cozy Part"	2:27
6.	"CHRISTmas"	3:58
7.	"Her"	2:22
8.	"The Countdown" (interlude)	0:34
9.	"This Is What a New Year Feels Like"	2:41
Total length:		22:11

== Personnel ==
Credits adapted from Tidal Music.

- Forrest Frank – producer, lead vocals
- Jake Lawson – producer, lead vocals
- Zac Lawson – producer

== Charts ==
Chart performance for This Is What Christmas Feels Like
Chart (2025)	Peak position
US Top Christian Albums (Billboard)	7
US Top Holiday Albums (Billboard)	44
