= Christmas Morning (song) =

Promotional single by Jvke and Forrest Frank

from the album This Is What Christmas Feels Like
- Released: November 14, 2025
- Genre: Hip-hop
- Length: 2:10
- Label: JVKE; AWAL
- Songwriters: Frank; Jake Lawson
- Producers: Frank; J. Lawson; Zac Lawson

Music video
- "Christmas Morning" on YouTube

"Christmas Morning" is a song recorded by American singers Jvke and Forrest Frank as the first promotional single for their 2025 collaborative Christmas album, This Is What Christmas Feels Like. The song was released on November 14, 2025, via JVKE Music and AWAL.

== Release and promotion ==
"Christmas Morning" was released as a promotional single on November 14, 2025, after teasers being made to social media. Upon release, it was supported with a lyric video, which was uploaded to YouTube. The song appeared as the third track on This Is What Christmas Feels Like.

== Writing and development ==
"This Is What Christmas Feels Like" was both written and produced by Frank, Jvke, and Zac Lawson. Frank and Jvke both recorded lead vocals to the song. At the end of the song, there was speech announcing that the full album, This Is What Christmas Feels Like, was scheduled for upcoming release. Running for a duration of two minutes and ten seconds, the song is composed in the key of E, with a speed of 120 beats per minute and a time signature of 4/4.

Josiah Scott of The Christian Beat observed that the song uses a "steady hip hop beat with Frank rapping over the backdrop of bells and orchestral strings, while JVKE joins in later in the song."

== Commercial performance ==
"Christmas Morning" made its debut on the chart week dated for November 29, 2025, when it debuted at No. 37 on the Billboard Hot Christian Songs chart. Within four weeks on the chart, the song reached its peak position of No. 10 on the chart.

== Personnel ==
Credits adapted from Tidal Music.

- Forrest Frank – producer, writer, lead vocals,
- Jake Lawson – producer, writer, lead vocals
- Zac Lawson – producer, writer

== Charts ==
Chart performance for "Christmas Morning"
Chart (2025)	Peak position
US Hot Christian Songs (Billboard)	10
