= This Is What Christmas Feels Like (song) =

Song by Jvke and Forrest Frank

from the album This Is What Christmas Feels Like
- Released: December 5, 2025
- Length: 2:48
- Label: JVKE Music; AWAL Recordings America
- Songwriters: Frank; Jake Lawson
- Producers: Frank; J. Lawson; Zac Lawson

Music video
- "This Is What Christmas Feels Like" on YouTube

"This Is What Christmas Feels Like" is a song recorded by American singers Jvke and Forrest Frank as the title and opening track for their 2025 collaborative Christmas album, This Is What Christmas Feels Like. The song was officially released on December 5, 2025, via JVKE Music and AWAL Recordings America.

== Release and promotion ==
Predating the release of the full album, Frank teased "This is What Christmas Feels Like" to social media, alongside several other tracks which would later appear on the album. He anticipated releasing one of the songs as a single that Friday. However, instead of releasing a single track, he released the entire album that day. "This Is What Christmas Feels Like" initially appeared as the opening track and title track to that album. Upon release, the song was supported by the release of a lyric video, which was uploaded to YouTube.

== Writing and development ==
"This Is What Christmas Feels Like" was written by Frank and Jvke, while Frank, Jvke, and Zac Lawson, who is Jvke's older brother, produced. Frank and Jvke both recorded lead vocals to the song. Running for a duration of two minutes and forty-eight minutes, the song is composed in the key of E♭, with a speed of 67 beats per minute and a time signature of 4/4.

== Commercial performance ==
WIthin the chart week dated for December 20, 2025, "This Is What Christmas Feels Like" debuted at its peak position of No. 14 on the Billboard Hot Christian Songs chart.

== Personnel ==
Credits adapted from Tidal Music.

- Forrest Frank – producer, writer, lead vocals
- Jake Lawson – producer, writer, lead vocals
- Zac Lawson – producer, writer

== Charts ==
Chart performance for "This Is What Christmas Feels Like"
Chart (2025)	Peak position
UK Christian Songs (Cross Rhythms)	10
US Hot Christian Songs (Billboard)	14
