= Mozella =

American singer-songwriter

- Born: Maureen Anne McDonald; May 13, 1981 (age 45)
- Origin: Detroit, Michigan, U.S.
- Genres: Pop
- Occupations: Songwriter; singer
- Years active: 2006–present
- Website: mozellamusic.com

Maureen Anne McDonald (born May 13, 1981), better known as Mozella, is an American songwriter and singer. Along with her album releases, Mozella co-wrote Miley Cyrus' 2013 single "Wrecking Ball", which peaked atop the Billboard Hot 100. She has also co-written Charlie Puth's 2015 single "One Call Away", as well as One Direction's "Perfect" that same year.

Some of Mozella's other co-writes include the songs, "I Believe", "Strangers", "Every Single Time, and "Don't Throw It Away" for the Jonas Brothers' album Happiness Begins (2019), "Drop Top" and "Horses" on Keith Urban's Graffiti U album, Pink’s "Cover Me In Sunshine", Kelly Clarkson's 2017 single "Love So Soft", "One Call Away" by Charlie Puth, "Fool's Gold" and "Perfect" by One Direction, "Bright" by Echosmith, Ellie Goulding's "Don't Panic", "Holding on for Life", and "We Can't Move to This" from Goulding's album Delirium (co-wrote with Goulding and Greg Kurstin), "Feels Like Vegas" with Tinashe, and "Take You High" off Kelly Clarkson's 2015 album, Piece by Piece. Madonna and Mozella co-wrote eleven of the nineteen tracks on the album Rebel Heart, including the single "Living for Love" with Diplo, Ariel Rechtshaid, and Toby Gad.

In the genres of film, television and theater, she co-wrote "A Little Party Never Killed Nobody" with Goonrock and Fergie for Baz Luhrmann's The Great Gatsby. In early 2014 she continued her work with Baz Luhrmann, penning "A Beautiful Surprise" with David Foster for Luhrmann's musical theater adaptation of his cult classic film Strictly Ballroom. She also co-wrote "Dancing in the Dark" by Rihanna for the DreamWorks animated movie Home, in 2015.

Mozella's song "Anything is Possible" is used in the 2018 L’Oreal El Vive commercials. Her song "Love Is Something" was used in the 2015 McDonald's "Archenemies" television campaign. Beginning April 2015, Chase Bank used her song "Can't Get Enough" for their new commercials in the US. Some of the brands that have used Mozella's music in their branding include Chrysler, Verizon, Microsoft, Mercedes-Benz, and JC Penney.

Mozella has released three full-length albums, I Will (Warner/Maverick, 2006), Belle Isle (Universal/Motown, 2009), and The Brian Holland Sessions (Belle Isle Records, 2012), as well as three EPs, Mozella (Warner/Maverick, 2005), The Straits (Universal/Motown, 2009) and The Love (Universal/Motown, 2010).

== Early life ==
Mozella was raised in Detroit, Michigan, where she got her start as a performer booking her own gigs in coffee houses at age 15. Early on, she collaborated with artists such as Warren G, and in 2002 was invited to England to write and record with Tim Saul, producer for Portishead. Upon her return to Los Angeles, she signed with Maverick Records to record her first EP and album.

== Music career ==
=== Warner/Maverick Records ===
Mozella signed to Madonna’s Maverick Records in July 2003. In 2004, when Maverick was absorbed into Warner Bros. Records Mozella survived the merger. In July 2005, she released her self-titled debut EP on Warner/Maverick Records. Then, in November 2006, she released her full-length debut, I Will, (produced by Jude Cole) on the same imprint. AllMusic called Mozella "one of the best things to come out of pop music this year."

=== Universal/Motown Records ===
Upon signing to Universal/Motown Records in July 2008, Mozella recruited multiple producers and writers for her second album, Belle Isle, including Marty James, Jimmy Harry, Tony Kanal, Sunny Levine, and Smidi. The album was released on October 20, 2009, but prior to that The Straits EP came out July 7, 2009 on this label.

=== The Brian Holland Sessions on Belle Isle Records ===
On July 24, 2012, Mozella released The Brian Holland Sessions, which she co-wrote with Motown songwriter Brian Holland of the trio Holland-Dozier-Holland, who is known for the hits he wrote for The Four Tops, The Isley Brothers, Marvin Gaye, The Supremes and others. "Brian Holland's soul pours out of him in melody everywhere he goes. He is a conduit," she told Rolling Stone about working with the songwriter on her album.

Mozella performed "You Don't Love Anyone But Yourself" from The Brian Holland Sessions on The Tonight Show with Jay Leno on July 26, 2012.

== Touring ==
Following her Warner/Maverick debut in 2006, Mozella toured the U.S. with Tyler Hilton, Dave Matthews Band, Lifehouse, Five for Fighting, Daniel Powter, Michelle Branch, and Colbie Caillat. As she moved away from creating her own album releases, Mozella stopped touring.

== Film and TV placement ==
Mozella's songs have been featured in movies, trailers, and television series' including Fringe, The Closer, The City, Castle, The Hills, Bones, One Tree Hill, The Biggest Loser, American Idol, etc. Her song "More of You" was prominently featured in the first episode of Pretty Little Liars and on the soundtrack. She's also had two song syncs in Grey's Anatomy in 2011.

She has written and recorded numerous songs for commercials including "Amazed" for Mercedes-Benz, "Thank You" and "Let's Stop Calling It Love" for Nivea, "Magic" for Verizon's "iDon't" Motorola Droid campaign. "This is Love" and "Glow" were used in the 2011 and 2013 JC Penney holiday TV advertisements. In 2012, Mozella's cover of "Some Like It Hot" (made famous by Marilyn Monroe) was used for the Carl's Jr./Hardee's "Drive-In" ad, that featured model Kate Upton.REF Later, her songs have been sync'd by Special K, REF Nestle, REF Tesco, McDonald's, Verizon, and more.

== Discography ==
- Mozella EP (2005)
- I Will (2006)
- The Straits EP (2009)
- Belle Isle (2009)
- The Love EP (2010)
- The Brian Holland Sessions (2012)

== Songwriting credits ==
=== Songs written ===
Discography
Artist	Album	Song	Co-written with
A Great Big World	When The Morning Comes (2015)	"Oasis"	Ian Axel, Chad King
Jacob Banks	Village (2018)	"Prosecco"	Jeff "Gitty" Gitelman, Stint
Aaron Carpenter	TBD (2019)	"Next"	Aaron Carpenter, Sam Homaee, Jon Wienner
Tessanne Chin	Count on My Love (2014)	"Tumbling Down"	Ryan Tedder, Noel Zancanella, Peter Svensson
Kelly Clarkson	Piece by Piece (2015)	"Take You High"	Jesse Shatkin
Kelly Clarkson	Meaning of Life (2017)	"Love So Soft"	Priscilla Renea, Jesse Shatkin
Kelly Clarkson	Meaning of Life (2017)	"Don't You Pretend"	Kelly Clarkson, Jesse Shatkin
Kelly Clarkson	Meaning of Life (2017)	"Go High"	Kelly Clarkson, Jesse Shatkin
Kelly Clarkson	Chemistry (2024)	"Down to You"	Kelly Clarkson, Jesse Shatkin
Shontelle	No Gravity (2010)	"Kiss You Up"	Jimmy Harry, Tony Kanal
Miley Cyrus	Bangerz (2013)	"Wrecking Ball"	Lukasz Gottwald, Stephan Moccio, Sacha Skarbek, Kiyanu Kim, Henry Walter
Miley Cyrus	Bangerz (2013)	"FU" (feat. French Montana)	Miley Cyrus, Rami Samir Afuni, Karim Kharbouch
Miley Cyrus	Bangerz (2013)	"Someone Else"	Miley Cyrus, Michael L. Willams II, Pierre Ramon Slaughter, Timothy Thomas, Theron Thomas
Echosmith	Talking Dreams (2014)	"Bright"	Echosmith, Jeffery David
Echosmith	Lonely Generation (2020)	"Everyone Cries"	Echosmith Jeffrey David
Ellipso	—N/a	"Raw" (with Lucky Luke)	Ellipso, Fransisca Hall, Michael Schulz
Evie Erie	Pessimist EP (2020)	"Worst Enemy"	Evie Erie, Greg Kurstin
Fergie	The Great Gatsby soundtrack (2013)	"A Little Party Never Killed Nobody"	Fergie, Q-Tip, GoonRock
Fletcher	The S(ex) Tapes (2020)	"If I Hated You"	Cari Fletcher, James Ryan Ho
Ellie Goulding	Delirium (2015)	"Don't Panic"	Ellie Goulding, Greg Kurstin
Ellie Goulding	Delirium (2015)	"We Can't Move To This"	N/A
Ellie Goulding	Delirium (2015)	"Holding On For Life"	Ellie Goulding, Greg Kurstin
Christina Grimmie	With Love (2013)	"Get Yourself Together"	Rune Westberg, Haley Reinhart
Mickey Guyton	Remember Her Name (2021)	"Indigo"	Mickey Guyton, Jimmy Robbins, Laura Veltz
Niall Horan	Heartbreak Weather (2020)	"New Angel"	Niall Horan, Amy Allen, Greg Kurstin
Benjamin Ingrosso	Identification (2018)	"I’ll Be Fine Somehow"	Benjamin Ingrosso, Axident
Dinah Jane	TBD (2020)	"Missed a Spot"	Dinah Jane, Kamila Hansen, Lisa Scinta, JR Rotem
Jonas Brothers	Happiness Begins (2019)	"I Believe"	Nick Jonas, Greg Kurstin
Jonas Brothers	Happiness Begins (2019)	"Strangers"	Joe Jonas, Nick Jonas, Greg Kurstin
Jonas Brothers	Happiness Begins (2019)	"Every Single Time"	Joe Jonas, Nick Jonas, Greg Kurstin
Jonas Brothers	Happiness Begins (2019)	"Don't Throw It Away"	Joe Jonas, Nick Jonas, Greg Kurstin
Nick Jonas	Spaceman (2021)	"Spaceman"	Nick Jonas, Greg Kurstin
Nick Jonas	Spaceman (2021)	"This Is Heaven"	Nick Jonas, Greg Kurstin
Nick Jonas	Spaceman (2021)	"Don't Give Up on Us"	Nick Jonas, Greg Kurstin
Nick Jonas	Spaceman (2021)	"Heights"	Nick Jonas, Greg Kurstin
Nick Jonas	Spaceman (2021)	"2drunk"	Nick Jonas, Greg Kurstin
Nick Jonas	Spaceman (2021)	"Delicious"	Nick Jonas, Greg Kurstin
Nick Jonas	Spaceman (2021)	"Sexual"	Nick Jonas, Greg Kurstin
Nick Jonas	Spaceman (2021)	"Deeper Love"	Nick Jonas, Greg Kurstin, Mick Jones
Nick Jonas	Spaceman (2021)	"If I Fall"	Nick Jonas, Greg Kurstin
Nick Jonas	Spaceman (2021)	"Death Do Us Part"	Nick Jonas, Greg Kurstin
Nick Jonas	Spaceman (2021)	"Nervous"	Nick Jonas, Greg Kurstin
Mary Lambert	Heart On My Sleeve (2014)	"Secrets"	Mary Lambert, Eric Rosse, Benny Cassette
Mary Lambert	Heart On My Sleeve (2014)	"Heart On My Sleeve"	Mary Lambert, Eric Rosse, Benny Cassette
Mary Lambert	Heart On My Sleeve (2014)	"Sum of Our Parts"	Mary Lambert, Eric Rosse, Benny Cassette
Mary Lambert	Heart On My Sleeve (2014)	"Monochromatic"	Mary Lambert
Mary Lambert	Heart On My Sleeve (2014)	"Wounded Animal"	Mary Lambert, Eric Rosse
Mary Lambert	Heart On My Sleeve (2014)	"So Far Away"	Mary Lambert, Eric Rosse, Benny Cassette
Madonna	Rebel Heart (2015)	"Living for Love"	Madonna, Thomas Wesley Pentz, Toby Gad, Ariel Rechtshaid
Madonna	Rebel Heart (2015)	"Unapologetic Bitch"	Madonna, Thomas Wesley Pentz, Toby Gad, Ariel Rechtshaid
Madonna	Rebel Heart (2015)	"Illuminati"	Madonna, Toby Gad, Larry Griffin, Jr., Mike Dean
Madonna	Rebel Heart (2015)	"Bitch I'm Madonna" (feat. Nicki Minaj)	Madonna, Thomas Wesley Pentz, Toby Gad, Ariel Rechtshaid
Madonna	Rebel Heart (2015)	"Hold Tight"	Madonna, Thomas Wesley Pentz, Toby Gad, Uzoechi Emenike
Madonna	Rebel Heart (2015)	"Joan of Arc"	Madonna, Toby Gad, Larry Griffin Jr.
Madonna	Rebel Heart (2015)	"Iconic" (feat. Chance the Rapper and Mike Tyson)	Madonna, Toby Gad, Larry Griffin Jr., Chancellor Bennett, Dacoury Natche, Michael Tucker
Madonna	Rebel Heart (2015)	"Body Shop"	Madonna, Toby Gad, Larry Griffin Jr., Dacoury Natche, Michael Tucker
Madonna	Rebel Heart - Deluxe Edition (2015)	"Best Night"	Madonna, Thomas Wesley Pentz, Toby Gad, Ariel Rechtshaid
Madonna	Rebel Heart - Deluxe Edition (2015)	"Veni Vidi Vici" (feat. Nas)	Madonna, Thomas Wesley Pentz, Toby Gad, Ariel Rechtshaid
Madonna	Rebel Heart - Deluxe Edition (2015)	"S.E.X."	Madonna, Toby Gad, Larry Griffin Jr.,
Lea Michele	Places (2017)	"Anything's Possible"	Tim Myers
One Direction	Four (2014)	"Fool's Gold"	Jamie Scott, Niall Horan, Zayn Malik, Harry Styles, Louis Tomlinson, Liam Payne
One Direction	Made in the A.M. (2015)	"Perfect"	J Kash, John Ryan, Julian Bunetta, Jesse Shatkin, Harry Styles, Louis Tomlinson
Rachel Platten	Wildfire (2016)	"Speechless"	Rachel Platten, Nolan Lambroza
Pink	Trustfall (2023)	"Long Way to Go" (feat. The Lumineers)	Alecia Moore, John Suddth, Jesse Shatkin, Wesley Schultz, Jeremiah Fraites
Charlie Puth	Nine Track Mind (2015)	"One Call Away"	Charlie Puth, DJ Frank E, Shy Carter, Breyon Isaac, Matthew Prime
Haley Reinhart	Listen Up! (2012)	"Oh My!" (feat. B.o.B)	Haley Reinhart, Rob Kleiner, Bobby Ray Simmons, Jr.
Haley Reinhart	Listen Up! (2012)	"Undone"	Haley Reinhart, Rune Westberg
Rihanna	Home soundtrack (2015)	"Dancing In The Dark"	Mikkel Storleer Eriksen, Tor Erik Hermansen, Ester Dean
Robin Schulz	Uncovered (2017)	"OK" (feat. James Blunt)	Robin Schulz, Steve Mac, James Blunt
Shontelle	No Gravity (2010)	"Kiss You Up"	Jimmy Harry, Tony Kanal
Shura	Nothing's Real (2016)	"What's It Gonna Be?"	Aleksndra Yakunina-Denton, Greg Kurstin, Joel Pott
Shura	Nothing's Real (2016)	"Tongue Tied"	Aleksndra Yakunina-Denton, Greg Kurstin
Lennon Stella	Love, Me EP (2018)	"Fortress"	Lennon Stella, Greg Kurstin
Lindsey Stirling	Artemis (2019)	"The Upside" (feat. Elle King)	Lindsey Stirling, Taylor Bird, Peter Hanna, Maize Jane Olinger
Martina Stoessel	Tini (2016)	"Still Standing" / "Sigo adelante"	Lindy Robbins, Jason Evigan
Tinashe	Aquarius (2014)	"Feels Like Vegas"	Tinashe, Mikkel Storleer Eriksen, Tor Erik Hermansen, Jeffrey Johnson Jr.
Tove Styrke	Sway (2018)	"Sway"	Tove Styrke, Joe Janiak
Keith Urban	Graffiti U (2018)	"Drop Top" (feat. Kassi Ashton)	Jimmy Robbins, Josh Osborne
Keith Urban	Graffiti U (2018)	"Horses" (feat. Lindsay Ell)	Matt Rad, Jamie Scott
Rosé	Rosie (2024)	"Dance All Night"	Chae Young Park, Greg Kurstin
