= The Author (song) =

Single by Brandon Lake and Nick Jonas
- Released: May 1, 2026
- Length: 4:36
- Label: Provident; Sony
- Songwriters: Brandon Lake; Nick Jonas; Benjamin William Hastings; Micah Nichols; Trannie Anderson; Antonio AJ Cunningham
- Producer: Micah Nichols

Brandon Lake singles chronology
"The Jesus I Know Now" (2026)	"The Author" (2026)

Nick Jonas singles chronology
"Gut Punch" (2026)	"The Author" (2026)

Lyric video
- "The Author" on YouTube

"The Author" is a song recorded by the American contemporary Christian musician Brandon Lake and the American singer Nick Jonas. The song was released as a single on May 1, 2026, via Provident Label Group and Sony Music, to digital download, streaming, and Christian radio formats. It was written by Lake, Jonas, Benjamin William Hastings, Micah Nichols, Trannie Anderson, and Antonio AJ Cunningham, while production was handled by Nichols.

== Release and promotion ==
In late 2025, Lake teased the release of a collaboration with Jonas through social media; teasers would continue to be uploaded until the song's official release. Upon its release, the track was premiered at the Credit One Stadium in Charleston, South Carolina, a performance which was also incidentally the final location on Lake's King of Hearts Tour. That same day, a second collaboration between Lake and Jonas, a remix of the latter's "Hope", was also released. The song was not heavily promoted because the performers wanted to "observe how listeners would respond" to it being surprise released. The song was promoted with the release of a lyric video, which was uploaded to YouTube.

== Background ==
"The Author" is one of several songs released or teased by Lake in collaboration with a mainstream musician. One of the first examples of this includes "Hard Fought Hallelujah", a song by him and Jelly Roll, which was released in November 2024 to great commercial acclaim. The song won the Grammy Award for Best Contemporary Christian Music Performance/Song and completed 2025 as, not only the best-selling Christian song of the year, but also the 84th best selling song of the year overall in the United States. In addition to these songs, Lake also hosted a writers' retreat in Nashville, Tennessee, in which he and twenty-five other musicians wrote forty-three Christianity-themed songs. Jonas was among the retreat's attendees, as well as other notable musicians such as Thomas Rhett, Tyler Hubbard, Dan + Shay, and Bailey Zimmerman.

== Style ==
"The Author" has been considered to be a ballad. It is composed using predominantly acoustic instruments, most notably piano, in an attempt to maintain a quiet and traditional sound. Later on in the song, the duo implements the use of drums and background vocals. Lake sings using falsetto, overlaying "gently strummed acoustic guitar". The lyrics to "The Author" demonstrate a confession of Lake and Jonas "surrendering the pen of our own stories to the one who is actually writing them".

== Commercial performance ==
"The Author" received noteworthy early recognition, and within a day the track rose to lead Apple Music record sales charts. Within its first charted week, the song debuted at number 8 on the Billboard Hot Christian Songs chart and number 2 on the Digital Song Sales chart. It also received international success, reaching number 35 on the Recorded Music NZ New Zealand Hot Singles chart and number 29 on the Today's Christian Music Australian Christian Airplay chart.

== Personnel ==
Credits adapted from Spotify.

- Angel Delgado – recording engineer
- Antonio AJ Cunningham – vocal arranger
- Ashley Broadwater – choir
- Benjamin William Hastings – writer
- Brandon Lake – writer, lead vocals
- Carlos Vidal – bass
- Christian Boutan – background vocals
- John Campbell – choir
- John Thomas Price – drums, recording engineer
- Khrystina Harvey – choir
- Kidada Perrymod – choir
- Matt Huber – mixer
- Micah Nichols – producer, writer, acoustic guitar, bouzouki, editor, electric guitar, keyboards, mandolin, programmer, recording engineer
- Nick Jonas – writer, lead vocals
- Sam Moses – masterer
- Scotty Murray – pedal steel guitar
- Todd Lyons – recording engineer
- Trannie Anderson – writer

== Charts ==
Chart performance for "The Author"
Chart (2026)	Peak position
Australian Christian Airplay (TCM)	2
New Zealand Airplay (Radioscope)	24
New Zealand Hot Singles (RMNZ)	35
UK Christian Airplay (Cross Rhythms)	2
US Christian Adult Contemporary (Billboard)	17
US Christian Airplay (Billboard)	17
US Digital Song Sales (Billboard)	2
US Hot Christian Songs (Billboard)	8

== Release history ==
Release history for "The Author"
Region	Date	Format	Label	Ref.
Various	May 1, 2026	Digital download; streaming	Provident Label Group; Sony Music	
United States	May 1, 2026	Christian radio	Provident Label Group; Sony Music	
