= Call Me Brother =

- Directed by: David Howe
- Written by: Christina Parrish
- Starring: Christina Parrish; Andrew Dismukes
- Release date: November 6, 2020
- Running time: 78 minutes
- Country: United States
- Language: English

Call Me Brother is a 2020 American comedy film written by Christina Parrish, directed by David Howe and starring Andrew Dismukes and Parrish.

== Cast ==
- Christina Parrish as Lisa
- Andrew Dismukes as Tony
- Asaf Ronen as Frank
- Danu Uribe as Doris

== Release ==
The film was released in virtual cinemas on November 6, 2020.

== Reception ==
The film has a 57% rating on Rotten Tomatoes based on seven reviews.

Jenny Nulf of The Austin Chronicle awarded the film two and a half stars out of five and wrote, "It’s the kind of roughness that to an extent works because of Call Me Brother's punchy fearlessness, and at the end of the day you're either in on the joke or not.

Alan Ng of Film Threat rated the film a 7.5 out of 10 and wrote, "The story and script are brilliant in how well it manages our emotions of confusion and disgust. It feeds these emotions little by little as if coaxing us into a trap."
