= Find You (Nick Jonas song) =

Single by Nick Jonas
- Released: September 14, 2017
- Recorded: 2017
- Length: 3:17
- Label: Island; Safehouse
- Songwriters: Nick Jonas; Simon Wilcox; Jakob Hazell; Svante Halldin
- Producer: Jack & Coke

Nick Jonas singles chronology
"Remember I Told You" (2017)	"Find You" (2017)	"Anywhere" (2018)

Music video
- "Find You" on YouTube

"Find You" is a song by American singer Nick Jonas. It was released on September 14, 2017, through Island and Safehouse Records.

== Background ==
On September 11, 2017, Jonas teased his next track on Twitter. On Instagram, Jonas teased the track with a series of images showing the same desert picture as is on his Twitter account. The release date of September 14 was announced one day later. On September 13, he shared a snippet of the song through Instagram. Speaking about the new track with iHeartRadio, Nick said, "'Find You' is about a lot of things. For me, it's got a lot to do with just the idea of finding love, in general, and the journey we all go on with that. And how sometimes, it can be something you're afraid of and running away from it in that sense, but it is desperately something we all hope for."

== Critical reception ==
Hugh McIntyre from Forbes said that "Find You" felt like it "would be better suited for the lazy, muggy days of summer". He also called the song "[a] cool track" and noted the Robin Schulz inspiration behind it as the record blends "[an] acoustic guitar with an understated electronic beat". McIntyre also praised Jonas' vocals.

== Music video ==
During an intimate performance he confirmed that the song's music video will be released on September 18, 2017. The song's music video was released on September 19, 2017. The video follows Nick as he broods in the sandy desert, stumbles upon a beach rave, and dives head-first into the ocean. The music video was produced by Emil Nava.

== Live performance ==
He performed the song live for the first time alongside "Chains", "Levels", "Close" and "Jealous" during an intimate performance in Los Angeles. On September 19, 2017, he performed the song on The Ellen DeGeneres Show. On October 4, 2017, he performed the song during an episode of Total Request Live. On November 19, 2017, he performed "Find You" on the American Music Awards.

== Track listing ==
- Digital download
1. "Find You" – 3:17
- Digital download
1. "Find You" (Acoustic version) – 3:15
- Digital download
1. "Find You" (RAMI Remix) – 3:15
- Digital download
1. "Find You" (featuring Karol G) (Remix) – 3:17

== Charts ==
Chart (2017)	Peak position
Australia (ARIA)	88
Canada (Canadian Hot 100)	95
France (SNEP)	164
New Zealand Heatseekers (RMNZ)	3
Scotland Singles (OCC)	93
Slovakia (Rádio Top 100)	55
UK Singles Downloads (OCC)	81
US Bubbling Under Hot 100 (Billboard)	1
US Pop Airplay (Billboard)	34

== Certifications ==
Region	Certification	Certified units/sales
Brazil (Pro-Música Brasil)	Gold	30,000^{‡}
New Zealand (RMNZ)	Gold	15,000^{‡}
^{‡} Sales+streaming figures based on certification alone.

== Release history ==
Region	Date	Format	Version	Label	Ref.
Various	September 14, 2017	Digital download	Original	Island; Safehouse	
Various	September 15, 2017	Digital download	Original	Island; Safehouse	
United States	September 19, 2017	Contemporary hit radio	Original	Island; Republic	
Various	October 6, 2017	Digital download	Acoustic Version	Island; Safehouse	
Various	November 10, 2017	Digital download	RAMI Remix	Island; Safehouse	
Various	November 10, 2017	Digital download	(Remix) with Karol G	Island; Safehouse	
