= Anywhere (Mustard and Nick Jonas song) =

Single by Mustard and Nick Jonas
- Released: May 11, 2018
- Genre: Future bass
- Length: 4:14
- Label: Interscope; 10 Summers
- Songwriters: Dijon McFarlane; Nick Jonas; Paul Salva; Americo Garcia; Jorge Medina; Brandon Paak
- Producers: Mustard; Salva; Medina (co.); Garcia (co.)

Mustard singles chronology
"Want Her" (2017)	"Anywhere" (2018)	"Pure Water" (2019)

Nick Jonas singles chronology
"Find You" (2017)	"Anywhere" (2018)	"Right Now" (2018)

"Anywhere" is a song by American music producer Mustard and American singer Nick Jonas. Written by Jonas, Anderson .Paak and its producers Mustard, Salva, Americo Garcia and Jorge Medina, it was released by 10 Summers Records and Interscope Records on May 11, 2018.

== Background and release ==
Both artists teased the single in an Instagram video prior to its release, in which the song's details were displayed on an airport departures board. The airport display board shows the artists' names and the song's title. The song is a mix between EDM, trap and pop with a synth heavy baseline which features Nick trying to rekindle his relationship with an ex-girlfriend.

== Critical reception ==
HotNewHipHop's Trevor Smith said that "DJ Mustard continues his flirtations with the world of pop music on 'Anywhere'", a track that is "filled with warped vocal samples pitched to sound like synths and big keyboard lines. He opined that "it's closer to the maximalist pop of Diplo and Skrillex than Mustard's signature RnBass bounce, but he wears it well". Idolator's Mike Nied said that the song blends elements of pop, hip hop and electronica, and is "a pensive mid-tempo tailored both for the clubs and more casual listening. On it, the 25-year-old reflects on his relationship with a lover."

== Live performances ==
Jonas and Mustard performed the song live along with "Jealous" with contestant Jurnee during the finale of American Idol season 16 on May 21. They performed the song live during the Electric Daisy Carnival that same weekend. They performed the single during the 2018 MTV Movie & TV Awards on June 18.

== Music video ==
On May 22, 2018, the music video of the song was released. The video follows a couple as they shift between moments of pure joy and raging anger. Jonas and Mustard dance and sing along to the track with an LED screen blasting lights behind them, and the video concludes with the couple going their separate ways, acting like near strangers as one of them boards the subway.

On June 1, 2018, a vertical video recorded at the Electric Daisy Carnival in Las Vegas was released on Spotify.

== Personnel ==
Credits adapted from Tidal.

- Mustard – production
- Salva – production
- Jorge Medina – co-production
- Americo Garcia – co-production
- Chris Athens – master engineering
- Jaycen Joshua – mixing

== Charts ==
Chart (2018)	Peak position
Czech Republic Airplay (ČNS IFPI)	78
