= Andrew Dismukes =

American comedian (born 1995)

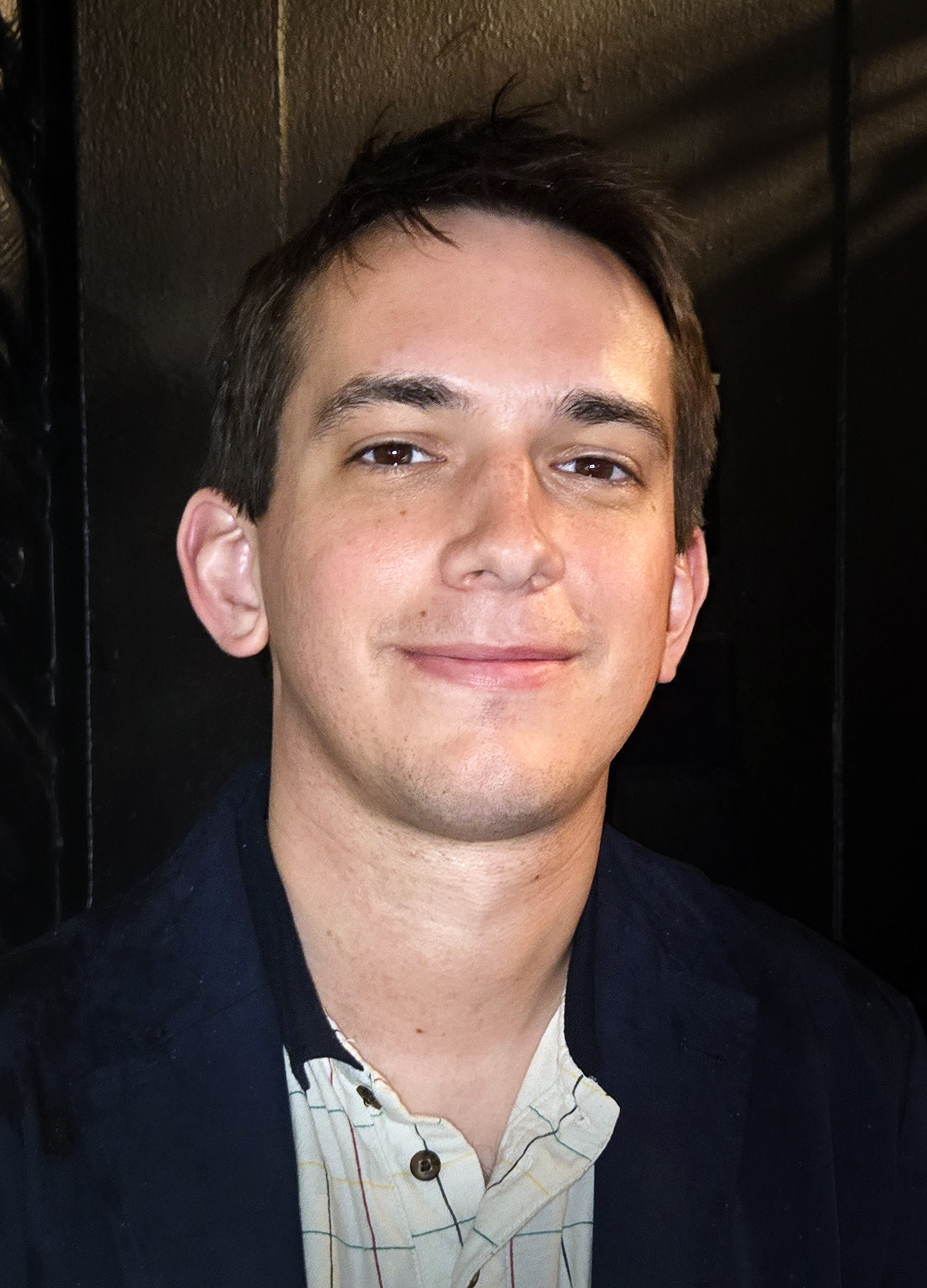
- Dismukes in 2025
- Born: Andrew Vincent Dismukes; June 21, 1995 (age 31); Houston, Texas, U.S.
- Education: University of Texas at Austin (BS)
- Occupations: Comedian; writer; actor
- Years active: 2013–present
- Known for: Saturday Night Live
- Spouse: Aly Dixon (m. 2025)

Andrew Vincent Dismukes (/dɪzˈmjuːks/; born June 21, 1995) is an American comedian, actor, and writer. Dismukes was hired as a writer for the NBC sketch comedy series Saturday Night Live in 2017, ahead of its 43rd season. He was then hired to join the cast as a featured player in 2020 for its 46th season and became a repertory player during its 48th season in 2022.

== Early life and education ==
Dismukes was born in Houston, Texas. He grew up in Port Neches, Texas, a small Gulf Coast city located near the Texas-Louisiana border. Dismukes graduated from Port Neches-Groves High School in 2013. He attended the University of Texas at Austin, graduating in 2017 with a Bachelor of Science degree in Radio-Television-Film. He is of Cajun descent.

== Career ==
Dismukes began performing stand-up in 2013, while a freshman in college, and was active in the Austin comedy scene. He was the runner-up "Funniest Person in Austin" in 2016, a contest run by the Cap City Comedy Club.

Upon graduating, Dismukes performed at the Just for Laughs comedy festival as part of the New Faces showcase, subsequently being offered an audition for Saturday Night Live. He officially joined the show's writing staff at the beginning of season 43. As part of the writing staff, he received an Emmy nomination for the Outstanding Writing For A Variety Series in 2018 and 2019.

After serving as a writer for three seasons with SNL, Dismukes joined the cast as a featured player for its season 46. He was promoted to repertory status at the start of the show's season 48 in 2022.

== Filmography ==
=== Film ===
Year	Title	Role	Notes
2020	Call Me Brother	Tony	Main role
2026	Super Troopers 3	Trooper Coy Burns	

=== Television ===
Year	Title	Role	Notes
2020–present	Saturday Night Live	Various characters	Served as a writer from 2017–2020
2024–2025	The Second Best Hospital in the Galaxy	Matt (voice)	Main role
2025	Saturday Night Live 50th Anniversary Special	Matt	Television special

== Awards and nominations ==
Year	Association	Category	Work	Result	Ref.
2018	Florida Film Festival	Special Jury Award for Performance (shared with Christina Parrish)	Call Me Brother	Won	
2018	Primetime Emmy Awards	Outstanding Writing for a Variety Series	Saturday Night Live	Nominated	
2019	Primetime Emmy Awards	Outstanding Writing for a Variety Series	Saturday Night Live	Nominated	
2019	Writers Guild of America Awards	Comedy/Variety Sketch Series	Saturday Night Live	Nominated	
2020	Writers Guild of America Awards	Comedy/Variety Sketch Series	Saturday Night Live	Nominated	
