= Spaceman (Nick Jonas song) =

2021 single by Nick Jonas

Single by Nick Jonas

from the album Spaceman
- Released: February 25, 2021
- Genre: R&B
- Length: 3:17
- Label: Island
- Songwriter(s): Nicholas Jonas; Greg Kurstin; Maureen "Mozella" McDonald
- Producer(s): Kurstin

Nick Jonas singles chronology
"Right Now" (2018)	"Spaceman" (2021)	"This Is Heaven" (2021)

"Spaceman" is a song by American singer Nick Jonas. It was released as the lead single and title track of his fourth studio album on February 25, 2021. It was written by Jonas, Greg Kurstin and Maureen McDonald.

== Background ==
Jonas first dropped hints about his upcoming album on his social media in early February 2021. The singer officially kicked off the era on February 25 by releasing the lead single "Spaceman". The lyrics were widely considered to be about the COVID-19 pandemic. When asked about the title during an interview with Zane Lowe, he explained, "The key for me was trying to find a way to give this idea a persona, give it a name. So 'Spaceman' kind of came into my mind as I was thinking, 'What's the one thing that all of us have felt during this time? Completely disconnected from the world."

== Live performances ==
On February 20, 2021, it was announced that he would appear on Saturday Night Live on February 27 to perform his new single. The performance included the single "Spaceman" and the second single of the album "This Is Heaven".

== Music video ==
The music video was directed by Anthony Mandler and shows Jonas wandering a desolate planet where he lives in a futuristic mirrored abode. The foreboding cinematography by David Devlin was nominated for several awards.

Nick Jonas unsuccessfully tries to get back home to his wife. Jonas' wife Priyanka Chopra Jonas makes appearances via a hologram and through screens he watches. The video was inspired by the COVID-19 lockdowns.

== Plagiarism accusation ==
On March 1, 2021, French-American R&B and pop singer Lolo Zouai called out Jonas, accusing him of copying her and showing similarities between the introduction of her song "Jade" and "Spaceman". She also stated that Jonas flew her out to help her with her song and then ghosted her, also revealing that her song "High Highs to Low Lows" is partially about Jonas.

== Charts ==
Chart performance for "Spaceman"
Chart (2021)	Peak position
Guatemala Anglo (Monitor Latino)	5
Netherlands (Dutch Tip 40)	24
New Zealand Hot Singles (RMNZ)	14
Panama Anglo (Monitor Latino)	10
US Bubbling Under Hot 100 (Billboard)	24
US Digital Song Sales (Billboard)	37

== Release history ==
Release dates and formats for "Spaceman"
Region	Date	Formats	Label	Ref.
Various	February 25, 2021	Digital download; streaming	Island	
