= This Is Heaven (song) =

Single by Nick Jonas

from the album Spaceman
- Released: March 5, 2021
- Genre: Disco; R&B; synthpop
- Length: 3:34
- Label: Island
- Songwriters: Nicholas Jonas; Greg Kurstin; Maureen "Mozella" McDonald
- Producer: Kurstin

Nick Jonas singles chronology
"Spaceman" (2021)	"This Is Heaven" (2021)	"Maan Meri Jaan (Afterlife)" (2023)

"This Is Heaven" is a song by American singer Nick Jonas. It was released as the second single of his fourth studio album Spaceman on March 5, 2021. It was written by Nick Jonas, Greg Kurstin and Maureen McDonald.

== Background ==
Jonas first dropped hints about his upcoming album on his social media in early February 2021. In an interview with Apple Music's Zane Lowe, Jonas shared that all the songs on his upcoming album, Spaceman, are in fact penned to his wife.

== Critical reception ==
Elite Daily's Daffany Chan called the song an R&B-infused track that is an ode to a lover that's packed with dreamy lyrics. In an album review, David from auspOp described the song as "pop magic" saying "Its pure pop – there's no features or remixed versions – it's a clean cut hit."

== Music video ==
The Daniel Broadley-directed opens on Jonas as he's writing lines on a typewriter about a space man whose jetpack ignites and launches him skyward. The written scene he describes is where the video of "Spaceman" ended. While Jonas is no longer stranded in space in the new video, he is still isolated for most of the clip. He wanders empty hallways and a forest alone as he sings about being in heaven when he's with the one that he loves. For the buoyant chorus scenes, he is no longer alone, as a choir and band provide backup in a bright cathedral. The choir accompaniment was performed by the London Community Gospel Choir, with David Angol on the saxophone, Aaron Graham on drums, and Leiah Fournier on the keyboard. The music video was directed by Daniel Broadley with filming in Southampton and in St John's, Hyde Park

== Live performances ==
On February 20, 2021, it was announced that he would appear on Saturday Night Live on February 27 to perform his new single. The performance included the single "Spaceman" and the second single of the album "This Is Heaven".

== Charts ==
=== Weekly charts ===
Weekly chart performance for "This Is Heaven"
Chart (2021)	Peak position
Czech Republic Airplay (ČNS IFPI)	28
Canada CHR/Top 40 (Billboard)	45
Hungary (Rádiós Top 40)	12

=== Year-end charts ===
Year-end chart performance for "This Is Heaven"
Chart (2021)	Position
Hungary (Rádiós Top 40)	80

== Release history ==
Release dates and formats for "This Is Heaven"
Region	Date	Formats	Label	Ref.
Various	March 4, 2021	Digital download; streaming	Island	
