= Right Now (Nick Jonas and Robin Schulz song) =

Single by Nick Jonas vs. Robin Schulz
- Released: August 24, 2018
- Genre: EDM
- Length: 3:21
- Label: Island; Safehouse
- Songwriters: Nick Jonas; Robin Schulz; Steve Mac; Holly Hafermann; Lindsey Stirling; Andrew McMahon; Taylor Bird; Peter Hanna
- Producers: Steve Mac; Schulz; JUNKX

Nick Jonas singles chronology
"Anywhere" (2018)	"Right Now" (2018)	"Spaceman" (2021)

Robin Schulz singles chronology
"Oh Child" (2018)	"Right Now" (2018)	"Speechless" (2018)

"Right Now" is a song by American singer Nick Jonas and German musician, DJ and record producer Robin Schulz. Written by Jonas and Skylar Grey, it was released by Island Records on August 24, 2018. Although this was Nick's last solo single before the Jonas Brothers reunited in 2019, he released the song "Spaceman" on February 25, 2021.

== Background and release ==
On August 9 during an interview with Teen Vogue, Nick announced the song is one he had "been sitting on for awhile, but I was looking for the right time to put it out and the right person to collaborate with. [...] It's a song with Robin Schulz which I'm really excited about called "Right Now" that I wrote with Skylar Grey." The song was released on August 24. Upon the release of the song, several outlets speculated that the song was written about Jonas's wife Priyanka Chopra. On August 24, Skylar Grey took to her Instagram Stories to explain who inspired the song in further detail. She stated: "This song is about Elliot [her boyfriend]. Guys, Nick Jonas just put out a new song with Robin Schulz, and that's a song I worked on with him. And guess what? The song was inspired by my love [Elliot], cause I was always on these trips, going away and working, and on that one I was in London working with Nick, and something Elliot always used to say to me was "I swear, the next time I have you in my arms I'm never letting you go." And that's what inspired the song."

== Critical reception ==
The song received positive reviews from music critics. Kat Bein of Billboard said the song is a flirty dance-pop tune perfect for summer nights that reveal hidden excitement. A dancehall-inspired rhythm sets the scene for a folk-like melodic hook. Jonas gives a lovesick lean to his performance as he yearns for his lover to return from some far-off journey. It's a sultry club mood that lives up to the promise of the dark, red artwork.

== Live performances ==
On September 7, 2018, Jonas and Schulz performed the song live on The Tonight Show Starring Jimmy Fallon.

== Music video ==
On September 28, 2018 the music video of the song was released online. It shows Jonas singing the song in front of a black background.

== Track listing ==
Digital download

1. "Right Now" – 3:21

Digital download

1. "Right Now (Robin Schulz VIP Remix)" – 2:58

== Personnel ==
Adapted from Tidal.

- Nick Jonas – composition
- Robin Schulz – composition, production
- Peter Hanna – composition
- Andrew McMahon – composition
- Taylor Bird – composition
- Skylar Grey – composition, backing vocals
- Steve Mac – composition, keyboard, production
- Junkx – composition, studio personnel, engineering, production
- Lindsey Stirling – composition
- Zane Carney – guitar
- John Paricelli – guitar
- Dann Pursey – guitar, studio personnel, engineering
- Juergen Dohr – keyboards
- Dennis Bierbrodt – keyboards
- Guido Kramer – keyboards, programming
- Chris Laws – drum programming, drums, studio personnel, engineering
- Eric Madrid – mixing, studio personnel
- William Binderup – studio personnel, assistant mixing

== Charts ==
=== Weekly charts ===
Chart (2018)	Peak position
Croatia (HRT)	77
Germany (GfK)	78
Hungary (Rádiós Top 40)	38
Ireland (IRMA)	99
New Zealand Hot Singles (RMNZ)	17
Romania (Airplay 100)	89
Russia Airplay (Tophit)	95
Sweden Heatseeker (Sverigetopplistan)	1
Switzerland (Schweizer Hitparade)	72
US Hot Dance/Electronic Songs (Billboard)	14

=== Year-end charts ===
Chart (2018)	Position
US Hot Dance/Electronic Songs (Billboard)	70

== Certifications ==
Region	Certification	Certified units/sales
Brazil (Pro-Música Brasil)	2× Platinum	80,000^{‡}
^{‡} Sales+streaming figures based on certification alone.
