= Golden Hour (song) =

Single by Jvke

from the album This Is What ____ Feels Like (Vol. 1–4)
- Released: July 15, 2022
- Recorded: 2022
- Genre: Pop
- Length: 3:29
- Label: AWAL
- Songwriters: Jacob Lawson; Zac Lawson
- Producers: Jvke; Zvc

Jvke singles chronology
"this is what falling in love feels like" (2021)	"Golden Hour" (2022)	"Hero" (2022)

Music video
- "Golden Hour" on YouTube

"Golden Hour" is a song by American singer-songwriter Jvke. Released as a single on July 15, 2022, it went viral on TikTok later in the year and became an international hit.

== Content ==
The song, three minutes and twenty-nine seconds long, is in the key of E major, changing at the end to B minor, with a tempo of 94 beats per minute. It uses many orchestral musical styles and instruments, primarily piano and strings.

It makes lyrical references to Donald Glover, and Frank Ocean's 2016 album Blonde.

== Critical reception ==
The song received critical acclaim. Jason Lipshutz of Billboard wrote, "'Golden Hour' has a winning formula: semi-rapped verses full of romantic observations and modern music references, boiling into an enormous, crooned-from-the-gut chorus. Jvke, to his credit, nails the push-pull at the heart of the song—nimble enough to sound nonchalant during the lead-up, then giving his absolute all on the hook — while the racing piano line beneath him is a memorable piece of production that simultaneously doesn't distract from the vocal take." Other Billboard writers called the song an "incredibly well-crafted, fresh-sounding, lush pop ballad by a prodigious singer-songwriter, with a frantic piano hook, soaring vocals, ornate production, majestic presentation and a sense of orchestral drama."

Erica Campbell of NME called the song a "glittery ballad", and a "slow-burn love song, brimming with keys and strings".

George Griffiths of the Official Charts Company described the song as a "tender piano ballad with a succinct hip-hop influence, that sees JVKE recount the hopeful blossoming of a relationship."

== Chart performance ==
The song reached the top 10 in the United States, in addition to charting in Canada, Australia, Germany, Ireland, the Netherlands, the United Kingdom, New Zealand, Switzerland, and the Global 200.

== Remixes ==
Remixes were also released by Illenium & Nurko, Jungle, Ruel, Anton Powers, Shirley Setia, Henry Lau, A7S, blond, Leon Leiden, Vertile, Fujii Kaze, minLee, R3HAB, Seven Kayne, Xplosn and SB19.

== Live performances ==
Jvke performed the song for MTV on October 7, 2022, at the iHeartRadio 2022 Jingle Ball on December 9, as well as on Good Morning America on January 23, 2023.

Bodie Kuljian, a contestant for season 22 of The Voice, performed the song onstage on November 28, 2022.

== Personnel ==
- Jake Lawson – vocals, backing vocals, piano
- Zac Lawson – synthesizers, programming, synth bass, percussion, drum programming

== Accolades ==
Awards and nominations for "Golden Hour"
Ceremony	Year	Award	Result	Ref.
MTV Video Music Awards Japan	2023	Best New Artist Video (International)	Won	

== Charts ==
=== Weekly charts ===
Weekly chart performance for "Golden Hour"
Chart (2022–2024)	Peak position
Australia (ARIA)	29
Austria (Ö3 Austria Top 40)	57
Canada (Canadian Hot 100)	19
Germany (GfK)	66
Global 200 (Billboard)	13
Ireland (IRMA)	25
Japan Digital Singles (Oricon) Fujii Kaze remix	26
Japan Hot Overseas (Billboard Japan)	4
Netherlands (Single Top 100)	62
New Zealand (Recorded Music NZ)	22
Norway (VG-lista)	33
Philippines (Billboard)	25
Portugal (AFP)	32
Singapore (RIAS)	2
Sweden Heatseeker (Sverigetopplistan)	8
Switzerland (Schweizer Hitparade)	47
UK Singles (Official Charts)	19
UK Indie (Official Charts)	3
US Billboard Hot 100	10
US Adult Contemporary (Billboard)	18
US Adult Pop Airplay (Billboard)	13
US Pop Airplay (Billboard)	10
Vietnam (Vietnam Hot 100)	7

=== Year-end charts ===
Year-end chart performance for "Golden Hour"
Chart (2023)	Position
Australia (ARIA)	57
Canada (Canadian Hot 100)	38
Global 200 (Billboard)	21
New Zealand (Recorded Music NZ)	48
UK Singles (OCC)	71
US Billboard Hot 100	41
US Adult Top 40 (Billboard)	48
US Mainstream Top 40 (Billboard)	33

== Certifications ==
Certifications for "Golden Hour"
Region	Certification	Certified units/sales
Australia (ARIA)	5× Platinum	350,000^{‡}
Denmark (IFPI Danmark)	Gold	45,000^{‡}
France (SNEP)	Platinum	200,000^{‡}
Italy (FIMI)	Gold	50,000^{‡}
New Zealand (RMNZ)	3× Platinum	90,000^{‡}
Portugal (AFP)	Platinum	10,000^{‡}
Spain (Promusicae)	Platinum	60,000^{‡}
United Kingdom (BPI)	Platinum	600,000^{‡}
United States (RIAA)	5× Platinum	5,000,000^{‡}
^{‡} Sales+streaming figures based on certification alone.

== Release history ==
Release dates and formats for "Golden Hour"
Region	Date	Format(s)	Version	Label	Ref.
Various	July 15, 2022	Digital download; streaming	Original; cello; slowed; sped up	AWAL	
Various	August 5, 2022	Digital download; streaming	Indian with Shirley Setia; Anton Powers remix	AWAL	
United States	September 13, 2022	Contemporary hit radio	Original	AWAL	
Various	October 7, 2022	Digital download; streaming	Illenium and Nurko remix	AWAL	
Various	October 28, 2022	Digital download; streaming	Jungle remix	AWAL	
Various	November 18, 2022	Digital download; streaming	Chinese with Henry; Ruel remix; Dekko remix	AWAL	
Various	November 25, 2022	Digital download; streaming	A7S remix; Holiday remix	AWAL	
Various	December 30, 2022	Digital download; streaming	Carta remix	AWAL	
Various	February 1, 2023	Digital download; streaming	French with Blond	AWAL	
Various	March 31, 2023	Digital download; streaming	Leon Leiden	AWAL	
Various	April 21, 2023	Digital download; streaming	Fujii Kaze remix	AWAL	
Various	July 7, 2023	Digital download; streaming	SB19 remix	AWAL	
