= Jvke =

American singer-songwriter and producer (born 2001)

JVKE
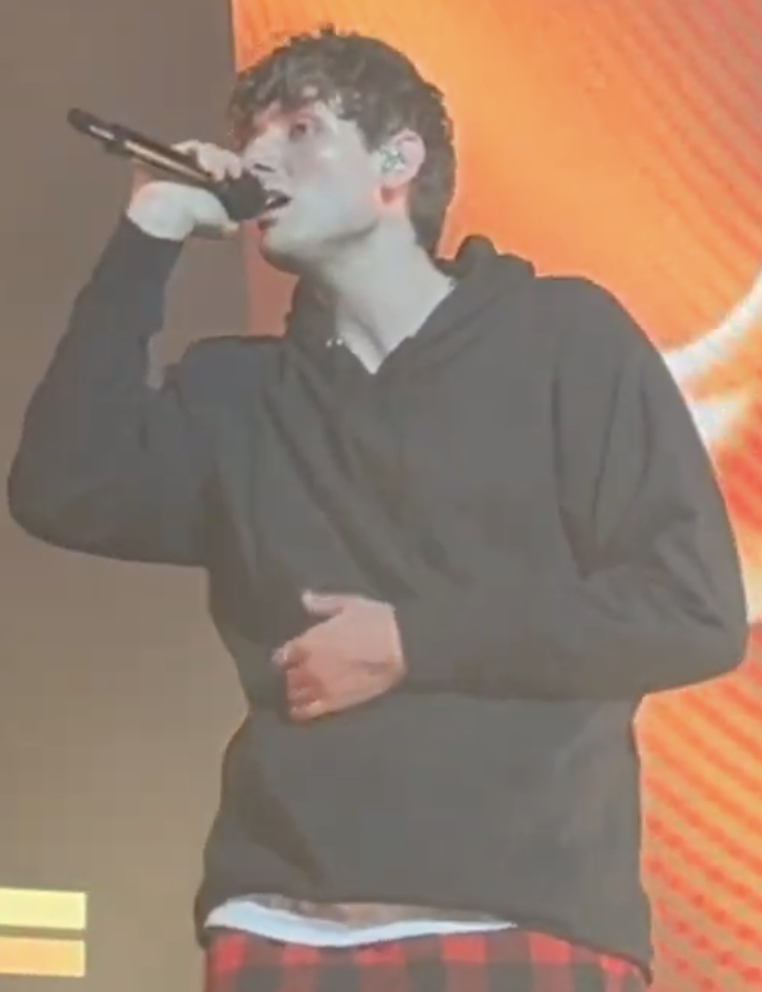
- Jvke performing in 2023

Background information
- Born: Jacob Dodge Lawson; March 3, 2001 (age 25); Providence, Rhode Island, U.S.
- Origin: Cranston, Rhode Island, U.S.
- Genres: Ballad music; Hip-hop
- Occupations: Singer; songwriter; producer
- Instruments: Vocals; guitar; drums; piano
- Years active: 2020–present
- Label: AWAL
- Website: itsjvke.com

Jacob Dodge Lawson (born March 3, 2001), known professionally as Jvke (stylized in all caps and pronounced "Jake"), is an American singer-songwriter, record producer, and social media personality. During the COVID-19 lockdowns, he started creating TikTok videos for his songs, one of which, "Upside Down", went viral in 2021. His debut album, This Is What ____ Feels Like (Vol. 1–4), peaked at number 40 on the Billboard 200, while the song "Golden Hour" peaked at number 10 on the Billboard Hot 100. Jvke was named the MTV Push Artist for October 2022 and performed "Golden Hour" live on the Tonight Show with Jimmy Fallon, as well as making several performances in Europe for MTV.

== Early life ==
Jacob Dodge Lawson was born in Providence, Rhode Island. The son of a music teacher named Pamela and a church pastor named John Dodge Lawson Jr., he took drum and piano lessons at a young age as well as singing and writing songs for his church. Before transferring to public high school in his hometown of Cranston, Jvke attended Catholic school. He studied at the Community College of Rhode Island for one-year-and-a-half before dropping out to pursue music full-time.

== Career ==
In 2020, during the COVID-19 lockdowns, Jvke and his family joined TikTok. After an early period of creating skits and other videos, he announced his first single, "Upside Down". The song became popular, leading to Charlie Puth approaching him for a remix.

Jvke released "Golden Hour" on July 15, 2022, a song which he and his brother Zac Lawson wrote and produced, along with editing its music video. He was also recognized by MTV Italia,. "Golden Hour" debuted on the Billboard Hot 100 at number 71 and peaked at number 10. It also reached number 19 on the UK Singles Chart. On November 17, 2022, he announced his first tour, taking in New York, Los Angeles and other nationwide cities. On December 8, 2022, Jvke released "Hero", a collaboration with Martin Garrix and the mobile card game Marvel Snap.

In 2023, Jvke was featured on the track "Angel Pt. 1", a song by Kodak Black, NLE Choppa, BTS member Jimin, and Muni Long. The song is part of the soundtrack of Fast X (2023). The same year on September 28, he released a new single, "This Is What Space Feels Like", via a text message with a video to fans who signed up to receive his text messages. Jvke had previously teased new music on the social media platform X. On September 13, 2024, he and Nick Jonas released "This is What Forever Feels Like". On July 10, 2025, Jvke released the single "Butterflies" featuring Le Sserafim member Kim Chaewon and TXT member Taehyun, to which Gil Kaufman of Billboard stated the trio "may have just dropped the song of the summer".

== Discography ==
=== Studio albums ===
List of studio albums, with selected details and chart positions
Title	Details	Peak chart positions		
Title	Details	US	CAN	LTU
This Is What Feels Like (Vol. 1–4)	Released: September 23, 2022; Label: Jvke Music, AWAL; Formats: Digital download, streaming	40	58	66

=== Collaborative albums ===
List of collaborative albums, with selected details and chart positions
Title	Details	Peak chart positions	
Title	Details	US Christ	US Holiday
This Is What Christmas Feels Like (with Forrest Frank)	Released: December 5, 2025; Label: JVKE, AWAL; Formats: Digital download, streaming	7	44

=== Extended plays ===
Title	Details
The Asia Tour: Blooming Season EP	Released: August 15, 2025; Label: Jvke Music, Liquid State; Formats: Digital download, streaming

=== Compilation albums ===
List of compilations with notes
Title	Details
This Is What Falling in Love Feels Like (554 Hz)	Released: October 3, 2022; Label: Jvke Music, AWAL; Formats: streaming; Track listing: 1. "This Is What Falling In Love Feels Like"; 2. "Moon and Back"; 3. "Golden Hour"
This Is What Heartbreak Feels Like (432 Hz)	Released: October 4, 2022; Label: Jvke Music, AWAL; Formats: streaming; Track listing: 1. "This Is What Heartbreak Feels Like"; 2. "I'm Not Okay"; 3. "Ghost Town"
This Is What Sadness Feels Like (214 Hz)	Released: October 5, 2022; Label: Jvke Music, AWAL; Formats: streaming; Track listing: 1. "This Is What Sadness Feels Like"; 2. "Wonder If She Loves Me"; 3. "Save Your Breath"
This Is What Falling Out of Love Feels Like (392 Hz)	Released: October 6, 2022; Label: Jvke Music, AWAL; Formats: streaming; Track listing: 1. "This Is What Falling Out of Love Feels Like"; 2. "Catch Me"; 3. "I Can't Help It"

=== Singles ===
==== As lead artist ====
List of singles as lead artist, with selected chart positions and certifications, showing year released and album name
Title	Year	Peak chart positions										Certifications	Album
Title	Year	US	AUS	CAN	GER	IRE	NL	NZ	SWI	UK	WW	Certifications	Album
"Upside Down" (solo or featuring Charlie Puth)	2020	—	—	—	—	—	—	—	—	—	—	MC: Gold	Non-album singles
"Dandelion" (with Galantis)	2021	—	—	—	—	—	—	— (Note: "Dandelion" did not enter the NZ Top 40 Singles Chart but peaked at number 31 on the NZ Hot Singles Chart.)	—	—	—		Non-album singles
"This Is What Falling in Love Feels Like"	2021	—	—	—	—	—	—	—	—	—	—	RIAA: Platinum; BPI: Silver; MC: Gold; RMNZ: Gold	This Is What ____ Feels Like (Vol. 1–4)
"Golden Hour"	2022	10	29	19	66	25	62	28	47	19	13	RIAA: 5× Platinum; ARIA: 5× Platinum; BPI: Platinum; RMNZ: 3× Platinum	This Is What ____ Feels Like (Vol. 1–4)
"Hero" (with Martin Garrix)	2022	—	—	—	—	—	— (Note: "Hero" did not enter the Single Top 100, but peaked at number one on the Single Tip chart.)	— (Note: "Hero" did not enter the NZ Top 40 Singles Chart, but peaked at number 31 on the NZ Hot Singles Chart.)	—	—	—		Marvel Snap
"This Is What Heartbreak Feels Like" (Note: "This Is What Heartbreak Feels Like" was originally released as a promotional single on March 31, 2022 before impacting US contemporary hit radio on February 28, 2023 as an official single.)	2023	—	—	—	—	—	—	—	—	—	—	RIAA: Platinum; BPI: Silver	This Is What ____ Feels Like (Vol. 1–4)
"This Is What Losing Someone Feels Like"	2023	—	—	—	—	—	—	— (Note: "This Is What Losing Someone Feels Like" did not enter the NZ Top 40 Singles Chart, but peaked at number 24 on the NZ Hot Singles Chart.)	—	—	—		Non-album single
"With All My Heart" (with Illenium)	2023	— (Note: "With All My Heart" did not enter the Billboard Hot 100, but reached number 12 on the Billboard US Dance Digital/Electronic Digital Songs chart.)	—	—	—	—	—	—	—	—	—		Illenium
"Fool 4 U" (with Galantis featuring Enisa)	2023	—	—	—	—	—	—	—	—	—	—		Non-album singles
"Angel Pt. 2" (featuring Jimin, Charlie Puth and Muni Long)	2023	—	—	—	—	—	—	— (Note: "Angel Pt. 2" did not enter the NZ Top 40 Singles Chart, but peaked at number 23 on the NZ Hot Singles Chart.)	—	—	—		Non-album singles
"This Is What Autumn Feels Like"	2023	—	—	—	—	—	—	—	—	—	—		Non-album singles
"This Is What Space Feels Like"	2023	—	—	—	—	—	—	—	—	—	—		Non-album singles
"This Is What Winter Feels Like"	2024	—	—	—	—	—	—	—	—	—	—		Non-album singles
"Lavender" (featuring Pink Sweats)	2024	—	—	—	—	—	—	—	—	—	—		Non-album singles
"Don't Let Me Down" (with Surfaces)	2024	—	—	—	—	—	—	—	—	—	—		Good Morning
"Clouds"	2024	—	—	—	—	—	—	—	—	—	—		Non-album singles
"This Is What Slow Dancing Feels Like"	2024	—	—	—	—	—	—	—	—	—	—		Non-album singles
"Mi Amor" (with Sam Feldt and Anitta)	2024	—	—	—	—	—	70	—	—	—	—		Time After Time
"Never Get Used to This" (with Forrest Frank)	2024	— (Note: "Never Get Used to This" did not enter the Billboard Hot 100, but peaked at No. 6 on the Hot Christian Songs chart.)	—	—	—	—	—	— (Note: "Never Get Used to This" did not enter the NZ Top 40 Singles Chart, but peaked at number 39 on the NZ Hot Singles Chart.)	—	—	—		Child of God
"Her" (original or with Zac Lawson)	2024	—	—	—	—	—	—	—	—	—	—		Non-album singles
"This Is What Forever Feels Like" (with Nick Jonas)	2024	—	—	—	—	—	—	— (Note: "This Is What Forever Feels Like" did not enter the NZ Top 40 Singles Chart, but peaked at number 30 on the NZ Hot Singles Chart.)	—	—	—		Non-album singles
"Pretty"	2025	—	—	—	—	—	—	— (Note: "Pretty" did not enter the NZ Top 40 Singles Chart, but peaked at number 37 on the NZ Hot Singles Chart.)	—	—	—		Non-album singles
"This Is What Floating Feels Like" (with Tori Kelly)	2025	—	—	—	—	—	—	—	—	—	—		Non-album singles
"This Is What Heartbreak Feels Like" (Remix) (with CG5)	2025	—	—	—	—	—	—	—	—	—	—		Non-album singles
"Butterflies" (featuring Taehyun and Kim Chaewon)	2025	—	—	—	—	—	—	—	—	—	—		Non-album singles
"Easy" (featuring Lay)	2025	—	—	—	—	—	—	—	—	—	—		The Asia Tour: Blooming Season EP
"Oh to Be Loved"	2025	—	—	—	—	—	—	—	—	—	—		Non-album single
"Defenseless"	2025	—	—	—	—	—	—	—	—	—	—		Non-album single
"Juliet" (with Bryant Barnes and Emilio Piano)	2026	—	—	—	—	—	—	—	—	—	—		Non-album single
"—" denotes a recording that did not chart or was not released in that country.

==== As featured artist ====
List of singles as featured artist, showing year released and album name
Title	Year	Peak chart positions								Album
Title	Year	US	CAN	IRE	JPN	KOR	NZ Hot	UK	WW	Album
"U Love U" (Jax featuring Jvke)	2022	—	—	—	—	—	—	—	—	Non-album single
"Angel Pt. 1" (Kodak Black and NLE Choppa featuring Jimin, Jvke, and Muni Long)	2023	65	63	99	88	88	6	82	16	Fast X: Original Motion Picture Soundtrack
"Strings" (Max featuring Jvke and Bazzi)	2023	—	—	—	—	—	30	—	—	Love in Stereo
"Broken Melodies" (NCT Dream featuring Jvke)	2023	—	—	—	—	—	—	—	—	Non-album single
"Fire!" (Alan Walker featuring Yuqi and Jvke)	2023	—	—	—	—	— (Note: "Fire!" did not enter the Circle Digital Chart but peaked at number 143 on the component Download Chart.)	—	—	—	Walkerworld 2.0
"—" denotes a recording that did not chart or was not released in that country.

==== Promotional singles ====
List of promotional singles, showing year released and album name
Title	Year	Peak chart positions	Album
Title	Year	US Christ	Album
"Home"	2021	—	Non-album promotional singles
"Secrets"	2021	—	Non-album promotional singles
"Brand New Day"	2021	—	Clifford the Big Red Dog film soundtrack
"Anxiety"	2021	—	Non-album promotional singles
"Charger" (with Chillpill)	2022	—	Non-album promotional singles
"I Can't Help It"	2022	—	This Is What ____ Feels Like (Vol. 1–4)
"Christmas Morning" (with Forrest Frank)	2025	10	This Is What Christmas Feels Like
"Her" (with Forrest Frank)	2025	30	This Is What Christmas Feels Like
"This Is What a New Year Feels Like" (with Forrest Frank)	2025	33	This Is What Christmas Feels Like
"—" denotes a recording that did not chart or was not released in that country.

=== Other charted songs ===
List of promotional singles, showing year released and album name
Title	Year	Peak chart positions	Album
Title	Year	US Christ	Album
"This Is What Christmas Feels Like" (with Forrest Frank)	2025	14	This Is What Christmas Feels Like
"Christmas Through Your Eyes" (with Forrest Frank)	2025	17	This Is What Christmas Feels Like
"Shine Your Light" (with Forrest Frank)	2025	22	This Is What Christmas Feels Like
"The Cozy Part" (with Forrest Frank)	2025	29	This Is What Christmas Feels Like
"CHRISTmas" (with Forrest Frank)	2025	16	This Is What Christmas Feels Like

=== Other appearances ===
List of non-single album appearances, showing year released and album name
Title	Year	Album
"Remind Me" (Andy Mineo featuring Jvke)	2021	Never Land II
"XO (Only If You Say Yes) (English Ver.)" (Enhypen featuring Jvke)	2024	Romance: Untold

== Awards and nominations ==
Award	Year	Category	Recipient(s) and nominee(s)	Result	Ref.
iHeartRadio Music Awards	2023	Social Star Award	Himself	Won	
MTV Video Music Awards	2023	Push Performance of the Year	"Golden Hour"	Nominated	
MTV Video Music Awards Japan	2023	Best New Artist Video (International)	"Golden Hour"	Won	
