= Gut Punch =

2026 single by Nick Jonas

- Promotional poster for the music video

Single by Nick Jonas

from the album Sunday Best
- Released: January 1, 2026
- Length: 3:08
- Label: Republic
- Songwriters: N. Jonas; Bianca "Blush" Atterberry; Arnthor Birgisson; Ryan Daly; Josette Maskin; Ina Wroldsen
- Producer: Ryan Daly

Nick Jonas singles chronology
| "This Is What Forever Feels Like" (2024) | "Gut Punch" (2026) | "The Author" (2026) |

Music video
- "Gut Punch" on YouTube

"Gut Punch" is a song by the American singer-songwriter Nick Jonas. It was released on January 1, 2026, through Republic Records as the first single from his fifth studio album, Sunday Best.

== Background ==
During the course of the Jonas20: Greetings from Your Hometown Tour, more dates were announced, including Nick Jonas' Sunday Best Brunch, an intimate performance hosted by Jonas and held on November 30, 2025, where he announced his upcoming fifth studio album, Sunday Best. During the event, the singer performed songs from the upcoming album.

== Release ==
"Gut Punch" was released as the album's first single from the album Sunday Best on January 1, 2026. The announcement was made at one of the Sunday Best Brunch events held by Jonas in Toronto on December 14, 2025.

== Live performances ==
The song made its live debut at the Sunday Best Brunch, on November 30, 2025, in Las Vegas. The song was also performed live during the Baltimore stop of the Jonas20: Greetings from Your Hometown Tour.

== Charts ==
Weekly chart performance for "Gut Punch"
| Chart (2026) | Peak position |
|---|---|
| Guatemala Anglo Airplay (Monitor Latino) | 9 |
| New Zealand Hot Singles (RMNZ) | 19 |
| Peru Anglo Airplay (Monitor Latino) | 11 |
| South Korea BGM (Circle) | 198 |
| Suriname (Nationale Top 40) | 25 |
| US Digital Song Sales (Billboard) | 22 |
