= Spaceman (Nick Jonas album) =

2021 studio album by Nick Jonas

- Standard cover

Studio album by Nick Jonas
- Released: March 12, 2021
- Studio: No Expectations (Los Angeles)
- Length: 35:31
- Label: Island
- Producer: Greg Kurstin

Nick Jonas chronology
Last Year Was Complicated (2016)	Spaceman (2021)	Sunday Best (2026)

Singles from Spaceman
- 1. "Spaceman" Released: February 25, 2021; 2. "This Is Heaven" Released: March 4, 2021

Spaceman is the fourth studio album by American singer-songwriter Nick Jonas, released on March 12, 2021, through Island Records. The album marks the first solo release of the singer since Last Year Was Complicated (2016) and the first solo project to be released since the reunion of the Jonas Brothers (with his older brothers Joe and Kevin) in 2019. The deluxe edition of the album was released on March 15, 2021, three days after the release of the standard edition. It features a sole guest appearance from the Jonas Brothers, who appear on the track "Selfish", with Joe providing vocals and Kevin playing guitar on the song.

== Background ==
Jonas first dropped hints about his upcoming album on his social media in early February 2021. On February 20, 2021, it was announced that he would appear on Saturday Night Live on February 27 to perform his new single. The singer officially kicked off the era on February 25 by releasing the lead single, the title track. The lyrics were widely considered to be about the COVID-19 pandemic. When asked about the title during an interview with Zane Lowe, he explained, "The key for me was trying to find a way to give this idea a persona, give it a name. So 'Spaceman' kind of came into my mind as I was thinking, 'What's the one thing that all of us have felt during this time? Completely disconnected from the world." Regarding the recording process of the album, he revealed, "I made this album while doing what most of us have been doing this past year, sitting at home and hoping for better days ahead". Thematically, the album explores four themes: distance, indulgence, euphoria and commitment. The second and final single, "This Is Heaven", was released on March 4. On March 14, Jonas announced that the deluxe version of the record would be released the following day. This version includes the songs "Dangerous", "Selfish" (featuring the Jonas Brothers) as well as "Chill Versions" of the songs "Don't Give Up on Us", "2Drunk", and "This Is Heaven." On March 18, the deluxe video album was released.

== Commercial performance ==
Spaceman debuted at number 12 on the US Billboard 200 and number 8 on the Top Tastemaker Albums chart selling 16,000 pure album sales.

== Critical reception ==
Professional ratings
Aggregate scores
Source	Rating
Metacritic	61/100
Review scores
Source	Rating
auspOp	5/5 stars
Clash	7/10
i	3/5 stars
The Independent	3/5 stars
Pitchfork	5.8/10
PopMatters	6/10

Spaceman garnered positive reviews from music critics. At Metacritic, which assigns a normalized rating out of 100 to reviews from mainstream critics, the album received an average score of 61, based on 6 reviews.

Robin Murray of Clash wrote that despite the sonic influences being too obvious throughout the record, he praised its honest lyricism and effective jams, singling out "Don't Give Up On Us" for being one of Jonas' "best solo performances to date", concluding that: "One of his most rounded and adult statements to date, 'Spaceman' is certainly worth exploring - as lockdown hobbies go, it's up there with banana bread as one of the most tasteful." PopMatters contributor Jeffrey Davies commended Kurstin's production for being "captivating and refined" and Jonas being able to sell the album's theme of isolation, but felt the lyrical content comes across as "immature and tone-deaf" when compared to the title track, saying that "he has the ability to be audibly subversive and memorable, delivering sounds that could easily transport the pop music fan to an imaginary dancefloor. It’s just the words that still need some work, perhaps by beginning to hold male pop stars to a bit of a higher standard." Oliva Horn of Pitchfork wrote that: "[T]he album's interstellar concept is interesting enough to get it off the ground, but too quickly Jonas retreats to his domestic comforts, without really probing the relationship that so inspires him, or charting any new territory in the pop universe. It's hard to imagine anyone who wasn't already a Nick Jonas fan playing this album on repeat. His brand may sell, but this music is less desirable."

== Track listing ==
Spaceman track listing
No.	Title	Length
1.	"Don't Give Up On Us"	3:22
2.	"Heights"	3:37
3.	"Spaceman"	3:17
4.	"2Drunk"	3:12
5.	"Delicious"	2:58
6.	"This Is Heaven"	3:35
7.	"Sexual"	3:36
8.	"Deeper Love"	2:55
9.	"If I Fall"	3:59
10.	"Death Do Us Part"	2:09
11.	"Nervous"	2:55
Total length:		35:35

Digital deluxe track listing
No.	Title	Length
12.	"Selfish" (featuring Jonas Brothers)	3:07
13.	"Dangerous"	3:31
14.	"Don't Give Up On Us" (chill version)	3:24
15.	"2Drunk" (chill version)	3:19
16.	"This Is Heaven" (chill version)	3:39
Total length:		52:37

Deluxe video album track listing
No.	Title	Length
17.	"This Is Heaven" (music video)	3:53
18.	"Spaceman" (music video)	4:15
19.	"2Drunk" (lyric video)	3:12
20.	"This Is Heaven" (lyric video)	3:34
21.	"Spaceman" (lyric video)	3:17
Total length:		71:00

Notes

- All tracks are written by Nick Jonas, Greg Kurstin and Mozella, except "Deeper Love" (written with Michael Jones) and "Selfish" (written by N. Jonas, Kevin Jonas, Jason Evigan, Jordan K. Johnson, Marcus Lomax, Ryan Tedder and Stefan Johnson).
- All tracks are produced by Kurstin, except "Selfish", which is produced by Evigan and the Monsters & Strangerz.
- "Deeper Love" interpolates "I Want to Know What Love Is", written by Mick Jones.

Track-listing variants

- Target-exclusive edition features the standard track list, plus "chill versions" of "Heights" and "Nervous", as bonus tracks.
- On March 11, 2021, a day before the official album released, the Classics Edition of the record was released online. It contains the standard Spaceman track list, plus the singles "Chains", "Jealous", "Levels" and "Close", featuring Swedish singer Tove Lo.

== Personnel ==
Track numbers refer to the deluxe edition.

Musicians

- Nick Jonas – vocals (all tracks), programming (1), keyboards (4), piano (7), guitar (12)
- Greg Kurstin – drums, keyboards, programming (1–11, 13); guitar (1, 4–6, 8–10), percussion (1–11), piano (1, 4, 8, 9), acoustic guitar, bass (3); electric sitar (7)
- Priyanka Chopra-Jonas – background vocals (2)
- Davion Farris – background vocals (6–8)
- Jackie Gouche – background vocals (6–8)
- Mozella – background vocals (9)
- Joe Jonas – vocals (12)
- Kevin Jonas – guitar (2)
- Jason Evigan – background vocals, bass, drums, guitar, keyboards, percussion, programming (12)
- Ryan Tedder – background vocals (12)
- The Monsters & Strangerz – drums, keyboards, percussion, programming (12)

Technical

- Randy Merrill – mastering engineer
- Serban Ghenea – mixer (1–11, 13), vocal mixer (14–16)
- Josh Gudwin – mixer (12)
- Alex Ghenea – mixer (14–16)
- John Hanes – mix engineer (1–11, 13–16)
- Greg Kurstin – recording engineer (1–11, 13–16)
- Julian Berg – recording engineer (1–11, 13–16)
- Gian Stone – recording engineer, vocal producer (12)
- Jason Evigan – recording engineer, vocal producer (12)
- The Monsters & Strangerz – vocal producer (12)
- Wendy Wang – remixer (14–16)
- Heidi Wang – assistant mixer (12)

== Charts ==
Chart performance for Spaceman
Chart (2021)	Peak position
Canadian Albums (Billboard)	55
Scottish Albums (OCC)	27
Spanish Albums (Promusicae)	74
UK Albums (OCC)	69
US Billboard 200	12
US Indie Store Album Sales (Billboard)	8
