= Sunday Best (album) =

2026 studio album by Nick Jonas

- Standard cover

Studio album by Nick Jonas
- Released: February 6, 2026
- Length: 37:27
- Label: Republic
- Producer: James Amaradio; Matt Bronleewe; Ryan Daly; Tommy English; Kevin Farzad; Jeff Gitelman; Jeremy Hatcher; Joel Little

Nick Jonas chronology
Spaceman (2021)	Sunday Best (2026)	Power Ballad (Music From The Motion Picture) (2026)

Singles from Sunday Best
- 1. "Gut Punch" Released: January 1, 2026

Sunday Best is the fifth studio album by the American singer-songwriter Nick Jonas, released on February 6, 2026, through Republic Records. The album contains a sole guest appearance from his band the Jonas Brothers, which includes his older brothers Joe and Kevin Jonas. Production was handled by Ryan Daly, Tommy English, Jeremy Hatcher, James Amaradio, Kevin Farzad, Joel Little, Jeff Gitelman, and Matt Bronleewe.

The album was preceded by the release of the lead single, "Gut Punch", released on New Years Day 2026. On February 10, 2026, Jonas released a deluxe version of the album, containing two new tracks and a live rendition of the lead single.

== Background and conception ==
I'm so excited to share these new stories, candid thoughts, quiet walks home in the city, and snapshots of my life over these past few years [...] And while this album was made over the course of the last two years, it was truly 33 years in the making.

— Nick Jonas on developing Sunday Best, via Republic Records press release.

On March 12, 2021, Nick Jonas released his fourth studio album, Spaceman. The record was released during the COVID-19 pandemic. After that, Jonas resumed work with the Jonas Brothers, when they started working on what would become the band's sixth studio album, titled The Album, released on May 12, 2023. To support the album, as well as their previous four albums, the band embarked on a world tour, Five Albums. One Night. The World Tour (2023-2024).

On May 29, 2025, the Jonas Brothers confirmed the release of their seventh studio album Greetings from Your Hometown. It was released on August 8, 2025. The brothers then announced that they would embark on another concert tour, Jonas20: Greetings from Your Hometown Tour. The tour was created in celebration of the 20th anniversary of the Jonas Brothers. During the course of the tour, more dates were announced, including Nick Jonas' Sunday Best Brunch, an intimate performance hosted by Jonas and held on November 30, 2025, where the album was announced. It took place at Nellie's Southern Kitchen in Las Vegas. During the event, the singer performed songs from the upcoming album.

Jonas described the album as centering around love, with its lyrics diving into important chapters of his life, exploring his journey as a musician and the new life perspective he has gained both as a parent and a husband.

== Release and promotion ==
Sunday Best was released on February 6, 2026, through Republic Records.

=== Singles and other songs ===
On December 14, 2025, ahead of his Sunday Best Brunch event in Toronto, Canada, Jonas shared that the album's first single, "Gut Punch", would be released on New Year's Day. The music video for the song, directed by Anthony Mandler, was released alongside the album, on February 6, 2026. The singer released a remixed version of the song "Hope", featuring the American singer-songwriter Brandon Lake, on May 1, 2026.

=== Tour ===
On April 22, 2026, Jonas announced A Night with Nick, a series of intimate performances set to take place on the East Coast, from June 4, 2026, at Fallsview Casino Resort, in Niagara Falls, New York, to June 13, 2026, at Hard Rock in Atlantic City, New Jersey, consisting of 6 concerts. The shows will showcase songs from Sunday Best, as well as songs from previous records from Jonas' solo career.

== Critical reception ==
Professional ratings
Review scores
Source	Rating
AllMusic	4/5 stars
Euphoria	4/5 stars
InMusic	7.4/10
PopMatters	8/10
Riff	8/10
Showbiz by PS	4.3/10

Upon release, Sunday Best received mostly positive reviews from critics. Matt Collar from AllMusic wrote that the album has a "stripped-down and affecting emotional honesty". The author also commented on the more "mature sophistication" production of the album and complimented it for being the "softest, and most emotionally candid and heartfelt" of Jonas' career. Writing for Riff, Mike DeWald called the album Jonas' "most grounded solo statement", noting its mature tone and personal lyrics. He complimented the singer's vocal performance and the song's production and commented that Sunday Best "carries a relaxed, coffeehouse vibe filled with bright, uplifting material". Writing for PopMatters, Jeffrey Davies named Sunday Best as Jonas' "strongest music to date" and him "finally sounding at home in himself". The writer, who praised the record's stripped down production and Jonas' mature vocal performance, also marked "The Greatest" and "Princesses" as standouts on the record.

Eryn Murphy of Euphoria stated that the album presented the best vocal performance of Jonas' career. In her review, she wrote that Sunday Best was entertaining, showcasing a more reflective and personal side from the artist, even though she felt that it did not "catapult Jonas to new heights", unlike his past albums. Melodic's Reagan Denning found that the album showcased Jonas at his most open and vulnerable as he has ever been. She praised the lyrics for reflecting the singer's current phase in his personal life, with themes of fatherhood, marriage, his personal struggles, and his 20-year career. The writer highlighted the songs "Sweet to Me", "Gut Punch", and "The Greatest" as recommended tracks. InMusic called the record "reflective and emotionally grounded", with its themes revolving around "meditation on love, responsibility, faith, and identity". The website ranked the single "Gut Punch" as the best song on the record, whilst the song "911" was placed last.

Writing for Showbiz by PS, Roman Kamshin offered a more critical perspective, describing Sunday Best as a deliberately cautious adult-contemporary record that leans heavily on familiar millennial pop aesthetics, praising moments like "Seeing Ghosts" while ultimately noting a lack of artistic evolution and emotional depth.

== Commercial performance ==
In the United States, Sunday Best debuted at number 30 on the Billboard 200 chart, marking Jonas' lowest entry on the chart to date. The album debuted at number 6 on Billboard's Top Album Sales chart. It also debuted at number 8 on Billboard's Top Vinyl Albums chart, making it the first entry of Jonas' career.

== Track listing ==
Sunday Best track listing
No.	Title	Writer(s)	Producer(s)	Length
1.	"Sweet to Me"	Nicholas Jonas; Ryan Daly; Josette Maskin; JP Saxe; Dewain Whitmore Jr.	Daly	4:17
2.	"Handprints"	N. Jonas; Paris Carney; Tommy English; Saxe	English; Jeremy Hatcher	3:44
3.	"I Need You"	N. Jonas; Daly; Maskin; Saxe; Whitmore	Daly	3:04
4.	"You Got Me"	N. Jonas; Carney; English; Saxe	English; Hatcher	2:41
5.	"Gut Punch"	N. Jonas; Bianca "Blush" Atterberry; Arnthor Birgisson; Daly; Maskin; Ina Wroldsen	Daly	3:08
6.	"Hope"	N. Jonas; Carney; Daly	Daly	4:00
7.	"Seeing Ghosts"	N. Jonas; Carney; English; Saxe	English; Hatcher	3:14
8.	"Aphrodite"	N. Jonas; Delacey Amaradio; James Amaradio	J. Amaradio; Kevin Farzad	2:32
9.	"911"	N. Jonas; English; Shay Mooney; Whitmore	English; Hatcher	3:53
10.	"The Greatest" (featuring Jonas Brothers)	N. Jonas; Joe Jonas; Kevin Jonas; Joel Little	Little	3:35
11.	"Princesses"	N. Jonas; Jeff Gitelman; Saxe	Gitelman	3:19
Total length:				37:27

Deluxe edition bonus tracks
No.	Title	Writer(s)	Producer(s)	Length
12.	"London Foolishly"	N. Jonas	English; Hatcher	3:21
13.	"While You're Gone"	N. Jonas; Matt Bronleewe	Bronleewe	3:10
14.	"Gut Punch" (live)	N. Jonas; Atterberry; Birgisson; Wroldsen; Maskin; Daly		3:13
Total length:				47:11

Digital edition bonus track
No.	Title	Writer(s)	Length
12.	"Intro to I Need You"	N. Jonas	0:17
Total length:			37:44

== Personnel ==
Credits adapted from Tidal.

=== Musicians ===
- Nick Jonas – vocals (all tracks), guitar (track 1), bass (9); piano (10, 14); background vocals (10)
- Nikki Leonti – background vocals (1–7, 9, 11, 12, 13)
- Ryan Edgar – background vocals (1–7, 9, 11, 12, 13)
- JP Saxe – piano (1, 3, 4), background vocals (4, 7), guitar (4), Rhodes (7)
- Josette Maskin – guitar (1)
- Jeremy Hatcher – bass (2, 4, 7); Mellotron, slide guitar (2); guitar, piano (4); programming (7), electric guitar (9, 12)
- Tommy English – guitar (2, 4, 7, 9, 12), Mellotron (9)
- Ulf Wahlgren – drums (2, 4, 7, 9, 12)
- Allie Stamler – strings (2, 4, 9)
- Morgan Paros – strings (2, 4, 9, 12)
- Ryan Daly – programming (3, 5, 6)
- Paris Carney – background vocals (4, 6)
- Blush – background vocals (5)
- Cole Kamen-Green – horn arrangement, trumpet (7)
- Evan Smith – baritone saxophone, tenor saxophone (7)
- Delacey – background vocals (8)
- James Amaradio – background vocals, drums, electric bass guitar, electric guitar, keyboards (8)
- Dewain Whitmore Jr. – background vocals (9)
- Mark Joseph – background vocals (9, 14)
- KellyeAnn Rodgers – background vocals (9, 14)
- Joel Little – bass, drum programming, guitar, keyboards, string arrangement (10)
- Ben Barter – drums (10)
- Joe Jonas – vocals (10)
- Jeff Gitelman – bass, drum programming, guitar, piano, string arrangement, synthesizer (11)
- Drew McKeon – drums (11)
- Josette Maskin – guitar (11)
- Bpage – strings (11)
- Jack Lawless – drums (14)
- JinJoo Lee – guitar (14)
- Daniel Byrne – guitar (14)
- Tyler Carroll – bass (14)
- Michael Wooten – keyboards (14)

=== Technical ===
- Ryan Daly – engineering (1, 3, 5)
- Jeremy Hatcher – engineering (2, 4, 7, 9)
- Tommy English – engineering (2, 4, 7, 9)
- Rachel White – engineering (2, 4, 9)
- Ben Barter – engineering (10)
- Joel Little – engineering (10)
- Jeff Gitelman – engineering (11)
- RJ Cardenas – engineering (11)
- Rob Kinelski – mixing, immersive mixing (1, 3, 6, 9, 11)
- Pedro Calloni – mixing, immersive mixing (2, 4, 11)
- Tony Maserati – mixing, immersive mixing (7, 8, 10)
- Adam Hawkins – mixing (5)
- Gabriella Wayne – mixing assistance (7, 8, 10)
- Dale Becker – mastering (1–14)
- Adam Robinson – mixing (14)
- James Krausse – immersive mixing (14)

== Charts ==
Chart performance for Sunday Best
Chart (2026)	Peak position
Australian Albums (ARIA)	65
Belgian Albums (Ultratop Flanders)	148
Scottish Albums (OCC)	74
UK Albums Sales (OCC)	32
US Billboard 200	30

== Release history ==
Sunday Best release history
Region	Date	Format(s)	Edition(s)	Label	Ref.
Various	February 6, 2026	CD; vinyl LP; streaming	Standard	Republic	
United States	February 6, 2026	CD; vinyl LP	Limited-run alternative cover	Republic	
