= Nick Jonas: Live in Concert =

2015 concert tour by Nick Jonas

- Continental tour by Nick Jonas
- Promotional poster for the tour
- Location: North America
- Associated album: Nick Jonas
- Start date: August 8, 2015
- End date: October 25, 2015
- Legs: 2
- No. of shows: 28 in North America; 28 total

Nick Jonas concert chronology
- Nick Jonas Live (2014); Nick Jonas Live in Concert (2015); Future Now Tour (2016)

Nick Jonas: Live in Concert is the second headlining concert tour by American singer Nick Jonas, promoting his second studio album, Nick Jonas. The tour began on August 8, 2015, in Santo Domingo, Dominican Republic and ended on October 25, 2015, in San Francisco, California.

== Background ==
On May 18, 2015, just one day after the 2015 Billboard Music Awards, where he performed his Double Platinum hit song "Jealous", Jonas announced a new tour across North America to support his eponymous studio album. Alongside of his headlining concert tour endeavors, Nick Jonas opened for Maroon 5's Maroon V Tour on August 15, 2015. He was scheduled to open the October dates for American singer Kelly Clarkson's upcoming Piece by Piece Tour in Canada, but the remainder of the tour was canceled when Clarkson was put on vocal rest by her doctors.

== Opening acts ==
- Popstar The Band (San Juan)
- Bebe Rexha (North America)
- Cassio Monroe (Utica)

== Set list ==
This set list is representative of the performance on September 14, 2015. It is not representative of all concerts for the duration of the tour.

1. "Chains"
2. "Numb"
3. "Levels"
4. "Wilderness"
5. "Good Thing"
6. "I Want You"
7. "Who I Am"
8. "A Little Bit Longer"
9. "Warning"
10. "Push"
11. "Santa Barbara"
12. "Under You"
13. "Roses" (OutKast cover)
14. "Can't Feel My Face (The Weeknd cover)
15. "Teacher"
16. "Take Over"
17. "Jealous"

=== Notes ===
- On August 9, Nick performed "Give Love a Try", "Who I Am", "Introducing Me", OMI's "Cheerleader" and the Jonas Brothers' "S.O.S"..
- On September 5, he performed Bel Biv DeVoe's "Poison" and The Weeknd's "Can't Feel My Face"
- On September 7, he performed a new song called "Don't Make Me Choose" and OutKast's Caroline.
- On September 15, he performed Who I Am and Introducing Me after A Little Bit Longer.
- On September 19, during the iHeartRadio Music Festival, Nick performed both during the day and evening the songs: Chains, Numb, Levels, Teacher/Poison, Jealous.
- On September 20, he performed Teacher in a mashup with both Poison and Can't Feel My Face.
- On September 22, he performed acoustic versions of Give Love a Try and Who I Am.
- On September 27, he performed A Little Bit Longer, Who I Am and Rose Garden and also covered Silentó's Watch Me (Whip/Nae Nae).
- On September 29, he performed Who I Am, Last Time Around and also a cover of Drake's Hotline Bling.
- On October 1, he performed Levels at We Day Toronto.
- On October 20, he performed Levels at Tidal X 1020.
- On October 24, he performed Chains, Good Thing, Levels, Teacher/Poison, Jealous at We Can Survive 2015.
- On October 24, he performed Chains, Levels and Jealous at the 2015 Maxim Halloween Party.

== Tour dates ==
List of concerts, showing date, city, country, venue.
Date	City	Country	Venue
North America
August 8, 2015	Santo Domingo	Dominican Republic	Anfiteatro Nuryn Sanlley
August 9, 2015	San Juan	Puerto Rico	José Miguel Agrelot Coliseum
August 30, 2015 (Note: This performance was part of the 2015 MTV Video Music Awards pre-show, where Jonas performed "Levels" for the first time.)	Los Angeles	United States	Microsoft Theater
September 5, 2015 (Note: Budweiser Made in America Festival.)	Philadelphia	United States	Benjamin Franklin Parkway
September 6, 2015	Hershey	United States	Hershey Theatre
September 7, 2015	Syracuse	United States	New York State Fair
September 9, 2015	New York City	United States	Terminal 5
September 10, 2015	Boston	United States	House of Blues Boston
September 11, 2015	Uncasville	United States	Mohegan Sun Arena
September 14, 2015	Chicago	United States	House of Blues Chicago
September 15, 2015	St. Louis	United States	The Pageant
September 19, 2015 (Note: 2015 iHeartRadio Music Festival.)	Las Vegas	United States	MGM Grand Garden Arena
September 20, 2015	Phoenix	United States	Marquee Theatre
September 22, 2015	Houston	United States	House of Blues Houston
September 23, 2015	Dallas	United States	House of Blues Dallas
September 25, 2015	Atlanta	United States	The Tabernacle
September 26, 2015	Lake Buena Vista	United States	House of Blues Orlando
September 27, 2015	Miami Beach	United States	The Fillmore Miami Beach
September 28, 2015	Fayetteville	United States	March F. Riddle Center
September 29, 2015	Silver Spring	United States	The Fillmore Silver Spring
October 1, 2015 (Note: 2015 We Day.)	Toronto	Canada	Air Canada Centre
October 2, 2015	Toronto	Canada	Phoenix Concert Theatre
October 3, 2015	Selinsgrove	United States	Susquehanna University
October 4, 2015	Utica	United States	Mohawk Valley Community College
October 20, 2015 (Note: TIDAL X: 1020 Amplified by HTC.)	Brooklyn	United States	Barclays Center
October 23, 2015	Los Angeles	United States	Wiltern Theatre
October 24, 2015 (Note: We Can Survive 2015.) (Note: 2015 The Official Maxim Halloween Party.)	Los Angeles	United States	Hollywood Bowl
October 24, 2015	Los Angeles	United States	Private Estate in Beverly Hills
October 25, 2015	San Francisco	United States	Masonic Auditorium

== Cancelled shows ==
List of cancelled concerts, showing date, city, country, venue and reason for cancellation
Date	City	Country	Venue	Reason
August 22, 2015 (Note: The August 22–23, 2015 concerts in Chelmsford and Weston-under-Lizard were a part of the 2015 V Festival.)	Weston-under-Lizard	England	Weston Park	Unforeseen work commitments
August 23, 2015	Chelmsford	England	Hylands Park	Unforeseen work commitments
September 13, 2015	Detroit	United States	The Fillmore Detroit	Scheduling conflict
September 17, 2015	Denver	United States	Fillmore Auditorium	-
