= Last Year Was Complicated =

- Standard cover (Note: The digital deluxe edition cover features the same image, but in color.)

Studio album by Nick Jonas
- Released: June 10, 2016
- Recorded: September 2014 – March 2016
- Genres: Pop; R&B
- Length: 42:34
- Labels: Island; Safehouse
- Producers: Nick Jonas; Jason Evigan; Sir Nolan; Mattman & Robin; Max Martin; Ali Payami; Shellback

Nick Jonas chronology
Nick Jonas (2014)	Last Year Was Complicated (2016)	Spaceman (2021)

Singles from Last Year Was Complicated
- 1. "Close" Released: March 25, 2016; 2. "Bacon" Released: July 12, 2016

Last Year Was Complicated is the third studio album by American singer Nick Jonas. It was released on June 10, 2016, by Island and Safehouse Records. The album features collaborations with Tove Lo, Ty Dolla Sign, and Big Sean. The album's lead single, "Close", was released on March 25, 2016.

== Background ==
"When I first started making I thought I knew what it would be about… Then I had a breakup. It then became very clear what this thing would be about… And that I would need to dig really deep… Shit is too real sometimes… Reliving some of these real life experiences through this music is hard."

— Nick Jonas, on the recording of album.

On August 5, 2015, Jonas debuted a new song, "Under You", at the iHeartRadio Music Summit. In February 2016, he covered the February/March 2016 edition of Complex magazine he mentioned the songs "Chainsaw" and "Don't Make Me Choose", and also revealed a surprising collaboration with Purity Ring's Corin Roddick. That same month, it was revealed that singer Ty Dolla $ign had a feature on the record and that there was also a female singer on the record which name he didn't reveal. He also revealed that he worked again with Jason Evigan and Sir Nolan.

On March 24, 2016, Jonas announced the album's title, release date and tracklist through a series of tweets. Jonas revealed that work on the album took him a year and a half, tweeting: "Shit is too real sometimes... Reliving some of these real life experiences through this music is hard". During a radio interview with Carson Daly, Jonas noted that the album was supposed to be named Unhinged like the song on the record. However, after a conversation with rapper Jay-Z, Jonas changed the title to Last Year Was Complicated.

== Promotion ==
Two songs of the record ("Don't Make Me Choose" and "Under You") were performed on several dates of his Nick Jonas: Live in Concert tour. In support of the album, Jonas also co-headlined the Future Now Tour (2016) alongside Demi Lovato. On the evening of March 24, 2016, Jonas previewed four tracks from Last Year Was Complicated during a listening party, held for the press and television bookers. Jonas performed the songs "Champagne Problems" and "Close" (with Tove Lo) live on Saturday Night Live on April 16, 2016. On April 24, 2016, Jonas performed the songs "Bacon", "Close" and "Voodoo" during his set at the New Orleans Jazz Fest. He announced also that there will be a music video of "Voodoo".

During the taping of CMT Crossroads he performed the songs "Chainsaw" with Thomas Rhett and "Close" with Thomas Rhett and Danielle Bradbery. He and Tove Lo are performed the song live on May 22, 2016, at the 2016 Billboard Music Awards. On April 28, Both of them performed the song on Jimmy Kimmel Live!. He performed a solo version of the song on The Ellen DeGeneres Show on May 9, 2016. Jonas also performed at the 2016 iHeartRadio Much Music Video Awards. On June 10, he performed the songs Jealous, Close, Champagne Problems and Bacon live on Today. He Performed Close, The Difference and When We Get Home at a target surprise show.

=== Singles ===
On March 24, 2016, "Close" was announced as the album's lead single. Released the following day, the song features guest vocalist, Swedish singer, Tove Lo.

"Bacon", featuring Ty Dolla $ign, was originally released as a promotional single on June 3, 2016. It was sent to US Rhythmic radio on July 12, 2016, as the album's second single, replacing "Chainsaw", which had originally been confirmed for the position. A music video of the song was released on Tidal on June 6, 2016, with a 30-second teaser available to non-subscribers.

=== Promotional singles ===
"Champagne Problems" was released as the first promotional single on April 8, 2016. On November 7 he dropped the video of the song online. "Chainsaw" was released as the second promotional single on May 13, 2016, along with the video. Its music video was released on May 13, 2016, and was directed by Luke Monaghan. The song was originally planned to be released as the second single, but was replaced by "Bacon".

=== Other songs ===
"Under You" charted at 8 on the New Zealand heatseekers chart on June 20, 2016. The video of the song was released on June 10. It's served to be released on UK radio sometime. On October 11 the video of the track "Voodoo" premiered exclusively on Tidal, with a 30-second teaser for non subscribers.

== Critical reception ==
Professional ratings
Aggregate scores
Source	Rating
Metacritic	68/100
Review scores
Source	Rating
AllMusic	3.5/5 stars
Consequence of Sound	C−
Entertainment Weekly	B+
Idolator	3.5/5 stars
The Guardian	3/5 stars
Pitchfork	6.3/10
Rolling Stone	3.5/5 stars
Slant Magazine	3.5/5 stars
Spin	7/10
USA Today	2/4 stars

Last Year Was Complicated received positive reviews from music critics. Stephen Thomas Erlewine of AllMusic claimed that the album "feels assured in a way its eponymous 2014 predecessor did not," noting that "the entirety of 'Last Year Was Complicated' walks a fine line between immaculately produced pop confection and personal confession: it may not be heartbreaking but it feels as if it comes from the heart." In his review for Entertainment Weekly, Nolan Feeney declared that it "grows into the neon pop-R&B sound of 2014’s Nick Jonas while adopting a show-don’t-tell approach to maturity on [its] songs." Keith Harris wrote for Rolling Stone that Jonas is "personable and versatile" on the record, while praising his "supple falsetto" for "sounding wounded or seductive as required, allows him to stake out his own patch of territory on the border between pop and R&B." Sam C. Mac of Slant Magazine noted that despite the break-up themes, "'Last Year Was Complicated' offers an even more vibrant collection of colorful, propulsive beats than 'Nick Jonas' did." However, he observed that "as a singer, Jonas isn't always willing to evolve with his music." Harriet Gibsone of The Guardian highlighted that "There are many quirks to this glossy, compelling record, but [...] it’s not savvy or strange enough to stand out."

== Commercial performance ==
The album debuted at number two on the Billboard 200, with first week sales of 66,000 units, being 47,000 actual album sales, that gave to him a position at number one that week on the Top Albums sales Chart, in the United States.

== Track listing ==
Last Year Was Complicated track listing
No.	Title	Writer(s)	Producer(s)	Length
1.	"Voodoo"	Nicholas Jonas; Jason Evigan; Dewain Whitmore	Evigan	3:10
2.	"Champagne Problems"	Jonas; Evigan; Sean Douglas; Jonathan Tucker; PJ Bianco	Evigan	3:12
3.	"Close" (featuring Tove Lo)	Robin Fredriksson; Mattias Larsson; Julia Michaels; Justin Tranter; Tove Nilsson	Mattman & Robin	3:54
4.	"Chainsaw"	Jonas; Nolan Lambroza; Simon Wilcox; Michaels; Douglas	Sir Nolan	3:19
5.	"Touch"	Jonas; Fredriksson; Larsson; Rico Love; Priscilla Renea; Brett James	Mattman & Robin; Love	3:02
6.	"Bacon" (featuring Ty Dolla Sign)	Jonas; Lambroza; Renea; Tyrone Griffin, Jr.	Sir Nolan	3:02
7.	"Good Girls" (featuring Big Sean)	Jonas; Evigan; Douglas; Sean Anderson	Evigan	3:56
8.	"The Difference"	Jonas; Evigan; Whitmore, Jr.	Evigan	3:41
9.	"Don't Make Me Choose"	Jonas; Lambroza; Wilcox	Sir Nolan	3:35
10.	"Under You"	Max Martin; Savan Kotecha; Rickard Göransson; Ali Payami; Bebe Rexha	Payami; Shellback; Max Martin	3:17
11.	"Unhinged"	Jonas; Lambroza; Ilsey Juber	Sir Nolan	3:52
12.	"Comfortable"	Jonas; Evigan	Jonas; Evigan	4:34
Total length:				42:34

Target deluxe edition track listing
No.	Title	Writer(s)	Producer(s)	Length
13.	"Testify"	Jonas; Greg Bonnick; Hayden Chapman; Whitmore Jr.; Patrick "J. Que" Smith	LDN Noise	3:15
14.	"When We Get Home" (featuring Daniella Mason)	Jonas; Mason; Chris Young	Jonas	3:04
15.	"That's What They All Say"	Jonas; Paul "Phamous" Shelton; Magnus "Magnify" Martinsen; Petter Walther Walthinsen; Alexander Pavlich	Most Wanted; Shelton; Martinsen; Walthinsen; Anthony Vasquez	3:03
Total length:				51:56

International deluxe edition track listing
No.	Title	Writer(s)	Producer(s)	Length
16.	"Jealous"	Jonas; Wilcox; Lambroza	Sir Nolan	3:43
17.	"Chains"	Evigan; Ammar Malik; Daniel Parker	Evigan; Jonas^{[a]}	3:23
18.	"Levels"	Douglas; Talay Riley; Ian Kirkpatrick; Marcus Lomax; Stefan Johnson; Jordan Johnson; Sam Martin	Kirkpatrick; The Monsters and the Strangerz	2:47
Total length:				61:49

Notes

- ^{^[a]} signifies a vocal producer
- "Comfortable" contains audio elements of an Allen Iverson's press conference.

== Personnel ==
Credits adapted from the standard edition of Last Year Was Complicated.

Performers and musicians

- Nick Jonas – main vocals, guitars (track 12)
- Tove Lo – featured artist (track 3)
- Ty Dolla $ign – featured artist (track 6)
- Big Sean – featured artist (track 7)
- Deanna DellaCioppa – background vocals (track 4)
- Demi Lovato – background vocals (track 12)
- Sean Douglas – additional keys (tracks 2, 8)
- Jason Evigan – all instruments (tracks 1–2, 7–8, 12)
- Rickard Göransson – bass (track 10)
- Marcus Kincy – additional keys (tracks 1, 12), piano (track 12), additional bass (track 12)
- Savan Kotecha – background vocals (track 10)
- Pierre Luc – guitars (track 2)
- Mattman & Robin – bass (tracks 3, 5), keyboards (track 3), drums and percussion (tracks 3, 5), marimba (track 3), snaps and handclaps (tracks 3, 5), synths (track 5), guitars (track 5)
- Julia Michaels – background vocals (track 3)
- Ali Payami – drums (track 10), keys (track 10), synths (track 10), bass (track 10)
- Shellback – drums (track 10), guitars (track 10)
- Dewain Whitmore Jr. – background vocals (track 8)

Production

- Cory Bice – assistant (tracks 5, 10)
- Peter Carlsson – vocal editing (track 10)
- John Cranfield – recording (track 3)
- Serge Curtois – mixing (tracks 6, 11)
- Jason Evigan – production (tracks 1–2, 7–8, 12)
- Chris Gehringer – mastering
- Serban Ghenea – mixing (tracks 2–3, 5, 8, 10)
- Jason Goldberg – mix assistant (track 12)
- Louie Gomez – mix assistant (tracks 1, 7, 12)
- John Hanes – engineered for mix (tracks 2–3, 5, 8, 10)
- Billy Hickey – engineering (track 7)
- Sam Holland – engineering (track 10)
- Maximilian Jaeger – recording (track 7)
- Nick Jonas – production (track 12)
- Rico Love – production (track 5), recording (track 5)
- Max Martin – production (track 10)
- Tony Maserati – mixing (tracks 4, 9)
- David Massey – executive production
- Mattman & Robin – production (tracks 3, 5), programming (tracks 3, 5), recording (track 5)
- Noah Passovoy – recording (track 3), engineering (track 5), recording (track 5)
- Ali Payami – production (track 10), programming (track 10)
- James Royo – engineering (tracks 1–2, 8, 12), mixing (tracks 7, 12)
- Tyler Scott – assistant mix engineer (tracks 4, 9)
- Shellback – production (track 10)
- John Shullman – engineering (track 5), recording (track 5)
- Sir Nolan – production (tracks 4, 6, 9, 11), recording (tracks 4, 6, 9, 11)
- The Struts – recording (track 3)
- Eric Weaver – engineering (track 10)

Design

- Kyledidthis – art direction, design
- Paul Lane – package production
- Yu Tsai – photography

== Charts ==
=== Weekly charts ===
Weekly chart performance for Last Year Was Complicated
Chart (2016)	Peak position
Australian Albums (ARIA)	13
Belgian Albums (Ultratop Flanders)	61
Belgian Albums (Ultratop Wallonia)	70
Canadian Albums (Billboard)	3
Danish Albums (Hitlisten)	21
Dutch Albums (Album Top 100)	63
German Albums (Offizielle Top 100)	88
Greek Albums (IFPI)	75
Irish Albums (IRMA)	26
New Zealand Albums (RMNZ)	8
Norwegian Albums (VG-lista)	27
Scottish Albums (Official Charts)	41
Spanish Albums (Promusicae)	6
Swedish Albums (Sverigetopplistan)	45
Swiss Albums (Schweizer Hitparade)	48
UK Albums (Official Charts)	25
US Billboard 200	2

=== Year-end charts ===
Year-end chart performance for Last Year Was Complicated
Chart (2016)	Position
US Billboard 200	152

== Certifications ==
Certifications and sales for “Last Year Was Complicated”
Region	Certification	Certified units/sales
New Zealand (RMNZ)	Gold	7,500^{‡}
^{‡} Sales+streaming figures based on certification alone.

== Release history ==
Country	Date	Version	Format	Label	Ref
Various	June 10, 2016	Standard; Deluxe	CD; digital download; vinyl LP	Island	
