= Campaign =

Campaign or The Campaign may refer to:

== Types of campaigns ==
- Campaign, in agriculture, the period during which sugar beets are harvested and processed
- Advertising campaign, a series of advertisement messages that share a single idea and theme
- Advocacy campaign, an organized enduring effort to enact social change or policy change on an issue
- Blitz campaign, a short, intensive, and focused marketing campaign for a product or business
- Civil society campaign, a project intended to mobilize public support in order to instigate social change
- Military campaign, large scale, long duration, significant military strategy plans incorporating a series of inter-related military operations or battles
- Political campaign, an organized effort which seeks to influence the decision making process within a specific group
- Project, an undertaking that is carefully planned to achieve a particular aim
- The period during which a blast furnace is continuously in operation.

== Places ==
- Campaign, Tennessee, an unincorporated community in the United States

== Arts, entertainment, and media ==
=== Film and television ===
- The Campaign (film), a 2012 film starring Will Ferrell and Zach Galifianakis
- "The Campaign" (Ever Decreasing Circles), a 1986 television episode
- The Campaign (What We Do in the Shadows), an episode of the American TV series What We Do in the Shadows

=== Gaming ===
- Campaign (gaming), a connected series of battles, adventures or scenarios played by the same character in a role-playing game
- Campaign (video game), 1992 computer game by Empire Software
- Campaign, the story mode of a video game; see Glossary of video game terms

=== Literature ===
- Campaign (book), a 2011 coffee table book by Shia LaBeouf and Karolyn Pho, with a long-form music video co-directed by Marilyn Manson and Shia LaBeouf
- Campaign (magazine), a British magazine serving the advertising industry
- "The Campaign", a poem by Joseph Addison
- The Campaign (play), a 1784 play by Robert Jephson

=== Music ===
- Campaign (mixtape), commercial digital album by Ty Dolla Sign, 2016
- "Campaign" (song), by Ty Dolla Sign, 2016
- The Campaign (Affiance album), 2012
- The Campaign (Into the Moat album), 2009

== See also ==
- Campaign hat, a broad-brimmed felt or straw hat, with a high crown, pinched symmetrically at the four corners
