= Champagne Problems =

Champagne Problems may refer to:

- Champagne Problems (film), 2025
- Champagne Problems (album), 2022 album by Inna released in two parts—Champagne Problems #DQH1 and Champagne Problems #DQH2
- "Champagne Problems" (Nick Jonas song), 2015
- "Champagne Problems" (Taylor Swift song), 2020
- "Champagne Problems", a song by Katy Perry from the album Smile, 2020
- "Champagne Problems", a song by Meghan Trainor from the album Thank You, 2016
