= Bacon (song) =

- Hoodboi Remix cover

Single by Nick Jonas featuring Ty Dolla $ign

from the album Last Year Was Complicated
- Released: July 12, 2016
- Genre: R&B
- Length: 3:02
- Label: Island; Safehouse
- Songwriters: Nick Jonas; Tyrone Griffin, Jr.; Priscilla Renea; Nolan Lambroza
- Producer: Sir Nolan

Nick Jonas singles chronology
"Close" (2016)	"Bacon" (2016)	"Remember I Told You" (2017)

Ty Dolla $ign singles chronology
"Campaign" (2016)	"Bacon" (2016)	"Zaddy" (2016)

Music video
- "Bacon" on YouTube

"Bacon" is a song by the American singer-songwriter Nick Jonas featuring the American singer Ty Dolla $ign. It was released on July 12, 2016, as the second single from the former's third studio album, Last Year Was Complicated. The song was written by the artists alongside Muni Long and producer Sir Nolan. "Bacon" was nominated for the 2016 MTV Video Music Awards for the category Song of Summer. It was the second consecutive year that Jonas was nominated for the award.

== Background and release ==
On March 24, 2016, Jonas announced the song as part of the track list for his new album. In March, it was revealed that singer Ty Dolla $ign had a feature on the record. According to Jonas the song is about when you are out of a relationship and you start to be okay with the fact that it's ended, saying "In my case my life was great, it’s so good that we should throw some bacon on it to make it even better". The track premiered on June 3, 2016, and was sent to US rhythmic radio on July 12, 2016, as the album's second single, replacing "Chainsaw", which had originally been confirmed for the position.

== Critical reception ==
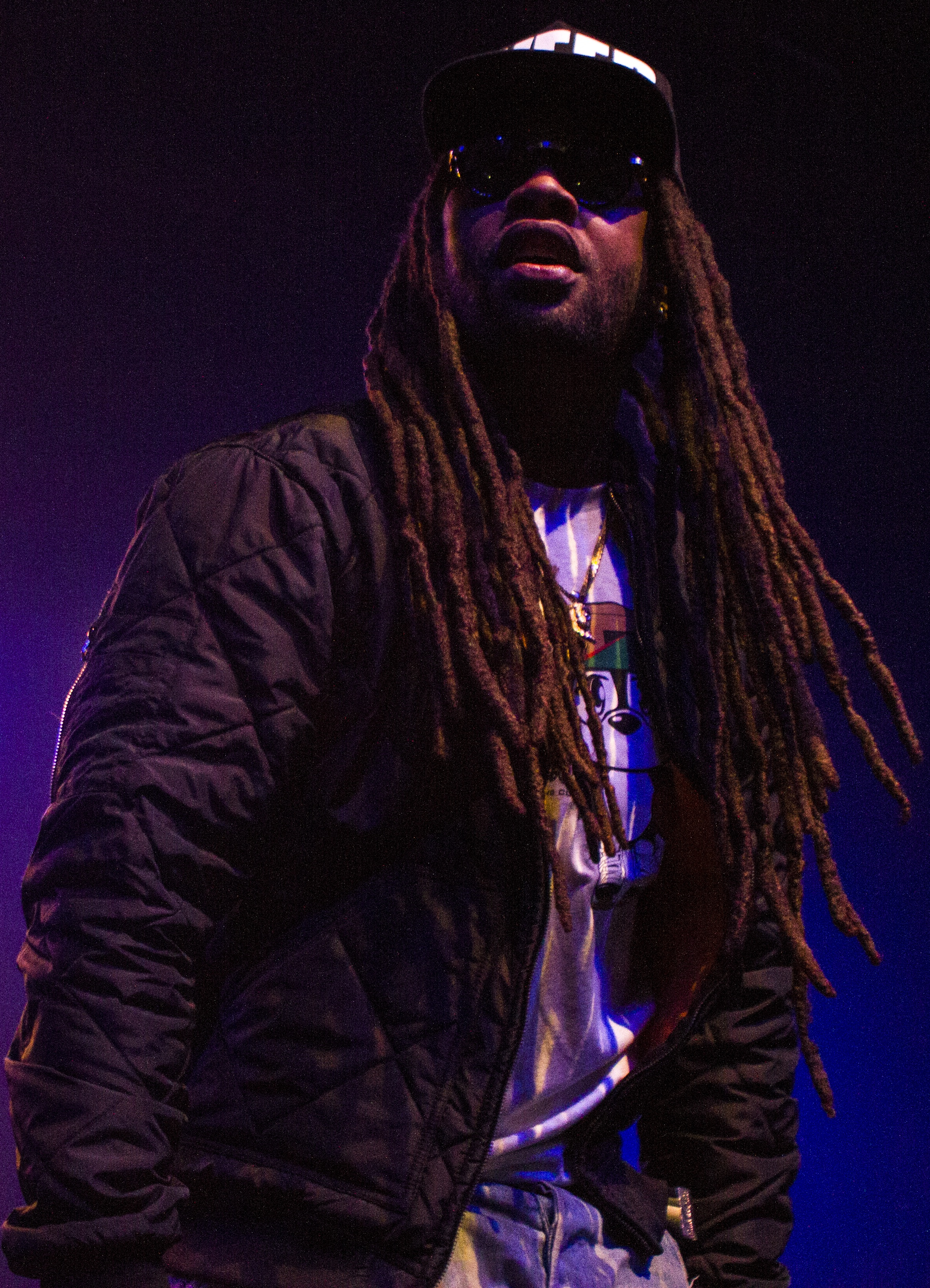
Critical response to Ty Dolla $ign's guest verse were generally positive.

Kaitlyn Tiffany of The Verge compared the song to "Lucozade" to Zayn Malik and wrote that Ty Dolla $ign's verse is "explicitly about sex, but doesn't have anything to do with bacon". Kristie Rohwedder from Bustle wrote that the song is "another reason to be stoked" for the album. Idolator's Rachel Sonis called the song "super weird", saying that "I don’t get this one". Eddie Fu from Uproxx called it a "grown and sexy R&B track", also writing that "Ty Dolla $ign has shown he’s adept at working with pop acts in the past... and the R&B singer has delivered once again". Brianna Wiest of Teen Vogue called it a "super catchy, upbeat song" that "may seem like your average, everyday, low-key newly-single anthem".

== Composition ==
"Bacon" is composed in the key of A♯ minor. The verse, pre-chorus and chorus are sung by Jonas, while Ty Dolla $ign raps during the song's bridge.

== Music video ==
A music video of the song was released on Tidal on June 6, 2016, with a 30-second teaser available to non-subscribers. The music video was filmed in New Orleans and is set in the vintage diner Ted's Frostop. It features Nick dancing with friends and eating bacon. Meanwhile, Ty Dolla $ign makes a cameo in a music video setting, complete with models and lowriders. On June 10, 2016, the music video was uploaded on Jonas' Vevo channel. Chord Overstreet of Jonas's Safehouse Records label also appears in the video.

== Commercial performance ==
The song reached the top 40 on the Mainstream Top 40 chart at number 37 and the Rhythmic Songs chart at number 35, becoming his first single to miss the top 30 on both charts. The song failed to enter the Billboard Hot 100 but reached number 20 on the Bubbling Under Hot 100 Singles chart.

== Live performance ==
On April 24, 2016, Jonas performed "Bacon" during his set at the New Orleans Jazz Festival. On June 10, 2016, he performed the songs on Today. On August 28, 2016, Jonas and Ty performed the song at the MTV Video Music Awards. On September 20, 2016, he performed the song solo on The Late Late Show with James Corden. The song is also part of the set list of his Future Now Tour.

== Track listing ==
- Digital download – remixes
1. "Bacon" (featuring Ty Dolla $ign) (Hoodboi Remix) – 4:08

== Charts ==
Chart (2016–17)	Peak position
US Bubbling Under Hot 100 (Billboard)	20
US Pop Airplay (Billboard)	37
US Rhythmic Airplay (Billboard)	35

== Certifications ==
Region	Certification	Certified units/sales
United States (RIAA)	Gold	500,000^{‡}
^{‡} Sales+streaming figures based on certification alone.

== Release history ==
Region	Date	Format	Version	Label	Ref.
Worldwide	June 3, 2016 (Note: Release as a promotional single.)	Digital download	Original	Island; Safehouse	
United States	July 12, 2016	Rhythmic contemporary	Original	Island; Safehouse	
United States	August 16, 2016	Contemporary hit radio	Original	Island; Safehouse	
United Kingdom	September 30, 2016	Digital download	Hoodboi Remix	Island; Safehouse	
United States	September 30, 2016	Digital download	Hoodboi Remix	Island; Safehouse	
