= Sir Nolan =

American songwriter and record producer

- Born: Nolan Joseph Lambroza; July 25, 1990 (age 36); Washington, D.C., U.S.
- Origin: Los Angeles, California, U.S.
- Genres: Pop; pop rock; R&B
- Occupations: Record producer; songwriter
- Label: Various

Nolan Lambroza (born July 25, 1990), better known as Sir Nolan, is an American record producer and songwriter based in Encino, Los Angeles, California. He has worked with notable artists such as Olivia Dean, Daniel Caesar, Tyla, Selena Gomez, Justin Bieber, Kalis Uchis, Kehlani, Nick Jonas, Demi Lovato, Shawn Mendes, DJ Khaled, Pitbull, Poppy, Rita Ora, Alec Benjamin, and many more.

== Personal life ==
Sir Nolan was in a three-year relationship with singer Julia Michaels, and whom she wrote Clean Bandit's song "I Miss You" about.

== Partial discography ==
- Olivia Dean - The Art of Loving
  - "Something Inbetween"
- Hope Tala - Hope Handwritten
  - "Phoenix"
- Tyla - Tyla
  - "Butterflies"
  - "Bliss"
- Daniel Caesar - Never Enough
  - "Always"
- Kehlani - While We Wait
  - "Nights Like This"
- Kali Uchis - Orquídeas
  - "Pensamientos Intrusivos"
- Jessie Reyez - Paid in Memories
  - "Shut Up"
- Muni Long - Public Displays Of Affection
  - "Conversation"
- Selena Gomez – Rare, Revival
  - "Rare" Producer, Writer
  - "Ring" Producer, Writer
  - "Crowded Room" featuring 6lack - Producer, Writer
  - "Good for You" featuring ASAP Rocky - Producer, writer, musician
- Tate McRae
  - "Slower" - Producer, writer
- Alec Benjamin
  - "Let Me Down Slowly"
  - "Oh My God" - Producer, writer, musician
  - "The Way You Felt" - Producer, writer
- Bryce Vine - (Sire/WB)
  - "Drew Barrymore" - Producer, writer, musician
  - "La La Land" featuring YG - Producer, writer, musician
  - "Baby Girl" - Producer, writer, musician
- Chelsea Cutler
  - "Devil On My Shoulder" - Producer, writer
- DJ Khaled
  - "No Brainer" featuring Justin Bieber, Chance the Rapper and Quavo - Producer, writer, musician
- Shawn Mendes – Shawn Mendes (Island)
  - "Youth" featuring Khalid - Writer
- Nick Jonas – Nick Jonas (Island)
  - "Jealous" - Producer, writer, musician
  - "Area Code" - Writer
- Nick Jonas – Last Year Was Complicated (Island)
  - "Chainsaw" - Producer, writer, musician
  - "Bacon" featuring Ty Dolla Sign - Producer, writer, musician
  - "Unhinged" - Producer, writer, musician
  - "Don't Make Me Choose" - Producer, writer, musician
- LANY - Malibu Nights
  - "Thick and Thin" - Writer
- Dermot Kennedy - Without Fear
  - "Redemption" - Producer, Writer
- Carly Rae Jepsen
  - "Cut to the Feeling" - Producer, Writer
- Coin
  - "Nobodys Baby" - Writer
- Pitbull – Global Warming (Mr. 305 / RCA)
  - "Feel This Moment" (feat. Christina Aguilera) - Producer, writer, musician
  - "Hope We Meet Again" (feat. Chris Brown) - Producer, writer, musician
- Fifth Harmony – 7/27 (Epic)
  - "All in My Head (Flex)" Writer
  - "Squeeze" Co-Producer, writer, musician
- Demi Lovato (Island)
  - "Body Say" - Producer, writer, musician
  - "Ready for Ya" - Producer, writer, musician
- 5 Seconds of Summer - Youngblood
  - "If Walls Could Talk" - Producer, writer, musician
- Daya
  - "New" - Producer, writer, musician
- Rita Ora – Phoenix
  - "Anywhere" - Producer, writer, musician
- Tinashe - Joyride
  - "Flame" - Producer, writer
- Billy Raffoul
  - "Driver" - Producer, writer
- LANY - LANY
  - "Good Girls" - Producer
- Louis Tomlinson & Steve Aoki - Neon Future III
  - "Just Hold On" - Producer, Co-writer
- Justin Bieber – Believe (Island / Def Jam)
  - "All Around the World (feat. Ludacris) - Producer, writer, musician
  - "Believe" - Producer, writer, musician
  - "Make You Believe" - Producer, writer, musician
- Justin Bieber – Journals (Island / Def Jam)
  - "Backpack (feat. Lil Wayne) - Producer, musician
- Rita Ora
  - "Poison" - Producer, writer, musician
- Kelly Clarkson – Piece by Piece (RCA)
  - "War Paint" Writer
- Rachel Platten – Wildfire (Columbia)
  - "Speechless" - Producer, writer, musician
- Dan + Shay – Obsessed (Warner Brothers)
  - "Obsessed" - Writer
- Poppy – Bubblebath (Island)
  - "Lowlife" - Producer, writer, musician
- The Wanted – Word of Mouth (Island / Def Jam)
  - "We Own the Night" Producer, writer, musician
- Lea Michele – Louder (Columbia)
  - "Burn With You" Producer, writer, musician
- Justice Crew
  - "Que Sera" - Producer, writer, musician - Longest running hit in ARIA history.
- Fujii Kaze
  - "Hachikō" - Producer

Sir Nolan is published by Warner Chappell for the world, and managed by Olivia Geller, an independent manager based out of Los Angeles, CA.
