= Future Now Tour =

2016 concert tour by Demi Lovato and Nick Jonas

- Tour by Demi Lovato and Nick Jonas
- Associated albums: Confident; Last Year Was Complicated
- Start date: June 29, 2016
- End date: October 19, 2016
- Legs: 3
- No. of shows: 47
- Supporting acts: Rich Homie Quan; Migos; Marshmello; DJ JayR; Mike Posner; Chord Overstreet
- Attendance: 280,045
- Box office: US $17.4 million
- Website: futurenowtour.com
Demi Lovato tour chronology
Demi World Tour (2014–2015)	Future Now Tour (2016)	Tell Me You Love Me World Tour (2018)
Nick Jonas tour chronology
Nick Jonas: Live in Concert (2015)	Future Now Tour (2016)	A Night with Nick (2026)
Honda Civic Tour tour chronology
On the Road Again Tour (2015)	Future Now Tour (2016)	16th Annual Honda Civic Tour (2017)

The Future Now Tour was a co-headlining concert tour by American singers Demi Lovato and Nick Jonas. It was Lovato's fifth headlining tour, in support of her fifth studio album Confident (2015), and Jonas' third concert tour, in support of his third studio album Last Year Was Complicated (2016). The co-headlining tour started on June 29, 2016, in Atlanta and ended on September 17, 2016, in Inglewood. Lovato continued the tour as a solo headlining act on September 24, 2016, in New York City, and the tour concluded in Monterrey on October 19, 2016.

== Background and development ==
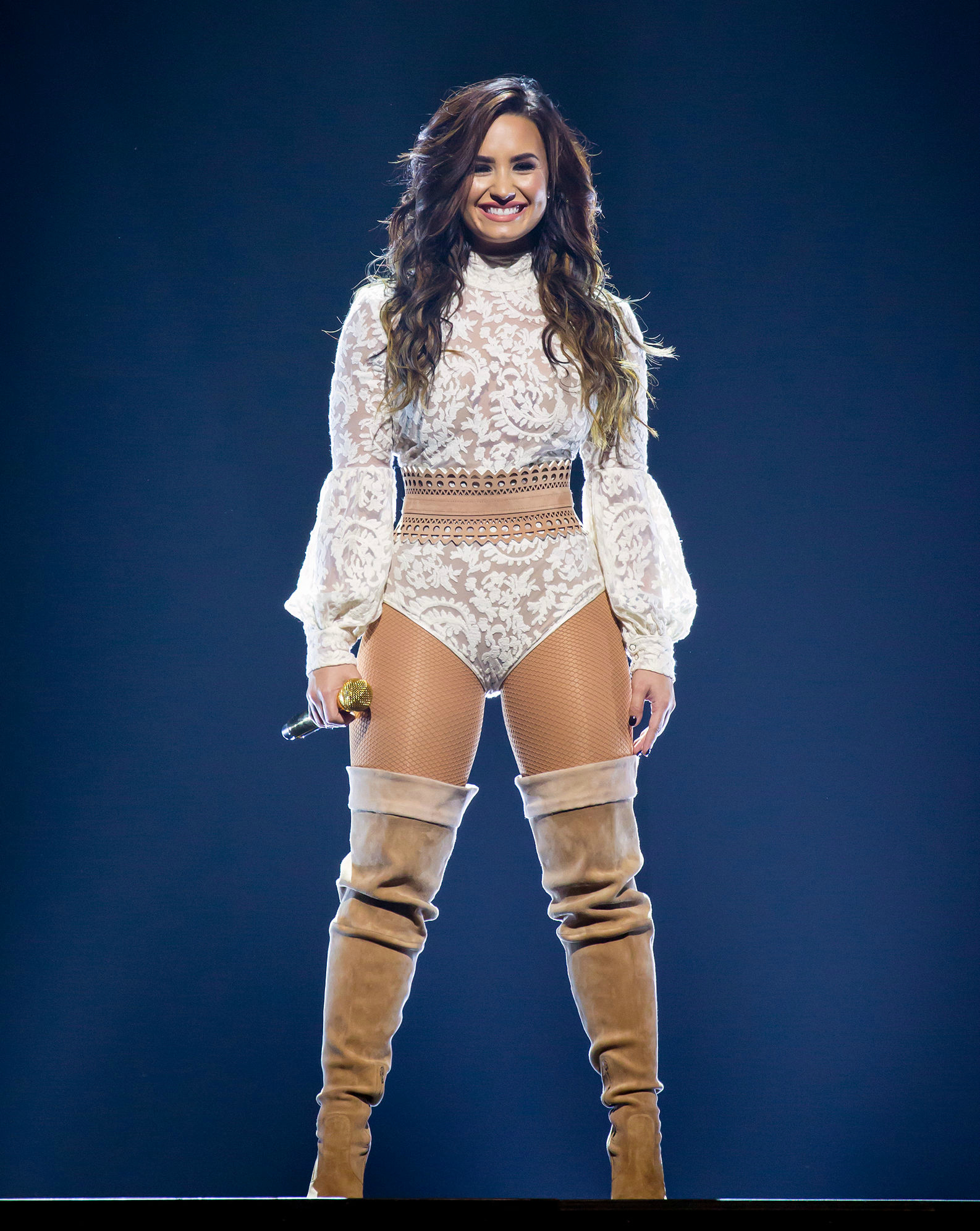
Lovato performing at the AT&T Center in San Antonio on September 10, 2016.

On October 26, 2015, Lovato and Jonas announced on the Elvis Duran Show after days of rumors that they would go on tour together. On the same day, she talked about the tour on Good Morning America. It was also announced that the tickets would go on sale on November 7, 2015. The poster for the tour was revealed as well and it has been described as very "Hunger Games tributes representing District 1.″

On March 22, 2016, the tour was officially announced as a part of the 15th Annual Honda Civic Tour. Fans were given the chance to enter the 2016 Honda Civic Tour Sweepstakes for a chance to win one of three grand prizes: a 2016 Honda Civic Sedan automobile customized by Lovato, a Honda Grom motorcycle customized by Jonas, and a trip for two to Los Angeles to see Lovato and Jonas live in concert at The Forum. On June 28, 2016, it was announced that Tidal would livestream the first date of the tour. On June 29, 2016, Lovato announced that CAST Centers would join her on tour to promote open dialogue about mental health and wellness, also to inspire fans and erase the stigma around asking for help.

The Honda Civic Tour of the Future Now Tour took place in North America across the United States and Canada from June 29, 2016 until September 17, 2016. Mike Posner served as the main opening act with the exceptions of Atlanta, Sunrise, Orlando, San Jose, Portland, and Seattle. Rich Homie Quan and Migos opened in Atlanta, Marshmello opened in Sunrise, DJ JayR opened in Orlando, and Chord Overstreet opened in Chula Vista, San Jose, Nashville, and Inglewood. Lovato and Jonas were scheduled to perform Charlotte and Raleigh, but cancelled over the HB2 law in North Carolina. Lovato and Jonas was also scheduled to perform in Virginia Beach, but cancelled due to a scheduling conflict with the Boston Pops Firework Spectacular July 4.

Lovato continued the Future Now Tour without Jonas in New York City, Turkey, and Mexico. On September 7, 2016, Global Citizen Festival 2016 announced Lovato as a headliner of the festival in New York City. Selena Gomez was an original headliner, but cancelled due to anxiety and depression caused by lupus. On September 21, 2016, Expo 2016 announced Lovato as a headliner of the festival in Antalya. The tour concluded in Mexico with three shows in Mexico City, Guadalajara, and Monterrey.

== Critical reception ==
Monique Melendez, reviewing the tour's Brooklyn stop for Billboard, praised Jonas and Lovato for putting their voices "front and center" in the show rather than focusing on showmanship as many pop concerts tend to do. Melendez noted that there was "no knife-sharp choreography, no flocks of strapping dancers, no impractical props cluttering the stage and only one wardrobe change for Lovato". She critiqued both headliners' sets for being "beleaguered by corny imagery" but complimented Jonas's setlist as a "quality selection of tracks" and Lovato for her vocals. Melendez picked out Lovato's performance of "Stone Cold" as a highlight, in which she sounded "better in the arena than she did on the studio version".

One area of the tour which Melendez criticized was the lack of collaborations between Jonas and Lovato. During their one duet in the show, Jonas's "Close" where Lovato took on Tove Lo's lines, Lovato "struggled at times to get her voice to match Lo’s softer, huskier tone". An additional collaboration, for Melendez, "could have turned this into a true Jonas and Lovato tour". The review concluded appealing to the tour's organizers to "please have Lovato and Jonas perform with each other, so they may bounce off each other’s energy rather than simply coexisting in the same arena".

Melendez also commended opener Mike Posner's set as "refreshing" and "raw", highlighting the "monologue on the tumultuous last few years of his life" he interpolated into his performance of "I Took a Pill in Ibiza". Melendez said that his "unusually serious closing moment" stood out in the tour's otherwise "glossy setting".

== Set list ==
Jonas and Lovato

This set list is representative of the Atlanta performance on June 29, 2016. It is not representative of all concerts for the duration of the tour.

1. "Levels"†
2. "Champagne Problems"†
3. "Teacher"†
4. "Good Thing"†
5. "The Difference"†
6. "Bacon"†
7. "Numb"†
8. "Chains"†
9. "Confident"‡
10. "Heart Attack"‡
11. "Neon Lights"‡
12. "For You"‡
13. "Body Say" ‡
14. "Fix a Heart"‡
15. "Nightingale"‡
16. "Warrior"‡
17. "Lionheart"‡
18. "Give Your Heart a Break"‡
19. "Stone Cold"
20. "Chainsaw"†
21. "Jealous"†
22. "Close"
23. "Skyscraper"‡

Encore

24. "Cool for the Summer"‡
Lovato only

This set list is representative of the Montreal performance on July 22, 2016. It is not representative of all concerts for the duration of the tour.

1. "Confident"
2. "Heart Attack"
3. "Neon Lights"
4. "Fire Starter"
5. "For You"
6. "Got Dynamite"
7. "Body Say"
8. "Wildfire"
9. "My Love Is like a Star"
10. "Fix a Heart"
11. "Nightingale"
12. "Warrior"
13. "Lionheart"
14. "Old Ways"
15. "Kingdom Come"
16. "Yes"
17. "Stone Cold"
18. "Give Your Heart a Break"
19. "Skyscraper"

Encore

20. "Cool for the Summer"
Notes

†Nick Jonas solo ‡Demi Lovato solo

- During the shows in Camden, Hershey and Auburn Hills, Jonas performed "Who I Am" in place of "Good Thing".
- During the shows in Toronto and Houston, Jonas performed "A Little Bit Longer" in place of "Chainsaw".
- During the shows in Washington, D.C. and Nashville, Brad Paisley joined Lovato and Jonas with guitar accompaniment for "Stone Cold".
- During the shows in Vancouver, Edmonton, Dallas, Inglewood and New York City, Lovato performed a cover of Aretha Franklin's "(You Make Me Feel Like) A Natural Woman".
- During the shows in Calgary and Winnipeg, Lovato performed "Wildfire".
- During the show in Cleveland, Lovato performed a cover of Adele's "When We Were Young".
Special guests

Lovato and Jonas performed duets with musical guests on some dates of the tour.

- June 29, 2016 – Atlanta, Georgia: "Dope", "Whatever You Like" and "Live Your Life" with T.I.
- July 2, 2016 – Orlando, Florida: "Rise Up" with Andra Day. This was performed as a tribute to the victims of the Orlando nightclub shooting, as well as Christina Grimmie.
- July 8, 2016 – Brooklyn, New York: "Panda" with Desiigner and "Georgia on My Mind" & "Blame It" with Jamie Foxx.
- July 12, 2016 – Newark, New Jersey: "All the Way Up" with Remy Ma and Fat Joe.
- July 26, 2016 – Washington, D.C.: "Without a Fight" with Brad Paisley and "Gotta Find You" / "This Is Me" Camp Rock medley & "Cake by the Ocean" with Joe Jonas of DNCE.
- August 13, 2016 – Las Vegas, Nevada: "Waitin for You" with Sirah.
- August 17, 2016 – Anaheim, California: "I’m Different" & "Watch Out" with 2 Chainz.
- August 21, 2016 – Seattle, Washington: "Yes Girl" with Bea Miller
- September 7, 2016 – Nashville, Tennessee: "Without a Fight" with Brad Paisley and "Die a Happy Man" with Thomas Rhett.
- September 17, 2016 – Inglewood, California: "Cake by the Ocean" with DNCE.
- October 16, 2016 – Mexico City, Mexico: "Girls Just Want to Have Fun" with Paulina Rubio.

== Shows ==
List of concerts, showing date, city, country, venue, opening act, tickets sold, number of available tickets and gross revenue (Note: All American dates, save the Saint Paul concert and second New York City show, were part of the 2016 Honda Civic Tour.) (Note: Headlined by only Lovato.)
Date	City	Country	Venue	Opening acts	Attendance	Revenue
June 29, 2016	Atlanta	United States	Philips Arena	Rich Homie Quan; Migos	7,112 / 7,372	$410,165
July 1, 2016 (Note: Originally planned to take place on June 24, but was rescheduled.)	Sunrise	United States	BB&T Center	Marshmello	7,251 / 10,314	$400,809
July 2, 2016 (Note: Originally planned to take place on June 25, but was rescheduled.)	Orlando	United States	Amway Center	DJ JayR	8,114 / 9,880	$489,752
July 6, 2016	Uncasville	United States	Mohegan Sun Arena	Mike Posner	6,492 / 6,492	$552,988
July 8, 2016	New York City	United States	Barclays Center	Mike Posner	11,456 / 12,556	$845,851
July 9, 2016	Portland	United States	Cross Insurance Arena	Mike Posner	7,643 / 7,643	$586,452
July 12, 2016	Newark	United States	Prudential Center	Mike Posner	10,756 / 11,555	$710,619
July 14, 2016	Camden	United States	BB&T Pavilion	Mike Posner	26,274 / 26,274	$2,174,655
July 16, 2016	Hershey	United States	Hersheypark Stadium	Mike Posner	11,756 / 19,611	$557,299
July 17, 2016	Buffalo	United States	First Niagara Center	Mike Posner	12,473 / 12,473	$783,644
July 20, 2016	Boston	United States	TD Garden	Mike Posner	10,357 / 11,290	$675,598
July 22, 2016	Montreal	Canada	Bell Centre	Mike Posner	6,124 / 7,226	$332,563
July 23, 2016	Toronto	Canada	Air Canada Centre	Mike Posner	—N/a	—N/a
July 26, 2016	Washington, D.C.	United States	Verizon Center	Mike Posner	—N/a	—N/a
July 27, 2016	Columbus	United States	Schottenstein Center	Mike Posner	7,203 / 12,761	$433,830
July 29, 2016	Louisville	United States	KFC Yum! Center	Mike Posner	17,499 / 17,499	$1,263,922
July 30, 2016	Auburn Hills	United States	The Palace of Auburn Hills	Mike Posner	8,468 / 10,433	$474,116
August 2, 2016	Rosemont	United States	Allstate Arena	Mike Posner	—N/a	—N/a
August 3, 2016	Indianapolis	United States	Bankers Life Fieldhouse	Mike Posner	—N/a	—N/a
August 5, 2016	St. Louis	United States	Scottrade Center	Mike Posner	—N/a	—N/a
August 6, 2016	Kansas City	United States	Sprint Center	Mike Posner	—N/a	—N/a
August 9, 2016	Denver	United States	Pepsi Center	Mike Posner	—N/a	—N/a
August 11, 2016	Salt Lake City	United States	Vivint Smart Home Arena	Mike Posner	—N/a	—N/a
August 13, 2016	Las Vegas	United States	MGM Grand Garden Arena	Mike Posner	6,823 / 7,112	$404,492
August 14, 2016	Chula Vista	United States	Sleep Train Amphitheatre	Mike Posner; Chord Overstreet	—N/a	—N/a
August 17, 2016	Anaheim	United States	Honda Center	Mike Posner	—N/a	—N/a
August 18, 2016	San Jose	United States	SAP Center	Chord Overstreet	—N/a	—N/a
August 20, 2016	Portland	United States	Moda Center	—N/a	—N/a	—N/a
August 21, 2016	Seattle	United States	KeyArena	—N/a	—N/a	—N/a
August 24, 2016	Vancouver	Canada	Rogers Arena	Mike Posner	—N/a	—N/a
August 26, 2016	Edmonton	Canada	Rexall Place	Mike Posner	—N/a	—N/a
August 27, 2016	Calgary	Canada	Scotiabank Saddledome	Mike Posner	—N/a	—N/a
August 29, 2016	Winnipeg	Canada	MTS Centre	Mike Posner	—N/a	—N/a
August 31, 2016 (Note: The concert on August 31, 2016 at the Minnesota State Fair Grandstand in St. Paul was part of the Minnesota State Fair.)	Saint Paul	United States	Minnesota State Fair Grandstand	Mike Posner	—N/a	—N/a
September 2, 2016	Cleveland	United States	Quicken Loans Arena	Mike Posner	—N/a	—N/a
September 7, 2016	Nashville	United States	Bridgestone Arena	Mike Posner; Chord Overstreet	—N/a	—N/a
September 9, 2016	Houston	United States	Toyota Center	Mike Posner	—N/a	—N/a
September 10, 2016	San Antonio	United States	AT&T Center	Mike Posner	—N/a	—N/a
September 12, 2016	Dallas	United States	American Airlines Center	Mike Posner	10,560 / 11,810	$449,186
September 14, 2016	Albuquerque	United States	Isleta Amphitheater	Mike Posner	23,866 / 23,866	$2,544,385
September 16, 2016	Phoenix	United States	Talking Stick Resort Arena	Mike Posner	6,986 / 11,448	$385,877
September 17, 2016	Inglewood	United States	The Forum	Mike Posner; Chord Overstreet	13,753 / 14,328	$1,024,941
September 24, 2016 (Note: The concert on September 24, 2016 in New York City, United States at Central Park was a part of the Global Citizen Festival with Demi Lovato as solo headliner.)	New York City	United States	Central Park	—N/a	57,433 / 57,433	$4,269,577
October 1, 2016 (Note: The concert on October 1, 2016 in Antalya, Turkey was a part of Expo 2016 with Demi Lovato as solo headliner.)	Antalya	Turkey	Expo 2016	—N/a	22,480 / 22,480	$2,244,731
October 16, 2016	Mexico City	Mexico	Palacio de los Deportes	—N/a	12,834 / 15,553	$334,498
October 18, 2016	Zapopan	Mexico	Auditorio Telmex	—N/a	3,146 / 7,055	$203,031
October 19, 2016	Monterrey	Mexico	Auditorio Banamex	—N/a	3,183 / 5,129	$227,069
Total					320,042 / 359,593 (89%)	$22,780,050

=== Cancelled shows ===
List of cancelled concerts, showing date, city, country, venue and reason for cancellation
Date	City	Country	Venue	Reason for Cancellation
June 30, 2016	Charlotte	United States	Time Warner Cable Arena	Protest of the Public Facilities Privacy & Security Act
July 2, 2016	Raleigh	United States	PNC Arena	Protest of the Public Facilities Privacy & Security Act
July 3, 2016	Virginia Beach	United States	Veterans United Home Loans Amphitheater	Scheduling conflict
