= Nick Jonas Live =

2014 concert tour by Nick Jonas

- Continental tour by Nick Jonas
- Location: North America
- Associated album: Nick Jonas
- Start date: September 22, 2014
- End date: November 6, 2014
- Legs: 1
- No. of shows: 18

Nick Jonas concert chronology
- Nick Jonas Live (2014); Nick Jonas: Live in Concert (2015)

Nick Jonas Live is the first concert tour for American pop singer, songwriter Nick Jonas without his band, the Administration or the Jonas Brothers, to support his second studio album, Nick Jonas (2014). The tour starts on September 22 in Seattle and ends on November 6 in New York.

== Background and development ==
On September 4, 2014, Jonas tweeted a message that said that he had a big announcement coming the next day. The next day he announced that he would go on tour. He also revealed the tour dates. On September 6, fans could pre- order his upcoming album to get early access to the tour ticket sale. They will also receive a download of his single "Jealous" on September 8, 2014.

The Tour was part of the promotional effort to Jonas' solo project. It came in a wave of new found freedom the artist was experiencing since departing from the band with his brothers.

Jonas also joined Demi Lovato on stage for select shows of the concert tour, performing three of her songs with her.

The promotion to the eponymous solo project also helped Jonas to better understand himself as an artist, stripping away from the influence and dynamic of being part of a band, while also allowing him to have a better schedule to venture through acting whilst promoting his music.

== Set list ==
This set list is representative of the performance on October 30, 2014. It is not representative of all concerts for the duration of the tour.

1. "Chains"
2. "Take Over"/ "Catch Me" (Demi Lovato cover)
3. "Numb"
4. "Crazy" (Gnarls Barkley cover)
5. "Warning"
6. "A Little Bit Longer"
7. "Push"/ "The Worst" (Jhene Aiko cover)
8. "Teacher"
9. "Santa Barbara"
10. "Wilderness" / "California Love" (Tupac cover)
11. "I Want You"
12. "Nothing Would Be Better"/ "Stay with Me" (Sam Smith cover)
13. "Jealous"

=== Notes ===
- On November 5, Tinashe joined Jonas on stage to perform the remix of "Jealous".

== Shows ==
List of concerts, showing date, city, country, and venue
Date	City	Country	Venue
North America
September 22, 2014	Seattle	United States	Showbox
September 24, 2014	San Francisco	United States	Great American Music Hall
September 25, 2014 (Note: This concert is a part of MixFest 2014.)	San Antonio	United States	Tobin Center for the Performing Arts
September 27, 2014	Mesa	United States	Virginia G. Piper Theater
September 29, 2014	Houston	United States	Fitzgerald's Upstairs
September 30, 2014	Dallas	United States	Trees
October 2, 2014	Chicago	United States	Bottom Lounge
October 3, 2014	Minneapolis	United States	Fine Line Music Cafe
October 5, 2014	Pontiac	United States	Crofoot Ballroom
October 6, 2014	Toronto	Canada	Lee's Palace
October 8, 2014	Boston	United States	The Wilbur Theatre
October 24, 2014	Mexico City	Mexico	El Plaza Condesa
October 25, 2014	Mexico City	Mexico	El Plaza Condesa
October 29, 2014	Los Angeles	United States	The Satellite
October 30, 2014	Los Angeles	United States	Troubadour
November 4, 2014	New York City	United States	Gramercy Theatre
November 5, 2014	New York City	United States	Music Hall of Williamsburg
November 6, 2014	New York City	United States	Rough Trade NYC
