= Chainsaw (Nick Jonas song) =

- Sluggo x Patrick Russel Remix cover

Promotional single by Nick Jonas

from the album Last Year Was Complicated
- Released: May 13, 2016
- Recorded: 2015
- Length: 3:19
- Label: Island; Safehouse
- Songwriters: Nick Jonas; Simon Wilcox; Sean Douglas; Julia Michaels; Nolan Lambroza
- Producer: Sir Nolan

"Chainsaw" is a song recorded by American singer Nick Jonas from his third studio album, Last Year Was Complicated. It was released on May 13, 2016, by Island, Safehouse and Republic Records as the album's second Promotional single. The song was written by Nick Jonas, Simon Wilcox, Sean Douglas, Julia Michaels and Nolan Lambroza.

== Background ==
On March 24, 2016, Jonas announced the song as part of the track list for his new album. He said that the song is one of his most vulnerable songs of the album and that it is inspired by his breakup with Olivia Culpo. He also said that "Chainsaw" is the most personal song he has ever written.

== Music video ==
A teaser of the music video was released online on May 9, 2016 In the video Victoria's Secret and Portuguese model Sara Sampaio makes an appearance. The video was released on May 13, 2016 and is directed by Luke Monaghan. In the clip the singer wanders around an empty home reminiscing about a former girlfriend and all the memories they shared together before burning it down.

== Live performance ==
During the taping of CMT Crossroads he performed the song and "Close" with Thomas Rhett and Danielle Bradbery. The song is part of the setlist of the Future Now Tour.

== Track listing ==
- Digital download – remixes
1. "Chainsaw" (Sluggo x Patrick Russel Remix) – 3:36

== Charts ==
| Chart (2016) | Peak position |
|---|---|
| Portugal (AFP) | 76 |
| US Pop Digital (Billboard) | 45 |

== Certifications ==
| Region | Certification | Certified units/sales |
|---|---|---|
| United States (RIAA) | Gold | 500,000^{‡} |
^{‡} Sales+streaming figures based on certification alone.

== Release history ==
| Region | Date | Format | Label | Ref. |
|---|---|---|---|---|
| Worldwide | May 13, 2016 | Digital download | Island; Safehouse | |
| United States | December 16, 2016 | Digital download (Sluggo x Patrick Russel Remix) | Island; Safehouse | |
