= Zaddy =

Single by Ty Dolla Sign

from the album Campaign
- Released: August 25, 2016
- Recorded: 2016
- Genre: Hip hop
- Length: 3:43
- Label: Atlantic
- Songwriters: Tyrone Griffin, Jr.; Adam Feeney; Jahaan Sweet; Jay Cummins
- Producers: Frank Dukes; Sweet; Ty Dolla Sign

Ty Dolla Sign singles chronology
"Bacon" (2016)	"Zaddy" (2016)	"Fade" (2016)

Music video
- "Zaddy" on YouTube

"Zaddy" is a song by American singer Ty Dolla Sign. It was released on August 25, 2016, as the third single from his ninth mixtape, Campaign (2016). The song was written by Tyrone Griffin, Jr., Jay Cummings, Adam Feeney, and Jahaan Sweet, with the production being helmed by the latter two.

== Background and release ==
In June 2016, Ty Dolla Sign announced his new mixtape, Campaign. On July 11, 2016, he released the title track lead single featuring Future. The second single, "No Justice" featuring Ty's brother Big TC, was released on July 21. On July 24, Ty shared the mixtape's track listing, which included "Zaddy" as the seventh track. He released "Zaddy" as the mixtape's third single on August 25, 2016.

== Critical reception ==
Pigeons & Planes named "Zaddy" as one of the best songs of September 2016. Complex placed it at number 37 on its The 50 Best Songs of 2016 list.

== Music video ==
The music video for "Zaddy" was filmed in Tokyo, Japan, and was inspired by 2015 science fiction psychological thriller Ex Machina. The video premiered via Ty Dolla Sign's YouTube channel on August 30, 2016.

== Charts ==
Chart (2016)	Peak position
US Bubbling Under R&B/Hip-Hop Singles (Billboard)	8

== Release history ==
Region	Date	Format	Label	Ref.
Worldwide	August 25, 2016	Digital download; streaming	Atlantic	

== In popular culture ==
Zaddy passed into slang culture as a term for a good-looking, fashionable man with "swag".
