= Good Thing (Sage the Gemini song) =

Single by Sage the Gemini featuring Nick Jonas
- Released: May 18, 2015
- Recorded: 2015
- Length: 3:46
- Label: Black Money; Republic
- Songwriters: Dominic Wynn Woods; Peter Svensson; Ilya Salmanzadeh; Savan Kotecha
- Producer: Ilya

Sage the Gemini singles chronology
"Guatanamera" (2015)	"Good Thing" (2015)	"Friday Night" (2015)

Nick Jonas singles chronology
"Jealous" (2014)	"Good Thing" (2015)	"Levels" (2015)

"Good Thing" is a song by the American rapper Sage the Gemini featuring Nick Jonas. It was released on May 18, 2015, by Republic Records as the intended lead single from the former's unreleased album Bachelor Party. The song peaked at number 75 on the Billboard Hot 100.

== Background ==
An early version of the song leaked online on April 4, 2015. Talking about the collaboration, Jonas said that it was a "great next step for his career", hoping for the song to become a successful summer hit. The song was eventually released in explicit and clean versions on May 18, 2015. The song appeared on the re-release of Nick Jonas' 2014 self-titled album, Nick Jonas X2.

== Music video ==
The music video for the song was shot in early May 2015 in Los Angeles. It premiered on Complex magazine's website on May 21, 2015, and was published on Sage's Vevo channel on YouTube the same day. Directed by Hannah Lux Davis, the video takes an exotic approach, in which Sage the Gemini and Jonas are seen featured in a lush, tropical backdrop, surrounded by models.

== Reception ==
Christina Lee of Idolator wrote that "the song proves that Sage the Gemini can write a smash hit if he wants". Rapup.com called the song "seductive", adding that the rappers rhymes are heartfelt. while Nick delivers a soulful hook. Brendan V van DJbooth said that "even though the rapper is the headliner of the collaboration, the song is mostly commanded by the Jonas brother, as you’ll hear a lot of his crooning over the roaring synthesizers". Vibe's Mia V. praised Nick's strong R&B vocals while the rapper switched it up with a silky smooth sixteen. MTV's Madeline Roth called the song "the perfect summer song with plenty of spellbinding rhymes and soulful refrain".

== Live performance ==
Sage the Gemini and Nick Jonas performed the song during the July 23 episode of The Tonight Show Starring Jimmy Fallon. Jonas performed the song live during his Live in Concert tour. He also performed the song during We Can Survive 2015. The song is part of the setlist of the Future Now Tour.

== Track listings ==
- Digital download
1. "Good Thing" (Clean version) – 3:46
- Digital download
1. "Good Thing" (Explicit version) – 3:46

== Charts ==
Chart (2015)	Peak position
US Billboard Hot 100	75
US Pop Airplay (Billboard)	32
US Rhythmic Airplay (Billboard)	10

== Release history ==
Region	Date	Format	Label
United States	May 18, 2015	Digital download	Republic
Germany	May 18, 2015	Digital download	Republic
United States	May 19, 2015	Rhythmic radio	Republic
The Netherlands	May 19, 2015	Digital download	Republic
New Zealand	May 19, 2015	Digital download	Republic
United Kingdom	September 4, 2015	Digital download	Republic
Ireland	September 4, 2015	Digital download	Republic
