= Jealous (Nick Jonas song) =

2014 single by Nick Jonas

Single by Nick Jonas

from the album Nick Jonas
- Written: 2013–2014
- Released: September 7, 2014
- Recorded: 2014
- Genre: Pop; R&B
- Length: 3:43
- Label: Island; Republic
- Songwriters: Nick Jonas; Nolan Lambroza; Simon Wilcox
- Producer: Sir Nolan

Nick Jonas singles chronology
"Chains" (2014)	"Jealous" (2014)	"Good Thing" (2015)

Music video
- "Jealous" on YouTube

"Jealous" is a song performed by American singer Nick Jonas for his eponymous sophomore studio album. It was released by Island Records on September 7, 2014 as the second single from the record. "Jealous" was written by Jonas, Sir Nolan, Simon Wilcox, and was later produced by Sir Nolan. "Jealous" peaked at No. 7 on the US Billboard Hot 100 becoming Jonas' highest-charting single to date. It is also his highest-selling single, with 3 million copies sold in the United States alone to date. "Jealous" also peaked at No. 1 on the US Hot Dance Club Songs chart, No. 2 on the US Billboard Mainstream Top 40 for five weeks, and No. 10 on the Billboard Canadian Hot 100. "Jealous" was also a top 20 hit in Australia, reaching No. 15 on the ARIA Charts, and a top 30 hit in Ireland, where it peaked at No. 28. It also peaked at No. 8 in New Zealand. "Jealous" had its biggest success in the United Kingdom, where it peaked at No. 2 on the UK Singles Chart.

The song's music video was shot by director Peter Tunney, a frequent collaborator of Jonas'. The video received positive reviews and was praised for inspirational quotes in the background. The singer performed "Jealous" on television shows such as Late Night with Seth Meyers, Today, The Kidd Kraddick Morning Show, VH1 Big Morning Buzz Live, VH1 Artist to Watch, the 2014 MTV Europe Music Awards' kick-off special and The Ellen DeGeneres Show and included it on the Nick Jonas Live Tour set list. The official remix of "Jealous" featured singer-songwriter Tinashe and was released on November 5, 2014. The song was also covered by The Voice season seven contestant Chris Jamison. The uncensored version was uploaded to his official YouTube account but is not present on the explicit version of the album. The song is also included as a bonus track on the UK deluxe version of Last Year Was Complicated, along with "Chains" and "Levels".

== Background and composition ==
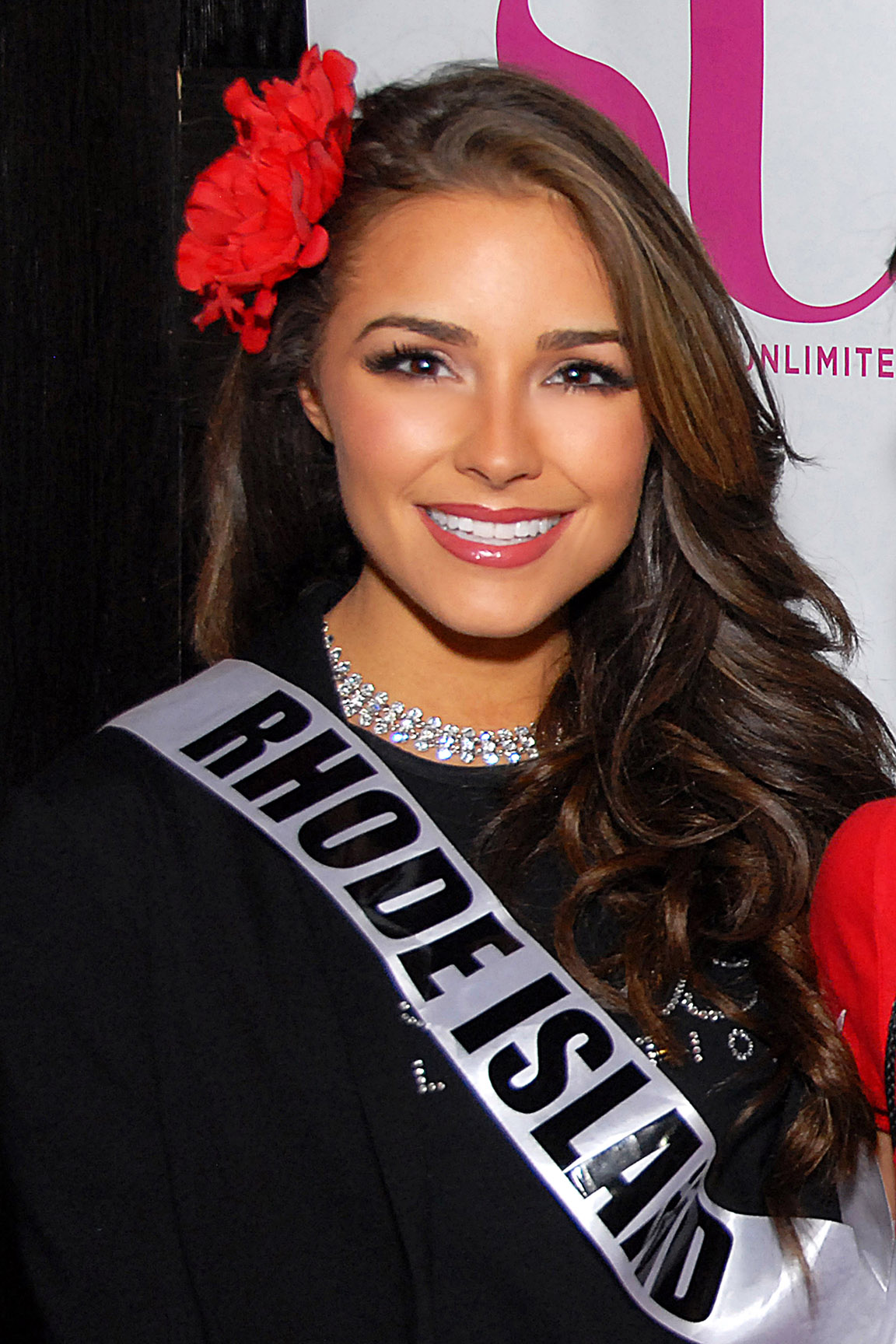
"Jealous" reportedly refers to Jonas' relationship with his then-girlfriend Olivia Culpo (pictured), who appears in the song's music video.

"Jealous"
A 22-second sample of "Jealous" by Nick Jonas, where a portion of the chorus is heard.

In an interview with E! News August 2014, Jonas confirmed that "Jealous" would be the second single of his upcoming album. He revealed the song was about the feeling of threat men experience when another man looks [at] or interacts with their girlfriend. In a later interview with Just Jared, Jonas explained:

"[It's] just that thing of puffing your chest up every once in a while...You feel like you're ready to go." Jonas believes his feelings were elated filming the TV series 'Kingdom', stating, "At the time I wrote and recorded it, I was in the middle of all the training for 'Kingdom,' so I was really sort of hyped up on testosterone."

"Jealous" is a pop and R&B song. Jonas told Billboard magazine that the song has a "Lionel Richie vibe."

Jonas played a 30-second preview of "Jealous" during an interview on the nationally syndicated radio program On Air with Ryan Seacrest on September 4, 2014. It was announced on September 6, 2014, that fans could pre-order his upcoming album to get early access to the tour ticket sale for Jonas' upcoming club tour. Fans who pre-ordered the album also received a digital download of "Jealous" upon its release on September 8, 2014.

The song is written in a key of D Major and Jonas' vocals span A3 to D5 (in scientific pitch notation)

== Music video ==
Talking about "Jealous"' music video, Jonas said: "The video is basically a trip into the mind of Nick Jonas by way of stream of consciousness. So the director, Peter, he said 'I think if you asked someone right now, 'Who is Nick Jonas?' I think you'd get a million different answers. After having the chance to get to know you, I feel like none of them would really be right because you are so different than the public perception. So let's get inside your mind because this song is very personal even though it's fun. It's kind of a dance song in a way. But let's dig a little deeper and see what it means to you.' So the video is really layered, like his art. You can see he layers a bunch of different news clippings and articles and says something greater over top of it. The video is the same way. The real message is that jealousy is something we all feel from all different walks of life, whether it's about romance or love or family or whatever it is — insecurities. It touches on all that and also has sort of a fun through line with me and Olivia is actually in the video as well."

On August 24, 2014, it was announced that the music video would be released on September 16 and is directed by Peter Tunney and Ryan Pallotta. Jonas' then-girlfriend, Olivia Culpo, makes a cameo in the video.

== Live performances ==
Jonas performed the song on Late Night with Seth Meyers. He also performed the song on Today, and an acoustic version of the song on the Elvis Duran & The Morning Show. He performed the single along with his previous single "Chains" and a cover of the Coldplay song "Magic" at The Kidd Kraddick Morning Show. On November 7, 2014, he performed the song live at VH1 Big Morning Buzz Live. He also performed the song live during the Nick Jonas Live tour. He performed an acoustic version of the song for VH1 Artist to Watch. Nick performed the song at the 2014 MTV European Music Awards Kick-off special.

On November 12, 2014, he performed the song on The Ellen DeGeneres Show. On November 5, Jonas performed the remix of the song live on television for the first time with Tinashe at 106 & Park, marking his first appearance on the show. That same day she joined him on stage at his concert in the Music Hall of Williamsburg. He performed the album version of the song live on the Dancing with the Stars Finale on November 25. During the performance he was accompanied by two ballroom dancers, Artem Chigvintsev and Lindsay Arnold. He also performed the song live at Dick Clark's New Year's Rockin' Eve with Ryan Seacrest 2015 alongside his new single Teacher. He also performed the song at the Lincoln Awards.

On January 25, 2015, he performed the song as part of a medley with his songs "Chains" and "Teacher" live during the evening gown competition at the Miss Universe 2014. He's set to perform "Jealous" and his single "Chains" during the 2015 Kids' Choice Awards. On April 13, 2015, he performed the song live in the United Kingdom as part of his album launch party. On April 18, he performed alongside country duo Dan + Shay the songs "Chains", "Jealous" as well their single "Nothin' Like You" during the 2015 Academy of Country Music Awards. He also performed the song at Wango Tango 2015. He performed the song at the 2015 Billboard Music Awards. On June 6, he performed it in the United Kingdom during the Capitalfm Summertime Ball 2015. On June 13, he performed the song at Pittsburgh Pride 2015 festival. During her second concert in New Jersey as part of The 1989 World Tour Taylor Swift invited Jonas on stage and they sang the song together. The song was part of the setlist of the Future Now Tour as well as the Happiness Begins Tour.

=== Cover versions ===
On November 17, 2014 The Voice season seven contestant Chris Jamison performed the song live during the top 12 performances. The cover of the song was released on iTunes that same day. On February 18, music group Postmodern Jukebox made a vintage Motown-inspired cover of the song. In Top 20 Live Playoffs, Lowell Oakley covered this song April 2015 on The Voice Season 8. Band Midnight Red made a mashup of Jealous with Ariana Grande's Love Me Harder. Harana member Michael Pangilinan performed this song while impersonating Nick Jonas, in the third week of the second season of the Philippine edition of Your Face Sounds Familiar. English singer Jessie Ware covered the song for BBC's Radio 1's Live Lounge 2015. In Instant Save Performance, Daniel Passino covered this song on The Voice season 10. In the blind auditions premiere, Dana Harper covered this song on The Voice season 11. Post-Hardcore band Dayseeker posted their cover on March 9, 2015, via InVogue Records's YouTube channel. Thief Club released a cover on the 2016 album Just Give Up.

== Tinashe remix ==
A remix of "Jealous" produced by Sir Nolan was released on November 5, 2014, by Jonas' record label Island Records. The remix received generally favorable reviews from music critics, who felt that it complimented the album version.

=== Background and composition ===
"Jealous" (Remix)
A 21-second sample of the remix of "Jealous" by Nick Jonas featuring Tinashe.

On November 4, Jonas held a Q&A online where he announced that Jealous would get an official remix featuring American singer Tinashe. He also released after the announcement a 42-second snippet of the remix and announced that it will be released on November 5. On November 5, the official remix featuring Tinashe was released online. Chris Brown has also released a remix. For the remix, the song had to undergo some minor changes, with the inclusion of some swear words. On November 14, the song was made available for download in Europe.

=== Reception and performance ===
Justin Davis of Complex wrote that Tinashe added her own female touch to the bouncy song, giving the other side of the story for Jonas' ode to being protective over his romantic conquests by sympathizing with her own admission of jealousy. The song remains just as catchy as the original, with Jonas' macho verses remaining intact, but the addition of Tinashe gives the song new life.

Radio.com columnist Courtney E. Smith wrote that the Hip-hop's up-and-coming it girl puts an extra sexy spin on the former Jonas Brother's angsty single, adding herself to the chorus and turning the music's Prince factor up to 10.

== Track listings ==
Digital download – single

1. "Jealous" – 3:43

Digital download – Remix

1. "Jealous (Ugo Remix)" – 3:58

Digital download – Remix

1. "Jealous" (Bent Collective Remix) – 7:02

Digital download – Remix

1. "Jealous" (The Rooftop Boys Remix) – 4:16

Digital download – single

1. "Jealous" (Remix) (featuring Tinashe) – 3:42

Digital download - Remix EP

1. "Jealous" (Remix) (featuring Tinashe) – 3:42
2. "Jealous" (B.o.B. Remix) (featuring B.o.B.) - 3:46
3. "Jealous" (Bent Collective Remix) – 7:02
4. "Jealous" (The Rooftop Boys Remix) – 4:16
5. "Jealous" (Ugo Remix) – 3:58

== Charts ==
=== Weekly charts ===
Chart (2014–2015)	Peak position
Australia (ARIA)	15
Brazil (Billboard Hot 100)	85
Canada Hot 100 (Billboard)	10
Czech Republic Airplay (ČNS IFPI)	41
Czech Republic Singles Digital (ČNS IFPI)	27
France (SNEP)	188
Ireland (IRMA)	28
New Zealand (Recorded Music NZ)	8
Norway (VG-lista)	32
Philippines Hot 100 (Billboard Philippines)	71
Scottish Singles Sales (Official Charts)	2
Slovakia Airplay (ČNS IFPI)	71
Slovakia Singles Digital (ČNS IFPI)	30
Sweden (Sverigetopplistan)	78
UK Singles (Official Charts)	2
US Billboard Hot 100	7
US Adult Contemporary (Billboard)	15
US Adult Pop Airplay (Billboard)	9
US Dance Club Songs (Billboard)	1
US Dance Airplay (Billboard)	3
US Pop Airplay (Billboard)	2
US Rhythmic Airplay (Billboard)	4

Chart (2024)	Peak position
Philippines (Philippines Hot 100)	71

=== Year-end charts ===
Chart (2015)	Position
Australia (ARIA)	92
Canada (Canadian Hot 100)	44
New Zealand (Recorded Music NZ)	36
UK Singles (Official Charts Company)	43
US Billboard Hot 100	38
US Adult Contemporary (Billboard)	38
US Adult Top 40 (Billboard)	42
US Dance Club Songs (Billboard)	17
US Dance/Mix Show Airplay (Billboard)	18
US Mainstream Top 40 (Billboard)	17
US Rhythmic (Billboard)	31

== Certifications ==
Region	Certification	Certified units/sales
Australia (ARIA)	Platinum	70,000^{‡}
Brazil (Pro-Música Brasil)	Platinum	60,000^{‡}
Canada (Music Canada)	Gold	40,000^{*}
Denmark (IFPI Danmark)	Gold	30,000^{^}
New Zealand (RMNZ)	3× Platinum	90,000^{‡}
Sweden (GLF)	Gold	20,000^{‡}
United Kingdom (BPI)	2× Platinum	1,200,000^{‡}
United States (RIAA)	3× Platinum	3,000,000^{‡}
^{*} Sales figures based on certification alone.^{^} Shipments figures based on certification alone.^{‡} Sales+streaming figures based on certification alone.

== Release history ==
Region	Date	Format	Label
Germany	September 5, 2014	Digital download	Island Records
United States	September 8, 2014	Digital download	Island Records
Canada	September 8, 2014	Digital download	Island Records
Spain	September 9, 2014	Digital download	Island Records
Australia	September 9, 2014	Digital download	Island Records
France	September 9, 2014	Digital download	Island Records
Italy	September 9, 2014	Digital download	Island Records
United States	September 9, 2014	Mainstream radio	Island Records
United States	October 28, 2014	Rhythmic radio	Island Records
United States	November 5, 2014	Digital download – Tinashe remix	Island Records
Canada	November 5, 2014	Digital download – Tinashe remix	Island Records
Netherlands	November 14, 2014	Digital download – Tinashe remix	Island Records
Italy	March 27, 2015	Radio airplay	Island Records
Ireland	April 3, 2015	Digital download	Island Records
Ireland	April 3, 2015	Digital download – Remix EP	Island Records
United Kingdom	April 5, 2015	Digital download	Island Records
United Kingdom	April 5, 2015	Digital download – Remix EP	Island Records

== See also ==
- List of number-one dance singles of 2015 (U.S.)
