= Chains (Nick Jonas song) =

Single by Nick Jonas

from the album Nick Jonas
- Released: July 30, 2014
- Recorded: 2014
- Genre: R&B
- Length: 3:23
- Label: Island
- Songwriters: Jason Evigan; Ammar Malik; Danny Parker
- Producer: Jason Evigan

Nick Jonas singles chronology
"Haven't Met You Yet" (2012)	"Chains" (2014)	"Jealous" (2014)

Music video
- "Chains" on YouTube

"Chains" is a song by American singer Nick Jonas, taken from his eponymous second album. It was released on July 30, 2014 by Island and Republic Records as the lead single from the album. The song was written and produced by Jason Evigan, with additional songwriting provided by Ammar Malik, and Danny Parker. It is an R&B song, using kick drum-driven beats, a splash of bass-dropping trap at the intro and bridge as the song's instrumentation. Lyrically, the song talks about feeling trapped in a binding and hopeless love.

Considered a departure from his music with the Jonas Brothers and Nick Jonas & the Administration, the song was praised by music critics for being an adult song, with his vocals and its production being praised. American singers Justin Timberlake and Miguel were influences for the song, as noted by some critics. The song's accompanying music video was directed by Ryan Pallotta and was released on July 30, 2014.

After the success of "Jealous" at radio stations in the US, Island and Republic re-released "Chains" as Jonas' next single. The song impacted mainstream radio stations on January 20, 2015. It impacted rhythmic radio on March 3, 2015 On February 28, 2015, a remix of the song surfaced online featuring the vocals of Jhené Aiko. The song has reached number 13 on the Billboard Hot 100, spending 20 weeks on the chart, later receiving a double platinum certification. The remix was released on March 2, 2015. The dance remixes of "Chains" reached number one on Billboard's Dance Club Songs chart in its May 23, 2015 issue.

== Background ==
In February 2013, Jonas Brothers announced they were returning to the music scene with a new single called "Pom Poms". The song received favorable reviews from music critics, but had very moderate success on the charts. Later, the band release the song "First Time" in June 2013, as the second single from their then-upcoming fifth studio album. A month later, they announced that the album would be called V. The band also announced a tour, but it was shortly cancelled and later the band announced their split in October, also cancelling the album.

Later, in early 2014, Nick Jonas announced he was going to release a solo record, stating: "I've got a lot of things in the pipeline right now and I'm waiting to release some news about my music and my next steps. It isn't quite locked in yet, but I have started making some music and now it's all about lining up the pieces." During an interview for Time, he commented about the album's musical direction, saying: "I came in really wanting to make a record that was different from anything I'd done in the past, but that was true to my influences: Stevie Wonder, Prince, Bee Gees. And then, more recently, The Weeknd and Frank Ocean. That whole vibe of alternative R&B and pop. It just fell into a really natural place really early." On July 24, 2014, Complex premiered "Chains", which was announced as the lead-single from his upcoming solo album. The song was eventually released to digital download on July 30, 2014.

== Composition ==
"Chains"
A 20 second sample of "Chains", where Nick Jonas sings about being chained in a love, over chunky R&B beats.

"Chains" was written by Jason Evigan, Ammar Malik and Danny Parker, with Evigan also served as the song's producer. It is a midtempo R&B song, being distinctly different from the Jonas Brothers' music, as well as Nick's music with the Administration, having "smooth" and "silky vocals and a decisive R&B aesthetic," which made one Billboard staffer compare the track to a Miguel song." Dylan Mial of Blogcritics added that the song is "a powerful and emotional combination of kick drum-driven beats, a splash of bass-dropping trap at the intro and bridge, with '80s rock ballad vibe that underlays the chorus."

Lyrically, "Chains" talks about being trapped in a hopeless love, with the singer declaring: "Tryna break the chains, but the chains only break me." In an interview with MTV, Jonas stated that, "The story behind 'Chains' is basically that feeling that all people can relate to, it's being trapped. For me specifically in this song, I connected to love and trust and for some people they have said it's broader for them, it's more than love, it can be about anything that entangles you in your life and doesn't let you do what you need to do to feel free," he said. "I think this is a good fit and I fell in love with the song and I really feel like it has become a staple for this album."

== Reception ==
The song received generally favorable reviews from music critics, who praised Jonas' new musical style and the song's production. Jason Lipshut of Billboard was positive, declaring that the singer was "desperately trying to position himself as an adult artist, and soundly succeeding." Mike Wass of Idolator compared Jonas to Justin Timberlake, writing that "it's a step in the right direction but no 'Like I Love You [Timberlake's debut single]." Emily Blake wrote for MTV News that "Chains" is "drenched in S&M and rather adult themes straight out of 'Fifty Shades of Grey'." Joey DeGroot of Music Times was ambivalent toward its lyrical content, calling it "the song's weakest point", but praised "the production and Jonas' vocal performance", claiming that they were "more than make up for it, [...] earn[ing] Jonas some artistic credibility after toiling in the Disney-pop world for most of his career." Dylan Mial of Blogcritics was complimentary with the song, calling it "by far the greatest, most inspired and powerful track of 2014 – it is pure musical perfection."

== Music video ==
On July 23, 2014, it was announced that a music video was being shot, being co-produced by Nick Jonas with director Ryan Pallotta. On July 25, 2014, the first 15 seconds of the music video were released online. Later, on July 28, 2014, two other 15 second snippets were released online with the full video premiering on July 30, 2014. The video features Jonas getting dragged across the floor of a church by a mystery woman, and tied up to a chair. On March 31, 2015, a second video of the song was released online. It was called Chains: The Wynwood Walls Edition. The video was filmed at Miami's Wynwood Walls graffiti installation.

== Live performances ==
"Chains" was performed live during the Nick Jonas Live tour. Nick Jonas also performed the song, along with "Jealous" and a cover of Coldplay' "Magic" at The Kidd Kraddick Morning Show. He also performed an acoustic version of the song for VH1 Artist to Watch. On January 25, 2015, Jonas performed the song as part of a medley with his songs "Jealous" and "Teacher" live during the evening gown competition at the Miss Universe 2014. On February 15, Jonas performed the song on The Tonight Show Starring Jimmy Fallon. On March 4, he performed the song live on The Ellen DeGeneres Show. He performed the "DJ Mike D and ChAdachi Remix" version of the song (along with "Jealous") during the 2015 Kids' Choice Awards, as well as at the 2nd iHeartRadio Music Awards. On April 14, 2015, he performed the song live on The Voice.

On April 18, he performed alongside country duo Dan + Shay the songs "Chains", "Jealous" as well their single "Nothin' Like You" during the 2015 Academy of Country Music Awards. On June 13, he performed the song at Pittsburgh Pride 2015 festival. The song is part of the setlist of the Future Now Tour.

=== Cover versions ===
Singer Sam Tsui recorded with singer Kina Grannis a cover of the song which was released on iTunes. On April 7, 2015, The Voice season eight contestant Nathan Hermida performed the song live during the live playoffs. Bea Miller made an a cappella version of the song in May 2015. American boy band Midnight Red released a cover of the song on their YouTube channel. In season 10 of The Voice, Malik Heard covered this song in the blind auditions.

== Jhené Aiko Remix ==
On February 28, 2015, a remix of the song surfaced online featuring the vocals of Jhené Aiko. The remix was released on March 2, 2015. He teams up with Jhené Aiko for the remix to "Chains". She sings the second verse on the track. Though the first verse and chorus remain the same for "Chains," the second verse swaps out Jonas for Aiko, includes new synthesizer effects.

=== Reception ===
Some critics have praised this remix, Carolyn Menyes from the site Music Times stated "Jhene Aiko sings with a sultry note in her voice, before going all Fifty Shades of Grey with her 'Chains.' Her verse may take a more literal approach to the "Chains" Jonas sings about, lyrically feeling like a rapper's take than an R&B songstress, but there's no denying that she fits in these "Chains" perfectly, balancing out Jonas' single and making it all her own along the way."

== Stormzy Remix ==
On May 20, 2015, rapper Stormzy unveiled the remix on BBC Radio 1Xtra. A day later, the song appeared on his SoundCloud page.

=== Reception ===
UK's Complex magazine's James Keith said that the song was another example of the mainstream accepting grime as it is—no compromises and no caveats. Tasha Demi of Verge magazine said that Stormzy bring a new element to the song.

== Track listings ==
Digital download – single

1. "Chains" – 3:23

Digital download – Deluxe single

1. "Chains" – 3:23
2. "Chains" (music video) – 3:35

Digital download – Remix

1. "Chains (Mike Hawkins Remix)" – 4:01

Digital download – Remix

1. "Chains (Dan Farber Remix)" – 3:28

Digital download – Remix

1. "Chains (Audien Remix)" – 4:30

Digital download – Remix

1. "Chains (DJ Mike D and ChAdachi Remix)" – 3:36

Digital download – single (Jhené Aiko Remix)

1. "Chains (Remix)" (featuring Jhené Aiko) – 3:22

Digital download – Remixes

1. "Chains (Stormzy Remix)" (featuring Stormzy) – 3:49
2. "Chains (Remix)" (featuring Jhené Aiko) – 3:22
3. "Chains (A$AP Ferg Remix)" (featuring A$AP Ferg) – 3:35

Digital download – Dance Remixes

1. "Chains (Audien Remix)" – 4:28
2. "Chains (DJ Mike D and ChAdachi Remix)" – 3:37
3. "Chains (Dan Farber Remix)" – 3:30
4. "Chains (Mike Hawkins Remix)" – 4:01

== Charts ==
=== Weekly charts ===
Chart (2015)	Peak position
Australia (ARIA)	83
Canada (Canadian Hot 100)	27
Canada CHR/Top 40 (Billboard)	20
Canada Hot AC (Billboard)	18
UK Singles (Official Charts)	79
US Billboard Hot 100	13
US Adult Pop Airplay (Billboard)	23
US Dance Airplay (Billboard)	6
US Dance Club Songs (Billboard)	1
US Pop Airplay (Billboard)	6
US Rhythmic Airplay (Billboard)	21

=== Year-end charts ===
Chart (2015)	Position
Canada (Canadian Hot 100)	100
US Billboard Hot 100	68
US Billboard Pop Songs	35
US Billboard Radio Songs	64
US Billboard Dance Club Songs	38
US Billboard Dance/Mix Show Airplay	33

== Certifications ==
Region	Certification	Certified units/sales
Brazil (Pro-Música Brasil)	Gold	30,000^{‡}
Canada (Music Canada)	Platinum	80,000^{*}
United States (RIAA)	2× Platinum	2,000,000^{‡}
^{*} Sales figures based on certification alone.^{‡} Sales+streaming figures based on certification alone.

== Release history ==
Region	Date	Format	Label
United States	July 30, 2014	Digital download	Island
Canada	July 30, 2014	Digital download	Island
Germany	August 4, 2014	Digital download	Island
France	August 4, 2014	Digital download	Island
Spain	August 4, 2014	Digital download	Island
The Netherlands	August 4, 2014	Digital download	Island
United Kingdom	January 19, 2015	Digital download	Island
United States	January 20, 2015	Mainstream radio	Island; Republic
United Kingdom	February 2, 2015	Digital download	Island
United States	March 2, 2015	Digital download – Jhené Aiko Remix	Island
United States	March 3, 2015	Rhythmic radio	Island
Ireland	July 10, 2015	Digital download	Island
Ireland	July 10, 2015	Digital download – Remixes	Island
United Kingdom	July 10, 2015	Digital download	Island
United Kingdom	July 10, 2015	Digital download – Jhené Aiko Remix	Island
United Kingdom	July 10, 2015	Digital download – Remixes	Island
United Kingdom	July 10, 2015	Digital download – Dance Remixes	Island

== See also ==
- List of number-one dance singles of 2015 (U.S.)
