= Champagne Problems (Nick Jonas song) =

Promotional single by Nick Jonas

from the album Last Year Was Complicated
- Released: April 8, 2016
- Recorded: 2015
- Genre: R&B; pop; electropop; funk
- Length: 3:12
- Label: Island; Safehouse
- Songwriters: Nick Jonas; Jason Evigan; Sean Douglas; Jonathan Tucker; PJ Bianco
- Producer: Jason Evigan

"Champagne Problems" is a song recorded by American singer Nick Jonas from his third studio album, Last Year Was Complicated. It was released on April 8, 2016, by Island, Safehouse and Republic Records as the album's first promotional single. The song was written by Nick Jonas, Jason Evigan, Sean Douglas, Jonathan Tucker, and PJ Bianco.

== Background ==
On March 24, 2016, Jonas announced the song as part of the track listing for his upcoming album.

On April 8, 2016, Nick Jonas released "Champagne Problems" as the album's first promotional single, following the release of a short teaser online the previous day. In an interview, he explained that the song "is about sharing a bottle of champagne with my now ex as we were breaking up to kind of close that chapter. It was sad and slightly sweet at the same time. It was a range of emotions and feelings and I think this song, although it sounds like a party song, actually has some of the deepest lyrics on the record".

== Critical reception ==
Caroline Menyes of Music Times said that the song was a little bit more of a dance-friendly track. Featuring Jonas' signature smooth falsetto and club-friendly beats, this song is begging to be played on Friday nights. Idolator's Carl Williott said that with its electro-disco-funk breakdown at the chorus and a surprising trap&B bridge, there are a lot of moving parts but they all work in service of a breathless party hook.

== Music video ==
The music video, directed by Colin Tilley was released on November 7, 2016. The video shows Jonas being surrounded by many women in a night club before he parts ways with his girlfriend.

== Live performance ==
Jonas performed the song live on Saturday Night Live on April 16, 2016. On June 10 he performed the song live on Today. The song is part of the setlist of the Future Now Tour.

== Charts ==
Chart (2016)	Peak position
US Pop Digital	35

== Release history ==
Region	Date	Format	Label	Ref.
Worldwide	April 8, 2016	Digital download	Island; Safehouse	
