= Close (Nick Jonas song) =

2016 single by Nick Jonas

Single by Nick Jonas featuring Tove Lo

from the album Last Year Was Complicated
- Released: March 25, 2016
- Recorded: 2015
- Length: 3:54
- Label: Island; Safehouse
- Songwriters: Robin Fredriksson; Mattias Larsson; Julia Michaels; Justin Tranter; Tove Nilsson
- Producer: Mattman & Robin

Nick Jonas singles chronology
"Levels" (2015)	"Close" (2016)	"Bacon" (2016)

Tove Lo singles chronology
"Desire" (2016)	"Close" (2016)	"Say It" (2016)

Music video
- "Close" on YouTube

"Close" is a song recorded by American singer Nick Jonas from his third studio album, Last Year Was Complicated. The track features guest vocals from Swedish singer-songwriter Tove Lo. It was released on March 25, 2016, by Island, Safehouse and Republic Records as the album's lead single. The song was written by Tove Lo, Julia Michaels, Justin Tranter, and its producers Mattias "Mattman" Larsson and Robin Fredriksson.

== Background ==
During a Twitter session, Jonas explained that the track is "about how I literally can't open up and be vulnerable with someone". The melody of the song was released over the days before the release of the song, through several tweets.

== Composition ==
The song is written in the key of A major with a tempo of 120 beats per minute.

== Critical reception ==
James Grebey of Spin magazine called "Close" a "sultry" track and deeply personal. Brittany Spanos of Rolling Stone called the song a sexy, steel-drum assisted single. Stephen Erlewine of AllMusic wrote a positive review saying "'Close,' a duet with Tove Lo, is perhaps the best showcase for this aspect of Nick Jonas, but the entirety of Last Year Was Complicated walks a fine line between immaculately produced pop confection and personal confession."

== Live performances ==
Jonas performed the song live with Tove Lo on Saturday Night Live on April 16, 2016. On April 24, 2016, he performed the song during his 75-minute set at the New Orleans Jazz Fest. He performed the song with Thomas Rhett and Danielle Bradbery for an episode of CMT Crossroads. On April 28, Jonas and Tove Lo performed the song on Jimmy Kimmel Live!. Jonas performed the song solo on The Ellen DeGeneres Show on May 9, 2016. He and Tove Lo performed "Close" live on May 22, 2016, at the 2016 Billboard Music Awards. On June 10, he performed the song live on Today. Jonas performed the song as a part of his setlist for the Future Now Tour with Demi Lovato singing Lo's lyrics. Jonas also performed the song live on German TV show Germany's Next Topmodel. During the San Antonio show on October 18, 2025 as part of Jonas20: Greetings from Your Hometown Tour, Jonas performed the song live with songwriter Julia Michaels singing Lo's lyrics.

== Music video ==
The music video was released the same day as the single and was directed by Tim Erem. The video depicts both singers unable to physically touch each other as they are continuously pulled away from the other. As their clothes are ripped away, the pair is able to finally get close. The more vulnerable the pair get, the closer they are able to get.

== Track listing ==
- Digital download remixes
1. "Close" (Louis Vivet Remix) – 3:28
2. "Close" (Dan E Radio Remix) – 3:44

== Credits and personnel ==
- Nick Jonas – lead vocals
- Tove Lo – songwriting, featured vocals
- Robin Fredriksson – writing, production
- Mattias Larsson – writing, production
- Julia Michaels – writing
- Justin Tranter – writing

== Charts ==
=== Weekly charts ===
Weekly chart performance
Chart (2016–2017)	Peak position
Australia (ARIA)	37
Austria (Ö3 Austria Top 40)	54
Belgium (Ultratop 50 Flanders)	33
Belgium (Ultratip Bubbling Under Wallonia)	7
Canada Hot 100 (Billboard)	12
Canada CHR/Top 40 (Billboard)	11
Canada Hot AC (Billboard)	14
Czech Republic Airplay (ČNS IFPI)	38
Czech Republic Singles Digital (ČNS IFPI)	26
Denmark (Tracklisten)	34
Finland Airplay (Radiosoittolista)	65
France (SNEP)	165
Germany (GfK)	61
Hungary (Stream Top 40)	23
Ireland (IRMA)	33
Italy (FIMI)	75
Latvia (Latvijas Top 40)	38
Netherlands (Global Top 40)	35
Netherlands (Single Top 100)	57
Netherlands (Tipparade)	2
New Zealand (Recorded Music NZ)	11
Portugal (AFP)	24
Scotland Singles (OCC)	21
Slovakia Airplay (ČNS IFPI)	53
Slovakia Singles Digital (ČNS IFPI)	20
South Africa (EMA)	7
Spain (Promusicae)	65
Sweden (Sverigetopplistan)	41
Switzerland (Schweizer Hitparade)	39
UK Singles (OCC)	25
US Billboard Hot 100	14
US Adult Pop Airplay (Billboard)	32
US Dance/Mix Show Airplay (Billboard)	22
US Dance Club Songs (Billboard)	4
US Pop Airplay (Billboard)	10
US Rhythmic Airplay (Billboard)	19

=== Year-end charts ===
Year-end chart performance
Chart (2016)	Position
Canada (Canadian Hot 100)	49
Netherlands (Global Top 40)	94
US Billboard Hot 100	66
US Mainstream Top 40 (Billboard)	34

== Certifications ==
Certifications and sales
Region	Certification	Certified units/sales
Belgium (BRMA)	Gold	10,000^{‡}
Brazil (Pro-Música Brasil)	2× Platinum	120,000^{‡}
Denmark (IFPI Danmark)	Platinum	90,000^{‡}
Italy (FIMI)	Gold	25,000^{‡}
New Zealand (RMNZ)	2× Platinum	60,000^{‡}
Portugal (AFP)	Gold	5,000^{‡}
Sweden (GLF)	Platinum	40,000^{‡}
United Kingdom (BPI)	Gold	400,000^{‡}
United States (RIAA)	3× Platinum	3,000,000^{‡}
^{‡} Sales+streaming figures based on certification alone.

== Release history ==
Release history and formats
Region	Date	Format	Version	Label	Ref.
United States	March 25, 2016	Digital download	Original	Island; Safehouse	
United Kingdom	April 7, 2016	Contemporary hit radio	Original	Island	
United Kingdom	April 29, 2016	Digital download	Louis Vivet Remix	Island; Safehouse	
