= Campaign (song) =

Single by Ty Dolla Sign featuring Future

from the album Campaign
- Released: July 11, 2016
- Genre: Hip hop; trap
- Length: 3:58
- Label: Atlantic
- Songwriters: Tyrone Griffin, Jr.; Nayvadius Wilburn
- Producer: D.R.U.G.$.

Ty Dolla Sign singles chronology
"Sucker for Pain" (2016)	"Campaign" (2016)	"Bacon" (2016)

Future singles chronology
"I Got the Keys" (2016)	"Campaign" (2016)	"X" (2016)

Music video
- "Campaign" on YouTube

"Campaign" is a song written and performed by American singer Ty Dolla $ign featuring American rapper Future. Produced by D.R.U.G.$, Ty's production team, it was released on July 11, 2016, as the lead single from his ninth mixtape of the same name (2016). The official remix of the song by Charlie Heat was also included on the mixtape.

== Music video ==
The song's music video, directed by Alex Bittan, was filmed in Los Angeles in September 2016. It premiered on November 7, 2016, via Ty Dolla Sign's official YouTube channel.

== Charts ==
Chart (2016)	Peak position
US Bubbling Under R&B/Hip-Hop Singles (Billboard)	3

== Release history ==
Region	Date	Format	Label	Ref.
Worldwide	July 11, 2016	Digital download; streaming	Atlantic	
