= Nick Jonas (album) =

Studio album by Nick Jonas
- Released: November 10, 2014
- Recorded: 2013–2014
- Genres: Pop; R&B
- Length: 38:52
- Label: Island
- Producers: Jason Evigan; Nick Jonas; Nick Monson; Sir Nolan; David Massey (executive producer)

Nick Jonas chronology
Songs from How to Succeed in Business Without Really Trying (2012)	Nick Jonas (2014)	Last Year Was Complicated (2016)

Alternative cover
- Nick Jonas X2 artwork

Singles from Nick Jonas
- 1. "Chains" Released: July 30, 2014; 2. "Jealous" Released: September 5, 2014

Singles from Nick Jonas X2
- 1. "Levels" Released: August 21, 2015

Nick Jonas is the second studio album by American singer-songwriter Nick Jonas. It was released on November 10, 2014, by Island Records. The album features guest appearances from Angel Haze, Demi Lovato and Mike Posner. The album received generally favorable reviews from music critics and reached the top 10 in the United States, the top 20 in the United Kingdom, Mexico and Canada, and also reached the top 40 in Australia and New Zealand. It was re-released on November 20, 2015, under the title Nick Jonas X2; including three new tracks and four remixes.

== Background and recording ==
In an interview with Rolling Stone, Jonas stated that when Demi Lovato's The Neon Lights Tour gets off the ground, he will turn his attention towards his upcoming solo project. "Some of it is done and ready to be released," he said. "I've got a lot of things in the pipeline right now and I'm waiting to release some news about my music and my next steps. It isn't quite locked in yet, but I have started making some music and now it's all about lining up the pieces.

"I came in really wanting to make a record that was different from anything I'd done in the past, but that was true to my influences: Stevie Wonder, Prince, Bee Gees," he told Time. "And then, more recently, The Weeknd and Frank Ocean. That whole vibe of alternative R&B and pop. It just fell into a really natural place really early. I came in really sure of what I wanted to do", Jonas said about his new record.

On July 30, 2014, it was announced that after Jonas' stint as a creative and musical director for The Neon Lights Tour, that there will be an duet between him and fellow Camp Rock star Demi Lovato on the record. "It's a great song that we both love. Her voice is just amazing on it. She's the real deal. It's the perfect fit for this record", Jonas said about the song. On September 5, 2014, it was announced along with the tour that his self-titled album would release on November 11, 2014.

Jonas opened up to Entertainment Weekly about the prospect of re-releasing the album with some additional tracks. He revealed, "I feel like the next step is just going to be getting a collection of a few more songs and maybe repackaging the album. [...] I still feel like there’s some life left on the record I released last year."

== Singles ==
"Chains" was released as the lead single from Nick Jonas on July 24, 2014. The song was written and produced by Jason Evigan, with additional songwriting provided by Ammar Malik, and Daniel Parker. The song peaked at number 31 on the US Pop Digital Songs chart. The music video (directed by Ryan Pallotta) was released on July 30, 2014. After the single's re-release in January 2015, it has since peaked at number 13 on the US Billboard Hot 100. The single was released on June 21, 2015 in the United Kingdom.

The album's second single, "Jealous" was released on September 7, 2014. It was written by Jonas, Simon Wilcox, and Nolan Lambroza; with production, which was helmed by Lambroza. On September 5, Jonas previewed 30 seconds of the new single. It was announced on September 6, 2014, that his fans could pre-ordered his upcoming album to get early access to the tour ticket sale. They will also receive a download of his single, "Jealous" on September 8, 2014. The song peaked at number 7 on the Billboard Hot 100, becoming Jonas' highest charting single in the United States as of August 2016. The music video (directed by Peter Tunney and featuring a cameo appearance by Jonas' real-life girlfriend Olivia Culpo) premiered on September 16, 2014. The single was released on April 5, 2015 in the United Kingdom and it peaked at number 2 on the UK Singles Chart.

With the re-release of the album, Jonas released a new single, "Levels", on August 21, 2015, to help with promoting. The music video to accompany with the song was released on August 30, 2015.

Within a few days later, the singer dropped "Area Code" on his SoundCloud account, with a music video being later released on October 9, 2015.

== Release and reception ==
Professional ratings
Aggregate scores
Source	Rating
Metacritic	69/100
Review scores
Source	Rating
AllMusic	3/5 stars
Alter the Press!	4.5/5
andPOP	8/10
Entertainment Weekly	B+
The Guardian	3/5 stars
Idolator	3.5/5
Newsday	B
PressPLAY	4/5 stars
Rolling Stone	3/5 stars
Slant	3.5/5 stars

Upon the album's announcement, Jonas promoted the album during various radio and television appearances, including a performance of "God Bless America" at the televised US Open Women's Finals on September 7, and both Watch What Happens: Live and Fashion Rocks on September 9, 2014. To promote the album Jonas released a track called "Numb" featuring Angel Haze as a countdown single from the album on October 7, 2014. The album's third track, called "Teacher", was released as the second countdown single on October 14, 2014. Also the album's fifth track, called "Wilderness", was released as the third countdown single on October 21, 2014. Jonas embarked on the album's supporting tour, the Nick Jonas Live Tour which kicked off in Seattle on September 22, 2014.

Nick Jonas earned generally favorable reviews from music critics upon release, holding an aggregate score of 69 out of 100 based on five reviews. Stephen Thomas Erlewine from AllMusic stated, "For all the guests and modern accouterments, Nick Jonas is at its best when Jonas plays it straight, when he relies on his eternal Prince and Stevie Wonder fixations, which give him not only a fairly rich palette to draw from but provide him with a good direction to channel his melodic skills".

== Commercial performance ==
The album debuted at number 6 on the US Billboard 200, with first week sales of 37,000 copies in the United States. It has sold 225,000 copies in the United States as of May 2016.

== Track listing ==
Nick Jonas – Standard edition
No.	Title	Writer(s)	Producer(s)	Length
1.	"Chains"	Jason Evigan; Ammar Malik; Daniel Parker	Evigan; Nick Jonas^{[a]}	3:23
2.	"Jealous"	Jonas; Simon Wilcox; Nolan Lambroza	Sir Nolan	3:43
3.	"Teacher"	Evigan; Malik; Parker	Evigan; Jonas^{[a]}	3:19
4.	"Warning"	Sebastian Kornelius Gautier Teigen; Bjørn Pedersen; Joseph Gil	Coucheron	3:16
5.	"Wilderness"	Ian Kirkpatrick; Sam Martin; Sean Douglas	Kirkpatrick	3:47
6.	"Numb" (featuring Angel Haze)	Jonas; Nick Monson; blackbear; Mike Posner; Raykeea Wilson	Monson	3:58
7.	"Take Over"	Jonas; Daniel Omelio; John Ryan	Robopop; Ryan	2:40
8.	"Push"	Jonas; Chase Foster; Daniella Mason; Christopher Young; Paul Shelton	Foster	3:32
9.	"I Want You"	Taio Cruz; Erik Hassle; Nick Ruth	Ruth; C. Taylor	3:23
10.	"Avalanche" (featuring Demi Lovato)	Jonas; T.J. Routon; Joseph Kirkland; Jason Dean; Michel Heyaca	Heyaca	3:17
11.	"Nothing Would Be Better"	Jonas; Kirkpatrick; Douglas	Kirkpatrick	4:34
Total length:				38:52

Nick Jonas – Deluxe edition (bonus tracks)
No.	Title	Writer(s)	Producer(s)	Length
12.	"Chains" (Just a Gent Remix)	Evigan; Malik; Parker	Evigan	3:53
13.	"Santa Barbara"	Jonas; Shelton	Jonas	3:40
14.	"Closer" (featuring Mike Posner)	Jonas; Posner; Monson	Monson	3:49
Total length:				50:14

Nick Jonas X2
No.	Title	Writer(s)	Producer(s)	Length
15.	"Levels"	Douglas; Talay Riley; Kirkpatrick; Marcus Lomax; Stefan Johnson; Jordan Johnson; Martin	Kirkpatrick; The Monsters and the Strangerz	2:47
16.	"Area Code"	Jonas; Kirkpatrick; Julia Michaels; Lambroza; Douglas; Wilcox		2:41
17.	"Chains (Remix)" (featuring Jhené Aiko)	Aiko; Evigan; Malik; Parker; Brian Warfield; Mac Robinson	Evigan; Jonas^{[a]}	3:23
18.	"Jealous (Remix)" (featuring Tinashe)	Jonas; Tinashe Kachingwe; Lambroza; Wilcox	Sir Nolan	3:41
19.	"Good Thing" (Sage the Gemini featuring Nick Jonas)	Dominic Wynn Woods; Ilya Salmanzadeh; Savan Kotecha; Peter Svensson	Ilya	3:47
20.	"Teacher" (Young Bombs Remix Radio Edit)	Evigan; Malik; Parker		3:35
21.	"Levels" (Alex Ghenea Radio Edit)	Douglas; Riley; Kirkpatrick; Lomax; S. Johnson; J. Johnson; Martin		3:14
Total length:				73:22

Notes

- ^{^[a]} signifies a vocal producer.

== Charts ==
=== Weekly charts ===
Chart (2014–15)	Peak position
Australian Albums (ARIA)	40
Belgian Albums (Ultratop Wallonia)	192
Canadian Albums (Billboard)	13
Irish Albums (IRMA)	57
New Zealand Albums (RMNZ)	35
UK Albums (Official Charts)	16
US Billboard 200	6

=== Year-end charts ===
Chart (2015)	Position
US Billboard 200	41

== Certifications ==
Certifications and sales for “Nick Jonas”
Region	Certification	Certified units/sales
New Zealand (RMNZ)	Gold	7,500^{‡}
^{‡} Sales+streaming figures based on certification alone.

== Release history ==
Country	Date	Version	Format	Label	Ref
Canada	November 10, 2014	Standard; deluxe	CD; digital download; Vinyl LP	Island	
United States	November 10, 2014	Standard; deluxe	CD; digital download; Vinyl LP	Island	
United Kingdom	July 17, 2015	Standard; deluxe	CD; digital download; Vinyl LP	Island	
