= Campaign (mixtape) =

Mixtape by Ty Dolla Sign
- Released: September 23, 2016
- Genres: R&B; hip hop
- Length: 56:47
- Label: Atlantic
- Producers: Allen Ritter; B Ham; Charlie Heat; CritaCal; D'Mile; D.R.U.G.S.; Darnell Got It; Dave Kuncio; DJ Mustard; DJ Spinz; Frank Dukes; HazeBanga; Hit-Boy; ISM; Jahaan Sweet; Mike Dean; Tish Hyman; Ty Dolla Sign

Ty Dolla Sign chronology
Free TC (2015)	Campaign (2016)	Beach House 3 (2017)

Singles from Campaign
- 1. "Campaign" Released: July 11, 2016; 2. "No Justice" Released: July 21, 2016; 3. "Zaddy" Released: August 25, 2016

Campaign is a commercial mixtape by American rapper and singer Ty Dolla Sign. It was released on September 23, 2016, by Atlantic Records. The mixtape was supported by three singles: the title track, "No Justice", and "Zaddy". The mixtape is a recurring theme expressing the views of Ty Dolla Sign and his friends and family on the presidential campaigns of Donald Trump and Hillary Clinton.

== Promotion ==
The title track was released as the lead single on July 11, 2016, featuring a guest appearance from American rapper Future. Fittingly, the music video premiered the night before election day (November 7, 2016).

"No Justice" was released as second single on July 21, 2016. The song features a guest appearance from fellow American singer Big TC (Ty's younger brother who is still incarcerated in prison).

"Zaddy" was released as the third single on August 25, 2016. The music video for the song premiered on August 30, 2016.

"3 Wayz" was released as the first promotional single on September 1, 2016. The song features a guest appearance from American rapper Travis Scott. "Stealing" was released as the second promotional single on September 9, 2016.

== Critical reception ==
Professional ratings
Aggregate scores
Source	Rating
Metacritic	71/100
Review scores
Source	Rating
AllMusic	3/5 stars
HotNewHipHop	75%
Pitchfork	6.9/10
Pretty Much Amazing	C−
Spectrum Culture	2/5 stars
XXL	4/5

Campaign was met with generally positive reviews. At Metacritic, which assigns a normalized rating out of 100 to reviews from professional publications, the album received an average score of 71, based on four reviews.

Winston Cook-Wilson of Pitchfork said, "Campaign outpaces his recent efforts like $ign Language and Airplane Mode but, still, mostly just preserve Ty's musical bottom line". Jordan Sargent of Spin said, "Campaign—a mixtape in name that feels not quite like a mixtape but not exactly like an album, either—is at its best when it carries on that tradition of richness of sound as a virtue in and of itself". Scott Glaysher of XXL said, "Campaign may not exceed the musical brilliance of Free TC but it's a close runner-up". Mick Jacobs of Pretty Much Amazing said, "As a mixtape, I understand why Campaign sounds so derivative, but still I wish Griffin had pushed a bit further in terms of musical experimentation".

== Commercial performance ==
Campaign debuted at number 28 on the US Billboard 200, with 14,000 album-equivalent units.

== Track listing ==
Campaign track listing
No.	Title	Writer(s)	Producer(s)	Length
1.	"$Intro"	Tyrone Griffin, Jr.; Nathaniel Howard; Christopher Malachi; Dernst Emile II	D'Mile	1:26
2.	"$"	Griffin, Jr.; Nathan Welch; Jahaan Sweet	D'Mile; Sweet	3:13
3.	"Campaign" (featuring Future)	Griffin, Jr.; Nayvadius Wilburn	D.R.U.G.S.	3:57
4.	"??? (Where)" (featuring Migos)	Griffin, Jr.; Kirshnik Ball; Quavious Marshall; Gary Hill	DJ Spinz	4:26
5.	"3 Wayz" (featuring Travis Scott)	Griffin, Jr.; Jacques Webster; Chauncey Hollis, Jr.	Hit-Boy; Mike Dean; HazeBanga	3:41
6.	"Juice"	Griffin, Jr.; Theron Thomas; Timothy Thomas; Titus Stubblefield; Brandon Hamlin	B Ham	3:36
7.	"Zaddy"	Griffin, Jr.; Jay Cummins; Tommy Paxton-Beesley; Welch; Adam Feeney; Sweet	Frank Dukes; Sweet; Ty Dolla Sign	3:43
8.	"Hello"	Griffin, Jr.; Erika Hamilton; Allen Ritter	Ritter	3:46
9.	"R&B"	Griffin, Jr.; Craig Brockman; Glenda Proby; Xavier Dotson; Melissa Elliott; Timothy Mosley	Zaytoven	2:49
10.	"Stealing"	Griffin, Jr.; Dave Kuncio; Latisha Hyman	Ty Dolla Sign; Kuncio; Tish Hyman	2:42
11.	"Clean"	Griffin, Jr.; Jason Boyd	Ty Dolla Sign; Ali P	3:30
12.	"My Song" (featuring 24hrs)	Griffin, Jr.; Robert Davis	ISM; D'Mile; Ty Dolla Sign	4:11
13.	"Pu$$y" (featuring Trey Songz and Wiz Khalifa)	Griffin, Jr.; Tremaine Neverson; Cameron Thomaz; Maurice Simmonds; Dijon MacFarlane; Ritter	DJ Mustard; Ritter	3:03
14.	"No Justice" (featuring Big TC)	Griffin, Jr.; Gabriel Griffin; Emile II	D'Mile	3:54
15.	"Watching" (featuring Meek Mill)	Griffin, Jr.; Robert Williams; Ernest Brown; Calvin Price; Darnell Donohue	Charlie Heat; CritaCal; Darnell Got It	3:15
16.	"Campaign (Charlie Heat Remix)" (featuring Future)	Griffin, Jr.; Wilburn; Brown	D.R.U.G.S.; Charlie Heat	4:00
Total length:				56:47

== Charts ==
Chart performance for Campaign
Chart (2016)	Peak position
Australian Albums (ARIA)	100
Belgian Albums (Ultratop Flanders)	144
Canadian Albums (Billboard)	45
French Albums (SNEP)	28
New Zealand Heatseekers Albums (RMNZ)	8
US Billboard 200	28
US Top R&B/Hip-Hop Albums (Billboard)	7
