= Teacher (Nick Jonas song) =

Promotional single by Nick Jonas

from the album Nick Jonas
- Released: October 14, 2014
- Recorded: 2014
- Length: 3:19
- Label: Island
- Songwriters: Jason Evigan; Ammar Malik; Danny Parker
- Producer: Jason Evigan

"Teacher" is a song performed by American recording artist Nick Jonas for his eponymous second studio album. It was written by Ammar Malik, Danny Parker, and Jason Evigan, and produced by the latter. It was released as the second promotional single on October 14, 2014. The song is featured in the 2015 dance video game Just Dance 2016.

== Background and composition ==
"Teacher" was written by Ammar Malik, Danny Parker and Jason Evigan, and produced by the latter. The song is an 80's disco-inspired tune. “This game we're playing make me wanna break the rules”, sings Nick in the second verse. "Teacher" is a song where Nick teaches a girl he's really interested in how to properly “love”.

On October 14, 2014, "Teacher", alongside the song "Wilderness", were leaked online. That same day they were made available in Australia on iTunes. One day before the album's release, Jonas released a lyric video of the song. The video shows him and other people with the lyrics of the song on their bodies.

== Reception ==
MTV News' John Walker noted that "Taylor Swift's not the only pop star going retro with their new sound. Jonas' new song, “Teacher,” sees the singer going all Gary Numan after dark, infusing a standard bedroom jam with a certain New Wave flare".

Tehrene Firman of Teen Vogue called the song "today's new '80s-inspired".

Bradley Stern of Idolator wrote that "'Right when I think I finally got you figured out, you turn around and blow my mind,' the crooner starts above the song's kicky pulse, giving just a little of that Prince funkiness in the process. Things get even sexier as he heads into the chorus. Sounds like a real smash to us".

== Live performances ==
Jonas has performed the song as part of his Nick Jonas Live tour. He reprised the song live at Dick Clark's New Year's Rockin' Eve with Ryan Seacrest in 2015. Jonas is set to perform the song, on January 25, 2015, as part of a medley with his singles, "Jealous" and "Chains" during the evening gown competition at the Miss Universe 2014. On June 13, 2015, he performed the song at Pittsburgh Pride 2015 festival. Teacher is a part of the setlist of the Nick Jonas Live in Concert tour. The song is often part of a medley. On September 19 during the iHeartRadio Music Festival Nick performed several songs including "Teacher" during the day and evening . During We Can Survive 2015 he performed several songs during the evening including a mash-up of Teacher and a cover of Bell Biv DeVoe's Poison. The song is part of the setlist of the Future Now Tour.

== Remixes ==
On July 8, 2015, Nick Jonas announced the official Remix of his song Teacher; the song is remix by DJ and producer Dave Aude. In an interview with The Advocate Nick said that he was lucky to work with the Producer. At the same day of the announcement the remix appeared on SoundCloud. Mike Wass of Idolator said that the Dave Aude Remix is a fun track with a weird (in a good way) Harold Faltermeyer vibe.

Canadian production duo Young Bombs created a remix of the song and released in online on July 6, 2015. The remix appeared on the re-release of the 2014 Nick Jonas self-titled album, now renamed Nick Jonas X2. According to Jason Lipshutz of Billboard he duo transformed Jonas' slick swagger into an epic dance exaltation, with breathless pants and programmed strings contributing to the remix's urgency.

== Track listings ==
Digital download – album version

1. "Teacher" – 3:19

Young Bombs remix

1. "Teacher (Young Bombs remix radio edit)" – 3:37

Bassanova remix

1. "Teacher (Bassanova remix radio edit)" – 3:30

Dave Audé remix

1. "Teacher (Dave Audé remix radio edit)" – 3:31

== Charts ==
Chart (2015)	Peak position
US Dance Club Songs (Billboard)	13

== Release history ==
Region	Date	Format	Label
Australia	October 14, 2014	Digital download	Island Records
United States	November 4, 2014	Digital download	Island Records
United States	July 24, 2015	Bassanova remix radio edit	Island Records
United States	July 24, 2015	Young Bombs remix radio edit	Island Records
United States	July 24, 2015	Dave Audé remix radio edit	Island Records
Australia	July 31, 2015	Bassanova remix radio edit	Island Records
Australia	July 31, 2015	Young Bombs remix radio edit	Island Records
Australia	July 31, 2015	Dave Audé remix radio edit	Island Records
New Zealand	July 31, 2015	Bassanova remix radio edit	Island Records
New Zealand	July 31, 2015	Young Bombs remix radio edit	Island Records
New Zealand	July 31, 2015	Dave Audé remix radio edit	Island Records
Netherlands	July 31, 2015	Bassanova remix radio edit	Island Records
Netherlands	July 31, 2015	Young Bombs remix radio edit	Island Records
Netherlands	July 31, 2015	Dave Audé remix radio edit	Island Records
