= Levels (Nick Jonas song) =

Single by Nick Jonas

from the album Nick Jonas X2
- Released: August 21, 2015
- Recorded: 2015
- Genre: Electropop; funk
- Length: 2:47
- Label: Island; Safehouse
- Songwriters: Sean Douglas; Stefan Johnson; Marcus Lomax; Ian Kirkpatrick; Sam Martin; Talay Riley; Jordan Johnson
- Producers: Ian Kirkpatrick; The Monsters and the Strangerz

Nick Jonas singles chronology
"Good Thing" (2015)	"Levels" (2015)	"Close" (2016)

"Levels" is a song by American singer Nick Jonas. It was released on August 21, 2015, by Island, Safehouse and Republic Records. The song was written and produced by Ian Kirkpatrick and The Monsters and the Strangerz, with additional songwriting provided by Sam Martin, Sean Douglas, Talay Riley and Like Mike. The song's accompanying music video was directed by Colin Tilley and was released on August 30, 2015. The song is the first and only single from Nick Jonas X2, the reissue of Nick Jonas. The song was listed by SPIN Magazine as the 11th best song of 2015. The dance remixes of "Levels" reached number one on Billboard's Dance Club Songs chart in its December 12, 2015 issue.

== Background ==
On August 13, 2015, it was revealed that his new single would be called "Levels" and would be released on August 21, 2015. The announcement was made with a 15-second video preview showing him waking up and getting ready for the day in a James Bond fashion. On August 14, Nick said in an interview for MTV, “I’ve been hard at work on the new music trying to push myself lyrically to say some deeper things,” he said. “And I’ve gone through a lot in this past year and a half and I want to talk about it and just push myself as an artist and continue to grow.” On August 15, Jonas revealed part of the song's lyrics on his personal Twitter account. He tweeted "I know we can get higher... There's levels to your love. Yeah there's levels to your love." On August 17, 2015, Nick released the cover of the song.

== Reception ==
Spin listed "Levels" as the 11th best song of 2015. '“Levels” clocks in at under three minutes, but were Nick Jonas expands it to three hours of immaculately stacked madness, we'd still play it on a loop. “Levels” offered a beat flexible and exuberant enough to challenge him to rise to the upper-floor'. Billboard praised the song, calling it 'really, really good'. MTV's Emilee Lindner wrote about the song: "Levels' fuses funk with a club beat, layering the former Jonas Brother’s vocals with his spiraling falsetto ad-libs. It’s a quick, under-three-minute tune, but it’s enough to inject you with a little party if you need it."

== Music video ==
On August 19, 2015, Jonas released a behind-the-scenes picture on his Instagram account of the video shoot. The music video was released on August 30, 2015. On August 25, three snippets of the music video were released online showing that the video takes place in an industrial warehouse with Nick surrounded by dancers, cars and cameras. On August 29, the behind the scenes video was released online where it was revealed that the video was directed by Colin Tilley. The video depicts Jonas and multiple women dancing in an abandoned warehouse. In a couple scenes, Nick is shown going up an elevator, in reference towards a lyric in the beginning of the song.

== Live performance ==
On August 28, Jonas performed the song live on stage during a concert for Time Warner Cable and national HIV/AIDS organization Lifebeat. Jonas also performed the song live on television for the first time at the 2015 MTV Video Music Awards red carpet pre-show. Levels is a part of the setlist of the Nick Jonas Live in Concert tour. On September 8 he performed the song on Late Night with Seth Meyers. On September 19 during the iHeartRadio Music Festival Nick performed several songs including "Levels" during the day and evening . He performed the song during We Day Toronto on October 1. On October 20, he performed the song at Tidal X 1020. Two days later on October 22, 2015, Nick performed Levels on The Ellen DeGeneres Show. On October 24, he performed Levels among other songs at We Can Survive 2015 and at the 2015 Maxim Halloween Party. On November 8, Jonas performed the song live on BBC 1 Teen Awards. The song is part of the setlist of the Future Now Tour.

=== Cover version ===
Canadian singer Alessia Cara performed a soulful acoustic cover of the song live on Sirius XM on Tuesday October 13, 2015. Fleur East covered the song for BBC Radio 1's Live Lounge.

== Track listing ==
- Digital download
1. "Levels" – 2:47
- Digital download – Jump Smokers Remix
1. "Levels" (Jump Smokers Radio Edit Remix) – 3:35
2. "Levels" (Jump Smokers Extended Remix) – 4:05
- Digital download – Alex Ghenea Remix
1. "Levels" (Alex Ghenea Radio Edit) – 3:14
2. "Levels" (Alex Ghenea Extended) – 4:24
- Digital download – Steven Redant Remix
1. "Levels" (Steven Redant Club Mix) – 5:07
2. "Levels" (Steven Redant Dub Mix) – 4:44

Digital download – EP

1. "Levels" (Alex Ghenea Radio Edit) – 3:14
2. "Levels" (Jump Smokers Radio Edit Remix) – 3:35
3. "Levels" (Steven Redant Club Mix) – 5:07
4. "Levels" (Alex Ghenea Extended) – 4:24
5. "Levels" (Jump Smokers Extended Remix) – 4:05
6. "Levels" (Steven Redant Dub Mix) – 4:44

== Charts ==
Chart (2015–2016)	Peak position
Australia (ARIA)	79
Belgium (Ultratip 50 Wallonia)	25
Canada Hot 100 (Billboard)	23
Canada CHR/Top 40 (Billboard)	15
Canada Hot AC (Billboard)	50
New Zealand (Recorded Music NZ)	16
Scotland (Official Charts Company)	23
South Africa Airplay (EMA)	6
Sweden Heatseeker (Sverigetopplistan)	18
UK Singles (Official Charts)	46
US Billboard Hot 100	44
US Dance Airplay (Billboard)	19
US Dance Club Songs (Billboard)	1
US Pop Airplay (Billboard)	14
US Rhythmic Airplay (Billboard)	30

== Certifications ==
Region	Certification	Certified units/sales
Canada (Music Canada)	Gold	40,000^{*}
New Zealand (RMNZ)	Platinum	15,000^{*}
United States (RIAA)	Gold	500,000^{‡}
^{*} Sales figures based on certification alone.^{‡} Sales+streaming figures based on certification alone.

== Release history ==
List of release dates, showing region, formats, label and reference
Region	Date	Format(s)	Label	Ref.
Worldwide	August 21, 2015	Digital download	Island	
United States	August 25, 2015	Contemporary hit radio	Island; Republic	

== See also ==
- List of number-one dance singles of 2015 (U.S.)
