= How to Succeed in Business Without Really Trying: Soundtrack from the Musical Comedy =

2011 cast recording

Cast recording by 2011 Broadway revival cast of How to Succeed in Business Without Really Trying
- Released: May 31, 2011 (digital); June 7, 2011 (physical)
- Recorded: April 10–12, 2011
- Studio: Manhattan Center, New York City
- Genre: Show tune; musical comedy
- Length: 1:13:08
- Label: Decca Broadway
- Producer: Robert Sher

How to Succeed in Business Without Really Trying: Soundtrack from the Musical Comedy is the cast album for the 50th anniversary Broadway revival of the 1961 musical How to Succeed in Business Without Really Trying, which had music and lyrics by Frank Loesser and book by Abe Burrows, Jack Weinstock, and Willie Gilbert, based on Shepherd Mead's 1952 book of the same name. Released digitally on May 31, 2011, and in physical formats on June 7 by Decca Broadway, the album featured performances of the musical numbers by the cast, headlined by Daniel Radcliffe and John Larroquette. It was nominated for Best Musical Theater Album at the 54th Annual Grammy Awards.

== Background ==
The original orchestration of the 1961 musical had nearly 27 players, whereas the 2011 revival had 14 players. Rob Ashford, director and stage choreographer had retained more of the reed and brass written at the expense of the strings, being diminished with the augmentation of synth, thus allowing the present-day creative staff to have the show arranged and orchestrated to their own style. Doug Besterman reorchestrated the musical to give it a brand new sound. At the liner notes, the producers felt they decided "to think in terms of a muscular jazz ensemble rather than a symphonic sound". The team found inspiration in the work of 1950s arranger Marty Paich and blendedStereolab's 1993 extended play, Space Age Bachelor Pad Music along with Henry Mancini and Martin Denny's 1957 album Exotica.

== Reception ==
Jon O'Brien of AllMusic wrote "How to Succeed... loses much of its context when stripped of its visual spectacle, but diffusing any reservations about the Harry Potter star's musical ability, this soundtrack is still a charming listen for the army of worldwide theatergoers who haven't had the chance to make up their own minds themselves." Steven Suskin of Playbill wrote "The cast album is different, though; you can very easily compare today's recording with that of yesteryear".

== Track listing ==
No.	Title	Artist(s)	Length
1.	"Overture"	How To Succeed Orchestra	2:26
2.	"Dear Reader..."	Anderson Cooper and Daniel Radcliffe	0:39
3.	"How To Succeed"	Daniel Radcliffe and How To Succeed Company	2:34
4.	"Happy To Keep His Dinner Warm"	Mary Faber and Rose Hemingway	2:43
5.	"Coffee Break"	Christopher Hanke, Mary Faber and Office Workers	3:30
6.	"The Company Way"	Daniel Radcliffe and Rob Bartlett	2:52
7.	"The Company Way (Reprise)"	Christopher Hanke, Rob Bartlett and Office Workers	1:39
8.	"Rosemary's Philosophy"	Rose Hemingway, Daniel Radcliffe and Anderson Cooper	0:37
9.	"Entrance Of Hedy La Rue"	Ellen Harvey, John Larroquette, Tammy Blanchard and The Executives	0:55
10.	"A Secretary Is Not A Toy"	Mary Faber, Michael Park, The Executives and The Secretaries	3:21
11.	"Been A Long Day"	Mary Faber, Rose Hemingway and Daniel Radcliffe	3:15
12.	"Been A Long Day (Reprise)"	Christopher Hanke, John Larroquette and Tammy Blanchard	1:30
13.	"Grand Old Ivy"	John Larroquette and Daniel Radcliffe	3:30
14.	"Paris Original"	Megan Sikora, Rose Hemingway, Ellen Harvey, Mary Faber, Tammy Blanchard and The Secretaries	4:01
15.	"Martini Time"	How To Succeed Orchestra	0:41
16.	"Finch Is in Love"	Tammy Blanchard and Daniel Radcliffe	0:58
17.	"Rosemary"	Daniel Radcliffe and Rose Hemingway	3:57
18.	"Act One Finale"	Daniel Radcliffe, Rose Hemingway and Christopher Hanke	1:35
19.	"Entr'acte"	How To Succeed Orchestra	1:06
20.	"Cinderella, Darling"	Mary Faber and The Secretaries	3:48
21.	"Happy To Keep His Dinner Warm (Reprise)"	Rose Hemingway	1:00
22.	"Love From A Heart Of Gold"	John Larroquette and Tammy Blanchard	2:55
23.	"The Executive Washroom"	Michael Park and The Executives	1:38
24.	"I Believe in You"	Daniel Radcliffe and The Executives	3:15
25.	"Pirate Dance"	How To Succeed Orchestra	1:39
26.	"I Believe in You (Reprise)"	Christopher Hanke, Daniel Radcliffe and Rose Hemingway	1:27
27.	"Brotherhood Of Man"	Daniel Radcliffe, Ellen Harvey, John Larroquette, Rob Bartlett and The Executives	5:07
28.	"Finale – The Company Way"	How To Succeed Company	1:00
29.	"Bows"	How To Succeed Orchestra and How To Succeed Company	2:08
30.	"Exit Music"	How To Succeed Orchestra	3:45
31.	"Pirate Dance (Extended Version)"	How To Succeed Orchestra	3:28
32.	"I Have Returned"	Christopher Hanke	0:11

== Chart performance ==
=== Weekly charts ===
Chart (2011)	Peak position
US Billboard 200 (Billboard)	123
US Cast Albums (Billboard)	2

=== Year-end charts ===
Chart (2011)	Position
US Cast Albums (Billboard)	5

== Credits ==
Performers

- Daniel Radcliffe – J. Pierrepont Finch
- Rose Hemingway – Rosemary Pilkington
- John Larroquette – J.B. Biggley
- Christopher Hanke – Bud Frump
- Mary Faber – Smitty
- Tammy Blanchard – Hedy LaRue
- Michael Park – Bert Bratt
- Ellen Harvey – Miss Jones
- Megan Sikora – Miss Krumholtz
- Barrett Martin – Mr. Andrews
- Nick Mayo – Mr. Gatch
- Charlie Williams – Mr. Jenkins
- Kevin Covert – Mr. Johnson/TV Announcer
- Ryan Watkinson – Mr. Matthews
- Marty Lawson – Mr. Peterson
- Joey Sorge – Mr. Thackaberry
- David Hull – Mr. Toynbee
- Rob Bartlett – Mr. Twimble/Wally Womper
- Anderson Cooper – Narrator

Musicians

- Bass – Neal Caine
- Drums – Paul Pizzuti
- Guitar – Scott Kuney
- Harp – Grace Paradise
- Horn – David Peel
- Percussion – Erik Charlston
- Piano, synth – Matt Perri
- Reeds – Lawrence Feldman, Mark Thrasher, Steve Kenyon
- Trombone – George Flynn, John Allred
- Trumpet – Nicholas Marchione, Scott Wendholt

Production personnel

- Original music and lyrics – Frank Loesser
- Producer – Robert Sher
- Musical assistance – Doug Feltch
- Engineer – Adam Long
- Assistant engineer – Johnny Lindamood, Darren Moore, Halsey Quemere, Sheldon Yellowhair
- Associate engineer – Jason Strangfeld
- Programming – Randy Cohen
- Sound mixing and editing – Adam Long, Robert Sher
- Mastering – Brad Sarno
- Music co-ordinator – Howard Jones, Jason Buell
- Music preparation – Anixter Rice Music Service
- Conductor – David Chase
- Associate conductor – Matt Perri
- Stage manager – Pat Sosnow
- Assistant stage manager – Jim Athens
- Production stage manager – Michael J. Passaro
- A&R – Brian Drutman, Evelyn Morgan
- Music business affairs – Sheryl Gold
- Liner notes – David Chase, Neil Meron, Craig Zadan
- Liner note assistant – Abe Burrows
- Packaging, design and layout – Van Dean
- Package co-ordinator – Rafaela Hernández
- Photography – Matthias Clamer, Chris Callis
- Production photography – Ari Mintz
- Production director – Obie O'Brien
- Production assistance – Donald Oliver, Gino Murphy, Mario X. Soto
- Associate producer – Adam Blanshay, Jason Buell, Scott Kirschenbaum, Gregory Rae
- Executive producer – Van Dean, Kenny Howard, Barry L. Miller
- Supervising producer – David Chase, Doug Besterman, Jon Weston
- Production facilitator – Brandon Wardell
- Technical advisor – Joel Scheuneman

Source: AllMusic

== See also ==
- Songs from How to Succeed in Business Without Really Trying, a 2012 extended play by Nick Jonas, based on the similar Broadway musical revival with Jonas replacing Radcliffe as the protagonist.
