= Rose Hemingway =

American actress, performer and singer (born 1984)

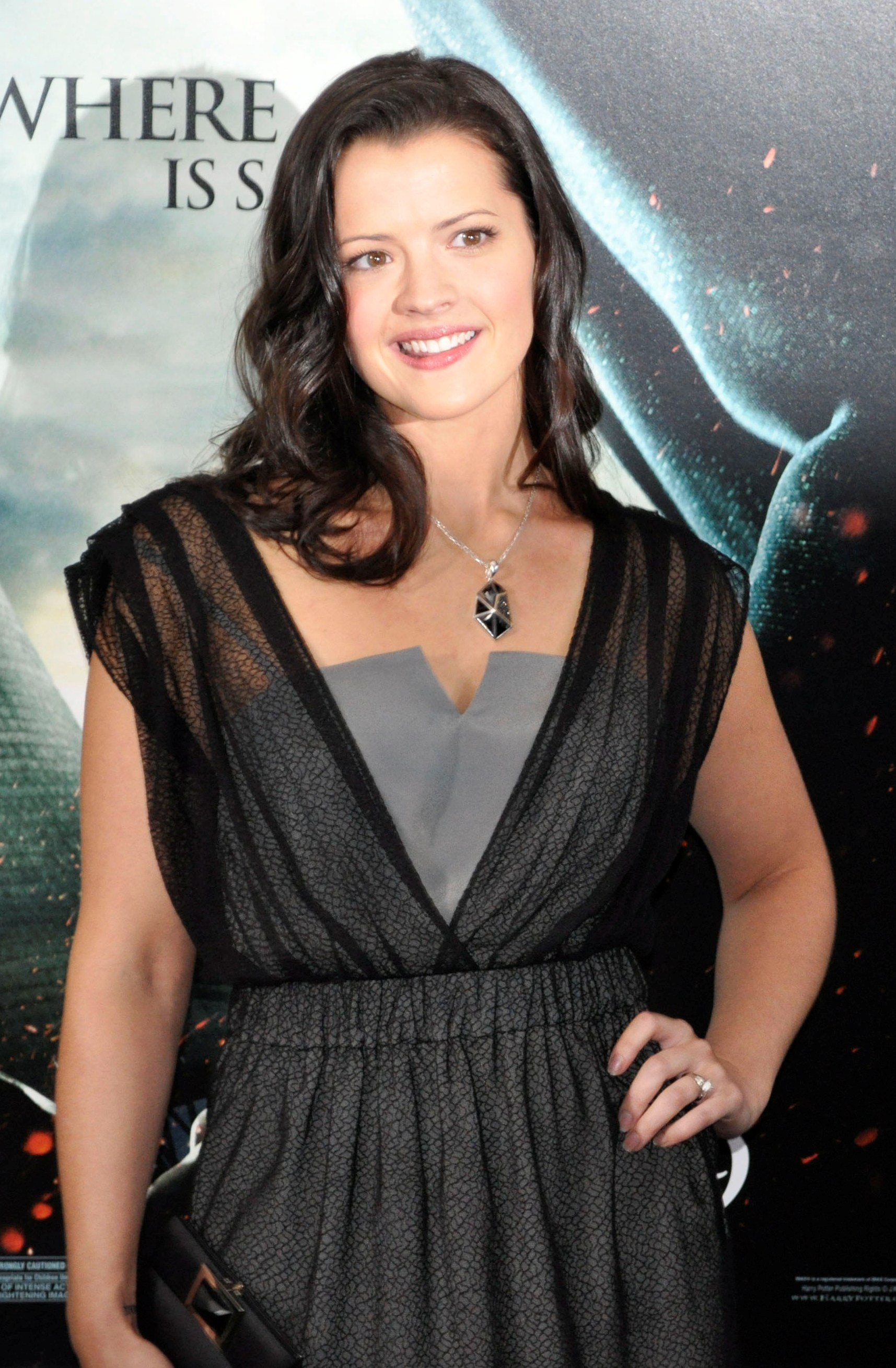
- Hemingway at the premiere of Harry Potter and the Deathly Hallows – Part 1 in November 2010.
- Born: Rosemary Szczesniak; January 1, 1984 (age 42); Philadelphia, Pennsylvania, U.S.
- Occupations: Actress and singer
- Awards: Theatre World Award: How to Succeed in Business Without Really Trying

Rose Hemingway (née Sezniak or Szczesniak; born January 1, 1984) is an American actress, performer and singer. She made her Broadway debut starring as Rosemary Pilkington in the musical How to Succeed in Business Without Really Trying (2011) earning a Theatre World Award.

== Early life ==
Hemingway was born and raised in Philadelphia, with "strict Catholic" parents. Hemingway, the sixth child of nine total siblings, recalls growing up around musicals:

. . . we were only allowed to watch certain television programs, and we always watched movie musicals. That was one of the things we could watch. So, growing up, we used to put on little skits and do performances on the coffee table to imitate the movies we'd been watching, and then, I was the only one that actually took it seriously.

Hemingway attended Mount Saint Joseph Academy, an all-girls prep school just outside Philadelphia. A gymnast, she performed in multiple amateur theatre roles at the local community center, including adaptations of Peter Pan, Alice in Wonderland, and The Lion, the Witch and the Wardrobe. She joined The Rainbow Company, a youth theatre company in Philadelphia, with whom she performed across the city. Hemingway said that she "was a member of that company for most of my high school years, and I think it was there that I realized that I really wanted to pursue it professionally."

== Career ==
Her first acting credit after graduating from Catholic University of America was the lead role in the Theatreworks national tour of Junie B. Jones, which also played off-Broadway in 2006.

In 2008, she starred as the character Sophie Sheridan in the second national tour of Mamma Mia!, which had begun in Toronto, Canada, in June 2003; Hemingway left the cast in February 2009.

International and regional theatre credits include The Snow Queen (Gerda/Ensemble) at the Prince Music Theatre, A Funny Thing Happened on the Way to the Forum (Philia) at Center Stage, and Into the Woods (Cinderella) at the Annenberg Center.

Hemingway appeared in the Los Angeles transfer of the Donmar Warehouse production of the musical Parade, portraying Lila/Mary Phagan. Directed by Rob Ashford, the musical played at the Mark Taper Forum, Los Angeles, in September 2009, for a run through November 15, 2009.

She starred as Rosemary Pillkington in the 2011 Broadway revival of How to Succeed in Business Without Really Trying, also directed by Parade's Rob Ashford. After previews from February 26, the show opened on March 27, 2011, at the Al Hirschfeld Theatre, with Hemingway appearing alongside Daniel Radcliffe, Darren Criss, John Larroquette, Tammy Blanchard, Christopher J. Hanke, and Mary Faber. Steven Suskin in Variety wrote, "Newcomer Rose Hemingway is a delicious Rosemary, displaying sweet innocence mixed with an underlying sense of just what is going on in this '60s world of big business." Entertainment Weekly called her "sweet-voiced" and "button-cute". For her performance, Hemingway is a recipient of a Theatre World Award.

== Personal life ==
In November 2010, she married actor Geoffrey Hemingway, who had also appeared in the national tour of Mamma Mia!

== Acting credits ==
=== Film ===
Year	Title	Role	Notes	Ref
2004	Jargon	Person 10	Short film	
2013	Alone Time	Ann	Short film	

=== Television ===
Year	Title	Role	Notes	Ref.
2011–2015	Long Distance Relationship	Her	16 episodes	
2012–2013	The Mob Doctor	Megan	2 episodes	
2013	FutureStates	Rebecca	Episode: "Elliot King is Third"	
2014	Blue Bloods	Stephanie Rose	Episode: "Knockout Game"	

=== Theatre ===
Year	Title	Role	Venue	Ref.
2009	Parade	Mary Phagan	Mark Taper Forum, Los Angeles	
2011	How to Succeed in Business Without Really Trying	Rosemary Pilkington	Al Hirschfeld Theatre, Broadway	
2014	Time and the Conways	Hazel Conway	The Old Globe, San Diego	
2019	Rodgers + Hammerstein's Cinderella	Gabrielle	Paper Mill Playhouse, New Jersey	

== Awards and nominations ==
Year	Association	Category	Project	Result	Ref.
2011	Theater World Award		How to Succeed in Business Without Really Trying	Won	
