= Songs from How to Succeed in Business Without Really Trying =

2012 EP by Nick Jonas

EP by Nick Jonas
- Released: May 8, 2012
- Recorded: February 19, 2012
- Venue: Al Hirschfeld Theatre, Manhattan Center, New York City, New York
- Genre: Jazz; stage
- Length: 20:16
- Label: Broadway
- Producer: Robert Sher; Ken Mahoney (exec.); Van Dean (exec.); Kenny Howard (exec.)

Nick Jonas chronology
Nicholas Jonas (2004)	Songs from How to Succeed in Business Without Really Trying (2012)	Nick Jonas (2014)

Songs from How to Succeed in Business Without Really Trying is the first extended play (EP) by the American singer-songwriter Nick Jonas, released on May 8, 2012, through Broadway Records. It was produced by Robert Sher and features guest appearance by Rob Bartlett, Rose Hemingway and Ellen Harvey. All tracks featured on the record were written by American songwriter Frank Loesser, who wrote several Broadway musicals.

The EP was recorded on February 19, 2012, and consists of five songs that Jonas performs on stage, as the protagonist J. Pierrepont Finch, on the Broadway musical How to Succeed in Business Without Really Trying. Upon release, the record peaked at number three on the US Cast Albums chart on Billboard, where it charted for two weeks.

The record was complimented for its production, Jonas' vocal performance and the physical release package. To promote the EP, as well as the musical itself, Jonas appeared on some talk shows and public events, giving interviews and performing songs featured on the musical.

== Background and development ==
"The pressure comes in knowing how big a role this is, how big an opportunity this is, knowing that it's the kind of role that you need to take ownership of and really command [...] That's where the pressure comes from, I'd say, not so much from previous Finches or productions or anything like that. It's the kind of pressure that pushes you to be better, which I think is always the good kind of pressure."

– Nick Jonas, on taking the role of J. Pierrepont Finch.

The Broadway Musical How to Succeed in Business Without Really Trying began its run on March 27, 2011, with Daniel Radcliffe as the main protagonist, J. Pierrepont Finch. The musical was performed at the Al Hirschfeld Theatre, in New York City, with a total runtime of two hours and forty minutes, including one intermission. On September 7, 2011, Nick Jonas was announced as the next performer to take on the role of Finch. Jonas was scheduled to perform starting January 24 until July 1, 2012, right after Darren Criss' three-week debut as the character. Jonas discussed the character with Radcliffe, and each attended one of the other's performances.

On February 19, 2012, Jonas recorded five songs featured on the musical for a cast soundtrack. The EP was produced by Robert Sher, who also produced the revival's cast album, How to Succeed in Business Without Really Trying: Soundtrack from the Musical Comedy (2011), with Radcliffe as the lead vocalist. Executive production on the record was handled by Van Dean, Kenny Howard, and Ken Mahoney.

On April 17, 2012, the 5-song track list was announced, along with the EP's release date in May, through Broadway Records. It was also revealed that Rose Hemingway, Rob Bartlett and Ellen Harvey, who also starred alongside Jonas on the musical, would be featured in some of the tracks. Prior to the EP's release, on April 30, 2012, the song "I Believe in You" was released online. On May 20, 2012, the show closed before the end of Jonas' contract, after a total of 30 previews and 473 regular performances.

== Promotion ==
Jonas performing as J. Pierrepont Finch for the Broadway production of How to Succeed in Business Without Really Trying in 2012.

On January 26, 2012, Jonas appeared on the morning talk show Live! with Kelly to talk about his role as J. Pierrepont Finch in the revival of How To Succeed In Business Without Really Trying. There he performed "I Believe In You", a signature song from the musical. On February 14, the singer performed the song again for the Soundcheck live chat show.

Jonas performed on the first night of the annual Broadway Week on the Late Night with Jimmy Fallon, on February 20, 2012. He closed the show by singing a jazz rendition of "I Believe in You". On March 31, 2012, the singer performed songs from the musical alongside cast members during The Inner Circles Talent Show. The performance was part of a charity gala promoted by the then-Mayor of New York City, Michael Bloomberg.

For his performance as the protagonist of the musical, J. Pierrepont Finch, Jonas was honored during the 2012 Broadway Beacon Awards, which was held by Inside Broadway on June 4, 2012.

== Commercial performance and reception ==
Songs from How to Succeed in Business Without Really Trying debuted at number three on the Billboard US Cast Albums chart on May 8, 2012. On its second week, the EP dropped to number nine, before departing the chart.

The EP received positive reviews from critics. Andy Propst of Theater Mania was impressed by Jonas' voice on the recording, writing that the singer was able to bring elements to the character that complemented the song's production as well as the guest vocalists (Anderson Cooper as the narrator, and Rob Bartlett). Propst also positively noted that the EP physical release comes with a "first-class package with a full color booklet, chock-full of photographs that's worthy of a full-length cast recording".

Writing for Review Graveyard, Ian Gude gave the EP a 10 grade, stating that he enjoyed the listening experience of the record, which made him want to hear more from Jonas. He complimented the production and vocal performances, and felt that it "would be great to hear [Nick Jonas] do a Broadway album, or songs from the Great American Songbook", as the singer "has the voice, and the intelligence, to give them the treatments they deserve". On the EP's design and package production, the critic was very pleased and stated that it was "top notch", comparing it to a quality level that even full recordings sometimes lack.

== Track listing ==
All tracks are written by Frank Loesser and produced by Robert Sher.

Songs from How to Succeed in Business Without Really Trying track listing
No.	Title	Length
1.	"How to Succeed"	3:13
2.	"Company Way" (featuring Rob Bartlett)	2:55
3.	"Rosemary" (featuring Rose Hemingway)	4:08
4.	"I Believe in You"	4:54
5.	"Brotherhood of Man" (featuring Rob Bartlett and Ellen Harvey)	5:06
Total length:		20:16

== Personnel ==
Credits are adapted from the EP's liner notes.

=== Musicians ===
- Nick Jonas – lead vocals
- Rob Bartlett – guest vocals
- Rose Hemingway – guest vocals
- Ellen Harvey – guest vocals
- Anderson Cooper – narrator

=== Production ===
- Robert Sher – producer, mixer
- Ken Mahoney – executive producer
- Adam Long – chief recording engineer, mixer
- Kevin Reeves – mastering
- Matt Barnaba – assistant
- Ben Cook – assistant
- Ginno Murphy – assistant
- Joseph Weiss – coordinator
- David Chase – supervising producer
- Doug Besterman – supervising producer, orchestrator
- Jon Weston – supervising producer
- Van Dean – design, executive producer
- Ari Mintz – photography
- Chris Callis – photography
- Kenny Howard – executive producer
- Johnny Lindamood – assistant recording Engineer
- Darren Moore – assistant recording Engineer
- Halsey Quemere – assistant Recording engineer
- Sheldon Yellowhair – assistant recording engineer
- Joel Scheuneman – chief technical advisor
- OBie O'Brien – audio director, video producer
- David Chase – arrangements, conductor, music director
- Matt Perri – associate conductor
- Howard Joines – music coordinator
- Frank Loesser – songwriter

== Charts ==
Chart performance for Songs from How to Succeed in Business Without Really Trying
Chart (2012)	Peak position
US Cast Albums (Billboard)	3

== Release history ==
Songs from How to Succeed in Business Without Really Trying release history
Region	Date	Format(s)	Label	Ref.
United States	May 8, 2012	CD	Broadway Records	
Canada	May 8, 2012	CD	Broadway Records	
Various	May 8, 2012	Digital download; streaming	Broadway Records	
