= Robert Sher =

Robert Sher is a producer of Broadway cast recordings and musicals. He is best known for his work producing cast albums, including the Grammy nominated recordings of The Music Man (2022) starring Hugh Jackman and Sutton Foster; Desperate Measures (2018); Nice Work If You Can Get It (2012) starring Kelli O'Hara and Matthew Broderick; How to Succeed in Business Without Really Trying (2011) starring Daniel Radcliffe and John Laroquette; Fela! (2010); the 30th Anniversary Cast Recording of Ain't Misbehavin' (2009) starring Ruben Studdard; Gypsy (2008) starring Patti Lupone; and The Wizard of Oz.

Other important producing credits include Cast Recordings of Yiddish Fiddler on the Roof (2019), On the Town (2015); Doctor Zhivago (2015); Dr. Seuss' How the Grinch Stole Christmas! The Musical (2013); Sherry! (2003) starring Nathan Lane, Carol Burnett, Bernadette Peters, and Tommy Tune; Songs from How to Succeed in Business Without Really Trying (2012) an EP by Nick Jonas; Rags (1991) with Julia Migenes replacing Teresa Stratas; and over a dozen other musicals dating back to the early 1980s, such as Sugar Babies (1983). Sher is credited for tracking down the score to James Lipton's Sherry!, after Lipton believed it to have been destroyed. He was a producer for the 2015 film Gypsy: Live from the Savoy Theatre.

Sher's mother was in the 1941 cast of Best Foot Forward and was featured on Arthur Godfrey's Talent Scouts. As a teenager, Sher was befriended by Bruce Yeko (founder of Origincal Cast Records) and Stan Freeman. These friendships eventually led to the production of a cast recording of Lovely Ladies, Kind Gentlemen with Mickey Rooney, Lou Diamond Phillips and Robert Morse (replacing Charles Nelson Reilly, who recorded several numbers before dropping the project), conducted by Peter Matz. This recording was never completed because Yeko ran out of funding, though Sher, as producer, retains the master recordings. The podcast Behind the Curtain: Broadway's Living Legends (produced by the Broadway Podcast Network) called Sher one of the "industry's most respected record producers."
