= Cry-Baby (musical) =

2007 musical

- Music: Adam Schlesinger
- Lyrics: David Javerbaum
- Book: Mark O'Donnell; Thomas Meehan
- Basis: Cry-Baby by John Waters
- Productions: 2007 La Jolla Playhouse; 2008 Broadway; 2012 St. Louis; 2015 Melbourne; 2018 Sydney; 2019 Wellington; 2020 Rackheath; 2024 Eye of the Storm Productions; 2024 Vågen Videregående Skole; 2025 Off West End

Cry-Baby is a musical based on the 1990 John Waters film of the same name. The music is by Adam Schlesinger, lyrics by David Javerbaum and the book is by Mark O'Donnell and Thomas Meehan, who had previously done the book for the musical Hairspray, also based on a John Waters film of the same name.

The musical focuses on Baltimore teenager Allison Vernon-Williams, who is drawn across the tracks from her 1954 finishing-school background into a relationship with the orphaned Wade "Cry-Baby" Walker, the leader of a pack of rebel outcasts.

== Production history ==
The musical premiered at the La Jolla Playhouse in San Diego, California on November 18, 2007 and ran through to December 16. Previews began on Broadway at the Marquis Theatre on March 15, 2008, with an official opening on April 24, 2008. Directed by Mark Brokaw with choreography by Rob Ashford, the cast featured Harriet Harris and James Snyder as "Cry-Baby".

The Broadway production closed following the matinée performance on June 22. The show played 45 previews and 68 performances.

A cast recording featuring most of the original Broadway cast was released on October 7, 2015.

According to Javerbaum, the show was remounted by New Line Theatre in St. Louis, Missouri in March 2012. It had a smaller band, reduced to six pieces, and a smaller cast of 16. The show was re-orchestrated and revised by the original composers and writers for the Saint Louis production. It was the first production of the show to be done since Broadway.

In May 2015, The Henegar Center in Melbourne, Florida, was the first community theatre granted permission to produce Cry-Baby: The Musical. The production was directed by Artistic Director, Hank Rion and choreographed by Amanda Cheyenne Manis.

The show premiered in Australia in July 2018, at the Hayes Theatre in Sydney.

The New Zealand premiere of the musical took place in Wellington at Te Auaha in September 2019.

The European premiere of the musical took place in Sandnes, Norway at Vågen videregående skole in November 2024.

From 6 March to 12 April 2025, Cry-Baby the Musical had its first Off West End London run at the Arcola Theatre in Hackney, directed by Mehmet Ergen. The production starred Adam Davidson, Lulu-Mae Pears, Elliot Allinson, and Jazzy Phoenix.

== Plot ==
=== Act I ===
In Baltimore 1954, the first annual Anti-Polio Picnic and Vaccination Carnival is being overseen by Mrs. Vernon Williams, the president of Baltimore Women’s Club. Baldwin and the Whiffles lead a group called "The Squares" made up of well-behaved teens (“The Anti-Polio Picnic”). Their performance is interrupted by a rival group, "the Drapes", who enjoy terrorising the Squares (“Watch Your A**”). Wade “Cry-Baby” Walker arrives to receive his polio vaccine. Allison, Mrs. Williams' granddaughter is particularly taken by him which unnerves her (“I’m Infected”).

Baldwin and the Whiffles perform (“Squeaky Clean”) at the Maidnenhead Country Club for Safety Awareness Day. Cry-Baby and his loyal trio interrupt and he invites Allison to the Jukebox Jamboree, though Mrs Williams forbades this. This deeply upsets Cry-Baby. (“Nobody Gets Me”). Allison questions being a Square and sets off the emergency alarm, sending the everyone into a panic. Amidst the chaos, she sneaks off with Cry-Baby (“Nobody Gets Me – Reprise”).

At the Jamboree, Cry-Baby's friends are trying to deter a girl, Lenora, who's obsessed with him. They then give advice to Allison on how to be a bad girl (“A Whole Lot Worse”). Lenora then sings a ballad about her mental health and love of Cry-Baby (“Screw Loose”). Dupree, who's emceeing, introduces Cry-Baby and the Teardrops onto the stage (“Baby, Baby, Baby, Baby (Baby, Baby) Baby”).

Afterwards, Allison and Cry-Baby drive to a spot in Turkey Point, where they grow closer (“Girl, Can I Kiss You with Tongue?”). He gifts Allison a gold-plated guitar-pick (“I’m Infected – Reprise”). However, their moment is interrupted by a sudden wildfire. Immediately blaming Cry-Baby, Baldwin has him and the Drapes arrested, where they are put on trial (“You Can’t Beat the System”).

The Judge finds them guilty and they are sent off to jail. Lenora claims she is pregnant with Cry-Baby's child which shocks Allison and the courthouse, as he is taken away.

=== Act II ===
At home, Allison longs for Cry-Baby (“Misery, Agony, Helplessness, Hopelessness, Heartache and Woe”). Baldwin informs her that the Whiffles will be performing at a newly built theme park to celebrate the Fourth of July, to which she hesitantly agrees to sing. Her grandmother finds her crying and comforts her (“Misery, Agony, Helplessness, Hopelessness, Heartache and Woe – Reprise”).

At a jewellery store, Baldwin and Lenora bond over their dislike of each others respective love interests as they shop for wedding rings (“All in My Head”).

Dupree, now imprisoned, works on the farm creating license plate presses (“Jailyard Jubilee”). Cry-Baby hears Baldwin and Allison get engaged over the radio and becomes enraged. Dupree attempts to calm him down but he starts a riot (“A Little Upset”). During the uproar, Cry-Baby escapes, heading straight for Allison.

He turns up at her house and her Mrs. Williams helps him avoid the police. She overhears Baldwin admitting to the Whiffles that he framed Cry-Baby for the arson at Turkey Point (“I Did Something Wrong Once”). She settles on doing the right thing.

At the Star-Spangled Funland, the Whiffles, with Allison, perform (“Thanks for the Nifty Country”). After exposing Baldwin's confession, the Judge, Mrs. Williams and a newly exonerated Cry-Baby arrive at the theme park. Judge Stone sentences Baldwin, the true culprit to hard time in prison. Still vying for Allison, Baldwin challenges Cry-Baby to a musical battle for her heart (“This Amazing Offer”). Cry-Baby wins (“Do That Again”).

Lenora, not actually pregnant, arrives with his "baby", a teddy bear, and states that she now loves Baldwin instead. Mrs. Williams, now accepting of Cry-Baby and Allison's relationship, asks him to be a part of their family. (“Nothing Bad’s Ever Gonna Happen Again”).

== Original cast and characters ==
Character	Broadway (2008)
Wade "Crybaby" Walker	James Snyder
Allison Vernon-Williams	Elizabeth Stanley
Mrs. Vernon-Williams	Harriet Sansom Harris
Baldwin	Christopher Hanke
Lenora Frigid	Alli Mauzey
Dupree	Chester Gregory
Pepper	Carly Jibson
Wanda	Lacey Kohl
Skippy Wagstaff	Ryan Silverman
Mona	Tory Ross

== Musical numbers ==
Act I

- "The Anti-Polio Picnic" - Mrs. Vernon-Williams, The Whiffles, Allison, Baldwin, Square Ensemble
- "Watch Your Ass" - Pepper, Wanda, Mona “Hatchet-Face”, Dupree, Cry-Baby, Drape Ensemble
- "I'm Infected" - Allison, Cry-Baby
- "Squeaky Clean" - Baldwin, Allison, The Whiffles
- "Nobody Gets Me" - Cry-Baby, Pepper, Wanda, Mona “Hatchet-Face”, Ensemble
- "Nobody Gets Me (Reprise)" - Allison
- "Jukebox Jamboree" - Dupree
- "A Whole Lot Worse" - Pepper, Wanda, Mona “Hatchet-Face”, Allison
- "Screw Loose" - Lenora
- "Baby Baby Baby Baby Baby (Baby Baby)" - Cry-Baby, Allison, Drape Ensemble
- "Girl, Can I Kiss You With Tongue?" - Cry-Baby, Allison, Drape Ensemble
- "I'm Infected (Reprise)" - Allison
- "You Can't Beat the System" - Company

Act II

- "Misery, Agony, Helplessness, Hopelessness, Heartache and Woe" - Allison, Cry-Baby, Dupree, Pepper, Wanda, Mona “Hatchet-Face”, Ensemble
- "Misery, Agony, Helplessness, Hopelessness, Heartache and Woe (Reprise)" - Mrs. Vernon-Williams
- "All in My Head" - Baldwin, Lenora, Cry-Baby, Allison, Cry-Baby Doubles, Alison Doubles
- "Jailyard Jubilee" - Dupree
- "A Little Upset" - Cry-Baby, Dupree, Drape Ensemble
- "I Did Something Wrong...Once" - Mrs. Vernon-Williams
- "Thanks for the Nifty Country!" - Baldwin, The Whiffles
- "This Amazing Offer" - Baldwin, The Whiffles
- "Do That Again" - Cry-Baby
- "Nothing Bad's Ever Gonna Happen Again" - Company

== Critical response ==
Cry-Baby received mixed reviews. The Wall Street Journal critic Terry Teachout wrote that the musical "is campy, cynical, totally insincere and fabulously well crafted. And funny. Madly, outrageously funny." Similarly, Newsday offered that the musical is "pleasantly demented and - deep in the sweet darkness of its loopy heart - more true to the cheerful subversion of a John Waters movie than its sentimental big sister Hairspray."

In contrast, The New York Times critic Ben Brantley wrote that the show is "without flavor: sweet, sour, salty, putrid or otherwise. This show in search of an identity has all the saliva-stirring properties of week-old pre-chewed gum.... Mr. Ashford brings his customary gymnastic vigor to the choreography: lots of revved-up jumping jacks, push-ups and leg lifts, usually led by a trio of athletic muscle boys." Variety added that "watered-down Waters has yielded a flavorless Broadway musical that revels in its down-and-dirtiness yet remains stubbornly synthetic. There's a lot of talent, sass and sweat onstage, particularly in the dance department, plus a sprinkling of wit in the show's good-natured vulgarity. But somehow, it never quite ignites." The New York Sun opined that "Cry-Baby is content to stay in the shallow end and focus on a standard wrong-side-of-the-tracks tale.... But rather than supply a jolt of not-too-outsider-energy, [the songwriters] have instead coasted on their magpie skills, tossing out an undistinguished stream of pastiche numbers. The lyrics occasionally have a welcome crispness.... The songs themselves, however, are as generic as the lyrics are pointed: It's the first time I can recall forgetting a show's melodies before they were even finished."

USA Today wrote "The rockabilly-inspired numbers that David Javerbaum and Adam Schlesinger have crafted for Cry-Baby aren't as ambitious or infectious [as Hairspray], but the show is similarly good-hearted, and has more of a Waters edge. Javerbaum and Schlesinger's lyrics and Mark O'Donnell and Thomas Meehan's book are both more inventively crass and less snarky than those of other contemporary musical winkfests; you get the sense that these writers share Waters' affection for his goofy subjects."

== Awards and nominations ==
=== Original Broadway production ===
Year	Award Ceremony	Category	Nominee	Result
2008	Tony Award	Best Musical		Nominated
2008	Tony Award	Best Book of a Musical	Mark O'Donnell and Thomas Meehan	Nominated
2008	Tony Award	Best Original Score	David Javerbaum and Adam Schlesinger	Nominated
2008	Tony Award	Best Choreography	Rob Ashford	Nominated
2008	Drama Desk Award	Outstanding Choreography	Rob Ashford	Won
