= Catch Me If You Can (play) =

1965 play by Jack Weinstock and Willie Gilbert

- Written by: Jack Weinstock and Willie Gilbert
- Original language: English
- Genre: Comedy
- Setting: A summer cottage in the Catskill Mountains. Labor Day Weekend.

Premiere
- Date premiered: March 2, 1965
- Place premiered: Morosco Theatre, New York City

Catch Me if You Can is a play by Jack Weinstock and Willie Gilbert that is taken from a French play by Robert Thomas entitled Trap for a Lonely Man. The work premiered on Broadway at the Morosco Theatre on March 2, 1965 and closed after 111 performances on June 5, 1965. The production was directed by Vincent J. Donehue and starred Tom Bosley, Dan Dailey, Bethel Leslie, George Mathews, Patrick McVey, Eli Mintz, and Jo Tract. It was produced by the Samuel French Incorporation at The House of Plays.
