= Breaking Fast =

2020 American romantic comedy film

- Theatrical release poster
- Directed by: Mike Mosallam
- Written by: Mike Mosallam
- Produced by: Sarah Bazzi; Bay Dariz; Seth Hauer; Alex Lampsos
- Starring: Haaz Sleiman; Michael Cassidy; Amin El Gamal; Patrick Sabongui
- Cinematography: Anka Malatynska
- Edited by: Mike Hugo
- Music by: Omar Fadel
- Production companies: Mike Mosallam Productions; Minutehand Pictures
- Distributed by: Vertical Entertainment
- Release date: March 7, 2020 (Cinequest)
- Running time: 92 minutes
- Country: United States
- Language: English

Breaking Fast is a 2020 American romantic comedy film, directed by Mike Mosallam and released in 2020. An expansion of Mosallam's 2015 short film of the same title, the film stars Haaz Sleiman as Mo, a gay Muslim doctor in Los Angeles who is emotionally closed off following a painful breakup with his former partner Hassan (Patrick Sabongui); on the first day of Ramadan he meets Kal (Michael Cassidy), getting to know him over nightly iftars.

The film premiered on March 7, 2020, at the Cinequest Film & Creativity Festival; due to the COVID-19 pandemic, it was screened digitally by several LGBT film festivals through the next several months. It was picked up for commercial distribution by Vertical Entertainment in August 2020.

== Cast ==
- Haaz Sleiman as Mo
- Michael Cassidy as Kal
- Amin El Gamal as Sam
- Patrick Sabongui as Hassan
- Christopher J. Hanke as John
- Rula Gardenier as Mama
- Veronica Cartwright as Judy
- Aline Elasmar as Muna

== Production and Release ==
In February 2019, Deadline reported that Haaz Sleiman and Michael Cassidy had been slated to star in Breaking Fast, a gay romantic comedy about a Muslim man living in West Hollywood. It was to be based on director Mike Mosallam's 2015 short film of the same name, which had screened at the 2016 Cannes Film Festival. Amin El Gamal, Patrick Sabongui, Christopher J. Hanke, Brian Dare, Aline Elasmar and Veronica Cartwright were also announced as cast members.

Mosallam decided to write the movie after a conversation with fellow screenwriter Michael Lannan, during which he realized there were no characters in movies or television who represented him. He also intended for the movie to be a homage to classic romantic comedies, saying he envisioned the kind of movie that would star actress Julia Roberts "if, in fact, she was a gay, Muslim, Arab man living in West Hollywood, California.”

In March 2020, the film made its debut at California's Cinequest Film & Creativity Festival. It had subsequent digital screenings at other festivals such as Toronto's Inside Out Film Festival and San Francisco's Frameline. In August 2020, it was reported that Vertical Entertainment had acquired the North American distribution rights to the movie.

In December 2020, the official trailer was released. The film was made available digitally and on demand on January 22, 2021.

== Reception ==
=== Critical response ===
On review aggregator website Rotten Tomatoes, the film holds an approval rating of 96% based on 25 reviews, with an average rating of 7.5/10.

=== Accolades ===
Year	Award	Category	Recipient(s)	Result	Ref.
2022	GLAAD Media Awards	GLAAD Media Award for Outstanding Film – Limited Release	Breaking Fast	Nominated	
