= Willie Gilbert =

American author & playwright (1916–1980)

- Born: William Gomberg; February 24, 1916; Cleveland, Ohio, USA
- Died: December 2, 1980 (aged 64); New York City, New York, USA
- Occupations: Author and playwright

Willie Gilbert (24 February 1916 – 2 December 1980) was an American author and playwright.

Born William Gomberg in Cleveland, Ohio, Gilbert's proclivity for creating gags emerged as the humor writer for the Glenville High School Torch on which he worked alongside future playwright Jerome Lawrence and the creators of Superman, Jerry Siegel and Joe Shuster.

After earning a BS in education he moved to New York City to pursue a career as a comedian. There he discovered that his physician, Jack Weinstock, had a skill for writing, and soon the two were contributing sketch comedy to night-club performers including Kaye Ballard and Eileen Barton, and then to the Broadway review Tickets Please. They worked extensively in early television, particularly the children's programs Howdy Doody and Tom Corbett, Space Cadet, although they also sold material to such mainstream performers as Jackie Gleason. They achieved their first Broadway success as co-authors of the book for How to Succeed in Business Without Really Trying in 1962, for which they shared in two Tony Awards.

Later, Gilbert and Weinstock wrote the books for Hot Spot, which starred Judy Holliday, and Catch Me If You Can, a murder mystery based on a French play by Robert Thomas. Weinstock died in 1969, as the team was writing another Broadway musical, The Candy Store.

In the 1970s, Gilbert returned to children's television, writing gags for Yogi Bear, Scooby-Doo and other Hanna-Barbera characters. Gilbert died in New York City. His last writing project was on Yogi's First Christmas.
