= Christopher Hanke =

American actor (born 1976)

- Born: Christopher Jason Hanke; March 18, 1976 (age 50); Hot Springs, Arkansas, US
- Other name: Christopher J. Hanke
- Occupations: Actor, singer
- Years active: 2009–present
- Known for: Acting

Christopher Jason Hanke, often credited as Christopher J. Hanke, (born March 18, 1976) is an American actor and singer known for his roles on Broadway and television.

== Early life ==
Hanke was born in Hot Springs, Arkansas, the oldest of five children. He spent his childhood in Hot Springs Village, Arkansas. Hanke was accepted to medical school, but decided to defer his admission.

== Career ==
Hanke has played leading roles in various Broadway and off-Broadway shows. His roles have included Ethan Girard in the national tour of The Full Monty (2002) and Nick Piazza in Fame on 42nd Street (2003, off-Broadway); and on Broadway as J.T. in In My Life (2005), Mark Cohen in Rent (2007) and Baldwin in Cry-Baby (2008); and Claude in Hair (2008 – Central Park production).

Hanke has also appeared on television, playing the series regular role of the inexperienced transplant coordinator Ryan Abbott on the CBS TV series Three Rivers. He had a guest-starring role on ABC's Brothers & Sisters in 2010. He also has a recurring role in the television show Big Love as a Mormon intern in the State Senate.

Hanke appeared on Broadway as Bud Frump in Rob Ashford's 2011 revival of How to Succeed in Business Without Really Trying, alongside Daniel Radcliffe who played the lead role of J. Pierrepont Finch, and his replacement Darren Criss. Hanke replaced Michael Urie in the Off-Broadway solo comedy "Buyer & Cellar," at the Barrow Street Theatre, from March 18, 2014, until its closing on July 27. From June 23–30, 2015, he played "Corny Collins" in Hairspray at The Muny.

On October 7, 2015, a cast recording of Cry-Baby was released, featuring most of the original cast, including Hanke as Baldwin.

In 2016, he was cast as Fabian on Devious Maids. His character is a hairdresser and a self-proclaimed "hair magician".

== Filmography ==
The following is a list of Hanke's acting projects as compiled on the Internet Movie Database.

=== Film ===
Year	Title	Role	Notes
2009	Clear Blue Tuesday	Samantha's Boyfriend	
2013	The Hearing	Tommy Wolfe	Short
2020	Breaking Fast	John	

=== Television ===
Year	Title	Role	Notes
2009–2010	Three Rivers	Ryan Abbott	13 episodes
2010	Brothers & Sisters	Marcus	Episode: "An Ideal Husband"
2011	Big Love	Stuart	5 episodes
2011	Late Show with David Letterman	Bud Frump	1 episode
2012	The Client List	Luke	Episode: "Acting Up"
2013	Major Crimes	Stewart Ness	Episode: "False Pretenses"
2015–2017	Odd Mom Out	Devon	9 episodes
2016	Devious Maids	Fabian	3 episodes
2017	Kevin Can Wait	Parker	2 episodes
2017	Younger	Deane	Episode: "The Gelato and the Pube"
2019–2024	After Forever	Stefan	7 episodes
2020	I Know This Much Is True	Thad	Episode: "Two"
2021–2023	The Resident	Gregg	6 episodes
2022–2023	A Million Little Things	Dr. Ashley Anderson	6 episodes

=== Voice acting ===
Year	Title	Role	Notes
2013	Grand Theft Auto V	The Local Population	Video game
2013	Grand Theft Auto Online	The Local Population	Video game
2019	Anthem: Homunculus	Fintan	Podcast series
