= Mary Faber =

American actress (born 1979)

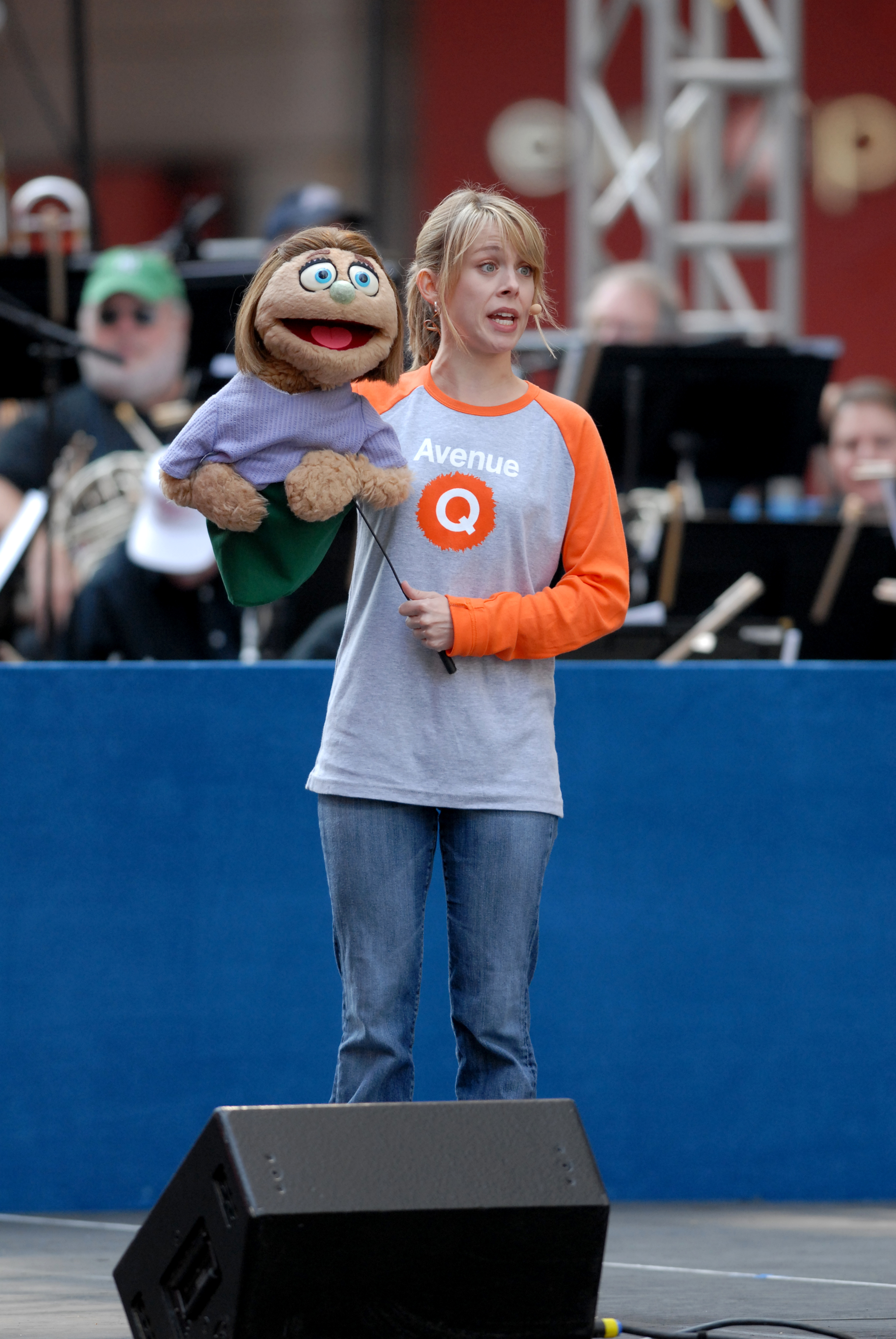
- Faber in 2006
- Born: August 8, 1979 (age 47); Greenville, South Carolina, U.S.
- Education: Brandeis University (BA)
- Occupation: Actress
- Years active: 2005–present
- Spouse: Gabe Witcher (m. 2013)
- Website: maryfaber.com

Mary Faber (born August 8, 1979) is an American actress.

== Stage career ==
Faber made her Broadway debut on December 26, 2005, replacing Stephanie D'Abruzzo in the musical Avenue Q as Kate Monster and Lucy T. Slut. Starting October 30, 2006, she took a leave of absence from Avenue Q to appear as Clea in the Playwright's Horizon's production of Floyd and Clea Under the Western Sky. Faber returned to Avenue Q on December 19, 2006. Faber's last appearance in Avenue Q was on October 9, 2008.

Faber has appeared in off-Broadway shows including Saved! at Playwright's Horizons, Slut, and The Tutor. Faber also previously worked in the Theatreworks musical Junie B. Jones. She helped to develop the character of Natalie in Feeling Electric (which would eventually be redeveloped into the Pulitzer Prize-winning Next to Normal).

Faber originated the role of Heather in the musical American Idiot while the show was being developed at Berkeley Repertory Theatre. She continued the role of Heather from the opening of its Broadway run until December 12, 2010.

She starred as Smitty in the 2011 revival How to Succeed in Business Without Really Trying alongside Daniel Radcliffe and John Larroquette, from the opening of the run until February 26, 2012.

Faber had a recurring role on Parks and Recreation as Pawnee restaurant lobbyist Kathryn Pinewood and has also made guest appearances on Nurse Jackie and The Good Wife.

In 2025, she returned to the stage in Bat Boy: The Musical as Lorraine at New York City Center, Off-Broadway.

== Personal life ==
Faber is a graduate of Brandeis University. She married Gabe Witcher, a musician and member of the Punch Brothers, in 2013.

== Filmography ==
=== Television ===
Year	Title	Role	Notes
2010	The Good Wife	Natalie	Episode: "Poisoned Pill"
2011	Nurse Jackie	Maureen	Episode: "Have You Met Mr. Jones?"
2012–2014	Parks and Recreation	Kathryn Pinewood	6 episodes
2014	Hulk and the Agents of S.M.A.S.H.	Medusa, Crystal (voice)	Episode: "Inhuman Nature"
2015	Ultimate Spider-Man	Medusa (voice)	Episode: "Inhumanity"
2015	The Brink	Ashley	4 episodes
2016	Hairspray Live!	Understudy Velma, Prudy, Health Ed Teacher	Television film
2016–2020	Doc McStuffins	Quackson, Karaoke Katie (voice)	5 episodes
2016–2018	Mighty Magiswords	Morbidia, Gracie, Snow Hat, Squirrel, Owl, Kotassian Kid (voice)	15 episodes
2018	Mom	Maria	Episode: "Ocular Fluid and Fighting Robots"
2018	Kidding	Macy	7 episodes
2019	Archibald's Next Big Thing	Miss Frog (voice)	Episode: "The Secret of Madame Baroness"
2020–2021	The Fungies!	Teacher Terry (voice)	Recurring role
2020–2023	Big City Greens	Additional voices	8 episodes
2022–2023	The Boss Baby: Back in the Crib	Tina Templeton (voice)	28 episodes

=== Film ===
Year	Title	Role	Notes
2021	The Addams Family 2	Miss Lurleen, Texas Lady, Pageant Lady, PA announcer (voice)	
2021	Evangelion: 1.0 You Are (Not) Alone	Ritsuko Akagi (voice)	Amazon Prime Video English dub
2021	Evangelion: 2.0 You Can (Not) Advance	Ritsuko Akagi (voice)	Amazon Prime Video English dub
2021	Evangelion: 3.0 You Can (Not) Redo	Ritsuko Akagi (voice)	Amazon Prime Video English dub
2021	Evangelion: 3.0+1.0 Thrice Upon a Time	Ritsuko Akagi (voice)	Amazon Prime Video English dub

=== Video games ===
Year	Title	Role	Notes
2013	Marvel Heroes	Jean DeWolff, She-Hulk, Spider-Girl	
2013	Grand Theft Auto V	The Local Population	
2014	Elder Scrolls Online	Female Breton, Female Bosmer	
2019	Marvel Ultimate Alliance 3: The Black Order	Crystal, Medusa	
2023	DreamWorks All-Star Kart Racing	Tina Templeton	
