= Jack Weinstock =

American dramatist (1905–1969)

- Born: Jacob Lawrence Weinstock; May 15, 1905; New York City, New York, U.S.
- Died: May 23, 1969 (aged 64); New York City, New York, U.S.
- Education: Morris High School; Columbia College; New York University College of Medicine
- Occupations: Author, playwright
- Years active: 1949 – 1967
- Spouse(s): Dorothy Abrahams (m. 1933)
- Awards: Tony Award for Best Author; NY Drama Critics Circle Award for Best Musical; Pulitzer Prize for Drama; 1962; How to Succeed in Business Without Really Trying

Jacob Lawrence "Dr. Jack" Weinstock (May 15, 1905 – May 23, 1969) was an American playwright, author, urologist, and surgeon, best known for co-authoring the musical book for How to Succeed in Business Without Really Trying, for which he and his onetime patient and longtime writing partner, Willie Gilbert, received both a Tony Award and New York Drama Critics Award, as well as the Pulitzer Prize.

== Early life and career ==
Born in New York City on May 15, 1905, Weinstock was one of four children born to Russian immigrant parents Esther and Hyman Weinstock. He attended Morris High School in the Bronx, as well as Columbia College and New York University College of Medicine. It was during his time at Columbia that Weinstock's affinity for comedy writing first surfaced, with occasional contributions to the Columbia Spectator. He discussed this evolution during a 1958 interview with the Lancaster Sunday News.

I used to write for the Columbia humor magazine and when I went into medical practice, I did humor writing as a hobby. Many doctors write, play music, or paint as hobbies. It's a form of artistic release for a man in a very precise profession. Then I was doing it just for fun, but now I work on the writing nights and weekends and no longer have time for a hobby as such.

When asked whether this extensive moonlighting might not have hampered his performance as a physician, Weinstock was quick to point out that his scripting sideline, in particular the Howdy Doody connection, was more a help than a hindrance. "You'd be surprised how cooperative a difficult youngster undergoing examination or treatment becomes when I talk about Howdy Doody. " One year later, Weinstock himself was the surprised party, when, while embarked on a globe-trotting vacation to destinations ranging from Hawaii to Hong Kong, Tokyo, New Delhi, and Bangkok, children of Americans abroad proved every bit as devoted a Doody fan base as their stateside contemporaries.

Weinstock and Gilbert also co-authored the play Catch Me If You Can, and wrote the book for the musical Hot Spot.

== Personal life and death ==
On December 17, 1933, Weinstock married Dorothy Abrahams. They had two children, both daughters.

On May 23 1969, following a lengthy illness, Weinstock died at his Manhattan home, eight days after his 64th birthday. (Note: Although the obituaries appear to be unanimous in giving his age as 62 (thus implying a 1907 birth date), they are definitively overruled, both by Weinstock himself–via his 1940 WWII draft registration card, in which he clearly gives his age as 35, and his birth date as May 15, 1905—and by Weinstock and, before him, his parents, via every available relevant U.S. Census form, from 1910 on..) He was survived by his wife and daughters, his three siblings, and six grandchildren.

== Filmography ==
- Captain Video and His Video Rangers (1949–1955)
- Tales of Tomorrow
  - Ep. "Past Tense" (1953), story by Robert F. Lewine
- Rod Brown of the Rocket Rangers (1953)
- The Bob Smith Show (1954–1955)
- The Howdy Doody Show (1956–1958)
- The Funny Manns (1961)
