= How to Succeed in Business Without Really Trying (musical) =

1961 musical by Frank Loesser, Abe Burrows, and Willie Gilbert

- 1961 Original Cast Album
- Music: Frank Loesser
- Lyrics: Frank Loesser
- Book: Abe Burrows; Jack Weinstock; Willie Gilbert
- Basis: How to Succeed in Business Without Really Trying by Shepherd Mead
- Premiere: October 14, 1961: 46th Street Theatre
- Productions: 1961 Broadway; 1963 West End; 1995 Broadway revival 1996 US tour 2011 Broadway revival 2023 offie
- Awards: 1962 Pulitzer Prize for Drama; Tony Award for Best Musical; Tony Award for Best Book

How to Succeed in Business Without Really Trying is a 1961 musical by Frank Loesser and book by Abe Burrows, Jack Weinstock, and Willie Gilbert, based on Shepherd Mead's 1952 book of the same name. The story concerns young, ambitious J. Pierrepont Finch, who, with the help of the book How to Succeed in Business Without Really Trying, rises from window washer to chairman of the board of the World Wide Wicket Company.

The musical, starring Robert Morse and Rudy Vallée, opened at the 46th Street Theatre on Broadway in October 1961, running for 1,417 performances. The show won seven Tony Awards, the New York Drama Critics' Circle award, and the 1962 Pulitzer Prize for Drama.

In 1967, a film based on the musical was released by United Artists, with Morse, Vallee, Sammy Smith, and Ruth Kobart re-creating their stage roles.

A 1995 revival was mounted at the same theatre as the original production (now named the Richard Rodgers Theatre). It ran for 548 performances and starred Matthew Broderick and Megan Mullally. A 50th-anniversary Broadway revival directed and choreographed by Rob Ashford and starring Daniel Radcliffe and John Larroquette opened on March 27, 2011, at the Al Hirschfeld Theatre and ran for 473 performances.

== History ==
In 1952, Shepherd Mead's satirical book, How to Succeed in Business Without Really Trying, became a bestseller. Playwrights Willie Gilbert and Jack Weinstock created a dramatic interpretation in 1955 that was unproduced for five years. Agent Abe Newborn brought the work to the attention of producers Cy Feuer and Ernest H. Martin, with the intention of retooling it as a musical. Feuer and Martin had great success with the 1950 adaptation of Guys and Dolls and brought in the creative team from that show to work on How to.... Burrows and Loesser set to work on the new adaptation, with rehearsals beginning in August 1961. Burrows collaborated on the book with Jack Weinstock and Willie Gilbert, also serving as director. Their new adaptation became even more satirical and added romance to the story. Loesser wrote both music and lyrics for the show, which was orchestrated by Robert Ginzler.

The original Broadway production credited the choreography to an obscure dance director named Hugh Lambert, while the much better-known Bob Fosse received only a "musical staging by..." credit. Abe Burrows explains this in his autobiography Honest, Abe. While How to Succeed was in its early development, producer Cy Feuer attended a trade show and was extremely impressed by an elaborate dance number created by Lambert, prompting Feuer to hire Lambert to choreograph the new musical. According to Burrows, it soon became clear in rehearsals that Lambert's creative abilities were completely used up in that one elaborate dance number. Bob Fosse was brought in to replace him, but Fosse was unwilling to hurt Lambert's career by having him fired. Lambert's trade-show dance number was recycled as the "Treasure Hunt" dance in How to Succeed..., while Fosse agreed to take a "musical staging" credit for choreographing all the other dance numbers. Burrows also reveals that another crisis arose in rehearsals when former recording star Rudy Vallée wanted to interpolate some of his hit songs from the 1930s.

== Synopsis ==
=== Act I ===
J. Pierrepont Finch, a young window cleaner in New York City, reads the book How to Succeed in Business Without Really Trying as he works. The "Book Voice" tells him that he will succeed if he follows the book's advice. He enters the World Wide Wicket Company searching for a job ("How To Succeed").

Finch bumps into J. B. Biggley, the president of the company, who dismisses him to the personnel manager, Mr. Bratt. Rosemary Pilkington, an ambitious young secretary, helps Finch meet Mr. Bratt. Finch tells Bratt that Biggley sent him, and Bratt gives him a job in the mailroom, where he works with Mr. Biggley's lazy, arrogant, and nepotism-minded nephew Bud Frump. Rosemary dreams of a life with Finch in the suburbs ("Happy To Keep His Dinner Warm"). The fatigued workers rush to get their coffee break ("Coffee Break"). In the mailroom, Finch earns favor with the long-time head of the mailroom, Mr. Twimble, who tells him the secret to longevity at the company ("The Company Way").

Twimble is promoted to head of the shipping department and has to choose his replacement as head of the mailroom. The book warns not to stay in the mailroom too long, so Finch recommends Frump instead of himself. Twimble is reluctant to promote the lazy Frump, but Frump promises to be a good employee ("The Company Way (Reprise)"). Twimble and Bratt are impressed by Finch's apparent selflessness, and Bratt offers him a job as a junior executive in the Plans and Systems department, headed by Mr. Gatch.

An extremely attractive but air-headed woman named Hedy LaRue, who is Mr. Biggley's secret mistress, is hired as a secretary. On her first day of work, the male employees are instantly attracted to her, but Mr. Bratt warns them against taking advantage of their employees ("A Secretary Is Not a Toy"). Finch learns from Mr. Biggley's secretary, Miss Jones, that Biggley is a proud alumnus of Old Ivy College. In the elevator at the end of the workday, Rosemary's fellow secretary Smitty helps her and Finch set up a date ("Been a Long Day"). Frump runs into Biggley and Hedy and realizes their relationship, and he blackmails Biggley into giving him a promotion ("Been a Long Day (Reprise)").

Finch arrives early Saturday morning and sets up the office so it looks like he has been working all night. Biggley believes Finch's ruse, and Finch convinces Biggley that he, too, is a proud alumnus of Old Ivy (a "Groundhog"), and they sing the Old Ivy fight song ("Grand Old Ivy"). Biggley insists that Finch be given his own office and secretary, Hedy. With the book's help, Finch realizes that Biggley must be Hedy's advocate and sends her on an errand to Gatch, knowing that Gatch will make a pass at her. Gatch falls for the trap and is dispatched to Venezuela, and Finch is promoted to his position as head of Plans and Systems.

At a reception for the new Advertising Department head, Benjamin Burton Daniel Ovington, Rosemary hopes to impress Finch with her new "Paris original" dress, but all the other women arrive at the reception wearing the same dress ("Paris Original"). Frump schemes for Biggley to catch Finch kissing LaRue in his office, but after LaRue blackmails Finch into kissing her, he realizes he's actually in love with Rosemary ("Rosemary"). After some farcical complications, Frump and Biggley walk into the office just as Finch embraces Rosemary. Ovington is forced to resign when Biggley learns that he is a graduate from Northern State, Old Ivy's bitterest rival (a "Chipmunk"). Biggley names Finch vice-president in charge of advertising. Biggley leaves as Finch and Rosemary declare their love for each other, and Bud Frump vows revenge ("Act I Finale").

=== Act II ===
Two days later, Rosemary has been neglected by Finch. She decides to quit, but her fellow secretaries convince her to stay because she's living their dream of marrying an executive ("Cinderella, Darling"). (In the 1995 revival, this song was replaced with a reprise of "How to Succeed", with the lyrics suggesting ways in which a woman can get hold of a man's financial assets).

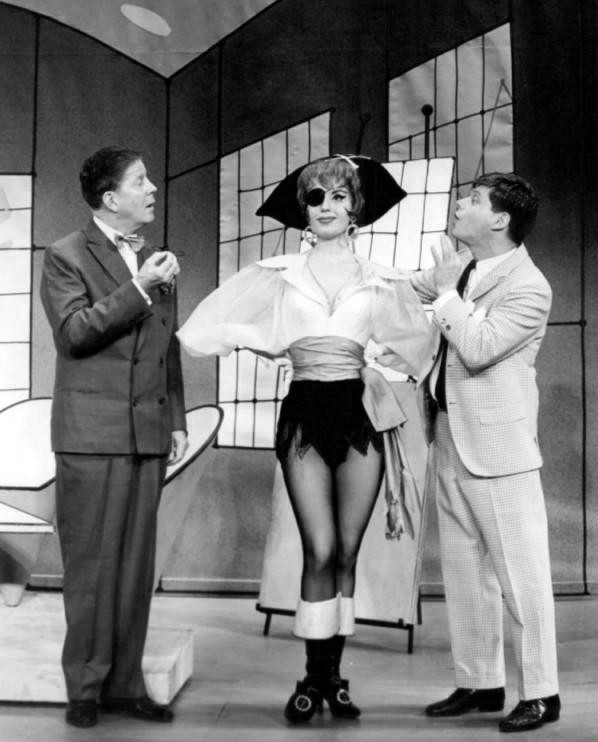
Vallee, Martin and Morse on stage, 1961.

The book warns Finch that because vice-president of advertising is a bad position, he needs a brilliant idea. Bud Frump slyly tells Finch his idea for a treasure hunt, which Finch loves, unaware that Biggley has already heard the idea and rejected it. Finch shares the idea with Rosemary, who tells him that she'll stay with him no matter what happens ("Happy To Keep His Dinner Warm (Reprise)"). Hedy tells Biggley that she is unhappy as a secretary and is leaving for California. He begs her to stay and tells her he loves her, and she agrees to stay ("Love From a Heart of Gold"). In the executive washroom, Finch gives himself a pep talk while, behind his back, the other executives and Frump plot against him ("I Believe In You").

Finch presents "his" idea to Biggley: he will hide five thousand shares of company stock in each of the ten offices around the country and give a television audience weekly clues as to their whereabouts. Biggley accepts this idea when Finch explains that each clue will be given by the scantily-dressed World Wide Wicket Treasure Girl: Miss Hedy LaRue.

During the first television show, Hedy is asked to swear on a Bible that she doesn't know the location of the prizes. Hedy panics and reveals the locations to the entire television audience, which prompts all the Wicket employees to tear apart the offices looking for them. The book tells Finch, "How To Handle a Disaster. ...We suggest that your best bet if you are the cause of the Disaster is to review the first chapter of this book: 'How to Apply for a Job'."

The executives, including Chairman of the Board Wally Womper, are waiting in Biggley's office for Finch's resignation. Rosemary again tells Finch that she'll stand by him no matter what ("I Believe in You (Reprise)"). About to sign his letter of resignation, Finch mentions that he'll probably go back to washing windows. Womper is drawn to Finch as he, too, was a window washer and they both "had a book": Wally's book was a book of betting records. Finch blames the treasure hunt on Frump, also mentioning that Frump is Biggley's nephew. Womper is about to "clean house from top to bottom", when Finch steps in on everyone's behalf. Finch tells the executives that even though the business world is a place filled with betrayal and competitiveness, the World Wide Wicket staff is like a family to him ("Brotherhood of Man"). Everyone is spared except Frump, who is fired because he is Biggley's nephew.

Biggley remains president, Womper retires to travel the world with his new wife, Hedy, and Finch becomes chairman of the board. Rosemary stands by his side and inadvertently inspires him to aspire for the Presidency of the United States. Frump gets a job washing windows, swearing revenge against Finch ("Company Way (Finale)").

== Characters ==
Major Characters

- J. Pierrepont Finch – a window washer who applies for a job at the World Wide Wicket Company
- Rosemary Pilkington – a secretary at the World Wide Wicket Company who instantly falls in love with Finch
- J. B. Biggley – the CEO of the World Wide Wicket Company
- Bud Frump – Biggley's arrogant and lazy nephew
- Hedy LaRue – Biggley's attractive and dim-witted mistress

Supporting Characters

- Miss Jones – Biggley's immovable secretary who is charmed by Finch
- Book Voice – the "voice" of the book How to Succeed in Business Without Really Trying, which narrates the musical
- Mr. Bert Bratt – personnel manager
- Mr. Twimble – head of the mail room for 25 years; finally gets promoted to the shipping department
- Smitty – Rosemary's best friend and fellow secretary at the World Wide Wicket Company
- Mr. Milton Gatch – head of the Plans and Systems department
- Miss Krumholtz – a secretary of Mr. Gatch, then of Finch
- Mr. Benjamin Burton Daniel Ovington – head of the advertising department until Finch reveals that he has graduated from Biggley's college's arch-rival; he is often referred to in the show by his initials, "BBDO"
- Mr. Wally Womper – the chairman of the World Wide Wicket Company; he is traditionally played by the same actor as Twimble
- Executives and Secretaries – chorus

== Musical numbers ==
Act I

- "Overture"
- "How to Succeed" – Finch and Ensemble
- "Happy to Keep His Dinner Warm" – Rosemary
- "Coffee Break" – Bud Frump, Smitty, Ensemble
- "Company Way" – Twimble, Finch
- "Company Way (Reprise)" – Bud, Twimble, Ensemble
- "A Secretary Is Not a Toy" – Bratt, Ensemble
- "Been a Long Day" – Smitty, Finch, and Rosemary
- "Been a Long Day (Reprise)" – Bud, Biggley, Hedy
- "Grand Old Ivy" – Finch, Biggley
- "Paris Original" – Rosemary, Smitty, Krumholtz, Miss Jones, and Girls
- "Rosemary" – Finch, Rosemary
- "Act I Finale" – Finch, Rosemary, Bud

Act II

- "Cinderella, Darling" – Smitty and Girls
  - 1995 revival replacement: "How to Succeed (Reprise)"
- "Happy to Keep His Dinner Warm (Reprise)" – Rosemary
- "Love From a Heart of Gold" – Biggley, Hedy
- "I Believe in You" – Finch, Men
- "I Believe in You (Reprise)" – Rosemary
- "Brotherhood of Man" – Finch, Womper, Miss Jones, and Men
- "Company Way (Finale)" – Company

== Productions ==
=== Broadway (1961–1965) ===
The show opened on Broadway on October 14, 1961, at the 46th Street Theatre, and closed on March 6, 1965, after 1,417 performances. The cast starred Robert Morse as Finch, Bonnie Scott as his secretary Rosemary, Charles Nelson Reilly as Bud Frump, and Rudy Vallée as J. B. Biggley. Virginia Martin played Hedy LaRue.

=== West End (1963–1964) ===
The West End production opened at the Shaftesbury Theatre on March 28, 1963, and ran for 520 performances. It was also directed by Burrows and Bob Fosse, and featured a new London cast. Warren Berlinger and Billy De Wolfe starred as Finch and Biggley respectively, with Patricia Michael as Rosemary, Josephine Blake as Smitty, David Knight as Bud Frump, Olive Lucius as Miss Jones, Bernard Spear as Mr. Twimble, and Eileen Gourlay as Hedy LaRue.

=== Australia ===
The Australian production presented by J. C. Williamson's opened at Her Majesty's Theatre, Melbourne on August 16, 1963. Len Gochman starred as Finch, with Betty McGuire as Hedy, and Annabelle Adams as Rosemary. The show toured across Australia, playing seasons in Sydney, Perth, and Adelaide. Nancye Hayes, who started in the ensemble, would later go on to replace Betty McGuire as Hedy.

=== Broadway revival (1995–1996) ===
A Broadway revival opened at the 46th Street Theatre (by then renamed the Richard Rodgers Theatre) on March 23, 1995, and closed on July 14, 1996, after 548 performances. It was directed by Des McAnuff, choreographed by Wayne Cilento, with musical direction by Ted Sperling. Matthew Broderick starred as Finch and Rosemary was played by Megan Mullally. The cast also included Ronn Carroll as J. B. Biggley, Victoria Clark as Smitty, Jeff Blumenkrantz as Bud Frump, and, in a pre-recorded performance, Walter Cronkite as the Book Voice. The replacements for Mullally and Broderick were Broderick's future wife Sarah Jessica Parker as Rosemary and John Stamos as Finch. Ralph Macchio was offered the role of Finch when Broderick left the show, but opted to take the role in the touring cast instead. Broderick made a brief return to the show so he could star opposite Parker. Robert Mandan played Biggley in its California pre-Broadway run but chose not to transfer to New York.

The wardrobe was designed by Susan Hilferty and is on display at the Costume World Broadway Collection in Pompano Beach, Florida.

=== US national tour (1996–1997) ===
A national tour of How To Succeed ran beginning in Baltimore in May 1996 and ended in Milwaukee in June 1997. Other stops included Sacramento, Portland, and Seattle. The national tour cast featured Ralph Macchio as J. Pierrepont Finch, Shauna Hicks (Rosemary Pilkington), Richard Thomsen (J. B. Biggley), Pamela Blair (Hedy LaRue), and Roger Bart (Bud Frump). Both Macchio and the production played to favorable reviews.

=== Broadway revival (2011–2012) ===
Daniel Radcliffe was featured in a reading in December 2009, with Rob Ashford as director and choreographer. Radcliffe starred in the revival for ten months, which began previews at the Al Hirschfeld Theatre on February 26, 2011, with the official opening on March 27, 2011. Rob Ashford directed and choreographed. Other cast included John Larroquette as J. B. Biggley, Rose Hemingway as Rosemary Pilkington, Mary Faber as Smitty, Tammy Blanchard as Hedy La Rue, and Christopher Hanke as Bud Frump. Anderson Cooper recorded the Voice of the Book for the production. The production was nominated for nine 2011 Tony Awards, including for director-choreographer Rob Ashford and as Best Revival of a Musical. John Larroquette won the Tony Award for Best Featured Actor in a Musical.

Darren Criss succeeded Radcliffe in the role of J. Pierrepont Finch for a limited, three-week engagement January 3–22, 2012. Criss was awarded the Broadway.com Audience Choice Award for Favorite Replacement for his performance in this role. Beau Bridges replaced John Larroquette as J. B. Biggley starting January 3, 2012. Nick Jonas took over the role of Finch on January 24, 2012. Jonas was nominated for a 2012 Broadway Beacon Award for his performance in this role. Michael Urie replaced Christopher Hanke in the role of Bud Frump starting on January 24, 2012.

The production closed on May 20, 2012, after 30 previews and 473 regular performances. A cast recording was released by Decca Broadway on June 7, 2011.

=== Off-West End revival (2023) ===
An off-West End gender-fluid revival of the show ran from May to June 2023 at the Southwark Playhouse (Borough) in London. It included Olivier winner Tracie Bennett in the role of J. B. Biggley and featured Michelle Visage as the voice of "the book".

== Cast lists ==
Character	Broadway	West End	First Broadway Revival	US National Tour	Second Broadway Revival	Off-West End Revival
Character	1961	1963	1995	1996	2011	2023
J. Pierrepont Finch	Robert Morse	Warren Berlinger	Matthew Broderick	Ralph Macchio	Daniel Radcliffe	Gabrielle Friedman
Rosemary Pilkington	Bonnie Scott	Patricia Michael	Megan Mullally	Shauna Hicks	Rose Hemingway	Allie Daniel
Bud Frump	Charles Nelson Reilly	David Knight	Jeff Blumenkrantz	Roger Bart	Christopher Hanke	Elliot Gooch
J. B. Biggley	Rudy Vallée	Billy De Wolfe	Ronn Carroll	Richard Thomsen	John Larroquette	Tracie Bennett
Smitty	Claudette Sutherland	Josephine Blake	Victoria Clark	Susann Fletcher	Mary Faber	Verity Power
Hedy LaRue	Virginia Martin	Eileen Gourlay	Luba Mason	Pamela Blair	Tammy Blanchard	Annie Aitken
Miss Jones	Ruth Kobart	Olive Lucius	Lillias White	Tina Fabrique	Ellen Harvey	Grace Kanyamibwa
Bert Bratt	Paul Reed	Robert Nichols	Jonathan Freeman	John Deyle	Michael Park	Taylor Bradshaw
Mr. Twimble/Wally Womper	Sammy Smith	Bernard Spear	Gerry Vichi	Michael Cone	Rob Bartlett	Danny Lane
Book Voice	Carl Princi (uncredited)	—N/a	Walter Cronkite	Walter Cronkite	Anderson Cooper	Michelle Visage

=== Notable replacements ===
==== First Broadway revival (1995–1996) ====
- J. Pierrepont Finch: John Bolton, Martin Moran, John Stamos
- Bud Frump: Brooks Ashmanskas
- Rosemary Pilkington: Sarah Jessica Parker
- Miss Jones: Adriane Lenox

==== Second Broadway revival (2011–2012) ====
- J. Pierrepont Finch: Darren Criss, Nick Jonas
- J.B. Biggley: Beau Bridges
- Rosemary Pilkington: Stephanie Rothenberg
- Bud Frump: Michael Urie

== Film adaptation ==
In 1967, United Artists released a film adapted and directed by David Swift. Robert Morse, Rudy Vallée, Michele Lee (who replaced Bonnie Scott as Rosemary during the show's Broadway run), Sammy Smith and Ruth Kobart recreated their roles for the film, and Fosse again choreographed. Several songs were omitted from the score, such as "Love From a Heart of Gold," "Happy to Keep His Dinner Warm," "Cinderella Darling," "Paris Original," and "Coffee Break", although there are musical and verbal references respectively to the last two. In the film's finale, Frump was among the entire company singing a finale version of "The Company Way."

== Television adaptation ==
The musical was adapted by Burrows for a television production starring Alan Bursky, Susan Blanchard and Larry Haines, directed by Burt Brinckerhoff. The production aired as an ABC Comedy Special on June 27, 1975.

== Critical reception ==
The original 1961 Broadway production opened to unanimously positive reviews, one of only eight musicals that opened on Broadway between 1943 and 1964 that did so. New York Times critic Howard Taubman wrote, "It stings mischievously and laughs uproariously...It belongs to the blue chips among modern musicals." Taubman praised the show's "adult viewpoint and consistency of style", stating that Burrows had "directed brilliantly" and that Loesser had "written lyrics with an edge and tunes with a grin...the songs sharpen the ridicule." Taubman stated Robert Morse played Finch "with unfailing bravura and wit", pronouncing Finch, as portrayed by Morse, "a rumpled, dimpled angel with a streak of Lucifer." John Chapman of the Daily News deemed it "the definitive musical about high life in the city" with "perfect musical comedy construction." Chapman declared that "Loesser is the perfect man for his end of the show - the songs; for he is a cynic without being tough. He has not put in a note of music or a syllable of lyric that doesn't carry the story along." Richard Watts Jr. of the New York Post wrote, "In its first performance at the 46th St. Theater Saturday night, its satire, humor, book, music, lyrics, cast, staging, choreography, setting and general gaiety of spirit combined in a smooth, fast pattern of expert showmanship to make the occasion a delightful event."

In the New York Herald Tribune, critic Walter Kerr stated, "Not a sincere line is spoken in the new Abe Burrows-Frank Loesser musical, and what a relief that is...How to Succeed is crafty, conniving, sneaky, cynical, irreverent, impertinent, sly, malicious, and lovely, just lovely." He opined that Burrows was most responsible for the musical's success, pronouncing, "What most distinguishes a sassy, gay, and exhilarating evening is--you'll never believe this--the book...Gags are subordinated to impish running commentary; Mr Loesser's perky score is subordinated to the merry malice that is afoot." John McClain of the New York Journal American declared it to be "The most inventive and stylized and altogether infectious new musical in recent recollection", pronouncing it "the sheerest farce..gay, zingy, amoral, witty and shot with style. It comes very close to being a new form in musicals." He praised Loesser's score, saying, "All the music has been integrated into the plot, to fit the mood as well as the momentum. His lyrics are generally superb." McClain particularly noted Bob Fosse's choreography, saying that his dances were "a whole new chapter in ingenuity." Norman Nadel of the New York World-Telegram and Sun declared, "Whichever white winged angel watches over theatrical enterprises was sitting on top of the 46th St. Theatre Saturday night, joyously blasting away on a solid gold trumpet."

In contrast, in their reviews of the 2011 Broadway revival, the New York Times chief theater critic Ben Brantley warns that the show's book writers "failed to give Ponty any defining traits beyond all-consuming ambition" and that "you don’t particularly want [Daniel Radcliffe's] character in the show to succeed, and that really is a problem." Charles McNulty of the Los Angeles Times opined that the musical "is hampered by a dated book" and that its "episodic structure now seems as belabored as a sitcom plucked from a rusty time capsule", while "all the romantic brouhaha with moony secretaries is beyond retro."

== Recordings ==
- 1961: How to Succeed in Business Without Really Trying (original Broadway cast recording)
- 2011: How to Succeed in Business Without Really Trying: Soundtrack from the Musical Comedy

== Awards and honors ==
The show was the second musical in three years to win the top three theatre awards - Tony, the New York Drama Critics Circle award, and the Pulitzer Prize - following the success of Fiorello!. It was only the fourth musical to win the Pulitzer after Of Thee I Sing (1932), South Pacific (1950) and Fiorello!.

=== Original Broadway production ===
Year	Award	Category	Nominee	Result
1961	Grammy Award	Best Musical Theatre Album	Frank Loesser	Won
1962	Tony Award	Best Musical		Won
1962	Tony Award	Best Author	Abe Burrows, Jack Weinstock and Willie Gilbert	Won
1962	Tony Award	Best Actor in a Musical	Robert Morse	Won
1962	Tony Award	Best Featured Actor in a Musical	Charles Nelson Reilly	Won
1962	Tony Award	Best Direction of a Musical	Abe Burrows	Won
1962	Tony Award	Best Producer	Cy Feuer and Ernest Martin	Won
1962	Tony Award	Best Composer	Frank Loesser	Nominated
1962	Tony Award	Best Conductor and Musical Director	Elliot Lawrence	Won
1962	New York Drama Critics' Circle Awards	Best Musical	Frank Loesser, Abe Burrows, Willie Gilbert and Jack Weinstock	Won

=== 1995 Broadway revival ===
Year	Award	Category	Nominee	Result
1995	Tony Award	Best Revival of a Musical		Nominated
1995	Tony Award	Best Actor in a Musical	Matthew Broderick	Won
1995	Tony Award	Best Direction of a Musical	Des McAnuff	Nominated
1995	Tony Award	Best Choreography	Wayne Cilento	Nominated
1995	Drama Desk Awards	Outstanding Musical		Nominated
1995	Drama Desk Awards	Outstanding Actor in a Musical	Matthew Broderick	Nominated

=== 2011 Broadway revival ===
Year	Award	Category	Nominee	Result
2011	Tony Award	Best Revival of a Musical		Nominated
2011	Tony Award	Best Featured Actor in a Musical	John Larroquette	Won
2011	Tony Award	Best Performance by a Featured Actress in a Musical	Tammy Blanchard	Nominated
2011	Tony Award	Best Direction of a Musical	Rob Ashford	Nominated
2011	Tony Award	Best Choreography	Rob Ashford	Nominated
2011	Tony Award	Best Orchestrations	Doug Besterman	Nominated
2011	Tony Award	Best Costume Design	Catherine Zuber	Nominated
2011	Tony Award	Best Lighting Design	Howell Binkley	Nominated
2011	Drama Desk Award	Outstanding Revival of a Musical		Nominated
2011	Drama Desk Award	Outstanding Actor in a Musical	Daniel Radcliffe	Nominated
2011	Drama Desk Award	Outstanding Featured Actor in a Musical	John Larroquette	Won
2011	Drama Desk Award	Outstanding Director of a Musical	Rob Ashford	Nominated
2011	Drama Desk Award	Outstanding Choreography	Rob Ashford	Nominated
2012	Grammy Award	Best Musical Theater Album	John Larroquette & Daniel Radcliffe, artists; Robert Sher, producer; Frank Loesser, composer/lyricist	Nominated
