= Rob Ashford =

American stage director and choreographer

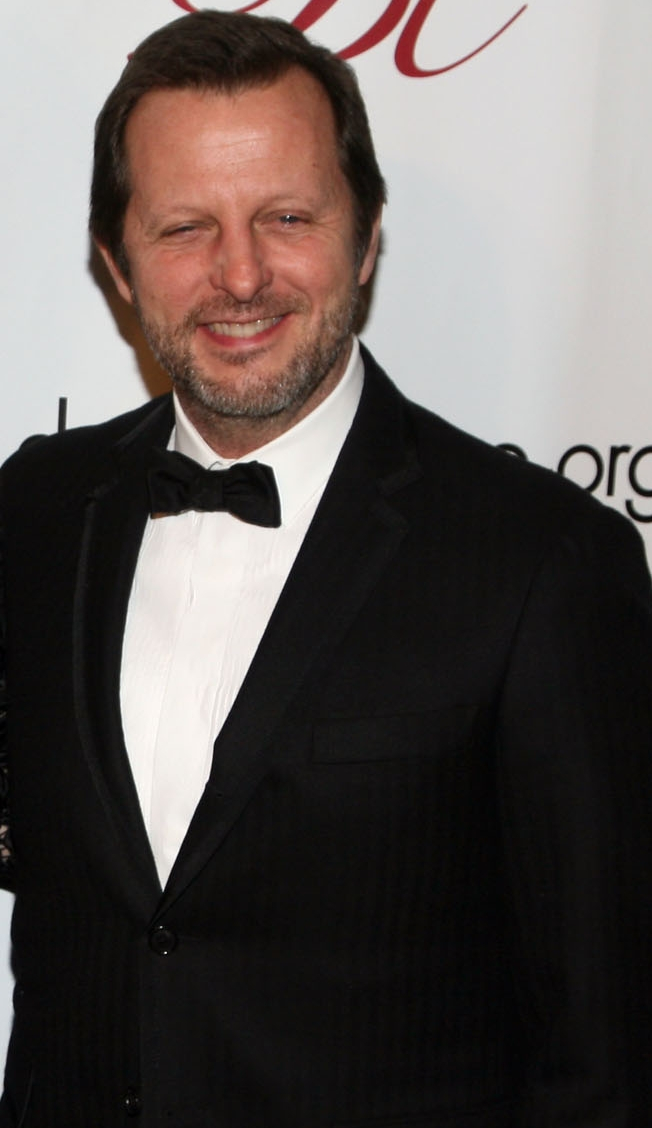
- Ashford in 2012
- Born: November 19, 1959 (age 66); Orlando, Florida, US
- Education: Washington and Lee University; Point Park University
- Occupations: Director; choreographer
- Years active: 1987–present

Rob Ashford (born November 19, 1959) is an American stage director and choreographer. He is a Tony Award, Olivier Award, Emmy Award, Drama Desk Award, and Outer Critics Circle Award winner.

== Early life and education ==
Born in Orlando, Florida and raised in Beckley, West Virginia, Ashford attended Washington and Lee University, Lexington, Virginia, in the pre-law program, graduating in 1982. He became interested in theatre with his work in the theatre department, and went on to study dance at Pittsburgh's Point Park University Conservatory of Performing Arts, graduating in 1983. He performed in the Pittsburgh theatre scene while in college, appearing with such companies as Pittsburgh Civic Light Opera. After graduation, Ashford moved to New York City, where he shared an apartment with friend and fellow choreographer Kathleen Marshall.

== Career ==
=== Broadway and Off-Broadway ===
As a dancer, Ashford made his Broadway debut in the 1987 Lincoln Center revival of Anything Goes starring Patti LuPone. Productions of The Most Happy Fella (1992), Crazy for You (1992), My Favorite Year (1992) (also Dance Captain), Victor/Victoria (1995) (also Dance Captain) and Parade (1998) (also Dance Captain and Assistant Choreographer) followed.

Ashford began working as a choreographer when Rob Marshall sent Ashford to re-stage Kiss of the Spider Woman in Buenos Aires. He next served as Associate Choreographer to Kathleen Marshall on the Broadway revival of Ring Round the Moon in 1999 the 1999 Broadway revival of Kiss Me, Kate, and Seussical in 2000.

Ashford won the 2002 Tony Award for Best Choreography for the Broadway musical Thoroughly Modern Millie (2002). Additional Broadway choreography credits include the Roundabout Theatre production of The Boys from Syracuse at the American Airlines Theatre in 2002, The Wedding Singer (2006) (Tony Nomination), Curtains (2007) (Tony Nomination), Cry-Baby (2008) (Tony Nomination) and Evita starring Ricky Martin (2012) (Tony Nomination).

He directed and choreographed Promises, Promises starring Sean Hayes and Kristin Chenoweth in 2010 (Tony Nomination for Best Choreography) and How to Succeed in Business Without Really Trying starring Daniel Radcliffe and John Laroquette in 2011, receiving Tony Nominations for Best Direction of a Musical and Best Choreography of a Musical. He also directed Scarlett Johansson in the 2012 revival of "Cat on a Hot Tin Roof" on Broadway.

For the New York City Center Encores! staged concert series, Ashford has choreographed: Tenderloin (2000), Bloomer Girl (2001), A Connecticut Yankee (2001), and Pardon My English (2004).

He directed and choreographed a 2010 pre-Broadway production of Leap of Faith at the Ahmanson Theater in Los Angeles.

In April 2015, Ashford directed and choreographed an acclaimed production of Carousel for the Lyric Opera of Chicago, starring Laura Osnes and Steven Pasquale. Ashford served as the choreographer of the musical Frozen.

Off-Broadway credits include Pardon My English (2004), The Thing About Men (2003), Bloomer Girl (2001), A Connecticut Yankee (2001), and Time and Again (2001).

=== London ===
In London, Ashford's directing credits include: Parade at the Donmar Warehouse (2007) (Olivier Nominations for Best Director and Best Theatre Choreographer) and A Streetcar Named Desire in 2009 at the Donmar Warehouse starring Rachel Weisz (Olivier nomination, Best Revival). He directed a revival of Anna Christie, starring Jude Law and Ruth Wilson at the Donmar Warehouse in 2011. This production won the Olivier Award for Best Revival. Ashford co-directed, with Jason Moore, the West End production of Shrek The Musical, which ran from 2011 to 2013 at the Theatre Royal Drury Lane. For the Manchester International Festival, Ashford directed Kenneth Branagh and Alex Kingston in Macbeth in 2013. The production transferred to the Park Ave Armory in New York City for a limited run in June 2014.

His choreography credits include Evita (2007 Olivier Nomination, Best Theatre Choreographer), Guys and Dolls at the Piccadilly Theatre starring Ewan McGregor and Jane Krakowski (2006 Olivier nomination for Best Theatre Choreographer), and Thoroughly Modern Millie at the Shaftesbury Theatre (2004 Olivier nomination for Best Theatre Choreographer). He directed and choreographed a musical version of the film Finding Neverland which premièred in autumn 2012 at Curve, Leicester.

Royal National Theatre choreography credits include A Funny Thing Happened on the Way to the Forum (2004) and Once in a Lifetime in 2005.

He directed and choreographed the new Gershwin musical A Damsel In Distress for Chichester Festival Theatre in 2015. In 2016, he co-directed The Winter's Tale with Branagh in a production that starred Branagh and Judi Dench, and he also directed Branagh in The Entertainer, for London's West End.

=== Film and television ===
Film credits include staging the musical numbers for the Bobby Darin biopic Beyond the Sea starring Kevin Spacey, Seth MacFarlane's A Million Ways to Die in the West and Ted 2, and the Disney film Cinderella directed by Kenneth Branagh.

For television, Ashford has choreographed tributes to Andrew Lloyd Webber, Barbra Streisand, Jerry Hermann, Meryl Streep, Barbara Cook, Shirley MacLaine, and Tom Hanks for The Kennedy Center Honors. He was the choreographer for the Kennedy Center Honors in 2007 and 2009, and also a co-producer for 2011, 2012 and 2014. He collaborated with filmmaker Baz Luhrmann on a production number featuring Hugh Jackman and Beyoncé Knowles for The 81st Annual Academy Awards, and won the 2009 Emmy Award for Outstanding Choreography. He also served as choreographer for the 85th Academy Awards (2013), 86th Academy Awards (2014), and the 87th Academy Awards (2015). In December 2013, Ashford was stage director and choreographer of NBC's live television presentation, The Sound of Music Live!, and received a DGA Award Nomination, and an Emmy Award nomination. Ashford then did the same for NBC's Peter Pan Live! in 2014, for which he received another DGA Award Nomination.

=== Other ===
Asford choreographed the opening number of the 2013 Tonys, "Make it Bigger". Ashford choreographed a new production of Candide at the Theatre du Chatelet (with subsequent productions at La Scala, Milan and The English National Opera). He directed The Barber of Seville for the Lyric Opera of Chicago, which began performances on February 1, 2014. He directed and choreographed Carmen at the Houston Grand Opera in April and May 2014.

Ashford is on the executive committee of The Society of Stage Directors and Choreographers, Board of Trustees of The Joyce Theater, Artists' Committee for the Kennedy Center Honors, and has been an associate director at The Old Vic since 2012.

In 2011, the New York Observer listed Ashford as number 42 on "The New Power Gays: NYC’s Top 50" list; Ashford was selected for Out magazine's "Out 100" in 2013.

=== Upcoming projects ===
In February 2019, it was announced that Ashford would direct a film adaptation of Andrew Lloyd Webber's stage musical Sunset Boulevard, starring Glenn Close reprising her on-stage role as Norma Desmond. However, in 2024, it was confirmed that Ashford had left the project due to delays in production caused by the COVID-19 pandemic and studio Paramount Pictures putting the project in turnaround. Ashford will direct the musical adaptation of Midnight in the Garden of Good and Evil in the summer of 2024.

== Credits (select) ==
=== Broadway ===
- Thoroughly Modern Millie (2002) (Tony Award)
- The Boys from Syracuse (2002)
- The Wedding Singer (2006) (Tony Award nomination, Drama Desk Award nomination)
- Curtains (2007) (Tony Award nomination)
- Cry-Baby (2008) (Tony Award nomination, Drama Desk Award winner (Outstanding Choreography), Fred and Adele Astaire Award, and Outer Critics Circle Award)
- Promises, Promises (2010) (Tony Award nomination for Choreography, Outer Critics Circle Award Nomination for Outstanding Choreographer)
- How to Succeed in Business Without Really Trying (Tony Award nomination, Drama Desk Award nominations (Outstanding Director of a Musical and Outstanding Choreography), Outer Critics Circle Award nomination, Astaire Award nomination) (2011)
- Evita (2012) (Tony Award nomination, Drama Desk Award nomination, Outer Critics Circle Award nomination, Astaire Award nomination)
- Cat on a Hot Tin Roof (2013)
- Frozen (2018)

=== London ===
- Thoroughly Modern Millie (2003) (Olivier Award nomination)
- Guys and Dolls (2005) (Olivier Award nomination)
- Evita (2006) (Olivier Award nomination)
- Parade (2008) (Olivier Award nominations for Direction and Choreography)
- A Funny Thing Happened on the Way to the Forum (Royal National Theatre)
- Once in a Lifetime (2005) (Royal National Theatre)
- Candide (2008) – new production at the English National Opera (With subsequent productions at La Scala, Milan and La Chatelet Theatre, Paris)
- A Streetcar Named Desire (2009, Donmar Warehouse) (Olivier Award nomination)
- Anna Christie (2011) (Olivier Award Best Revival)
