= John Larroquette =

American actor (born 1947)

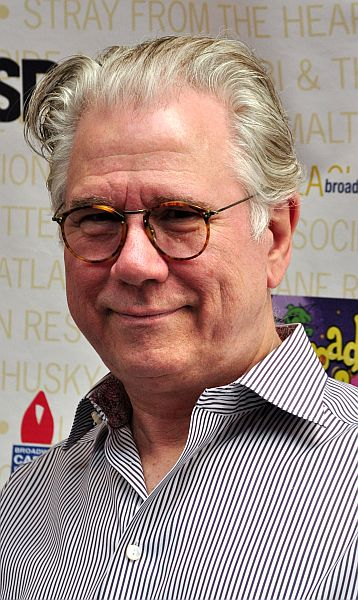
- Larroquette in 2011
- Born: John Bernard Larroquette; November 25, 1947 (age 78); New Orleans, Louisiana, U.S.
- Occupation: Actor
- Years active: 1974–present
- Notable credits: Night Court (1984–1992, 2023–2025); The John Larroquette Show (1993–1996); Boston Legal (2004–2008)
- Spouse: Elizabeth Cookson (m. 1975)
- Children: 3

John Bernard Larroquette (/ˌlærəˈkɛt/; born November 25, 1947) is an American actor. He is known for his starring roles in the NBC military drama series Baa Baa Black Sheep (1976–1978), the NBC sitcom Night Court (1984–1992; 2023–2025) for which he received four consecutive Primetime Emmy Awards wins for Outstanding Supporting Actor in a Comedy Series during the earlier incarnation, the NBC sitcom The John Larroquette Show (1993–1996), the David E. Kelley legal drama series The Practice (1997–2002), the ABC legal comedy-drama series Boston Legal (2004–2008), and the TNT series The Librarians (2014–2018).

In 2011, he made his Broadway debut in the musical revival of Frank Loesser's How to Succeed in Business Without Really Trying alongside Daniel Radcliffe. He played J. B. Bigley in a role for which he received a Tony Award for Best Featured Actor in a Musical, and a Drama Desk Award for Outstanding Featured Actor in a Musical. The following year he starred as William Russell in the Broadway revival of Gore Vidal's The Best Man (2012) directed by Mike Nichols starring James Earl Jones, Candice Bergen, and Angela Lansbury.

He made his film debut by providing the opening narration of the horror film The Texas Chain Saw Massacre (1974), following which he appeared in films such as Stripes (1981), Choose Me (1984), Blind Date (1987), Madhouse (1990), Richie Rich (1994), and the Hallmark Channel mystery series McBride (2005–2008).

== Early life ==
Larroquette was born in New Orleans, Louisiana, on November 25, 1947, the son of Berthalla Oramous, a department store clerk, and John Edgar Larroquette Jr., who was in the United States Navy. His paternal grandfather, John (Jean Edgar) Larroquette Sr., was born in France (1881) and emigrated to the United States in 1895.

Larroquette grew up in the Ninth Ward of New Orleans, near the French Quarter. He played clarinet and saxophone through childhood and into high school. He attended Holy Cross School through his sophomore year before involuntarily moving to Francis T. Nicholls High School to finish his secondary education. It was his senior year at Nicholls High School that he first discovered acting. He was offered a scholarship to Louisiana State University after winning a state high school speech title but decided not to attend the university. He served for a time in the United States Navy Reserve.

== Career ==
=== Early career ===
His first acting role in Hollywood was providing the opening voiceover narration for The Texas Chain Saw Massacre (1974). Larroquette did this as a favor for the film's director Tobe Hooper, and was paid in marijuana. His first series regular role was in the 1970s NBC program Baa Baa Black Sheep, where he portrayed a World War II United States Marine Corps fighter pilot, 2nd Lt. Bob Anderson.

In a 1975 appearance on Sanford and Son, Larroquette played Lamont's counterpart in a fictitious sitcom based on Fred and Lamont called "Steinberg and Son". During the filming of Stripes (1981), his nose was nearly cut off in an accident. He ran down a hall into a door that was supposed to open but did not, and his head went through the window in the door.

=== Night Court (1984–1992) ===
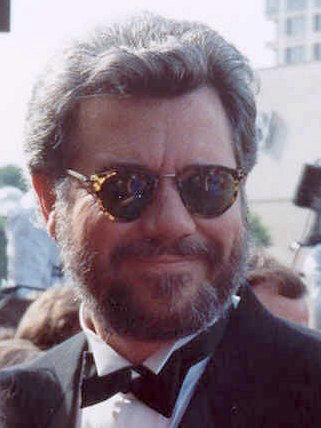
Larroquette attending the Emmy Awards in 1988

Larroquette played Assistant District Attorney Dan Fielding on Night Court; the character was initially rather conservative, but changed after the sitcom's creator Reinhold Weege came to learn more about Larroquette's sense of humor. The role won him Emmy Awards in 1985, 1986, 1987 and 1988. In 1989, he asked not to be considered for an Emmy Award. His four consecutive wins were, at the time, a record.

Night Court ran on NBC from 1984 until 1992. Larroquette, Harry Anderson (as Judge Harry Stone), and Richard Moll (as bailiff Bull Shannon) appeared in every episode of the series. There was talk a spin-off show revolving around Dan Fielding, but Larroquette rejected the idea. Later, Larroquette ended up on the 2023 series continuation as the only regular character from the original in the revival. On February 13, 2024, while talking to reporters, Larroquette admitted feeling a little sad when he first walked on the set of the Night Court revival, due to being one of the only living cast members from the original run. But as time went on, he started feeling better and credited co-star/executive producer Melissa Rauch for rejuvenating the franchise.

=== The John Larroquette Show ===
Instead of a spin-off, Larroquette and Don Reo developed a show revolving around some of Larroquette's own personal demons, particularly alcoholism. The John Larroquette Show, named by the insistence of NBC, starred Larroquette as the character John Hemingway. The show was lauded by critics, but failed to attract the prime-time audience, ranking around number 97 for most of the first season.

NBC threatened cancellation; however, Larroquette and Reo were granted the chance to retool the series, which saw it carry on for just over two more seasons, ending during its fourth season after 84 episodes, the last six of which were not aired. The show has a loyal cult following, although the series has never received an official home video release from Warner Bros.

=== Boston Legal and other television roles ===
In 1998, he guest-starred on three episodes of the legal drama The Practice. His portrayal of Joey Heric, a wealthy, wisecracking, narcissistic psychopath with a habit of stabbing his gay lovers to death, won him his fifth Emmy Award. He reprised the role for one episode in 2002, for which he was once again nominated for an Emmy Award. He also appeared in an episode of The West Wing as White House Counsel Lionel Tribbey.

In 2003, Larroquette reprised his narration for the remake of The Texas Chainsaw Massacre. From 2004 to 2006, he played the title role in the McBride series of ten Hallmark Mysteries television films. In 2007, he joined the cast of Boston Legal playing Carl Sack, a serious, ethical lawyer. He also guest-starred in the drama House where he played a previously catatonic father awakened to try to save his son.

From 2014 to 2018, Larroquette was a regular on The Librarians as Jenkins (actually the long-lived Camelot knight Sir Galahad), who provides support to the Librarians as a researcher and caretaker.

=== Film ===
His starring roles include the 1989 film Second Sight with Bronson Pinchot, and the 1990 film Madhouse with Kirstie Alley. Other films in which Larroquette had significant roles include: Stripes (1981), Blind Date (1987), Star Trek III: The Search for Spock (1984), Choose Me (1984), Meatballs Part II (1984), Summer Rental (1985), JFK (1991), and Richie Rich (1994).

=== Theatre ===
In 1975 he portrayed the lead role in the comedic play Tarboosh! at the Studio Playhouse in Los Angeles.

Larroquette made his musical stage debut in the Los Angeles production of How the Grinch Stole Christmas! as Old Max in 2009. He made his Broadway debut in the 2011 revival of How to Succeed in Business Without Really Trying as J B. Biggley alongside Daniel Radcliffe. He won the Tony Award for Best Featured Actor in a Musical and the Drama Desk Award for Outstanding Featured Actor in a Musical for his performance in the show.

He appeared on Broadway in a revival of Gore Vidal's The Best Man, starring James Earl Jones, Angela Lansbury, and Candice Bergen. In early 2019, he was back in New York City starring in the play Nantucket Sleigh Ride by John Guare, at the Lincoln Center Theatre. In this off-beat play, Larroquette portrayed the lead character, Edmund "Mundie" Gowery, for a three-month run.

== Personal life ==
Larroquette met his wife Elizabeth Ann Cookson in 1974 while working in the play Enter Laughing. They married on July 4, 1975, as that was the only day they had off from rehearsals. Cookson had a daughter, Lisa, from a previous relationship, and she and Larroquette would have two sons together, Jonathan and Benjamin. Jonathan co-hosts a comedy podcast called Uhh Yeah Dude.

Larroquette battled alcoholism from the mid-1970s to the early 1980s. On The Tonight Show with Jay Leno on March 10, 2007, he joked, "I was known to have a cocktail or sixty." He stopped drinking on February 6, 1982.

== Filmography ==
=== Film ===
Year	Title	Role	Notes
1966	Follow Me, Boys!	Lieutenant	Uncredited
1974	The Texas Chain Saw Massacre	Narrator	
1980	Altered States	X-Ray Technician	
1980	Heart Beat	TV Talk Show Host	
1981	Green Ice	Claude	
1981	Stripes	Captain Stillman	
1982	Cat People	Bronte Judson	
1983	Hysterical	Bob X. Cursion	
1983	Twilight Zone: The Movie	K.K.K. Member	
1984	Star Trek III: The Search for Spock	Maltz, a Klingon warrior	
1984	Choose Me	Billy Ace	
1984	Meatballs Part II	Lieutenant Felix Foxglove	
1985	Lifeforce	Narrator	
1985	Summer Rental	Don Moore	
1987	Blind Date	David Bedford	
1989	Second Sight	Wilbur Wills	
1990	Madhouse	Mark Bannister	
1990	Tune in Tomorrow	Dr. Albert Quince	
1991	JFK	Jerry Johnson	Director's cut
1994	Richie Rich	Lawrence Van Dough	
1995	Demon Knight	Slasher	Uncredited
2000	Isn't She Great	Maury Manning	
2003	The Texas Chainsaw Massacre	Narrator	
2003	Beethoven's 5th	Mayor Harold Herman	
2006	The Texas Chainsaw Massacre: The Beginning	Narrator	Uncredited
2006	Southland Tales	Vaughn Smallhouse	
2006	Kill Your Darlings	Dr. Bangley	
2007	The Rapture of the Athlete Assumed Into Heaven	The Reporter	Short film
2009	Green Lantern: First Flight	Tomar-Re	Voice
2010	Gun	Sam Boedecker	
2010	Sudden Death!	Commander Jenkins	Short film
2011	Inventors	Professor Morasco	Short film
2015	F.Y.D.	Frank Reese	Voice, short film
2016	Camera Store	Ray LaPine	
2020	Keep Hope Alive	Bernie Loewenstein	
2022	Texas Chainsaw Massacre	Narrator	

=== Television ===
Year	Title	Role	Notes
1975	Doctors' Hospital	Dr. Paul Herman	3 episodes
1975	Sanford and Son	Murray Steinberg	Episode: "Steinberg and Son"
1975	Kojak	Sailor	Episode: "How Cruel the Frost, How Bright the Stars"
1975	Ellery Queen	Bellhop	Episode: "The Adventure of the Pharaoh's Curse"
1976	Rich Man, Poor Man	Barone	Episode: "Part IV: Chapter 6"
1978	Greatest Heroes of the Bible	Currently Unknown	Episode: "Joseph in Egypt"
1976–1978	Baa Baa Black Sheep	2nd Lieutenant Bob Anderson	29 episodes
1979	Three's Company	Cop	Episode: "Jack Moves Out"
1979	Fantasy Island	Valery	Episode: "The Inventor/On the Other Side"
1979	The 416th	Lieutenant Jackson MacCalvey	Television film
1980	Stunts Unlimited	Leading Man	Television film
1981	Mork & Mindy	Baba Hope	Episode: "Alienation"
1982	Dallas	Phillip Colton	2 episodes
1982	Cassie & Co.	Currently Unknown	Episode: "Lover Come Back"
1982	Bare Essence	Arthur Williams	Television film
1982	9 to 5	Unknown	Episode: "Dick Doesn't Live Here Anymore"
1983	The Last Ninja	Army Officer	Television film
1984	Remington Steele	Nathan Fitts	Episode: "Breath of Steele"
1984–1992	Night Court	Reinhold Daniel Fielding Elmore	193 episodes
1986	Convicted	Douglas Forbes	Television film
1988	Hot Paint	Gus	Television film
1988	Saturday Night Live	Host	Episode: "John Larroquette/Randy Newman & Mark Knopfler"
1991	One Special Victory	Bo	Television film
1995	Dave's World	Dave's lawyer	Episode: "Health Hath No Fury"
1993–1996	The John Larroquette Show	John Hemingway	84 episodes
1997	The Defenders: Payback	Michael Lane	Television film
1997–2002	The Practice	Joey Heric	5 episodes
1999	Payne	Royal Payne	9 episodes
2000	The 10th Kingdom	Anthony 'Tony' Lewis	10 episodes
2000	The West Wing	Lionel Tribbey	Episode: "And It's Surely to Their Credit"
2001	Walter and Henry	Walter	Television film
2001	The Heart Department	Dr. Fred Biskin	Television film
2001	Till Dad Do Us Part	Gavin Corbett	Television film
2001	The Incurable Collector	Host	22 episodes
2002	Corsairs	Brandon Corsair	Television film
2003	Recipe for Disaster	Patrick Korda	Television film
2003–2004	Happy Family	Peter Brennan	22 episodes
2004	Wedding Daze	Jack Landry	Television film
2005–2008	McBride	Mike McBride	10 television films
2005	Kitchen Confidential	Chef Gerard	Episode: "Dinner Date with Death"
2005	Joey	Benjamin Lockwood	4 episodes
2006	Arrested Development	John Larroquette	Episode: "S.O.B.s"
2006	House	Gabriel Wozniak	Episode: "Son of Coma Guy"
2007–2008	The Batman	Mirror Master	Voice, 2 episodes
2007–2008	Boston Legal	Carl Sack	33 episodes
2008–2011	Chuck	Roan Montgomery	2 episodes
2009	Law & Order: Special Victims Unit	Randall Carver	Episode: "Anchor"
2009	The Storm	Bud McGrath	2 episodes
2009–2010	Phineas and Ferb	Bob Webber	Voice, 2 episodes
2010	Parks and Recreation	Frank Beckerson	Episode: "Galentine's Day"
2010	Pleading Guilty	Martin Gold	Television film
2010	White Collar	Donovan	Episode: "In the Red"
2010	CSI: NY	Chief Ted Carver	3 episodes
2010	15 Minutes	David Sloan	Television film
2011	Late Show with David Letterman	J.B. Biggley	Episode: "How to Succeed in Business Without Trying"
2012	Pound Puppies	Mayor	Voice, episode: "Squawk"
2013	Deception	Senator Dwight Haverstock	9 episodes
2014	Almost Human	Dr. Nigel Vaughn	Episode: "Unbound"
2014–2018	The Librarians	Jenkins	41 episodes
2015	The Brink	Robert Kittredge	7 episodes
2017–2018	Me, Myself & I	Older Alex Riley	13 episodes
2018	Murphy Brown	Judge Nate Campbell	Episode: "A Lifetime of Achievement"
2018	Three Rivers	Beau	Television film
2019	The Twilight Zone	President James Stevens	Episode: "The Wunderkind"
2019	Blood & Treasure	Jacob Whitman Reece III	5 episodes
2020	The Good Fight	Gavin Firth	6 episodes
2023–2025	Night Court	Dan Fielding	47 episodes
TBA	Bishop †	TBA	1 episode

Key
†	Denotes television productions that have not yet been released

=== Theatre ===
Year	Title	Role	Venue
2011	How to Succeed in Business Without Really Trying	J.B. Biggley	Al Hirschfeld Theatre, Broadway
2012	The Best Man	William Russell	Golden Theatre, Broadway
2016	1776	Benjamin Franklin	New York City Center, Encores!
2019	Nantucket Sleigh Ride, by John Guare	Edmund Gowery	Newhouse Theatre, Lincoln Center

== Awards and nominations ==
Award	Year	Category	Nominated work	Result	Ref.
American Comedy Awards	1990	Funniest Supporting Male in a Television Series	Night Court	Nominated	
Drama Desk Awards	2011	Outstanding Featured Actor in a Musical	How to Succeed in Business Without Really Trying	Won	
Golden Globe Awards	1987	Best Supporting Actor – Television	Night Court	Nominated	
Primetime Emmy Awards	1985	Outstanding Supporting Actor in a Comedy Series	Night Court	Won	
Primetime Emmy Awards	1986	Outstanding Supporting Actor in a Comedy Series	Night Court	Won	
Primetime Emmy Awards	1987	Outstanding Supporting Actor in a Comedy Series	Night Court	Won	
Primetime Emmy Awards	1988	Outstanding Supporting Actor in a Comedy Series	Night Court	Won	
Primetime Emmy Awards	1994	Outstanding Lead Actor in a Comedy Series	The John Larroquette Show	Nominated	
Primetime Emmy Awards	1998	Outstanding Guest Actor in a Drama Series	The Practice	Won	
Primetime Emmy Awards	2002	Outstanding Guest Actor in a Drama Series	The Practice	Nominated	
Saturn Awards	2015	Best Guest Starring Role on Television	The Librarians	Nominated	
Screen Actors Guild Awards	2007	Outstanding Ensemble in a Drama Series	Boston Legal	Nominated	
Screen Actors Guild Awards	2008	Outstanding Ensemble in a Drama Series	Boston Legal	Nominated	
Tony Awards	2011	Best Featured Actor in a Musical	How to Succeed in Business Without Really Trying	Won	
Viewers for Quality Television	1994	Best Actor in a Quality Comedy Series	The John Larroquette Show	Nominated	
Viewers for Quality Television	1995	Best Actor in a Quality Comedy Series	The John Larroquette Show	Nominated	
Viewers for Quality Television	1998	Best Recurring Player	The Practice	Won	
