= Alesso discography =

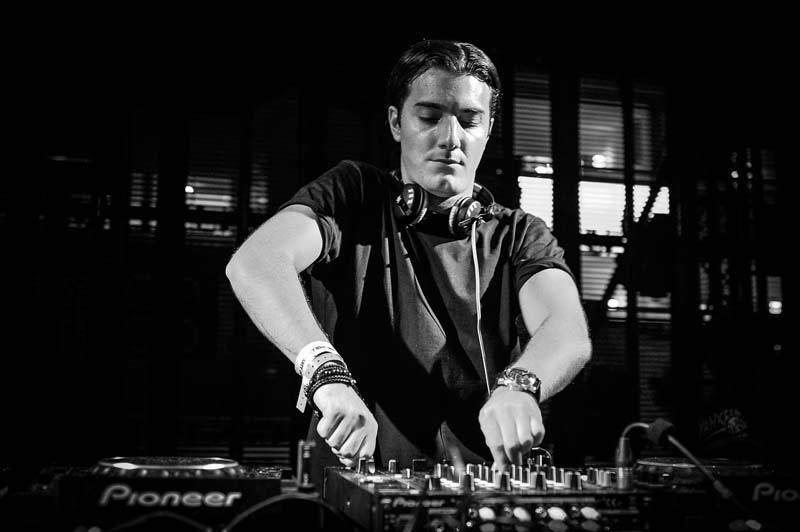
- Alesso live at Ushuaia, Ibiza
- Studio albums: 1
- Singles: 53
- Mixtapes: 2
- Remixes: 18

This is the discography of Swedish DJ and record producer Alesso.

== Studio albums ==
List of studio albums, with selected chart positions and certifications
Title	Details	Peak chart positions								Certifications
Title	Details	SWE	AUS	AUT	BEL	NLD	SWI	UK	US	Certifications
Forever	Released: 22 May 2015; Label: Def Jam; Formats: CD, digital download	4	41	69	43	54	42	24	30	GLF: Gold; BPI: Gold; RIAA: Gold

== Mixtapes ==
List of mixtapes
Title	Album details
Progresso Volume 1	Released: 8 March 2019; Label: 10:22PM; Formats: Digital download
Progresso Vol. 2	Released: 4 June 2021; Label: 10:22PM; Formats: Digital download

== EPs ==
List of mixtapes
Title	EP details
Hypnotize	Released: 10 May 2024; Label: BodyHi; Formats: Digital download
The One	Released: 21 August 2026; Label: BodyHi, Tomorrowland Music; Formats: Digital download

== Singles ==
List of singles as lead artist, with selected chart positions and certifications, showing year released and album name
Title	Year	Peak chart positions											Certifications	Album
Title	Year	SWE	AUS	BEL	AUT	CAN	DEN	GER	ITA	SWI	UK	US	Certifications	Album
"Raise Your Head"	2011	—	—	—	—	—	—	—	—	—	—	—		Non-album single
"Calling (Lose My Mind)" (with Sebastian Ingrosso featuring Ryan Tedder)	2012	18	—	—	—	—	—	—	—	71	19	—	GLF: 3× Platinum; ARIA: Gold; BPI: Silver; FIMI: Gold; IFPI DEN: Gold; MC: Gold; RIAA: Gold	Until Now
"Years" (featuring Matthew Koma)	2012	24	—	—	—	—	—	86	—	—	109	—	GLF: 2× Platinum	Forever
"If I Lose Myself" (vs. OneRepublic)	2013	4	14	—	—	—	—	—	—	—	8	—	GLF: 4× Platinum; BPI: Platinum	Forever and Native
"City of Dreams" (with Dirty South featuring Ruben Haze)	2013	—	—	—	—	—	—	—	—	—	—	—		Non-album single
"Under Control" (with Calvin Harris featuring Hurts)	2013	8	17	42	21	82	28	24	—	34	1	― (Note: "Under Control" did not enter the Billboard Hot 100, but peaked at number three on the Bubbling Under Hot 100 chart.)	GLF: 2× Platinum; ARIA: 2× Platinum; BPI: Platinum; BVMI: Gold; FIMI: Platinum; IFPI DEN: Platinum; IFPI SWI: Gold; RIAA: Platinum	Forever and Motion
"Tear the Roof Up"	2014	—	—	—	—	—	—	—	—	—	—	—		Forever
"Heroes (We Could Be)" (featuring Tove Lo)	2014	5	11	28	41	51	26	71	—	47	6	31	GLF: 4× Platinum; ARIA: Platinum; BPI: 2× Platinum; BVMI: Gold; FIMI: Platinum; IFPI DEN: Platinum; MC: Gold; RIAA: 2× Platinum	Forever
"Cool" (featuring Roy English)	2015	59	—	19	—	—	—	—	—	—	10	—	GLF: Platinum; BPI: Silver	Forever
"Sweet Escape" (featuring Sirena)	2015	87	—	2	—	—	—	—	—	—	189	—		Forever
"This Summer" (vs. Maroon 5)	2015	52	—	—	—	—	—	—	—	—	—	—	ARIA: Gold	Non-album singles
"Anthem"	2016	—	—	—	—	—	—	—	—	—	—	—		Non-album singles
"I Wanna Know" (featuring Nico & Vinz or Jolin Tsai)	2016	25	—	—	—	—	—	—	—	—	142	—	GLF: 2× Platinum; FIMI: Platinum	Non-album singles
"Take My Breath Away"	2016	56	—	25	—	—	—	—	—	—	—	—		Non-album singles
"Falling"	2017	50	—	—	—	—	—	—	—	—	72	—		Non-album singles
"Move Like That"	2017	―	―	—	―	―	―	―	―	―	―	―		Non-album singles
"Let Me Go" (with Hailee Steinfeld featuring Florida Georgia Line and Watt)	2017	35	12	—	52	18	―	78	—	60	30	40	GLF: 2× Platinum; ARIA: 5× Platinum; BPI: Platinum; BVMI: Gold; FIMI: Platinum; IFPI DEN: Gold; MC: 4× Platinum; RIAA: Platinum	Non-album singles
"Is That for Me" (with Anitta)	2017	―	―	—	―	—	―	―	―	―	―	―		Non-album singles
"Remedy"	2018	30	—	—	―	—	―	―	—	―	―	―	GLF: Platinum; FIMI: Gold; IFPI DEN: Gold; RIAA: Gold	Non-album singles
"Tilted Towers"	2018	―	―	—	―	—	―	―	―	―	―	―		Ninjawerks: Vol. 1
"Sad Song" (featuring Tini)	2019	88	―	—	―	—	―	―	―	―	―	―		Non-album singles
"In the Middle" (with Sumr Camp)	2019	―	―	—	―	—	―	―	―	―	―	―		Non-album singles
"One Last Time" (with DubVision)	2020	―	―	—	―	—	―	―	―	―	―	―		Non-album singles
"Midnight" (featuring Liam Payne)	2020	60	―	2	―	—	―	―	―	97	―	―	MC: Gold	LP1
"The End" (with Charlotte Lawrence)	2020	―	―	—	―	—	―	―	―	―	―	―		Non-album singles
"Leave a Little Love" (with Armin van Buuren)	2021	―	―	26	―	—	―	―	—	―	―	―		Non-album singles
"Going Dumb" (with Corsak and Stray Kids)	2021	63	―	—	―	—	―	―	―	―	―	―		Non-album singles
"Chasing Stars" (with Marshmello featuring James Bay)	2021	74	―	40	―	—	―	―	―	―	―	―		Non-album singles
"When I'm Gone" (with Katy Perry)	2021	91	96	25	―	54	―	88	―	―	49	90	BPI: Silver; FIMI: Gold; RIAA: Gold	Non-album singles
"Somebody to Use"	2021	―	―	—	—	―	―	―	―	―	―	―		Non-album singles
"Dark"	2022	―	―	—	—	―	―	―	―	―	―	―		Non-album singles
"Only You" (with Sentinel)	2022	―	―	—	—	―	―	―	―	―	―	―		Non-album singles
"Words" (featuring Zara Larsson)	2022	5	―	11	—	―	―	―	―	―	36	—	IFPI DEN: Gold; BPI: Gold	Non-album singles
"In My Feelings" (with Deniz Koyu)	2022	―	―	—	—	―	―	―	―	―	―	―		Non-album singles
"We Go Out" (with Sick Individuals)	2022	―	―	—	—	―	―	―	―	―	―	―		Non-album singles
"Caught a Body" (with Ty Dolla Sign)	2023	―	―	—	—	―	―	―	―	―	―	―		Non-album singles
"Without You"	2023	―	―	—	—	―	―	―	―	―	―	―		Non-album singles
"Call Your Name" (with John Newman)	2023	―	―	—	—	―	―	―	―	―	―	―		Non-album singles
"Free" (with Dillon Francis and Clementine Douglas)	2023	―	―	—	—	―	―	―	―	―	―	―		Non-album singles
"Zig Zag"	2024	―	―	—	—	―	―	―	―	―	―	―		Hypnotize
"I Like It" (with Nate Smith)	2024	―	―	24	—	60	―	―	―	―	―	―		Non-album singles
"Never Going Home Tonight" (with David Guetta featuring Madison Love)	2024	― (Note: "Never Going Home Tonight" did not enter the Swedish Singellista Chart, but peaked at number seven on the Swedish Heatseeker Chart.)	―	—	15	—	―	―	―	77	―	―		Non-album singles
"Lonely Heart" (featuring John Alto)	2024	―	―	—	—	—	―	―	―	―	―	―		Non-album singles
"Surrender" (with Becky Hill)	2025	―	―	42	—	―	―	―	―	―	―	―		Non-album singles
"Freedom" (with Sentinel)	2025	―	―	—	—	―	―	―	―	―	―	―		Non-album singles
"Inside Our Hearts" (with Martin Garrix featuring Shaun Farrugia)	2025	―	―	—	—	―	―	―	―	―	―	―		Origo
"Upside Down" (with Sentinel and Sick Individuals)	2025	―	―	—	—	―	―	―	―	―	―	―		Non-album singles
"Destiny" (with Sacha)	2025	―	―	31	—	―	―	―	―	―	―	―		Non-album singles
"Fade" (with Pendulum)	2026	—	—	—	—	—	—	—	—	—	—	—		TBA
"Years" (with Symphony of Unity)	2026	—	—	—	—	—	—	—	—	—	—	—		TBA
"Turn Up the Bass" (featuring Joa and Tyree Cooper)	2026	—	—	—	—	—	—	—	—	—	—	—		TBA
"In Your Eyes" (with OneRepublic)	2026	—	—	—	—	—	—	—	—	—	—	—		TBA
"Fight for Love" (with Kaitlin Aragon)	2026	—	—	—	—	—	—	—	—	—	—	—		TBA
"—" denotes a recording that did not chart or was not released in that territory.

== Music videos ==
Video	Year	Director
"Years" (featuring Matthew Koma)	2012	Henrik Hanson
"Tear the Roof Up"	2014	Drew Cox
"Heroes (We Could Be)" (featuring Tove Lo)	2014	Emil Nava
"Cool" (featuring Roy English)	2015	Emil Nava
"Sweet Escape" (featuring Sirena)	2015	MIE
"I Wanna Know" (featuring Nico & Vinz)	2016	Colin Tilley
"Falling"	2017	Henrik Hanson
"Is That for Me" (with Anitta)	2017	Manuel Nogueira
"Remedy"	2018	Rudy Mancuso
"Time"	2019	Brennan Karem
"Progresso"	2019	Brennan Karem
"When I'm Gone" (with Katy Perry)	2022	Hannah Lux Davis

== Remixes ==
2010

- Tim Berg – "Alcoholic" (Alesso Taking It Back Remix)
- Deniz Koyu featuring Shena – "Time of Our Lives" (Alesso Remix)

2011

- Therese – "Drop It Like It's Hot" (Alesso Remix)
- Dúné – "Heiress of Valentina" (Alesso Remix)
- Erik Holmberg and Niko Bellotto featuring JB – "Running Up That Hill" (Alesso Remix)
- Nadia Ali, Starkillers and Alex Kenji – "Pressure" (Alesso Remix)
- Swedish House Mafia – "Save the World" (Alesso Remix)
- DEVolution – "Good Love" (Alesso Remix)
- LMFAO featuring Lauren Bennett and GoonRock – "Party Rock Anthem" (Alesso Remix)
- David Guetta featuring Sia – "Titanium" (Alesso Remix)
- Jasper Forks – "River Flows In You" (Alesso Remix)

2012

- Arty – "When I See You" (Alesso Mix)
- Keane – "Silenced by the Night" (Alesso Remix)

2013

- OneRepublic vs. Alesso – "If I Lose Myself" (Alesso Remix)

2015

- Maroon 5 vs. Alesso – "This Summer" (Alesso Remix)

2016

- Alesso – "I Wanna Know" (Alesso and Deniz Koyu Remix)
- Jolin Tsai – "Play" (Alesso Remix)

2017

- The Chainsmokers and Coldplay – "Something Just Like This" (Alesso Remix)
- J Balvin and Willy William – "Mi Gente" (Alesso Remix)

2019

- Alesso – "Time" (Alesso and Deniz Koyu Remix)
- Alesso featuring Tini – "Sad Song" (Alesso Remix)

2020

- Alesso featuring Liam Payne – "Midnight" (Alesso and Esh Remix)

2021

- Alesso and Marshmello featuring James Bay – "Chasing Stars" (VIP Mix)
- Alesso – "Somebody To Use" (Toxic Mix)

2022

- Alesso and Katy Perry – "When I'm Gone" (VIP Mix)
- Alesso featuring Zara Larsson – "Words" (Alesso VIP Mix)

== Productions ==
Title	Credited artist(s)	Year	Album
"Numb"	Usher	2012	Looking 4 Myself
"Queen of Your Dreams"	Example	2012	The Evolution of Man
"Tension"	Fergie	2017	Double Dutchess
"Anywhere"	Rita Ora	2017	Phoenix
"Leave Before You Love Me"	Marshmello, Jonas Brothers	2021	Non-album single
