= Take My Breath Away (disambiguation) =

"Take My Breath Away" is a 1986 song by Berlin written for the film Top Gun, also covered by Jessica Simpson.

Take My Breath Away may also refer to:

- "Take My Breath Away" (Alesso song), 2016
- "Take My Breath Away" (Emma Bunton song), 2001
- "Take My Breath Away" (Margo Smith song), 1976
- Take My Breath Away (album), a 2009 album by Gui Boratto
- "Take My Breath Away", an episode of Degrassi: The Next Generation

== See also ==
- "Take My Breath", a 2021 song by the Weeknd
- You Take My Breath Away (disambiguation)
