= The Sweet Escape (disambiguation) =

The Sweet Escape is a 2006 album by Gwen Stefani.

Sweet Escape or The Sweet Escape may also refer to:

- "The Sweet Escape" (song), title song from above album by Gwen Stefani featuring Akon
- The Sweet Escape Tour, a concert tour by Gwen Stefani
- The Sweet Escape (film), a 2015 French comedy film
- "Sweet Escape", a song by Alesso

== See also ==
- "Suite Escape", a 2026 episode of American web series Battle for Dream Island
