= Venezuela Aid Live =

2019 benefit concert for Venezuela

- Logo featuring Venezuela and the Guayana Esequiba
- Date: 22 February 2019
- Venue: Tienditas Bridge
- Location: Cúcuta, Colombia; 7.875924°N 72.454295°W
- Type: Benefit concert
- Organized by: Richard Branson with Bruno Ocampo, Fernan Ocampo and Ricardo Leyva
- Website: VenezuelaAidLive.com

Venezuela Aid Live was a concert to benefit Venezuela in Cúcuta, Colombia, a city near the Venezuelan border, on 22 February 2019. The all-day concert, called Música por Venezuela: Ayuda y Libertad (transl. Music for Venezuela: Aid and Freedom), was organized by Richard Branson and Bruno Ocampo, and featured over thirty of the best known Latin American artists from nine countries. The concert's slogan was, "Let the stars shine for all".

Venezuela Live Aid's charity page said, "Not that long ago, [Venezuela] was the wealthiest country in South America. Now it is facing the worst humanitarian crisis in the Western Hemisphere." The purpose of the concert was to raise money and to pressure Nicolás Maduro to "open Venezuela's border so humanitarian aid stockpiled on Venezuela's borders can finally reach those millions who need it the most". Donations of US$2.5 million were raised online in the first four days after the concert.

The concert was entirely funded through donations, artists performed without charge, and the event itself was free. The concert was livestreamed on the Internet, with the aim to raise funds via website donations. The only webpage authorized for donations was the official website at www.VenezuelaAidLive.com.

== Background ==
A video with English subtitles produced for El Tiempo explaining the shortages

Shortages in Venezuela have occurred since the presidency of Hugo Chávez, with the country experiencing a scarcity rate of 24.7% in 2007. Venezuela has also been suffering a socioeconomic crisis under Nicolás Maduro, as rampant crime, hyperinflation and shortages diminished the quality of life since 2010. Beginning in 2015, the Maduro government rejected offers of aid, stating that there was no humanitarian crisis in Venezuela and that such claims were only used to justify foreign intervention; his refusal of aid worsened the situation. The National Assembly of Venezuela declared a "health humanitarian crisis" in January 2016, given the "serious shortage of medicines, medical supplies and deterioration of humanitarian infrastructure", asking Maduro's government to "guarantee immediate access to (...) essential medicines".

Near the end of 2018—before the Venezuelan presidential crisis when Juan Guaidó swore an oath to serve as interim president—the Maduro government said aid from other countries would be coordinated through the UN. Reuters reported concerns that the UN funding would be lost to corruption in Maduro's government. After the 2019 presidential crisis, Maduro continued to refuse aid, saying that Venezuela was not a country of "beggars".

Guaidó made bringing humanitarian aid to the hundreds of thousands of Venezuelans who could die if aid does not arrive a priority. Cúcuta has become the hub and focal point of the humanitarian aid crisis in Venezuela; in addition to being the site of the concert, it was the main border crossing point for thousands of Venezuelans fleeing their country in the Venezuela–Colombia migrant crisis, and the location where most of the aid was stockpiled. Images of the Tienditas Bridge, joining Colombia and Venezuela at Cúcuta, have come to symbolize the crisis because the "Venezuelan government blocked it with shipping containers". Due to the migrant crisis, the bridge was never opened after its 2016 completion, and was previously closed with fences and concrete block.

== Purpose ==
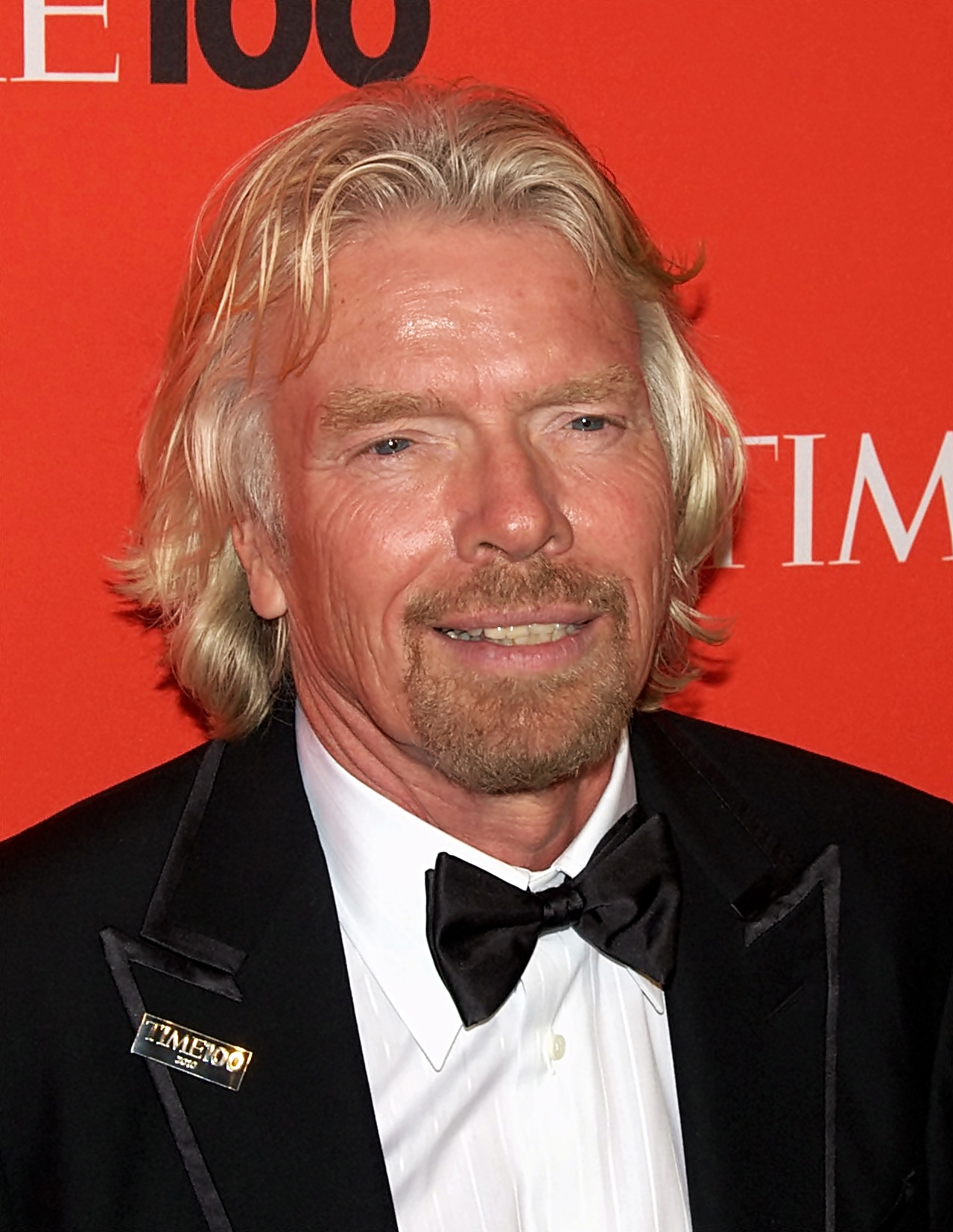
Branson in May 2010

Branson and his friend, Colombian businessman Bruno Ocampo, spoke of Venezuela and their passion for human rights in December 2018. Six weeks later, Branson wrote to Ocampo, inquiring about ways to help Venezuela, and by 30 January, they had made contact with interim president Guaidó and his mentor Leopoldo López. Branson announced on 14 February 2019 that his inspiration to organize the benefit concert was Guaidó and Lopez asking for humanitarian aid to be allowed into Venezuela. The concert was held only three weeks after the four men spoke.

Branson said the event was held to raise money for aid in Venezuela, to pressure the government of Nicolás Maduro to allow the humanitarian aid funded by various nations and stored in Cúcuta to be distributed within Venezuela, and to raise awareness of the crisis in Venezuela. He criticized Maduro's regime for refusing aid. The concert's Spanish website listed five general groups in Venezuela which the concert aimed to help: children who go hungry every day, grandparents left to die in the streets due to lack of welfare, parents who work hard and still can't provide, young people unjustly persecuted, and humanity deserving a life in peace.

A press release from Venezuela Aid Live said that all money donated to the cause would be given in humanitarian aid to the people of Venezuela. Branson asked for donations to reach "$100 million dollars in 60 days". The concert was livestreamed on the Internet, with the aim to raise additional funds via website donations. Organizers said the concert was entirely funded through donations, artists were not compensated for performing, and the concert was free.

Branson advertised that the concert would be "a beautiful concert", featuring a "fantastic line-up of top Latin American and global artists", that would be live-streamed around the world. The Spanish website of the concert featured the story of a young man who watched his mother suffer in pain from cancer, with a highlighted statement that 50% of cancer patients in Venezuela receive no treatment.

== Organization ==
The concert was modelled after The Concert for Bangladesh and Live Aid. It took place in Cúcuta, a Colombian city near the border with Venezuela, from 11:00 am to 4:00 pm. It was originally planned to be held on the San Martín Roundabout, a short distance from the Simon Bolivar International Bridge, but the location was changed to the Tienditas Bridge.

Colombian producers were businessmen Ricardo Leyva, and brothers Fernán and Bruno Ocampo. Leyva, who owns a marketing company called Sistole, was brought to the project by Bruno Ocampo, who had never previously organized a concert, and Leyva said they made it a priority to "guarantee world class content, with great sound and great production".

Leyva hired Persival and Árbol Naranja, production companies with experience at producing music concerts. A rotating stage 16 meters (52 ft) high with 11 sound towers and 400 tons of equipment were installed on the bridge. The rotating stage allowed one musician to be preparing during another's performance. Support for setting up live streaming was provided by YouTube, and WK Entertainment got streaming rights cleared.

At least 1,800 local police provided security, and hospital services were on alert. The aircraft flying in musicians and producers were quickly cleared through airports by Colombia, and a civic holiday was declared for the city of Cúcuta on the day of the concert. There were 1,300 journalists accredited to work the event (800 Colombian and 500 international); 1,800 people did logistical work, and 800 volunteers helped as well.

=== Attendance ===
Organizers said the space could accommodate up to 500,000 people, while they hoped for about 250,000. The Los Angeles Times and National Radio of Colombia estimated there were more than 200,000 present. Colombia's English-language newspaper and Billboard reported 300,000 or more. Concert organizers said the attendance was 370,000, as reported by CNN en Español.

Juan Guaidó defied the restriction imposed by the Maduro administration on him leaving Venezuela, and showed up at the concert. In a move that tested Maduro's authority, he was met by Colombian president Iván Duque, and welcomed by a crowd chanting, "Juan arrived!" Duque, Chilean president Sebastián Piñera, Paraguayan president Mario Abdo Benítez, and Luis Almagro, Secretary General of the Organization of American States attended. Piñera said he was at the concert to demonstrate solidarity with the people of Venezuela, to help them recover democracy under the leadership of Guaidó, and to support the collection and distribution of humanitarian aid. He described the Maduro government as lacking in respect for human rights and undemocratic, and said that "Maduro is part of the problem, not the solution." Benítez expressed confidence that the people of Venezuela, for resisting tyranny, would go down in history, adding that a free Venezuela was close.

Juanes, one of the performers, commented that "Music and art will always be fundamental in building peace in any society. The world’s atmosphere is more tense now. There’s less innocence and more information online. The presence of the presidents, in a way, changed the humanitarian slant and made it different."

=== Financial ===
With a goal to raise US$100 million in 60 days from 22 February, in the first four days, US$2.5 million was raised online, with donations to be accepted through 22 April. Facebook expedited their process for setting up non-profit status, to help get donations in quickly. Ocampo explained that credit card processing was not fully in place at the time of the concert, and that credit card penetration in Latin American is low, but that other donation methods were put in place after the concert.

Some musicians were flown to the concert, but none charged to perform; total costs for artists was US$60,000 and the overall cost of the concert was under US$600,000. The main donors were Argos, Betcris and WeSend.

== Performers ==
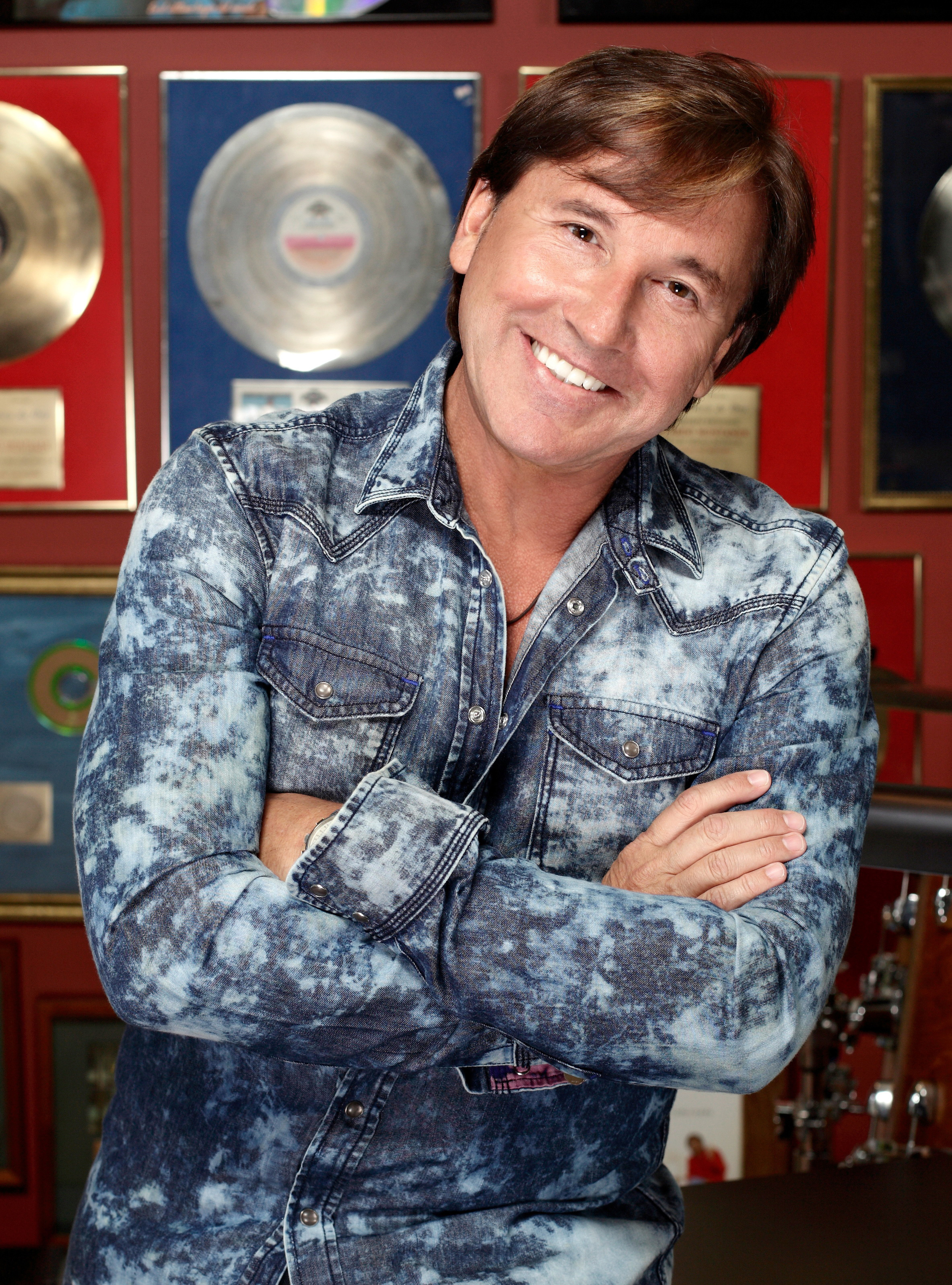
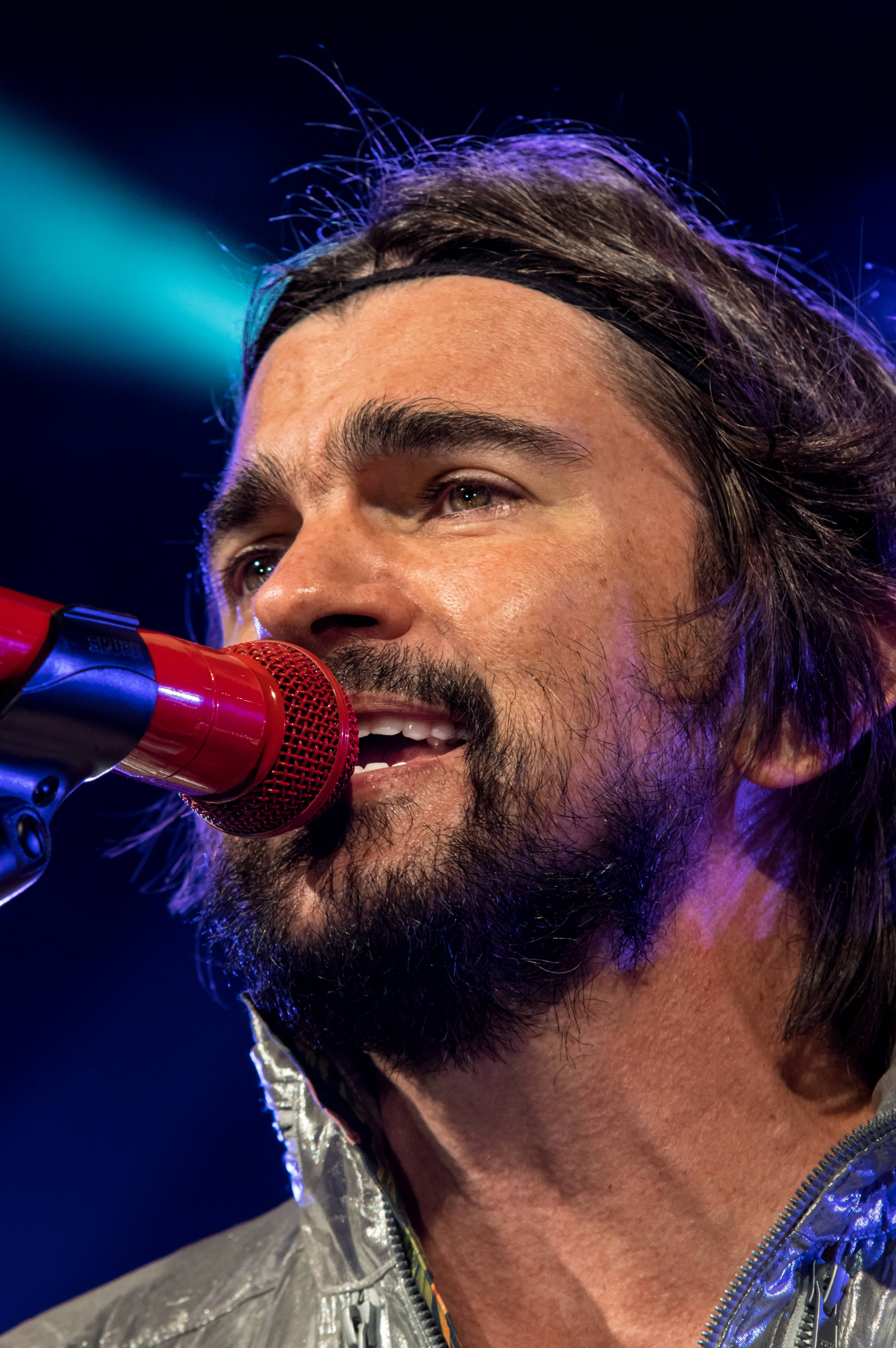
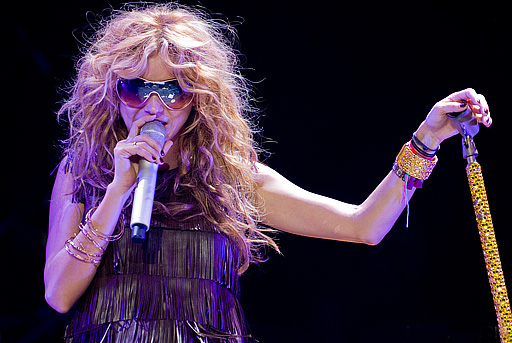
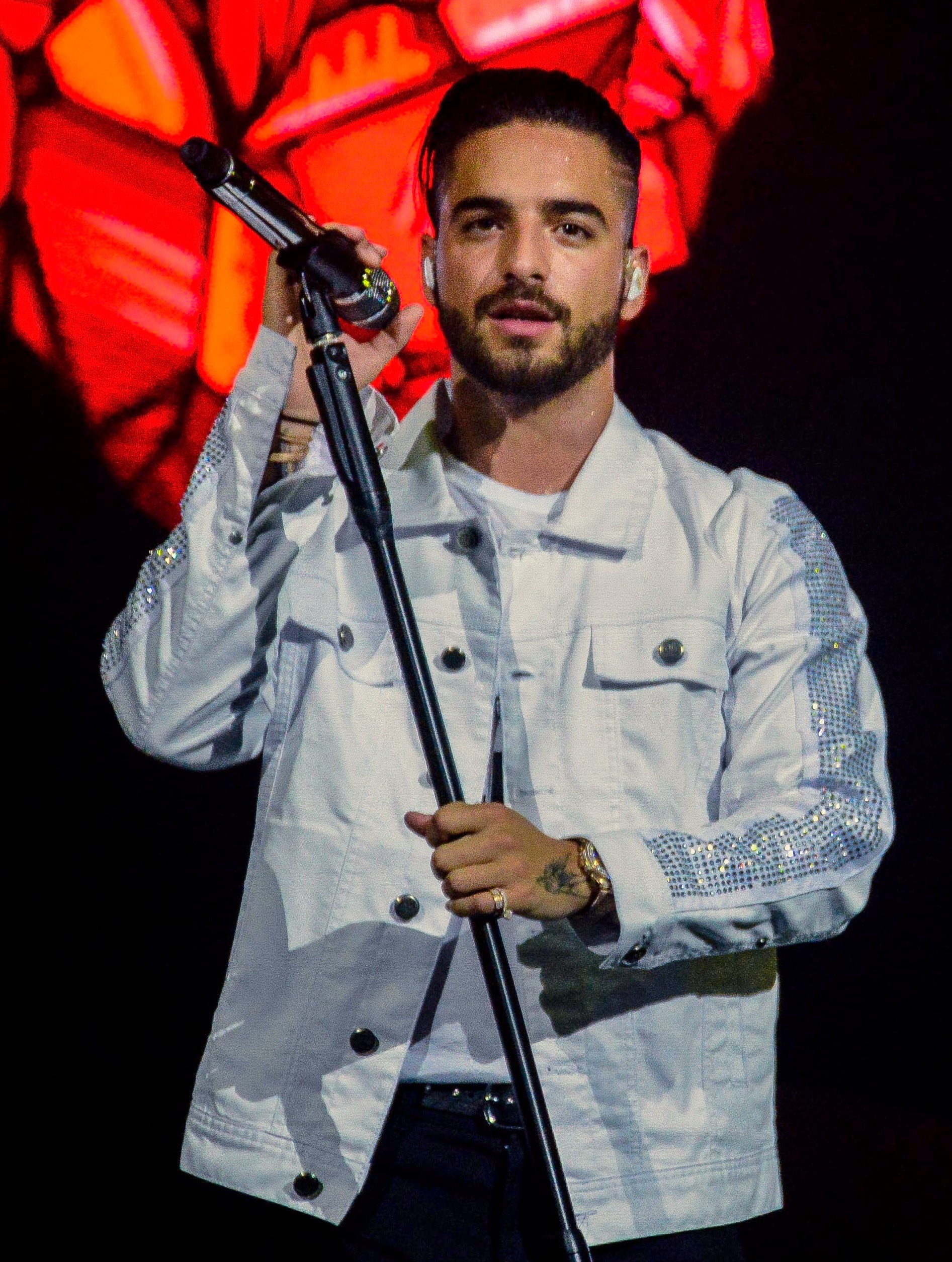
Top: Ricardo Montaner and Juanes;
middle: Paulina Rubio; bottom: Maluma

Most of the 31 performers (Note: Some sources say there were 32 performers; Rudy Mancuso, who was among the 32 performers invited, did not attend.) were Venezuelan and Colombian; they were joined by artists from Argentina, the Dominican Republic, Mexico, Puerto Rico, Spain, Sweden and the United States. Branson joined some on stage.

Caterina Valentino, Erika de la Vega, George Harris, Lele Pons, Luis Chataing, Nelson Bustamente, Patricia Velásquez, and Patricia Zavala (all Venezuelans) were announcers, as were Camila Canabal, Hannah Stocking, and Juanpa Zurita.

Performing artists were:

1. Alejandro Sanz (Spanish)
2. Alesso (Swedish)
3. Camilo Echeverry (Colombian)
4. Carlos Baute (Venezuelan)
5. Carlos Vives (Colombian)
6. Cholo Valderrama (Colombian)
7. Chyno (Venezuelan)
8. Danny Ocean (Venezuelan)
9. Diego Torres (Argentine)
10. Fonseca (Colombian)
11. Gusi (Colombian–Venezuelan)
12. Jencarlos Canela (Cuban–American)
13. Jorge Glem (Venezuelan)
14. Jorge Villamizar (Colombian)
15. José Luis Rodríguez "El Puma" (Venezuela)
16. Juan Luis Guerra (Dominican Republic)
17. Juanes (Colombian)
18. Lele Pons (Venezuelan–American)
19. Luis Fonsi (Puerto Rican)
20. Maluma (Colombian)
21. Maná (Mexican)
22. Mau y Ricky (Venezuelan)
23. Miguel Bosé (Panamanian–Spanish)
24. Nacho (Venezuelan)
25. Paulina Rubio (Mexican)
26. Reik (Mexican)
27. Reymar Perdomo (Venezuelan)
28. Reynaldo Armas (Venezuelan)
29. Ricardo Montaner (Venezuelan–Argentine)
30. Santiago Cruz (Colombian)
31. Silvestre Dangond (Colombian)

Venezuelan musician Franco de Vita said that he had been told that there was so much interest from musicians that there was no more room and he could not be included; he said it was unfortunate that he was unable to participate, but he encouraged people to donate. The Venezuela Live Aid organization issued a press release, in which they apologized for not being able to accommodate all of the artists who wanted to participate, asked for their understanding, and said they hoped to do more benefit concerts in the future.

== Performances ==
During his performance, Bosé said, "Enough oppression already. The people shout, united today for their freedom". He directed comments at Maduro, saying Venezuelans wanted him out now, that he "should be captured and accused of crimes against humanity", and reminding Maduro that Venezuela does not belong to him and his narcos. He also directed comments at the United Nations Michelle Bachelet, telling her to "move your buttocks" to come and personally see the situation in Venezuela. He was criticized for his offensive tone and later apologized, saying instead that Bachelet should "raise her voice".

Rubio expressed pride to be present, and thanked Venezuelans for "believing that change is possible", while Dangond said it was an honor to be able to contribute. Torres said, "We are artists united without any political flag and we are here to help the people who need it. It is important to never lower your arms."

After Torres performance, Mexican motivational speaker Daniel Habif took the stage to give what Milenio called the "most moving moment of the concert". He said "this situation is not the death of Venezuela, rather its birth before the world". Speaking to a crowd he brought to tears, he said, "You, Nicolás [Maduro], rotted before you matured", and "faith has been activated as a cannon".

Baute called it a "magical day to build bridges of hope ... We want and we demand free elections now", adding: "We are not only here to open the humanitarian channel, but because tomorrow we will be free."

In an emotional moment that brought the crowd to cheers, Nacho began to speak about union, reconciliation and forgiveness, then invited Chyno (Chino) to the stage; they were reunited in support of Venezuela for the first time in two years, since their enmity and separation as the successful duo of Chino & Nacho.

== Reception ==
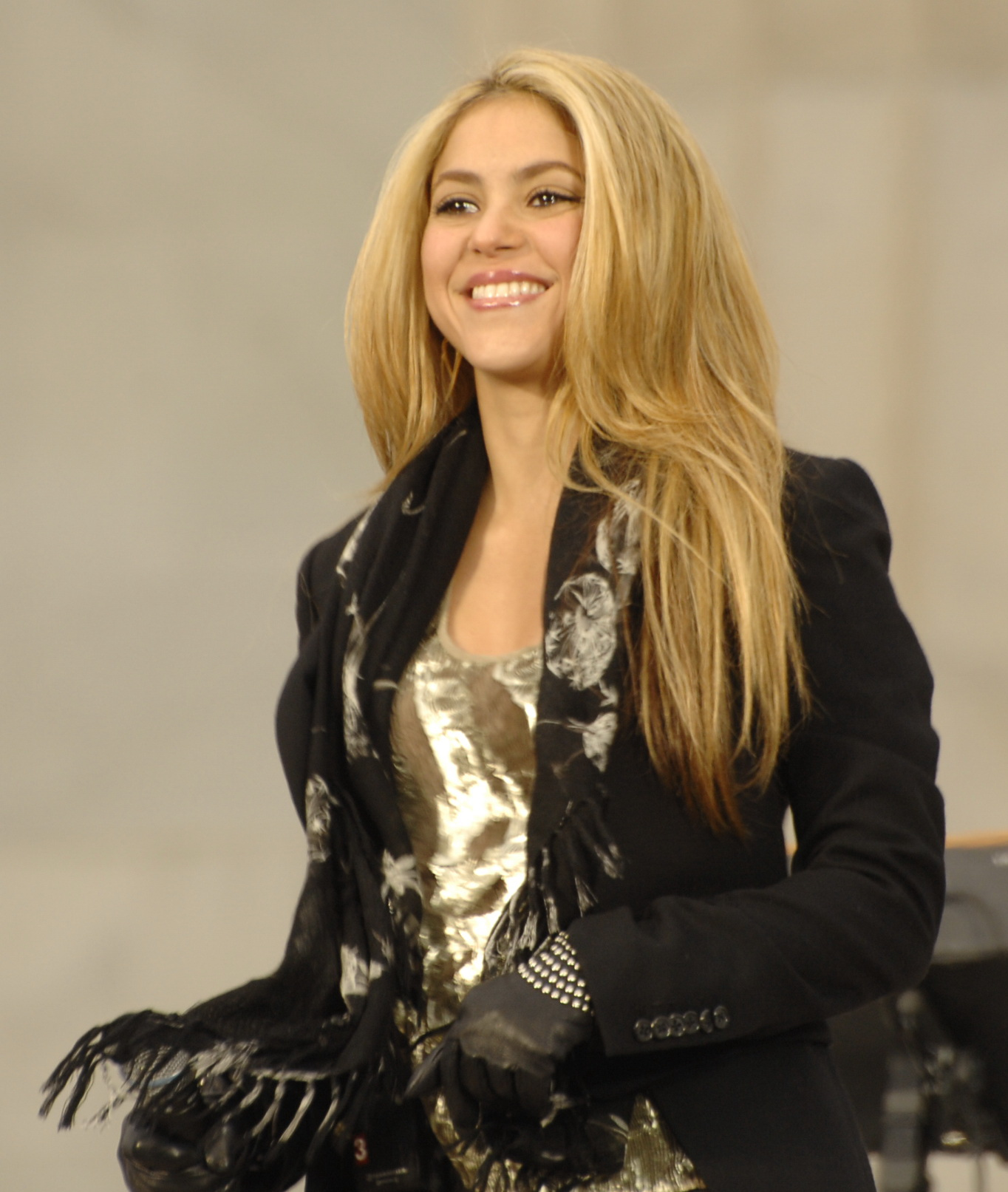
Colombian singer Shakira shared support for the event

Juan Guaidó showed his support to every artist that confirmed their presentation at the Aid Live concert. On the other hand, he characterized the announcement of Maduro's rival concert as a bad joke, saying, "... to mock the Venezuelan's people's needs in this way, you have to be very cynical" to take Venezuelan food to Colombia during Venezuela's humanitarian crisis.

Rolling Stone magazine said the musical production "left much to be desired due to technical difficulties, issues with instruments, the overuse of backing tracks and the crowd being excessively far from the stage", while acknowledging that Branson had succeeded in bringing world attention to the effort. One of the coordinators involved in the attempts to bring aid shipments into Venezuela, Vladimir Torres, stated that the concert was a "beautiful mistake"; the Miami Herald reported that less than one percent of the concert goers stayed to help bring aid through the border the day after the concert, and many volunteers who attended were physically drained by the day-long concert.

Roger Waters made statements and released a video on Twitter opposing the Venezuela Aid Live concert. He said: "The Red Cross and the U.N., unequivocally agree, don’t politicize aid. Leave the Venezuelan people alone to exercise their legal right to self determination." In the video, he says the concert "has nothing to do with humanitarian aid at all. It has to do with Richard Branson … having bought the U.S. saying, ‘We have decided to take over Venezuela, for whatever our reasons may be.’ Do we really want Venezuela to turn in to another Iraq or Syria or Libya? I don't and neither do the Venezuelan people." Argentina's Clarín newspaper said earlier in the month that Waters called Venezuela a "true democracy", and was criticized by his fans for his stance. Branson responded that Waters is one of the few musicians in the world who does not know, with respect to Venezuela, what he is talking about. Branson expanded: "He says that it's a democracy, people are not suffering, and it's just not true. Anybody who knows anything about Venezuela should know that that is a load of a rubbish and Venezuelans need help." Colombian singer Juanes, one of the Aid Live performers, was asked what he thought of Waters' statements, and replied that, while he is a great fan of Waters, Waters "does not have any idea what is going on in Venezuela. No idea. Him, Sean Penn and everyone who has talked that way, have no idea what they are talking about." Juanes said he joined the Venezuela Aid Live concert "to give voice to Venezuelans and what is happening there ... [to] recover their freedom".

Colombian singer Shakira shared support for the event, stating "I join this initiative for the Venezuelan people who are going through one of the most difficult moments in their history, we can not allow the struggle of some politicians and the interests of a few to be above the needs of people". Shakira also called for the entry of aid in Venezuela and promoted donations for the event.

In an article entitled "Eight memorable phrases of Venezuela Aid Live" (Spanish: Ocho frases memorables del Venezuela Aid Live), National Radio of Colombia (RNC) said that concert-goers enjoyed a sunny day with no significant inconveniences, and highlighted the inspirational words of Carlos Baute twice, Miguel Bosé, Silvestre Dangond, Paulina Rubio, and Diego Torres, in addition to the words of Wendy Villamizar and the speech by motivational speaker Daniel Habif.

== Use of funds raised ==
Funds raised were to be used for "sustainable, effective and transparent" humanitarian aid for Venezuela, according to the organizers. The organizers stated that funds would be split between Venezuela and Colombian refugees in Venezuela, and that they would not deliver money to any government or political organization. PricewaterhouseCoopers published a 2020 report on the allocation of funds, stating that no abnormalities were found.

== Maduro response ==
=== Alternative concert ===
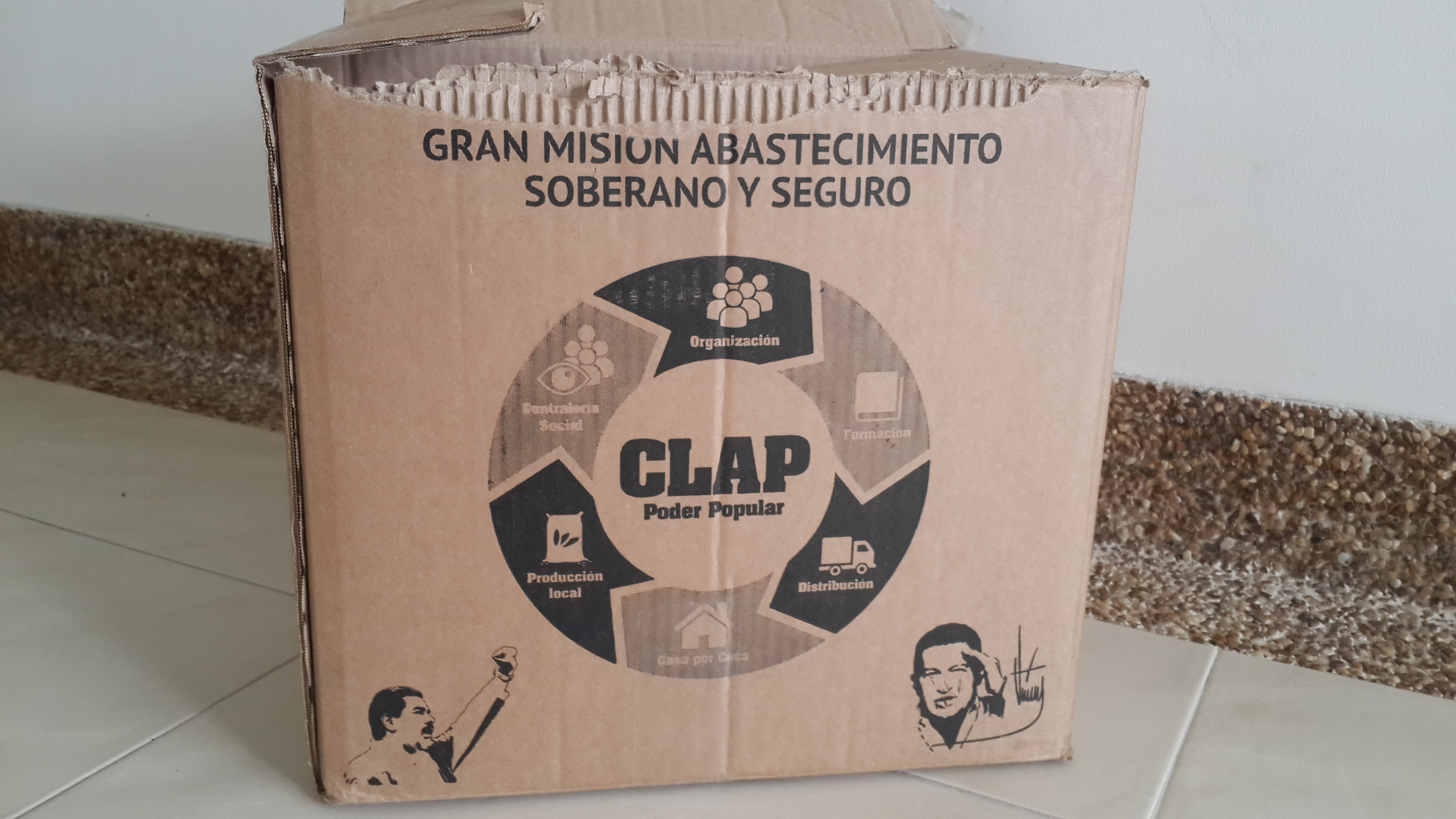
A food box provided by CLAP

The Maduro government responded by saying it would hold a rival concert on the Venezuelan side of the border at the Simón Bolívar International Bridge on 22 and 23 February, with a proposed slogan of "Nothing for war, hands off Venezuela". A little more than one day before the planned event, United Socialist Party of Venezuela politician Darío Vivas announced that the location would be changed, and that the event would be held instead at the opposite end of the same bridge as the Venezuela Aid Live Concert, about 300 meters (330 yd) away. Vivas said, "What they do on the other side of the border is their problem ... We will defend our territory."

Information Minister Jorge Rodríguez said free medical attention would be given to Colombians and Venezuelans at the event. He also said the government would distribute 20,000 boxes of subsidized food from the Local Committees for Supply and Production (CLAP)—a program from which, according to Luisa Ortega Díaz (former Attorney General under Maduro) Maduro personally profits (Note: According to Ortega Díaz, CLAP made contracts with Group Grand Limited, a Mexican entity owned by Maduro through frontmen. Group Grand Limited would sell foodstuffs to CLAP and receive government funds. On 19 April 2018, after a multilateral meeting between over a dozen European and Latin American countries, US Treasury Department officials said they had investigated with Colombian officials corrupt import programs of the Maduro administration including CLAP. They explained that Venezuelan officials pocketed 70% of the proceeds allocated for importation programs destined to alleviate hunger in Venezuela. Treasury officials said they sought to seize the proceeds that were being funneled into the accounts of corrupt Venezuelan officials and hold them for a possible future government in Venezuela.)—to the poor residents of Cúcuta.

Estimates of attendance ranged from 1,000 to 2,500 people.

Argentine rock band Bersuit Vergarabat took part in the concert, saying "Venezuela libre! [Donald] Trump, go away, nobody wants you here!" Venezuelan heavy metal rocker Paul Gillman also participated.

Two days before the concert, the only participant confirmed was Paul Gillman. La Patilla reported that all other singers proposed had turned down the invitation to perform.

César Pérez Rossi of Venezuela's Serenata Guayanesa was reported by NTN24 saying that "it is totally false that we are going to be in this concert." Colombia's National Radio reported that Las Chicas del Can from the Dominican Republic said statements that they would participate were "fake news", and asked that their fans spread word on social media to deny the claim. A spokesperson for Colombia's Grupo Niche was reported by LA FM Colombian radio station to have denied the invitation to present, expressing concern about the humanitarian situation in Venezuela.

Puerto Rican musician Willie González refused a contract to participate in the Maduro concert, saying that he was fortunate to not need the money and that his dignity was more important to him than money, and saying on Instagram that he was "not political ... but he is human". According to Venezuela al Dia, González' rejection of the contract, saying he does not need the money, was an indication that Venezuela's money was being used to fund the concert; the Venezuela Aid Live Branson concert was funded by donations.

Venezuelan musicians Servando & Florentino gave a quick and emphatic "no" to the proposal that they participate in the Maduro concert, although La Patilla said they have supported Maduro in the past. Omar Enrique, a Venezuelan singer who according to NTN24 was denied entry into Colombia a few weeks before the concert because of alleged ties to chavismo, rejected what he called United States' "military intervention" and regretted that other commitments kept him from participating.

Pink Floyd's Roger Waters afterwards dedicated a video of him singing "We shall overcome" (Spanish: Venceremos) to the Maduro concert.

=== Censorship and disruption ===
The day before the Venezuela Aid Live concert, the Colombian government expelled from Cúcuta five agents of Venezuela's internal security and intelligence service, SEBIN, who Colombia said were in the country on an "irregular" status. A Colombian immigration official said, "We are not going to permit foreign citizens entry to our country to affect the social order and peace." According to El Universal, Colombian immigration official, Christian Krüger Sarmiento, said the government of Maduro had a "manifest interest" in affecting our "national security in the face of the events that are about to take place".

During the Venezuela Aid Live concert, NatGeo and Antena 3 were removed from cable and satellite TV providers in Venezuela for broadcasting the event. During the performances, access to YouTube was also blocked for users of CANTV, the main internet provider in Venezuela.

== See also ==
- Freddy Superlano
- Live Aid
