= You Take My Breath Away =

You Take My Breath Away may refer to:

- "You Take My Breath Away" (Rex Smith song), 1979
- "You Take My Breath Away" (The Knife song), 2003
- "You Take My Breath Away", a song by Claire Hamill
- "You Take My Breath Away", a song by Design
- "You Take My Breath Away", a song by Lange under the name SuReaL
- "You Take My Breath Away", a song by Sarah Brightman from Fly
- "You Take My Breath Away", a song by Queen from A Day at the Races

== See also ==
- Take My Breath Away (disambiguation)
