= Niko Bellotto =

Spanish musician

Niko Bellotto is a solo electronic music producer and DJ who began in the late 80s. He is a member of the electronic tango-infused band, Baires. Bellotto was born in Sweden and raised in Spain, Sweden and Argentina His career spans three decades, first introduced into the electronic field in the early 1980s as a DJ. He blends a variety of styles including house music, tech-house, and rare grooves.

Bellotto created and managed Tangent Beats, a record label based in Stockholm, Sweden, which has released material from artists such as Alexi Delano, Casey Hogan, John Dahlback, and Håkan Lidbo. In 2001 and 2002, Bellotto was nominated for two Grammys for his production skills in electronic music. With dozens of 12-inch singles, collaborations, and remixes to his credit many of which have been released under various record labels, such as Defected Records, Plastic City Records, Suburbia Records, Loop Records, and Route 33 as well as his own imprint, Tangent Beats. Bellotto is currently managing the Eat My House Label featuring his own productions and music from Sebastian Gudding, Özgür Can, Jusso Pikanen.

In 2003, Bellotto formed Baires with fellow DJ and producer, Juan Fernando Maguid (aka DJ Djablo, Detonator, and Alta Fuse Collective). Baires is a 5-piece live band experimenting with electronic elements, jazz, and tango music stemming from their Argentinian roots. Their most recent album, Exilio was released September 2005.

== Discography ==
=== Albums ===
- baires / exilio / tangent beats
- purobeach vol 3 / seamless recordings
- purobeach vol 4 / seamless recordings
- puro desert lounge vol 1 / seamless recordings
- puro desert lounge vol 2 / seamless recordings

=== Singles/EPs ===
- Niko Bellotto & Dick Track/World Club EP/Loop Rec
- Adam Beyer & Niko Bellotto/The Pump EP/Primate Rec
- Niko Bellotto & Gol/State Of Mind EP/Plastic City
- Niko Bellotto/Conesa/Suburbia/Plastic City
- Niko Bellotto & Pawel Kobak/More Than You Know EP/Tangent Beats
- Håkan Lidbo & Niko Bellotto/From Stockholm With Love EP/Tangent Beats
- Martin Venetjoky & Niko Bellotto/Jazzed EP/Tangent Beats
- Baires / Baires EP / Tangent Beats
- Baires / Exilio (Album) Tangent Beats
- Niko Bellotto Feat Aural / My Definition EP / Tangent Beats
- Niko Bellotto / gw anthem / white and white

=== Remixes ===
- Håkan Lidbo / What Is Love (Temperamento Mix)
- Penguin Republic / The 9 / (Nb's Straight 2 The 4 Rmx)Tangent Beats
- John Dahlbäck / Parken / Niko Bellotto remix / Tangent Beats
- Pawel Kobak Feat Maria Angelli (Niko Bellotto Rmx)Route 33
- Alcazar / We keep on rocking (Bellotto and Cabrera club mix)
- Sash and vincent inc / 50 ways (Bellotto and Holmberg remix) Manuscript recordings
- Elin Lanto / love made me stupid (addictive + addictive dub remixes) catchy tunes
- Paula Lobos /
- Meja / butterflies / Sony music
- Martin Stenmarck / Las Vegas
- Laleh / Colors
- Sebastian Gudding / Zinken
- Sebastian Gudding /

=== Remixed By ===
- Dimitri From Paris (Niko Bellotto & Pawel Kobak/Love For You) Defected
- Pete Moss (Trumpet Jam) Test 542
- Alexkid (Baires Theme) Tangent Beats
- Ben Wijay (Baires Theme) Tangent Beats
- Martin Venetjoky (Latin Impressions) Tangent Beats
- Morgan Page ( Love for you ) Tangent Beats
- Aural ( Love for you ) Tangent Beats
- Alexi Delano ( Love for you ) Tangent Beats
- Joel Mull ( trumpet jam ) Tangent Beats
- Sebastian Gudding ( Sunshine ) Eat My House
