= Bad Feeling (Oompa Loompa) =

Single by Jagwar Twin
- Released: December 15, 2023
- Genre: Alternative rock; reggae; alternative hip hop
- Length: 2:13
- Label: Big Loud Rock; Warner Chappell Music
- Songwriters: Roy English; Ryan Daly; Sean Van Vleet; Leslie Bricusse; Anthony Newley
- Producers: Ryan Daly; Roy English

Jagwar Twin singles chronology
"Life Is Good" (2023)	"Bad Feeling (Oompa Loompa)" (2023)

Music video
- "Bad Feeling (Oompa Loompa)" on YouTube

"Bad Feeling (Oompa Loompa)" is a 2023 alternative rock song released by Jagwar Twin (Roy English) under the Big Loud Rock label. The song utilizes the lyrics and melody from the refrain of the Oompa Loompa songs in the 1971 film Willy Wonka & the Chocolate Factory. It was produced by Ryan Daly and Roy English, and written by English, Daly, and Sean Van Vleet, with credit to the original composers of the 1971 work.

Although unaffiliated with the 2023 film Wonka, the song was purposely released on December 15, 2023, to coincide with that film's release in the United States. In a statement about the song, Twin referred to it as "a chocolate covered reminder to trust your gut". The song was described by journalist Amanda McArthur as containing "spooky sounds, akin to a distorted lullaby" as well as a "pulsing beat and haunting whistles".

As of January 25, 2024, the song has peaked at number 24 on the Hot Alternative Songs and number 36 on the Hot Rock & Alternative Songs record charts published by Billboard.

== Charts ==
Chart performance for "Bad Feeling (Oompa Loompa)"
Chart (2023–2024)	Peak position
US Hot Rock & Alternative Songs (Billboard)	24
US Pop Airplay (Billboard)	33
