= I Wanna Know (Alesso and Jolin Tsai song) =

Single by Alesso and Jolin Tsai
- Released: September 30, 2016
- Genre: Dance
- Length: 3:35
- Label: Eternal; Amy Thomson
- Songwriters: Jolin Tsai; Alessandro Lindblad; Kahouly Nicolay Sereba; Vincent Dery; Ozzy Jaquesson Sowe
- Producer: Alessandro Lindblad

Alesso singles chronology
"Anthem" (2016)	"I Wanna Know" (2016)	"Take My Breath Away" (2016)

Jolin Tsai singles chronology
"The Third Person and I" (2014)	"I Wanna Know" (2016)	"Play (Alesso Remix Version)" (2016)

Music video
- "I Wanna Know" on YouTube

"I Wanna Know" is a song by Swedish DJ and record producer Alesso, featuring Taiwanese singer Jolin Tsai. The track was written by Tsai, Alessandro Lindblad, Kahouly Nicolay Sereba, Vincent Dery, and Ozzy Jaquesson Sowe, and produced by Lindblad. It was released as a single on September 30, 2016, by Eternal and Amy Thomson.

== Background and release ==
On September 30, 2016, Tsai represented Asia at the International Music Summit: Asia-Pacific in Shanghai. On the same day, Alesso released the collaborative English single "I Wanna Know", featuring Tsai. The track's music video was later unveiled on October 10, 2016.

== Commercial performance ==
The song ranked at number 25 on Taiwan's Hit FM Top 100 Singles of 2016.

== Critical reception ==
Sina Entertainment noted that Tsai's version of "I Wanna Know" offered a reinterpretation of Alesso's earlier collaboration with Nico & Vinz, though the two versions differed notably in both rhythm and emotional tone. The review described Tsai's rendition as "urban and stylish", with a hypnotic, urban club atmosphere that combined passion and brightness. The rhythm was described as brisk and refreshing, with Alesso's restrained arrangement contributing to a more nuanced, mid-tempo beat. The deep electric bass lines were noted for capturing both wild rhythms and elegant intensity.

Tencent Entertainment critic April Yin praised Alesso's ability to blend elements outside traditional house and trance music, incorporating an open structure, disco-inspired bass lines, funk guitar riffs, and future bass rhythms. This resulted in a "fresh, fashionable" sound, which balanced technological precision with "romantic human warmth," distancing the track from the mechanical nature often associated with EDM.

Another Tencent critic, San Shi Yi Sheng, observed that "I Wanna Know" deviated from the usual EDM focus on "carpe diem" themes. Instead, with its repeated refrain "I wanna know, where do we go, where do we go from here", the track conveyed a sense of melancholy, offering a deeper emotional layer within the EDM genre.

== Live performances ==
On October 1, 2016, Alesso and Tsai performed "I Wanna Know" together at the Storm Music Festival in Shanghai.

== Release history ==
Release dates and formats for "I Wanna Know"
Region	Date	Format(s)	Distributor
Various	June 13, 2014	Digital download; streaming	Eternal; Amy Thomson
China	June 13, 2014	Streaming	YDX
