= Jagwar Twin =

American musician (born 1988)

- Also known as: Roy English (2006–2015)
- Born: Brandon Roy Wronski; May 22, 1988 (age 38); Los Angeles, California, U.S.
- Genres: Alternative rock; rock
- Occupations: Musician; singer; songwriter; record producer
- Years active: 2003–present
- Labels: Original Mind; Atlantic; Big Loud; Mercury; Republic
- Formerly of: Eye Alaska
- Website: www.jagwartwin.com

Brandon Roy Wronski (born May 22, 1988), known professionally as Jagwar Twin and formerly as Roy English, is an American musician and singer. He is currently signed to Big Loud Rock under Big Loud Records.

He started out as a member of the band Dead Letter Diaries, before founding the bands Eye Alaska and Canary Dynasty. Going solo in 2015, he has since written and produced music alongside other industry artists, including Jeff Bhasker, Teddy Riley, Rick Nowels, Matt Wallace, Dave Sitek, and Alesso. His debut studio album, Subject to Flooding, was released in September 2018 in collaboration with producers S1 and Linus, and featured contributions from Travis Barker of blink-182. He has now 3 albums: Subject to Flooding, 33, and And Lucius Lullaby, with sir lucius.

== History ==
=== 2003–2011: Early History ===
English started out as a member of the band Dead Letter Diaries. In 2006, Roy became one of the founding members of the American indie-rock band Eye Alaska, which also included Cameron Trowbridge, Christopher Osegueda, Chase Kensrue, and Han Ko. The band toured the United States from 2007 to 2011, releasing their EP Yellow & Elephant and their 2009 album Genesis Underground, before disbanding.

=== 2012–2017: Solo debut and I'm Not Here Pt. 1 ===
In 2012, following the disbandment of Eye Alaska, English contemplated departing his career in music, before meeting Jeff Bhasker. Becoming a mentor, Bhasker helped English shape his songwriting and production skills. In 2014, alongside S1 and Rick Nowels, English produced Lana Del Rey's 2014 single “I Can Fly”. In 2014, English contributed to the soundtrack for Tim Burton's movie Big Eyes with Lana Del Rey.

On January 22, 2015, English released a single titled “Julianne.” English also co-wrote and was featured on Alesso's single "Cool." Released February 13, 2015 on BBC Radio 1, “Cool” peaked at number 10 in the UK Singles Chart and number 3 on the UK Dance Chart. The track charted number 14 on Billboard's US Dance/Electronic Songs charts and number 2 on both Billboard's US Dance Club Songs and Dance/Mix Show Airplay.

Immediately after, English was featured on "Tongue Tied July” with Michael Brun. On April 26, 2016, English released his EP I'm Not Here Pt. 1, which included three new songs: "Wasted Youth", "Can't Lie" and "Oxy." In May of the same year, English released a stripped-down version of “Can't Lie” and was announced as the opening act for 5 Seconds of Summer during their Sounds Live Feels Live World Tour on select North American dates.

In March 2017, English released "Hotel Pools 01101001", performing it on NBC's Today after being chosen as Elvis Duran's Artist of the Month. The song was officially remixed by Badhabit and shortly after also by producer A.K. Tribe. A few months later, English released "Outa My Head 01101110", a collaboration with DJ and producer Badhabit.

=== 2018–2021: Jagwar Twin and Subject to Flooding ===
Following the release of "Outa My Head 01101110", English began working with producers S1, Linus and Travis Barker of blink-182. English traveled from Joshua Tree and Haiti to Ireland's coast and Florence, Italy for recording sessions.

English, under the name of Jagwar Twin, released his debut single “Loser” on September 7, 2018, after writing it around 2017.

English teamed up with producer S1 (Kanye West, Lorde) and rock producer Linus to develop Jagwar Twin’s musical identity. Roy English donned the name Jagwar Twin as a reference to the ancient Mayan belief that jaguars possessed mythical powers to see into all living beings.

Released by Zane Lowe on Beats 1, "Loser" amassed over 100k streams in its first 24 hours. “Loser” received radio play upon release and was picked up for playlisting on Spotify, Apple Music and Amazon Music. Of the song's message, English has explained, "We're all on this beautiful planet. We're made of the same stardust. We're all losers, and we're also all brilliant, beautiful souls."

In 2019, English embarked on a headlining tour, titled the "Live in Close Proximity" tour. The tour consisted of 8 dates, all in the US, beginning on July 20, 2019 in Anaheim, California at The Parish at House of Blues and concluded on August 30, 2019, in Seattle, Washington at the Bumbershoot festival.

On April 24, 2020, English performed at Elvis Duran's Stay at Home Ball with Calum Hood of 5 Seconds of Summer.

On June 8, 2020, English released a music video for his 2018 single, "Shine".

On December 21, 2020, English released a music video for his song "Happy Face", which features Josh Dun of alternative rock band Twenty One Pilots on drums.

=== 2022–present: 33 and Hall of Mirrors ===
On September 30, 2022, English released his second studio album, titled "33", including 10 songs and a collaboration with little luna ("Pay Attention"). The album was released by Big Loud Rock / Big Loud Records and produced by Matthew Pauling (Twenty One Pilots, 5 Seconds Of Summer).

The album included previously released singles "Happy Face", "I Like to Party" and "Down to You".

"Happy Face" garnered over 70 million streams, 50 million video views and radio plays by multiple US alternate radio stations upon release.

On September 29, 2022, English performed at the Firefly Festival.

On December 15, 2023, English released the single "Bad Feeling (Oompa Loompa)" to coincide with the American release of the film Wonka.

As of January 25, 2024, "Bad Feeling (Oompa Loompa)" by Jagwar Twin has reached number 24 on Billboard's Hot Alternative Songs chart and number 36 on their Hot Rock & Alternative Songs chart.

== Discography ==
=== Albums ===
Title	Details
Subject to Flooding	Released: September 21, 2018; Format: Digital download; Label: Original Mind, Atlantic
33	Released: September 30, 2022; Format: Digital download; Label: Big Loud Rock
lucius lullaby	Released: March 27, 2026; Format: Digital download; Label: Big Loud Rock

=== Extended plays ===
Title	Details
Credited as Roy English
FearLove	Released: November 1, 2011; Format: Digital download; Label: Canary Dynasty
I'm Not Here, Pt. 1	Released: May 6, 2016; Format: Digital download; Label: Canary Dynasty

Title	Details
The Circle: The Great Jagwar Myth	Released: February 17, 2023; Format: Digital download; Label: Big Loud

=== Singles ===
List of singles released as Roy English, with showing year released and album
Title	Year	Album
"Cool" (featuring Alesso)	2015	Forever

List of singles released as Jagwar Twin, with selected peak chart positions
Title	Year	Peak chart positions		Album
Title	Year	US Rock	US Pop	Album
"Loser"	2018	—	—	Subject to Flooding
"Shine"	2018	—	—	Subject to Flooding
"Long Time Coming"	2018	—	—	Subject to Flooding
"Happy Face"	2020	—	—	33
"I Like to Party"	2020	—	—	33
"Down to You"	2021	—	—	33
"Great Time to Be Human"	2023	—	—	Non-album singles
"All My Friends"	2023	—	—	Non-album singles
"Good Time"	2023	—	—	Non-album singles
"Life Is Good"	2023	—	—	Non-album singles
"Bad Feeling (Oompa Loompa)"	2023	36	33	Non-album singles
"tomorrow [ANGLE OF ETERNITY]"	2024	—	—	Non-album singles
"The Watchers"	2024	—	—	Non-album singles
"dumbledore"	2025	—	—	Non-album singles
"SideQuest"	2025	—	—	Non-album singles
"MAGIK"	2025	—	—	Non-album singles
"BALLERINA BOY"	2025	—	—	Non-album singles
"LOOP"	2025	—	—	Non-album singles
"not your homie"	2025	—	—	lucius lullaby
"welcome to the circus"	2026	—	—	lucius lullaby

== Tours ==
=== Opening act ===
- 5 Seconds of Summer – Sounds Live Feels Live World Tour (2016) (Select North American dates only)
- Lovelytheband – Finding It Hard to Smile Tour (2019)
- Avril Lavigne – Head Above Water Tour (2019)
- Firefly Music Festival (2022)
- Transviolet - Body: The Tour (2023)
- 30 Seconds To Mars - Seasons Tour (2024)

=== Headlining ===
- Live in Close Proximity Tour (2019)
