= Cool (Alesso song) =

Single by Alesso featuring Roy English

from the album Forever
- Released: 16 February 2015
- Recorded: 2014
- Genre: EDM
- Length: 3:43 (radio edit); 5:34 (Extended Mix)
- Label: Def Jam
- Songwriters: Alessandro Lindblad; Brandon Wronski; Mich Hansen; Lucas Secon; Damon Reinagle; Peter Wallevik; Daniel Heløy Davidsen
- Producer: Alesso

Alesso singles chronology
"Heroes (We Could Be)" (2014)	"Cool" (2015)	"Sweet Escape" (2015)

Roy English singles chronology
"Julianne" (2015)	"Cool" (2015)	"Tongue Tied July" (2015)

"Cool" is a 2015 song by Swedish DJ and record producer Alesso featuring vocals from American singer Roy English (also known by his real name Brandon Wronski), the frontman of the former American rock band Eye Alaska. It premiered on February 13, 2015 on BBC Radio 1. The track, which samples Kylie Minogue's "Get Outta My Way", was officially released in Europe on 16 February 2015 and in North America on 17 February 2015. The song was released on 26 April 2015 in the UK.

The cover art references his single "Tear The Roof Up" as the locker reads "Tear The Roof Up!"

== Music video ==
A music video for the song was commissioned. It was produced by Emil Nava, and was filmed at Venice High School, where the films Grease and American History X and the music video for Britney Spears' "...Baby One More Time", were filmed. Contrary to his anonymous DJ contemporaries, Alesso himself plays the protagonist, a long-haired, bespectacled nerd who is initially mocked by his fellow students but absconds to the dance class, where he encounters an attractive brunette teacher (Claude Racine) with whom he falls in love. About two-thirds of the way through the music video, his infatuation invokes amorous thoughts involving her dancing in a bra and knickers on a bench, a nod to the music video for Van Halen's "Hot for Teacher". These thoughts are interspersed with another man showing him how to dance properly using films containing dance moves. Alesso then uses a school dance to attract the teacher and then dump her with a smile in the middle of the dance floor.

== Critical reception ==
Krystal Spencer of Your EDM described the music video as "a riot to watch Alesso slide and spin through high school in the hopes of impressing his teacher", further commenting that "fans will love seeing a different side of Alesso".

== Track listings and formats ==
- Digital download - single
1. "Cool" (featuring Roy English) - 3:41
- Digital download - EP (Remixes)
1. "Cool" (Extended Version) - 5:33
2. "Cool" (A-Trak Remix) - 4:44
3. "Cool" (Autograf Remix) - 5:40
4. "Cool" (Sonny Alven Remix) - 3:47
5. "Cool" (CRNKN Remix) - 4:38
6. "Cool" (Sweater Beats Remix) - 3:26

== Charts ==
=== Weekly charts ===
Chart (2015)	Peak position
Belgium (Ultratip Bubbling Under Flanders)	19
Belgium (Ultratip Bubbling Under Wallonia)	16
Ireland (IRMA)	23
Scotland Singles (OCC)	4
Sweden (Sverigetopplistan)	59
UK Singles (OCC)	10
UK Dance (OCC)	3
US Hot Dance/Electronic Songs (Billboard)	14
US Dance Club Songs (Billboard)	2

=== Year-end charts ===
Chart (2015)	Position
US Hot Dance/Electronic Songs (Billboard)	38
US Dance Club Songs (Billboard)	26

== Certifications ==
Region	Certification	Certified units/sales
Brazil (Pro-Música Brasil)	Gold	30,000^{‡}
Sweden (GLF)	Platinum	40,000^{‡}
United Kingdom (BPI)	Silver	200,000^{‡}
^{‡} Sales+streaming figures based on certification alone.
