= Jean F. Cochois =

German music producer

Jean Frank Cochois, also known as The Timewriter, is a German house record producer.

== Background ==
His trademark style can be characterised by its dense and atmospheric sound. UK Muzik magazine wrote: "This is real 21st century soul music, overflowing with magic". Under various pseudonyms he has been releasing 12" and artist albums on labels as Plastic City, Mole Listening Pearls, Elektrolux and American labels such as Wave Music (record label), Driftwood, and Fiji. He amalgamates the deep soul of Motown with synthetic sound productions.

While still at boarding school, he eagerly explored the field of composition and became familiar with diverse musical styles. Cochois first entered the music scene in 1994 when he began working with label Plastic City, based in Mannheim. His debut 12" was released in 1995 on Plastic City. He looked up to bands like Depeche Mode, Tears for Fears, Kraftwerk, Gary Numan, Thomas Dolby, Alan Parsons, Vangelis and Jean Michele Jarre. Motown artists like Bobby Womack, Marvin Gaye or The Four Tops are also among his heroes. Other important sources of inspiration are Roxy Music and Marillion. In some of his songs influence of Michael Stearns is noticeable but he never confirmed this.

He has worked with artists such as Enigma, the ex-Kraftwerk member Wolfgang Flür (Yamo), Mike Oldfield, Yello, Faithless, and Boy George, to name a few.
