= Plastic City =

German record label located in Mannheim

Plastic City is a German record label located in Mannheim, founded in 1993. It has issued releases from various artists and DJs in tech house, including The Timewriter and Terry Lee Brown Junior, Marshall Jefferson, AWeX (Tom Wax), Steve Poindexter, Kriss Dior aka Bassface Sascha, David Alvarado, Andry Nalin (Nalin & Kane), Alexi Delano and G-Pal. Until 2003 the label was owned by UCMG. For a short time Holophon adopted the label, and since 2004 Plastic City has belonged to Daredo. Between 1995 and 2002 Plastic City was also located in London (Plastic City UK) and New York City (Plastic City America) with several individual single releases and its own repertoire (tribe) of artists. As a consequence of the September 11th terror attacks in 2001 and the fact that the New York location was in the neighbourhood of Ground Zero, label activities were stopped. At the time, Plastic City UK didn’t release any new albums either for a short period. Many artists from both sister labels affected at that time are now releasing directly on the mother label in Germany.

The musical responsibility for Plastic City was first held by Alexander Hendorf (A&R) and subsequently by Babak Shayan (2001-2002). Since 2004, Joachim Keil has assumed full responsibility for Plastic City, and since 2006 Alex Flatner has been responsible for artist management.

The most successful releases of Plastic City have been the Compilation series of Terry’s Café (1-12), Deep Train (1-6) as well as the albums of Terry Lee Brown Junior and The Timewriter. Since August 2008 there has been a weekly radio show at the Sonica Radio station Ibiza with Gorge featuring Plastic City artists.

== The Label Philosophy ==
Plastic City is a town, not made of stones and metal, but made of the thoughts of its listeners. This ethos is written in English on many Plastic City record covers from 1995 until the present. Plastic City therefore is something mystical; it is timeless and keeps up a constant flow. It is a town built by thoughts, where the inhabitants and their positions are indeterminate, as new dimensions are developing constantly and changes are taking place.

The releases of Plastic City are divided into so called "time ages" such as "Reconstructed" (1998 – 2002), "Maybe, Plastic City" (2003-2006) and "Imagination of the shape" (2006-today). In 2019, the artist Andreas Hachulla was commissioned to design covers for Plastic City and Plastic City Suburbia.
