= Tienditas Bridge =

Road bridge between Columbia and Venezuela

Tienditas International Bridge
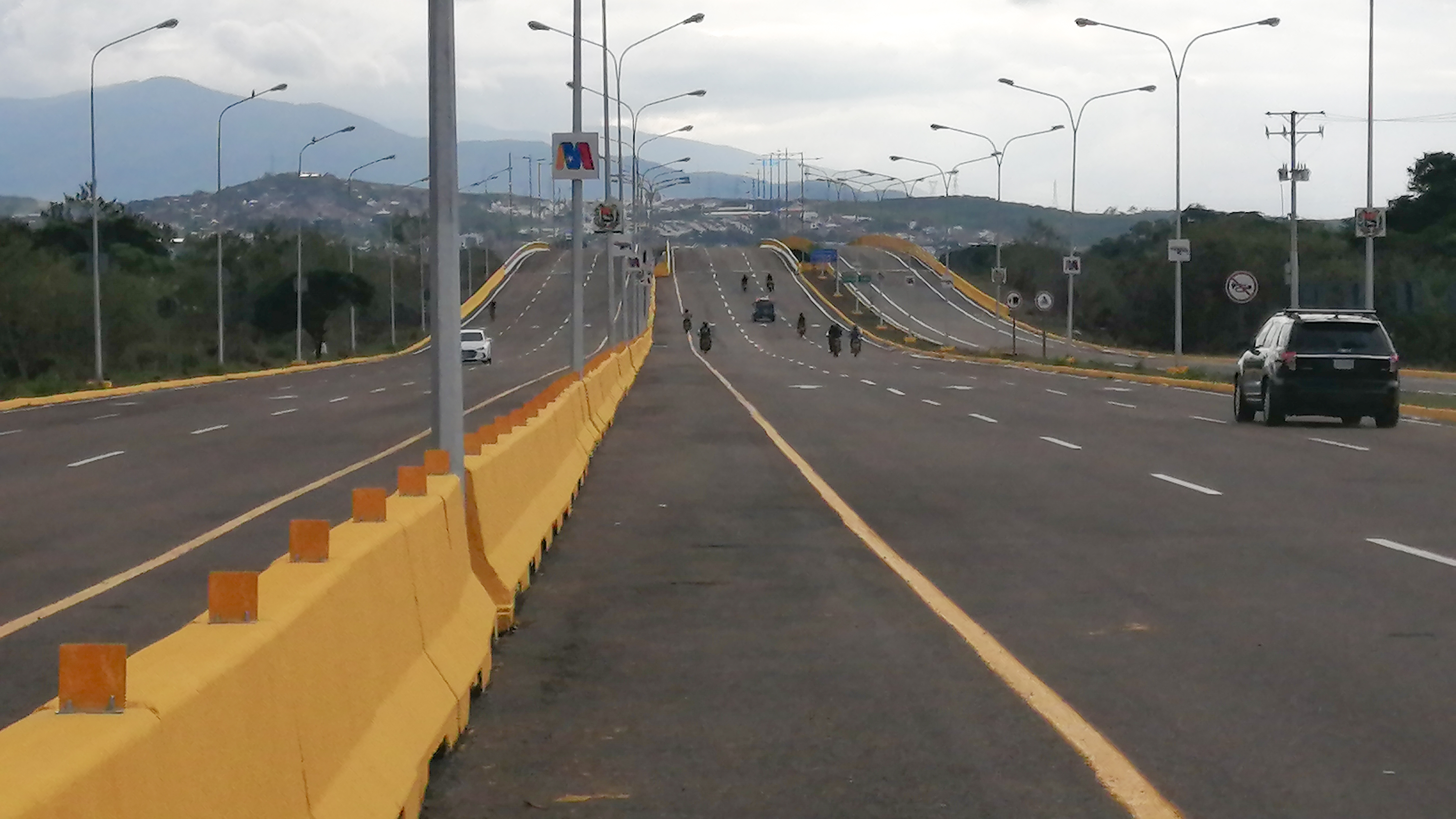
- Tienditas Bridge
- Coordinates: 7.876726°N 72.452541°W
- Carries: 6 divided lanes and pedestrians
- Crosses: Táchira River
- Locale: Táchira, Venezuela–Norte de Santander, Colombia
- Official name: Puente Internacional Tienditas

History
- Construction start: January 24, 2014
- Construction end: February 2016
- Opened: Not open

Statistics
- Daily traffic: 0 vehicles per day

Location
- Interactive map of Tienditas International Bridge

Tienditas International Bridge (Spanish: Puente Internacional Tienditas) is a vehicular and pedestrian bridge connecting Táchira, Venezuela with Norte de Santander, Colombia.

== History ==
The bridge's construction began on January 24, 2014 and was planned to take no longer than 20 months. The costs were estimated around $32,000,000 and was split equally between the Venezuelan and Colombian governments.

It is the fifth international bridge between the two countries. The bridge itself actually consists of three approximately 280-metre parallel bridges built over the Táchira River, two bridges with three lanes in each direction and a pedestrian bridge. Immigration and customs facilities are located on each side of the bridge.

The crossing was completed in February 2016, but due to tensions between Colombia and Venezuela since 2015 regarding smuggling, the bridge has not been opened to traffic.

=== Venezuela Aid Live ===
On February 22, 2019, a benefit concert was held on the Colombian side of the bridge to raise awareness and money towards humanitarian aid for Venezuela and to pressure for the reopening of the border so humanitarian aid could enter Venezuela. The Venezuelan government announced that it would also hold a concert on its side of the bridge, but it was later moved to a different location.
