= Forever (Alesso album) =

- Standard edition cover. On the deluxe edition, the text and logo are gold.

Studio album by Alesso
- Released: 22 May 2015
- Recorded: 2012–2015
- Genres: EDM; dance-pop
- Length: 49:31 (standard edition); 62:57 (deluxe edition)
- Labels: Def Jam; Virgin
- Producers: Alesso; Hal Ritson; Richard Adlam; Lotus IV; Calvin Harris; Benny Blanco; Ryan Tedder; Brent Kutzle; Matthew Koma

Singles from Forever
- 1. "If I Lose Myself" Released: 30 March 2013; 2. "City of Dreams" Released: 9 July 2013; 3. "Under Control" Released: 7 October 2013; 4. "Tear the Roof Up" Released: 30 July 2014; 5. "Heroes (We Could Be)" Released: 22 August 2014; 6. "Cool" Released: 17 February 2015; 7. "Sweet Escape" Released: 15 May 2015

Forever (stylised as FOREVER) is the debut studio album by Swedish DJ and record producer Alesso. It was released on 22 May 2015 by Def Jam Recordings. Alesso has said of the album, "It's been an indescribable journey to get this album together. I'm so proud of it, it's very personal to me, it's a dream to me that this has come together and I do what I love every single day. I hope my fans will enjoy it as much as I enjoyed making it and all the memories and emotions that went into every song. Thank you to everyone who helped me on this incredible journey and this is just the beginning."

== Critical reception ==
Professional ratings
Aggregate scores
Source	Rating
Metacritic	53/100
Review scores
Source	Rating
AllMusic	3.5/5 stars
PopMatters	3/10
Rolling Stone	3/5 stars

Forever received a score of 53 out of 100 on review aggregator Metacritic based on four critics' reviews, which the website categorized as "mixed or average" reception. David Jeffries of AllMusic described the album as versatile and opined that Alesso's use of "funky electro" distinguishes him from his competitors. Jeffries concluded his review by praising the opening track "Profondo", calling it "amusing, eerie and boomy".

Maura Johnston of the Boston Globe highlighted the track "Destinations" as the best on the album, while opining that Forever as a whole felt "incomplete". Colin Fitzgerald of PopMatters opined that the album felt more like a business move than a genuine creative endeavor from Alesso, singling out the track "Heroes (We Could Be)" for its unoriginality. Fitzgerald directed some praise towards the tracks "Payday" and "Destinations", but ultimately concluded his review by stating that the album contains "the worst of generic pop music – the kind that's existed for decades, just with a fresh new coat of EDM slapped on".

== Track listing ==
Forever – Standard edition
No.	Title	Writer(s)	Producer(s)	Length
1.	"Profondo"	Alessandro Lindblad	Alesso	2:19
2.	"Payday"	Lindblad	Alesso	3:17
3.	"Heroes (We Could Be)" (featuring Tove Lo)	Lindblad; Tove Nilsson; David Bowie; Brian Eno	Alesso	3:31
4.	"Tear the Roof Up"	Lindblad; Klas Åhlund; Adam Baptiste	Alesso	3:16
5.	"Cool" (featuring Roy English)	Lindblad; Damon Sharpe; Daniel Davidsen; Lucas Secon; Mich Hansen; Peter Wallevik	Alesso; Hal Ritson; Richard Adlam	3:42
6.	"Scars" (featuring Ryan Tedder)	Lindblad; Ryan Tedder	Alesso	3:18
7.	"Sweet Escape" (featuring Sirena)	Lindblad; Elsa Oljelund; Linus Wiklund	Alesso; Lotus IV^{[b]}	3:52
8.	"Destinations"	Lindblad	Alesso	5:29
9.	"If It Wasn't for You"	Lindblad; Simon Strömstedt	Alesso	3:52
10.	"In My Blood"	Lindblad; Michel Zitron; John Martin	Alesso	3:04
11.	"Under Control" (with Calvin Harris featuring Hurts)	Lindblad; Adam Wiles; Theo Hutchcraft	Alesso; Calvin Harris	3:05
12.	"All This Love" (featuring Noonie Bao)	Lindblad; Jonnali Parmenius; Wiklund; Måns Wredenberg	Alesso; Lotus IV^{[b]}	4:11
13.	"If I Lose Myself" (vs. OneRepublic)	Lindblad; Tedder; Benjamin Levin; Brent Kutzle; Zach Filkins	Alesso; Benny Blanco^{[a]}; Tedder^{[a]}; Kutzle^{[a]}	3:35
14.	"Immortale"	Lindblad	Alesso	3:11

Forever – deluxe edition (bonus tracks)
No.	Title	Writer(s)	Producer(s)	Length
15.	"Cool (Slow)" (featuring Roy English)	Lindblad; Sharpe; Davidsen; Secon; Hansen; Wallevik	Allesso; Ritson; Adlam	3:37
16.	"Gillionaire"	Lindblad	Alesso	6:40
17.	"Years" (featuring Matthew Koma)	Lindblad; Matthew Bair; Sam Watters	Alesso; Matthew Koma^{[a]}	3:15

Forever – British deluxe edition (iTunes)
No.	Title	Length
18.	"Heroes (We Could Be)" (featuring Tove Lo; main version video)	4:55
19.	"Cool" (featuring Roy English; revised main version video)	3:58

Forever – Japanese deluxe edition
No.	Title	Length
18.	"Cool" (featuring Roy English; A-Trak Remix)	4:44

Notes

- ^{^[a]} signifies a co-producer
- ^{^[b]} signifies an additional producer
- "If It Wasn't for You" features uncredited vocals by Simon Strömstedt.
- "In My Blood" features uncredited vocals by John Martin.
- "Cool" contains samples of Kylie Minogue's 2010 single "Get Outta My Way".
- The deluxe edition was available everywhere excluding North America.

== Charts ==
=== Weekly charts ===
Weekly chart performance for Forever
Chart (2015)	Peak position
Australian Albums (ARIA)	41
Austrian Albums (Ö3 Austria)	69
Belgian Albums (Ultratop Flanders)	43
Belgian Albums (Ultratop Wallonia)	78
Canadian Albums (Billboard)	18
Dutch Albums (Album Top 100)	54
Irish Albums (IRMA)	95
Italian Albums (FIMI)	32
Japanese Albums (Oricon)	27
Norwegian Albums (VG-lista)	33
Scottish Albums (Official Charts)	17
Spanish Albums (Promusicae)	65
Swedish Albums (Sverigetopplistan)	4
Swiss Albums (Schweizer Hitparade)	42
UK Albums (Official Charts)	24
UK Dance Albums (Official Charts)	5
US Billboard 200	30
US Top Dance Albums (Billboard)	1

=== Year-end charts ===
Year-end chart performance for Forever
Chart (2015)	Position
Swedish Albums (Sverigetopplistan)	68

== Certifications ==
Certifications for Forever
Region	Certification	Certified units/sales
Singapore (RIAS)	Gold	5,000^{*}
Sweden (GLF)	Gold	20,000^{‡}
United Kingdom (BPI)	Gold	400,000^{‡}
United States (RIAA)	Gold	500,000^{‡}
^{*} Sales figures based on certification alone.^{‡} Sales+streaming figures based on certification alone.
