= Heroes (We Could Be) =

Single by Alesso featuring Tove Lo

from the album Forever
- Released: 22 August 2014
- Recorded: 2012–2014
- Genre: Progressive house
- Length: 3:30 (Radio Edit); 5:39 (Extended Mix)
- Label: Def Jam
- Songwriters: Alessandro Lindblad; Ebba Nilsson; David Jones; Brian Eno
- Producer: Alesso

Alesso singles chronology
| "Tear the Roof Up" (2014) | "Heroes (We Could Be)" (2014) | "Cool" (2015) |

Tove Lo singles chronology
| "Stay High" (2014) | "Heroes (We Could Be)" (2014) | "Talking Body" (2015) |

Music video
- "Heroes" on YouTube

"Heroes (We Could Be)" is a song by Swedish DJ and record producer Alesso, featuring the vocals of Swedish singer-songwriter Tove Lo. Released on 22 August 2014, the song has charted in a number of countries. In the US, the song went to number one on the dance chart.

== Background ==
In an interview with Billboard, Alesso explained the song: "When Tove Lo and I first started working together, she'd tell me about how she wanted to be different, to stand out as an artist. And on some level, I think everyone goes through that. As a teenager, I was always wondering about who I was, what was my identity, did I secretly wish I was someone else. But as you [age], you realize that it's not about being someone else." When asked what inspired the song's lyrics, he continued, "My team and I reached out to [Lo] to see if she'd be interested in a collaboration, and a couple months later, we began writing the lyrics that would go over these instrumentals. We discussed what it should be about—we knew it should be an emotional record—and this gorgeous girl came back with this gorgeous topline."

Even though the song's melody bears no similarity to David Bowie's 1977 single " 'Heroes' ", his and Brian Eno's names were added to the song's writing credits in July 2015. Alesso told the Daily Star: "I just didn't want to get sued. They aren't similar, but we needed protection in case we pissed off Bowie."

Alesso played this song at the 2023 UEFA Champions League final.

== Music video ==
The music video was released on 10 October 2014. Similar to the 2006 TV series of the same name, it introduces teenagers with supernatural abilities, who are detained in a high security institute. An angel, portrayed by Tove Lo, is being kept under strict supervision as scientists compel her to swallow drugs designed to remove her powers. Meanwhile, Alesso runs toward and enters the facility and to release the angelic woman. As he walks past the superhuman teens, they exhibit their abilities and break free. This triggers an alarm, allowing him and the woman to escape from the scientists. As they approach the top of the building, they decide to fall. As they fall, the angel flies away. However, Alesso falls on a car and perishes. The final scene involves the teens escaping into the night.

== Charts ==
=== Weekly charts ===
Weekly chart performance
| Chart (2014–2015) | Peak position |
|---|---|
| Australia (ARIA) | 11 |
| Austria (Ö3 Austria Top 40) | 41 |
| Belgium (Ultratop 50 Flanders) | 28 |
| Belgium (Ultratop 50 Wallonia) | 34 |
| Canada Hot 100 (Billboard) | 51 |
| Czech Republic Airplay (ČNS IFPI) | 15 |
| Denmark (Tracklisten) | 26 |
| Finland Airplay (Radiosoittolista) | 11 |
| France (SNEP) | 44 |
| Germany (GfK) | 71 |
| Hungary (Dance Top 40) | 15 |
| Hungary (Rádiós Top 40) | 2 |
| Hungary (Single Top 40) | 12 |
| Ireland (IRMA) | 6 |
| Italy (FIMI) | 30 |
| Mexico Anglo (Monitor Latino) | 9 |
| Netherlands (Dutch Top 40) | 10 |
| Netherlands (Single Top 100) | 18 |
| New Zealand (Recorded Music NZ) | 15 |
| Norway (VG-lista) | 11 |
| Poland Airplay (ZPAV) | 7 |
| Poland Dance (ZPAV) | 20 |
| Romania (Airplay 100) | 66 |
| Russia Airplay (TopHit) | 10 |
| Scottish Singles Sales (Official Charts) | 3 |
| Slovenia (SloTop50) | 35 |
| Spain (Promusicae) | 24 |
| Sweden (Sverigetopplistan) | 5 |
| Switzerland (Schweizer Hitparade) | 47 |
| UK Singles (Official Charts) | 6 |
| UK Dance (Official Charts) | 1 |
| Ukraine Airplay (TopHit) | 23 |
| US Billboard Hot 100 | 31 |
| US Adult Pop Airplay (Billboard) | 27 |
| US Dance Club Songs (Billboard) | 1 |
| US Hot Dance/Electronic Songs (Billboard) | 2 |
| US Pop Airplay (Billboard) | 11 |
| US Rhythmic Airplay (Billboard) | 34 |

=== Year-end charts ===
Annual chart rankings
| Chart (2014) | Position |
|---|---|
| Australia (ARIA) | 94 |
| Netherlands (Dutch Top 40) | 59 |
| Netherlands (Single Top 100) | 73 |
| Russia Airplay (TopHit) | 139 |
| Sweden (Sverigetopplistan) | 63 |
| US Hot Dance/Electronic Songs (Billboard) | 27 |
| Chart (2015) | Position |
| France (SNEP) | 172 |
| Hungary (Dance Top 40) | 35 |
| Hungary (Rádiós Top 40) | 31 |
| Hungary (Single Top 40) | 86 |
| Netherlands (Single Top 100) | 89 |
| Spain (PROMUSICAE) | 90 |
| Sweden (Sverigetopplistan) | 100 |
| UK Singles (Official Charts Company) | 50 |
| US Dance Club Songs (Billboard) | 45 |
| US Hot Dance/Electronic Songs (Billboard) | 12 |
| Chart (2018) | Position |
| Hungary (Rádiós Top 40) | 68 |

=== Decade-end charts ===
Decennium chart rankings
| Chart (2010–2019) | Position |
|---|---|
| US Hot Dance/Electronic Songs (Billboard) | 50 |

== Certifications ==
Certifications and sales
| Region | Certification | Certified units/sales |
|---|---|---|
| Australia (ARIA) | Platinum | 70,000^{^} |
| Brazil (Pro-Música Brasil) | 3× Platinum | 180,000^{‡} |
| Canada (Music Canada) | Gold | 40,000^{*} |
| Denmark (IFPI Danmark) | Platinum | 60,000^{^} |
| Germany (BVMI) | Gold | 200,000^{‡} |
| Italy (FIMI) | Platinum | 50,000^{‡} |
| New Zealand (RMNZ) | 2× Platinum | 60,000^{‡} |
| Portugal (AFP) | Gold | 10,000^{‡} |
| Spain (Promusicae) | Platinum | 40,000^{‡} |
| Sweden (GLF) | 4× Platinum | 160,000^{‡} |
| United Kingdom (BPI) | 2× Platinum | 1,200,000^{‡} |
| United States (RIAA) | 2× Platinum | 2,000,000^{‡} |
^{*} Sales figures based on certification alone.^{^} Shipments figures based on certification alone.^{‡} Sales+streaming figures based on certification alone.

== Release history ==
Release dates and formats for "Heroes (We Could Be)"
| Region | Date | Format | Label(s) | Ref. |
|---|---|---|---|---|
| United States | 9 September 2014 | Mainstream airplay | Def Jam | |

== See also ==
- List of number-one dance singles of 2014 (U.S.)
