= Yellow & Elephant =

EP by Eye Alaska
- Released: June 17, 2008
- Genre: Alternative rock
- Length: 22:03
- Label: Fearless Records

Eye Alaska chronology
Yellow & Elephant (2008)	Genesis Underground (2009)

Professional ratings
Review scores
Source	Rating
AbsolutePunk	(91%)

Yellow & Elephant is the debut EP by American Alternative band Eye Alaska, released on June 17, 2008 through Fearless Records.

== Track listing ==
No.	Title	Length
1.	"I Knew You'd Never Fly"	4:09
2.	"Stop Me Now, I'm Not Ready"	3:39
3.	"Roll Right Over"	3:44
4.	"Through Willows And Streams"	4:30
5.	"A Storm In The Childs Fountain"	3:12
6.	"Cheetah And The Tiger"	2:54
