= Eye Alaska =

American rock band

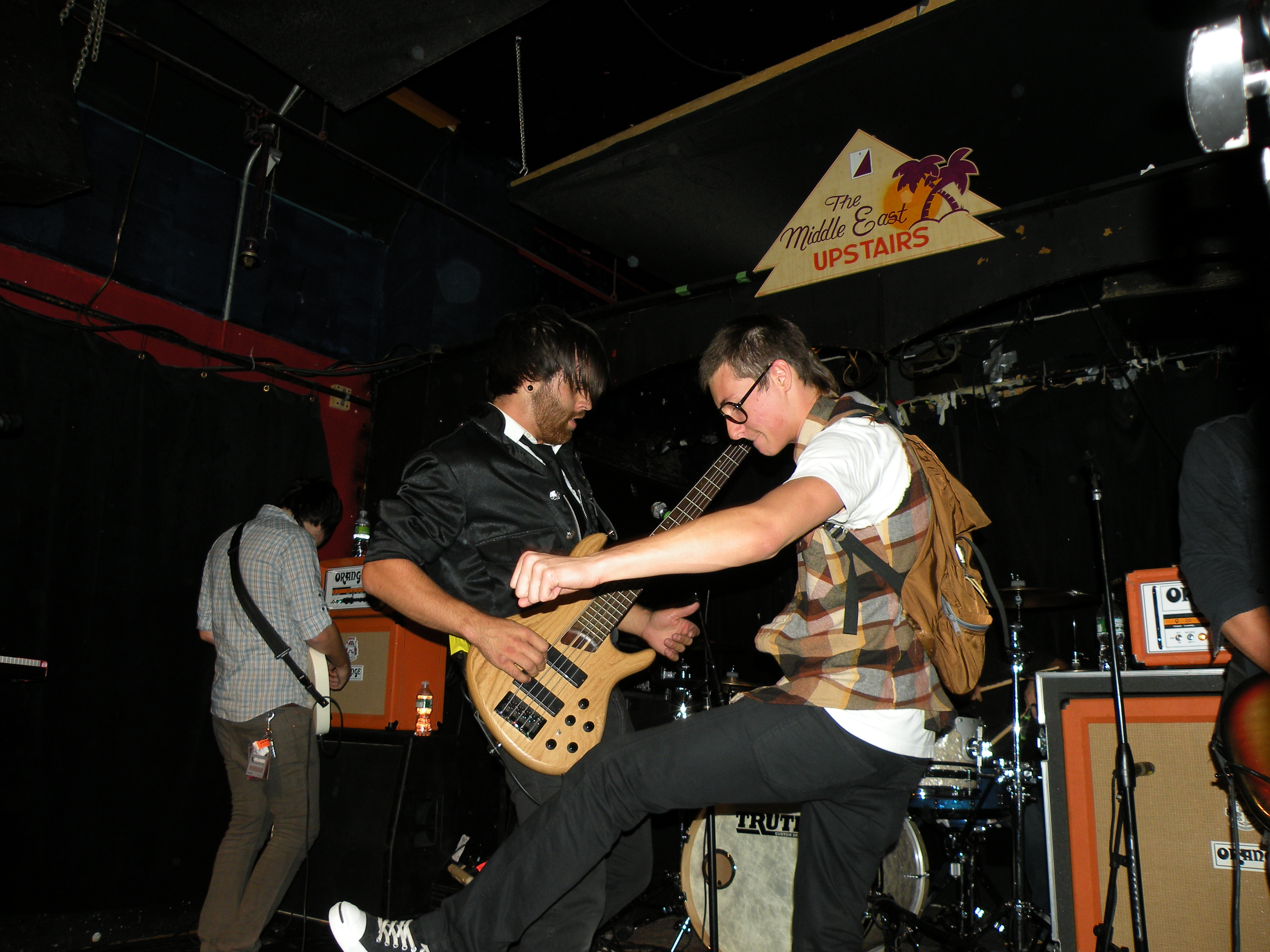
- Eye Alaska performing at the Middle East Upstairs in Cambridge, Massachusetts while touring with VersaEmerge

Background information
- Origin: Orange County, California, United States
- Genres: Alternative rock, post-hardcore
- Years active: 2006–2011
- Labels: Fearless
- Past members: Roy English; Cameron Trowbridge; Christopher Osegueda; Chase Kensrue; Han Ko
- Website: Eye Alaska at MySpace

Eye Alaska was an American rock band from Orange County, California, formed in 2006. Two members, Brandon Wronski and Cameron Trowbridge, were former members of Dead Letter Diaries.

Eye Alaska signed to Fearless Records in February 2008, and released their debut EP titled Yellow & Elephant shortly after. They released their debut full-length album, Genesis Underground, on July 7, 2009. Genesis Underground reached No. 38 on the Billboard Top Heatseekers chart.

The band announced via Facebook on September 23, 2011 that they are to cease their existence as Eye Alaska and move on, as individuals, into other areas, not exclusively in music.

== Personnel ==
- Roy English – lead vocals, guitar, piano, programming
- Cameron Trowbridge – guitar, backing vocals
- Christopher Osegueda – bass, backing vocals
- Chase Kensrue – guitar, piano, backing vocals
- Han Ko – drums

== Discography ==
=== Studio albums ===
Year	Album	Label	Chart Positions		
Year	Album	Label	US	US Indie	US Heat
2009	Genesis Underground	Fearless Records	—	—	38
"—" denotes a release that did not chart.

=== Extended plays ===
- 2008: Yellow & Elephant
