= Sweet Escape =

2015 song by Alesso

Single by Alesso feat. Sirena

from the album Forever
- Released: 15 May 2015
- Genre: Progressive house
- Length: 3:52
- Label: Virgin EMI
- Songwriter(s): Alessandro Lindblad; Elsa Oljelund; Linus Wiklund
- Producer(s): Alesso; Lotus IV

Alesso singles chronology
"Cool" (2015)	"Sweet Escape" (2015)	"This Summer" (2015)

Music video
- "Sweet Escape" on YouTube

"Sweet Escape" is a song by Swedish DJ and record producer Alesso featuring Swedish singer-songwriter Sirena. It was released on 15 May 2015. The song written by Alesso, Elsa Oljelund and Lotus IV, produced by Alesso and Lotus IV.

== Background ==
The song was first performed during Ultra Music Festival in 2014, and has been a major track at Alesso live sets ever since.

== Composition ==
The song with soft violin sounds as Sirena energetic vocals and into a blissful mix of uplifting and sensational synth.

== Charts ==
=== Weekly charts ===
Chart (2015)	Peak position
Belgium (Ultratip Bubbling Under Flanders)	2
Belgium Dance (Ultratop Flanders)	28
Sweden (Sverigetopplistan)	87
UK Singles (OCC)	189
US Dance Club Songs (Billboard)	12
US Hot Dance/Electronic Songs (Billboard)	26

=== Year-end charts ===
Chart (2015)	Position
US Hot Dance/Electronic Songs (Billboard)	91
