= City of Dreams (Dirty South and Alesso song) =

Single by Dirty South and Alesso featuring Ruben Haze

from the album Forever
- Released: 9 July 2013
- Recorded: 2012
- Genre: Progressive house
- Length: 3:46
- Label: Phazing; Astralwerks
- Songwriters: Dragan Roganovic; Alessandro Lindblad
- Producers: Dirty South; Alesso

Dirty South singles chronology
"Halo" (2013)	"City of Dreams" (2013)	"Until the End" (2013)

Alesso singles chronology
"If I Lose Myself" (2013)	"City of Dreams" (2013)	"Under Control" (2013)

"City of Dreams" is a 2013 song recorded by Australian DJ and record producer Dirty South and Swedish DJ and producer Alesso. It features vocals from Ruben Haze.

== Composition ==
City of Dreams is a progressive house song set in the key of E major with a tempo of 128 beats per minute.

== Track listing ==
- Digital download
1. "City of Dreams (Radio Edit)" – 3:46
2. "City of Dreams (Original Mix)" - 6:45
3. "City of Dreams (Jacques Lu Cont Remix)" - 5:28
4. "City of Dreams (Showtek Remix)" - 5:17

== Charts ==
=== Weekly charts ===
Chart (2013)	Peak position
Belgium Dance (Ultratop Flanders)	28
Belgium (Ultratip Bubbling Under Flanders)	36
US Dance Club Songs (Billboard)	13
US Hot Dance/Electronic Songs (Billboard)	28

=== Year-end charts ===
Chart (2013)	Position
US Hot Dance/Electronic Songs (Billboard)	76
