= Under Control (Calvin Harris and Alesso song) =

2013 single by Calvin Harris and Alesso

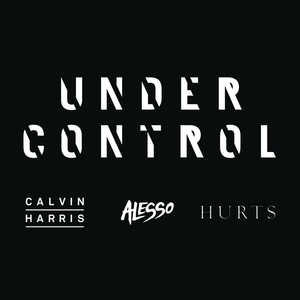

Single by Calvin Harris and Alesso featuring Hurts

from the album Motion and Forever
- Released: 7 October 2013
- Recorded: 2013
- Studio: EMI, London; Fly Eye, London; Alesso, Stockholm
- Length: 3:04
- Label: Deconstruction; Fly Eye; Columbia
- Songwriters: Calvin Harris; Alessandro Lindblad; Theo Hutchcraft
- Producers: Calvin Harris; Alesso

Calvin Harris singles chronology
"Thinking About You" (2013)	"Under Control" (2013)	"Summer" (2014)

Alesso singles chronology
"City of Dreams" (2013)	"Under Control" (2013)	"Tear the Roof Up" (2014)

Hurts singles chronology
"Somebody to Die For" (2013)	"Under Control" (2013)	"Some Kind of Heaven" (2015)

Music video
- "Under Control" on YouTube

"Under Control" is a song recorded by Scottish DJ Calvin Harris and Swedish DJ Alesso, featuring vocals from Theo Hutchcraft, credited to his duo Hurts. The song was released on 7 October 2013 as the first single from Harris's fourth studio album, Motion (2014), and the second single from Alesso's debut studio album, Forever (2015).

"Under Control" debuted at number one on the UK Singles Chart with first-week sales of 74,704 copies, becoming Harris's fifth number-one single, and the first for Alesso and Hurts.

== Background ==
"Under Control" was premiered on 2 August 2013 during a DJ set by Alesso at Ushuaia, Ibiza, which was broadcast by BBC Radio 1. Harris performed the song at the end of his set at the V Festival on 20 August. On 18 September, Harris posted a preview of the song on SoundCloud. The cover was unveiled on Alesso's Twitter page on 4 October.

== Music video ==
On 9 September 2013, Harris stated on Facebook that 1,000 fans would take a part in the music video shoot. Later a message was reposted by Alesso and Theo Hutchcraft from Hurts in a blog on Twitter. The video was shot in Los Angeles on 10 and 11 September. On the second day of the shoot, already with the fans, filming was held at the 6th Street Bridge, for an EDM concert held by the song's artists celebrating the end of the world. The world didn't actually end in the video because the meteor failed to hit the Earth.

== Track listings ==
Digital download
No.	Title	Length
1.	"Under Control"	3:04

Digital download – Extended Mix
No.	Title	Length
1.	"Under Control" (Extended Mix)	5:36

German CD single
No.	Title	Length
1.	"Under Control"	3:04
2.	"Under Control" (Extended Mix)	5:36

== Personnel ==
Credits adapted from CD single liner notes.

- Alesso – all instruments, engineering, mixing, production, songwriting
- Calvin Harris – all instruments, engineering, mixing, production, songwriting
- Theo Hutchcraft – vocals, songwriting
- Mike Marsh – mastering

== Charts and certifications ==
=== Weekly charts ===
Weekly chart performance
Chart (2013–2014)	Peak position
Australia (ARIA)	17
Australia Dance (ARIA)	6
Austria (Ö3 Austria Top 40)	21
Belgium (Ultratop 50 Flanders)	42
Belgium Dance (Ultratop Flanders)	14
Belgium (Ultratip Bubbling Under Wallonia)	2
Belgium Dance (Ultratop Wallonia)	11
Canada Hot 100 (Billboard)	82
CIS Airplay (TopHit)	5
Czech Republic Airplay (ČNS IFPI)	7
Czech Republic Singles Digital (ČNS IFPI)	32
Denmark (Tracklisten)	28
Euro Digital Song Sales (Billboard)	2
Finland (Suomen virallinen lista)	5
Finland Airplay (Radiosoittolista)	7
France (SNEP)	55
Germany (GfK)	24
Hungary (Dance Top 40)	2
Hungary (Rádiós Top 40)	33
Hungary (Single Top 40)	5
Ireland (IRMA)	5
Italy (Musica e Dischi)	36
Netherlands (Dutch Tipparade 40)	2
Netherlands (Single Top 100)	59
Netherlands (Dutch Dance Top 30)	12
New Zealand (Recorded Music NZ)	31
Norway (VG-lista)	9
Poland Airplay (ZPAV)	7
Poland (Polish Airplay TV)	3
Poland Dance (ZPAV)	13
Russia Airplay (TopHit)	4
Scotland Singles (Official Charts)	1
Slovakia Airplay (ČNS IFPI)	15
Slovakia Singles Digital (ČNS IFPI)	89
Slovenia (SloTop50)	23
Sweden (Sverigetopplistan)	8
Switzerland (Schweizer Hitparade)	34
Ukraine Airplay (TopHit)	24
UK Singles (Official Charts)	1
UK Dance (Official Charts)	1
US Bubbling Under Hot 100 (Billboard)	3
US Hot Dance/Electronic Songs (Billboard)	12

=== Year-end charts ===
2013 year-end chart performance
Chart (2013)	Position
Australia Dance (ARIA)	33
Belgium Dance (Ultratop Wallonia)	98
Hungary (Dance Top 40)	55
Russia Airplay (TopHit)	171
UK Singles (OCC)	114
US Hot Dance/Electronic Songs (Billboard)	90

2014 year-end chart performance
Chart (2014)	Position
Belgium Dance (Ultratop Flanders)	91
Belgium Dance (Ultratop Wallonia)	85
Hungary (Dance Top 40)	5
Hungary (Single Top 40)	72
Italy (FIMI)	94
Russia Airplay (TopHit)	54
Sweden (Sverigetopplistan)	83
US Hot Dance/Electronic Songs (Billboard)	56

=== Certifications ===
Certifications and sales
Region	Certification	Certified units/sales
Australia (ARIA)	2× Platinum	140,000^{‡}
Brazil (Pro-Música Brasil)	3× Platinum	180,000^{‡}
Canada (Music Canada)	Platinum	80,000^{‡}
Germany (BVMI)	Gold	150,000^{^}
Italy (FIMI)	Platinum	30,000^{‡}
Mexico (AMPROFON)	Gold	30,000^{*}
New Zealand (RMNZ)	Platinum	30,000^{‡}
Norway (IFPI Norway)	2× Platinum	20,000^{‡}
Portugal (AFP)	Gold	10,000^{‡}
Spain (Promusicae)	Gold	30,000^{‡}
Sweden (GLF)	2× Platinum	80,000^{‡}
Switzerland (IFPI Switzerland)	Gold	15,000^{^}
United Kingdom (BPI)	Platinum	393,762
United States (RIAA)	Platinum	1,000,000^{‡}
Streaming
Denmark (IFPI Danmark)	Platinum	1,800,000^{†}
^{*} Sales figures based on certification alone.^{^} Shipments figures based on certification alone.^{‡} Sales+streaming figures based on certification alone.^{†} Streaming-only figures based on certification alone.

== Release history ==
Release dates
Region	Date	Format(s)	Label	Ref.
France	7 October 2013	Digital download	Sony	
Sweden	7 October 2013	Digital download	Sony	
Australia	11 October 2013	Digital download	Sony	
United States	22 October 2013	Digital download	Columbia	
United Kingdom	30 October 2013	Contemporary hit radio	Deconstruction; Fly Eye; Columbia	
Germany	15 November 2013	Digital download	Sony	
Ireland	22 November 2013	Digital download	Deconstruction; Fly Eye; Columbia	
United Kingdom	24 November 2013	Digital download	Deconstruction; Fly Eye; Columbia	
Germany	3 January 2014	CD single	Sony	
