= If I Lose Myself =

2013 single by OneRepublic

Single by OneRepublic

from the album Native
- Released: January 8, 2013
- Recorded: 2012
- Length: 4:01
- Label: Mosley; Interscope
- Songwriters: Ryan Tedder; Brent Kutzle; Zach Filkins; Benjamin Levin
- Producers: Ryan Tedder; Benny Blanco; Brent Kutzle

OneRepublic singles chronology
"Feel Again" (2012)	"If I Lose Myself" (2013)	"Counting Stars" (2013)

Music video
- "If I Lose Myself" on YouTube

"If I Lose Myself" is a song recorded by American pop rock band OneRepublic for their third studio album, Native (2013). It was released as the album's first official single on January 8, 2013. The song was written by Ryan Tedder, Benny Blanco, Brent Kutzle and Zach Filkins. It was produced by Tedder and Blanco while Kutzle served as the co-producer. The song peaked at number 74 on the US Billboard Hot 100 and number 6 on the Media Control Charts in Germany. In early 2014, the single was re-released in the UK after the huge success of "Counting Stars".

== Writing and inspiration ==
OneRepublic frontman Ryan Tedder told Billboard about the song's lyrics: "It's actually about my buried, latent fear of flying and going down in an airplane, having that moment of sheer panic, looking out the window, seeing your life pass before you and somehow finding comfort in the fact that the person next to you is experiencing the same traumatic event."

== Composition ==
"If I Lose Myself" (2013)
A 24 second sample of "If I Lose Myself".

"If I Lose Myself" runs for 4:01 minutes and has a tempo of 140 beats per minute.

== Live performances ==
On March 28, 2013, OneRepublic performed "If I Lose Myself" on American Idol with former Idol contestant and NBC Smash star Katharine McPhee. They also performed on Good Morning America, The Ellen Degeneres Show and Rachael Ray, as well as several other concerts and festivals.

== Music video ==
In an interview with fuse.tv, Tedder said, "The original concept [for the video] was borrowing from the opening scene of Garden State—the plane's going down and all the oxygen masks drop out and everyone's going crazy... We chased that for a minute but realized... It's one thing to watch that kind of video once, but you don't wanna sit there and hit repeat on watching a plane crash."

The music video was released on January 24, 2013. In the video, a group of people are sent a text from Tedder, of a picture of a wolf and the numbers 11.11.11 at the bottom. The camera follows the group around the city chasing clues that are spray painted on fire hydrants and street signs around the town that will help them guide their way to a secret concert that OneRepublic is holding. The video cuts to scenes of the band performing the song in a dark, smokey room with colored lights surrounding the room with a bunch of fans dancing. There are pictures of owls and foxes being projected around the room which are allusions to the album cover for Native. At the end of the video, there is a fox being projected on Tedder's face. The video was inspired by the movies 12 Monkeys and The Matrix.

The video has over 123 million views as of November 2025. It is one of the top ten most viewed OneRepublic music videos.

== Track listing ==
- Digital download
1. "If I Lose Myself" – 4:01
- Digital download – remix
1. "If I Lose Myself" (OneRepublic vs Alesso) – 3:34
- CD single
1. "If I Lose Myself" (Album version) – 4:01
2. "If I Lose Myself" (Love Thy Brother remix) – 4:03

== Credits and personnel ==
Recording

- Recorded at Black Rock Studios, Santorini, Greece; The Warehouse Studio, Vancouver, British Columbia; Lotzah Matzah Studios, New York City, New York; Patriot Studios, Denver, Colorado; Downtown Studios, New York City, New York; Orion Studio, Orange County, California
- Mixed at MixStar Studios, Virginia Beach, Virginia
- Mastered at Sterling Sound, New York

Personnel

- Songwriting – Ryan Tedder, Benny Blanco, Brent Kutzle, Zach Filkins
- Production – Benny Blanco, Ryan Tedder
- Co-production – Brent Kutzle
- Mixing – Serban Ghenea
- Engineering – Smith Carlson, Ryan Tedder
- Assistant engineering – Scott "Yarmov" Yarmovsky, Chris Sclafani, Matthew Tryba
- Backing vocals – Zach Filkins, Drew Brown, Eddie Fisher, Brent Kutzle, David McGlohon
- Instrumentation and programming – Benny Blanco, Ryan Tedder, Brent Kutzle, OneRepublic
- Mix engineering – John Hanes
- Assistant mix engineering – Phil Seaford
- Mastering – Chris Gehringer, Will Quinnell

== Charts ==
=== Weekly charts ===
Weekly chart performance for "If I Lose Myself"
Chart (2013–14)	Peak position
Australia (ARIA)	14
Austria (Ö3 Austria Top 40)	5
Belgium (Ultratop 50 Flanders)	46
Belgium (Ultratip Bubbling Under Wallonia)	10
Canada Hot 100 (Billboard)	41
Czech Republic Airplay (ČNS IFPI)	57
France (SNEP)	186
Germany (GfK)	6
Italy (FIMI)	41
Luxembourg (Billboard)	9
New Zealand (Recorded Music NZ)	18
Poland Dance (ZPAV)	29
Russia Airplay (TopHit)	18
Slovakia Airplay (ČNS IFPI)	3
Slovakia Singles Digital (ČNS IFPI)	95
Spain (Promusicae)	44
Sweden (Sverigetopplistan)	4
Switzerland (Schweizer Hitparade)	9
Ukraine Airplay (TopHit)	70
US Billboard Hot 100	74
US Adult Pop Airplay (Billboard)	23
US Dance Airplay (Billboard)	10
US Dance Club Songs (Billboard)	49
US Pop Airplay (Billboard)	34

=== Year-end charts ===
2013 year-end chart performance for "If I Lose Myself"
Chart (2013)	Position
Austria (Ö3 Austria Top 40)	67
Germany (Media Control AG)	56
Russia Airplay (TopHit)	173
Sweden (Sverigetopplistan)	20
US Dance/Mix Show Airplay (Billboard)	30

2014 year-end chart performance for "If I Lose Myself"
Chart (2014)	Position
Russia Airplay (TopHit)	91

== Certifications ==
Certifications for "If I Lose Myself"
Region	Certification	Certified units/sales
Australia (ARIA)	3× Platinum	210,000^{‡}
Austria (IFPI Austria)	Platinum	30,000^{*}
Brazil (Pro-Música Brasil)	2× Platinum	120,000^{‡}
Canada (Music Canada)	Gold	40,000^{*}
Germany (BVMI)	3× Gold	450,000^{‡}
Italy (FIMI)	Platinum	50,000^{‡}
New Zealand (RMNZ)	2× Platinum	60,000^{‡}
Spain (Promusicae)	Platinum	60,000^{‡}
Switzerland (IFPI Switzerland)	Gold	15,000^{‡}
Streaming
Denmark (IFPI Danmark)	Gold	900,000^{†}
^{*} Sales figures based on certification alone.^{‡} Sales+streaming figures based on certification alone.^{†} Streaming-only figures based on certification alone.

== Release history ==
Release dates and formats for "If I Lose Myself"
Region	Date	Format	Label	Ref.
United States	January 29, 2013	Mainstream airplay	Interscope	
Italy	February 8, 2013	Radio impact	Universal	
Germany	February 28, 2013	CD single	Universal	

== Alesso vs. OneRepublic version ==
"If I Lose Myself"

Single by Alesso vs. OneRepublic

from the album Forever
- Released: March 30, 2013
- Genre: Progressive house
- Length: 3:34 (album version); 5:54 (original Alesso remix); 6:52 (extended Alesso remix)
- Label: Mosley; Interscope
- Songwriters: Ryan Tedder; Brent Kutzle; Zach Filkins; Benny Blanco
- Producer: Alesso

Alesso singles chronology
"Years" (2013)	"If I Lose Myself" (2013)	"City of Dreams" (2013)

A progressive house version of the song remixed by Swedish producer Alesso was played for the first time at the Ultra Music Festival in Miami, Florida on March 24, 2013, and was released in certain countries on March 30, notably Netherlands and Sweden, charting with a version credited to Alesso vs. OneRepublic. "If I Lose Myself" was promoted and released in the United Kingdom and Australia in February 2014. This remix was later featured on both the UK and US reissue of the group's album, Native, as well as Alesso's debut album, Forever (2015).

The remix was nominated for a Grammy Award in the category Best Remixed Recording, Non-Classical. Alesso explained:

I haven’t been this happy about a remix I’ve done since "Pressure". I feel like I’ve got everything I want in this record, all what I could wish for musically. I do like the original and I wanted a kick that would preserve the ‘live’ feeling energy you get when you listen to it. I worked on it for like a month, going to the studio everyday, wondering what I was going to do, going backward, forward, trying different beats and drums and basslines, everything. I had an idea but didn’t really know how to make it sound the way I wanted. Then I thought, I’m not going to mess around for ages, I want to give it to them straight away. Sometimes people give just a preview, and you never know when it's coming out. This time I wanted to hear their thoughts immediately because I felt so excited by the record.

=== Track listing ===
- Digital download
1. "If I Lose Myself" (Alesso vs. OneRepublic) – 3:34
- Digital download — extended remix
1. "If I Lose Myself" (Alesso vs. OneRepublic) (extended remix) – 7:08

=== Charts ===
Chart (2013–2014)	Peak position
Netherlands (Single Top 100)	89
Ireland (IRMA)	14
Scottish Singles Sales (Official Charts)	6
UK Dance (Official Charts)	4
UK Singles (Official Charts)	8

=== Certifications ===
Region	Certification	Certified units/sales
Sweden (GLF)	4× Platinum	160,000^{‡}
United Kingdom (BPI)	Platinum	600,000^{‡}
United States (RIAA)	2× Platinum	2,000,000^{‡}
^{‡} Sales+streaming figures based on certification alone.
