= Alesso =

Swedish DJ and producer (born 1991)

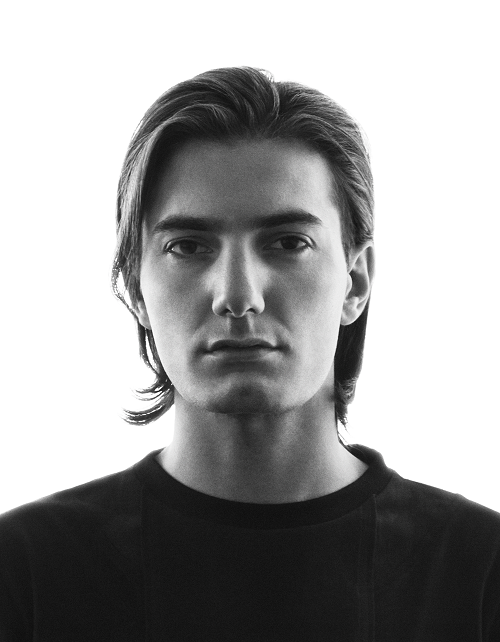
- Alesso in 2014

Background information
- Born: Alessandro Renato Rodolfo Lindblad; 7 July 1991 (age 35); Stockholm, Sweden
- Genres: Progressive house; pop
- Occupations: DJ; remixer; record producer
- Years active: 2010–present
- Labels: Refune; Joia; Ministry of Sound; Universal Sweden; Def Jam; Virgin EMI; 10:22PM; Astralwerks; Geffen
- Website: alessoworld.com

Alessandro Renato Rodolfo Lindblad (born 7 July 1991), better known by his stage name Alesso (Italian pronunciation: [aˈlɛsso]), is a Swedish DJ, remixer, and record producer.

He has worked with numerous artists, including Swedish House Mafia, Martin Garrix, Tove Lo, Theo Hutchcraft, OneRepublic, Hailee Steinfeld, Calvin Harris, Katy Perry, Anitta, Usher, Zara Larsson, David Guetta, Liam Payne, Ty Dolla Sign, TINI, and Stray Kids. He has performed at numerous music festivals, including Coachella, Electric Daisy Carnival, Creamfields, Tomorrowland, and Ultra Music Festival. In 2012, MTV named Alesso one of the "EDM Rookies to Watch" and Madonna, who invited him to open select dates on her MDNA Tour, called Alesso "the next big thing in dance music."

He was ranked 13th on DJ Magazine's 2015 list of the top 100 DJs and number 20th in year 2016 on DJ Magazine among the list of Top 100 DJs in the world. His debut full-length album Forever was released in 2015 by Def Jam Recordings.

== Early life ==
Lindblad was born in Stockholm, and is of Swedish and Italian descent. He started playing piano at age 7, but became interested in electronic dance music when he was 16.

== Music career ==
=== Pre-2013: Career beginnings ===
He first gained recognition with the release of his Alesso EP in 2010. In early 2011, Sebastian Ingrosso of Swedish House Mafia contacted Alesso and asked if he wanted to work together. Ingrosso introduced him to DJing and helped him with the production of tracks.

Since that time, Ingrosso has acted as a mentor for Alesso, who referred to the elder Swede as a "big brother."

Despite having learned to DJ in 2011, Alesso made his debut on DJ Magazine's list of the top 100 DJs at number 70 in that same year.

One of the first songs Alesso produced with Sebastian Ingrosso was a 2011 track named "Calling" that reached number 2 on the Beatport charts. The song would later be renamed "Calling (Lose My Mind)" with an additional feature from Ryan Tedder. Alesso's 2011 remix of "Pressure" by Nadia Ali premiered at the #1 spot on The Hype Machine and was one of the most played EDM songs of 2011.

From that point on, his popularity continued to rise. MTV named him one of the "EDM Rookies to Watch in 2012", and he recorded a BBC Radio 1 Essential Mix in March 2012. He played for a crowd of 60,000 at Creamfields, and accompanied Madonna on her MDNA World Tour at select European shows. By the end of 2012, Alesso had released another original mix called "Years" featuring Matthew Koma that performed well in the United Kingdom. He was ranked 20th on the list of the top 100 DJs of 2012 by DJ Magazine.

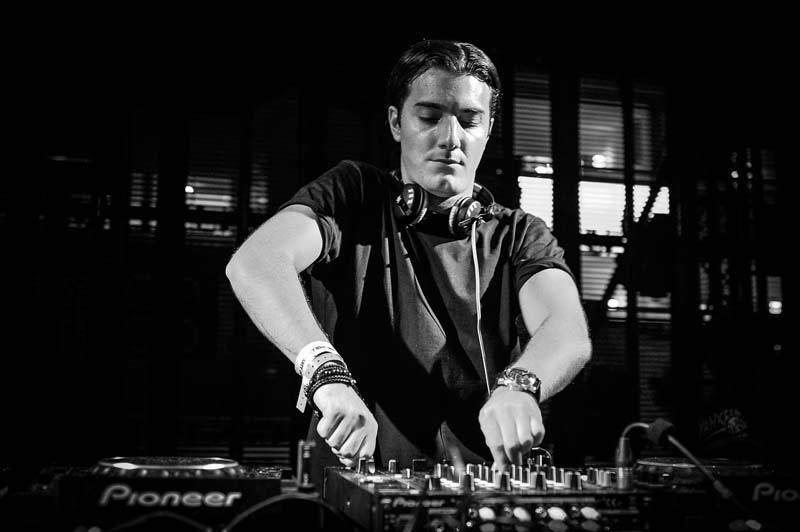
Alesso playing at Ushuaïa Ibiza in 2013.

By 2013, Alesso had played at music festivals like Coachella, Electric Daisy Carnival, Ultra Music Festival, and Tomorrowland. He released a remix of "If I Lose Myself" by OneRepublic that was nominated for Grammy and garnered almost a million listens on SoundCloud in a relatively short time. In a collaboration with Calvin Harris and Hurts, Alesso released "Under Control" which racked up 88 million views. In 2013, he achieved his highest ranking on the list of the top 100 DJs at number 13.

=== 2014–2015: Def Jam Recordings and Forever ===
In July 2014, Alesso signed with Def Jam Recordings, becoming only the second EDM producer to sign with the label (after Afrojack). He debuted a new track called "Tear the Roof Up", which was named a "Future Exclusive" by Zane Lowe. The music video for "Tear The Roof Up" was released exclusively through Snapchat in September 2014. He embarked on his "Heroes Tour", named after his single "Heroes (We Could Be)" featuring Tove Lo.

Alesso debuted a new visual identity in 2015 ahead of the release of Forever.

During the tour, Alesso teamed up with Chime for Change, a global charity that seeks to "improve the lives of women around the world." Alesso's involvement with the charity has raised over $50,000 as of October 2014. His debut studio album was originally set to be released in the first quarter of 2015, but was later released on 22 May 2015. It includes both "Heroes (We Could Be)" and "Tear the Roof Up".

The single "Heroes (We Could Be)" was officially released on 15 December 2014. His new single, titled "Cool" and featuring Roy English, premiered on 13 February 2015, on BBC Radio 1. The track, which samples Kylie Minogue's "Get Outta My Way", was officially released in Europe on 16 February 2015 and in North America on 17 February 2015.

=== 2016–present: Standalone singles ===
On 30 September 2016, his new version of "I Wanna Know" featuring Taiwanese singer Jolin Tsai was officially released. Alesso and Tsai closed International Music Summit with a discussion of what it takes to bridge the gap between East and West in electronic music. On 1 October 2016, Alesso and Tsai performed the single "I Wanna Know" and a remix version of Tsai's hit "Play" together at the Storm Music Festival in Shanghai. On 4 October 2016, it was announced that Alesso would be releasing a new version of the song "Years", collaborating with K-pop band Exo's member, Chen. The song was released on 7 October through SM Station. On 7 October 2016, Alesso premiered a new single, co-produced by Dillon Francis, called "Take My Breath Away" during Ultra Music Festival Taiwan. The single was later released on 21 October 2016.

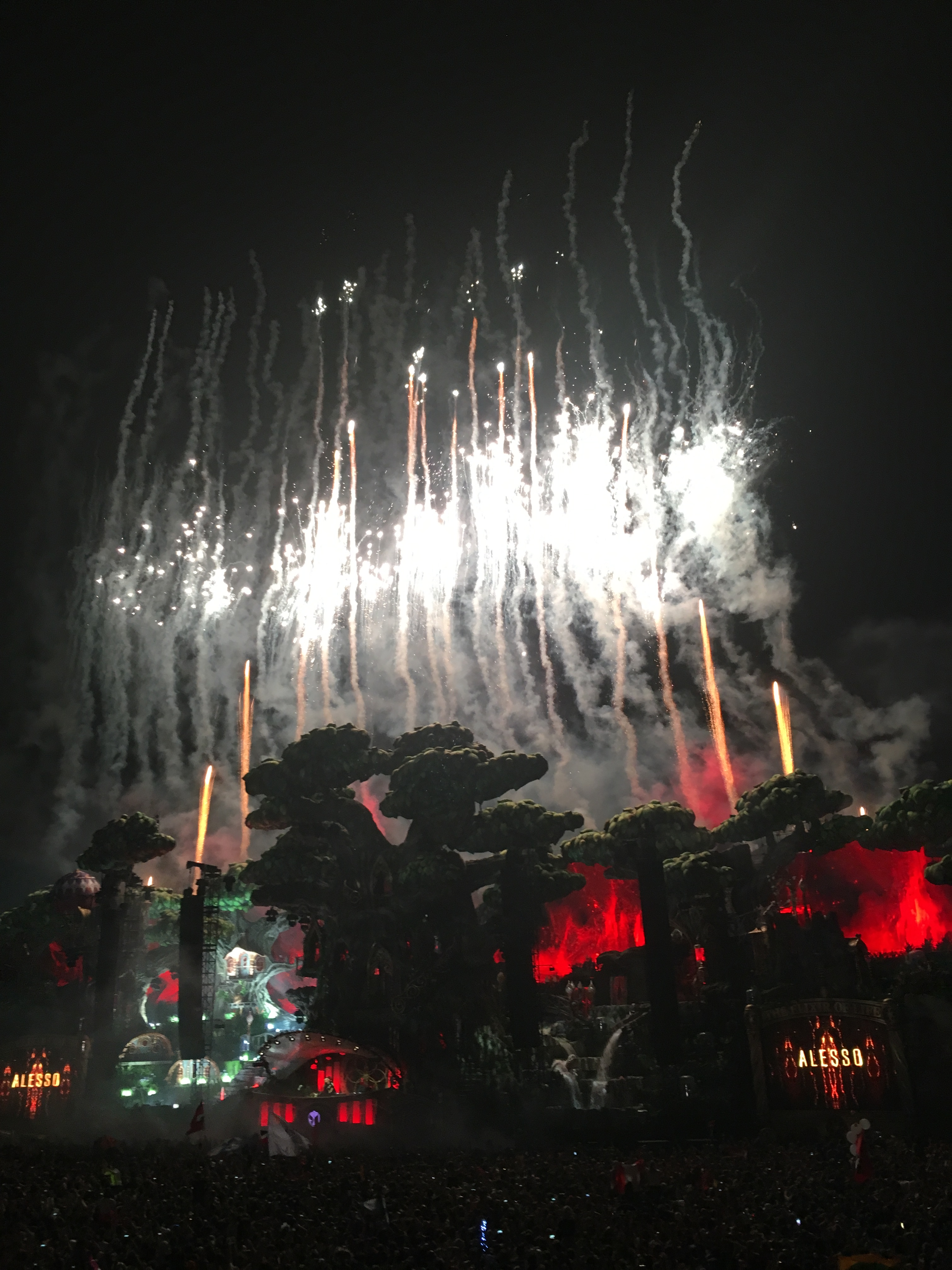
Alesso on the Tomorrowland 2016 Mainstage.

On 8 September 2017, Hailee Steinfeld released her new song "Let Me Go" which is a collaboration between Alesso, Watt, and Florida Georgia Line. On 13 October 2017, Alesso released his new single "Is That for Me" which is a collaboration with Brazilian singer Anitta.

In 2018, Alesso went on his European Tour, highlighted by his closing performance at the Tomorrowland festival in Belgium. To celebrate the 10th anniversary of Electric Zoo later that year, Alesso is invited to be the headliner along with Tiesto.

In August 2018, Alesso performed on ABC's Good Morning America's summer concert series where he debuted his new single, "Remedy". The concert was held in New York City's Central Park while Alesso was joined by singer Conor Maynard for the song's performance. Remedy reached number one on the US Dance Airplay chart.

In October 2018, Alesso played three back to back sold-out shows at the Hollywood Palladium in Los Angeles. Previously in the year he also performed shows in Brooklyn and San Francisco.

Alesso's final single release of 2018 was "Tilted Towers", made in partnership with video game streamer Ninja and was debuted live on Twitch where it was watched by over fifty thousand fans. The song's name is based on a popular map in the video game Fortnite, which Alesso and Ninja live streamed playing together to promote the track's release.

He was also featured in Netflix's 'Vai Anitta' docu-series, which follows the life of fellow Shots Studios' superstar, Anitta. An episode of the series focuses on their collaborative single "Is That for Me" and the subsequent music video shot in the Amazon jungle.

Alesso finished off his year with a New Year's Eve performance at Miami's Fontainebleau Resort. He co-headlined the show with Colombian reggaeton star J Balvin where the two played at the venue's poolside.

On 29 January 2019, it was announced that Alesso would perform at the Indy 500 Snake Pit on 26 May 2019, along with Skrillex, Illenium, and Chris Lake. Previous performers have included: Axwell Λ Ingrosso, Deadmau5, Diplo, GRiZ, Zedd, Marshmello, Martin Garrix, Steve Aoki, Kaskade, Hardwell, Dillon Francis, and Zeds Dead. On 22 February 2019, he performed at Venezuela Live Aid alongside influencers Lele Pons and Juanpa Zurita to help raise funds to fight Venezuelan humanitarian crises.

In November 2020, Alesso performed at Road to Ultra Taiwan, one of the few major music events still taking place in 2020, despite the COVID-19 pandemic.

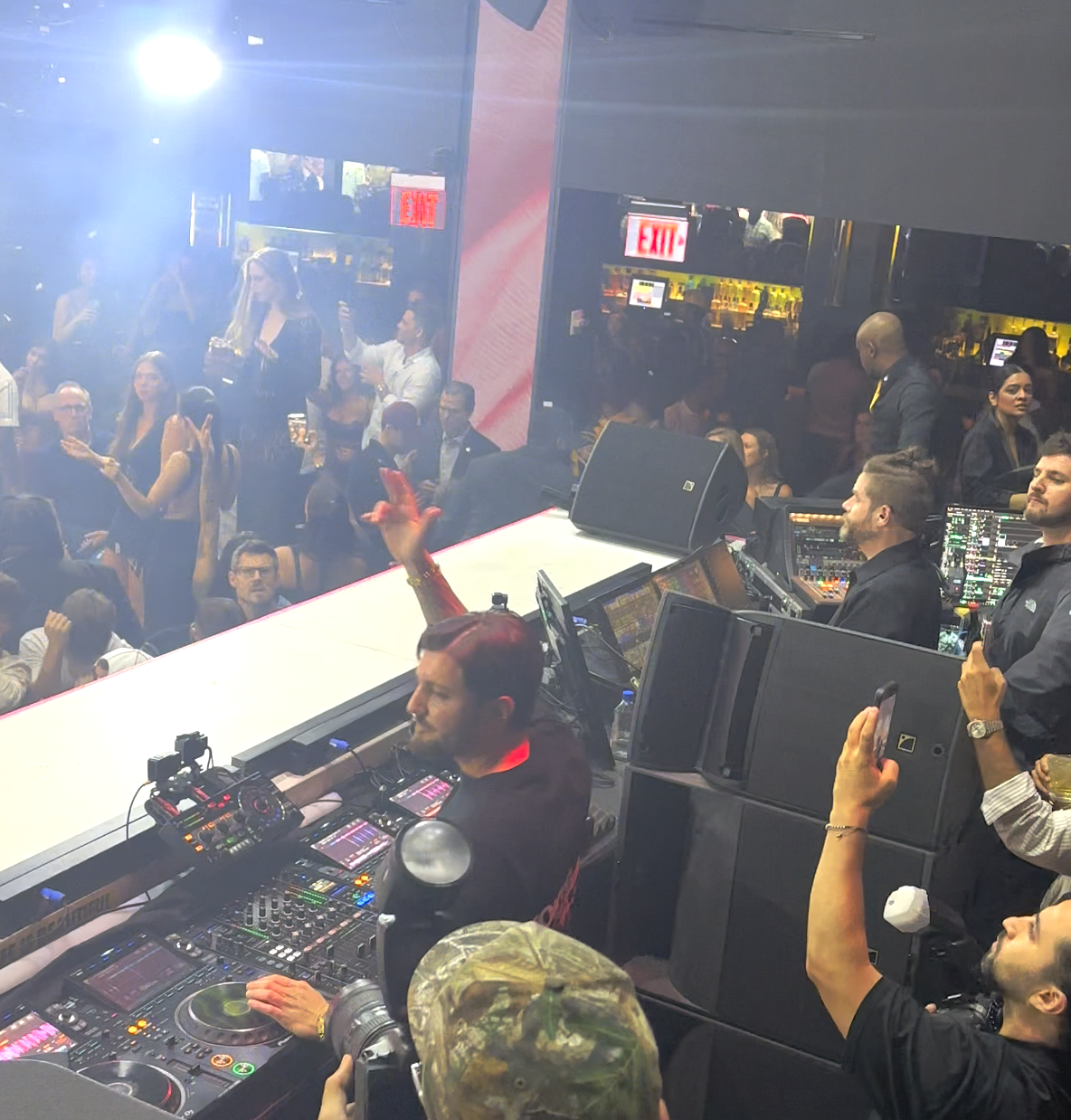
Alesso performing at LIV Miami in 2025.

In June 2023, Alesso played Heroes (We Could Be) at the 2023 UEFA Champions League final.

== In other media ==
One of the heists in the popular video game Payday 2 has the players robbing a vault during an Alesso concert. The heist, named The Alesso Heist, was released on 21 May 2015. The music played during the concert are two of Alesso's own tracks, "Payday" and "Profondo".

== Style ==
Alesso is renowned for his methods of utilizing melodic vibes in his productions along which he also alternates between his rave oriented productions. Productions include "Clash" and "Tear the Roof Up" fit with his graveled rave style, while his other melodically rich counterpart include productions such as "Years" (featuring Matthew Koma), "Heroes" (featuring Tove Lo), and his collaboration with Dirty South and Ruben Haze – "City of Dreams". Some considered him to be the next generation in Swedish music after Swedish House Mafia and Avicii.

== Personal life ==
In June 2024, he became engaged to Erin Cummins, a model and former beauty queen who represented the United States at the 2011 Miss World pageant.

== Discography ==
- Forever (2015)

== Awards and nominations ==
=== Grammy Awards ===
Year	Category	Work	Outcome	Ref.
2014	Best Remixed Recording, Non-Classical	"If I Lose Myself"	Nominated	

=== DJ Magazine top 100 DJs ===
Year	Position	Notes	Ref.
2011	70	New Entry	
2012	20	Up 50	
2013	13	Up 7	
2014	15	Down 2	
2015	13	Up 2	
2016	20	Down 7	
2017	37	Down 17	
2018	45	Down 8	
2019	61	Down 16	
2020	45	Up 16	
2021	63	Down 18	
2022	64	Down 1	
2023	52	Up 12	
2024	43	Up 9	
2025	51	Down 8	
2026	56	Down 5	

=== International Dance Music Awards ===
==== Pre-2016 ====
Year	Category	Work	Outcome	Ref.
2012	Best Progressive Track	"Calling (Lose My Mind)"	Nominated	
2012	Best Progressive Track	"Pressure"	Won	
2012	Best Break-Through DJ	—N/a	Nominated	
2014	Best Electro/Progressive Track	"If I Lose Myself"	Nominated	
2014	Best Progressive House/Electro DJ	—N/a	Nominated	
2015	Best European DJ	—N/a	Nominated	
2015	Best Progressive House/Electro DJ	—N/a	Nominated	
2016	Best European DJ	—N/a	Nominated	
2016	Best Progressive House/Electro DJ	—N/a	Nominated	

==== 2018—present ====
Year	Category	Work	Outcome	Ref.
2018	Best Remix	"Something Just Like This"	Won	

(Note: No award ceremony was held in 2017. In 2018 winners were chosen by the Winter Music Conference themselves. 2019 marks the first year of public voting since the Winter Music Conference's restructure.)

== See also ==
- Swedish popular music
