= Storm Electronic Music Festival =

Electronic music festival in China

- Status: Active
- Genre: Electronic
- Frequency: Annual
- Country: China
- Years active: 12
- Inaugurated: November 16, 2013
- Founder: Eric Chow
- Organiser: A2Live
- Sponsor: Budweiser
- Website: a2storm.cn/en

Storm Electronic Music Festival (simplified Chinese: 风暴电音节; traditional Chinese: 風暴電音節), or simply Storm Music Festival, was an annual outdoor electronic music festival that took place around October in the city of Shanghai. The festival was founded in 2013 by Eric Chow. Other Storm festivals take place across China in locations like Shenzhen, Chengdu, Guangzhou, Beijing, Nanjing, and Changsha. At the end of Storm Festival 2017, it added one more country: Australia.

== Shows ==
Date	City	Country	Venue
2013/11/16	Shanghai	China	Xuhui Binjiang Green Space
2013/11/22	Shanghai	China	Xuhui Binjiang Green Space
2014/10/5	Shanghai	China	Xuhui Binjiang Green Space
2014/10/6	Shanghai	China	Xuhui Binjiang Green Space
2015/10/3	Shanghai	China	Xuhui Binjiang Green Space
2015/10/4	Shanghai	China	Xuhui Binjiang Green Space
2015/11/21	Shenzhen	China	Shenzhen Longgang Sports Center
2015/11/22	Shenzhen	China	Shenzhen Longgang Sports Center
2016/7/1	Chengdu	China	Cultural Heritage Park
2016/7/2	Chengdu	China	Cultural Heritage Park
2016/9/10	Guangzhou	China	Tianhe Sports Centre
2016/9/11	Guangzhou	China	Tianhe Sports Centre
2016/9/15	Beijing	China	Tongying Yanxihu Golf Club
2016/9/16	Beijing	China	Tongying Yanxihu Golf Club
2016/10/1	Shanghai	China	Shendi Ecology Park
2016/10/2	Shanghai	China	Shendi Ecology Park
2016/12/17	Shenzhen	China	LonggangBroadcast TV Center
2016/12/18	Shenzhen	China	LonggangBroadcast TV Center
2017/8/12	Chengdu	China	Oriental Beauty Park
2017/8/13	Chengdu	China	Oriental Beauty Park
2017/8/26	Guangzhou	China	Chimelong Paradise
2017/8/27	Guangzhou	China	Chimelong Paradise
2017/9/2	Nanjing	China	Fish Mouth Wetland Park
2017/9/3	Nanjing	China	Fish Mouth Wetland Park
2017/9/9	Beijing	China	Tongying Yanxihu Golf Club
2017/9/10	Beijing	China	Tongying Yanxihu Golf Club
2017/9/16	Changsha	China	Changsha International Convention and Exhibition Center
2017/9/17	Changsha	China	Changsha International Convention and Exhibition Center
2017/9/23	Shanghai	China	Shanghai International Music Village
2017/9/24	Shanghai	China	Shanghai International Music Village
2017/12/9	Sydney	Australia	The Crescent
