= Take My Breath Away (Alesso song) =

2016 song by Alesso

Single by Alesso
- Released: 21 October 2016
- Genre: Dance-pop
- Length: 3:08
- Label: Alefune; Virgin EMI
- Songwriter(s): Alessandro Lindblad; Atlas; Dillon Francis
- Producer(s): Alesso; Dillon Francis

Alesso singles chronology
"I Wanna Know" (2016)	"Take My Breath Away" (2016)	"Falling" (2017)

"Take My Breath Away" is a song by Swedish DJ and record producer Alesso, co-produced with Dillon Francis and featuring uncredited vocals by Diana Gordon. It was released on 21 October 2016.

== Composition ==
The song around a well-suited blend of sultry vocals, melodic synths, pounding percussions, and frenetic builds.

== Lyric video ==
The lyric video was uploaded on 2 November 2016, that takes listeners on a journey through stunning visuals.

== Charts ==
=== Weekly charts ===
Chart (2016–17)	Peak position
Belgium Dance (Ultratop Flanders)	25
Belgium Dance (Ultratop Wallonia)	38
Sweden (Sverigetopplistan)	56
US Dance Club Songs (Billboard)	22
US Hot Dance/Electronic Songs (Billboard)	27

=== Year-end charts ===
Chart (2017)	Position
US Hot Dance/Electronic Songs (Billboard)	100
