= Happiness Tour =

2010–2012 concert tour by Hurts

- Concert by Hurts
- Happiness Tour Poster
- Location: Europe, Asia, North America
- Associated album: Happiness
- Start date: 22 February 2010
- End date: 9 November 2012
- No. of shows: 207; 192 in Europe; 14 in Asia; 1 in North America

Hurts concert chronology
- Happiness Tour (2010–2012); Exile Tour (2013–2014)

The Happiness Tour is the first concert tour by British band Hurts in support of their debut album Happiness. At the end of February 2010 Hurts played four concerts in the UK and Germany, and in April and May they joined the NME Radar tour, then they resumed their recitals and played at the festivals in Europe and Asia, including a debut performance at the festival in Japan. Since October, a variety of solo artists and groups increasingly began to play as the opening acts at Hurts' gigs, and by the end of 2010 Hurts themselves supported Scissor Sisters in their UK arena tour. In April 2011, Hurts held their debut performance in the US at the festival Coachella, and in May 2011 Hurts made an Asian tour, which was followed by a series of European summer festivals. 4 November 2011 was the final performance of a two-year Happiness Tour, in London Kylie Minogue joined the group to perform a duet of two songs. In 2012, the band played at a few summer music festivals.

== Background ==
Description of performance, scenery

During the whole show Theo Hutchcraft throws in a crowd white roses on long stems with cut off spikes, there are usually about 10 pieces in a rider. During "Evelyn" he breaks a microphone stand. Before "Illuminated" he asks the crowd to light their phones. On Theo's left hand there is Adam Anderson, he performs most of the songs while sitting at the synthesizer placed on a transparent plastic base, but at "Evelyn" he gets up and plays the guitar, after that he throws a mediator in a crowd. Encore they perform song "Better Than Love".

At the first legs of the tour Hurts usually play against a white screen, in time complemented by the same illuminated pillars of white fabric. Since 27 June 2010 at large numbers of concerts Hurts hang up the backdrop of stage with a large black linen with a white band logo on it.
At the first shows Theo appears with the accessories – a white scarf and a comb in his pocket, during the tour there are also appears black leather gloves, and at summer festivals Theo and Adam often perform wearing sunglasses "Ray-Ban". Adam sometimes wears a black scarf, bow tie or bolo tie, and a long black overcoat.

From the beginning of February 2011 Theo begin to appear on stage wear a cape draped over the suit. At the same time for a while, till 19 March 2011, the usual Hurts' scenery with highlighted cloth pillars are replaced by big blinds, on which silhouettes of the dancers from their second video for "Wonderful Life" are projected. Since 1 October 2011 blinds are replaced by a big banner with a house with big windows printed on it.
On some summer festivals in 2012 images of glowing broken and crossing lines, and a variety of videos including their video clips are projected on the screens.

Musicians and dancers

From the first show and till 6 August 2011 Hurts are accompanied by back-vocalist Richard Sidaway, who stays the whole show without any move, he also sings the second part of the song called "Verona", invariably there are keyboarder Pete Watson and drummer Paul Walsham. 9 October 2010 at O_{2} Shepherd's Bush Empire in London on "Wonderful Life" there were a female saxophonist and a female dancer dressed like the girl from the debut black-and-white video of "Wonderful Life". Her dance is a mix of styles waacking and vogue.

Since 2 February 2011 show at Brighton Dome in United Kingdom at many gigs there are a male bass guitarist and a female viola player on stage with Hurts.

3 June 2011 at the first summer festival named Rock im Park in Germany the band joined by two female dancers, two violinists and one cellist on a permanent basis, one of the girls also played the harp.
The orchestra plays solo parts at the opening track "Intro music", at instrumental part of the song "The Water" and at the song with a grim history "Gloomy Sunday".

Dancers appear on stage dressed in long black robes wear hoods during "Intro music" holding the black flags. On the first song "Silver Lining" they stay on the scene on their knees with their hands folded in prayer. On "Gloomy Sunday" they go on stage in black tutus and en pointes with long red ribbons tied around their wrists and stay to dance on stage during the song "Better Than Love". In 2012 they put on red dresses for the song "Devotion".

Special performances

The song "Devotion" had two special performance during the tour:
– for the first time it was a duet with Clare Maguire, who supported Hurts at the gig at Oran Mor in Glasgow, 4 October 2010;
– the second time was at the final show of the 2011 leg and it was a duet with Kylie Minogue at Brixton Academy in London, 4 November 2011. Also they sang together Kylie Minogue' song "Confide in Me".

17 November 2010 at Union Chapel in London, United Kingdom Adam Anderson was absent due to he has thrown his back out after trying to carry an old piano. It was the first Hurts' acoustic concert. That day Tali Lennox was on scene, she sat on the chair and plucked rose petals.
15 January 2011 at The Shibuya DUO Music Exchange in Tokyo, Japan Adam Anderson was absent due to his tooth accident.

Hurts used red confetti at their show at Somerset House in London, 14 July 2011, Edward Bovingdon wrote in gig review: "Theatre dramatics came in the form of sexy ballerinas during intervals and a wave of red confetti ended the evening with a shower of symbolic blood."; glow sticks, confetti and fireworks at Zitadelle Spandau, in Berlin, 13 August 2011; fireworks at Brixton Academy in London, 4 November 2011.

On 8 November 2011 Hurts wrote at Facebook:

Ladies & Gentlemen. Thank you. 22 months on tour is now over. Over 200 concerts. To over 500,000 people. Across 46 countries. From 200 people at St Philip's Church in Salford, our first ever gig, to 80,000 at Rock Am Ring in Germany. Along with almost 1 million albums & 1 million singles.
Unbelievable. Thank you to everyone we met on the way, all the gifts you gave us, every word you sang, every vote you cast, every kind word you wrote, for believing in us & making our dreams come true. Without you, we would be nothing. We love you... x

== Reception ==
Critics mostly took the Happiness tour positively, unanimously made special mention of attention to the details of the show and consistency of the performance in the same style, the performances of the band even secured the definition "The Theatre of Hurts". Musicians call themselves the same way.

== Opening acts ==
There were more than 40 supporting acts for the tour. They are:

- New Young Pony Club (London, 10 June 2010)
- Clare Maguire (Glasgow, 2–4 October 2010; UK, Ireland, 2–8 February 2011;
  Germany, select March 2011 dates)
- (we are) Performance (UK, 5–9 October 2010)
- Handsome Poets (Amsterdam, 10 October 2010)
- Noonie Bao (Stockholm, 16 October 2010)
- Roman Fischer (Germany, 18–22 October 2010 dates)
- Stereo Grand (Brussels, 30 October 2010; Luxembourg, 31 October 2010)
- Kamp! (Poland, 21–22 January 2011)
- Shadowplay! (Gdańsk, 23 January 2011)
- Shirubi Ikazuchi (Tallinn, 25 January 2011)
- TV OFF (Helsinki, 26 January 2011)
- Saint Saviour (UK, Ireland select February 2011 dates; London, 14 July 2011)
- Stendhal Syndrome and Alba G. Corral (Spain, 12–13 February 2011)
- The Eleanors (Porto, 15 February 2011)
- Too Young To Love (Bologna, 18 February 2011)
- Harvey Quinnt (Brussels, 1 March 2011)
- Pien Feith (Groningen, 2 March 2011)
- Rara Avis (Praha, 13 March 2011)
- Bunny Lake (Vienna, 15 March 2011)
- Lovers Electric (Munich, 16 March 2011; Berlin, 13 August 2011)
- Rimer London (Amsterdam, 19 March 2011)
- Cata.Pirata (Amsterdam, 19 March 2011)
- Dikta (Reykjavík, 20 March 2011)
- Retro Stefson (Reykjavík, 20 March 2011)
- Inje (Belgrade, 25 May 2011)
- Jack Beauregard (Germany, 5,7 June 2011)
- Gaggle (London, 14 July 2011)
- A Forest (Dortmund, 27 July 2011)
- Kensington Road (Dortmund, 27 July 2011)
- Firefox AK (Berlin, 13 August 2011; select September, October 2011 dates)
- The Heartbreaks (select October 2011 dates)
- SuperXiu (Poznań, 9 October 2011)
- Nефть (Russia, 17–18 October 2011)
- Nipplepeople (Zagreb, 23 October 2011)
- Niki & the Dove (UK, 2–4 November 2011)
- Jess Mills (UK, 2–4 November 2011)

== Setlist ==
During the tour the setlist was expanded more than two times.

22–27 February 2010
1. "Better Than Love"
2. "Silver Lining"
3. "Blood, Tears & Gold"
4. "Unspoken"
5. "Sunday"
6. "Stay"
7. "Wonderful Life"
8. "Illuminated"

Notes

- 22 February 2010 the second song in setlist was "Happiness" but was crossed out
26 April – 24 September 2010
1. "Silver Lining"
2. "Wonderful Life"
3. "Happiness"
4. "Blood, Tears & Gold"
5. "Sunday"
6. "Stay"
7. "Illuminated"
8. "Better Than Love"
2 October 2010 – 30 May 2011
1. "Unspoken"
2. "Silver Lining"
3. "Wonderful Life"
4. "Happiness"
5. "Blood, Tears & Gold"
6. "Evelyn"
7. "Sunday"
8. "Mother Nature"
9. "Verona"
10. "Devotion"
11. "Confide in Me" (Kylie Minogue cover)
12. "Illuminated"
13. "Stay"

Encore:

14. "Better Than Love"

Notes

- "Mother Nature" played since 2 February 2011
- "Stay" went after "Illuminated" since March 2011
2–8 February 2011
1. "Silver Lining"
2. "Wonderful Life"
3. "Happiness"
4. "Unspoken"
5. "Devotion"
6. "Mother Nature"
7. "Blood, Tears & Gold"
8. "Evelyn"
9. "Sunday"
10. "Confide in Me" (Kylie Minogue cover)
11. "Verona"
12. "Illuminated"
13. "Stay"

Encore:

14. "Better Than Love"
15 April, 3 June – 18 August 2011
1. "Silver Lining"
2. "Wonderful Life"
3. "Happiness"
4. "Blood, Tears & Gold"
5. "Evelyn"
6. "Sunday"
7. "Verona"
8. "Unspoken"
9. "Mother Nature"
10. "Devotion"
11. "The Water" (instrumental)
12. "Confide in Me" (Kylie Minogue cover)
13. "Illuminated"
14. "Stay"

Encore:

15. "Better Than Love"

Notes

- "Wonderful Life", "Happiness", "Blood, Tears & Gold", "Evelyn", "Verona", "Unspoken",
  "Mother Nature", "Devotion", "The Water" (instrumental) were out of set list in selected dates
- "Verona" sang solo by Theo since 8 August 2011
1 October – 4 November 2011

Intro music

1. "Silver Lining"
2. "Wonderful Life"
3. "Happiness"
4. "Blood, Tears & Gold"
5. "Evelyn"
6. "Sunday"
7. "Gloomy Sunday" (instrumental)
8. "Verona"
9. "Mother Nature"
10. "Unspoken"
11. "Devotion"
12. "The Water" (instrumental)
13. "Confide in Me" (Kylie Minogue cover)
14. "Affair"
15. "Illuminated"
16. "Stay"

Encore:

17. "The Water"
18. "Better Than Love"
8–18 August 2012
1. "Silver Lining"
2. "Wonderful Life"
3. "Happiness"
4. "Blood, Tears & Gold"
5. "Evelyn"
6. "Sunday"
7. "Mother Nature"
8. "Unspoken"
9. "Devotion"
10. "The Water" (instrumental)
11. "Confide in Me" (Kylie Minogue cover)
12. "Guilt"
13. "Illuminated"
14. "Stay"

Encore:

15. "Better Than Love"

Notes

- "Guilt" was premiered 8 August 2012
- "Mother Nature", "The Water" were out of set list in selected dates
20–28 September 2012
1. "Silver Lining"
2. "Wonderful Life"
3. "Happiness"
4. "Blood, Tears & Gold"
5. "Evelyn"
6. "Sunday"
7. "Devotion"
8. "Unspoken"
9. "Confide in Me" (Kylie Minogue cover)
10. "Affair"
11. "Illuminated"
12. "Stay"

Encore:

13. "Better Than Love"

== Tour dates ==
Hurts' scenery at Happiness tour

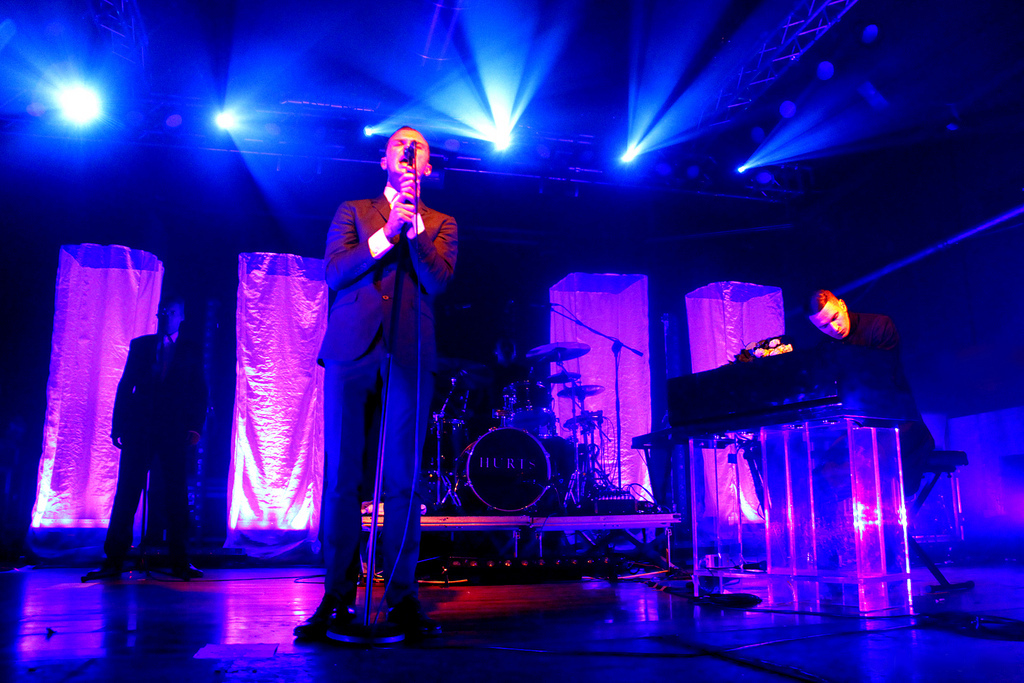
2010

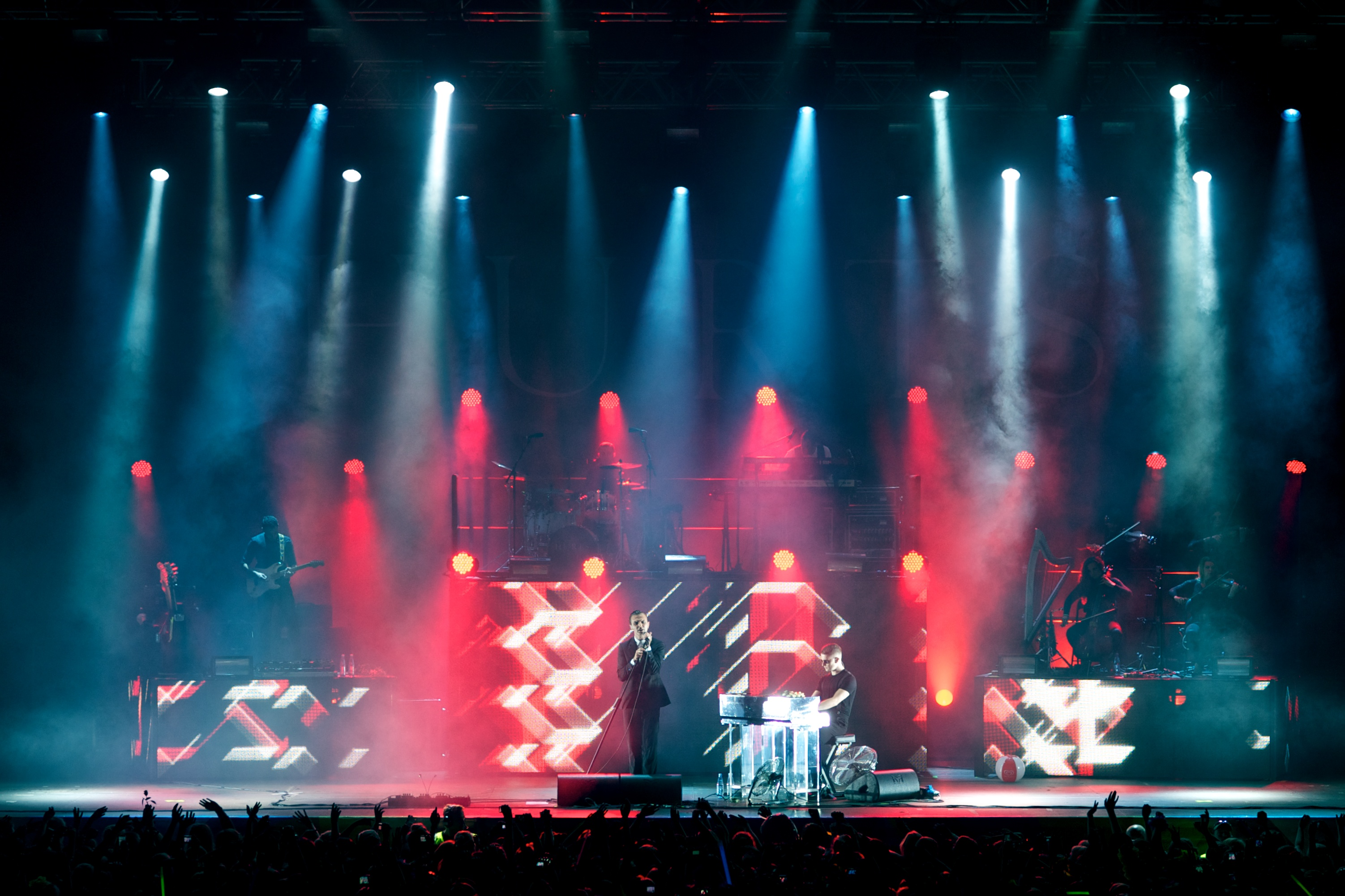
2012

Date	City	Country	Venue/Event
Europe
22 January 2010	Berlin	Germany	Friedrichstadt-Palast
22 February 2010	Salford	England	St Philip's with St Stephen's Church
24 February 2010	London	England	Wilton's Music Hall
26 February 2010	Berlin	Germany	Magnet Club
27 February 2010	Cologne	Germany	Gebäude 9
26 April 2010^{[1]}	Glasgow	Scotland	King Tut's Wah Wah Hut
27 April 2010^{[1]}	Preston	England	53 Degrees
28 April 2010^{[1]}	Manchester	England	Manchester Academy 3
30 April 2010^{[1]}	Stoke-on-Trent	England	The Sugarmill
1 May 2010	Leeds	England	Live at Leeds Festival
2 May 2010^{[1]}	Middlesbrough	England	Teesside University
4 May 2010^{[1]}	Oxford	England	O_{2} Academy Oxford
5 May 2010^{[1]}	Bristol	England	The Thekla
6 May 2010^{[1]}	Wrexham	Wales	Central Station
8 May 2010^{[1]}	York	England	The Duchess
9 May 2010^{[1]}	Portsmouth	England	The Wedgewood Rooms
10 May 2010^{[1]}	London	England	KOKO
11 May 2010^{[1]}	Norwich	England	The Waterfront
12 May 2010^{[1]}	Northampton	England	The Roadmender
14 May 2010	Brighton	England	The Great Escape Festival
15 May 2010	Cologne	Germany	Luxor
16 May 2010	Berlin	Germany	Lido
20 May 2010	Dublin	Ireland	Whelan's
1 June 2010	Berlin	Germany	Admiralspalast
10 June 2010	London	England	Dingwalls
23 June 2010	Madrid	Spain	Charada
27 June 2010	St. Gallen	Switzerland	Openair St. Gallen Festival
3 July 2010	Penrhos	Wales	Wakestock Festival
9 July 2010	Lisbon	Portugal	Optimus Alive Festival
10 July 2010	Punchestown	Ireland	Oxegen Festival
11 July 2010	Balado	Scotland	T in the Park Festival
17 July 2010	Gräfenhainichen	Germany	Melt! Festival
18 July 2010	London	England	Lovebox Festival
31 July 2010	Dorset	England	Camp Bestival
Asia
7 August 2010	Tokyo	Japan	Summer Sonic Festival
8 August 2010	Osaka	Japan	Summer Sonic Festival
Europe
20 August 2010	Hasselt	Belgium	Pukkelpop Festival
21 August 2010	Chelmsford	England	V Festival
22 August 2010	Stafford	England	V Festival
27 August 2010	Helsinki	Finland	Club Yk
28 August 2010	Stockholm	Sweden	Popaganda
1 September 2010	London	England	RIBA
3 September 2010	Dublin	Ireland	Electric Picnic
6 September 2010	Manchester	United Kingdom	HMV
11 September 2010	Isle of Wight	United Kingdom	Bestival
13 September 2010	Zürich	Germany	Seefeld-Razzia
15 September 2010	Amsterdam	Netherlands	Desmet Studios
24 September 2010	Baden-Baden	Germany	New Pop Festival
2 October 2010	Brighton	England	Concorde2
3 October 2010	Leeds	England	Cockpit
4 October 2010	Glasgow	Scotland	Oran Mor
5 October 2010	Manchester	England	The Ritz
7 October 2010^{[2]}	Birmingham	England	HMV Institute
8 October 2010	Bristol	England	Trinity Church
9 October 2010	London	England	O_{2} Shepherd's Bush Empire
10 October 2010^{[3]}	Amsterdam	Netherlands	Paradiso
12 October 2010	Copenhagen	Denmark	Little Vega
13 October 2010	Aarhus	Denmark	Voxhall
15 October 2010	Reykjavík	Iceland	Iceland Airwaves Festival
16 October 2010	Stockholm	Sweden	Debaser Medis
18 October 2010^{[4]}	Berlin	Germany	Kulturbrauerei
19 October 2010	Hamburg	Germany	Uebel & Gefährlich
20 October 2010^{[5]}	Cologne	Germany	Essigfabrik
22 October 2010^{[6]}	Munich	Germany	Theaterfabrik
23 October 2010	Zürich	Switzerland	Harterei Club
24 October 2010	Milan	Italy	Magazzini Generali
26 October 2010^{[7]}	Barcelona	Spain	Bikini
27 October 2010^{[8]}	Madrid	Spain	Penelope
29 October 2010^{[9]}	Paris	France	Le Trabendo
30 October 2010	Brussels	Belgium	The Botanique
31 October 2010	Hollerich	Luxembourg	Den Atelier
17 November 2010^{[10]}	London	England	Union Chapel
3 December 2010^{[11]}	Birmingham	England	LG Arena
6 December 2010^{[11]}	Cardiff	Wales	Motorpoint Arena Cardiff
8 December 2010^{[11]}	Glasgow	Glasgow	SECC
10 December 2010^{[11]}	Newcastle	England	Metro Radio Arena
11 December 2010^{[11]}	Manchester	England	Manchester Arena
12 December 2010^{[11]}	Brighton	England	Brighton Centre
14 December 2010^{[11]}	Nottingham	England	Trent FM Arena
15 December 2010^{[11]}	London	England	The O_{2} Arena
16 December 2010^{[11]}	Bournemouth	England	BIC
Asia
13 January 2011	Osaka	Japan	Club Quattro
14 January 2011	Tokyo	Japan	The Shibuya DUO Music Exchange
15 January 2011^{[12]}	Tokyo	Japan	The Shibuya DUO Music Exchange
Europe
21 January 2011	Kraków	Poland	Studio
22 January 2011	Warsaw	Poland	Stodola
23 January 2011	Gdańsk	Poland	Parlament
25 January 2011^{[13]}	Tallinn	Estonia	Kalevi Spordihall
26 January 2011^{[14]}	Helsinki	Finland	The Circus
2 February 2011	Brighton	United Kingdom	Brighton Dome
3 February 2011	London	United Kingdom	HMV Forum
4 February 2011	Glasgow	Scotland	O_{2} ABC
6 February 2011	Leeds	England	O_{2} Academy Leeds
7 February 2011	Dublin	Ireland	Academy
8 February 2011	Manchester	England	Manchester Academy 1
12 February 2011	Barcelona	Spain	Sala Apolo
13 February 2011	Madrid	Spain	Joy Eslava
15 February 2011	Porto	Portugal	Hard Club
18 February 2011	Bologna	Italy	Estragon
19 February 2011	Bern	Switzerland	Bierhübeli
20 February 2011	Zürich	Switzerland	X-tra
21 February 2011	Zürich	Switzerland	X-tra
1 March 2011	Brussels	Belgium	Ancienne Belgique
2 March 2011	Groningen	Netherlands	De Oosterpoort
3 March 2011	Copenhagen	Denmark	Store Vega
5 March 2011	Stockholm	Sweden	Berns
6 March 2011	Oslo	Norway	Rockefeller
8 March 2011	Hamburg	Germany	Grosse Freiheit 36
9 March 2011	Frankfurt	Germany	Hugenottenhalle
11 March 2011	Dresden	Germany	Alter Schlachthof
12 March 2011^{[15]}	Berlin	Germany	C-Club
13 March 2011	Prague	Czech Republic	Lucerna Music Bar
15 March 2011	Vienna	Austria	Arena
16 March 2011	Munich	Germany	Tonhalle
17 March 2011^{[16]}	Cologne	Germany	Palladium
19 March 2011	Amsterdam	Netherlands	Melkweg
20 March 2011	Reykjavík	Iceland	Vodafone Sports Hall
25 March 2011	Thessaloniki	Greece	Block 33
26 March 2011^{[17]}	Tavros	Greece	Fuzz Club
1 April 2011	Saint Petersburg	Russia	GlavClub
2 April 2011	Moscow	Russia	GlavClub
3 April 2011	Ekaterinburg	Russia	Tele-Club
5 April 2011	Kyiv	Ukraine	Crystal Hall
7 April 2011^{[18]}	Bucharest	Romania	Fratelli Studios
North America
15 April 2011	Indio	United States	Coachella Festival
Asia
6 May 2011	Bangsar	Malaysia	Mist Club
7 May 2011	Jakarta	Indonesia	Nylon Music Festival
8 May 2011	Bali	Indonesia	Hard Rock Cafe
10 May 2011	Downtown Core	Singapore	Esplanade Concert Hall
11 May 2011	Kowloon	Hong Kong	KITEC Rotunda
13 May 2011	Taipei	Taiwan	Legacy
14 May 2011	Beijing	China	Club Tango 3rd Floor
17 May 2011	Tel Aviv	Israel	Reading 3
19 May 2011	Dubai	United Arab Emirates	Irish Village
Europe
25 May 2011	Belgrad	Serbia	Belgrade Arena
26 May 2011	Skopje	North Macedonia	Metropolis Arena
28 May 2011	Bristol	England	Dot to Dot Festival
29 May 2011	Nottingham	England	Dot to Dot Festival
30 May 2011	Manchester	England	Dot to Dot Festival
3 June 2011	Nuremberg	Germany	Rock im Park
4 June 2011	Nuremberg	Germany	Rock am Ring
5 June 2011	Dresden	Germany	Junge Garde
7 June 2011	Hamburg	Germany	Stadtpark Freilichtbuhne
8 June 2011	Berlin	Germany	Tape Club
9 June 2011	Crans-près-Céligny	Switzerland	Caribana Festival
11 June 2011	Newport	England	Isle of Wight Festival
12 June 2011	Landgraaf	Netherlands	Pinkpop Festival
22 June 2011	Odesa	Ukraine	Ibiza Club
24 June 2011	Razlog	Bulgaria	Elevation Music Festival
26 June 2011	Shepton Mallet	England	Glastonbury Festival
30 June 2011	Werchter	Belgium	Rock Werchter Festival
2 July 2011	St. Gallen	Switzerland	Open Air St. Gallen Festival
3 July 2011	Gdynia	Poland	Heineken Open'er Festival
5 July 2011	Munich	Germany	Pavillon 21 MINI Opera Space
8 July 2011	Turku	Finland	Ruisrock Festival
9 July 2011	Naas	Ireland	Oxegen Festival
10 July 2011	Kinross	Scotland	T in the Park Festival
14 July 2011	London	England	Somerset House
15 July 2011	Salacgriva	Latvia	Positivus Festival
16 July 2011	Hultsfred	Sweden	Hultsfred Festival
17 July 2011	Suffolk	England	Latitude Festival
27 July 2011	Dortmund	Germany	Dortmunder Music Week Festival
4 August 2011	Castellón	Spain	Arenal Sound Festival
6 August 2011	Benešov	Czech Republic	Sazava Festival
8 August 2011	Budapest	Hungary	Sziget Festival
12 August 2011	Piešťany	Slovakia	Grape Festival
13 August 2011	Berlin	Germany	Spandau Citadel Music Festival
14 August 2011	Hildesheim	Germany	M'era Luna Festival
18 August 2011	Sankt Pölten	Austria	FM4 Frequency Festival
21 August 2011	Chelmsford	England	V Festival
18 September 2011	London	England	Claridge's
30 September 2011	Stuttgart	Germany	Porsche-Arena
1 October 2011	Frankfurt	Germany	Jahrhunderthalle
2 October 2011	Munich	Germany	Zenith
4 October 2011	Düsseldorf	Germany	Mitsubishi Electric Halle
5 October 2011	Erfurt	Germany	Thüringenhalle
7 October 2011	Aachen	Germany	1Live eine Nacht
8 October 2011	Prague	Czech Republic	Lucerna Music Hall
9 October 2011	Poznań	Poland	MTP
11 October 2011	Minsk	Belarus	Sport Palace
12 October 2011	Kaunas	Lithuania	Karaliaus Mindaugo pr. 50
14 October 2011	Tallinn	Estonia	Saku Suurhall Arena
15 October 2011	Helsinki	Finland	Old Ice Hall
17 October 2011	Saint Petersburg	Russia	GlavClub
18 October 2011^{[19]}	Moscow	Russia	Arena Moscow
20 October 2011	Kyiv	Ukraine	Sport Palace
23 October 2011	Zagreb	Croatia	Bocarski dom
24 October 2011	Vienna	Austria	Gasometer
26 October 2011	Milan	Italy	Alcatraz
27 October 2011	Innsbruck	Austria	Dogana
29 October 2011	Basel	Switzerland	Avo Session Basel
30 October 2011	Zürich	Switzerland	Maag Event Hall
31 October 2011	Zürich	Switzerland	Maag Event Hall
3 November 2011	Glasgow	Scotland	O_{2} Academy Glasgow
4 November 2011	London	England	O_{2} Academy Brixton
8 August 2012	Budapest	Hungary	Sziget Festival
11 August 2012	Buftea	Romania	Summer Well Festival
12 August 2012	Zofingen	Switzerland	Heitere Open Air Festival
14 August 2012	Palanga	Lithuania	Pildyk Friends Festival
18 August 2012	Espoo	Finland	Weekend Festival
17 September 2012	Hanover	Germany	Volkswagen
20 September 2012	Novosibirsk	Russia	Crystal Hall
22 September 2012	Chelyabinsk	Russia	World Trade Centre
24 September 2012	Kazan	Russia	Piramida
26 September 2012	Samara	Russia	Metelica
28 September 2012	Voronezh	Russia	Zavod
9 November 2012	Warsaw	Poland	Studio Las

Notes
^{1} This performance is a part of the NME Radar tour.
^{2} The show in Birmingham was originally scheduled at The Library, but it was moved to the HMV Institute.
^{3} The show in Amsterdam was originally scheduled at the Melkweg, but it was moved to the Paradiso.
^{4} The show in Berlin was originally scheduled at the Lido, but it was moved to the Kulturbrauerei.
^{5} The show in Cologne was originally scheduled at the Luxor, but it was moved to the Essigfabrik.
^{6} The show in Munich was originally scheduled at the 59:1 Munchen, but it was moved to the Theaterfabrik.
^{7} The show in Barcelona was originally scheduled at the LA2, but it was moved to the Bikini.
^{8} The show in Madrid was originally scheduled at the Joy Eslava, but it was moved to the Penelope.
^{9} The show in Paris was originally scheduled at the La Boule Noir, but it was moved to the Le Trabendo.
^{10} Adam Anderson was absent due to he has thrown his back out after trying to carry an old piano.
^{11} This performance is a part of The beginning of The Night Work Tour supporting Scissor Sisters.
^{12} Adam Anderson was absent due to his tooth accident.
^{13} The show in Tallinn was originally scheduled at the Rock Café, but it was moved to the Kalevi Spordihall.
^{14} The show in Helsinki was originally scheduled at the Tavastia, but it was moved to The Circus.
^{15} The show in Berlin was originally scheduled at the Huxleys, but it was moved to the Columbiahalle.
^{16} The show in Cologne was originally scheduled at the E-Werk, but it was moved to the Palladium.
^{17} The show in Athens was originally scheduled at the Kyttaro, but it was moved to the Fuzz Club.
^{18} The show in Bucharest was originally scheduled at the Silver Church, but it was moved to the Fratelli Studios.
^{19} The show in Moscow was originally scheduled at the A2, but it was moved to the Arena Moscow.

Rescheduled dates

8 November 2010 Theo Hutchcraft wrote on Twitter, that he has caused himself a frightening injury – his eardrum has perforated. He will be OK, but the doctor said that if he put strain on it and play a full show, it could be very damaging.

11 November 2010	Bucharest, Romania	Silver Church	Rescheduled to 7 April 2011.
12 November 2010	Athens, Greece	Kyttaro	Rescheduled to 26 March 2011 due to Theo's eardrum has perforated.
13 November 2010	Thessaloniki, Greece	Block 33	Rescheduled to 25 March 2011 due to Theo's eardrum has perforated.

Cancelled dates

9 September 2010	Milan, Italy	Piazzetta Crocerossa	Performance was cancelled due to failing to obtain work visa.
10 February 2011	Paris, France	Le Trianon	Performance was cancelled without explanation.
2 November 2011	Brighton, United Kingdom	Brighton Centre	Performance was cancelled due to unforeseen circumstances.

== Personnel ==
Main

- Matt Vines, Neil Reeves – management
- Alan Davies – lightning director (2012)
- Stefan Goodchild – creative coder
- Dan Robinson – lighting designer and video content
- Lee Birchall – equipment
- Brian Phoenix – financier
- Paul Roberts – choreographer
- Francesca Hoffman, Emily Rumbles – dancers (2011–2012)

Band

- Theo Hutchcraft – vocal
- Adam Anderson – keyboards, guitar
- Pete Watson – keyboards, backing vocal
- Paul Walsham – drums, backing vocal
- Mark Pusey – drums, backing vocal (2010–2011)
- Richard Sidaway – backing vocal (2010–2011)
- Matt White – bass guitar (2011)
- Dave Marks – bass guitar (2011)
- Lael Goldberg – bass guitar, backing vocal (2012)
- Hilary Marsden – saxophone, clarinet, backing vocal (2010)
- Amy May – clarinet, saxophone, viola, backing vocal (2011–2012)
- Paloma Deike, Penny Anscow – violin, backing vocal (2011–2012)
- Rhian Porter – cello (2011–2012)
