= Hurts discography =

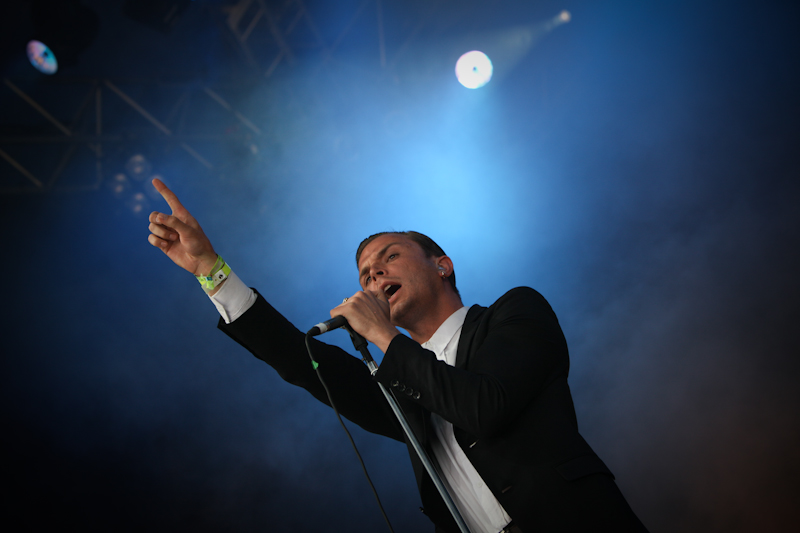
- Theo Hutchcraft of Hurts performing in June 2010
- Studio albums: 5
- Extended plays: 1
- Singles: 23
- Music videos: 23

English synth-pop duo Hurts have released five studio albums, one extended play, 23 singles (including one as a featured artist), one promotional single and 23 music videos. Originally formed as the Daggers, the band eventually reformed and changed their name to Hurts prior to being signed to Major Label and RCA Records in July 2009.

== Studio albums ==
List of studio albums, with selected chart positions, sales figures and certifications
| Title | Details | Peak chart positions | | | | | | | | | | Sales | Certifications |
| Title | Details | UK | AUT | BEL (FL) | DEN | FIN | GER | IRE | NL | SWE | SWI | Sales | Certifications |
|---|---|---|---|---|---|---|---|---|---|---|---|---|---|
| Happiness | Released: 27 August 2010; Label: Major Label, RCA; Formats: CD, LP, digital download | 4 | 2 | 11 | 7 | 3 | 2 | 9 | 18 | 4 | 2 | UK: 180,218 | BPI: Gold; BVMI: 2× Platinum; IFPI AUT: Gold; IFPI FIN: Gold; IFPI SWI: Platinum |
| Exile | Release: 8 March 2013; Label: Major Label, RCA; Formats: CD, LP, digital download | 9 | 4 | 24 | 31 | 2 | 3 | 34 | 20 | 17 | 2 | UK: 39,411 | BVMI: Gold; IFPI SWI: Gold |
| Surrender | Release: 9 October 2015; Label: Columbia; Formats: CD, LP, digital download | 12 | 14 | 17 | — | 13 | 8 | 48 | 30 | 47 | 1 | | |
| Desire | Released: 29 September 2017; Label: Columbia; Formats: CD, LP, digital download | 21 | 24 | 103 | — | 6 | 14 | — | 116 | — | 8 | | |
| Faith | Released: 4 September 2020; Label: Lento; Formats: CD, LP, cassette, digital download | 21 | 8 | 138 | — | — | 9 | — | 59 | — | 10 | | |
"—" denotes a recording that did not chart or was not released in that territory.

== Extended plays ==
| Title | Details |
|---|---|
| The Belle Vue EP | Released: 9 July 2010; Label: Major Label; Format: Digital download |

== Singles ==
=== As lead artist ===
List of singles as lead artist, with selected chart positions and certifications, showing year released and album name
| Title | Year | Peak chart positions | | | | | | | | | | Certifications | Album |
| Title | Year | UK | AUT | BEL (FL) | DEN | FIN | GER | IRE | NL | SWE | SWI | Certifications | Album |
|---|---|---|---|---|---|---|---|---|---|---|---|---|---|
| "Better Than Love" | 2010 | 50 | — | — (Note: "Better Than Love" did not enter the Ultratop 50, but peaked at number 12 on the Flemish Ultratip chart.) | — | — | 66 | — | 88 | — | 56 | | Happiness |
| "Wonderful Life" | 2010 | 21 | 6 | 27 | 8 | 15 | 2 | 38 | 83 | 30 | 4 | BVMI: 3× Gold; IFPI AUT: Gold; IFPI SWI: Platinum | Happiness |
| "Stay" | 2010 | 50 | 4 | — (Note: "Stay" did not enter the Ultratop 50, but peaked at number 14 on the Flemish Ultratip chart.) | — | — | 3 | — | — | — | 6 | BVMI: Gold; IFPI AUT: Gold; IFPI SWI: Gold | Happiness |
| "All I Want for Christmas Is New Year's Day" | 2010 | — | 67 | — | — | — | 66 | — | — | — | — | | Happiness |
| "Sunday" | 2011 | 57 | — | — (Note: "Sunday" did not enter the Ultratop 50, but peaked at number 20 on the Flemish Ultratip chart.) | — | — | — | — | — | — | — | | Happiness |
| "Illuminated"/"Better Than Love" | 2011 | 68 | — | — | — | — | — | — | — | — | — | | Happiness |
| "Blood, Tears & Gold" | 2011 | — | 45 | — | — | — | 39 | — | — | — | 54 | | Happiness |
| "Miracle" | 2013 | 120 | 43 | — (Note: "Miracle" did not enter the Ultratop 50, but peaked at number six on the Flemish Ultratip chart.) | — | — | 23 | — | — | — | 27 | | Exile |
| "Blind" | 2013 | 180 | 60 | — | — | — | 52 | — | — | — | — | | Exile |
| "Somebody to Die For" | 2013 | — | 57 | — (Note: "Somebody to Die For" did not enter the Ultratop 50, but peaked at number 85 on the Flemish Ultratip chart.) | — | — | 46 | — | — | — | 62 | | Exile |
| "Some Kind of Heaven" | 2015 | — | — | — | — | — | — | — | — | — | 66 | | Surrender |
| "Rolling Stone" | 2015 | — | — | — | — | — | — | — | — | — | — | | Surrender |
| "Lights" | 2015 | — | — | — | — | — | — | — | — | — | — | | Surrender |
| "Slow" | 2015 | — | — | — | — | — | — | — | — | — | — | | Surrender |
| "Wish" | 2015 | — | — | — | — | — | — | — | — | — | — | | Surrender |
| "Beautiful Ones" | 2017 | — | — | — | — | — (Note: "Beautiful Ones" did not enter the Finnish Singles Chart, but peaked at number 21 on the Finnish Download Chart.) | — | — | — | — | — | | Desire |
| "Ready to Go" | 2017 | — | — | — | — | — | — | — | — | — | — | | Desire |
| "Chaperone" | 2017 | — | — | — | — | — | — | — | — | — | — | | Desire |
| "Voices" | 2020 | — | — | — | — | — | — | — | — | — | — | | Faith |
| "Suffer" | 2020 | — | — | — | — | — | — | — | — | — | — | | Faith |
| "Redemption" | 2020 | — | — | — | — | — | — | — | — | — | — | | Faith |
| "Somebody" | 2020 | — | — | — | — | — | — | — | — | — | — | | Faith |
| "Wonderful Life" (with 6PM Records and Luciano featuring Sira) | 2024 | — | 2 | — | — | — | 1 | — | — | — | 1 | | Non-album single |
"—" denotes a recording that did not chart or was not released in that territory.

=== As featured artist ===
List of singles as featured artist, with selected chart positions and certifications, showing year released and album name
| Title | Year | Peak chart positions | | | | | | | | | | Certifications | Album |
| Title | Year | UK | AUT | BEL (FL) | DEN | FIN | GER | IRE | NL | SWE | SWI | Certifications | Album |
|---|---|---|---|---|---|---|---|---|---|---|---|---|---|
| "Under Control" (Calvin Harris and Alesso featuring Hurts) | 2013 | 1 | 21 | 42 | 28 | 5 | 24 | 5 | 59 | 8 | 34 | BPI: Platinum; GLF: Platinum; IFPI SWI: Gold | Motion and Forever |

=== Promotional singles ===
| Title | Year | Album |
|---|---|---|
| "Nothing Will Be Bigger Than Us" | 2015 | Surrender |

== Other charted songs ==
List of other charted songs, with selected chart positions, showing year released and album name
| Title | Year | Peaks | Album |
| Title | Year | GER | Album |
|---|---|---|---|
| "Ohne Dich" | 2013 | 88 | "Somebody to Die For" (single) |

== Guest appearances ==
List of non-single guest appearances, with other performing artists, showing year released and album name
| Title | Year | Other artist(s) | Album |
|---|---|---|---|
| "Jeanny" | 2010 | Falco | Falco 3 (25th Anniversary Edition) |
| "Haifisch" (Hurts Remix) | 2010 | Rammstein | Made in Germany 1995–2011 |
| "Ecstasy" | 2014 | Calvin Harris | Motion |

== Music videos ==
List of music videos, showing year released and directors
| Title | Year | Director | Ref. |
|---|---|---|---|
| "Wonderful Life" | 2009 | Hurts | |
| "Blood, Tears & Gold" | 2010 | Hurts | |
| "Better Than Love" | 2010 | W.I.Z. | |
| "Wonderful Life" (second version) | 2010 | Dawn Shadforth | |
| "Stay" | 2010 | Dave Ma | |
| "All I Want for Christmas Is New Year's Day" | 2010 | Diamond Dogs | |
| "Sunday" | 2011 | W.I.Z. | |
| "Illuminated" | 2011 | Giorgio Testi | |
| "Blood, Tears & Gold" (second version) | 2011 | Hurts | |
| "Miracle" (first version) | 2013 | Chris Turner | |
| "Miracle" (second version) | 2013 | Frank Borin | |
| "Blind" | 2013 | Nez Khammal | |
| "Somebody to Die For" | 2013 | Frank Borin | |
| "Under Control" (Calvin Harris and Alesso featuring Hurts) | 2013 | Emil Nava | |
| "Some Kind of Heaven" | 2015 | Chino Moya | |
| "Lights" | 2015 | Dawn Shadforth | |
| "Wish" | 2015 | Bryan Adams | |
| "Wings" | 2015 | Dawn Shadforth | |
| "Beautiful Ones" | 2017 | Tim Mattia | |
| "Ready to Go" | 2017 | Thomas James | |
| "Chaperone" | 2017 | Frederick Lloyd | |
| "Redemption" | 2020 | Frederick Lloyd | |
| "Somebody" | 2020 | Grandmas | |
