= Happiness (Hurts album) =

Studio album by Hurts
- Released: 27 August 2010
- Recorded: 2009–2010
- Studio: Sunshine Dance, Manchester; Pellerin, Gothenburg; Angel, London (Note: Strings on "The Water")
- Length: 48:02
- Label: Major Label; RCA
- Producer: Joseph Cross; Hurts; The Nexus; Jonas Quant

Hurts chronology
The Belle Vue EP (2010)	Happiness (2010)	Exile (2013)

Singles from Happiness
- 1. "Better Than Love" Released: 23 May 2010; 2. "Wonderful Life" Released: 22 August 2010; 3. "Stay" Released: 15 November 2010; 4. "All I Want for Christmas Is New Year's Day" Released: 13 December 2010; 5. "Sunday" Released: 27 February 2011; 6. "Illuminated" Released: 1 May 2011; 7. "Blood, Tears & Gold" Released: 7 October 2011

Happiness is the debut studio album by English musical duo Hurts. It was released on 27 August 2010 by RCA Records. It was preceded by the release of the singles "Better Than Love" on 23 May 2010 and "Wonderful Life" on 22 August 2010. Collaborators include Jonas Quant and production team The Nexus, as well as a duet with Australian singer Kylie Minogue on the song "Devotion". To promote the release of the album, the track "Happiness" was made available as a free download via Amazon.co.uk on 1 August 2010.

Happiness received mixed reviews from music critics. The album debuted at number four on the UK Albums Chart, selling 25,493 copies in its first week—the fastest-selling debut album of 2010 by a band in the United Kingdom. It reached number one on the Greek International Albums Chart, number two in Austria, Germany, Poland and Switzerland, and the top ten in Denmark, Finland, Ireland and Sweden. Happiness has sold 180,218 copies in the United Kingdom and over two million copies worldwide.

== Singles ==
"Better Than Love" was released as the lead single on 23 May 2010 in the United Kingdom. It spent one week at number 50 on the UK Singles Chart, and charted in Belgium, the Czech Republic and the Netherlands.

The second single, "Wonderful Life", was released on 22 August 2010 in the United Kingdom. It was previously released as the band's debut single in Denmark on 3 May 2010. According to lead singer Theo Hutchcraft, the song is about two extremes, "the first being a man who wants to kill himself and the second being love at first sight." The song debuted at number 21 in the United Kingdom, and peaked at number two in Germany. It reached the top 10 in Austria, Denmark and Switzerland.

"Stay" was released as the third single on 15 November 2010, and peaked at number 50 on the UK Singles Chart on 21 November 2010.

"All I Want for Christmas Is New Year's Day" was released as the fourth single on 13 December 2010 from the Deluxe edition bonus tracks in Happiness.

"Sunday" was released as the fifth single on 27 February 2011.

The album's sixth single, "Illuminated", was released on 1 May 2011 as a double A-side with a re-release of "Better Than Love".

"Blood, Tears & Gold" was released exclusively in Germany, Austria and Switzerland on 7 October 2011 as the album's seventh and final single.

== Critical reception ==
Professional ratings
Aggregate scores
Source	Rating
Metacritic	58/100
Review scores
Source	Rating
AllMusic	4/5 stars
Daily Express	positive
Drowned in Sound	5/10
The Guardian	2/5 stars
The Independent	3/5 stars
musicOMH	3/5 stars
NME	8/10
PopMatters	9/10
Q	2/5 stars
The Scotsman	3/5 stars

Happiness received mixed reviews from music critics. At Metacritic, which assigns a normalised rating out of 100 to reviews from mainstream critics, the album received an average score of 58, based on 9 reviews. Alexis Petridis of The Guardian wrote, "You get the feeling Hurts have spent more time making their backstory interesting than their music", and that on some tracks lead singer Hutchcraft sounds like "one of those puppets that advertises Dolmio, but in the throes of a romantic crisis". Dorian Lynskey of Q magazine also gave a mixed review, stating that the duo "learn all the wrong lessons from the 80s" and calling the album "a depressingly ordinary package of overblown melodies and musty lyrical cliches [...], expensively ribboned with choirs and orchestras." Teddy Jamieson of The Herald noticed that the band has "an ear for a hook, but Happiness feels very synthetic (and not in a fun, sci-fi way)" and that "beneath the synthy exterior lurk orthodox song structures, big choruses and a join-every-dot desperation for pop stardom", however he felt that "there are a couple of flashes of wit and intelligence buried in the album". Andrzej Lukowski of Drowned in Sound complimented the singles "Wonderful Life" and "Better Than Love", but felt that elsewhere the record is not "desperately fun" and found "the music thin" and "the embellishments desperately gauche".

Andy Gill of The Independent dubbed the album "efficient and stylish", but felt it "lacks innovation: music that moisturises a touch too much." Fiona Shepherd from The Scotsman said that the duo "look and sound out of time – and they probably like it that way" and described the album as "urbane but banal pop" with an occasional "21st century reference". Sam Shepherd of musicOMH stated that "there's a melancholy seam that runs throughout the album that, in conjunction with the polished production, succeeds in achieving a glacial grandeur to each of these songs" and noticed that "appalling ballads in the shape of 'The Water' and 'Unspoken' will almost certainly be overlooked in favour of the classy sounds of 'Wonderful Life' or the glorious pulsing anthem of 'Better Than Love'". Simon Gage of the Daily Express felt that the songs are "thoughtful, melancholy and very modern" and noticed that the album has "a real sense of style that's been missing in British pop for some time". Luke Lewis of NME praised the songs as "fearsomely well-crafted" and "as clean-lined and immaculate as a well-cut suitwrote" and described the album as "billowing, escapist nonsense that raises your heart rate, slaps a smile on your face and sounds godlike when drunk". Joe Copplestone of PopMatters said that the duo sings "simple lyrical messages of love, pain and yearning that most pop acts could not deliver sincerely if they tried" and claimed that they "have probably released the 'coolest' album of the year", giving it nine out of ten.

== Track listing ==
All lyrics are written by Hurts, except where noted.

No.	Title	Music	Producer(s)	Length
1.	"Silver Lining"	Hurts; The Nexus	Hurts; Jonas Quant; The Nexus^{[a]}	4:58
2.	"Wonderful Life"	Hurts; Joseph Cross	Hurts; Cross; Quant^{[a]}	4:14
3.	"Blood, Tears & Gold"	Hurts; The Nexus	Hurts; Quant; The Nexus^{[a]}	4:18
4.	"Sunday"	Hurts	Hurts; Quant	3:52
5.	"Stay"	Hurts	Hurts; Quant	3:55
6.	"Illuminated"	Hurts; The Nexus	Hurts; Quant; The Nexus^{[a]}	3:18
7.	"Evelyn"	Hurts	Hurts; Quant	3:54
8.	"Better Than Love"	Hurts; Cross	Hurts; Quant; Cross	3:33
9.	"Devotion" (featuring Kylie Minogue)	Hurts	Hurts; Quant	4:12
10.	"Unspoken"	Hurts	Hurts; Quant	4:46
11.	"The Water"	Hurts	Hurts	3:41
12.	"Verona" (hidden track, included at the end of track 11)	Hurts		2:14

Amazon MP3 UK bonus tracks
No.	Title	Music	Length
12.	"Better Than Love" (Tiefschwarz Mix)	Hurts; Cross	8:48
13.	"Better Than Love" (video)		4:11

Amazon MP3 Germany bonus tracks
No.	Title	Music	Length
12.	"Wonderful Life" (Freemasons Extended Mix)	Hurts; Cross	8:28

iTunes Store Germany bonus tracks
No.	Title	Music	Producer(s)	Length
12.	"Mother Nature"	Hurts; Andrew Frampton	Frampton	2:50
13.	"Wonderful Life" (Arthur Baker Remix)	Hurts; Cross		6:47
14.	"Wonderful Life" (new version) (video)			4:04
15.	"Better Than Love" (video)			4:11

Japanese edition bonus tracks
No.	Title	Music	Producer(s)	Length
12.	"Happiness"	Hurts		4:23
13.	"Affair"	Hurts	Cross	6:26
14.	"Mother Nature"	Hurts; Frampton	Frampton	2:50
15.	"Better Than Love" (Jamaica Remix)	Hurts; Cross		4:21
16.	"Wonderful Life" (Arthur Baker Remix – Kitsuné Version)	Hurts; Cross		10:04

Deluxe edition bonus tracks
No.	Title	Lyrics	Music	Producer(s)	Length
13.	"Affair"		Hurts	Cross	6:28
14.	"Happiness"		Hurts		3:26
15.	"Mother Nature"		Hurts; Frampton	Frampton	2:51
16.	"Confide in Me" (live studio version)	Owain Barton; Dave Seaman; Steve Anderson	Barton; Seaman; Anderson	Hurts	3:37
17.	"Sunday" (demo)		Hurts	Hurts; Quant	2:33
18.	"Devotion" (demo)		Hurts	Hurts; Quant	3:49
19.	"All I Want for Christmas Is New Year's Day"		Hurts	Hurts	4:34

Deluxe edition bonus DVD
No.	Title	Length
1.	"Intro" (live in Berlin)	2:33
2.	"Silver Lining" (live in Berlin)	4:46
3.	"Wonderful Life" (live in Berlin)	4:23
4.	"Happiness" (live in Berlin)	3:37
5.	"Blood, Tears & Gold" (live in Berlin)	4:27
6.	"Evelyn" (live in Berlin)	4:15
7.	"Sunday" (live in Berlin)	4:47
8.	"Verona" (live in Berlin)	2:20
9.	"Unspoken" (live in Berlin)	4:48
10.	"Mother Nature" (live in Berlin)	3:27
11.	"Devotion" (live in Berlin)	4:15
12.	"Confide in Me" (live in Berlin)	6:08
13.	"Illuminated" (live in Berlin)	4:08
14.	"Stay" (live in Berlin)	4:50
15.	"Gloomy Sunday" (live in Berlin)	3:06
16.	"Better Than Love" (live in Berlin)	5:30
17.	"Blood, Tears & Gold" (original version remastered)	4:35
18.	"Wonderful Life" (original music video)	4:15
19.	"Better Than Love" (music video)	4:22
20.	"Wonderful Life" (new version) (music video)	4:10
21.	"Stay" (music video)	3:48
22.	"Sunday" (music video)	4:02
23.	"Illuminated" (live version) (video)	3:31
24.	"All I Want for Christmas Is New Year's Day" (music video)	4:31

Notes

- ^{^[a]} signifies an additional producer

== Personnel ==
Credits adapted from the liner notes of Happiness.

=== Musicians ===
- Hurts – programming (tracks 1–9, 11); instruments (all tracks)
- Jonas Quant – programming (tracks 1, 3–10); instruments (tracks 1, 3–9); keyboards (track 10)
- The Nexus – programming, instruments (tracks 1, 3, 6)
- Stephen Kozmeniuk – guitars (track 1); additional guitars (track 4)
- Paulo Mendonça – backing vocals, choir (track 1); intro guitars (track 10)
- Hilary Marsden – saxophone, clarinet (track 2)
- Salome Kent – violin (track 3)
- Tina Sunnero – choir (track 5)
- Jennifer Götvall – choir (track 5)
- Karianne Arvidsson – choir (track 5)
- Malin Abrahamsson – choir (track 5)
- Johan Håkansson – drums (tracks 7, 10)
- Joseph Cross – all instruments, programming (track 8)
- Kylie Minogue – additional vocals (track 9)
- Simon Hale – string arrangements, string conducting (tracks 10, 11)
- The London Studio Orchestra – strings (tracks 10, 11)
- Perry Montague-Mason – orchestra leader (tracks 10, 11)

=== Technical ===
- Hurts – production
- Jonas Quant – production (tracks 1, 3–10); additional production (track 2)
- The Nexus – additional production (tracks 1, 3, 6)
- Joseph Cross – production (tracks 2, 8)
- Stephen Kozmeniuk – engineering (tracks 4, 5, 7, 10)
- Niall Acott – string recording (tracks 10, 11)
- Mark "Spike" Stent – mixing
- Matt Green – mixing assistance
- George Marino – mastering at Sterling Sound, New York City

=== Artwork ===
- Samuel Muir – design, "Silver Lining" illustration
- Laurence Ellis – cover photography
- Katja Ruge – Hurts live image
- Ali Tollervey – "Better Than Love" photo
- Pauly Spooner – "Sunday" photo
- Lindsay Bull – "Illuminated" painting

== Charts ==
=== Weekly charts ===
Chart (2010–11)	Peak position
Australian Albums (ARIA)	77
Austrian Albums (Ö3 Austria)	2
Belgian Albums (Ultratop Flanders)	11
Belgian Albums (Ultratop Wallonia)	34
Croatian Albums (HDU)	21
Czech Albums (ČNS IFPI)	22
Danish Albums (Hitlisten)	7
Dutch Albums (Album Top 100)	18
European Albums (Billboard)	6
Finnish Albums (Suomen virallinen lista)	3
French Albums (SNEP)	135
German Albums (Offizielle Top 100)	2
Greek International Albums (IFPI)	1
Irish Albums (IRMA)	9
Italian Albums (FIMI)	16
Japanese Albums (Oricon)	77
Polish Albums (ZPAV)	2
Scottish Albums (OCC)	6
Spanish Albums (PROMUSICAE)	47
Swedish Albums (Sverigetopplistan)	4
Swiss Albums (Schweizer Hitparade)	2
UK Albums (OCC)	4

=== Year-end charts ===
Chart (2010)	Position
Austrian Albums (Ö3 Austria)	59
European Albums (Billboard)	53
German Albums (Offizielle Top 100)	32
Polish Albums (ZPAV)	37
Swiss Albums (Schweizer Hitparade)	28
UK Albums (OCC)	164

Chart (2011)	Position
Austrian Albums (Ö3 Austria)	50
Finnish Albums (Suomen virallinen lista)	36
German Albums (Offizielle Top 100)	33
Swiss Albums (Schweizer Hitparade)	32
UK Albums (OCC)	164

== Certifications ==
Region	Certification	Certified units/sales
Austria (IFPI Austria)	Gold	10,000^{*}
Finland (Musiikkituottajat)	Platinum	20,168
Germany (BVMI)	2× Platinum	400,000^{^}
Poland (ZPAV)	2× Platinum	40,000^{*}
Russia (NFPF)	Gold	5,000^{*}
Switzerland (IFPI Switzerland)	Platinum	30,000^{^}
United Kingdom (BPI)	Gold	180,218
^{*} Sales figures based on certification alone.^{^} Shipments figures based on certification alone.

== Release history ==
Region	Date	Format(s)	Edition	Label	Ref.
Germany	27 August 2010	CD; digital download	Standard	Sony	
Ireland	3 September 2010	CD; digital download	Standard	Major Label; RCA	
Italy	3 September 2010	Digital download	Standard	Sony	
France	6 September 2010	Digital download	Standard	Sony	
Poland	6 September 2010	CD; digital download	Standard	Sony	
Sweden	6 September 2010	Digital download	Standard	Sony	
United Kingdom	6 September 2010	CD; digital download	Standard	Major Label; RCA	
Italy	7 September 2010	CD	Standard	Sony	
Sweden	8 September 2010	CD	Standard	Sony	
Australia	10 September 2010	CD; digital download	Standard	Sony	
Japan	3 November 2010	CD; digital download	Standard	Sony	
France	15 November 2010	CD	Standard	Sony	
Germany	19 November 2010	CD + LP	Standard	Sony; Four Music	
United States	4 October 2011	Digital download	Standard	RCA	
Germany	28 October 2011	CD + DVD; digital download	Deluxe	Sony	
France	31 October 2011	Digital download	Deluxe	Sony	
Sweden	31 October 2011	Digital download	Deluxe	Sony	
United Kingdom	31 October 2011	CD + DVD; digital download	Deluxe	Major Label; Epic	
Italy	1 November 2011	Digital download	Deluxe	Sony	
Sweden	2 November 2011	CD + DVD; digital download	Deluxe	Sony	
United States	4 November 2011	Digital download	Deluxe	Epic	
Italy	8 November 2011	CD + DVD	Deluxe	Sony	
