= Stay (Hurts song) =

Single by Hurts

from the album Happiness
- B-side: "Confide in Me"
- Released: 12 November 2010
- Recorded: Sunshine Studios (Manchester, England); Pellerin (Gothenburg, Sweden)
- Genre: Electropop
- Length: 3:55
- Label: Major Label; Sony; RCA
- Songwriter: Hurts
- Producers: Hurts; Jonas Quant

Hurts singles chronology
"Wonderful Life" (2010)	"Stay" (2010)	"All I Want for Christmas Is New Year's Day" (2010)

Music video
- "Hurts - Stay (Official Music Video)" on YouTube

"Stay" is a song by English musical duo Hurts from their debut album, Happiness. It was released as the album's third single in the United Kingdom on 15 November 2010. The song was included on the soundtrack of the German film Kokowääh.

== Reception ==
STAR Magazine gave the song 5 stars out of 5 and stated "We’re not quite sure how music so gloomy can still manage to be so bloody gorgeous. But this synth duo’s inspired way with a simple melody, romantic lyrics and Theo Hutchcraft’s richly heartfelt vocals somehow build this electro-pop ballad into a truly beautiful elegy to lost love. Stunning!".

== Music video ==
Model Anna Thora Alfreds and Theo Hutchcraft in the video.

The video, directed by Dave Ma and shot on locations in Iceland, depicts Hurts singer Theo Hutchcraft and Icelandic model/actress Anna Thora Alfreds as lovers facing the end of their relationship. The two characters – both smartly dressed – appear to emerge from the sea and then walk on a bleak shore under a grey sky, until only Theo features in the final scene, alone. The video is intercut with scenes of Hutchcraft and band-mate Adam Anderson performing inside a shed and Anderson playing the piano on the wind-battered beach of Vik (south Iceland), alongside a group of female dancers singing the backing vocals. Director Ma described how, on the day of the shooting, "the clouds rolled in as the perfect moody cover and everything looked amazing. But it was freezing, and the dancers, actress and Adam and Theo from Hurts did amazingly well to look somewhat composed in near subzero temperatures." During the filming of the last scene, Anna Thora broke and dislocated her knee cap and was nearly pulled out to sea after a wave hit her and Theo.

== Track listing ==
- CD single
1. "Stay" – 3:55
2. "Confide in Me" (Live from Reykjavik) – 3:53
- 7" single
1. "Stay" – 3:55
2. "Stay" (Groove Armada Remix) – 7:29
- Digital EP
1. "Stay" - 3:55
2. "Stay" (Groove Armada Remix) – 7:29
3. "Stay" (Full Intention Club Mix) – 6:10
- UK digital single
1. "Stay" (The Temper Trap Remix) – 4:25
- German digital EP
1. "Stay"
2. "Stay" (Groove Armada Remix)
3. "Stay" (Full Intention Club Mix)
4. "Stay" (Oliver Koletzki Remix)
- German CD-Single
1. "Stay"
2. "Stay" (Groove Armada Remix)
3. "Stay" (Full Intention Club Mix)
4. "Confide in Me" (Live from Reykjavik)

== Personnel ==
- Songwriting – Hurts
- Production, instruments, programming – Hurts, Jonas Quant
- Choir – Tina Sunnero, Jennifer Götvall, Karianne Arvidsson, Malin Abrahamsson

== Charts ==
=== Weekly charts ===
Chart (2010–11)	Peak position
Austria (Ö3 Austria Top 40)	4
Belgium (Ultratip Bubbling Under Flanders)	14
CIS Airplay (TopHit)	19
Finland (Suomen virallinen lista)	22
Germany (GfK)	3
Hungary (Rádiós Top 40)	20
Luxembourg Digital Songs (Billboard)	2
Poland Airplay (ZPAV)	2
Russia Airplay (TopHit)	25
Scotland Singles (OCC)	39
Slovakia Airplay (ČNS IFPI)	51
Switzerland (Schweizer Hitparade)	6
UK Singles (OCC)	50
Ukraine Airplay (TopHit)	56

=== Year-end charts ===
Chart (2011)	Position
Austria (Ö3 Austria Top 40)	39
Germany (Media Control Charts)	29
Russia Airplay (TopHit)	61
Switzerland (Schweizer Hitparade)	53
Ukraine Airplay (TopHit)	106

2012 year-end chart performance for "Stay"
Chart (2012)	Position
Russia Airplay (TopHit)	196
Ukraine Airplay (TopHit)	198

== Certifications ==
Region	Certification	Certified units/sales
Austria (IFPI Austria)	Gold	15,000^{*}
Germany (BVMI)	Gold	150,000^{^}
Switzerland (IFPI Switzerland)	Gold	15,000^{^}
^{*} Sales figures based on certification alone.^{^} Shipments figures based on certification alone.

== Release history ==
Region	Date	Format
Austria	12 November 2010	Digital download
Italy	12 November 2010	Digital download
Netherlands	12 November 2010	Digital download
Sweden	12 November 2010	Digital download
Ireland	12 November 2010	CD single; 7" single; digital download
United Kingdom	15 November 2010	CD single; 7" single; digital download
Germany	4 February 2011	Digital download
Germany	11 February 2011	CD single
