= All I Want for Christmas Is New Year's Day =

Single by Hurts

from the album Happiness (Deluxe Edition)
- Released: 13 December 2010
- Length: 4:34
- Label: Major Label; Sony; RCA
- Songwriter: Hurts
- Producer: Hurts

Hurts singles chronology
"Stay" (2010)	"All I Want for Christmas Is New Year's Day" (2010)	"Sunday" (2011)

Music video
- "Hurts – All I Want for Christmas Is New Year's Day" on YouTube

"All I Want for Christmas Is New Year's Day" is a song by British musical duo Hurts. In the first week of its release, the song was made as a free download on iTunes in the United Kingdom and Ireland, and was "Single of the Week". The single charted at number 67 in Austria.

== Background ==
Regarding the release of the song, Hurts declared in an interview that, "[i]t's about the worst Christmas of our lives, which we're releasing on the best Christmas of our lives. Also, we used previous cast members for the video, so it's like a Hurts Christmas party... in a cemetery."

== Critical reception ==
Fraser McAlpine wrote for BBC's Chart Blog that the song was "mournful" and "dignified", complimenting the "amazing" chorus and "the tubular bells, the sleighbells, the twinkling piano and the booming drums, and all of that mournful huffing, and it sounds both magical and deep." Digital Spy reviewer Robert Copsey rated "[t]he Christmas tearjerker" five stars, maintaining that it "blossoms into an uplifting anthem".

== Music video ==
The music video takes place in a graveyard, where the band members and other people (characters from the music videos for "Better Than Love", "Wonderful Life" and "Stay") gather around a grave, out of which a Christmas tree emerges.

== Charts ==
Chart (2010)	Peak position
Austria (Ö3 Austria Top 40)	67

Chart (2017–2025)	Peak position
Germany (GfK)	66
