= Blood, Tears & Gold =

Single by Hurts

from the album Happiness
- Released: 7 October 2011
- Studio: Sunshine (Manchester, England); Pellerin (Gothenburg, Sweden)
- Length: 4:18
- Label: Columbia; Sony
- Songwriters: Hurts; The Nexus; David Sneddon
- Producers: Hurts; Jonas Quant; The Nexus

Hurts singles chronology
| "Illuminated" (2011) | "Blood, Tears & Gold" (2011) | "Miracle" (2013) |

Music video
- "Hurts – Blood, Tears & Gold (Original Version Remastered)" on YouTube

"Blood, Tears & Gold" is a song by the British duo Hurts from their first album, Happiness. The song was co-written with David Sneddon and The Nexus and was released as the fourth single from the album in Germany.

== Music video ==
This is the second video which was shot by Hurts and published on YouTube at the beginning of 2010.

== Track listing ==
- German CD single
1. "Blood, Tears & Gold" – 4:18
2. "Blood, Tears & Gold" (Lotus Eaters on My Mind remix by Pantha du Prince) – 11:00
- German digital download
1. "Blood, Tears & Gold" – 4:18
2. "Blood, Tears & Gold" (Lotus Eaters on My Mind remix by Pantha du Prince) (ECHO Kritikerpreis Gewinner 2011)
3. "Blood, Tears & Gold" (Moonbootica remix) – 5:44
4. "Sunday" (Paul van Dyk remix)
5. "Blood, Tears & Gold" (video)

== Personnel ==
- Songwriting – Hurts, David Sneddon, James Bauer-Mein

== Charts ==
| Chart (2011) | Peak position |
|---|---|
| Austria (Ö3 Austria Top 40) | 45 |
| Switzerland (Schweizer Hitparade) | 72 |
