= Illuminated (song) =

Single by Hurts

from the album Happiness
- A-side: "Better Than Love"
- Released: 9 May 2011
- Studio: Sunshine (Manchester); Pellerin (Gothenburg, Sweden)
- Length: 3:18
- Label: Major Label; Sony; RCA
- Songwriters: Hurts; The Nexus
- Producers: Hurts; Jonas Quant; The Nexus

Hurts singles chronology
"Sunday" (2011)	"Illuminated" / "Better Than Love" (2011)	"Blood, Tears & Gold" (2011)

Music video
- "Hurts - Illuminated (Live Version)" on YouTube

"Illuminated" is a song by the British musical duo Hurts from their first album, Happiness, which was co-written with The Nexus. Initially charting on the UK Singles Chart at number 68 in September 2010 after a feature on Sky One's Unmissable Dramas promo, the track was released as a double A-side with "Better Than Love" as the fifth single from the album.

== Track listing ==
- Digital EP
1. "Better Than Love" – 3:30
2. "Better Than Love" (Freemasons Pegasus Mix Radio Edit) – 3:36
3. "Better Than Love" (Death in Vegas Acid Remix)
4. "Better Than Love" (Burns European Sex Remix) – 5:07
5. "Illuminated" – 3:19

== Charts ==
Chart (2010)	Peak position
UK Singles (OCC)	68
