= Better Than Love =

Single by Hurts

from the album Happiness
- B-side: "Mother Nature"
- Released: 23 May 2010
- Length: 3:32
- Label: Major Label; Sony; RCA
- Songwriter(s): Hurts; Joseph Cross
- Producer(s): Hurts; Joseph Cross; Jonas Quant

Hurts singles chronology
"Better Than Love" (2010)	"Wonderful Life" (2010)
"Sunday" (2011)	"Illuminated" / "Better Than Love" (2011)	"Blood, Tears & Gold" (2011)

Music video
- "Hurts - Better Than Love (Video)" on YouTube

"Better Than Love" is the debut single by British musical duo Hurts from their debut album, Happiness. It was released on 23 May 2010 in the United Kingdom, where it peaked at number 50 on the UK Singles Chart. It also charted in Belgium and the Netherlands. It was originally performed by Daggers, Theo and Adam's band before Hurts.

The song was re-released as a double A-side with "lluminated" on 1 May 2011.

== Music video ==
The music video, directed by W.I.Z, was uploaded onto Hurts' official YouTube channel on 28 April 2010, following a trailer uploaded the day before. Their first professionally made music video, it features Theo Hutchcraft and Adam Anderson in an audition hall surrounded by women dressed in similar attire to themselves. As Anderson plays piano, Hutchcraft watches the auditions in the reflection of the hall's mirror. The video was filmed in Bucharest, Romania, in Buftea studio along with Romanian actresses Laura Cosoi, Mădălina Ghiţescu and others. Cosoi also starred in the video for their later song "Sunday".

== Track listings ==
- CD single
1. "Better Than Love" (Radio Edit) – 3:32
2. "Mother Nature" – 2:50
- 7" vinyl
1. "Better Than Love" (Radio Edit) – 3:32
2. "Mother Nature" – 2:50
- iTunes single
1. "Better Than Love" (Radio Edit) – 3:32
2. "Better Than Love" (Jamaica Remix) – 4:19
- iTunes EP
1. "Better Than Love" (Radio Edit) – 3:32
2. "Better Than Love" (Tiefschwarz Mix) – 8:48
- German iTunes EP
1. "Better Than Love" (Album Version) – 3:33
2. "Better Than Love" (Live & Unplugged From BBC Radio 1's Live Lounge)
3. "Better Than Love" (Tiefschwarz Remix) – 8:48
4. "Better Than Love" (Burns European Sex Remix) – 5:06
5. "Better Than Love" (Freemasons Pegasus Mix [Radio Edit]) – 3:36
6. "Better Than Love" (Jamaica Remix) – 4:19
7. "Better Than Love" (Death in Vegas Acid Remix) – 8:14
- Italian CD single/12" vinyl
1. "Better Than Love" – 3:32
2. "Better Than Love" (Italoconnection Remix) – 5:14

== Personnel ==
- Hurts – lyrics, music, production
- Joseph Cross – music, production
- Jonas Quant – production
- Spike Stent – mixing

== Charts ==
Chart (2010–11)	Peak position
Belgium (Ultratip Bubbling Under Flanders)	12
Czech Republic (Rádio – Top 100)	54
Finland Download (Latauslista)	27
Germany (GfK)	66
Netherlands (Single Top 100)	88
Switzerland (Schweizer Hitparade)	56
UK Singles (OCC)	50
UK Dance (OCC)	6
