= Pavillon 21 MINI Opera Space =

Performance space in Munich

Coordinates: 48.14039°N 11.58127°E

Pavillon 21 MINI Opera Space, located on the Marstallplatz in Munich, is one of the performance spaces of the Bavarian State Opera. It was designed by Wolf Prix of the Austrian architectural firm, Coop Himmelb(l)au, at construction cost of € 2.1 million, supported by BMW/MINI. Built of aluminium in the form of multiple pyramids, it covers an area of 560 square metres and has a height of 12.5 meters. The structure, which has a seating capacity of 300, was designed to be easily dismantled and reconstructed for other uses and in other locations as required. It was inaugurated in June 2010 for the Munich Opera Festival.

== Sources ==
- Bavarian State Opera (16 November 2009 ). Präsentation des "Pavillon 21 MINI Opera Space" (in German)
- Hynes, Ruth (17 November 2009). "Pavilion 21 MINI Opera Space by Coop Himmelb(l)au". Dezeen
