= Fuzz Club =

Indie rock night

Coordinates: 53.381000°N 1.488100°W

The Fuzz Club was an indie rock night hosted by University of Sheffield Union of Students, which ran from 1999 to 2009. It claimed to be the biggest students union rock night in the UK outside London.

The night ran weekly on Thursdays throughout term time and hosts new bands; sometimes local, sometimes national. The club provided a variety of music from heavy rock in the Bleach room to indie in the main fuzz room.

The night was created by Penny Blackham, who is currently Chair of the South Yorkshire Music Board.

Fuzz Club was part of the circuit for new bands trying to make a name for themselves. In recent years, it had hosted Keane, The Long Blondes, Editors, The Zutons, The Killers, Bloc Party, The xx, La Roux, Future of the Left, British Sea Power, 65daysofstatic, Ida Maria, Hot Chip, Florence and the Machine and The Others.

In the mid-2000s, the club also hosted one day festivals, called Fuzztival with acts like Metronomy, Ebony Bones, Hot Chip and Toddla T on the line-up.

The club night ran since 1999 and initially alternated with Bleach, a heavier rock night, which instead became resident in the Fuzz Club's second room – essentially part of Fuzz Club. At the end of the academic year 2008/09, the last night of the Fuzz Club was held on 11 June 2009. The night has now been replaced with Live Wire, opening 23 September 2010.
