= Sunday (Hurts song) =

Single by Hurts

from the album Happiness
- B-side: "Live Like Horses"
- Released: 27 February 2011
- Studio: Sunshine (Manchester, England); Pellerin (Gothenburg, Sweden)
- Length: 3:52
- Label: Major Label; RCA
- Songwriter: Hurts
- Producers: Hurts; Jonas Quant

Hurts singles chronology
"All I Want for Christmas Is New Year's Day" (2010)	"Sunday" (2011)	"Illuminated" / "Better Than Love" (2011)

Music video
- "Hurts - Sunday" on YouTube

"Sunday" is a song by English musical duo Hurts. It was released on 27 February 2011 as the fourth single from their debut album, Happiness (2010). Despite the moderate chart success, the song received mixed response from critics, who complimented the sound of the song, but criticized the lyrics. Some of them called it flimsy and thought it was bland, and noted that the song has "lack of depth".

== Critical reception ==
"Sunday" received generally mixed reviews from music critics. Alix Buscovic of BBC Music described the song as a "power-dressed Europop floor-filler that channels early Depeche Mode and the PSB", which was made with "theatricality" and "a brooding demeanour", but criticized the lyrics. PopMatters reviewer Joe Copplestone compared the track to New Order, deeming it "gleefully era-authentic" and commending its commercial appeal.

While commenting on the "lack of depth" of the lyrics in Happiness, Sam Shepherd from musicOMH praised Anderson's work, with the song's mix of "Eastern Bloc industrial pomp with Eurovision disco-pop" having a "surprisingly engaging effect." In the Drowned in Sound review, Andrzej Lukowski considers "Sunday" to cross into "boyband territory", having "a decent hi-NRG synth line", nevertheless a "desperately gauche" feature. Similarly, Alexis Petridis from The Guardian felt it was "flimsy and commonplace", stating that, similar to the other albums tracks, it's a "climax" without any "build-up".

== Music video ==
The music video was directed by W.I.Z., who also directed the duo's first video, "Better Than Love" in 2010. It was filmed in Romania, at MediaPro Studios. Theo Hutchcraft stated that the video follows a similar theme to the group's others, adding "it's nice to go away to film the videos because you live in a different world for a few days[...] We go to an exotic, beautiful place, think of a theme that no-one else will understand except us, and surround us with women so people won't ask us what it's about!"

== Live performances ==
Hurts performed the single live at The Graham Norton Show, which was their first performance of the song on a television programme.

== Track listings ==
- CD single
1. "Sunday"
2. "Live Like Horses"
- 7" single
1. "Sunday"
2. "Sunday" (Seamus Haji Remix)
- Digital bundle
1. "Sunday"
2. "Sunday" (Seamus Haji Remix)
3. "Sunday" (Midland Remix)
4. "Sunday" (Tom Flynn Remix)
5. "Sunday" (Glam As You Radio Mix)

== Charts ==
Chart (2011–12)	Peak position
Belgium (Ultratip Bubbling Under Flanders)	20
Hungary (Single Top 40)	8
Romania (Romanian Top 100)	76
UK Singles (OCC)	57
