= Hurts (duo) =

English synthpop duo

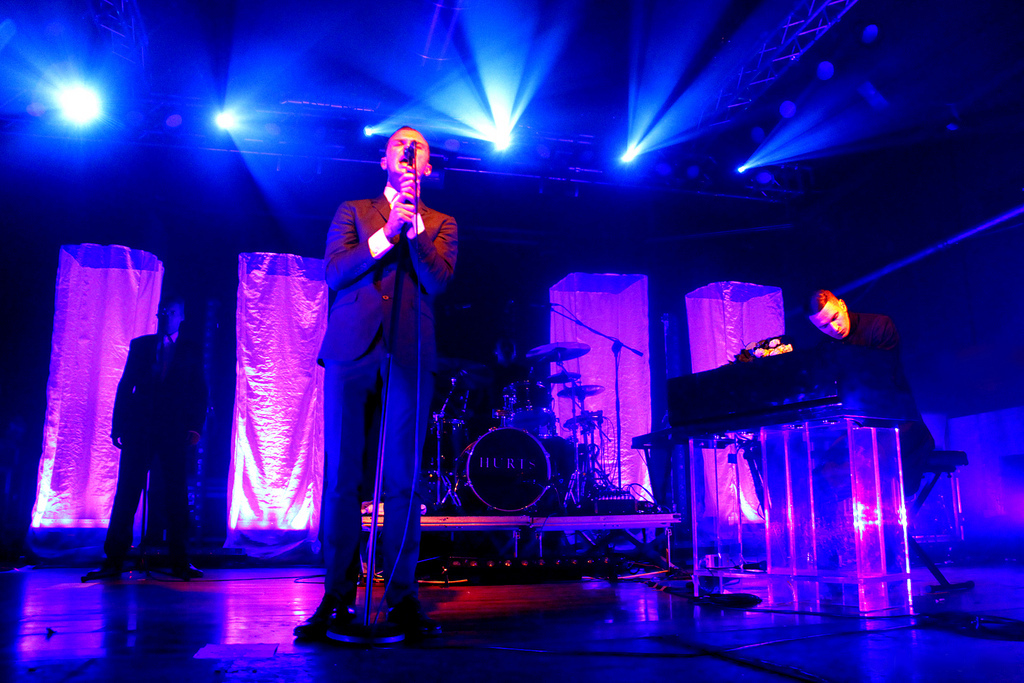
- Hurts performing live in 2010

Background information
- Origin: Manchester, England
- Genres: Synth-pop; electropop; pop rock
- Years active: 2009–present
- Labels: Columbia; RCA
- Members: Theo Hutchcraft; Adam Anderson
- Website: informationhurts.com

Hurts are an English electronic musical duo formed in Manchester in 2009, consisting of singer Theo Hutchcraft and multi-instrumentalist Adam Anderson. They have released five studio albums: Happiness (2010), Exile (2013), Surrender (2015), Desire (2017) and Faith (2020). Their first two albums reached the top 10 in several countries.

== History ==
=== 2005–2008: Beginnings ===
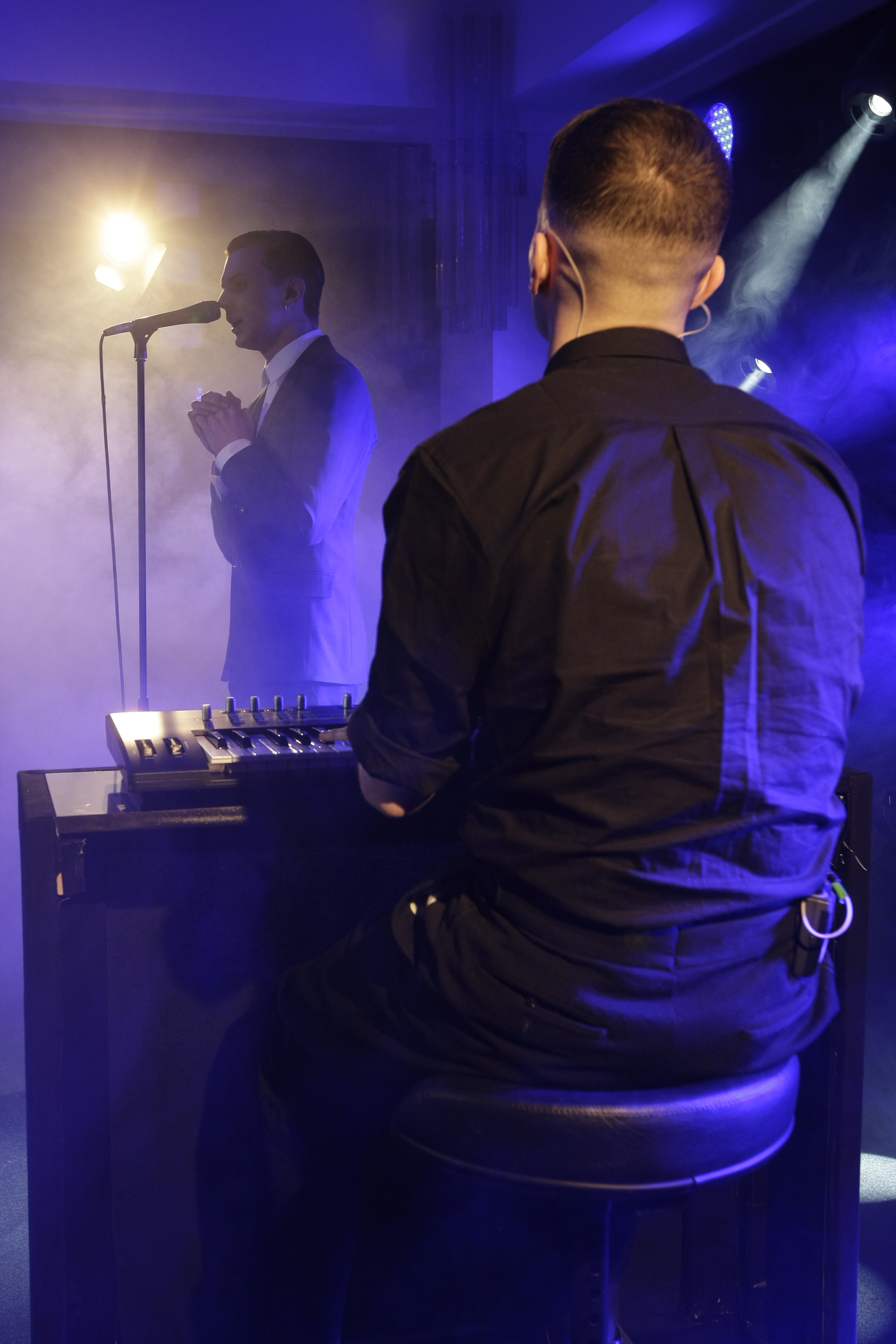
Hurts performing in January 2010

Theo Hutchcraft (born 30 August 1986 in Richmond, North Yorkshire) and Adam Anderson (born 14 May 1984 in Manchester) met outside Manchester's 42nd Street nightclub in November 2005, standing by while their friends got involved in a fight. Too drunk to join in, they began discussing music instead; realising they had similar tastes, they decided to start a band. Over the next few months, they exchanged music and lyrics via e-mail, before forming Bureau in March 2006. They performed their first gig as a quintet in May at The Music Box in Manchester, and were shortly afterwards signed to independent record label High Voltage Sounds. They released their first double A-side single "After Midnight"/"Dollhouse" in November, which was made Single of the Week on Xfm. In 2007, Bureau disbanded and Hutchcraft and Anderson formed the band Daggers soon after. They signed to Label Fandango and in October released another double A-side single, "Money"/"Magazine", which, despite failing to chart, was nominated for the Popjustice £20 Music Prize.

Throughout 2008, Daggers continued to build a following and began working with producers Biff Stannard and Richard X, but after a disastrous A&R showcase in London in September, Theo and Adam returned to Manchester to reflect on the band's future. They recorded a mournful ballad called "Unspoken" together and they immediately realised that this was the sound that they wanted to develop as a duo. After informing the rest of the band that it was finished, they went on a short break to Verona in Italy, where they claim they discovered a musical genre called "Disco Lento". Daggers split on 30 January 2009.

=== 2009–2012: Happiness ===
Now called Hurts, the duo recorded an amateur music video for a song called "Wonderful Life", with a female dancer who had responded to an advert they placed in a post office in Manchester. After they uploaded the video to their YouTube channel on 21 April 2009, it quickly went viral and has since had over 103 million views.

In his book 'Albion's Secret History: Snapshots of England's Pop Rebels and Outsiders' Guy Mankowski wrote a chapter on Hurts, claiming they 'deftly created a European mythology of their own with their debut video for the single 'Wonderful Life'. In July, the band was signed to Sony subsidiary RCA Records as well as RCA imprint Major Label Records, run by their old friend Biff Stannard. Influences on the group included David Bowie, Kraftwerk, Pet Shop Boys, New Order and OMD.

Although Hutchcraft and Anderson had decided to not do any gigs until they had enough songs, they began uploading demos to their Myspace page, and on 27 July 2009, they were named Band of the Day by The Guardian. On 7 December, they made the longlist of the Sound of 2010, an annual poll of music critics and industry figures conducted by the BBC. Following spot plays on BBC Radio 1 of "Wonderful Life", Hurts were invited to record at London's Maida Vale Studios on 9 December for Huw Stephens' radio show, where they performed "Illuminated" and "Silver Lining".

2010 began with Hurts finishing fourth on the Sound of 2010 poll, behind Ellie Goulding, Marina and the Diamonds, and Delphic. On 7 January, Zane Lowe premiered the song "Blood, Tears & Gold" as his "Hottest Record in the World", and another self-made music video debuted online three days later. Having released a limited edition 12" vinyl picture disc of the Arthur Baker remix of "Wonderful Life" on 18 January, Hurts performed their first ever gig as Hurts on 22 January at the Michalsky Stylenite in Berlin, followed by St Phillips Church in Salford on 22 February. This was quickly followed by gigs at Wiltons Music Hall, London, and in Berlin and Cologne in Germany.

In March, "Wonderful Life" was released to radio in various European territories; as manager Matt Vines explained to Music Week, the aim was to launch the band simultaneously across Europe and Asia. "It's an internationally focused campaign. We're looking at tours across Europe to back up the work we are doing in the UK." The single became a radio hit in countries such as Denmark, Cyprus and Russia throughout the spring. On 10 March, their first UK single "Better Than Love" was premiered on Huw Stephens' show on BBC Radio 1. After a nationwide tour with the NME Radar tour, the song was released on digital download, CD and vinyl formats on 24 May, and debuted at number 50 on the UK Singles Chart.

Following success on Greek radio, Hurts were invited to perform at the MAD Video Music Awards ceremony in Athens in front of 11,000 people on 15 June. Also in June, Kylie Minogue recorded a verse and backing vocals for the song "Devotion", which was to be included on the band's album. Hurts recorded a performance of Kylie's 1994 hit "Confide in Me" for newspaper The Sun's website, and has since been a regular inclusion on their gig setlists. Kylie later returned the compliment by recording a performance of "Wonderful Life" in Radio 1's Live Lounge.

Throughout the summer, Hurts performed at several music festivals including V Festival and T in the Park in the UK, Pukkelpop in Belgium, and SWR3 New Pop Festival in Germany. "Wonderful Life" was released in Germany on 6 August and it debuted at number two on the German Singles Chart. It was released in the UK on 23 August, where it debuted at number 21, becoming their first UK top 40 hit. The album Happiness, which had been recorded at Sunshine Dance Studios in Manchester and Pellerin in Gothenburg with producer Jonas Quant, was released on 6 September. It debuted at number four in the UK Albums Chart, selling 25,000 copies in its first week on sale, which made it the fastest selling debut album by a band in 2010.

In October, Hurts embarked on their first full headline UK tour, performing in Brighton, Leeds, Glasgow, Manchester, Birmingham, Bristol, and London. Their third UK single "Stay" was released in November, reaching number 50 in the chart. Meanwhile, in Germany, "Wonderful Life" was certified platinum for sales in excess of 500,000 copies, and they were awarded the BAMBI award for Best International Newcomer. They were also nominated at the MTV Europe Music Awards in the Best Push Artist category. Hurts ended 2010 by supporting Scissor Sisters on their UK arena tour in December, and released a Christmas single called "All I Want for Christmas Is New Year's Day" for free download on iTunes.

Happiness climbed back into the UK Top 30 albums chart in February 2011 following a second nationwide headline tour, several TV appearances including on The Graham Norton Show, and winning Best New Band at the NME Awards on 23 February, where they also performed "Wonderful Life". A fourth single from the album, "Sunday", was released in the UK on 27 February and it debuted at number 57, whilst the second single in Germany, "Stay", reached number three. In March, Hurts were awarded Best International Newcomer at the ECHO Awards in Germany. A fifth single, "Illuminated", was released in the UK on 9 May, entering the chart at number 159, though it had already reached number 68 in September 2010, following its use on trailers for television channel Sky1.

On 26 June, Theo and Adam performed on the John Peel stage at the Glastonbury Festival, and their full set was broadcast on a loop on the BBC Red Button channel. Readers of music magazine NME voted their performance as the best of the festival, putting them ahead of headliners U2, Coldplay, and Beyoncé. They were later voted "Band of the Summer" by the same magazine. In June 2011 they announced a remix of the track "Lonely Lisa" by French singer Mylène Farmer.

"Blood, Tears & Gold" was released as the third single in Germany on 7 October, peaking at number 39. A deluxe CD/DVD edition of Happiness was released on 31 October. The album eventually sold 400,000 copies in Germany, earning it double platinum status. It sold 150,000 copies in the United Kingdom, and spent a year on the UK Top 200 albums chart.

Hurts embarked on their first full European tour in October 2011, performing in Ukraine, Czech Republic, Poland, Germany, Lithuania, Estonia, Finland, Russia, Belarus, Serbia, Croatia, Italy, Greece, Austria, Switzerland, North Macedonia, and the UK. They said in interviews that they planned to start writing and recording for their second album after they have completed the tour, but that they might find it more difficult than their first. On 4 November 2011, Hurts played their last show of their 'Happiness Tour' at Brixton Academy where Kylie Minogue joined them on stage to perform "Devotion" and "Confide in Me". Hurts have confirmed more festival shows for summer 2012. In 2012, Hurts played the Summerwell Festival, Romania (11 August), Open Air Zofingen, Switzerland (12 August) and the Pildyk Friends Festival, Lithuania (14 August).

=== 2012–2017: Exile and Surrender ===
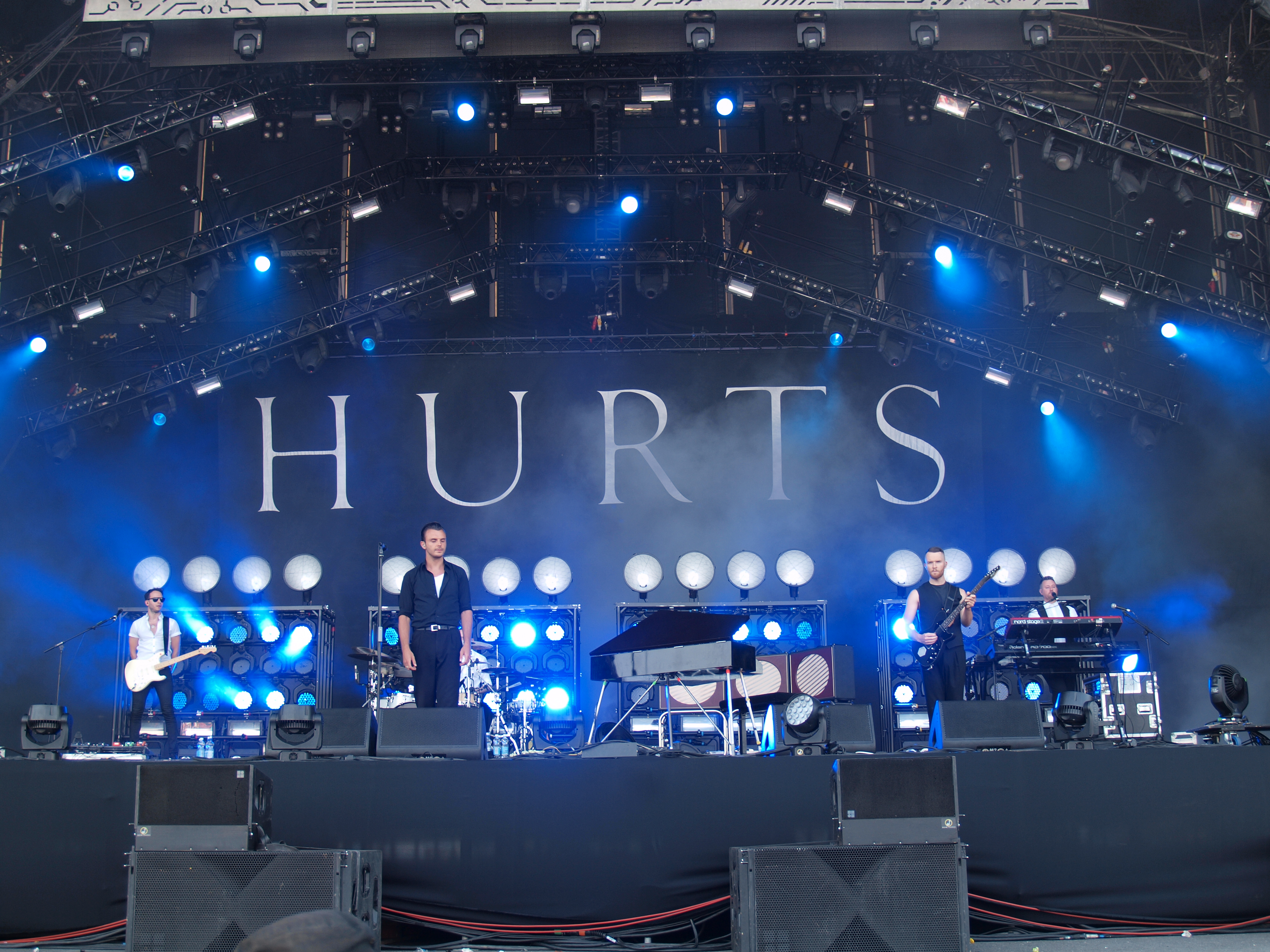
Hurts performing in July 2014

In September 2012, Hurts confirmed that recording of their next album was underway, with producer Jonas Quant. A video-teaser on iTunes contained a new track from Exile called "The Road", which was released on 14 December 2012 on YouTube. In autumn 2013 the video got a nomination for UK Music Video Awards as the Best Music Ad – TV or Online. An audio-only video of "The Road" was also uploaded.

The lead single from the album, "Miracle", premiered on BBC Radio 1 on 4 January 2013. A music video directed by Chris Turner was uploaded to YouTube on 4 February, but was permanently removed shortly after. A second video was shot and appeared online on 28 February. The single reached number 23 in Germany and number 120 in the UK. Exile was released on 8 March 2013, achieving a top ten position in ten countries worldwide, debuting at number three in Germany and number nine in the UK. "Blind" was released as the second single on 20 May, and "Somebody to Die For" followed as the third on 21 July. With the release of "Somebody to Die for" they included a cover version of "Ohne Dich" from the German band Selig. The band continued their Exile Tour across Europe in October and November 2013 and March 2014.

In May 2015, Hurts released a new single titled "Some Kind of Heaven". The release was produced with long-term collaborator Jonas Quant. On 6 October 2015, Hurts released the music video for "Wish", directed by Bryan Adams. Surrender was released on 9 October 2015. At the end of the tour for the album, Hurts released a video for the song "Nothing Will be Bigger Than Us". The video consisted of live concert footage of the Surrender tour in Moscow and London.

=== 2017–present: Desire and Faith ===
"Beautiful Ones", the first single from Desire, was released on 21 April 2017, the one-year anniversary of the death of American musician Prince, whom Hurts have cited as an inspiration. The song is assumed to be inspired by the Prince song "The Beautiful Ones" from his 1984 album Purple Rain. The music video was shot in Kyiv and was released on the same day as the single. The video, which plays in reverse, features Hutchcraft as a drag queen who is chased and beaten by a group of men after he rejects one of their advances in a nightclub. On 1 September, the band released another single, "Ready to Go". The video was filmed in Horwich near Hutchcraft's home city of Manchester. On 22 September, a single titled "Hold On to Me" was released. Desire was released on 29 September 2017. During the tour for the album, Hurts liked the welcome they received from fans in Russia so much that they extended the tour to include a return to Russia at the end of it. The second part of the tour also saw the duo perform in Taiwan, South Korea, Japan, and China. The final concert took place in Bucharest on 22 September 2018.

In May 2020, Hurts blacked out their pictures on their social media profiles and posted links to a Telegram profile, on which they released puzzles leading to the release of a lyric video for "Voices", the first single from their upcoming fifth album. With lyrics inspired by "isolation, desperation, and mania", Hutchcraft said that "Voices" had become "oddly prescient" during the COVID-19 pandemic. On 24 June, they revealed that the upcoming album would be titled Faith and released its second single, "Suffer". On 16 July, they released a third single called "Redemption" and announced that the album would be released on 4 September.

In July 2023, they organised several concerts Europewide. It was the band's first activity since COVID-19 pandemic and first public performances taken part since 2018 while performing tracks from theirs newest album "Faith".

In January 2024, a rap version of "Wonderful Life", credited to 6PM RECORDS x Luciano x Hurts x SIRA, debuted at number one on the German Singles Chart.

In summer 2026 Hurts toured across Europe and Central Asia, performing in Königstein, Kaunas, Tallinn, Warsaw, Locarno, Almaty, Prague, and Bucharest. The shows featured only Theo Hutchcraft on stage, as Adam Anderson had stepped back from live performances in 2025 due to health reasons.

== Concert tours ==
Headlining

- NME Radar Tour (2010)
- Happiness Tour (2010–2012)
- Exile Tour (2013–2015)
- Art on Ice Tour (2014)
- Surrender Tour (2016)
- Desire Tour (2017–2018)
- Faith Tour (2021– cancelled)

Opening act

- The Night Work Tour – Scissor Sisters Tour (2010)

== Discography ==
- Happiness (2010)
- Exile (2013)
- Surrender (2015)
- Desire (2017)
- Faith (2020)
