= Wonderful Life (Hurts song) =

Single by Hurts

from the album Happiness
- B-side: "Affair"
- Released: 3 May 2010
- Recorded: 2009
- Genre: Synthpop
- Length: 4:15
- Label: Major Label; RCA
- Songwriters: Hurts; Joseph Cross
- Producers: Hurts; Joseph Cross; Jonas Quant

Hurts singles chronology
"Better Than Love" (2010)	"Wonderful Life" (2010)	"Stay" (2010)

Music video
- "Hurts - Wonderful Life (Original Video)" on YouTube

Music video
- "Hurts - Wonderful Life (New Version)" on YouTube

"Wonderful Life" is a song by British musical duo Hurts from their debut album, Happiness. It was released as their debut single in Denmark on 3 May 2010 and was released as their second single in the United Kingdom on 22 August 2010. "Wonderful Life" peaked at number 21 on the UK Singles Chart. Outside the United Kingdom, "Wonderful Life" topped the charts in Poland and peaked within the top ten of the charts in Austria, Denmark, Germany, Israel and Switzerland. It also charted in Belgium.

== Background ==
In an interview with entertainment website Digital Spy, lead singer Theo Hutchcraft said of "Wonderful Life": "It's basically based on two extremes: the first being a man who wants to kill himself and the second being love at first sight. He's standing on the bridge about to jump and he's stopped by a woman. They see each other and fall in love. She basically says, 'Come with me, it's all going to be fine'. The song only offers a snippet of someone's life, so we don't know what happens at the end of it."

== Critical reception ==
"Wonderful Life" was well received from music critics. Digital Spy gave the song five out of five stars writing: "Over noirishly simmering synths, frontman Theo Hutchcraft tells the story of a suicidal man saved from jumping off the Severn Bridge by the strike of love at first sight. The rest, quite frankly, speaks for itself. Classy video? Check. Haunting vocals? You got 'em. Epic instrumental breakdown two-thirds of the way through? Seriously, it's all here." The Guardian reviewer Paul Lester wrote: "Wonderful Life is a heart-piercing future classic. Close your eyes and you're transported back to 1987, with the pristine production and melodies." Fraser McAlpine of BBC Chart Blog gave the song four out of five stars and described it as a sad song with "bitterly optimistic lyrics". Brent DiCrescenzo from Time Out Chicago gave "Wonderful Life" four out of five stars and called it "immaculately crafted, melodramatic pop".

Sarah Walters of City Life gave the song three out of five stars. She felt the song was "a product of the 1980s", and wrote, "There are countless debts in here: the sentimental synth of the Pet Shop Boys or Fiction Factory, the dancefloor savvy of The Beloved, the emotional lyrical arch China Crisis or the dashes of saxophone used by Spandau Ballet and Black". (Coincidentally, Black had a hit with a song of the same title.) Tim Sendra of AllMusic noted a "wonderfully retro" track that resembles "OMD meets Pet Shop Boys". Chris Maguire of AltSounds gave a mixed review: "It isn't ground-breaking by any means but it is a good example of pop music done well. Sure the lyrics aren't the greatest [...] but the chorus is good and will rattle around in your brain for quite a few hours after you have finished listening to it."

In his book 'Albion's Secret History: Snapshots of England's Pop Rebels and Outsiders' Guy Mankowski wrote a chapter about the song, commenting that Hurts 'deftly created a European mythology of their own with their debut video for the single 'Wonderful Life'. Within four minutes they created an evocative visual landscape, rich with reference points, which proved that even in the contemporary era Europe retained a sense mystique for the English.'

== Track listing ==
- Danish digital download
1. "Wonderful Life" – 4:14
- UK CD single
1. "Wonderful Life" – 4:16
2. "Affair" – 6:26
- UK digital download
1. "Wonderful Life" (Radio Edit) – 3:34
2. "Wonderful Life" (Mantronix Remix) – 5:11
3. "Wonderful Life" (Arthur Baker Remix) – 6:43
4. "Wonderful Life" (Freemasons Remix Radio Edit) – 3:23
5. "Wonderful Life" (Freemasons Extended Mix) – 8:28
- UK 7" vinyl
1. "Wonderful Life" – 4:16
2. "Wonderful Life" (Mantronix Remix) – 5:11
- UK 12" picture vinyl
1. "Wonderful Life" (Arthur Baker Remix) – 6:43
2. "Wonderful Life" (Arthur Baker Remix Instrumental)
- German digital download
1. "Wonderful Life" – 4:16
2. "Wonderful Life" (Arthur Baker Remix) – 6:43
3. "Wonderful Life" (Lexy Remix) – 7:22
4. "Wonderful Life" (Mantronix Remix) – 5:11
- German CD single
1. "Wonderful Life" – 4:14
2. "Wonderful Life" (Arthur Baker Remix) – 6:43
- Wonderful Life '25
1. "Wonderful Life '25" (with Purple Disco Machine) – 2:58
2. "Wonderful Life '25" (with Purple Disco Machine - Extended) – 5:39

== Personnel ==
- Hurts – lyrics, music, production
- Joseph Cross – music, production
- Jonas Quant – additional production
- Spike Stent – mixing
- George Marino – mastering

== Charts ==
=== Weekly charts ===
Chart (2010)	Peak position
Austria (Ö3 Austria Top 40)	6
Belgium (Ultratop 50 Flanders)	27
Belgium (Ultratip Bubbling Under Wallonia)	8
CIS Airplay (TopHit)	3
Czech Republic Airplay (ČNS IFPI)	15
Denmark (Tracklisten)	8
Europe (European Hot 100 Singles)	10
Finland (Suomen virallinen lista)	15
Germany (GfK)	2
Greece Digital (Billboard)	6
Hungary (Rádiós Top 40)	4
Ireland (IRMA)	38
Israel International Airplay (Media Forest)	2
Luxembourg Digital (Billboard)	5
Netherlands (Single Top 100)	83
Poland Airplay (ZPAV)	1
Poland Dance (ZPAV)	37
Russia Airplay (TopHit)	4
Scottish Singles Sales (Official Charts)	30
Slovakia Airplay (ČNS IFPI)	14
Sweden (Sverigetopplistan)	30
Switzerland (Schweizer Hitparade)	4
UK Singles (Official Charts)	21
Ukraine Airplay (TopHit)	12

Weekly chart performance for "Wonderful Life '25"
Chart (2025—2026)	Peak position
Belarus Airplay (TopHit)	128
CIS Airplay (TopHit)	29
Croatia International Airplay (Top lista)	46
Estonia Airplay (TopHit)	98
Germany Airplay (BVMI)	3
Germany (Deutsche Dance Charts)	1
Hungary (Dance Top 40)	5
Hungary (Rádiós Top 40)	1
Italy Airplay (EarOne)	61
Kazakhstan Airplay (TopHit)	74
Latvia Airplay (TopHit)	2
Lithuania Airplay (TopHit)	1
Moldova Airplay (TopHit)	2
North Macedonia Airplay (Radiomonitor)	14
Romania Airplay (UPFR)	4
Romania Airplay (Media Forest)	4
Romania TV Airplay (Media Forest)	15
Russia Airplay (TopHit)	33
Serbia Airplay (Radiomonitor)	10
Slovakia Airplay (ČNS IFPI)	7
Slovenia Airplay (Radiomonitor)	14

=== Monthly charts ===
Monthly chart performance for "Wonderful Life '25"
Chart (2025–2026)	Peak position
CIS Airplay (TopHit)	33
Latvia Airplay (TopHit)	21
Lithuania Airplay (TopHit)	2
Moldova Airplay (TopHit)	3
Romania Airplay (TopHit)	5
Russia Airplay (TopHit)	36

=== Year-end charts ===
Chart (2010)	Position
Austria (Ö3 Austria Top 40)	29
Europe (European Hot 100 Singles)	50
Germany (Media Control Charts)	8
Hungary (Rádiós Top 40)	71
Russia Airplay (TopHit)	4
Switzerland (Schweizer Hitparade)	31

Chart (2011)	Position
Hungary (Rádiós Top 40)	91
Israel Airplay (Media Forest)	6
Russia Airplay (TopHit)	46
Ukraine Airplay (TopHit)	40

2012 year-end chart performance for "Wonderful Life"
Chart (2012)	Position
Russia Airplay (TopHit)	186
Ukraine Airplay (TopHit)	124

Year-end chart performance for "Wonderful Life '25"
Chart (2025)	Position
CIS Airplay (TopHit)	89
Hungary (Dance Top 40)	65
Hungary (Rádiós Top 40)	35
Latvia Airplay (TopHit)	13
Lithuania Airplay (TopHit)	28
Moldova Airplay (TopHit)	17
Romania Airplay (TopHit)	113
Russia Airplay (TopHit)	96

== Certifications ==
Region	Certification	Certified units/sales
Austria (IFPI Austria)	Gold	15,000^{*}
Germany (BVMI)	3× Gold	450,000^{^}
Switzerland (IFPI Switzerland)	Platinum	30,000^{^}
^{*} Sales figures based on certification alone.^{^} Shipments figures based on certification alone.

== Release history ==
Region	Date	Format
Denmark	3 May 2010	Digital download
Germany	30 July 2010	Digital download
Germany	6 August 2010	CD single
United Kingdom	22 August 2010	Digital download
United Kingdom	23 August 2010	CD single
Worldwide (Purple Disco remixes)	23 May 2025	download, streaming
