= Confide in Me =

1994 single by Kylie Minogue

Single by Kylie Minogue

from the album Kylie Minogue
- B-side: "Nothing Can Stop Us"; "If You Don't Love Me"
- Released: 29 August 1994
- Studio: DMC, Sarm West (London, England); Minogue's home (Chelsea, London)
- Genre: Indie pop; trip hop
- Length: 5:54; 4:26 (radio mix)
- Label: Deconstruction; Mushroom; Imago
- Songwriters: Steve Anderson; Dave Seaman; Owain Barton
- Producer: Brothers in Rhythm

Kylie Minogue singles chronology
"Celebration" (1992)	"Confide in Me" (1994)	"Where Is the Feeling?" (1994)

Music video
- "Confide in Me" on YouTube

Music video
- "Confide in Me" in rock version, live from 2011 performance with Hurts on YouTube

Music video
- "Confide in Me" in opera-style, live from 2025 Tension Tour. on YouTube

"Confide in Me" is a song by Australian singer Kylie Minogue from her self-titled fifth studio album (1994). It was released as the album's lead single on 29 August 1994 by Deconstruction, Imago, and Mushroom Records. The track was written by Steve Anderson, Dave Seaman, and Owain Barton, whilst production was handled by British trio Brothers in Rhythm. It was recorded in London, United Kingdom at DMC and Sarm West Studios. Musically, it is a pop song that incorporates elements of indie music, dance-pop, trip hop, and Middle Eastern instrumentation such as strings and percussion. The lyrical content is about Minogue's earnest attempts at seduction and manipulation of people to convince them to confide in her.

Upon its release, "Confide in Me" received universal acclaim from music critics. Several critics selected the track as a standout from many of her records and compilation, whilst individual reviews commended Minogue's vocals, the production and influence of Middle Eastern elements. The track received nominations at some award ceremonies, along with being listed on critic's year-end lists. Commercially, the track experienced success in regions like Australia, United Kingdom, Scotland, Ireland, France, and New Zealand. It also became Minogue's only charting single in the US during the 1990s period, having peaked at 39 on the US Billboard Dance Club Songs chart.

An accompanying music video was directed by Paul Boyd in Los Angeles, California during July 1994; it featured six different videos of Minogue in a commercial to help the audience confide their numerous problems to each character. The song has been performed on several of Minogue's concerts, and most recently on her 2025 Tension tour in an opera-style version. "Confide in Me" was nominated in the category for Best Single at the 1995 Smash Hits Awards. It has been noted by critics and publications as one of the most iconic and innovative singles from the 1990s era, and Minogue's singles history, and has been recognised by authors as an important period of Minogue's career and musical "re-inventions". Alongside this, it has been sampled and covered by musicians, and used in several media.

== Background and production ==
"'Confide in Me' without a shadow of a doubt is the best Kylie track we were involved with. It's the thing I am most proud of professionally – the whole process from start to finish. It's the track that really sort of took her to the next level."

—Producers Brothers in Rhythm commenting on the song's production.

After Minogue's previous single release, her cover version of the Kool and the Gang's track "Celebration" with the record label PWL, she left them and signed a contract to United Kingdom dance label Deconstruction Records in 1993. During her time with PWL, she felt that her producers, the British trio Stock Aitken Waterman was treating her "very much [like] a puppet in the beginning. I was blinkered by my record company. I was unable to look left or right". "Confide in Me" was written by Steve Anderson, Dave Seaman, and Owain Barton, whilst production was handled by British trio Brothers in Rhythm, whom the former two writers are members of.

According to British author Sean Smith, who wrote a biography detailing Minogue's career, Brothers in Rhythm had developed a demo version of the song in just under an hour, and Minogue has been travelling to her Chelsea, London home. Minogue was contacted by the members of Brothers in Rhythm to record the track, so she went to their homebase to record the track in one take. Seaman was surprised with the development process, stating to Smith; "It just all kind of flowed out and slotted into place, which is usually the case with the good stuff". Anderson was impressed with the demo that he decided to use it as the final recording; he commented "Obviously, there were embellishments to it and we spent a lot of time on the whole production, but it was still the original one that we were using". However, some additional vocals by Minogue were recorded at DMC and Sarm West Studios in London, United Kingdom, and was mixed in the same locations by Niall Flynn and Paul West.

== Composition ==
Brothers in Rhythm were "well aware" of a crossover dynamic between pop and dance music at the time, noting that Minogue's vocals and "willingness to experiment with music" made them able to "push the envelope" further. Brothers in Rhythm composed the track, and is a pop song that incorporates elements of indie music, dance-pop, and Middle Eastern instrumentation such as strings and percussion. The opening part of the track, which lasts 50 seconds, were from the original demo of the track, and features an orchestral arrangement from musician Will Malone and a piano section by Anderson, which was performed using a Bösendorfer. The opening section also features a violin solo by Gavyn Wright, where Anderson and Wright commented that the inclusion was merely an "improvisation" to further help the record's sound. During the song's opening and spoken word bridge section, a gated didgeridoo is played by Anderson.

'Confide in Me'
A 27-second sample of "Confide in Me" containing instrumentation and the first verse. The song was noted by several critics for its instrumentation and Middle Eastern music influences.

According to Jason Lipshutz, writing for the American magazine Billboard, "'Confide in Me' continued Minogue on her path away from simplistic pop atop a swath of strings and Middle Eastern influences". Jude Rogers from The Guardian gave it a similar review, "before it pivots off the hook of an early-80s cult classic (the melody of Jane and Barton's 'It's a Fine Day', already revisited a few years earlier on Opus III's rave-era hit)". She also noted that the track samples from the 1974 Jimmy Smith jazz cover of Barry White's "I'm Gonna Love You Just a Little More Baby". Similarly, Nick Levine from Digital Spy labelled it "Middle Eastern pop", with elements of "string-swathed dance-pop". Larry Flick labelled the sound as "atmosphere", and believed it was influenced by downtempo music, while AllMusic's Tim Sendra described it as a "dramatic trip hop ballad".

Lyrically, the content is about Minogue's earnest attempts at seduction and manipulation of people to convince them confide in her. The message in the lyrics is that she manipulates situations between her and someone else by saying "I can keep a secret/and throw away the key." Within the song, there is ambiguity about who in the relationship holds power: at times it appears that she controls the situation, such as when she sings that "power remains hers." However, in the bridge she sings "stick or twist/the choice is yours," teasing her lover that they may hold the key to power. According to William Baker, whom had written a biography of Minogue detailing her career and life, the song "symbolizes internal power struggle that rages beneath [Kylie's] surface." He continues "she is both puppet and puppet master".

== Release ==
"Confide in Me" was released as the album's lead single on 29 August 1994 and was her first single to be distributed by Deconstruction; Imago and Mushroom also released it as a CD single, cassette tape and 12-inch and 7-inch vinyl. Two CD sets were released in the UK and Australia; the first CD featured the master mix, plus two remixes of the track, whilst the second CD featured the extended mix and two B-sides titled "Nothing Can Stop Us", originally by Saint Etienne, and "If You Don't Love Me", originally by Prefab Sprout. The European CD single featured the master mix and The Truth remix, whilst the US maxi CD included the radio edit, plus two remixes of the song and a remix of her song "Where Has the Love Gone?". Two vinyl sets were published in the UK and US, and the UK and Australia; the first featured the master mix and two remixes, whilst the latter spawned three remixes of "Confide in Me" and two remixes of "Where Has the Love Gone?". Released in the UK, a special 7-inch jukebox vinyl included two remixes, whilst two cassettes were distributed in the US and Australia respectively. In 2003, to promote Minogue's success with her album's Fever (2001) and Body Language in Asia, a promotional disc with five remixes of the single was issued in Japan and Israel, whilst a limited edition 12-inch vinyl was released in the UK to commemorate the 10th anniversary of the release.

== Critical response ==
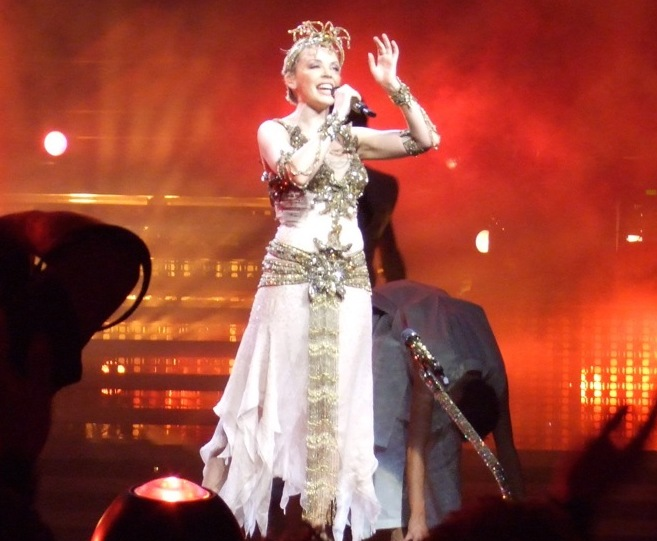
Minogue performing "Confide in Me" during the Showgirl: The Homecoming Tour

"Confide in Me" received universal acclaim from music critics. Sean Smith labelled the track a "classic" to Minogue's discography, as similar to how William Baker viewed it. Larry Flick from Billboard magazine complimented "the gorgeously atmospheric, downtempo album cut". Nick Levine from Digital Spy selected it as the standout, and commented "How can we plump for anything other than 'Confide in Me'? Fifteen years on, this sumptuous, string-swathed dance-pop epic still caresses the ears like a flirty hair stylist." Caroline Sullivan from The Guardian noted that it "has a classical violin overture that unfolds into a snake-charming Eastern melody. Kylie sounds delightfully woebegone." Mike Wass from Idolator wrote that "the Brothers in Rhythm-produced gem was the stepping stone that took her from the glorious pop of 'Better the Devil You Know' to collaborating with Nick Cave on 'Where the Wild Roses Grow'." He added that it was "a vehicle to showcase a then-hugely-underrated voice." Music writer James Masterton deemed it an "exotic, string-laden single". Alan Jones from Music Week gave it five out of five and named it Single of the Week, noting that "a widescreen string-driven shuffle which allows her to deliver a soft and polished vocal."

Johnny Cigarettes from NME wrote, "It trickles in sounding a dead spit for The Associates' "Breakfast". all elegantly weeping violins, then a loose breakbeat kicks in, the guitar from The Doors' "The End" tingles round the edges, and a soaring melancholic chorus finally ties your stomach in a knot." He also felt that it "sounds uncannily like Saint Etienne". Another NME editor, Paul Moody, named it "Kylie's gorgeous Maddie-esque sleaze-out". Quentin Harrison from PopMatters highlighted the track from the parent album, and said "Minogue's international perspective lent her canvas precision, not iciness as witnessed with 'Confide in Me'. The cut played like a lost spy film accompaniment, its grandiose strings and rumbling groove enthralled. 'Confide in Me' let Minogue become the vocalist cynics sneered she'd never be ...". Tim Jeffery from the Record Mirror Dance Update said, "Very Madonna-ish, in fact, even down to the giggly chuckle thrown in occasionally. Huge." Another Record Mirror editor, James Hamilton, deemed it a "Madonna-ishly moaned and muttered Brothers in Rhythm creation". Sylvia Patterson from Smash Hits gave it three out of five, writing, "Gone are the pop stonkers and instead Kylie does our heads in with a husky "epic" featuring Eastern charm and a distinct anxiety attack via Madonna's 'Justify My Love'." British author and critic Adrian Denning enjoyed the track and called it "truly timeless and absolutely wonderful." He declared the track "Arguably still her finest musical moment to this date," and found the production and lyrical delivery "classy". Billboard's Jason Lipshutz wrote of the track:

Deeply flirtatious and as knowingly dramatic as a James Bond theme song, "Confide in Me" continued Minogue on her path away from simplistic pop atop a swath of strings and Middle Eastern influences. The deadpanned bridge -- "Stick or twist, the choice is yours/Hit or miss, what's mine is yours" -- is delivered in a murmur that yearns for a Serious Artiste label.

Chris True at AllMusic described the song as "slicker, more stylish, and less hooky than anything she had previously recorded." He also highlighted the track as one of the album standouts. Similarly, Marc Andrews from DNA Magazine reviewed the remastered vinyl of the parent album and pointed it as the best track on the album. Mike Wass from Idolator said "the Australian diva switched labels and reemerged with a haunting Brothers in Rhythm-produced indie-pop anthem that still seethes and seduces 20 years later." Writing for the Herald Sun, Cameron Adams placed it at number two on his list of the singer's best songs, in honour of her 50th birthday, calling it: "THE one that changed everything – where Kylie became instantly cool [...] a lush, six-minute experimental epic with middle eastern vibes and modern dance beats, it automatically drew a line in the sand to reboot Kylie". Stephen Meade from The Network Forty described it as a "haunting dance-friendly sound". A negative review came from Hot Press editor Craig Fitzsimons; he criticised the "boring" production, saying "'Confide in Me' is exactly what you would expect; a boring, nothingy post-Stock Aiken Waterman piece of dance fluff enlivened only by Kylie's breathy exhortations to 'Stick or twist/The choice is yours/Hit or miss/What's mine is yours'." In the 2002 ITV show 'There's only 1 Kylie' dedicated to her, the tracks writers & producers Steve Anderson, Dave Seaman explained how Confide In Me with its patented Madonna whisper rap and sultry eastern vibes, was inspired by Madonna's Justify My Love & Erotica singles. They wanted to create that same sultry, eastern vibe made infamous by Madonna during that 90's part of her career.

== Chart performance ==
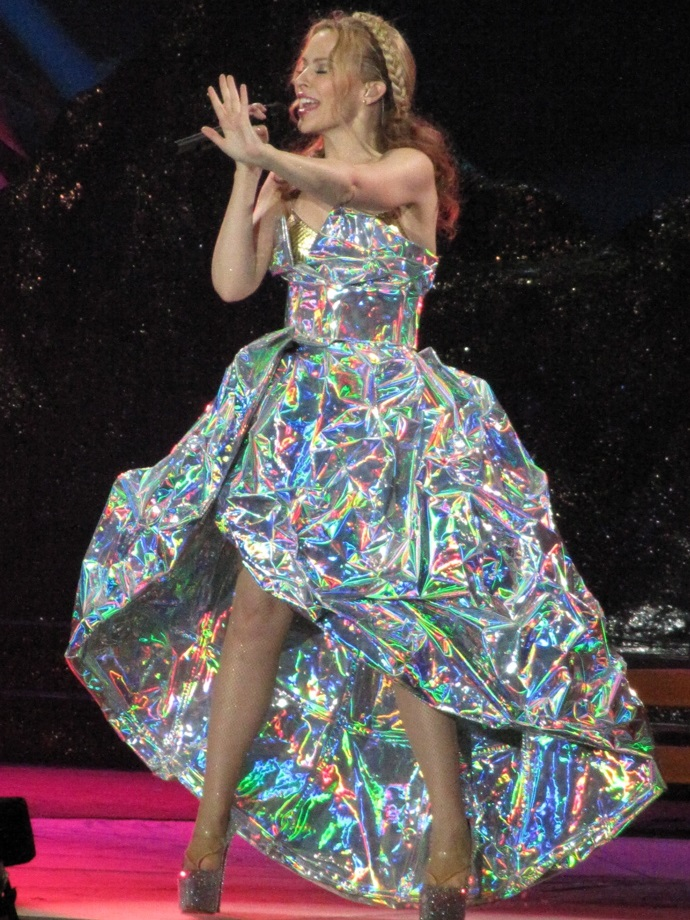
Minogue singing "Confide in Me" on her Aphrodite: Les Folies Tour, 2011

Commercially, the track experienced success in regions like Australia, United Kingdom, Ireland, France, Finland, and New Zealand. It debuted at number 31 on the Australian Singles Chart, but went straight to number one the following week, marking it one of the highest jumps for a single in Australian chart history. It became Minogue's first Australian number one single since her 1988 track "Got to Be Certain", her fourth overall, and remained at number one for four weeks. It stayed inside the top 10 for nine weeks, and eventually spent a total of 25 weeks in the top 100. It debuted at number two on the UK Singles Chart, having been stalled by Wet Wet Wet's Love is All Around (in its last of 15 weeks at number one), and lasted a total of 14 weeks inside the top 100 chart. It was certified Silver by the British Phonographic Industry (BPI) for shipments of 200,000 units, and sold 183,000 units by March 2014. The single peaked at number three on the Finnish Singles Chart, but failed to enter the top ten in Ireland, peaking at number 12 during September 1994.

In New Zealand, "Confide in Me" debuted and peaked at number 12, which was her first charting single since 1990's "Step Back in Time". It lasted four non-consecutive weeks inside the top 20, and stayed in the chart for nine weeks overall. The song was success on the French Singles Chart, peaking at number ten during its 13th week, and lasted a total charting span of 18 weeks. In Switzerland, it reached number 20 in its third week and lasted 8 weeks inside the top 100 chart. It stayed inside the German Singles Chart for 7 weeks, peaking at number 50, one of Minogue's lowest charting singles in that region. Elsewhere, it reached the top 40 in regions like the Netherlands' Dutch Top 40 chart, Belgium's region of Flanders, and in Sweden. The song was released by Imago Records in North America, and managed to chart on the US Billboard Dance Club Songs chart at number 39, staying in there for six weeks; this was Minogue's first and only charting single in the US during the 1990s period.

== Music video ==
The six Minogue stereotypes (one with army-esque material, a rainbow background, drugs, blood splatter, a Love Hearts sweet with the words "Call me" on it, and the final with an egg) was noted by critics as her first re-invention to her "Indie Kylie" image, which later progressed on her 1997 album Impossible Princess.

An accompanying music video was directed by Paul Boyd in Los Angeles, California during July 1994. According to William Baker, the video "presents Kylie as a kaleidoscope of female stereotypes that at first suggest her to be a plastic commodity. This notion is overturned by the lyrical content that reveals, contrarily, a multi-dimensional character who actually empowers". Minogue had shot the video just before working on the 1994 action-film Street Fighter, which she already had a tight schedule at the time due to promoting the single's release in the US, South East Asia, and in Australia. The video opens with a hand print, with the title underneath saying 'Touch the screen'; it hovers to the right, and six screens are divided into different "stereotypes" of Minogue; one with army-esque material, a rainbow background, drugs, blood splatter, a "love heart" candy with the words "Call me" on it, and the final with an egg.

During the entire video, several title screens appear that feature seductive phrases as similar to an advertisement commercial, including "Call me", "Call now", and a fake phone number for the audience to call; some title screens are written in different languages including French, German, Italian and Spanish. As the first verse starts, each individual Minogue clone sings the track in their respective areas. The video ends with all six figures walking off their sets, with the fake phone number at the bottom of the video.

Sean Smith noted that each Kylie was "slightly sinister and contained no cute skipping and jumping". Editors from Out.com highlighted the video amongst some of her best work. In an extended analysis, Bence Illés from Pop-Cultured said "The music videos accompanying the album were also Kylie's most colourful and provocative videos to date. 'Confide in Me' presented Minogue singing in front of six different colourful paintings symbolising murder, war and peace, sexuality, and drug use (as a nod to the 90s clubbing culture). The video also featured the singer as a femme fatale, as well as a cute girl, reminiscent to her career beginnings." Lewis Corner from Digital Spy listed it as one of Minogue's most surprising transformations, and also on a similar list by Simon Duke at Chronicle Live. The video placed third in the vote for Best Video at the 1994 Smash Hits Poll Winners Party.

== Live performances ==
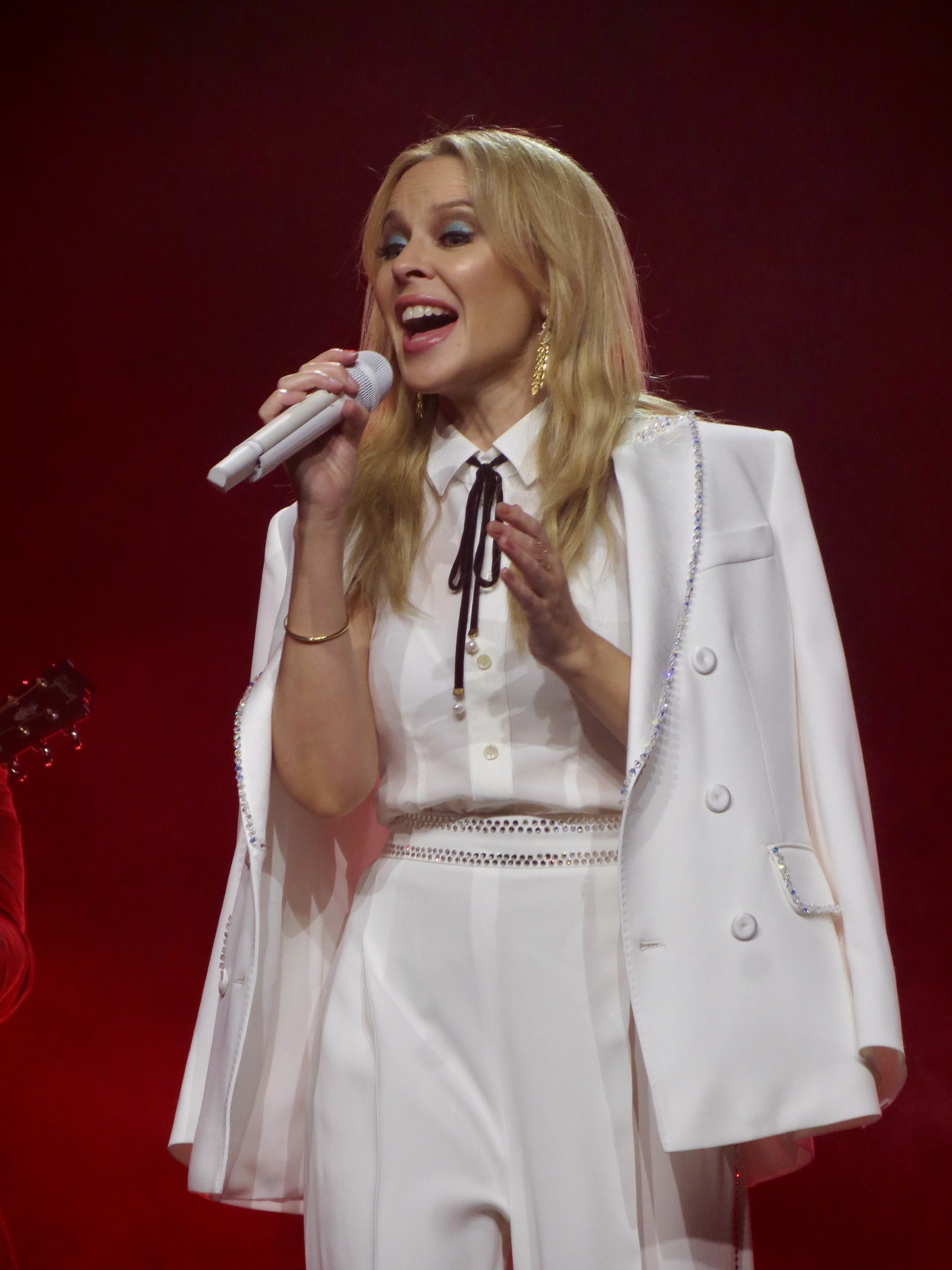
Minogue performing the song during the Golden Tour (2018–19)

As part of both single and album promotion, Minogue performed "Confide in Me" on some TV shows such as Hey Hey It's Saturday in Australia and Top of the Pops in the United Kingdom. "Confide in Me" has been performed on several concert tours by Minogue. It was first performed on her 1998 Intimate and Live tour, where it appeared in the fifth section. It was also performed in her fifth segment of the On a Night Like This Tour, following a performance of "Butterfly". The song was included in the Streetstyle section of her KylieFever2002 tour, where Minogue portrayed a police officer who, throughout this section, mixes with the kids on the street. The song was included on the 2005 Showgirl: The Greatest Hits Tour, during which a male dancer in eveningwear pursues the singer through gas-lit streets, until the pair engage in a ballroom dancing. Minogue was unable to complete the tour as she was diagnosed with early breast cancer and had to cancel the Australian leg of the tour. After undergoing treatment and recovery, she resumed the concert tour in the form of Showgirl: The Homecoming Tour in 2006, and "Confide in Me" was again added to the set list, with dancers manipulating her like a puppet during the performance.

Minogue included "Confide in Me" on the setlist of her 2009 For You, for Me tour, which was her first time touring in North America. As part of Aphrodite album promotion in 2010, Minogue performed a concert for BBC Radio 2 Acoustic Live Sessions, in which she sang an acoustic version of "Confide in Me", accompanied by a full orchestra band. The song was performed again on the 2011 Aphrodite: Les Folies Tour, where it opened the fifth section; Minogue wears a "Bacofoil ball gown" to perform the song. At the London stop of Hurts's Happiness Tour, on 4 November 2011, Minogue joined duo band to perform a duet of "Confide in Me". On the Kiss Me Once Tour in 2014, an a cappella portion of the song was performed on selected concerts, during the fan request moment. Minogue performed "Confide in Me" on A Kylie Christmas concert series in 2016, on act two, between "Come into My World" and "The One", performed as a duet with musician John Grant. The song was also included on the Golden Tour (2018–19); dressed in a white suit, Minogue performed an acoustic guitar-driven version of the song, which was described as "brooding" and "yearning" by some critics. Writing for News.com.au, Nick Bond felt the singer "somehow managed to ratchet up the song's drama more than previously possible". It was also included on the setlist of the Summer 2019 tour, being performed with Minogue stood with her dancers collapsed around her feet, "looking like Delacroix's Liberty Leading the People" according to NME's Dan Stubbs.

== Other uses and appearances ==
"Confide in Me" has been sampled and covered by several different musicians since its release. British rock band The Sisters of Mercy played a cover version of the song during their 1997 tour. Croatian rock band Analena covered the single, and their version appeared as a B-side to their single "Arhythmetics" in 2000. Similarly, a cover version by Australian artist Ben Lee appeared on his extended play The Dirty Little Secrets in 2002 and the b-side to his single "Something Borrowed, Something Blue". In 2006, another cover was added to Angtoria's album God Has a Plan for Us All, whilst British singer Nerina Pallot recorded her version for her single "Sophia". British duo Hurts performed a live version of the song, whilst Australian bands The Cat Empire and Tame Impala recorded their versions as stand-alone recordings.

British rapper Example sampled the track for his own song "No Sleep for the Wicked", whilst Australian artist Missy Higgins recorded it for her fourth studio album Oz (2014). The single was performed on the Australia Broadway show Priscilla, Queen of the Desert in 2007. "Confide in Me" has appeared on numerous greatest hits compilation albums conducted by Minogue, including the titular compilation album (2001), Ultimate Kylie (2004), The Best of Kylie Minogue (2012) and Step Back in Time: The Definitive Collection (2019). Some compilations, such as Ultimate Kylie and The Best of Kylie Minogue (2012) feature altered versions of the single, whilst the Phillip Damien Mix has appeared on her remix album Essential Mixes (2010). However, the compilation albums Confide in Me: The Irresistible Kylie (2007) and Confide in Me (2016 edition) are exactly the same album releases but distributed in two different years, meaning "Confide in Me" has been used in two same album releases. In 2018, a cover of the song was used throughout the marketing for the Foxtel miniseries, Picnic at Hanging Rock.

Version	Compilation album	Type	Ref.
"Confide in Me" (Master mix)	Hits+	Greatest Hits	
"Confide in Me" (Master mix)	Confide in Me	Greatest Hits	
"Confide in Me" (Master mix)	3 Originals	Box set	
"Confide in Me" (Master mix)	Artist Collection	Greatest Hits	
"Confide in Me" (Master mix)	Greatest Hits: 87–99	Greatest Hits	
"Confide in Me" (Master mix)	Confide in Me: The Irresistible Kylie	Greatest Hits	
"Confide in Me" (Master mix)	Kylie Minogue / Impossible Princess	Box set	
"Confide in Me" (Master mix)	K25 Time Capsule	Box set	
"Confide in Me" (Master mix)	Confide in Me (2016 edition)	Greatest hits	
"Confide in Me" (Radio mix)	Ultimate Kylie	Greatest hits	
"Confide in Me" (Radio mix)	The Best of Kylie Minogue	Greatest hits	
"Confide in Me" (Radio mix)	Step Back in Time: The Definitive Collection	Greatest hits	
"Confide in Me" (Phillip Damien Mix)	Essential Mixes	Remix album	

== Legacy ==
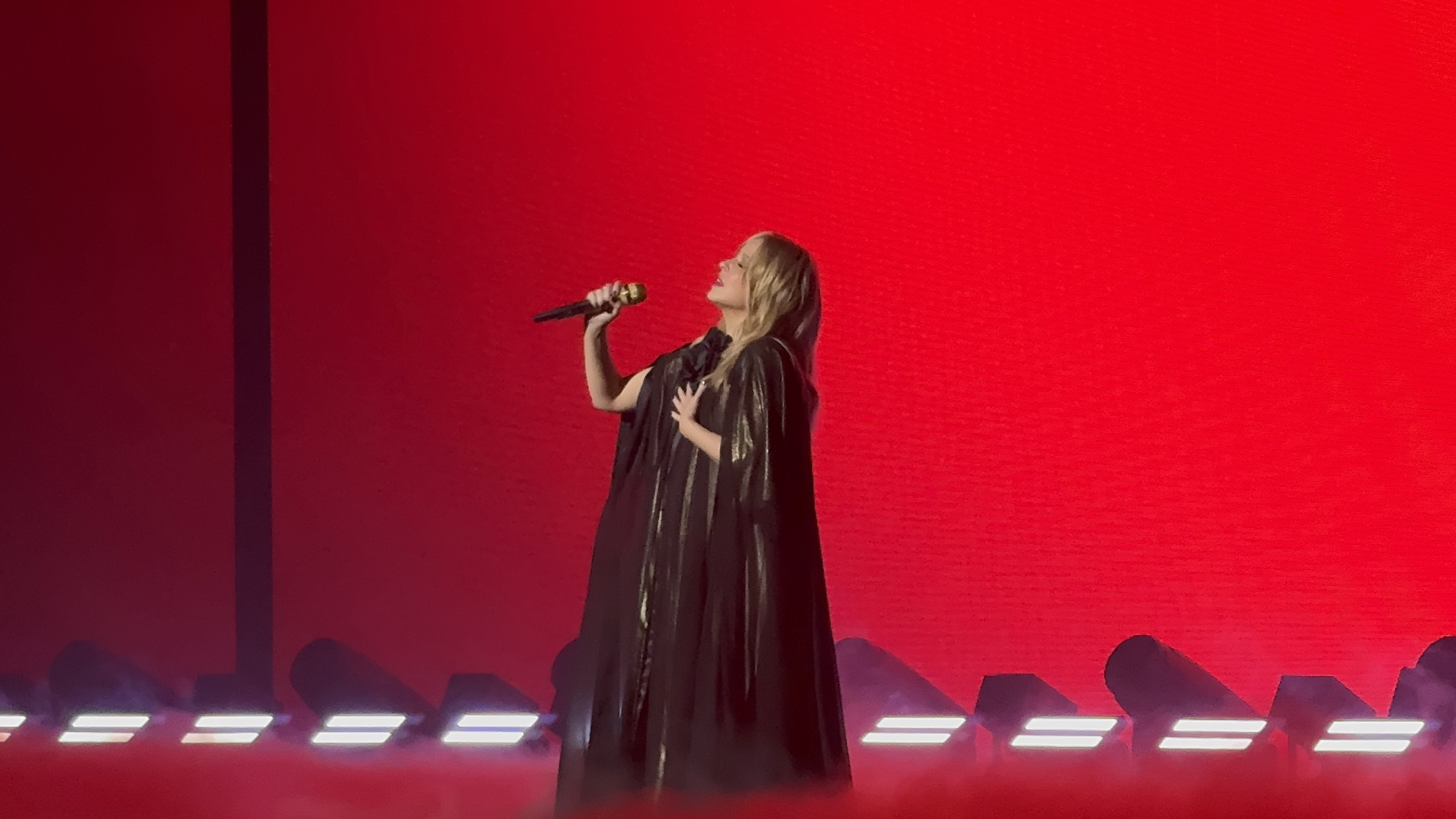
Minogue performing "Confide in Me" in an opera-style version during her 2025 Tension Tour

Since its release, "Confide in Me" has been noted by critics and publications as one of the most iconic and innovative singles from the 1990s era, and Minogue's singles history, and has been recognised by authors as an important period of Minogue's career and musical "re-inventions". According to Lee Barron, who wrote the book Social Theory in Popular Culture, the image of the music video was an example and opening of "Indie Kylie"; an image that later progressed through the work of her 1997 album Impossible Princess. Jude Rogers from The Guardian listed the track on her "10 of the Best Kylie Minogue Songs" in June 2016; Rogers complimented the production and said "The effect is utterly mesmerising, and Kylie is in total control from the off, telling you she "can keep a secret / And throw away the key". Later she turns the middle eight into a particularly pervy-sounding card game ("Stick or twist / The choice is yours"), and also plays with the idea of her fame ("Hit or miss / The choice is yours")." She also said the track was her "greatest, strangest hit". Brittany Porter from AXS.com listed the lyric "'I stand in the distance/I I view from afar/Should I offer some assistance/Should it matter who you are?'" as some of her best lyrical performances to date.

Nick Levine from Digital Spy labelled it one of her most standout singles to date. Louis Virtel, writing for the website NewNowNext.com, hosted by Logo TV, listed it as her third best track from 48 selected songs; he compared it to the work of Irish singer Sinéad O'Connor and said "Demanding intimacy is a Kylie strong suit, and her performance on this gently prodding, yet desperately longing track is so lovely and vulnerable ... Kylie's comfort in provocatively challenging a lover to be more honest is one of her greatest audio moments." Jason Lipshutz from Billboard listed it amongst nine other tracks on his "Kylie Minogue Primer: The Top 10 Past Hits You Need To Know" list. Zac Bayly from Oyster Magazine called it his favourite Minogue track. Stephen from Homorazzi.com listed it at number 7 on his "Top 10's: Top 10 Kylie Songs of All Time", stating "'Confide in Me' actually grew on me as time wore on. My first exposure to it was in her Greatest Hits album and it wasn't a track I paid much attention to, but in time it's grown into one of my favourites." On the American website AllMusic, it has been selected as a highlight numerous times from her albums: Confide in Me, Hits+, Greatest Hits 87–97, and Greatest Hits 87–99.

== Track listings ==
- Australian CD1 and cassette single, UK CD2
1. "Confide in Me" (Master Mix) – 5:51
2. "Nothing Can Stop Us" – 4:04
3. "If You Don't Love Me" – 2:08
- Australian CD2
1. "Confide in Me" (Master Mix) – 5:51
2. "Confide in Me" (Big Brothers Mix) – 10:27
3. "Confide in Me" (The Truth Mix) – 6:46
4. "Where Has the Love Gone?" (Fire Island Mix) – 7:48
5. "Where Has the Love Gone?" (Roach Motel Mix) – 8:02
- UK CD1
1. "Confide in Me" (Master Mix) – 5:51
2. "Confide in Me" (Big Brothers Mix) – 10:27
3. "Confide in Me" (The Truth Mix) – 6:46
- UK cassette single and European CD single
1. "Confide in Me" (radio mix) – 4:24
2. "Confide in Me" (The Truth Mix) – 6:46
- European CD maxi-single
1. "Confide in Me" (radio mix) – 4:24
2. "Confide in Me" (Master Mix) – 5:51
3. "Confide in Me" (Big Brothers Mix) – 10:27
4. "Confide in Me" (The Truth Mix) – 6:46
- US CD maxi-single
1. "Confide in Me" (radio mix) – 4:24
2. "Confide in Me" (Master Mix) – 5:51
3. "Confide in Me" (The Truth Mix) – 6:46
4. "Where Has the Love Gone?" (Fire Island 12-inch mix) – 7:48
- US cassette single
1. "Confide in Me" (radio mix) - 4:24
2. "Where Has the Love Gone?" (Fire Island 12-inch mix) – 7:48

Note: The Phillip Damien mixes were released exclusively in the US for promotional purposes only. The "Bass Change Mix" was later added to the commercial release of Put Yourself in My Place under the name "Phillip Damien Mix". Otherwise, they are identical.

== Credits and personnel ==
Credits adapted from the CD liner notes of Kylie Minogue:

Recording

- Partially recorded at Minogue's home in Chelsea, London.
- Recorded and mixed at DMC and Sarm West Studios in London, England, 1994.

Personnel

- Kylie Minogue – vocals, backing vocals
- Steve Anderson – instrumentation, production, composing, songwriting
- Dave Seaman – instrumentation, production, composing, songwriting
- Owain Barton – songwriting
- Brothers in Rhythm – composing, arranging
- Niall Flynn – mixing
- Paul West – mixing
- Paul Boyd – music video director

== Charts ==
=== Weekly charts ===
Chart (1994–1995)	Peak position
Australia (ARIA)	1
Belgium (Ultratop 50 Flanders)	20
Europe (Eurochart Hot 100)	9
Europe (European AC Radio)	17
Europe (European Dance Radio)	7
Europe (European Hit Radio)	14
Finland (Suomen virallinen lista)	3
France (SNEP)	10
Germany (GfK)	50
Greece (Pop + Rock)	1
Iceland (Íslenski Listinn Topp 40)	24
Ireland (IRMA)	12
Israel (Israeli Singles Chart)	1
Netherlands (Dutch Top 40)	38
Netherlands (Single Top 100)	38
New Zealand (Recorded Music NZ)	12
Scottish Singles Sales (Official Charts)	2
Sweden (Sverigetopplistan)	30
Switzerland (Schweizer Hitparade)	20
Turkey (Türkçe Top 20)	1
UK Singles (Official Charts)	2
UK Airplay (Hit Music)	11
UK Dance (Music Week)	4
UK Club Chart (Music Week)	5
US Dance Club Songs (Billboard)	39

=== Year-end charts ===
Chart (1994)	Position
Australia (ARIA)	22
Israel (Israeli Singles Chart)	3
UK Singles (OCC)	56

Chart (1995)	Position
France (SNEP)	75

== Certifications and sales ==
Region	Certification	Certified units/sales
Australia (ARIA)	Platinum	70,000^{^}
United Kingdom (BPI)	Silver	209,000
^{^} Shipments figures based on certification alone.

== See also ==
- List of number-one singles in Australia during the 1990s
