= Sunshine Studios =

International dance organisation

Coordinates: 53.4820°N 2.2325°W

Sunshine Studios is an international dance organisation. It was founded by hip-hop teacher Jerry Tse (a.k.a. JV) in Manchester, England, in 2006 with his flat mate Tim Barlow.

Sunshine Studios gives artists of various performing and visual arts studio space and the chance to run public classes. It uses a similar business model to other dance studios such as Pineapple Studios in London and Steps on Broadway in New York City. The studios offer a variety of workshops and nearly 100 classes per week. These include urban art, live music, hip-hop, ballet, tap, jazz, salsa, pilates, pole-dancing, flamenco, cheerleading, contemporary dance, breakdancing and other forms of performing arts.

== History ==
The idea for a dance studio in Manchester was Jerry Tse's original idea, with his flatmate Tim Barlow who had wanted Music and Art involvement. The unlikely pair developed a Dance concept into a six floor, 40,000 square foot Dance, Arts and Music Studio. Estd 2002.

As the pair were finalising their first lease and purpose built facility there was a fire at its Dale St premises in June 2007> Forced to rethink and rehome their second building was the target of an arson attack in August 2007.

Britain's Got Talent winner George Sampson was a member of the studio.

The organisation now also runs studios in Bolton, Blackburn, Stavanger, Beijing, Cairo and Los Angeles.
