= Jonas Quant =

- Also known as: Quant
- Born: Jonas Quant; December 20, 1973 (age 52); Gothenburg, Sweden
- Genres: Pop; hip hop; electronic
- Occupations: Record producer; songwriter; remixer
- Years active: 1995–present
- Labels: Dot; Ecco.Chamber

Jonas Quant, also known simply as Quant, is a Swedish record producer, songwriter and remixer from Gothenburg.

As a solo artist, Quant released music in the late 1990s and early 2000s on the Swedish record label Dot.

In 2010, Quant co-produced English duo Hurts' debut album, Happiness, which became the fastest-selling debut album of that year by a band in the United Kingdom. Quant has also collaborated with artists such as No Doubt, Kylie Minogue, Leona Lewis, Agnes Carlsson, Petra Marklund and Dolores Haze.

In 2015, Quant helped British pop singer Foxes write her second studio album, All I Need.

On March 16, 2021, it was announced that Jonas is the artist behind the first Swedish NFT, which was auctioned to the highest bidder on March 26, 2021.

== Discography ==
=== Studio albums ===
- Quantastical Quantasm (2000)
- Getting Out (2004)
- WNDBLWS (2020)

=== Extended plays ===
- Breaking & Entering (1997)
- Quant (1997)
- Funkster EP (2002)

=== Singles ===
- "Tik Tok" (2000)
- "Miracle Man" (2003)
- "Tryin'" (2004)

== Selected songwriting discography ==
- Hurts
- No Doubt
- Kylie Minogue
- Agnes Carlsson
- Leona Lewis
- Dolores Haze
- Tosca
- Similou
- Coldcut
- Laura Welch (co-produced with Emile Hayne)
- Kaskade (remix)
