= Dave Gibson (Scottish singer-songwriter) =

- Born: David James Harvey Gibson; Scotland, UK
- Genres: Pop; dance; electronic; country; R&B; gospel
- Occupations: Singer; songwriter
- Instruments: Vocals; guitar
- Years active: 2009–present
- Labels: BMG
- Spouse: Lily Nicksay (m. 2015)
- Website: www.bmg.com/de/artist/dave-gibson

David James Harvey Gibson is a Scottish singer and writer of Grammy, CMA, and CMT-nominated, and BMI award-winning songs. He has lived in Los Angeles, California, since 2015.

== Career ==
Since then, he has collaborated with many artists and producers, including Bruno Mars, Philip Lawrence, MXM, Stargate, Rodney "Darkchild" Jerkins, BURNS, Gitty, James Arthur, Lukas Graham, Louis Tomlinson, G-Eazy, Toni Braxton, Jessie J, Mary J. Blige, Keith Urban, Tim McGraw and Faith Hill.

== Discography ==
Year	Artist	Song	Album	Label	Role	Achievements
2025	Saint Clara	Here for Me	Songs I Cry 2		Writer	
2024	Bruno Martini	You Will Find Me			Writer	
2024	Pixie Lott	Anybody Else			Vocal Producer, Writer	
2024	Christian Gates	Shreds	No Strings Attached		Writer	
2024	Jamie Miller	Better By Myself	Long Way Home		Writer	
2024	Lawrence Rothman	LAX (feat Amanda Shires)	The Plow That Broke The Plains		Writer	
2024	Lawrence Rothman	Twin Flames	The Plow That Broke The Plains		Writer	
2024	Pixie Lott	Show You Love	Encino	BMG	Vocal Producer, Writer	
2024	Pixie Lott	Somebody's Daughter	Encino	BMG	Vocal Producer, Writer	
2024	Pixie Lott	Anybody Else	Encino	BMG	Vocal Producer, Writer	
2024	Pixie Lott	Blockbuster Video	Encino	BMG	Vocal Producer, Writer	
2024	Pixie Lott	Further From Love	Encino	BMG	Vocal Producer, Writer	
2024	Pixie Lott	Coco	Encino	BMG	Vocal Producer, Writer	
2024	Pixie Lott	Happy	Encino	BMG	Vocal Producer, Writer	
2024	Pixie Lott	Vintage	Encino	BMG	Vocal Producer, Writer	
2024	Pixie Lott	Stars	Encino	BMG	Vocal Producer, Writer	
2024	Pixie Lott	Say So	Encino	BMG	Vocal Producer, Writer	
2024	Pixie Lott	All We Have Is Now	Encino	BMG	Vocal Producer, Writer	
2024	Pixie Lott	Comes Back Around	Encino	BMG	Vocal Producer, Writer	
2024	Gina Alice	Lonely In Paris	Dreamcatcher EP			
2024	Gina Alice	Game Show	Dreamcatcher EP			
2024	Violet Days	Mulholland Drive	Shimmer and Blue			
2024	Conrad Sewell	Different Kind Of Love				
2024	Koe Wetzel	Bar Song				
2024	Lasse Skriver	Hold On				
2024	Louis Tomlinson		Louis Tomlinson Live			
2024	DJ Will Clarke, Burns	Give Me				
2023	Thirty Seconds To Mars	Midnight Prayer	It's The End Of The World			
2023	Kaaze, Steve Aoki	Won't Forget This Time				
2023	Saint Clara	Progress	Progress			
2023	Bebe Rexha	Call On Me (David Guetta Remix)				
2023	Hogland	Afterlife				
2023	Bebe Rexha	Call On Me				
2023	Lukas Graham	Share That Love (Feat G Eazy)	4 (The Pink Album)			
2023	Lukas Graham	Say Forever	4 (The Pink Album)			
2022	Louis Tomlinson	Out Of My System (Acoustic)			Vocal Producer, Writer, Guitar	
2022	Louis Tomlinson	Out Of My System	Faith in the Future	BMG Records	Writer	UK #1 Album UK Independent #1 Album US Billboard 200 #5 Album Australia #2 Album Belgium #1 Album Dutch #2 Album German #2 Album Scottish #2 Album Spanish #1 Album
2022	Louis Tomlinson	Chicago	Faith in the Future	BMG Records	Writer	UK #1 Album UK Independent #1 Album US Billboard 200 #5 Album Australia #2 Album Belgium #1 Album Dutch #2 Album German #2 Album Scottish #2 Album Spanish #1 Album
2022	Louis Tomlinson	Paradise (Target Deluxe Exclusive)	Faith in the Future	BMG Records	Writer	UK #1 Album UK Independent #1 Album US Billboard 200 #5 Album Australia #2 Album Belgium #1 Album Dutch #2 Album German #2 Album Scottish #2 Album Spanish #1 Album
2022	Louis Tomlinson	Face The Music	Faith in the Future	BMG Records	Writer	UK #1 Album UK Independent #1 Album US Billboard 200 #5 Album Australia #2 Album Belgium #1 Album Dutch #2 Album German #2 Album Scottish #2 Album Spanish #1 Album
2022	Louis Tomlinson	Saved By A Stranger (Demo)	Bigger Than Me (B-Side)	BMG Records	Vocal Producer, Writer, Vocals, Guitar	
2022	Anthony Ramos	We Made It	Lyle Lyle Crocodile Soundtrack	Columbia Pictures, Island Records	Writer, producer, vocals	
2022	Nina Nesbitt	Heirlooms	Alskar Nights	Cooking Vinyl	Writer	
2022	Nghtmre + SLANDER	Monster	Thrive	Self Released	Writer, vocals	
2022	Nina Nesbitt	Heirlooms	Alskar	Cooking Vinyl	Writer	Scottish Charts #3 Album UK Charts #34 Album UK Independent Charts #2 Album
2022	James Arthur	Car's Outside Car's Outside (Acoustic) Car's Outside (Sped Up Version) Car's Outside (Slowed Down Version)	Car's Outside EP	Columbia Records	Writer	
2022	Anthony Gargiula	Storm	N/A		Writer	
2022	Calum Scott	The Way You Loved Me	Bridges	Capitol Records	Writer	
2022	Weezer	A Little Bit of Love	SZNZ: Spring	Atlantic Records Crush	Writer	Canada Rock (Billboard) #2 Song US Hot Rock & Alternative Songs (Billboard) #28 Song US Alternative Airplay #1 Song US Rock Airplay (Billboard) #4 Song
2022	Nell Bryden	Somebody For Me	Arms Around The Flame	157 Records NYC	Writer	
2021	Amanda Shires	Wish For You	For Christmas	Silver Knife Records	Writer	
2021	D.O.	Dad	Empathy (EP)	SM Entertainment	Writer	South Korea (KMCA) Platinum Album (250k +) Harpers Bazaar #1 K-Pop Album 2021 South Korean Charts (Gaon) #1 Album Japanese Charts (Oricon) #4 Album
2021	Christopher	Ghost	My Blood	Parlophone	Writer	#3 Highest Earning Song Denmark 2021
2020	Lukas Graham ft. G-Eazy	Share That Love	N/A	Warner Records	Writer, vocal producer, Background Vocals	
2020	Evie Irie	Vulnerable	The Pessimist EP	Republic Records	Writer	
2020	Spencer Sutherland	Too Many Friends	Indigo	BMG	Writer	
2020	Hurts	Voices	Faith	Lento Records	Writer	Austrian Charts #8 Album German Charts #9 Album Scottish Charts #5 Album UK Charts (OCC) #21 Album
2020	Nico Santos	Unforgettable (feat. Alvaro Soler)	Nico Santos	Virgin Records	Writer	German Charts #3 Album Austrian Charts #5 Album Swiss Charts #2 Album
2020	Maximillian	Crossroads	Still Alive EP	Universal Music A/S	Writer	
2020	Louis Tomlinson	Walls	Walls	Arista/Syco	Writer	Italy (FIMI) Gold Album Mexico (AMPROFON) Gold Album Spain (PROMUSICAE) Gold Album UK (BPI) Silver Album US Billboard #9 Top 200 Album UK Charts (OCC) #4 Album Australian Charts (ARIA) #6 Album Scottish Charts (OCC) #1 Album Belgian Charts (Ultratop Flanders) #10 Album
2020	Christopher	Ghost	N/A	Parlophone (Denmark)	Writer	#1 Song Danish Radio 2020
2019	Holland	Loved You Better	N/A	Warner Music Korea	Writer	
2019	Liam Payne	Before It Ends	LP1 (deluxe)	Capitol Records	Writer	
2019	James Arthur	Car's Outside	You	Columbia Records	Writer	UK (BPI) Silver Album UK Charts (OCC) #2 Album Scottish Charts (OCC) #4 Album Irish Charts (IRMA) #7 Album Swiss Charts (Schweizer Hitparade) #5 Album
2019	Luke Evans	Changing	At Last	BMG (UK)	Writer	UK Charts (OCC) #11 Album
2019	Evie Irie	Vulnerable	5 Weeks In LA	Republic Records	Writer	
2019	Mika	Ready to Call This Love (feat. Jack Savoretti)	My Name is Michael Holbrook	Republic Records	Writer	Belgian Charts (Ultratop Wallonia) #3 Album France Charts (SNEP) #6 Album Italian Charts (FIMI) #10 Album Swiss Charts (Schweizer Hitparade) #10 Album
2019	Conrad Sewell	Changing	Life	300 Entertainment	Writer	Australian Charts (ARIA) #1 Album
2019	Matrix & Futurebound	Hindsight	Mystery Machine	Metro/Viper Recordings	Writer, Vocalist	UK Official Dance Charts #5 Album
2019	Boris Way	Wasted Love	Wasted Love (Remixes)	Parlophone (France)	Writer	
2018	Nico Santos	Unforgettable	Streets of Gold	Virgin Records	Writer	
2018	Luca Schreiner	Over You	N/A	Ultra Music	Writer	
2018	Alex Aiono	No Drama	N/A	UMGRI/Interscope	Writer	
2018	Kodaline	Shed A Tear	Politics of Living	B-Unique/RCA	Writer	Irish Charts #1 Album UK Official Charts #15 Album
2018	Toni Braxton	Coping	Sex & Cigarettes	Def Jam Recordings	Writer	2018 Grammy Nomination Best R&B Album UK Official Charts #1 R&B Album
2017	Tim McGraw and Faith Hill	Speak to a Girl	The Rest of Our Life	Arista Nashville	Writer	US Billboard #1 Top Country Album US Billboard #2 Top 200 Album 2017 CMA Nomination Best Musical Event of the Year 2018 CMT Nomination Best Duo Video of the Year 2018 BMI Award for Outstanding Radio Play
2017	Robin Schulz (with Hugel)	I Believe I'm Fine	Uncovered	Tonspiel, Warner Music Group	Writer, Vocalist	
2017	Robin Schulz	Higher Ground	Uncovered	Tonspiel, Warner Music Group	Writer, Vocalist	
2017	Toni Braxton	Coping (Eden Prince Remix) Coping (Paris & Simo Remix) Coping (Stadiumx Remix) Coping (Disco Killerz Remix) Coping (Tom Swoon Remix)	Coping (Remixes) EP	Def Jam Recordings	Writer	US Billboard #1 Dance Single
2017	Matrix & Futurebound	Light Us Up (feat. Calum Scott)	N/A	Parlophone UK	Writer	
2017	Julian Martel	Get Over It	N/A	Anubis Vidar Entertainment Group	Writer	
2017	Jackson Yee	Unpredictable	N/A	Beijing Time Fengjun Culture & Entertainment Co.	Writer	
2017	Nell Bryden	Dared the World and Won	Bloom	157 Records	Writer	
2017	RKCB	31/10	RCKB-Sides	Allpoints	Writer, Vocalist	
2017	RKCB	Burden	RCKB-Sides	Allpoints	Writer, Vocalist	
2016	James Arthur	Sermon (feat. Shotty Horroh)	Back From The Edge	Columbia Records	Writer	UK Albums Chart #1 album UK (BPI) Platinum Album US Billboard Top 40 Album
2016	Conrad Sewell	Remind Me	All I Know EP	300 Entertainment	Writer	Australian Charts (ARIA) #9 Album Australian Charts (ARIA) Gold single
2016	Tim Bowman Jr.	Everybody Needs Love (feat. BrvndoP)	Listen	Lifestyle Music Group, Capitol Records	Writer	2017 Grammy Nomination Best Gospel Album US Billboard #1 Top Gospel Album
2016	Tim Bowman Jr.	Back to You	Listen	Lifestyle Music Group, Capitol Records	Writer	2017 Grammy Nomination Best Gospel Album US Billboard #1 Top Gospel Album
2016	RKCB	Elevated	N/A	N/A	Writer	
2016	Mount	Bend Before We Break	N/A	Ultra Music	Writer, Vocalist	
2015	Marco Mengoni	Dove Siamo	Le Cose Che Non Ho	Sony Music Italy	Writer	Italian Charts (FIMI) 4× Platinum Album
2015	Andrea Faustini	Back to the Sea	Kelly	Syco Music, RCA, Sony Music	Writer	
2015	DC Breaks	Breathe (feat. Dave Gibson)	N/A	RAM Records	Writer, Vocalist	
2015	DC Breaks	Faithless	N/A	RAM Records	Writer	
2015	DC Breaks	If This Is Love	N/A	RAM Records	Writer	
2014	Nell Bryden	Wayfarer	Wayfarer	Absolute Marketing & Distribution/157 Records	Writer	
2014	Nell Bryden	Camouflages	Wayfarer	Absolute Marketing & Distribution/157 Records	Writer	
2014	Nell Bryden	Waves	Wayfarer	Absolute Marketing & Distribution/157 Records	Writer	
2014	Nell Bryden	Westbourne Park	Wayfarer	Absolute Marketing & Distribution/157 Records	Writer	
2014	Nell Bryden	Crescent City Gold	Wayfarer	Absolute Marketing & Distribution/157 Records	Writer	
2014	Nell Bryden	Wolves	Wayfarer	Absolute Marketing & Distribution/157 Records	Writer	
2013	Marco Mengoni	Pronto A Correre	#prontoacorrere	Sony Music Italy	Writer	Italian Charts (FIMI) 2× Platinum Album Italian Charts (FIMI) Platinum Single
