= List of best-selling singles and albums of 2015 in Ireland =

This is a list of the best selling singles, albums and as according to IRMA. Further listings can be found here.

== Top-selling singles ==
1. "Uptown Funk!" – Mark Ronson featuring Bruno Mars
2. "Cheerleader" – OMI
3. "Lean On" – Major Lazer featuring DJ Snake & MØ
4. "Thinking Out Loud" – Ed Sheeran
5. "See You Again" – Wiz Khalifa featuring Charlie Puth
6. "Love Me like You Do" – Ellie Goulding
7. "Hello" – Adele
8. "Shut Up and Dance" – Walk the Moon
9. "What Do You Mean?" – Justin Bieber
10. "Firestone" – Kygo featuring Conrad Sewell

== Top-selling albums* ==
1. 25 – Adele
2. X – Ed Sheeran
3. Hozier – Hozier
4. Purpose – Justin Bieber
5. In the Lonely Hour – Sam Smith
6. 1989 – Taylor Swift
7. Coming Up for Air – Kodaline
8. Beautiful Life At Christmas – Nathan Carter
9. Made in the A.M. – One Direction
10. If I Can Dream – Elvis Presley

Notes:

- *Compilation albums that are composed of Various Artists are not included.
