= The Masked Singer (Australian TV series) season 5 =

The Masked Singer
- Season 5
- Presented by: Osher Günsberg
- Judges: Mel B; Dave Hughes; Abbie Chatfield; Chrissie Swan
- No. of contestants: 13
- Winner: Dami Im as "Snow Fox"
- Runner-up: Darren Hayes as "Grim Reaper"
- No. of episodes: 12

Release
- Original network: Network 10
- Original release: 11 September – 7 November 2023

Additional information
- Filming dates: 13 June – 3 July 2023

Season chronology
- ← Previous; Season 4

The fifth and final season of The Masked Singer Australia was announced in February 2023 and premiered on Network 10 on 11 September 2023.

The fifth season series was filmed with a live audience between 13 June and 3 July 2023.

== Production ==
The costumes were designed and created by Australian Academy Award and BAFTA Award-Winning costume designer Tim Chappel, who is best known for his work on The Adventures of Priscilla, Queen of the Desert with Lizzy Gardiner.

== Panellists and host ==
Comedian Dave Hughes, British singer-songwriter Mel B, TV personality Abbie Chatfield and radio personality Chrissie Swan returned to the judging panel from the previous season. Hughes is the only remaining original panellist. Osher Günsberg returned as host.

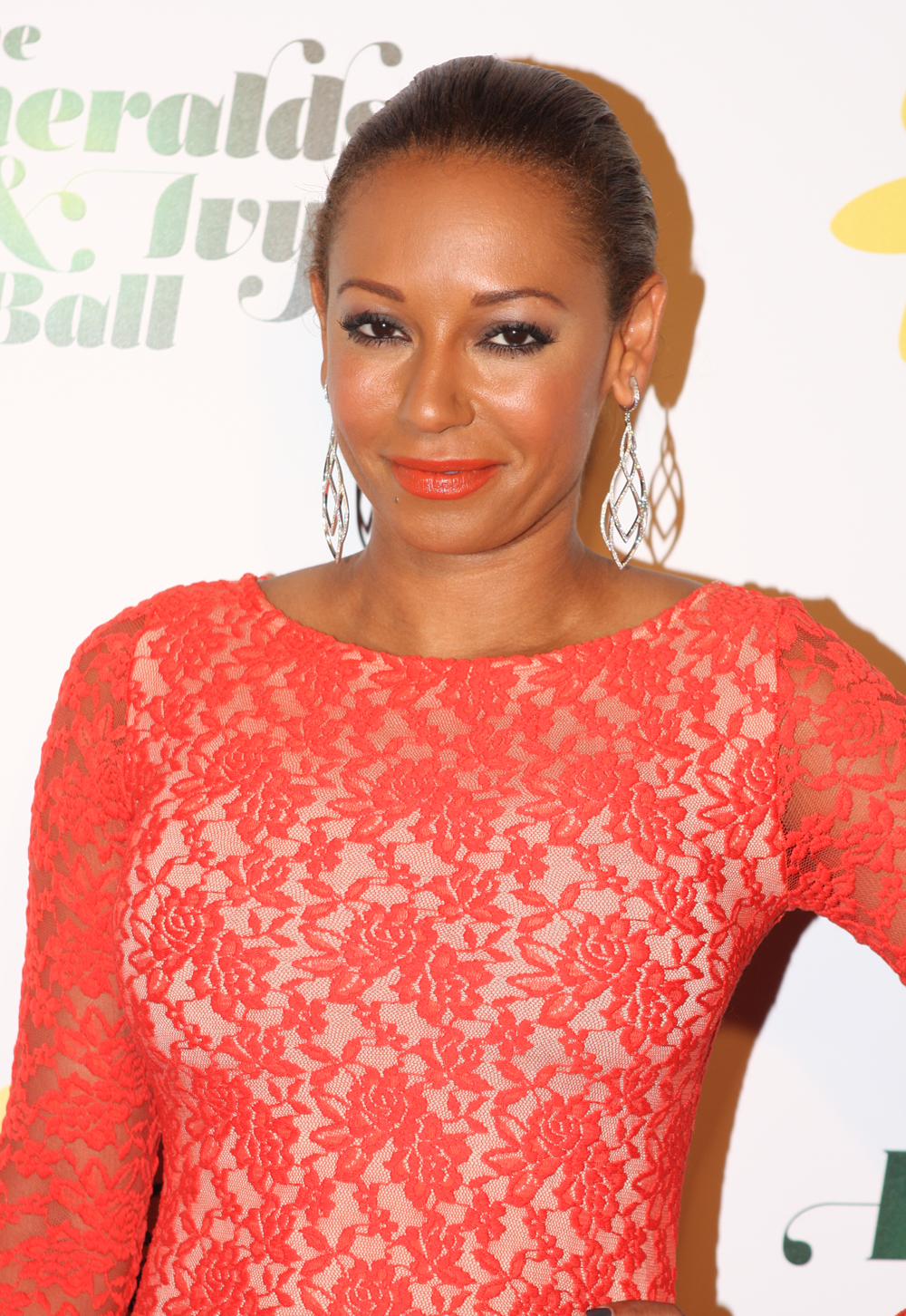
Mel B

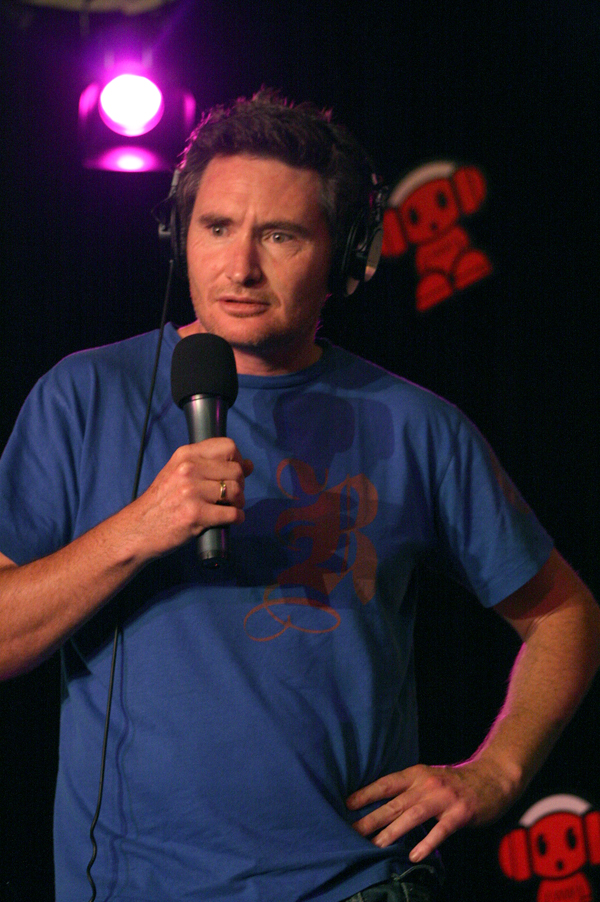
Dave Hughes

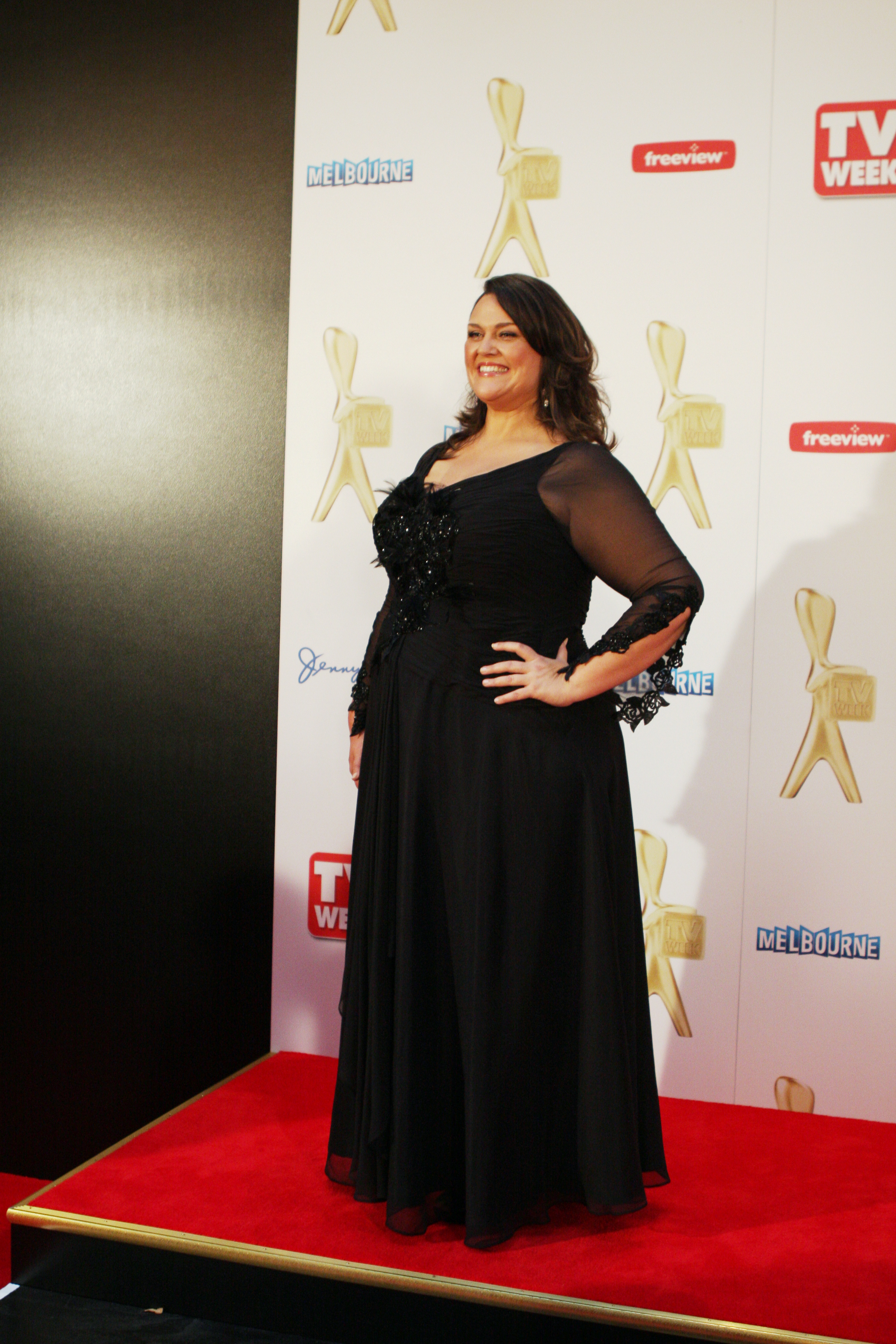
Chrissie Swan

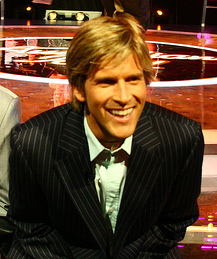
Osher Günsberg

== Contestants ==
Before the season began, Network Ten revealed that the cast included a Hollywood heartthrob, a Grammy Award-winning international singer, a singer with almost 25 million albums sold, a singer with more than 1 million records sold, a performer with more than a billion streams, a reality TV star and a sportstar. The cast were also revealed to have amassed a combined 20 ARIA Awards and hold multiple platinum and gold-certified records.

The Wild Card twist from the previous season returned, with three "Wild Card" contestants to enter and perform later in the competition.

Stage name	Identity	Occupation(s)	Episodes										
Stage name	Identity	Occupation(s)	1	2	3	4	5	6	7	8	9	10	12
Snow Fox	Dami Im	Singer		SAFE		SAFE		SAFE	SAFE	SAFE	SAFE	SAFE	WINNER
Grim Reaper	Darren Hayes	Singer	SAFE		SAFE		SAFE		SAFE	SAFE	SAFE	SAFE	RUNNER-UP
Bouncer	Conrad Sewell	Singer		SAFE		SAFE		SAFE	SAFE	SAFE	SAFE	SAFE	THIRD
Cowgirl	Courtney Act	Drag queen/singer	SAFE		SAFE		SAFE		SAFE	SAFE	SAFE	OUT	
The Captain (WC)	Brendan Fevola	Australian rules footballer									OUT		
Orca (WC)	Amy Sheppard	Singer					SAFE		SAFE	OUT			
Burger Gal (WC)	La Toya Jackson	Singer						SAFE	OUT				
Tiny	Pete Murray	Singer/musician		SAFE		RISK		OUT					
Space Fairy	Charlotte Crosby	Reality TV personality	SAFE		RISK		OUT						
Bluebottle	Shaynna Blaze	Interior designer/TV personality		SAFE		OUT							
Bad Avocado	Summer Warne	Internet personality	SAFE		OUT								
Fawn	Sandra Sully	News presenter/journalist		OUT									
Crash Test Dummy	Brian Austin Green	Actor	OUT										

The masked singer was in the bottom two but won their duel, and was not eliminated.
The masked singer was safe from elimination.
The masked singer was eliminated from the competition and unmasked upon their elimination.
The masked singer did not perform.

(WC) This masked singer is a wild card contestant.

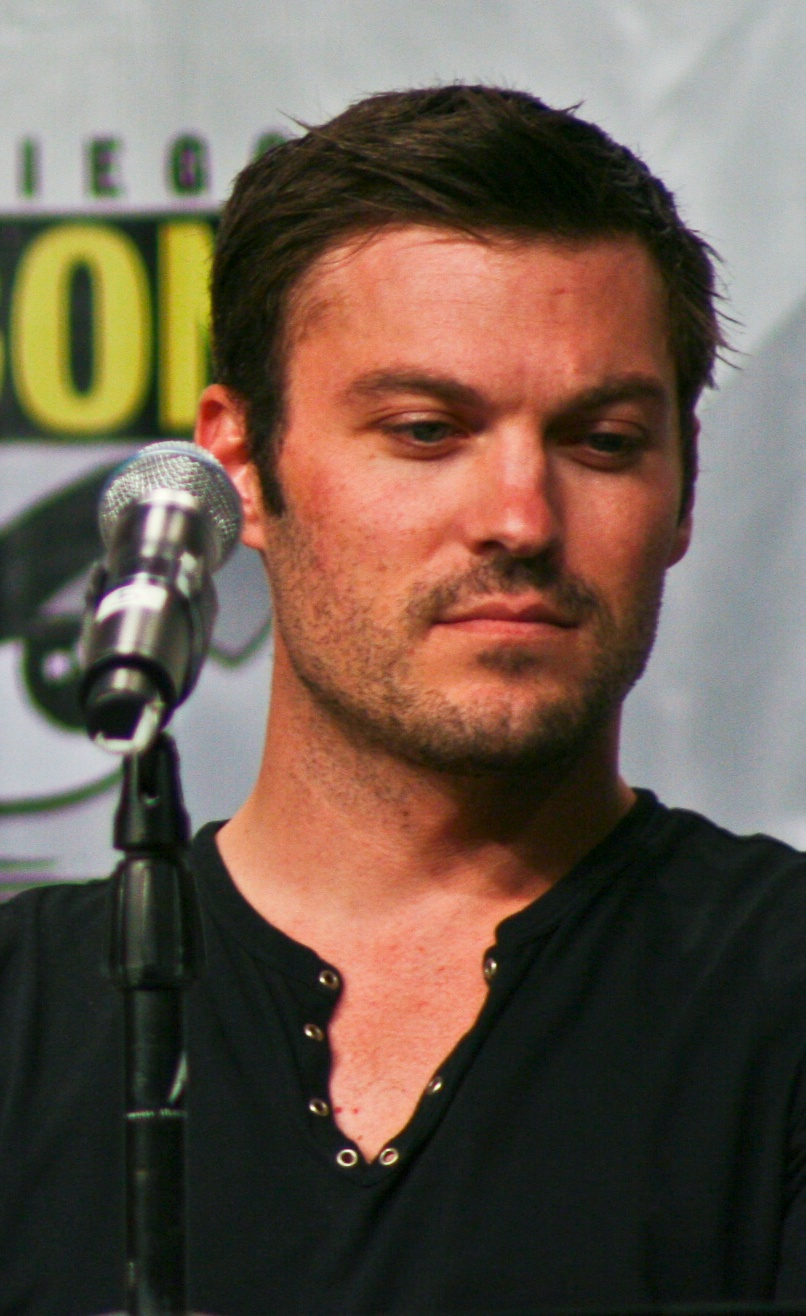
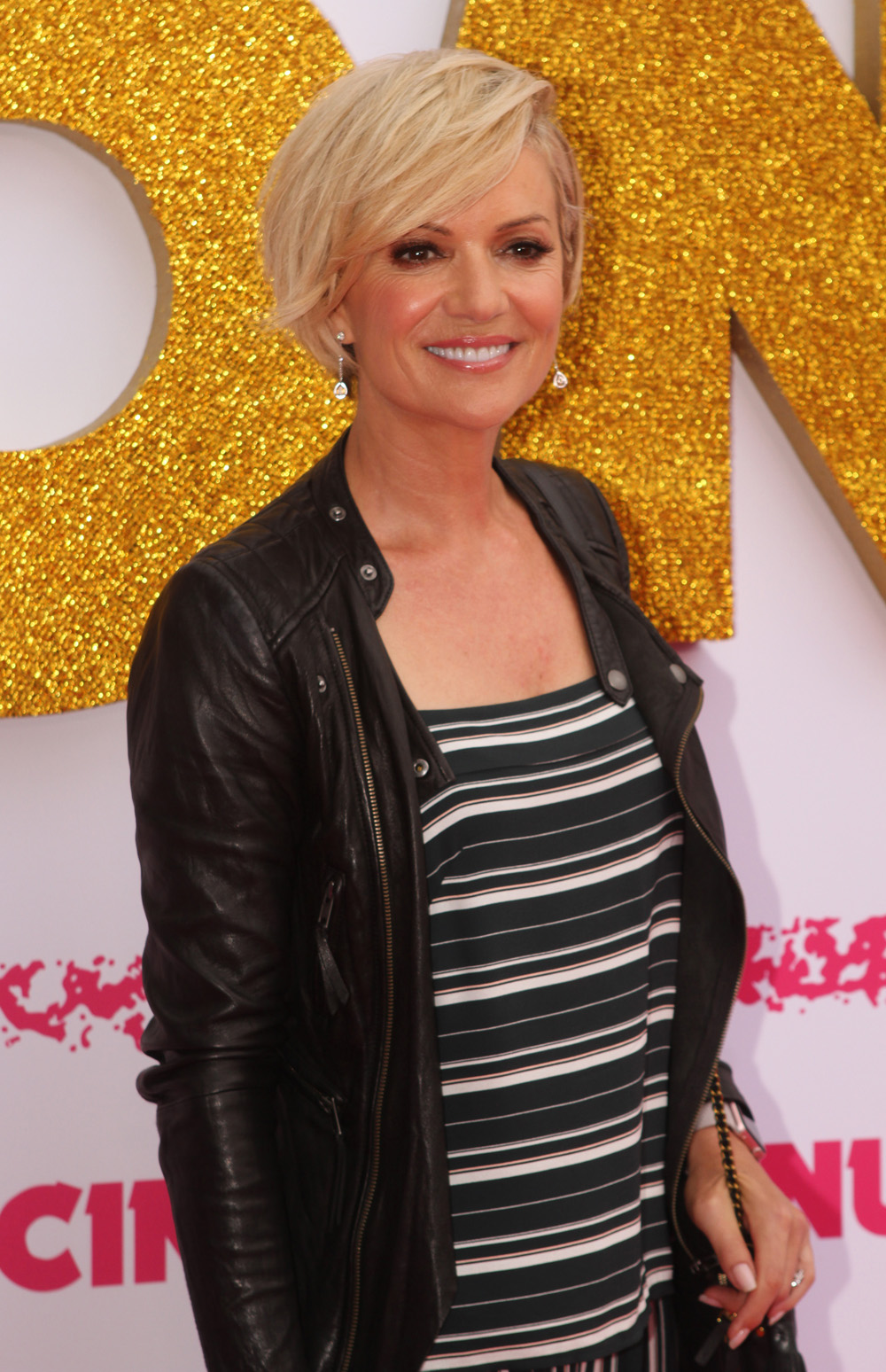
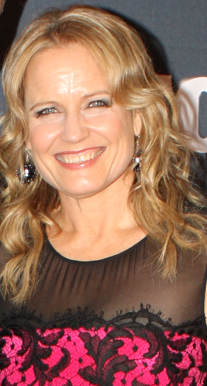
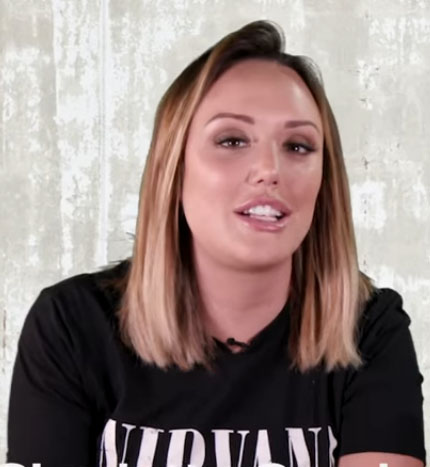
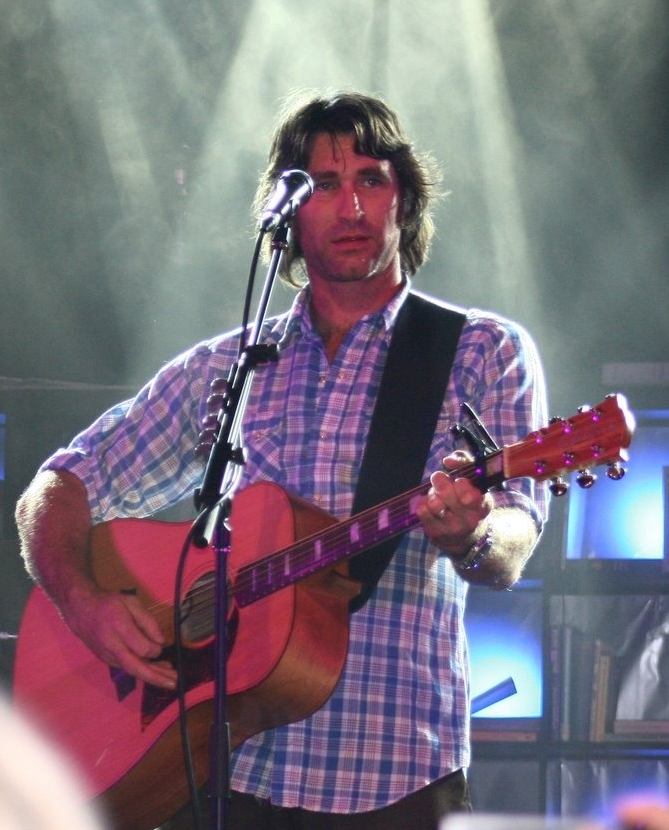
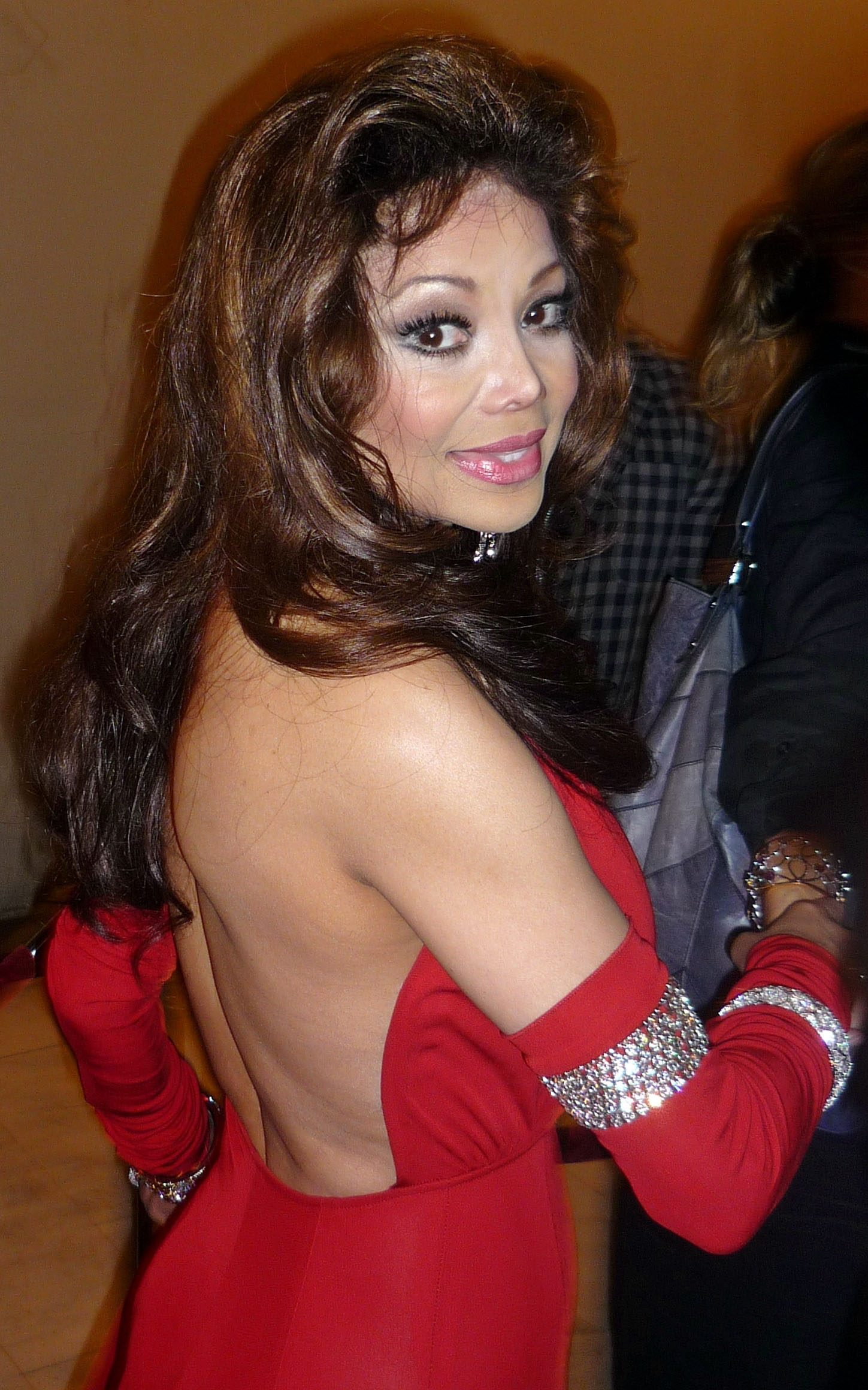
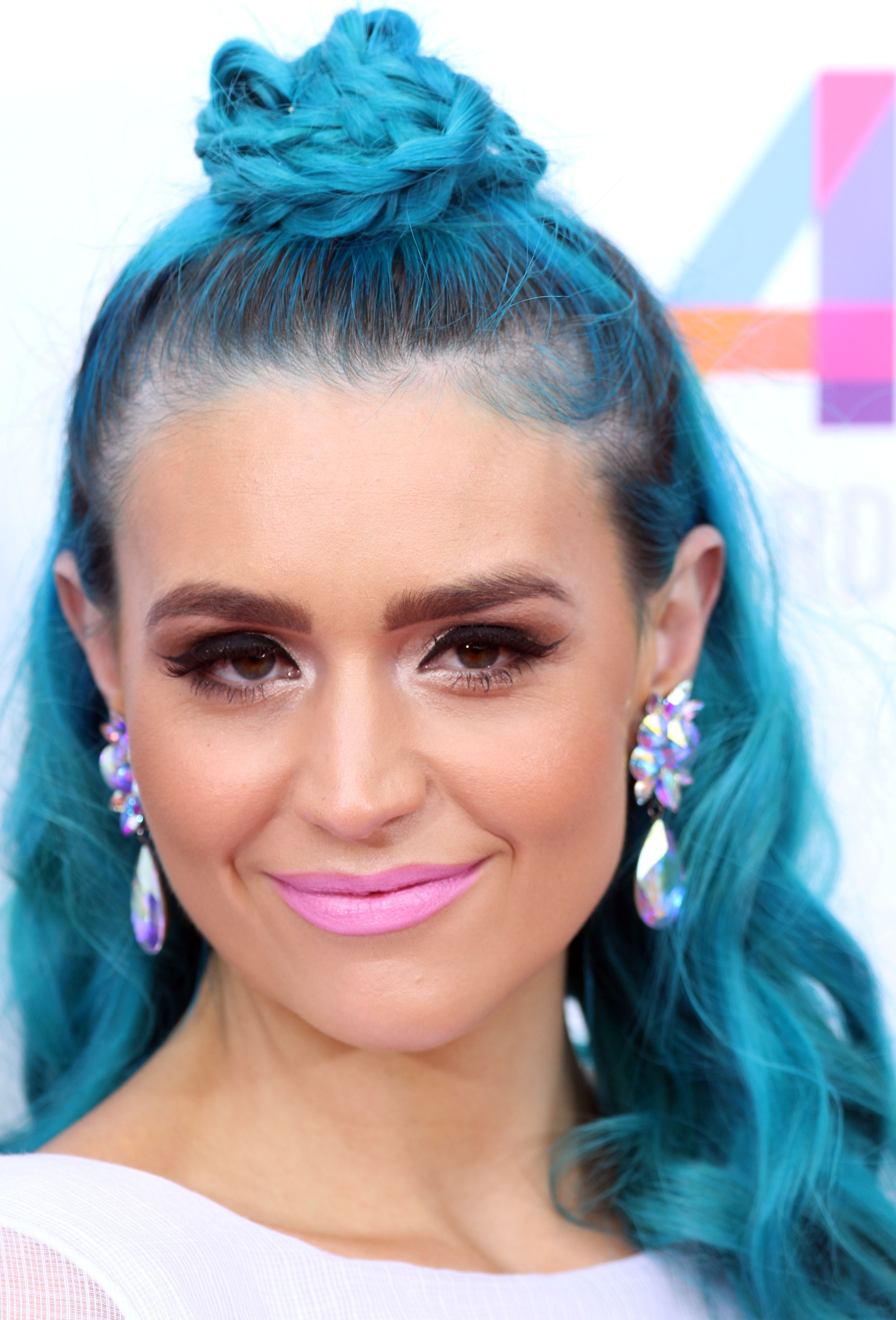
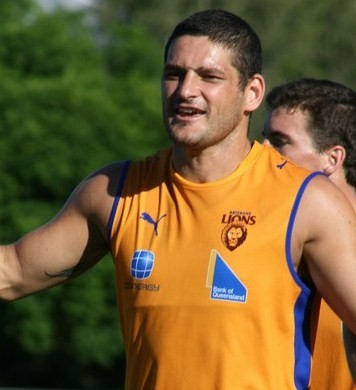
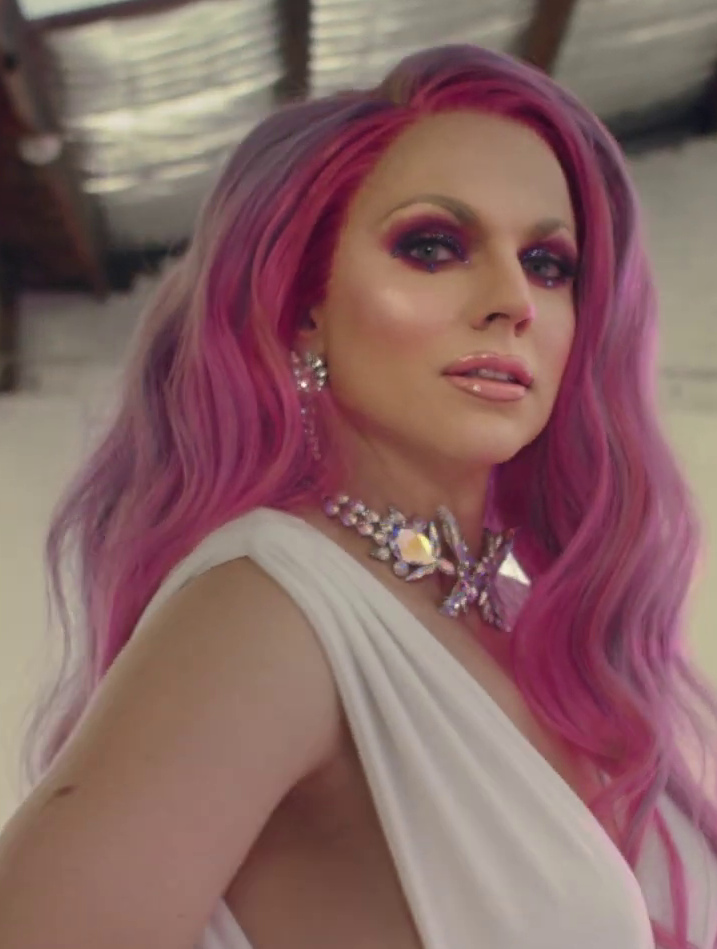
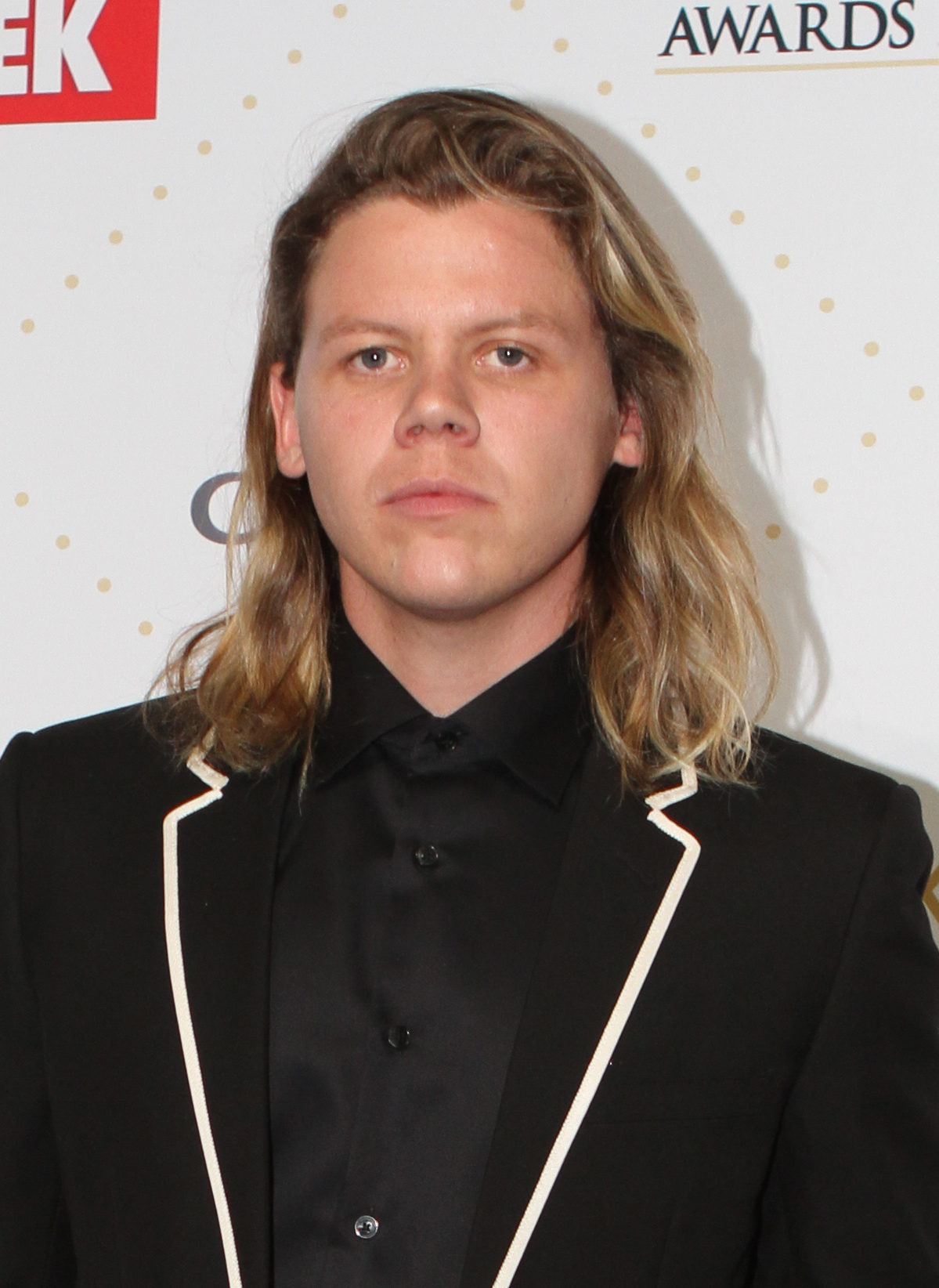
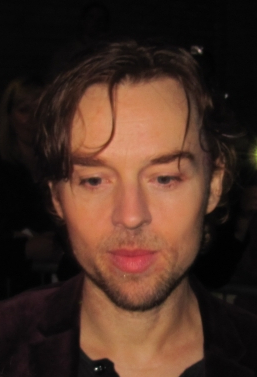
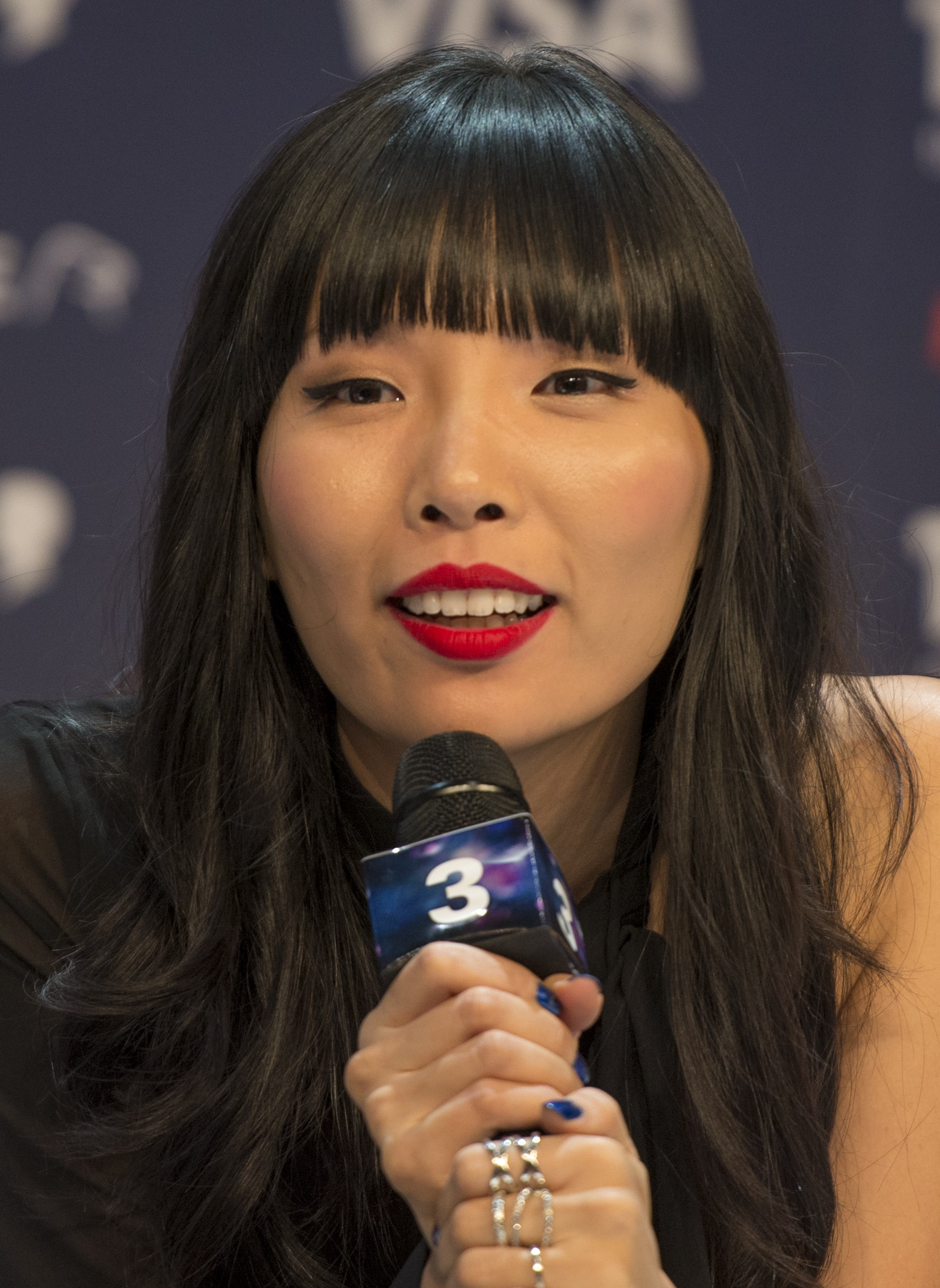
The celebrities who competed in the fifth season of The Masked Singer, pictured in order of elimination (l–r):
Brian Austin Green ("Crash Test Dummy"), Sandra Sully ("Fawn"), Shaynna Blaze ("Bluebottle"), Charlotte Crosby ("Space Fairy"), Pete Murray ("Tiny"), La Toya Jackson ("Burger Gal"), Amy Sheppard ("Orca"), Brendan Fevola ("The Captain"), Courtney Act ("Cow Girl"), Conrad Sewell ("Bouncer"), Darren Hayes ("Grim Reaper") and Dami Im ("Snow Fox")
Not pictured: Summer Warne ("Bad Avocado")

== Episodes ==
=== Episode 1 (11 September) ===
Performances on the first episode
#	Stage name	Song	Identity	Result
1	Cowgirl	"Wannabe" by Spice Girls	undisclosed	SAFE
2	Crash Test Dummy	"Stitches" by Shawn Mendes	Brian Austin Green	OUT
3	Space Fairy	"Hit 'Em Up Style (Oops!)" by Blu Cantrell	undisclosed	SAFE
4	Bad Avocado	"Better Days" by Neiked, Mae Muller, J Balvin & Polo G	undisclosed	SAFE
5	Grim Reaper	"When the Party's Over" by Billie Eilish	undisclosed	SAFE

=== Episode 2 (18 September) ===
Performances on the second episode
#	Stage name	Song	Identity	Result
1	Snow Fox	"Addicted to You" by Avicii	undisclosed	SAFE
2	Tiny	"Walking on Sunshine" by Katrina and the Waves	undisclosed	SAFE
3	Fawn	"Don't Cha" by The Pussycat Dolls	Sandra Sully	OUT
4	Bouncer	"Hit the Road Jack" by Ray Charles	undisclosed	SAFE
5	Bluebottle	"I Say a Little Prayer" by Aretha Franklin	undisclosed	SAFE

=== Episode 3 (25 September) ===
Performances on the third episode
#	Stage name	Song	Result	
1	Grim Reaper	"Unholy" by Sam Smith and Kim Petras	SAFE	
2	Space Fairy	"Always on My Mind" by Elvis Presley	RISK	
3	Cowgirl	"Flowers" by Miley Cyrus	SAFE	
4	Bad Avocado	"Yellow" by Coldplay	RISK	
Duel			Identity	Result
1	Space Fairy	"Born to Be Wild" by Steppenwolf	undisclosed	SAFE
2	Bad Avocado	"Born to Be Wild" by Steppenwolf	Summer Warne	OUT

=== Episode 4 (2 October) ===
Performances on the fourth episode
#	Stage name	Song	Result	
1	Snow Fox	"2 Be Loved" by Lizzo	SAFE	
2	Tiny	"God Only Knows" by The Beach Boys	RISK	
3	Bluebottle	"Call Me" by Blondie	RISK	
4	Bouncer	"You're the Voice" by John Farnham	SAFE	
Duel			Identity	Result
1	Tiny	"A Little Less Conversation" by Elvis Presley	undisclosed	SAFE
2	Bluebottle	"A Little Less Conversation" by Elvis Presley	Shaynna Blaze	OUT

=== Episode 5 (9 October) ===
- Group number: "Lifestyles of the Rich and Famous" by Good Charlotte

Performances on the fifth episode
#	Stage name	Song	Identity	Result
Wildcard	Orca	"ABCDEFU" by Gayle	undisclosed	SAFE
2	Grim Reaper	"Oops!... I Did It Again" by Britney Spears	undisclosed	SAFE
3	Space Fairy	"Lips Are Movin" by Meghan Trainor	Charlotte Crosby	OUT
4	Cowgirl	"Not Pretty Enough" by Kasey Chambers	undisclosed	SAFE

=== Episode 6 (16 October) ===
- Group number: "Run" by Becky Hill & Galantis

Performances on the sixth episode
#	Stage name	Song	Identity	Result
Wildcard	Burger Gal	"Call Me Maybe" by Carly Rae Jepsen	undisclosed	SAFE
2	Snow Fox	"Alone" by Heart	undisclosed	SAFE
3	Tiny	"Wrapped Around Your Finger" by Post Malone	Pete Murray	OUT
4	Bouncer	"If I Can't Have You" by Shawn Mendes	undisclosed	SAFE

=== Episode 7 (23 October) – "Time Machine" ===
Performances on the seventh episode
#	Stage name	Song	Decade	Identity	Result
1	Snow Fox	"Respect" by Aretha Franklin	1960's	undisclosed	SAFE
2	Bouncer	"Until I Found You" by Stephen Sanchez & Em Beihold	2020's	undisclosed	SAFE
3	Cowgirl	"Here You Come Again" by Dolly Parton	1970's	undisclosed	SAFE
4	Orca	"If I Could Turn Back Time" by Cher	1980's	undisclosed	SAFE
5	Burger Gal	"Kiss Me More" by Doja Cat feat. SZA	2020's	La Toya Jackson	OUT
6	Grim Reaper	"Breathe Again" by Toni Braxton	1990's	undisclosed	SAFE

=== Episode 8 (24 October) – "Heroes, Legends & Icons" ===
Performances on the eighth episode
#	Stage name	Song	Identity	Result
1	Bouncer	"A Sky Full of Stars" by Coldplay	undisclosed	SAFE
2	Snow Fox	"Goodbye Yellow Brick Road" by Elton John	undisclosed	SAFE
3	Orca	"Dreams" by Fleetwood Mac	Amy Sheppard	OUT
4	Grim Reaper	"Knockin' on Heaven's Door" by Bob Dylan	undisclosed	SAFE
5	Cowgirl	"Just Dance" by Lady Gaga	undisclosed	SAFE

=== Episode 9 (30 October) ===
Performances on the ninth episode
#	Stage name	Song	Identity	Result
1	Grim Reaper	"I Ain't Worried" by OneRepublic	undisclosed	SAFE
2	Cowgirl	"What About Me" by Shannon Noll	undisclosed	SAFE
Wildcard	The Captain	"Hey Baby" by DJ Ötzi	Brendan Fevola	OUT
4	Snow Fox	"Castles" by Freya Ridings	undisclosed	SAFE
5	Bouncer	"Even When I'm Sleeping" by Leonardo's Bride	undisclosed	SAFE

=== Episode 10 (31 October) ===
- Group number: "Alive" by Sia

Performances on the tenth episode
#	Stage name	Song	Identity	Result
1	Cowgirl	"We Are Young" by Fun feat. Janelle Monáe	Courtney Act	OUT
2	Snow Fox	"Both Sides, Now" by Joni Mitchell	undisclosed	SAFE
3	Grim Reaper	"In Your Eyes" by The Weeknd	undisclosed	SAFE
4	Bouncer	"I'd Do Anything for Love (But I Won't Do That)" by Meat Loaf	undisclosed	SAFE

=== Episode 12 (7 November) – Finale ===
- Group number: "I'm So Excited" by The Pointer Sisters

Performances on the twelfth episode
#	Stage name	Song	Identity	Result
1	Grim Reaper	"Who Wants to Live Forever" by Queen	Darren Hayes	RUNNER-UP
2	Bouncer	"Apologize" by Timbaland & OneRepublic	Conrad Sewell	THIRD
3	Snow Fox	"Dangerous Woman" by Ariana Grande	Dami Im	WINNER

- After being unmasked, Sewell performed "Rolling Thunder" from his album Precious as his encore performance.

== Reception ==
=== Ratings ===
No.	Title	Air date	Timeslot	Overnight ratings		Consolidated ratings		Total viewers	Ref(s)
No.	Title	Air date	Timeslot	Viewers	Rank	Viewers	Rank	Total viewers	Ref(s)
1	Episode 1 Mask Reveal	11 September 2023	Monday 7:30 pm	449,000 (Note: Originally announced as a combined figure of 463,000 viewers and ranked 11th.) 560,000	13 8	87,000 79,000	13 9	819,000 982,000	
2	Episode 2 Mask Reveal	18 September 2023	Monday 7:30 pm	381,000 526,000	18 10	59,000 78,000	17 9	683,000 925,000	
3	Episode 3 Mask Reveal	25 September 2023	Monday 7:30 pm	371,000 459,000	19 14	75,000 88,000	17 14	663,000 814,000	
4	Episode 4 Mask Reveal	2 October 2023	Monday 7:30 pm	363,000 477,000	17 10	61,000 66,000	16 11	632,000 826,000	
5	Episode 5 Mask Reveal	9 October 2023	Monday 7:30 pm	344,000 459,000	17 14	71,000 97,000	16 11	633,000 864,000	
6	Episode 6 Mask Reveal	16 October 2023	Monday 7:30 pm	315,000 452,000	19 13	42,000 50,000	16 13	561,000 782,000	
7	Episode 7 Mask Reveal	23 October 2023	Monday 7:30 pm	349,000 490,000	17 12	30,000 43,000	17 11	603,000 831,000	
8	Episode 8 Mask Reveal	24 October 2023	Tuesday 7:30 pm	331,000 401,000	16 12	30,000 29,000	15 12	568,000 692,000	
9	Episode 9 Mask Reveal	30 October 2023	Monday 7:30 pm	364,000 520,000	15 10	27,000 43,000	17 12	593,000 837,000	
10	Episode 10 Mask Reveal	31 October 2023	Tuesday 7:30 pm	368,000 478,000	12 8	37,000 50,000	12 9	621,000 793,000	
11	The Masked Singer: Greatest Hits "Road to Grand Finale"	6 November 2023	Monday 7:30 pm	379,000	14	32,000	15	614,000	
12	Grand Finale The Final Reveal	7 November 2023	Tuesday 7:30 pm	511,000 594,000	11 9	27,000 26,000	10 7	829,000 965,000	
