= Life (Conrad Sewell album) =

Studio album by Conrad Sewell
- Released: 17 May 2019
- Recorded: Los Angeles, California
- Length: 51:42
- Label: 300 Entertainment; Sony Music Australia

Conrad Sewell chronology
Ghosts & Heartaches (2018)	Life (2019)	Precious (2023)

Singles from Life
- 1. "Changing" Released: 5 September 2018; 2. "Love Me Anyway" Released: 14 February 2019; 3. "Life" Released: 10 May 2019; 4. "Big World" Released: 13 September 2019

Life is the debut studio album by Australian singer songwriter Conrad Sewell. The album was written and recorded in Los Angeles over four years, and features collaborations with Grammy-nominated artists Jamie Hartman, Busbee and Stuart Crichton. Life was released on 17 May 2019.

The album was supported by an Australian national Life tour throughout May and June 2019.

Upon the album's announcement in February 2019, Sewell said "This album pretty much sums up my life to date. A lot of the album was inspired by my battles with addiction, regrets I have as a result of those battles, and the people I've hurt along the way. These were hard truths that I've had to come to terms with." He added "Although the underlying message in most of the songs is one of redemption and hope that people can change... I suppose that's what the journey of life is all about. I wanted to make a classic timeless album with songs that will hopefully be played 50 years from now. No bells and whistles, just my truth and my voice singing with every ounce of pain and love that I have."

At the Queensland Music Awards of 2020, Life won Highest Selling Album.

== Singles ==
"Changing" is the album's lead single, released on 5 September 2018 and peaked at number 91 in Australia. The song is an apology to an ex-girlfriend, with Sewell telling her never to change for anyone.

"Love Me Anyway" is the album's second single and released on 14 February 2019 as an album pre-order track. Sewell said the song is one of his favourites on the album and is about loving someone for who they are. Hit FM said the song is a "...wedding song, proposal song, basically anything romantic because this song is a sure-fire love tune."

The title track "Life" was sent to radio in May as the album's third single.

"Big World" was sent to radio on 13 September as the album's fourth single.

The album includes "Start Again" from Sewell's 2015 All I Know EP and the songs "Healing Hands" and "Come Clean" from his 2018 Ghosts & Heartaches EP.

== Reception ==
Professional ratings
Review scores
Source	Rating
auspOp	5/5 stars
Beat Magazine	8/10 stars

David from auspOp gave the album 5 out of 5 saying "I am really impressed with the honesty and realness Conrad has brought to his debut album. He's been able to live and translate those experiences into brilliant songs we get to hear... Life is about living it, respecting it and finding your place in the world. And find it he has".

Rhys McKenzie from Beat magazine said "You could guess from the album title, Sewell gives us, over the course of fifteen tracks, a slice of life; his life in fact. He ponders over his past regrets with such tracks as 'Come Clean', 'City of Angels' and 'Changing'... he contemplates his hopes and dreams, adding sweetness and plenty of perspective to the album. Largely a piano-driven record, you get the feeling that you may be listening to the same song over and over again, but that doesn't take away from the sentiment. His debut LP, it's remarkable how quickly Sewell has found his voice".

Jeff Jenkins from Stack Magazine said "Conrad Sewell has certainly packed a lot of living into his 31 years, and it's all here on his aptly titled and eagerly awaited debut album" adding "Sewell's precocious talent prevails. What a voice!"

Amy Campbell from GQ Magazine said "Life is lyrically brave, musically stripped back and, vocally, it's a masterpiece."

== Track listing ==
All credits and track listing adapted from Apple Music metadata.

No.	Title	Writer(s)	Producer(s)	Length
1.	"Testify"	Conrad Sewell; Stuart Crichton; Jamie N Commons	Crichton	2:06
2.	"Changing"	Sewell; Jamie Hartman; David Gibson	Hartman; Dan Heath	3:27
3.	"Healing Hands"	Sewell; Stephen Wrabel; Crichton	Crichton	4:10
4.	"Big World"	Sewell; Pär Westerlund; Bryce Fox	Paro	3:55
5.	"Neighbourhood"	Sewell; Fernando Garibay; Hartman; Martijn Konijnenburg	Garibay	3:34
6.	"Life"	Sewell; Crichton; Tommy Lee James	Crichton	3:22
7.	"Love Me Anyway"	Sewell; Jessica Ashley Karpov; Crichton	Crichton	3:17
8.	"Light in the Dark"	Sewell; Crichton; Konijnenburg	Tienus	3:09
9.	"Come Clean"	Sewell; Michael Busbee; Whitney Phillips	busbee	3:05
10.	"Unbound"	Charlie Midnight; Hartman	Hartman	3:48
11.	"Belong"	Sewell; Hartman	Hartman	3:01
12.	"Turn of the Knife"	Sewell; Hartman	Hartman	4:10
13.	"How to Love a Ghost"	Sewell; Rory Andrew	Andrew	3:39
14.	"City of Angels"	Sewell; Andrew; Konijnenburg	Tienus	3:18
15.	"Start Again"	Sewell; Hartman	Hartman	3:41
Total length:				51:42

Note

- "Life" is stylised in all caps

== Charts ==
=== Weekly charts ===
Chart (2019)	Peak position
Australian Albums (ARIA)	1

=== Year-end charts ===
Chart (2019)	Position
Australian Albums (ARIA)	53

== See also ==
- List of number-one albums of 2019 (Australia)

== Release history ==
Country	Date	Format	Label	Catalogue
Australia	17 May 2019	Digital download, CD,	300 Entertainment, Sony Music Australia	19075940692
Australia	6 December 2019	Vinyl	Sony Music Australia	19075940691
