= Ghosts & Heartaches =

EP by Conrad Sewell
- Released: 18 May 2018
- Label: Sony Music Australia

Conrad Sewell chronology
All I Know (2015)	Ghosts & Heartaches (2018)	Life (2019)

Singles from Ghosts & Heartaches
- 1. "Healing Hands" Released: 18 May 2018

Ghosts & Heartaches is the second extended play by Australian singer songwriter Conrad Sewell, featuring two tracks "Come Clean" and "Healing Hands". The EP was released on 18 May 2018. Sales of Ghosts & Heartaches counted towards the song "Healing Hands".

Sewell told Billboard the songs are about him evolving: "I've been on the road for two years with Kygo and different people and been trying to figure myself out and my sound...and along with that comes a lot of change within yourself."

Upon release, Sewell said: "I was with a girl that I loved so much she made me want to stop partying the way I did, but, I didn't. The whole situation was driving me crazy at the time and the words poured out in the studio. It opened the gates to the rawer lyrics that seeped into the new stuff."

Sewell performed "Healing Hands" on The Voice Australia on 10 June 2018.

== Reception ==
Bryan Kress from Billboard said "The songs display a vulnerable yet resilient side to Sewell, exhibited by his powerful vocals and confessional lyrics."

== Track listing ==
Digital download
No.	Title	Length
1.	"Come Clean (written by Conrad Sewell, Whitney Phillips & busbee)"	3:05
2.	"Healing Hands (written by Sewell, Stephen Wrabel & Stuart Chrichton)"	4:10

== Release history ==
Region	Date	Format	Label	Catalogue
Australia	18 May 2018	Digital download, streaming	Sony Music Australia	N/A
Australia	8 June 2018	CD single	Sony Music Australia	19075866222
