= Remind Me (Conrad Sewell song) =

Single by Conrad Sewell

from the album All I Know
- Released: 5 February 2016
- Genre: Pop
- Length: 3:07
- Label: 300
- Songwriter(s): Conrad Sewell; Jamie Hartman; Steve James; Dave Gibson
- Producer(s): Louis Bell

Conrad Sewell singles chronology
"Who You Lovin" (2015)	"Remind Me" (2016)	"Taste the Feeling" (2016)

"Remind Me" is the fourth solo single by Australian singer Conrad Sewell. It was released on 5 February 2016 and taken from his debut extended play, All I Know.

The song was used in television commercials, promoting the 2016 season of Home and Away.

Sewell said "The lyric came from missing someone or finishing a relationship or even someone that's just not around anymore in your life. You know, it's love and loss."

A Steve James remix was released on 15 April 2016. A Matvey Emerson remix was released on 6 May 2016.

== Music video ==
The video was released on 18 March 2016.

== Charts ==
Chart (2016)	Peak position
Australia (ARIA)	22
