= Taste the Feeling =

Single by Avicii and Conrad Sewell
- Released: 11 March 2016
- Recorded: January 2016
- Genre: Alternative dance; pop rock
- Length: 3:11
- Label: Avicii; Universal Music; 300
- Songwriters: Tim Bergling; Scott Fritz; Joshua H. Jones; Jeremy Bircher
- Producer: Avicii

Avicii singles chronology
"Broken Arrows" (2015)	"Taste the Feeling" (2016)	"Without You" (2017)

Conrad Sewell singles chronology
"Remind Me" (2016)	"Taste the Feeling" (2016)	"Sex, Love & Water" (2018)

Audio
- "Taste The Feeling (Avicii Vs. Conrad Sewell)" on YouTube

"Taste the Feeling" is a song by Swedish DJ Avicii and Australian singer Conrad Sewell. The song was released as a digital download in March 2016, in promotion of Coca-Cola's "Taste the Feeling" campaign, and Coke's UEFA Euro 2016 and 2016 Summer Olympics campaigns.

== Composition ==
Avicii said in a statement; "It means a lot to be involved in this project. When Coca-Cola approached me about making their anthem for the UEFA Euro 2016 campaign I could tell that it was going to be a really fun and a creative way to make a track that would connect with one of the biggest football events in the world". Sewell said; "Working with Avicii was great. He's a genuine lad and incredibly talented. I've always been a fan of his production. Being able to spend time with him at his studio in Sweden was great, because it gave us an opportunity to really vibe and get to know each other. We had a chance to dig in and make the song a great balance of both of our musical signatures, and feel like we created something that we are both proud of and can stand alone as a great piece of music, hopefully even a hit!"

== Development ==
At some point of the song's production, a demo version was recorded by British singer Jess Glynne, before being given to Conrad Sewell.

The demo was leaked in December 2024, taken from Ubisoft's servers of a rehearsal of the routine that was released inside the Just Dance Unlimited service.

== Critical reception ==
Robbie Daw of Idolator wrote; "'Taste The Feeling' finds Aussie vocalist Sewell crooning about standing on the shore but yearning to 'grab another Coke' and take a dive. It's basically the same type of harmless, feel-good pop track Chris Brown whipped together in 2008 for Wrigley's, with Doublemint smash 'Forever,' except this one doesn't quite have the lasting, um, flavor 'Forever' did."

John Cameron of We Got This Covered wrote; "Just when you thought Avicii couldn't get any Avicii-er, the Swedish superstar DJ/producer has managed to discard any semblance of street cred he might still have had. As part of an ad campaign with Coca-Cola, he teamed up with vocalist Conrad Sewell on 'Taste The Feeling,' which has to be the most repulsively generic piece of music on which either artist will ever put their name."

== Credits and personnel ==
- Producers – Avicii
- Lyrics – Conrad Sewell

== Charts ==
Chart (2016)	Peak position
Austria (Ö3 Austria Top 40)	17
France (SNEP)	136
Germany (GfK)	53
Latvia (Latvijas Top 40)	40
Portugal (AFP)	97
Slovenia (SloTop50)	15
Sweden (Sverigetopplistan)	60

== Certifications ==
Region	Certification	Certified units/sales
Brazil (Pro-Música Brasil)	Gold	30,000^{‡}
^{‡} Sales+streaming figures based on certification alone.
