= Voices (Hurts song) =

2020 single by Hurts

Single by Hurts

from the album Faith
- Released: 15 May 2020
- Length: 3:09
- Label: Lento
- Songwriter(s): Martin Forslund; Dave Gibson; Adam Anderson; Theo Hutchcraft
- Producer(s): Hurts; Martin Forslund

Hurts singles chronology
"Chaperone" (2017)	"Voices" (2020)	"Suffer" (2020)

Lyric video
- "Hurts - Voices (Official Lyric Video)" on YouTube

"Voices" is a song by English musical duo Hurts from their fifth studio album, Faith (2020). It was released on 15 May 2020 as the lead single from the album, along with an accompanying lyric video in which the band performed the song in a glass box, under strobe lighting. The duo wrote the song along with Martin Forslund and Dave Gibson, while the production was taken by Forslund and Hurts themselves.

== Credits and personnel ==
- Theo Hutchcraft – songwriting, production, vocals
- Adam Anderson – songwriting, production
- Martin Forslund – songwriting
- Dave Gibson - songwriting
- Matty Green – mixing engineer

== Charts ==
Chart (2020)	Peak position
Russia (Tophit)	127
UK Download (OCC)	88

== Release history ==
Region	Date	Format	Label	Ref.
United Kingdom	15 May 2020	Digital download; streaming	Lento	
