= Faith (Hurts album) =

Studio album by Hurts
- Released: 4 September 2020
- Genre: Pop rock, electronic rock
- Length: 44:45
- Label: Lento
- Producer: Hurts

Hurts chronology
| Desire (2017) | Faith (2020) |

Singles from Faith
- 1. "Voices" Released: 15 May 2020; 2. "Suffer" Released: 24 June 2020; 3. "Redemption" Released: 16 July 2020; 4. "Somebody" Released: 30 July 2020

Professional ratings
Review scores
| Source | Rating |
|---|---|
| AllMusic | 3.5/5 stars |

Faith is the fifth studio album by the English synth-pop duo Hurts. It was released on 4 September 2020 by Lento Records. The album was preceded by the singles "Voices", "Suffer", "Redemption" and "Somebody".

== Background ==
In June 2020, along with the release of the second single, "Suffer", Hurts announced that their new album would be released on 4 September 2020.

== Promotion ==
=== Singles ===
"Voices" was released as the lead single from the album on 15 May 2020. The song peaked at number 88 on the UK Download Chart. "Suffer" was released as the second single from the album on 24 June 2020. "Redemption" was released as the third single from the album on 16 July 2020. The fourth single from the album, "Somebody", was released on 30 July 2020.

== Track listing ==
Faith track listing
| No. | Title | Writer(s) | Producer(s) | Length |
|---|---|---|---|---|
| 1. | "Voices" | Martin Forslund; Dave Gibson; Adam Anderson; Theo Hutchcraft | Hurts; Martin Forslund | 3:09 |
| 2. | "Suffer" | Forslund; Anderson; Hutchcraft | Hurts; Forslund | 4:27 |
| 3. | "Fractured" | Forslund; Anderson; Hutchcraft | Hurts; Forslund | 2:59 |
| 4. | "Slave to Your Love" | Chenai Zinyuku; Anderson; Hutchcraft | Hurts | 5:24 |
| 5. | "All I Have to Give" | Anderson; Hutchcraft | Hurts | 3:52 |
| 6. | "Liar" | Anderson; Hutchcraft | Hurts | 3:49 |
| 7. | "Somebody" | Joe Janiak; Anderson; Hutchcraft | Janiak; Hurts | 3:01 |
| 8. | "Numb" | Anderson; Hutchcraft | Hurts | 4:05 |
| 9. | "Redemption" | Anderson; Hutchcraft | Hurts | 4:18 |
| 10. | "White Horses" | Anderson; Hutchcraft | Hurts | 5:17 |
| 11. | "Darkest Hour" | Anderson; Hutchcraft | Hurts | 4:24 |
| Total length: | | | | 44:45 |

== Charts ==
Chart performance for Faith
| Chart (2020) | Peak position |
|---|---|
| Austrian Albums (Ö3 Austria) | 8 |
| Belgian Albums (Ultratop Flanders) | 138 |
| Czech Albums (ČNS IFPI) | 71 |
| Dutch Albums (Album Top 100) | 59 |
| Finnish Albums (Suomen virallinen lista) | 40 |
| German Albums (Offizielle Top 100) | 9 |
| Polish Albums (ZPAV) | 15 |
| Scottish Albums (OCC) | 5 |
| Swiss Albums (Schweizer Hitparade) | 10 |
| UK Albums (OCC) | 21 |

== Release history ==
Release formats for Faith
| Region | Date | Format | Label |
|---|---|---|---|
| United Kingdom | 4 September 2020 | Digital download; streaming; CD; cassette; LP | Lento |
