= Healing Hands (Conrad Sewell song) =

Single by Conrad Sewell

from the EP Ghosts & Heartaches and the album Life
- Released: 18 May 2018
- Genre: Pop
- Length: 4:10
- Label: Sony Music Australia
- Songwriter(s): Conrad Sewell; Stephen Wrabel; Stuart Crichton
- Producer(s): Stuart Crichton

Conrad Sewell singles chronology
| "Sex, Love & Water" (2018) | "Healing Hands" (2018) | "Changing" (2018) |

"Healing Hands" is a pop song by Australian singer Conrad Sewell. It was released to radio on 18 May 2018 and served as the lead single from Sewell's second extended play, Ghosts & Heartaches. The song peaked at number seven on the Australian ARIA Singles Chart.

Sewell performed "Healing Hands" on The Voice Australia on 10 June 2018. At the ARIA Music Awards of 2018, the song was nominated for Song of the Year. At the APRA Music Awards of 2019, the song was nominated for Pop Work of the Year.

== Music video ==
The music video for "Healing Hands" was directed by Tyler Dunning Evans and released on 28 June 2018.

== Charts ==
=== Weekly charts ===
| Chart (2018) | Peak position |
|---|---|
| Australia (ARIA) | 7 |

=== Year-end charts ===
| Chart (2018) | Position |
|---|---|
| Australia (ARIA) | 56 |

== Certifications ==
| Region | Certification | Certified units/sales |
|---|---|---|
| Australia (ARIA) | 3× Platinum | 210,000^{‡} |
| New Zealand (RMNZ) | Gold | 15,000^{‡} |
^{‡} Sales+streaming figures based on certification alone.

== Release history ==
| Region | Date | Format | Label |
|---|---|---|---|
| Australia | 18 May 2018 | Streaming; digital download; airplay | Sony Music Australia |
