= Life (Conrad Sewell song) =

Single by Conrad Sewell

from the album Life
- Released: 10 May 2019
- Length: 3:22
- Label: Sony Music Australia
- Songwriter(s): Conrad Sewell; Stuart Crichton; Tommy Lee James
- Producer(s): Stuart Crichton

Conrad Sewell singles chronology
"Love Me Anyway" (2019)	"Life" (2019)	"Who Am I" (2019)

"Life" is a song by Australian singer Conrad Sewell, written by Sewell, Stuart Crichton and Tommy Lee James. It was released on 10 May 2019 as the third single from his debut studio album, Life (2019).

== Music video ==
The music video for "Life" was directed by Guy Franklin and released on 9 July 2019. Hit Radio said "The clip shows Conrad at his best. Belting out one of his heart wrenching songs and captivating the viewer. The singer is joined by crisp, white clad violinists, completing the stunning yet powerful clip."

== Charts ==
Chart performance for "Life"
Chart (2019)	Peak position
Australia Digital Tracks (ARIA)	15

== Release history ==
Region	Date	Format	Label
Australia	10 May 2019	Contemporary hit radio	Sony Music Australia
