= Sex, Love & Water =

- Radio version

Single by Armin van Buuren featuring Conrad Sewell

from the album A State of Trance 2018
- Released: 2 February 2018
- Genre: Funk; soul; nu-disco (radio version); Electro house (club mix)
- Length: 3:18
- Label: Armada; Armind
- Songwriters: Armin van Buuren; Angel Lopez; Scott Storch; Conrad Sewell; Fiora Cutler; Charles Edward Treece
- Producers: Armin van Buuren; Angel Lopez; Scott Storch

Armin van Buuren singles chronology
"Be in the Moment (ASOT 850 Anthem)" (2017)	"Sex, Love & Water" (2018)	"Therapy" (2018)

Conrad Sewell singles chronology
"Taste the Feeling" (2017)	"Sex, Love & Water" (2018)	"Healing Hands" (2018)

Alternative cover
- Club mix

"Sex, Love & Water" is a song by Dutch DJ and record producer Armin van Buuren. It features the vocals from Australian singer-songwriter Conrad Sewell. The song was released by Armada Music as a digital download on 2 February 2018. The song was written by van Buuren, Sewell, Angel Lopez, Scott Storch, Fiora Cutler, and Charles Edward Treece, and it was produced by van Buuren, Lopez, and Storch.

== Track listing ==
- Digital download
1. "Sex, Love & Water" – 3:17
- Digital download – extended mix
1. "Sex, Love & Water" (extended mix) – 5:54
- Digital download – club mix
1. "Sex, Love & Water" (club mix) – 2:45
2. "Sex, Love & Water" (extended club mix) – 5:28

== Charts ==
=== Weekly charts ===
Weekly chart performance
Chart (2018)	Peak position
Belgium (Ultratip Bubbling Under Flanders)	25
Belgium (Ultratip Bubbling Under Wallonia)	13
Hungary (Rádiós Top 40)	15
Netherlands (Dutch Top 40)	28
Netherlands (Single Top 100)	93
US Dance Airplay (Billboard)	13

=== Year-end charts ===
Annual chart rankings
Chart (2018)	Position
Hungary (Rádiós Top 40)	56
Netherlands Airplay (Airplay Top 40)	79
