= Changing (Conrad Sewell song) =

Single by Conrad Sewell

from the album Life
- Released: 5 September 2018
- Genre: Pop
- Length: 3:27
- Label: Sony Music Australia
- Songwriter(s): Conrad Sewell; Jamie Hartman; David Gibson
- Producer(s): Jamie Hartman; Dan Heath

Conrad Sewell singles chronology
"Healing Hands" (2018)	"Changing" (2018)	"Love Me Anyway" (2019)

"Changing" is a pop song by Australian singer Conrad Sewell, written by Sewell, Jamie Hartman and Dave Gibson. It was released on 5 September 2018 as the lead single from his debut studio album, Life (2019). The song has peaked at number 91 on the Australian ARIA Singles Chart.

== Background and release ==
Upon release Sewell said the song is an apology to an ex-girlfriend, telling never to change for anyone. He explains "I wrote it right in the middle of the relationship I was in when I started to realise that I was ruining it, and that my actions were starting to affect her. I would come home and see her crying. She was always upset. She wasn't the same person that she was when we first started dating. And I felt like it was because of me and the way I was acting."

== Music video ==
The music video for "Changing" was directed by Matt Earl and released on 16 October 2018.

== Reception ==
The Prelude Press described the song as "vulnerable and emotional". Power FM described the song as "a stripped back ballad that shows the Aussie powerhouse's penchant for bold and masterful songwriting."

== Charts ==
Chart (2018)	Peak position
Australia (ARIA)	91

== Release history ==
Region	Date	Format	Label
Australia	5 September 2018	Streaming; digital download; airplay	Sony Music Australia
