= Who You Lovin =

- Digital cover

Single by Conrad Sewell

from the album All I Know
- Released: 6 October 2015
- Genre: Pop
- Length: 3:52
- Label: 300
- Songwriters: Jamie Hartman; Jacob Kasher Hindlin; Will Lobban-Bean; Sean Douglas
- Producer: Cook Classics

Conrad Sewell singles chronology
"Start Again" (2015)	"Who You Lovin" (2015)	"Remind Me" (2016)

"Who You Lovin" is the third solo single by Australian singer Conrad Sewell. It was made available on 6 October 2015 and taken from his debut extended play, All I Know.

"Who You Lovin" is the result of a writing sessions with Jamie Hartman (Christina Aguilera, Joss Stone), Jacob Kash (Maroon 5, Usher, Britney Spears), Sean Douglas (Madonna, Nick Jonas, Backstreet Boys) and Cook Classics (Natalie La Rose, Beyoncé, Cee Lo, Outasight).

== Background ==
Following the release of "Start Again", which went on to peak at number 1 and achieve platinum sales in Australia, Sewell continued to work on music and tour. He also featured on two tracks, "Braver Love" by Arty and "Little Love" by Kilian & Jo.

In September, Sewell announced his new single would be called "Who You Lovin" and on 28 September 2015, Sewell advised fans they can now request "Who You Lovin" at their local radio station and that it will be 'out soon'.

On October 5, Sewell announced the release of his debut extended play, titled All I Know. All I Know will include "Who You Lovin". Sewell performed the song on the New Zealand Good Morning on 8 October 2015 and 'live' for the first time on The X Factor Australia on 20 October 2015.

== Review ==
Kellie Comer of Speaker TV said, "With funk licks, a serious pop kick and Sewell’s oh-so smooth tone, it’s won’t disappoint."

== Charts ==
=== Weekly charts ===
Chart (2015)	Peak position
Australia (ARIA)	17

== Certifications ==
Region	Certification	Certified units/sales
Australia (ARIA)	Gold	35,000^{‡}
^{‡} Sales+streaming figures based on certification alone.
