= Hold Me Up (song) =

Single by Conrad Sewell

from the album All I Know
- Released: 3 March 2015
- Genre: Pop; soul; gospel
- Length: 3:27
- Label: 300
- Songwriter(s): Conrad Sewell; Brian Lee; Saeed Molavi; Nadir Benkahla; Louis Bell; Carl Austin Rosen
- Producer(s): Conrad Sewell; Brian Lee; The Euroz; Louis Bell

Conrad Sewell singles chronology
"Firestone" (2014)	"Hold Me Up" (2015)	"Start Again" (2015)

"Hold Me Up" is the debut solo single by Australian singer Conrad Sewell. It was released on 3 March 2015 and taken from his debut extended play, All I Know.

The song is co-written and co-produced by Sewell and Brian Lee (who has previously worked with Lady Gaga and Icona Pop), The Euroz and Louis Bell. The song was released in Australia on 3 March 2015 and peaked at number 39 on the ARIA Singles Chart. The track was released in the United Kingdom on 24 July. The remixes were released on 20 November.

== Background ==
Sewell moved from Brisbane to Los Angeles to work on his music and in late 2014, provided the vocals on Kygo’s 2014 tropical house hit "Firestone".

On March 2, 2015 Sewell announced his opening slot on Ed Sheeran's 13-date Australian X tour throughout March and April via a video posted on his Facebook page. "Hold Me Up" was released the next day.

"Hold Me Up" emerged from a late-night, free-form session in the studio. Sewell said; "I’ve been doing this thing lately where I set up a mic live, put on some reverb so I feel like I’m singing in front of people, put on a track and just flow a melody over it. It’s been hard for me to get up-tempo songs, because I love nothing more than sitting at the piano and melting your heart—that’s definitely what I’ll tend to do in a writing situation. So when that one came, it was just a fun track that you can dance, drive, sing to, and we can worry about the serious stuff later."

== Music video ==
The monochrome video features Sewell, chilling out and enjoying life down by the beach. The video was released on 12 May 2015.

== Reviews ==
Mike Wass from Idolator said ‘Hold Me Up’ is a "soulful, vaguely disco-tinged pop anthem" and is a huge song with an instantly hummable chorus".

Madison Vain of Entertainment Weekly called the song "an upbeat, anthemic, just-about-impossible-to-not-get-swept-away-in pop track."

AuspOp said ‘Hold Me Up’ is "effortlessly cool, eternally optimistic, vocally impressive and filled with enough pop sunshine to brighten even the greyest of days."

== Track listing ==
Digital download
No.	Title	Length
1.	"Hold Me Up"	3:27

Remixes digital download
No.	Title	Length
1.	"Hold Me Up" (Throttle Remix)	3:40
2.	"Hold Me Up" (eSquire and Petch vs Wayne G Remix)	5:11
3.	"Hold Me Up" (Steve Smart Remix)	5:01
4.	"Hold Me Up" (Slaptop Remix)	4:52
5.	"Hold Me Up" (Cash & David Remix)	4:55
6.	"Hold Me Up" (AM2PM Remix)	5:27
7.	"Hold Me Up" (Mike Delinquent Remix)	4:29

== Charts ==
=== Weekly charts ===
Weekly chart performance for "Hold Me Up"
Chart (2015)	Peak position
Australia (ARIA)	39
Canada CHR/Top 40 (Billboard)	48
Sweden Heatseeker (Sverigetopplistan)	8
US Bubbling Under Hot 100 (Billboard)	10
US Pop Airplay (Billboard)	25

=== Year-end charts ===
2015 year-end chart performance for "Big Girls Cry"
Chart (2015)	Position
Australian Artist Singles (ARIA)	48
