= Start Again (Conrad Sewell song) =

Single by Conrad Sewell

from the EP All I Know and the album LIFE
- Released: 10 March 2015
- Recorded: 2015
- Genre: Pop
- Length: 3:37
- Label: 300
- Songwriters: Conrad Sewell; Jamie Hartman
- Producer: Jamie Hartman

Conrad Sewell singles chronology
"Hold Me Up" (2015)	"Start Again" (2015)	"Who You Lovin" (2015)

"Start Again" is the second solo single by the Australian singer Conrad Sewell. It was released on 10 March 2015 and taken from his first extended play, All I Know. The song was co-written by Sewell and Jamie Hartman. It laments the loss of a lover and the fervent hope for a fresh start. It was released in the United States and Australia on 10 March 2015. The song was almost given to Australian singer Kylie Minogue, but Sewell decided that "it didn't sound like a Kylie song" and continued with his own version of the composition. In an interview on Joy 94.9, Sewell said that he recorded the track in one take and was driven by "pure emotion" that just "came easily". Sewell said, "I need to be singing soulful music like this!"

== Promotion ==
On 11 March 2015, Sewell performed the song live on The Today Show with Kathie Lee and Hoda and Elvis Duran named him the show's artist of the month. His song also appeared on a preview of the Australian TV show Home and Away.

== Music video ==
The music video shows Sewell has come the signs in some parts of starting. It was released on 9 November 2015.

== Track listing ==
Digital download
No.	Title	Length
1.	"Start Again"	3:37

== Charts ==
=== Weekly charts ===
Chart (2015)	Peak position
Australia (ARIA)	1

=== Year-end charts ===
Chart (2015)	Position
Australia (ARIA)	54

== Certifications ==
Region	Certification	Certified units/sales
Australia (ARIA)	Platinum	70,000^{‡}
New Zealand (RMNZ)	Gold	15,000^{‡}
^{‡} Sales+streaming figures based on certification alone.

== See also ==
- List of number-one singles of 2015 (Australia)

== Awards ==
"Start Again" won the ARIA Award for Song of the Year and the ARIA Music Awards of 2015.
