= Redemption (Hurts song) =

2020 single by Hurts

Single by Hurts

from the album Faith
- Released: 16 July 2020
- Genre: Orchestral pop; Soft rock
- Length: 4:18
- Label: Lento
- Songwriters: Adam Anderson; Theo Hutchcraft
- Producer: Hurts

Hurts singles chronology
"Suffer" (2020)	"Redemption" (2020)	"Somebody" (2020)

Music video
- "Redemption" on YouTube

"Redemption" is a song by English musical duo Hurts from their fifth studio album, Faith (2020). It was released on 16 July 2020, as the third single from the album. The duo wrote and produced the song.

== Composition ==
Regarding the song, Theo Hutchcraft declared to NME: "It's a song about fear and doubt. It emerged as a beautiful moment of clarity during one of the most troubled periods of making the album." For the same publication, Adam Anderson called the track "a perfect storm of everything we do well individually, coming together in one moment".

== Track listing ==
- Digital download
1. "Redemption" – 4:18
- Digital download – Kolya Funk Remix
1. "Redemption" (Kolya Funk Remix) – 2:39

== Charts ==
=== Weekly charts ===
Weekly chart performance for "Redemption"
Chart (2021)	Peak position
CIS Airplay (TopHit)	4
Russia Airplay (TopHit)	8
Ukraine Airplay (TopHit)	16

=== Year-end charts ===
Year-end chart performance for "Redemption"
Chart (2021)	Position
CIS (TopHit)	21
Russia Airplay (TopHit)	13
Ukraine Airplay (TopHit)	62

== Release history ==
Region	Date	Format	Version	Label	Ref.
United Kingdom	16 July 2020	Digital download; streaming	Original	Lento	
CIS	27 July 2020	Airplay	Original	Warner Music Russia	
Russia	23 October 2020	Digital download; streaming	Kolya Funk Remix	Warner Music Russia	
