= All I Know (EP) =

EP by Conrad Sewell
- Released: 13 November 2015
- Recorded: 2015
- Genre: Pop
- Length: 21:11
- Label: 300
- Producer: Jamie Hartman; Cook Classics; John Ryan; Louis Bell; Phil Phever

Conrad Sewell chronology
All I Know (2015)	Ghosts & Heartaches (2018)

Singles from All I Know
- 1. "Hold Me Up" Released: 3 March 2015; 2. "Start Again" Released: 10 March 2015; 3. "Who You Lovin" Released: 6 October 2015; 4. "Remind Me" Released: 5 February 2016

All I Know is the debut extended play (EP) by Australian singer Conrad Sewell. It was released on 13 November 2015 by 300 Entertainment. Recorded in Los Angeles, the EP is the result of sessions working with an all-star team of writers and producers, including Jamie Hartman, Jacob Kasher Hindlin and Sean Douglas.

== Background ==
Conrad Sewell became internationally recognised in early 2015 when his collaboration with Kygo, "Firestone", went top 10 in France, Germany and the United Kingdom. The Australian singer capitalised on the buzz by dropping debut single "Hold Me Up" and landed a modest top 40 hit in his home country. However, the 27-year-old later topped the chart with the ballad "Start Again". His debut EP was announced in October along with the release of "Who You Lovin".

== Reception ==
Marcus Floyd of Renowned for Sound gave the album 4 ½ out of 5, saying; "All I Know is a stunning debut EP that shows listeners just what Sewell can do with that phenomenal voice of his. It's diverse too with a balanced amount of ballads and pop numbers and it ends with you wishing it was a full-length record."

Hannah McKee of Stuff.co.nz gave the album 2 ½ out of 5, saying; "There seems to be two sides to this album, The intimate, piano ballad 'Start Again' represents the softer, almost gospel side, followed by 'Remind Me'. Other songs have a Michael Jackson-esque, funky pop flavour to them. All I Know is a quintessential pop album that will do well on the radio waves, but an extra risk or two would not have gone astray."

== Track listing ==
No.	Title	Length
1.	"Start Again"	3:37
2.	"Who You Lovin"	3:52
3.	"Shadow"	3:35
4.	"Hold Me Up"	3:27
5.	"Firestone" (acoustic)	3:30
6.	"Remind Me"	3:07
Total length:		21:11

Australian edition
No.	Title	Length
1.	"Start Again"	3:37
2.	"Who You Lovin"	3:52
3.	"Shadow"	3:35
4.	"Firestone" (acoustic)	3:30
5.	"21 Questions"	3:15
6.	"Remind Me"	3:07
Total length:		20:53

== Charts ==
Chart (2015)	Peak position
Australian Albums (ARIA)	9

== Release history ==
Region	Date	Format	Label
Australia	13 November 2015	CD; digital download	300
United States	8 January 2016	CD; digital download	300
