= Precious (Conrad Sewell album) =

Studio album by Conrad Sewell
- Released: 3 March 2023
- Length: 54:22
- Label: Sony Music Australia
- Producer: Conrad Sewell; James Gass; Roderick Kerr

Conrad Sewell chronology
| Life (2019) | Precious (2023) |

Singles from Precious
- 1. "God Save the Queen" Released: 9 September 2022; 2. "Make Me a Believer" Released: 14 October 2022; 3. "Caroline" Released: 11 November 2022; 4. "Rolling Thunder" Released: 12 December 2022; 5. "Ferris Wheel" Released: 3 February 2023

Precious is the second studio album by Australian singer songwriter Conrad Sewell. The album was announced in October 2023, alongside the album's second single "Make Me a Believer". Precious was released on 3 March 2023 and peaked at number 67 on the ARIA Chart.

In an interview with The Music, Sewell said "The brief, really, was classic songs. Basically, the kind of songs that feel like they could be played at the grocery store every day for the next 20 years. Songs that are absolutely timeless."

== Reception ==
David James Young from The Music said "Sewell exudes confidence when it comes to Precious. He has every right to, as well – it's handily the best thing he's ever made."

Jeff Jenkins from Stack Magazine said "For the most part, Sewell is a funky soul man, but he's also capable of delivering a straight-out pop-rock belter as well as a big pop ballad."

== Track listing ==
| No. | Title | Writer(s) | Producer(s) | Length |
|---|---|---|---|---|
| 1. | "God Save the Queen" | Conrad Sewell; James Gass; Roderick Kerr; Mitchell Lewis; Dan Wolsner | Conrad Sewell; James Gass; Roderick Kerr | 3:36 |
| 2. | "Ferris Wheel" | Sewell; Gass; Kerr; Lewis | Sewell; Gass; Kerr | 4:56 |
| 3. | "Ego" | Sewell; Lewis; Wolsner | Sewell; Gass; Kerr | 4:34 |
| 4. | "Make Me a Believer" | Sewell; Brian Duffy; Martin Estrada; Gass; Kerr; Lewis | Sewell; Gass; Kerr | 4:08 |
| 5. | "Rolling Thunder" | Sewell; Lewis; Wolsner | Sewell; Gass; Kerr | 4:40 |
| 6. | "33" | Sewell; Lewis; Adam MacDougall | Sewell; Gass; Kerr | 3:57 |
| 7. | "Caroline" | Sewell; Lewis; MacDougall | Sewell; Gass; Kerr | 5:23 |
| 8. | "Slipping Away" | Sewell; Michael Fatkin; Gass; Kerr | Sewell; Gass; Kerr | 4:03 |
| 9. | "Blood Sugar" | Sewell; MacDougall | Sewell; Gass; Kerr | 5:57 |
| 10. | "Precious" | Sewell; Gass; Kerr; MacDougall | Sewell; Gass; Kerr | 5:15 |
| 11. | "Bittersweet" | Sewell; Rob Thomas | Sewell; Gass; Kerr | 3:19 |
| 12. | "Tell Mum I Love Her" | Sewell; Lewis; Wolsner | Sewell; Gass; Kerr | 4:29 |
| Total length: | | | | 54:22 |

== Charts ==
Weekly chart performance for Precious
| Chart (2023) | Peak position |
|---|---|
| Australian Albums (ARIA) | 67 |
