= Firestone (song) =

Single by Kygo featuring Conrad Sewell

from the album Cloud Nine
- Released: 1 December 2014
- Recorded: 2014
- Genre: Deep house; tropical house
- Length: 4:32 (album version); 3:24 (radio edit)
- Label: Ultra; RCA
- Songwriters: Kyrre Gørvell-Dahll; Conrad Sewell; Martijn Konijnenburg
- Producer: Kygo

Kygo singles chronology
"Cut Your Teeth (remix)" (2014)	"Firestone" (2014)	"ID" (2015)

Conrad Sewell singles chronology
"Firestone" (2014)	"Hold Me Up" (2015)

Music video
- "Firestone" on YouTube

"Firestone" is a song by Norwegian DJ and record producer Kygo, featuring vocals from Australian singer Conrad Sewell. It was released on 1 December 2014 and reached number one on the Norwegian Singles Chart and became a big international hit for Kygo on many other charts. Birdy performed a cover of the song on BBC Radio 1's Live Lounge.

In 2020, Dutch TV host and music producer Arjen Lubach claimed in his autobiography Stoorzender to be the co-creator of an early demo of the song. According to his account, his friend and fellow musician Martijn Konijnenburg sold the song without giving credits or royalties. Konijnenburg has denied the allegations.

== Music video ==
The music video was released on Kygo's official Vevo channel on 9 March 2015, where it had gained over 1 billion views as of September 2026. The video starts with a young woman (played by Rachel Echelberger, contestant of America's Next Top Model cycle 13) bumping into a guy, who pulls him in and seems about to kiss him before walking off with a suggestive display. He is entranced and follows her through a series of doors that open up into different scenes, such as a forest, parties (where Kygo is seen playing music), a pool, and the dry riverbed in Los Angeles. They briefly reconnect at one of the parties before she leaves again. As he steps up the chase, she continues running, and when he appears to have lost her for good, he loses his temper. However, after he sees her walking casually by in a rugged warehouse loft, the chase continues. At the end of the video, he ends up at the same location where they first met, but on exiting the next door, he finds her standing alone on a building rooftop in the city, where he meets her as the video fades.

== Track listing ==
Digital download
No.	Title	Length
1.	"Firestone" (featuring Conrad Sewell)	4:32

Digital download – Brazil version
No.	Title	Length
1.	"Firestone" (featuring Conrad Sewell)	4:33
2.	"Firestone" (fireworks version; featuring Conrad Sewell)	3:56
3.	"Firestone" (live acoustic version; featuring Conrad Sewell)	3:46
4.	"Hands On Your Body" (ft Basixx And Frigga)	3:11
Total length:		159

== Charts ==
=== Weekly charts ===
Chart (2014–2015)	Peak position
Australia (ARIA)	10
Austria (Ö3 Austria Top 40)	5
Belgium (Ultratop 50 Flanders)	4
Belgium (Ultratop 50 Wallonia)	5
Canada Hot 100 (Billboard)	64
Czech Republic Airplay (ČNS IFPI)	1
Czech Republic Singles Digital (ČNS IFPI)	5
Denmark (Tracklisten)	6
Finland (Suomen virallinen lista)	3
France (SNEP)	5
Germany (GfK)	3
Hungary (Dance Top 40)	7
Hungary (Rádiós Top 40)	1
Hungary (Single Top 40)	4
Ireland (IRMA)	6
Italy (FIMI)	4
Lebanon (OLT20)	1
Mexico (Billboard Mexican Airplay)	4
Mexico Anglo (Monitor Latino)	2
Netherlands (Dutch Top 40)	3
Netherlands (Single Top 100)	4
New Zealand Heatseekers (RMNZ)	8
Norway (VG-lista)	1
Poland Airplay (ZPAV)	1
Scottish Singles Sales (Official Charts)	5
Slovakia Airplay (ČNS IFPI)	2
Slovakia Singles Digital (ČNS IFPI)	6
Slovenia (SloTop50)	5
Spain (Promusicae)	6
Sweden (Sverigetopplistan)	2
Switzerland (Schweizer Hitparade)	4
UK Singles (Official Charts)	8
UK Dance (Official Charts)	1
US Billboard Hot 100	92
US Hot Dance/Electronic Songs (Billboard)	8
US Pop Airplay (Billboard)	35

Special acoustic release featuring Conrad Sewell

Chart (2015)	Peak position^{[A]}
Finland (Suomen virallinen lista)	7

=== Year-end charts ===
Chart (2015)	Position
Australia (ARIA)	37
Austria (Ö3 Austria Top 40)	28
Belgium (Ultratop Flanders)	18
Belgium (Ultratop Wallonia)	18
Germany (Official German Charts)	10
Hungary (Dance Top 40)	25
Hungary (Rádiós Top 40)	15
Hungary (Single Top 40)	30
Italy (FIMI)	9
Netherlands (Dutch Top 40)	7
Netherlands (Single Top 100)	7
Poland (Polish Airplay Top 100)	10
Slovenia (SloTop50)	21
Spain (PROMUSICAE)	15
Sweden (Sverigetopplistan)	7
Switzerland (Schweizer Hitparade)	10
UK Singles (OCC)	22
US Hot Dance/Electronic Songs (Billboard)	23

Chart (2016)	Position
France (SNEP)	165
Hungary (Dance Top 40)	81

== Certifications ==
Region	Certification	Certified units/sales
Australia (ARIA)	4× Platinum	280,000^{‡}
Austria (IFPI Austria)	Gold	15,000^{*}
Belgium (BRMA)	Platinum	20,000^{‡}
Canada (Music Canada)	2× Platinum	160,000^{‡}
Denmark (IFPI Danmark)	3× Platinum	270,000^{‡}
France (SNEP)	Diamond	233,333^{‡}
Germany (BVMI)	2× Platinum	800,000^{‡}
Italy (FIMI)	5× Platinum	250,000^{‡}
Mexico (AMPROFON)	2× Diamond+3× Platinum+Gold	810,000^{‡}
Netherlands (NVPI)	Platinum	30,000^{‡}
New Zealand (RMNZ)	2× Platinum	60,000^{‡}
Norway (IFPI Norway)	5× Platinum	50,000^{‡}
Spain (Promusicae)	3× Platinum	180,000^{‡}
Sweden (GLF)	5× Platinum	200,000^{‡}
Switzerland (IFPI Switzerland)	3× Platinum	90,000^{‡}
United Kingdom (BPI)	3× Platinum	1,800,000^{‡}
United States (RIAA)	Platinum	1,000,000^{‡}
^{*} Sales figures based on certification alone.^{‡} Sales+streaming figures based on certification alone.

== Release history ==
Region	Date	Format	Label
Norway	1 December 2014	Digital download	Ultra; Sony
United Kingdom	3 June 2015	Digital download	Ultra; Sony
