= Conrad Sewell =

Australian singer and songwriter (born 1988)

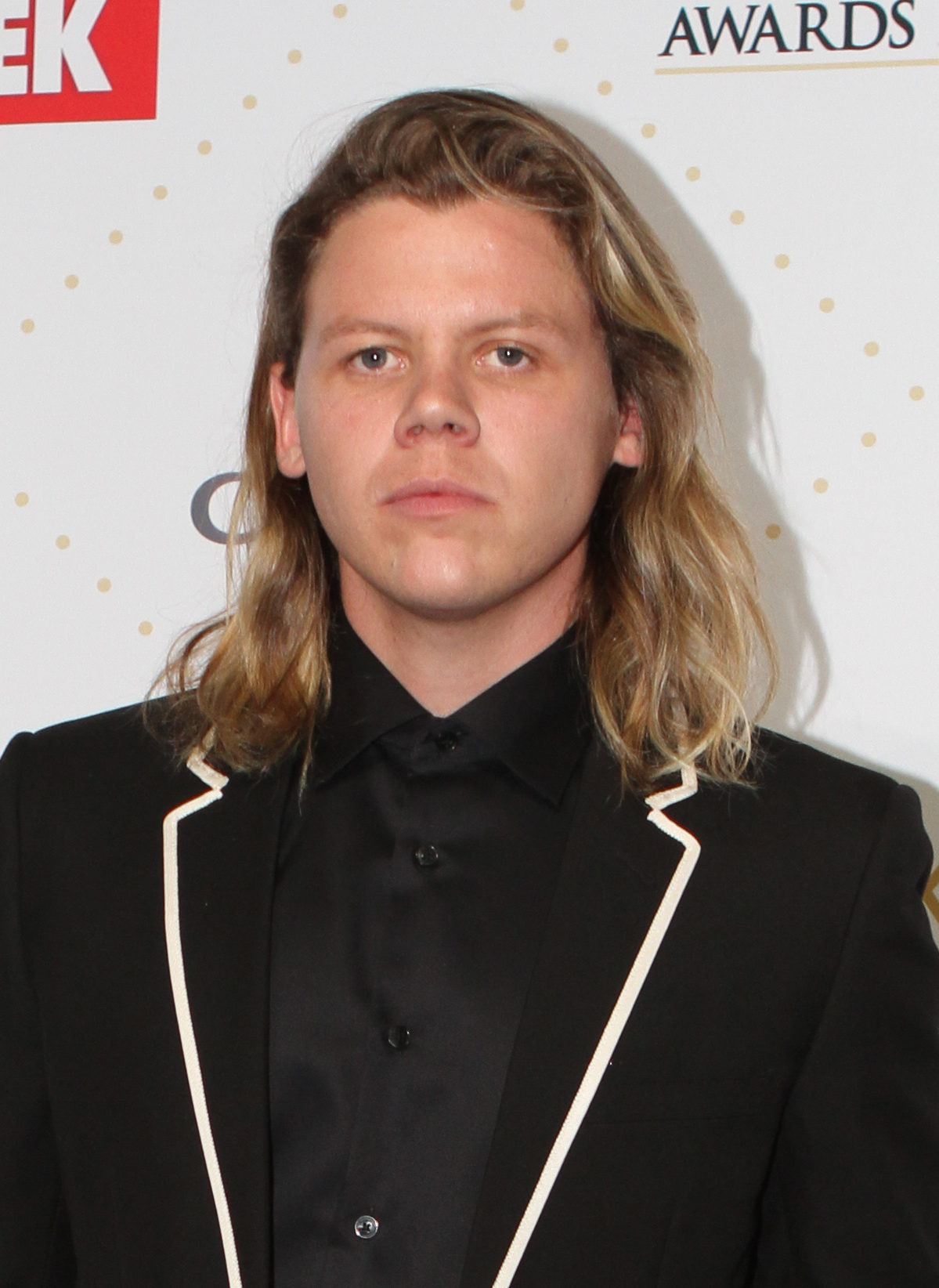
- Sewell in 2016

Background information
- Born: Conrad Ignatius Mario Maximilian Sewell; 31 March 1988 (age 38); Brisbane, Queensland, Australia
- Genres: Pop; soul
- Occupations: Singer; songwriter
- Years active: 2007–present
- Label: Sony Music
- Formerly of: Sons of Midnight
- Website: conradofficial.com

Conrad Ignatius Mario Maximilian Sewell (born 31 March 1988) is an Australian singer and songwriter. He is best known for his vocals on Kygo's single "Firestone" and his number-one single "Start Again".

At the ARIA Music Awards of 2015, he won Song of the Year for "Start Again" and was nominated in two other categories: Breakthrough Artist and Best Pop Release. His debut studio album Life was released in May 2019.

== Early life ==
Growing up in Brisbane, Sewell started pursuing a music career from a young age, sending around demos since he was 8 years old. He later tried his luck with short-lived rock band Sons of Midnight. He is the brother of Australian pop singer Grace. In 2004, Sewell auditioned for season 2 of Australian Idol, but he did not initially pass the audition stage, needing to travel to a different state and re-auditioning before making it into the Top 100 singers for that season. In 2006, he moved to the United Kingdom.

Sewell comes from a family of musicians; his grandparents toured with the Bee Gees and the Gibb Brothers. His sister Grace is a singer best known for her version of the 1963 Lesley Gore song "You Don't Own Me", which hit number one on the ARIA Charts in May 2015. When "Start Again" hit number one on the ARIA Charts in June 2015, Conrad and Grace became the first Australian-born siblings in the history of the charts to hit number one as separate acts.

== Career ==
=== 2007–2017: Sons of Midnight, solo career beginnings, All I Know ===
In 2007, Sewell and guitarist Matthew Copley formed a pop rock group called The Frets, who were later joined by three more members before changing their name to Sons of Midnight. The band released their debut single "The Fire" in 2012, achieving moderate success. The song currently has over 3.3 million plays on Spotify. The band released their debut self-titled album in 2013, but disappeared from the public shortly before the planned release of their second album.

In 2014 Sewell wrote and featured on Kygo's hit, "Firestone". The single was a top five hit across Europe. His debut single "Hold Me Up" was written and produced by Brian Lee, The Euroz and Louis Bell. On 2 March 2015, Sewell announced his opening slot on Ed Sheeran's Australian tour via a video posted on his Facebook page. He joined Sheeran on 13 dates throughout Australia. On 12 June 2015, Live Nation confirmed that Sewell would join Maroon 5 on the Maroon V Tour in September as well as posting several tour dates. Sewell supported Jess Glynne on her "Ain't Got Far to Go" UK tour in October and November 2015. In October, Sewell announced that his debut extended play, All I Know would be released on 13 November 2015. He also posted various Australian and New Zealand tour dates throughout November. In March 2015, he was picked as Elvis Duran's Artist of the Month and was featured on American TV network NBC's Today show hosted by Kathy Lee Gifford and Hoda Kotb and broadcast nationally across the United States where he performed live his single "Start Again". In November 2015, at the ARIA Music Awards of 2015, Sewell won Song of the Year for "Start Again". In February 2016, Sewell released "Remind Me" as the final single from All I Know. The following month, Coca-Cola released a song and video for their new campaign, "Taste the Feeling". It features Sewell's vocals and production from Avicii.

=== 2018–2021: Sony Music Australia and Life ===
In May 2018, Sewell announced he had signed with Sony Music Australia. In a statement, AO, chairman and CEO of Sony Denis Handlin said, "Conrad Sewell is an incredibly talented artist and I am thrilled to welcome him to the Sony Music family. This exciting next phase of his career will see him reach new heights and we are honoured to be a part of it."

On 18 May 2018, Sewell released the Ghosts & Heartaches EP, containing "Come Clean" and "Healing Hands". In February 2019, Sewell announced the release of his debut studio album Life which was released on 17 May 2019 and debuted at number 1 on the ARIA Charts. Sewell had performed the Australian national anthem at the 2019 AFL Grand Final.

=== 2022–present: Precious ===
On 9 September 2022, Sewell released "God Save the Queen"; the first new music from Sewell since 2019. The single described as "high-octane rock and roll, and a riot of energy." That month, he performed as a support act for Irish band The Script on their Australian tour. On 14 October 2022, Sewell released "Make Me a Believer", a proclamation of unwavering devotion from the singer-songwriter. In October 2022, Sewell announced three headline East Coast shows in Sydney, Brisbane, and Melbourne throughout November and December as well as the title of his second studio album, Precious, released in March 2023.

In 2023, Sewell competed as Bouncer on the fifth season of The Masked Singer Australia. He placed third, behind Darren Hayes and Dami Im.

== Personal life ==
Sewell comes from a large Catholic family and was confirmed in 2005, shortly after his success on Australian Idol. Sewell has noted his struggle with drug and alcohol addiction.

== Discography ==
=== Albums ===
Title	Details	Peak chart positions
Title	Details	AUS
Life	Released: 17 May 2019; Label: Sony Music Australia; Formats: CD, digital download, streaming	1
Precious	Released: 3 March 2023; Label: Sony Music Australia; Formats: CD, digital download, streaming	67

=== Extended plays ===
Title	Details	Peak chart positions
Title	Details	AUS
All I Know	Released: 13 November 2015; Label: 300; Formats: CD, digital download	9
Ghosts & Heartaches	Released: 18 May 2018; Label: Sony Music Australia; Formats: Digital download, streaming, CD	— (Note: In Australia, sales of the Ghosts & Heartaches EP counted towards the song "Healing Hands" and therefore could not chart separately.)

=== Singles ===
==== As lead artist ====
Title	Year	Peak chart positions					Certifications	Album
Title	Year	AUS	AUT	FRA	GER	SWE	Certifications	Album
"Hold Me Up"	2015	39	—	—	—	— (Note: "Hold Me Up" did not enter the Swedish Singles Chart, but peaked at number eight on the Swedish Heatseeker chart.)		All I Know
"Start Again"	2015	1	—	—	—	—	ARIA: Platinum	All I Know
"Who You Lovin"	2015	17	—	—	—	—	ARIA: Gold	All I Know
"Remind Me"	2016	22	—	—	—	—	ARIA: Gold	All I Know
"Taste the Feeling" (with Avicii)	2016	—	17	136	53	60		Non-album single
"Healing Hands"	2018	7	—	—	—	—	ARIA: 3× Platinum	Life
"Changing"	2018	91	—	—	—	—		Life
"Love Me Anyway"	2019	—	—	—	—	—		Life
"Life"	2019	— (Note: "Life" did not enter the ARIA Singles Chart, but peaked at number 15 on the ARIA Digital Track Chart.)	—	—	—	—		Life
"Big World"	2019	—	—	—	—	—		Life
"God Save the Queen"	2022	—	—	—	—	—		Precious
"Make Me a Believer"	2022	—	—	—	—	—		Precious
"Caroline"	2022	—	—	—	—	—		Precious
"Rolling Thunder"	2022	—	—	—	—	—		Precious
"Ferris Wheel"	2023	—	—	—	—	—		Precious
"All Life Long"	2024	—	—	—	—	—		Non-album single
"Different Kind of Love"	2024	—	—	—	—	—		Non-album single
"Someone Else's Dime"(with 360)	2025	—	—	—	—	—		
"Walk On"	2025	—	—	—	—	—		
"—" denotes releases that did not chart or were not released in that territory.

==== As featured artist ====
Title	Year	Peak chart positions										Certifications	Album
Title	Year	AUS	AUT	FRA	GER	NL	NOR	SWE	SWI	UK	US	Certifications	Album
"Firestone" (Kygo featuring Conrad Sewell)	2014	10	5	5	3	4	1	2	4	8	92	ARIA: Platinum; BPI: 3× Platinum; BVMI: 2× Platinum; IFPI NOR: 4× Platinum; IFPI AUT: Gold; IFPI SWE: Platinum; RIAA: Platinum	Cloud Nine
"Braver Love" (Arty featuring Conrad Sewell)	2015	—	—	—	—	—	—	—	—	—	—		Glorious
"Little Love" (Kilian & Jo featuring Conrad Sewell)	2015	—	—	—	—	—	—	—	—	—	—		Non-album singles
"Secrets" (Cid featuring Conrad Sewell)	2017	—	—	—	—	—	—	—	—	—	—		Non-album singles
"Sex, Love & Water" (Armin van Buuren featuring Conrad Sewell)	2018	—	—	—	—	93	—	—	—	—	—		Balance
"Who Am I" (Enzo Ingrosso featuring Conrad Sewell)	2019	—	—	—	—	—	—	—	—	—	—		Non-album singles
"Kingdom" (ARTY featuring Conrad Sewell)	2020	—	—	—	—	—	—	—	—	—	—		Non-album singles
"—" denotes releases that did not chart or were not released in that territory.

== Tours ==
Headlining

- All I Know Tour (2015–16)
- Life Tour (2019)
- Headline Tour (2022)
- Bloodline Tour (2026)

== Awards and nominations ==
=== APRA Awards ===
The APRA Awards are held in Australia and New Zealand by the Australasian Performing Right Association to recognise songwriting skills, sales and airplay performance by its members annually.

Year	Nominee / work	Award	Result	Ref.
2019	"Healing Hands"	Pop Work of the Year	Nominated	

=== ARIA Music Awards ===
The ARIA Music Awards is an annual awards ceremony that recognises excellence, innovation, and achievement across all genres of Australian music. Sewell had one win from 4 nominations.

Year	Nominee / work	Award	Result	Ref.
2015	"Start Again"	Best Pop Release	Nominated	
2015	"Start Again"	Breakthrough Artist	Nominated	
2015	"Start Again"	Song of the Year	Won	
2018	"Healing Hands"	Song of the Year	Nominated	

=== Queensland Music Awards ===
The Queensland Music Awards (previously known as Q Song Awards) are annual awards celebrating Queensland, Australia's brightest emerging artists and established legends. They commenced in 2006.

Year	Nominee / work	Award	Result (wins only)	Ref.
2020	Life	Highest Selling Album	Won	
