= Exile Tour =

2013–2014 concert tour by Hurts

- Concert by Hurts
- Exile Tour Poster
- Location: Europe, Asia
- Associated album: Exile
- Start date: February 7, 2013
- End date: August 7, 2014
- No. of shows: 79; 76 in Europe; 3 in Asia

Hurts concert chronology
- Happiness Tour (2010–2012); Exile Tour (2013–2014); Desire Tour (2017-2018)

The Exile Tour is the second concert tour by British band Hurts in support of their second album Exile. On 11 December 2012, Theo Hutchcraft posted an image on Twitter which announced the first 14 dates of the tour. Autumn 2013 dates were published by Hutchcraft on Twitter on 26 August 2013. The tour started on 5 October in Ukraine and will end on 22 November in Luxembourg, with 21 dates in total. In February and March 2014 Hurts took a part in Art on Ice Tour. Hurts was accompanied by the Youth Classics orchestra at the six shows in Zürich in February and March.

== Background ==
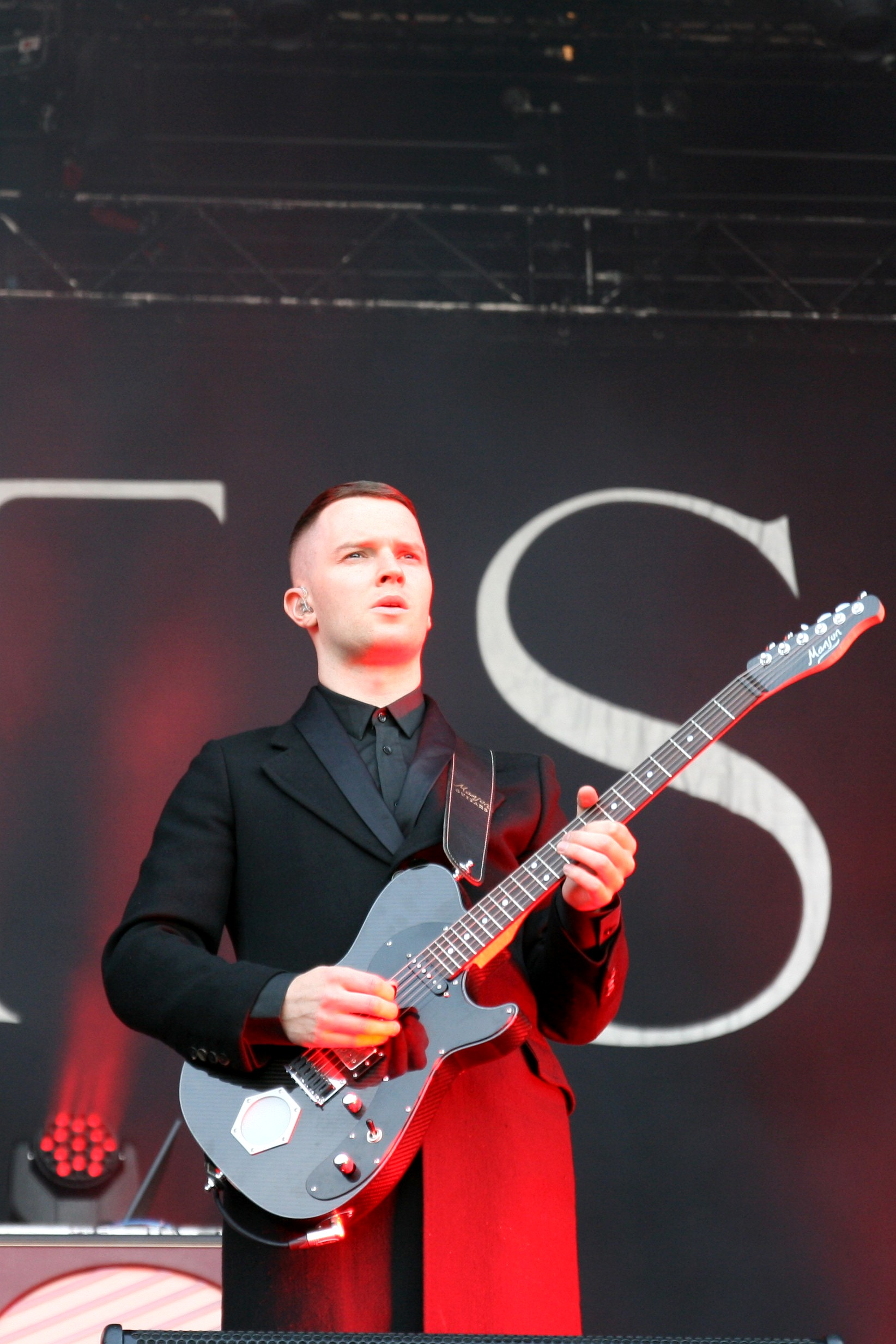
Adam Anderson plays the guitar.

At the beginning of the show, Hutchcraft appears on the scene wearing a hooded parka and leather gloves. He takes the parka off after the first song. As in the previous Happiness Tour, he throws white roses into the crowd. During "The Road", he breaks the microphone stand. Adam Anderson performs most of the songs while sitting at the synthesizer, but during "Exile", "Miracle", "Evelyn", and "The Road", "Mercy", "Help", "Cupid" and acoustic version of "Blood Tears & Gold" he stands up and plays the guitar. For the encore, they perform their song "Stay" at the first leg of tour. The light design team has a trailer with scenery and 20,000 lights for each show. Unlike the previous tour, where dramatically dressed dancers followed the duo on stage, this tour focuses on the performance itself. Dancers appeared on stage at most of the many summer festivals since Rock im Park in Germany on 7 June.

On 25 October Hurts get new stage lighting equipment.

Hurts used red and white confetti at the end of the song called "Help" at their show at Troxy in London, 26 October 2013.

Instruments for performances: synthesizers; guitars "Manson", "Gretsch", "Fender Telecaster", "Fender Stratocaster", "Fender Precision Bass", effects unit "TC Electronic", "Mesa Boogie"; drums "Sonor", "Paiste"; saxophone, clarinet, viola, violins, cello.

== Reception ==
Reviewers unanimously admit there is more drama in the new shows, agreeing that the emotional connection between the band and the crowd is stronger than ever.

== Opening acts ==
- Say Lou Lou (select dates in February, March, November 2013)
- Uniqplan (Warsaw, 20 March 2013)
- Make My Heart Explode (Prague, 28 March 2013)
- Bahroma (Kyiv, 5 October 2013)
- Pawws (UK, 25–26 October 2013)
- Golden Parazyth (Tallinn, 3 November 2013; Riga, 4 November 2013;
  Vilnius, 6 November 2013)
- XXANAXX (Warsaw, 7 November 2013)
- Glasvegas (Germany, 10–15 November 2013)
- Pegasus (Germany, 10–15 November 2013; Bern, 18 November 2013;
  Brussels 20 November 2013; Utrecht, 21 November 2013)

== Setlist ==
The tour's setlist generally consists of half of the songs from Happiness and half from Exile.

7 February – 24 May 2013
1. "Exile"
2. "Miracle"
3. "Wonderful Life"
4. "Silver Lining"
5. "Blind"
6. "Evelyn"
7. "Cupid"
8. "Sunday"
9. "Sandman"
10. "Blood, Tears & Gold"
11. "Unspoken"
12. "Illuminated"
13. "The Road"

Encore:

14. "Somebody to Die For"
15. "Better Than Love"
16. "Stay"

Notes

- "Blood, Tears and Gold" was on the set list but wasn't played 7 February 2013
- "Somebody To Die For" popped into set list since 14 March 2013
- "Somebody To Die For" in acoustic version was played 7 February – 20 March 2013
- "Cupid" was played 7 February – 20 March 2013
- "Sandman" popped into set list since 20 March 2013
7 June – 11 October 2013
1. "Exile"
2. "Miracle"
3. "Wonderful Life"
4. "Somebody to Die For"
5. "Silver Lining"
6. "Evelyn"
7. "Sunday"
8. "Blood, Tears & Gold"
9. "Army of Me" (Björk cover)
10. "Sandman"
11. "Blind"
12. "The Road"
13. "Unspoken"
14. "Illuminated"
15. "Better Than Love"

Encore:

16. "Stay"

Notes

- "Army of Me" (Björk cover) was played since 7 June 2013
- "Silver Lining", "Blood Tears and Gold", "Army Of Me", "Blind",
  "The Road", "Unspoken" were out of set list in selected dates
25 October – 22 November 2013

Intro

1. "Mercy"
2. "Miracle"
3. "Silver Lining"
4. "Wonderful Life"
5. "Somebody to Die For"
6. "Blind"
7. "Evelyn"
8. "Cupid"
9. "Unspoken"
10. "The Crow"
11. "Ohne Dich" (Selig cover, acoustic)
12. "Blood, Tears & Gold" (acoustic)
13. "Exile"
14. "Sandman"
15. "Sunday"
16. "Stay"
17. "Illuminated"
18. "The Road"

Encore:

19. "Better Than Love"
20. "Help"

Notes

- "Ohne Dich" (Selig cover, acoustic) was played in Germany in November 2013
27 February – 13 March 2014
1. "Silver Lining"
2. "Wonderful Life"
3. "Evelyn"
4. "Somebody to Die For"
5. "The Water"
6. "Stay"
7. "Miracle"
14 June – 7 August 2014
1. "Mercy"
2. "Miracle"
3. "Silver Lining"
4. "Wonderful Life"
5. "Somebody to Die For"
6. "Blind"
7. "Evelyn"
8. "Cupid"
9. "Unspoken"
10. "Blood, Tears & Gold" (acoustic)
11. "Exile"
12. "Sandman"
13. "Sunday"
14. "Illuminated"
15. "Stay"

Encore:

16. "Better Than Love"

== Tour dates ==
Hurts on the Exile tour

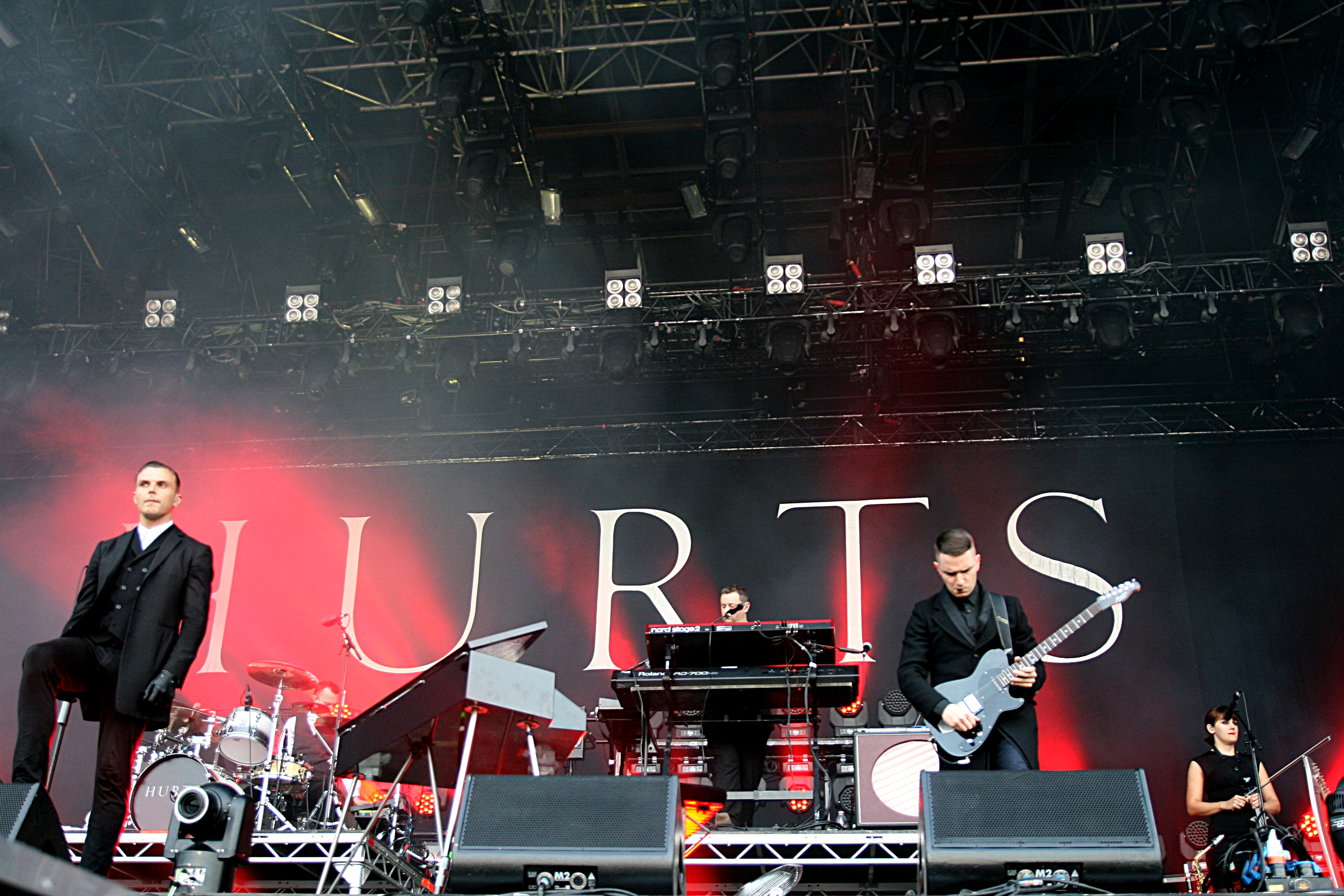
June 13, 2013

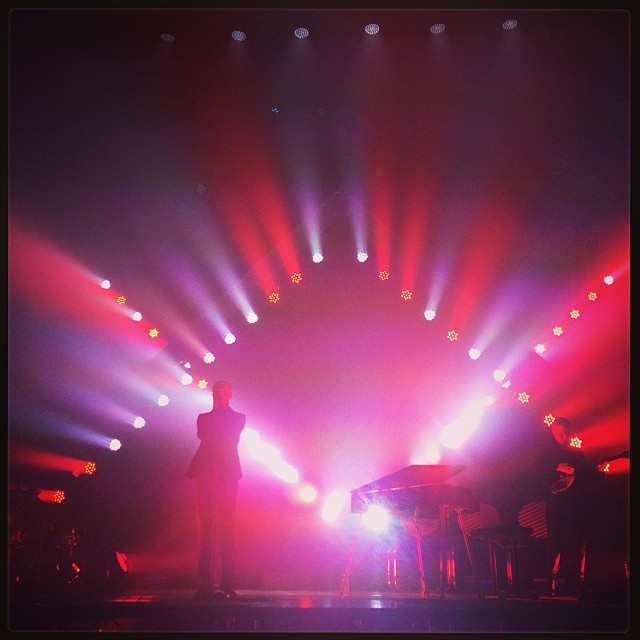
October 26, 2013

Date	City	Country	Venue/Event
Europe, Asia, Leg #1
7 February 2013	London	United Kingdom	Heaven
9 February 2013	Berlin	Germany	Postbahnhof
14 March 2013	Cologne	Germany	Essigfabrik
15 March 2013	Munich	Germany	Theatrefabrik
16 March 2013	Hamburg	Germany	Uebel & Gefährlich
18 March 2013	Stockholm	Sweden	Debaser Medis
20 March 2013	Warsaw	Poland	Palladium
23 March 2013	Zürich	Switzerland	Kaufleuten
25 March 2013	Milan	Italy	Magazzini Generali
27 March 2013	Vienna	Austria	Arena
28 March 2013	Prague	Czech Republic	Lucerna Music Bar
30 March 2013^{[a]}	Amsterdam	Netherlands	Melkweg The Max
1 April 2013	Manchester	United Kingdom	Manchester Academy 2
2 April 2013	Glasgow	United Kingdom	The Garage
19 April 2013	Bratislava	Slovakia	Electronic Beats Festival
25 April 2013	Beijing	China	CAFA
24 May 2013	Hanover	Germany	NDR 2 Plaza Festival
7 June 2013	Nuremberg	Germany	Rock im Park Festival
8 June 2013	Nuremberg	Germany	Rock am Ring Festival
23 June 2013	Vienna	Austria	Danube Island Festival
29 June 2013	Somerset	United Kingdom	Glastonbury Festival
2 July 2013	Minsk	Belarus	MOST Festival
4 July 2013	Sopron	Hungary	VOLT Festival
5 July 2013	Turku	Finland	Ruisrock Festival
6 July 2013	Moscow	Russia	Subbotnik Festival
12 July 2013	Dnipropetrovsk	Ukraine	The Best City.ua Festival
14 July 2013	Kinross	United Kingdom	T In The Park Festival
18 July 2013	Benicàssim	Spain	FIB Festival
20 July 2013	Bern	Switzerland	Gurtenfestival
21 July 2013	London	United Kingdom	Lovebox Festival
26 July 2013	Niigata	Japan	Fuji Rock Festival
28 July 2013	Ansan	Korea	Jisan Valley Rock Festival
2 August 2013	Minsk	Belarus	Stalin Line
15 August 2013	Hasselt	Belgium	Pukkelpop Festival
16 August 2013	Biddinghuizen	Netherlands	Lowlands Festival
17 August 2013	Sankt Pölten	Austria	FM4 Frequency Festival
31 August 2013	County Laois	Ireland	Electric Picnic Festival
7 September 2013	Istanbul	Turkey	Rock'n Coke Festival
21 September 2013	Poznań	Poland	Lech brewery
Leg #2
5 October 2013	Kyiv	Ukraine	Palace of Sports
7 October 2013	Odesa	Ukraine	Palace of Sports
9 October 2013	Kharkiv	Ukraine	Palace of Sports
11 October 2013	Bucharest	Romania	Romexpo
25 October 2013	Manchester	United Kingdom	The O2 Apollo Manchester
26 October 2013	London	United Kingdom	Troxy
2 November 2013	Helsinki	Finland	Helsinki Ice Hall
3 November 2013	Tallinn	Estonia	Saku Arena
4 November 2013	Riga	Latvia	Arena Riga
6 November 2013	Vilnius	Lithuania	Siemens Arena
7 November 2013	Warsaw	Poland	Torwar Hall
8 November 2013	Prague	Czech Republic	Incheba Hall
10 November 2013	Berlin	Germany	Velodrom
11 November 2013	Munich	Germany	Zenith
13 November 2013	Düsseldorf	Germany	Mitsubishi Electric Halle
14 November 2013	Frankfurt	Germany	Jahrhunderthalle
15 November 2013	Hamburg	Germany	Sporthalle
17 November 2013	Vienna	Austria	Gasometer
18 November 2013	Bern	Switzerland	Festhalle
20 November 2013	Brussels	Belgium	AB
21 November 2013	Utrecht	Netherlands	Vredenburg
22 November 2013	Luxembourg	Luxembourg	Sonic Visions Festival
Leg #3
27 February 2014^{[b]}	Zurich	Switzerland	Hallenstadion
28 February 2014^{[b]}	Zurich	Switzerland	Hallenstadion
1 March 2014^{[b]}	Zurich	Switzerland	Hallenstadion
2 March 2014^{[b]}	Zurich	Switzerland	Hallenstadion
4 March 2014^{[b]}	Lausanne	Switzerland	CIG de Malley
5 March 2014^{[b]}	Lausanne	Switzerland	CIG de Malley
7 March 2014^{[b]}	Davos	Switzerland	Vaillant Arena
8 March 2014^{[b]}	Davos	Switzerland	Vaillant Arena
11 March 2014^{[b]}	Helsinki	Finland	Hartwall Areena
13 March 2014^{[b]}	Stockholm	Sweden	Ericsson Globe Arena
Leg #4
14 June 2014	Warsaw	Poland	Orange Warsaw Festival
5 July 2014	Sopron	Hungary	VOLT Festival
11 July 2014	Tallinn	Estonia	Õllesummer Festival
13 July 2014	Novi Sad	Serbia	Exit Festival
18 July 2014	Pori	Finland	Pori Jazz Festival
7 August 2014	Schaffhausen	Switzerland	Stars in Town Festival

Notes
^{a} The show in Amsterdam was originally scheduled at the Old Hall, but it was moved to The Max.
^{b} This performance is a part of Art on Ice Tour.

Cancelled dates

18 October 2013	Glasgow, United Kingdom	O2 Academy Glasgow	Performance was cancelled before going on sale.
28 October 2013	Copenhagen, Denmark	Pumpehuset	Performance in Scandinavia was cancelled due to unforeseen circumstances.
29 October 2013	Oslo, Norway	Rockefeller Music Hall	Performance in Scandinavia was cancelled due to unforeseen circumstances.
31 October 2013	Malmö, Sweden	KB	Performance in Scandinavia was cancelled due to unforeseen circumstances.
27 July 2014	Schönwalde-Glien, Germany	Greenville Festival	The festival was canceled due to low ticket sales.

== Personnel ==
Main

- Matt Vines, Neil Reeves – management/tour management
- Rick Smith – production management
- Rob Sinclair - lighting and stage design
- Matt Arthur – lighting director
- Chris Freeman – backline
- Lee Birchall – backline
- Adam Pendse – FOH engineer
- Paul Roberts – choreographer
- Caroline Royce, Emily Rumbles – dancers

Band

=== Hurts ===
- Theo Hutchcraft – vocals
- Adam Anderson – keyboards, guitar

=== Musicians ===
- Lael Goldberg – bass, backing vocals
- Pete Watson – keyboards, piano, backing vocals
- Paul Walsham – drums
- Amy May – saxophone, clarinet, viola, backing vocals
- Paloma Deike, Penny Anscow – violin, backing vocals
- Rhian Porter – cello
