= List of awards and nominations received by Hurts =

Hurts awards and nominations
Awards and nominations
Award	Wins	Nominations
MTV Europe Music Awards	0	1
MTV Germany Movie Awards	1	1
Echo Awards	1	2
(Shockwaves) NME Awards	2	8
UK Music Video Awards	0	6
Musikexpress Style Award	1	1
Bambi Awards	1	1
The Bizarre Awards	1	1
Xfm New Music Awards	0	1
Fonogram Awards	1	1
Swiss Music Awards	0	1
Ultra-Music Awards	1	1
DMA	0	1
Q Awards	0	1

Totals (Note: Certain award groups do not simply award one winner. They acknowledge several different recipients, have runners-up, and have third place. Since this is a specific recognition and is different from losing an award, runner-up mentions are considered wins in this award tally. For simplification and to avoid errors, each award in this list has been presumed to have had a prior nomination.)
- Wins: 12
- Nominations: 34

Hurts has received one MTV Europe Music Awards nominations. Hurts has received Germany Musikexpress Style Award (October 18, 2010) in the Best Performer International category – it was the first award.

== Awards and nominations ==
=== BT Digital Music Awards ===
Year	Nominee / work	Award	Result
2011	Don’t Let Go: An Interactive Novel on Spotify	Best Artist Promotion	Nominated

=== Bambi Awards ===
Year	Nominee / work	Award	Result
2010	Themselves	Shooting-Star	Won

=== Berlin Music Video Awards ===
Year	Nominee / work	Award	Result
2016	"Lights"	Best Cinematography	Won
2018	"Beautiful Ones"	Best Narrative	Nominated

=== Camerimage ===
Year	Nominee / work	Award	Result	Ref.
2017	"Beautiful Ones"	Best Music Video	Nominated	

=== ECHO Awards ===
Year	Nominee / work	Award	Result
2011	Themselves	Best International Newcomer	Won
2011	Themselves	Best International Band	Nominated

=== Fonogram Awards ===
Year	Nominee / work	Award	Result	Ref.
2011	Happiness	Best International Album	Won	
2014	Exile	Alternative Music Album of the Year	Nominated	
2026	"Wonderful Life '25" (with Purple Disco Machine)	Foreign Electronic Recording of the Year	Nominated	

=== Gay Music Chart Awards ===
Year	Nominee / work	Award	Result	Ref.
2017	"Beautiful Ones"	Best Drag Queen Music Video	Nominated	

=== Ibiza Music Video Festival ===
Year	Nominee / work	Award	Result
2016	"Lights"	Best DOP	Won

=== MTV Germany Movie Awards ===
Year	Nominee / work	Award	Result
2011	Stay (film Kokowääh)	Best Soundtrack for German Film	Won

=== MTV Europe Music Awards ===
Year	Nominee / work	Award	Result
2010	Themselves	Best Push Act	Nominated

=== MVPA Awards ===
Year	Nominee / work	Award	Result
2013	"Miracle"	Best International Video	Nominated

=== Musikexpress Style Award ===
Year	Nominee / work	Award	Result
18.10.2010	Themselves	Best Performer International	Won

=== NME Awards ===
Year	Nominee / work	Award	Result
2011	Themselves	Best New Band	Won
2011	Themselves	Best Band Blog or Twitter	Nominated
2012	Sunday	Best Video	Won
2012	Sunday	Best Track	Nominated
2012	Themselves	Best Band Blog or Twitter	Nominated
2012	Themselves	Most Dedicated Fans	Nominated
2014	Themselves	Most Dedicated Fans	Nominated
2014	Themselves	Best Band Blog or Twitter	Nominated
2016	Themselves	Best Fan Community	Nominated

=== Popjustice £20 Music Prize ===
Year	Nominee / work	Award	Result
2010	Wonderful Life	Best British Pop Single	Nominated
2010	Stay	Best British Pop Single	Nominated

=== Q Awards ===
Year	Nominee / work	Award	Result
2011	Wonderful Life	Best Video	Nominated

=== RTHK International Pop Poll Awards ===
Year	Nominee / work	Award	Result	Ref.
2011	Themselves	Top New Act	Silver	

=== Swiss Music Awards ===
Year	Nominee / work	Award	Result
2011	Themselves	Best Breaking Act International	Nominated

=== UK Music Video Awards ===
Year	Nominee / work	Award	Result
2010	Better Than Love	Best Pop Video	Nominated
2013	Exile	Best Music AD	Nominated
2016	Lights	Best Pop Video - UK	Nominated
2016	Lights	Best Styling in a Video	Nominated
2016	Lights	Best Cinematography	Nominated
2016	Lights	Best Editing	Nominated

=== Ultra-Music Awards ===
Year	Nominee / work	Award	Result
2011	Wonderful Life	Best International Song of the Year	Won

=== Virgin Media Music Awards ===
Year	Nominee / work	Award	Result
2011	Themselves	Best Group	Won

=== Xfm New Music Awards ===
Year	Nominee / work	Award	Result
2011	Happiness	Best British Debut Album of 2010	Nominated

=== Žebřík Music Awards ===
Year	Nominee / work	Award	Result	Ref.
2010	Themselves	Best International Discovery	Won	

== Miscellaneous awards and honours ==
Year	Award/honor	Nominator
2009	Sound of 2010 poll (#4)	BBC
2010	50 best new bands of 2010 (#18)	A-ONE
2010	Performer of the year (#2)	Moskva.FM
2010	Band of the year (#3)	Love Radio Awards
2010	18 NME's new music tips for 2010 (#7)	NME
2010	50 best new bands of 2010 (#14)	NME
2010	Debut of the year (#1)	Look at Me
2010	Best new act to properly get going in 2010 (readers' choice) #1)	Popjustice
2011	Best performance of Glastonbury Festival 2011 (#1)	NME
2011	Best performance at T in the Park 2011 (#1)	NME
2011	Top albums of the last year (readers' Top 20) (#1)	NME
2011	Bands of summer 2011 (readers' Top 20) (#1)	NME
2011	Best Albums Of The Past 15 Years (readers' choice) (#)	NME
