= Adam Anderson (composer) =

English musician, singer, composer, and record producer (born 1984)

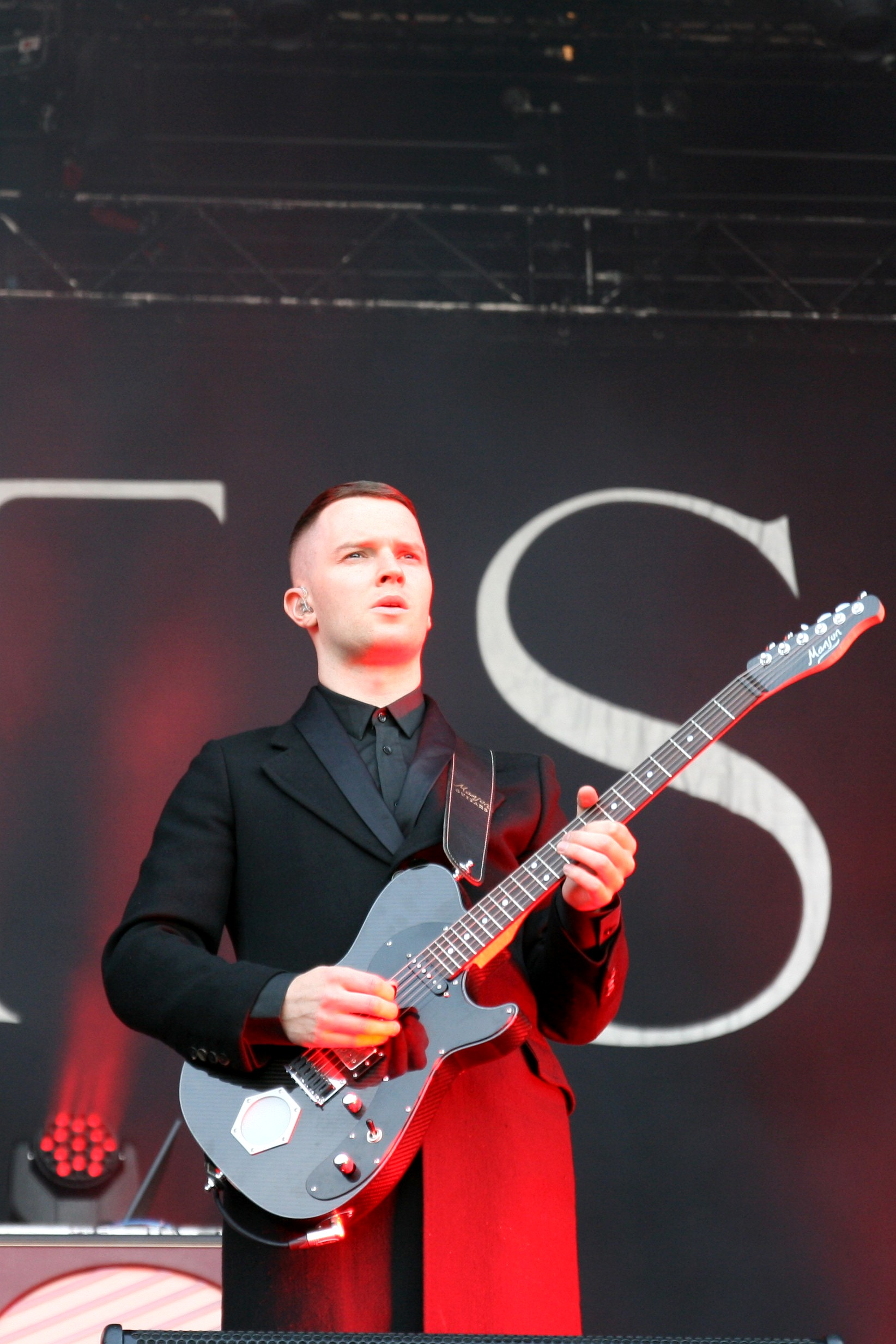
- Anderson performing with Hurts at Rock im Park-Festival in June 2013

Background information
- Born: 14 May 1984 (age 42); Manchester, England
- Genres: Synthpop; electropop; new wave; soft rock
- Occupations: Musician; singer; composer; record producer
- Instruments: Synthesizer; keyboards; guitar; vocals
- Years active: 2004–present
- Label: RCA
- Member of: Hurts

Adam Anderson (born 14 May 1984) is an English musician, singer, composer, and record producer. He is best known as the instrumentalist and co-founder of the synth-pop duo Hurts, alongside lead vocalist Theo Hutchcraft. Since forming in 2009, Hurts have released five studio albums and achieved widespread success across Europe with a distinctive blend of melancholic pop, electronic music, and stylised visual aesthetics. Anderson is recognised for his cinematic production style, introspective songwriting, and openness regarding mental health challenges.

== Early life and education ==
Adam Anderson was born in Manchester, England on 14 May 1984. Raised in the city's northern suburbs, he developed a keen interest in music from a young age, learning piano and guitar as a teenager. He has cited classical music, post-punk, and electronic pioneers such as Depeche Mode, Kraftwerk, and Jean-Michel Jarre among his early influences. Though relatively private about his upbringing, Anderson has spoken publicly about facing mental health challenges from adolescence, including anxiety, depression, and health anxiety, which later shaped both his musical output and personal journey.

== Career ==
=== 2005–2009: Bureau and Daggers ===
Anderson met Theo Hutchcraft in November 2004 outside the nightclub 42nd Street in Manchester. After bonding over shared musical interests, the pair formed the band Bureau in early 2006. Bureau released one double A-side single, "After Midnight"/"Dollhouse", before disbanding in 2007.

Shortly afterward, Anderson and Hutchcraft regrouped as Daggers, exploring a more electronic-driven pop sound. Daggers garnered critical interest and worked with producers such as Biff Stannard and Richard X, but after a poorly received industry showcase in 2008, Anderson and Hutchcraft reassessed their direction. A ballad titled "Unspoken" marked a turning point in their sound, leading to the dissolution of Daggers and the eventual formation of Hurts.

=== 2009–2020: success with Hurts ===
In 2009, Anderson and Hutchcraft formed Hurts, a duo blending melancholic synth-pop with high-concept visuals and a minimalist, suited aesthetic. Their self-produced video for Wonderful Life quickly went viral, leading to a major label deal with RCA Records.

Hurts' debut album, Happiness (2010), was the fastest-selling debut by a band that year in the UK and achieved multi-platinum status across Europe. Anderson co-wrote and produced many of the album's tracks, including Stay, Better Than Love, and Blood, Tears & Gold. The album's success was bolstered by collaborations with artists like Kylie Minogue, who recorded vocals for Devotion.

Subsequent albums — Exile (2013), Surrender (2015), Desire (2017), and Faith (2020) — continued the band's fusion of emotional intensity, atmospheric production, and European pop sensibilities. Anderson's instrumentation and orchestration have been widely praised for their cinematic scope and attention to detail. The duo toured extensively, building a large fanbase in countries such as Germany, Russia, Finland, and Poland, where they became headline acts.

=== 2020–present: hiatus and personal projects ===
Following the release of Faith in 2020, the COVID-19 pandemic halted the band's planned world tour. Both members took time away from the spotlight, with Anderson focusing on his mental health and developing interests in classical composition and instrumental music.

In May 2025, Hurts announced a 15th anniversary tour for Happiness. However, Anderson confirmed via Instagram that he would not be taking part in the shows, choosing instead to prioritise his well-being and recovery from longstanding mental health issues. He was publicly supported by Hutchcraft and the broader Hurts fan community.

== Personal life ==
Anderson is known for his vintage-inspired fashion sense, often favouring sharp tailoring, muted colour palettes, and minimalist silhouettes reminiscent of mid-20th century European cinema. His sartorial style has drawn media attention, and he has been interviewed about his aesthetic by fashion outlets such as GQ, where he discussed the importance of dressing with intention and how his personal style complements the visual identity of Hurts.

He also has a brother who is a pianist, and the two share a strong musical connection. Their early exposure to classical music played a formative role in Anderson's development as a multi-instrumentalist and composer.

== Musical style and influences ==
Anderson's musical approach is heavily influenced by 1980s synth-pop, classical romanticism, minimalism, and film scores. As the primary arranger and producer in Hurts, he has played a key role in shaping the band's signature blend of grand, emotive pop with sparse, cinematic arrangements.

Influences cited include Vangelis, Tears for Fears, David Bowie, Pet Shop Boys, Prince, Joy Division, and Ennio Morricone. Anderson's production style is characterised by dramatic dynamics, rich layering, and an atmospheric use of silence and space.
