= Ready to Go =

Ready to Go may refer to:

== Music ==
- Ready to Go!, a 2007 album by Melody
- Ready to Go, a 2004 album by Bang Tango
- "Ready to Go" (Hurts song), 2017
- "Ready to Go" (Limp Bizkit song), 2013
- "Ready to Go" (Republica song), 1996
- "Ready to Go (Get Me Out of My Mind)", a 2011 song by Panic! at the Disco
- "Ready 2 Go", a 2011 song by Martin Solveig
- "Ready to Go", a 2016 song by Aruna
- "Ready to Go", a 2022 song by Yam Haus which represented Minnesota in the American Song Contest

== Other ==
- "Ready to Go", a prepaid mobile telephone service of Vodafone Ireland
