= Somebody to Die For =

Single by Hurts

from the album Exile
- Released: 21 July 2013
- Recorded: 2012
- Studio: Pellerin (Gothenburg, Sweden)
- Length: 4:35
- Label: Major Label; Sony; RCA
- Songwriter: Hurts
- Producers: Hurts; Jonas Quant; Dan Grech-Marguerat

Hurts singles chronology
"Blind" (2013)	"Somebody to Die For" (2013)	"Under Control" (2013)

Music video
- "Hurts - Somebody to Die For" on YouTube

"Somebody to Die For" is the third single by English musical duo Hurts from their second studio album Exile, released on 21 July 2013. The song is co-produced with Dan Grech-Marguerat (Lana Del Rey, Moby). Jonas Quant produced the track for the single release.

== Live performances ==
The duo premiered the track during a special live session at Spotify in January 2013 and on 17 May 2013 in an acoustic session for The Sun's Biz Sessions.

== Music video ==
The music video was directed by Frank Borin, who also directed the duo's second version of "Miracle" video in 2013. Visual effects were created by GloriaFX at Digital Ukraine. It was filmed at the Salvation Mountain in the desert near Slab City just several miles from the Salton Sea in California.

== Formats and track listing ==
- Digital EP
1. "Somebody to Die For" (Radio Edit) – 3:20
2. "Somebody to Die For" (Unplugged) – 3:27
3. "Somebody to Die For" (Franz Novotny Remix) – 6:33
4. "Exile" (Freemasons Club Mix) – 7:11
- German EP
1. "Somebody to Die For" (Radio Edit) – 3:20
2. "Ohne Dich" – 4:31
3. "Somebody to Die For" (Unplugged) – 3:27
4. "Somebody to Die For" (Franz Novotny Remix) – 6:33
5. "Exile" (Freemasons Club Mix) – 7:11
6. "Somebody to Die For" (Music Video) – 3:50

== Personnel ==
- Hurts – keyboards, lyrics, music, programming, production
- Jonas Quant – co-producer, single version
- Dan Grech-Marguerat – engineer, producer
- Jakob Hermann – engineering
- Duncan Fuller – assistant engineering
- Pete Watson – piano
- Paul Walsham – drums
- Wil Malone – conductor, performance arranger
- Boguslaw Kostecki, Cathy Thompson, Chris Tombling, Dermot Crehan, Emil Chakalov, Emlyn Singleton, Gaby Lester, Jonathan Rees, Julian Leaper, Liz Edwards, Maciej Rakowski, Mark Berrow, Patrick Kiernan, Perry Montague-Mason, Peter Hanson, Rita Manning, Tom Pigott-Smith, Warren Zielinski – violin
- Andy Parker, Bruce White, Garfield Jackson, Rachel Stephanie Bolt, Steve Wright, Vicci Wardman – viola
- Allen Walley, Mary Scully, Steve Mair – double bass

== Charts ==
Chart (2013)	Peak position
Belgium (Ultratip Bubbling Under Flanders)	85
Austria (Ö3 Austria Top 40)	57
Switzerland (Schweizer Hitparade)	62
Germany (GfK)	46

== Release history ==
Country	Date	Format(s)
Belgium	19 July 2013	Digital download
Netherlands	19 July 2013	Digital download
Finland	19 July 2013	Digital download
Denmark	19 July 2013	Digital download
Sweden	19 July 2013	Digital download
Norway	19 July 2013	Digital download
Italy	19 July 2013	Digital download
Portugal	19 July 2013	Digital download
Russia	19 July 2013	Digital download
Philippines	19 July 2013	Digital download
Singapore	19 July 2013	Digital download
Australia	19 July 2013	Digital download
Brazil	19 July 2013	Digital download
United Kingdom	21 July 2013	Digital download
Germany	30 August 2013	Digital download; CD
