= Pop Farm =

- Industry: Music
- Founded: 2013
- Headquarters: Moscow, Russia
- Products: Concerts, festivals

Pop Farm is a Russian concert agency. It was founded in 2013 in Moscow. Its main projects include Subbotnik Festival (an annual musical festival, held in Gorky Park), the first ever Russian tour of The Offspring, concerts of Imagine Dragons, The xx, Miles Kane, Warpaint, Cut Copy, Smashing Pumpkins, etc.

== History ==
Company was founded in 2013.

On 6 July, Subbotnik Festival was held in Gorky Park. It was organized by the concert agency Pop Farm and corporation PMI together with Gorky Park.

The first ever Russian tour of American band The Offspring started on 25 October.
