= Ready to Go (Hurts song) =

Single by Hurts

from the album Desire
- Released: 1 September 2017
- Recorded: 2017
- Length: 2:45
- Label: Sony
- Songwriters: Theo Hutchcraft; Adam Anderson; David Sneddon
- Producer: Hurts

Hurts singles chronology
"Beautiful Ones" (2017)	"Ready to Go" (2017)	"Chaperone" (2017)

Music video
- "Ready to Go" on YouTube

"Ready to Go" is a song by English musical duo Hurts from their fourth studio album, Desire (2017). It was released on 1 September 2017 as the second single from the album. An accompanying music video premiered on the same day.

== Background and release ==
The song was officially announced on 29 August 2017 through a post on the duo's official Facebook page containing the artwork cover for the single and the release date. Two days later, on 1 September, the song was released as a pre-order track on iTunes and was also made available as a single on several streaming services, including Spotify.

== Composition and lyrical interpretation ==
"Ready to Go" was written by Theo Hutchcraft, Adam Anderson and Scottish singer-songwriter David Sneddon. According to Theo himself, "the song is about living life to the fullest". He also described it as being the "lighter side" of the duo's songwriting, calling it a "standalone moment" from their upcoming album Desire.

== Music video ==
The music video for the song was directed by Thomas James. It was shot in two days at Horwich in Bolton, Greater Manchester. The video required 26 cast members, one horse, three locations, one caravan, 30 live butterflies and several stunts. It premiered on 1 September 2017. In the video, Hutchcraft plays a grieving man who breaks into dance at his lover's funeral, portrayed by French-English actress Poppy Corby-Tuech. The dance routine was choreographed by Alexandra Green.

Hutchcraft says the video "tells a story of passion, grief and the internal struggle that a lot of men face when dealing with their emotions in public", something that it's a common issue in the North of England, where the video was filmed.

== Credits and personnel ==
Credits adapted from Tidal.

- Theo Hutchcraft – songwriting, production, vocals
- Adam Anderson – songwriting, production
- David Sneddon – songwriting
- Lael Goldberg - additional production
- Joe Kearns – engineering
- Matty Green – mixing engineering

== Charts ==
Chart (2017)	Peak position
Belarus Airplay (Eurofest)	10
Croatia (HRT)	77
Czech Republic Airplay (ČNS IFPI)	12
Poland Airplay (ZPAV)	5
Slovakia Airplay (ČNS IFPI)	85

== Release history ==
Region	Date	Format	Label	Ref.
United Kingdom	1 September 2017	Digital download; streaming	Sony	
