= Beautiful Ones (Hurts song) =

Single by Hurts

from the album Desire
- Released: 21 April 2017
- Genre: Power pop
- Length: 3:01
- Label: Sony
- Songwriter(s): Theo Hutchcraft; Adam Anderson; David Sneddon
- Producer(s): Hurts

Hurts singles chronology
| "Wish" (2015) | "Beautiful Ones" (2017) | "Ready to Go" (2017) |

Music video
- "Beautiful Ones" on YouTube

"Beautiful Ones" is a song by English synth-pop duo Hurts from their fourth studio album, Desire (2017). It was released on 21 April 2017 as the lead single from the album, along with an accompanying music video.

== Background and release ==
On 20 April 2017, Hurts shared a small clip on their official Facebook page, announcing something to come out on the next day, which turned out to be the release of their new single "Beautiful Ones". The song was released on 21 April through several digital retailers, including iTunes. On 7 July, an acoustic version of the song was released.

== Composition and lyrical interpretation ==
"Beautiful Ones" features composition by Hurts' members Theo Hutchcraft and Adam Anderson, along with David Sneddon. It is a power pop song, loaded with classic rock's guitar solo crescendos. The song is described by the duo as a "celebration of individuality".

== Critical reception ==
The song received generally positive reviews from music critics. Aaron Powell of tmrw magazine said the song is "sonically akin to their previous work", calling it "strong, well informed, catchy but also dark in places". Writing for Paper magazine, Michael Cuby described the single as a "bold song about unapologetically being yourself even in times of resistance and adversity".

== Music video ==
The music video for "Beautiful Ones" was also released on 21 April 2017. It was directed by Tim Mattia and filmed in Kyiv, Ukraine. The video features reverse chronology and tells the story of a man, portrayed by vocalist Hutchcraft, being chased down and assaulted for being dressed as a woman in a nightclub. After getting stripped down in the middle of the street by his assaulters, he follows them by car and runs over them. The duo described the video as a "colourful celebration of gender fluidity" and it deals with themes of "hate, love, brutality and beauty" that are explored throughout the piece, which is rooted in both intrigue and empathy.

=== Reception ===
The video was well received by the LGBTQ community. Lewis Corner from Gay Times magazine said the video is "one of the most powerful visuals they have created so far". Michael Cuby of Paper praised the importance that the video brings, saying: "California is the only state that has banned the use of gay or trans 'panic defenses', which allow perpetrators of assault or murder against members of the LGBTQ community to get away with their crimes by claiming that a victim's sexual or gender identity caused them to act out in a temporary fit of insanity." He also noted how the fact that one of the attackers was earlier rejected by the victim makes the message in the video "even darker".

== Track listings ==
Digital download

| No. | Title | Length |
|---|---|---|
| 1. | "Beautiful Ones" | 3:01 |

Digital download – acoustic version

| No. | Title | Length |
|---|---|---|
| 1. | "Beautiful Ones" (acoustic) | 3:21 |

== Credits and personnel ==
Credits adapted from Tidal.

- Theo Hutchcraft – songwriting, production, vocals
- Adam Anderson – songwriting, production
- David Sneddon – songwriting
- Joe Kearns – engineer
- Matty Green – mixing engineer

== Charts ==
| Chart (2017) | Peak position |
|---|---|
| Finland Download (Latauslista) | 21 |

== Release history ==
| Region | Date | Format | Version | Label | Refs |
|---|---|---|---|---|---|
| United Kingdom | 21 April 2017 | Digital download; streaming | Original | Sony | |
| United Kingdom | 7 July 2017 | Digital download; streaming | Acoustic | Sony | |
