= Surrender (Hurts album) =

2015 studio album

Studio album by Hurts
- Released: 9 October 2015
- Genre: Synth-pop
- Length: 33:20
- Label: Columbia
- Producers: Martin Forslund; Hurts; Mathieu Jomphe; Stuart Price; Jonas Quant; Ariel Rechtshaid

Hurts chronology
Exile (2013)	Surrender (2015)	Desire (2017)

Singles from Surrender
- 1. "Some Kind of Heaven" Released: 28 May 2015; 2. "Rolling Stone" Released: 17 July 2015; 3. "Lights" Released: 14 August 2015; 4. "Slow" Released: 11 September 2015; 5. "Wish" Released: 7 October 2015

Surrender is the third studio album by English synth-pop duo Hurts. It was released on 9 October 2015 by Columbia Records. The album spawned the singles "Some Kind of Heaven", "Rolling Stone", "Lights", "Slow", and "Wish". Surrender debuted at number 12 on the UK Albums Chart, selling 5,636 copies in its first week.

== Reception ==
Professional ratings
Aggregate scores
Source	Rating
Metacritic	61/100
Review scores
Source	Rating
AllMusic	4/5 stars
Clash	4/10
DIY	4/5 stars
Drowned in Sound	4/10
The Guardian	2/5 stars
musicOMH	2.5/5 stars
NME	4/5
PopMatters	7/10 stars
Q	3/5 stars

Rupert Howe of Q wrote that "[Adam] Anderson's baroque arrangements make the Pet Shop Boys sound understated, but he can write a chorus and when all the elements come together, as on the sweeping, gospel-tinged 'Some Kind of Heaven', 'Why''s lush '80s disco or the OMD-like 'Slow', the results take on a stirring urgency."

== Track listing ==
No.	Title	Writer(s)	Producer(s)	Length
1.	"Surrender"	Theo Hutchcraft; Adam Anderson	Hurts	1:18
2.	"Some Kind of Heaven"	Hutchcraft; Anderson; Jonas Quant	Quant	3:18
3.	"Why"	Hutchcraft; Anderson; Quant	Quant	3:27
4.	"Nothing Will Be Bigger than Us"	Hutchcraft; Anderson; Stuart Price; Jörgen Elofsson	Price; Quant	4:02
5.	"Rolling Stone"	Hutchcraft; Anderson; Quant	Quant	3:41
6.	"Lights"	Hutchcraft; Anderson; Ariel Rechtshaid; Nick Hodgson	Rechtshaid	3:29
7.	"Slow"	Hutchcraft; Anderson; Mathieu Jomphe	Billboard; Quant	3:29
8.	"Kaleidoscope"	Hutchcraft; Anderson	Price	3:04
9.	"Wings"	Hutchcraft; Anderson; Quant	Quant	3:45
10.	"Wish"	Hutchcraft; Anderson; David Sneddon; James Bauer-Mein	Hurts	3:31

Deluxe edition bonus tracks
No.	Title	Writer(s)	Producer(s)	Length
11.	"Perfect Timing"	Hutchcraft; Anderson; Scott Hoffman	Hurts	3:04
12.	"Weight of the World"	Hutchcraft; Anderson; Linda Perry	Quant	3:46
13.	"Policewoman"	Hutchcraft; Anderson; Martin Forslund	Hurts; Forslund	4:45

Japanese edition bonus tracks
No.	Title	Writer(s)	Producer(s)	Length
14.	"S.O.S."	Hutchcraft; Anderson; Hoffman		3:38
15.	"Some Kind of Heaven" (Thin White Duke Remix)	Hutchcraft; Anderson; Quant	Quant; Thin White Duke^{[a]}	5:38

Notes

- ^{^a} signifies a remixer

== Personnel ==
Credits adapted from the liner notes of the deluxe edition of Surrender.

Hurts

- Hurts – production (tracks 1, 10, 11, 13)
- Theo Hutchcraft – vocals (all tracks); programming (tracks 1–5, 7–13)
- Adam Anderson – guitar, keyboards (tracks 1–5, 8–13); programming (tracks 1–5, 7–13); synthesiser (tracks 1–6, 8–13)

Additional personnel

- Malin Abrahamsson – mixing engineering (tracks 1, 2, 9, 13)
- Ken Berglund – engineering (tracks 2, 9)
- Eric Boulanger – mastering engineering (tracks 1, 3–13)
- Martin Forslund – engineering (tracks 2–5, 7, 9, 12, 13); production (track 13)
- Lael Goldberg – bass guitar (tracks 8, 11)
- Jennifer Götvall – mixing engineering (tracks 1, 2, 9, 13)
- Matty Green – mixing engineering (tracks 1, 2, 9, 13)
- Mathieu Jomphe – production, programming (track 7)
- Jon von Letcher – guitar, programming (track 2)
- Paulo Mendonça – bass guitar, guitar (track 3)
- Stuart Price – guitar, keyboards, production, programming, synthesiser (tracks 4, 8)
- Jonas Quant – production (tracks 2–5, 7, 9, 12)
- Ariel Rechtshaid – engineering, production (track 6)
- Emily Rumbles – mastering engineering (track 11)
- Karianne Rundqvist – mixing engineering (tracks 1, 2, 9, 13)
- Tina Sunnero – mixing engineering (tracks 1, 2, 9, 13)
- Jack Tarrant – engineering (tracks 1–3, 10, 13)
- Ursine Vulpine – strings (tracks 1, 2, 12)

== Charts ==
Chart (2015–2016)	Peak position
Australian Albums (ARIA)	57
Austrian Albums (Ö3 Austria)	14
Belgian Albums (Ultratop Flanders)	17
Belgian Albums (Ultratop Wallonia)	39
Croatian Albums (HDU)	46
Czech Albums (ČNS IFPI)	12
Dutch Albums (Album Top 100)	30
Finnish Albums (Suomen virallinen lista)	13
German Albums (Offizielle Top 100)	8
Irish Albums (IRMA)	48
Italian Albums (FIMI)	42
Japanese Albums (Oricon)	122
Polish Albums (ZPAV)	9
Scottish Albums (Official Charts)	12
South Korean Albums (Gaon)	97
Spanish Albums (Promusicae)	55
Swedish Albums (Sverigetopplistan)	47
Swiss Albums (Schweizer Hitparade)	1
UK Albums (Official Charts)	12

== Certifications ==
Region	Certification	Certified units/sales
Poland (ZPAV)	Gold	10,000^{‡}
^{‡} Sales+streaming figures based on certification alone.
