= Desire (Hurts album) =

Studio album by Hurts
- Released: 29 September 2017
- Genre: Electropop; synth-pop; pop rock
- Length: 44:13
- Label: Sony
- Producer: Hurts

Hurts chronology
Surrender (2015)	Desire (2017)	Faith (2020)

Singles from Desire
- 1. "Beautiful Ones" Released: 21 April 2017; 2. "Ready to Go" Released: 1 September 2017; 3. "Chaperone" Released: 12 October 2017

Professional ratings
Aggregate scores
Source	Rating
Metacritic	61/100
Review scores
Source	Rating
AllMusic	3.5/5 stars
DIY	2/5 stars
The Line of Best Fit	9/10
Mojo	2/5 stars
Q	3/5 stars
Uncut	3/5 stars

Desire is the fourth studio album by English synth-pop duo Hurts. It was released on 29 September 2017 by Sony Music. The album's lead single "Beautiful Ones" was released on 21 April 2017. It was followed by the second single "Ready to Go", which was released on 1 September 2017, and "Chaperone", which was released on 12 October 2017 as the third single.

== Background ==
On 26 May 2017, Hurts announced the release of a new album called Desire through their official Facebook page. They described it as an "album full of passion, pain and lust", stating that it has some of the best music they have ever made. Hurts' frontman Theo Hutchcraft told NME to expect a "big, personal, pop album". He said: "I guess this time we tried to just make a big pop record, and it's got echoes of all three records. There are all these avenues we've gone down in the past, take a little bit from there, little bit from here. But overall we just wanted to make a big, powerful pop record and that's definitely the track we're on." Lyrically, the album is meant to revolve around the duo's personal stories, as Hutchcraft mentioned: "We've just been a bit more personal on this record. We learn how to open up and we have different experiences."

On 23 September 2017, the duo started sharing small clips of each song before the full release of the album.

== Commercial performance ==
Desire debuted at number 21 on the UK Albums Chart, selling 3,712 copies in its first week.

== Track listing ==
No.	Title	Writer(s)	Producer(s)	Length
1.	"Beautiful Ones"	Theo Hutchcraft; Adam Anderson; David Sneddon	Hurts	3:01
2.	"Ready to Go"	Hutchcraft; Anderson; Sneddon	Hurts; Lael Goldberg (additional production)	2:45
3.	"People Like Us"	Hutchcraft; Anderson; Wayne Hector		3:39
4.	"Something I Need to Know"			3:31
5.	"Thinking of You"			3:19
6.	"Wherever You Go"			3:38
7.	"Chaperone"			2:51
8.	"Boyfriend"		Hurts; Lael Goldberg	2:49
9.	"Walk Away"			3:44
10.	"Wait Up"	Hutchcraft; Anderson; Sneddon; Lael Goldberg	Hurts; Lael Goldberg	4:08
11.	"Spotlights"	Hutchcraft; Anderson; Goldberg; Chenai Zinyuku	Hurts; Lael Goldberg	3:19
12.	"Hold on to Me"	Hutchcraft; Anderson; Jamie Scott	Hurts; Daniel Bryer; Jamie Scott	3:02
13.	"Magnificent"		Hurts; Lael Goldberg (additional)	4:22
Total length:				44:13

== Personnel ==
Credits adapted from Tidal.

- Theo Hutchcraft – songwriting, production, vocals
- Adam Anderson – songwriting, production
- Lael Goldberg – songwriting, production
- David Sneddon – songwriting
- Joe Kearns – engineer
- Adam Lunn – engineer
- Matty Green – mixing engineer
- 'Hot City Horns' - Mike Davis, Paul Burton, Kenji Fenton - (all brass & woodwind)

== Charts ==
Chart (2017)	Peak position
Austrian Albums (Ö3 Austria)	24
Belgian Albums (Ultratop Flanders)	103
Belgian Albums (Ultratop Wallonia)	180
Croatian International Albums (HDU)	20
Czech Albums (ČNS IFPI)	4
Finnish Albums (Suomen virallinen lista)	6
German Albums (Offizielle Top 100)	14
Hungarian Albums (MAHASZ)	20
Latvian Albums (LaIPA)	53
Polish Albums (ZPAV)	9
Scottish Albums (OCC)	20
Spanish Albums (PROMUSICAE)	73
Swiss Albums (Schweizer Hitparade)	8
UK Albums (OCC)	21
