= Blind (Hurts song) =

Single by Hurts

from the album Exile
- A-side: "Wonderwall"
- B-side: "Silver Lining"; "Devotion"
- Released: 20 May 2013
- Recorded: 2012
- Studio: Pellerin (Gothenburg, Sweden)
- Length: 4:23
- Label: Major Label; Sony Music
- Songwriters: Hurts; Jonas Quant
- Producer: Jonas Quant

Hurts singles chronology
"Miracle" (2013)	"Blind" (2013)	"Somebody to Die For" (2013)

Music video
- "Hurts - Blind" on YouTube

"Blind" is a song by English musical duo Hurts from their second studio album Exile. The song was released as the album's second single on 10 May 2013. It was written by Hurts and Jonas Quant, and it was produced by Quant.

== Music video ==
The music video for Blind was directed by Nez Khammal who worked with the band on the studio promo video for the album Exile. Video was filming on 4 March 2013 in Frigiliana, Mollina and in Archidona in the Province of Málaga (Spain). The production team has chosen the most diverse locations, from the old quarry on the slopes of the Fort, to the streets of the old town, the church square, or some picturesque local trade. Whilst filming Theo was running and he fell from the top of the stairs all the way down and into an iron gate, he hurt his head and eye and needed stitches, after that the filming was continued.

== Track listing and formats ==
- 7" single
1. "Blind" – 4:23
2. "Blind" (director's cut; Frankie Knuckles & Eric Kupper classic mix) – 5:30
- CD single
1. "Blind" – 4:23
2. "Wonderwall" – 4:16
- Digital download
1. "Blind" – 4:23
2. "Blind" (director's cut; Frankie Knuckles & Eric Kupper classic extended mix) – 7:26
3. "Blind" (Jan Driver remix) – 4:00
4. "Wonderwall" – 4:15
5. "Blind" (video)

== Charts ==
Chart performance for "Blind"
Chart (2012)	Peak position
Austria (Ö3 Austria Top 40)	60
Germany (GfK)	52
Ukraine Airplay (TopHit)	170
