= Subbotnik Festival =

Subbotnik
- Genre: rock, pop, Indie
- Dates: First Saturday in July
- Locations: Gorky Park, Moscow, Russia
- Years active: 2013–2014
- Founders: Pop Farm
- Website: http://www.subbotnikfestival.com

Subbotnik (Russian: Субботник) was an annual international music festival, which took place in Moscow, Russia.

== Overview and history ==
Subbotnik became the first musical event of this scale ever held in the territory of Gorky Park. It was organized by the concert agency Pop Farm and corporation PMI together with Gorky Park. It was planned to become an annual event, but in was cancelled in 2015.

== Subbotnik 2013 ==
The first festival held in Gorky Park on Saturday 6 July 2013. Acts for the 2013 edition included Hurts, Foals, Jessie Ware, Savages, Motorama, Kasta, 130 по встречной на старенькой Vespa, Легендарные дефиле 76-го года. The headliner for the 2013 festival was British band Arctic Monkeys, it was the first time they played in Russia.

== SVOY Subbotnik 2014 ==
The festival held on Saturday 5 July 2014. The festival was headlined by Placebo and Kasabian.

== Lineups ==
Year	Date	Acts	Headliner
2013	6 July	Arctic Monkeys, Hurts, Foals Jessie Ware, Savages, Motorama, Kasta, 130 по встречной на старенькой Vespa, Легендарные дефиле 76-го года	Arctic Monkeys
2014	5 July	Placebo, Kasabian, Metronomy, Miles Kane, Jamie Woon, The Uchpochmack, Tesla Boy, Наадя	Placebo
