= Theo Hutchcraft =

English musician (born 1986)

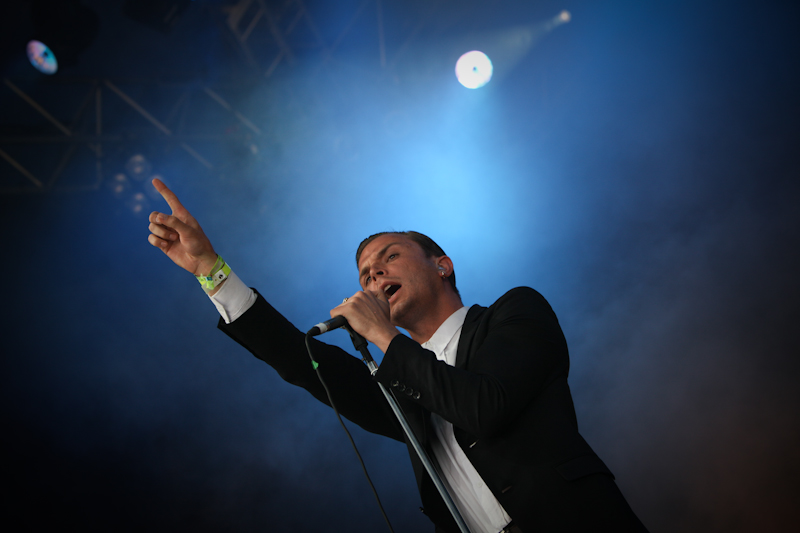
- Hutchcraft performing with Hurts in June 2010

Background information
- Born: 30 August 1986 (age 40); Richmond, North Yorkshire, England
- Genres: Synthpop; electropop; new wave; soft rock
- Occupations: Singer; songwriter
- Instrument: Vocals • guitar
- Years active: 2004–present
- Label: RCA
- Member of: Hurts

Theo David Hutchcraft (born 30 August 1986) is a British singer and songwriter. He is best known as the lead singer of the synthpop duo Hurts.

== Early life ==
Theo David Hutchcraft was born on 30 August 1986 in Richmond, North Yorkshire. He attended Richmond School in Richmond, Queen Elizabeth Sixth Form College in Darlington and the University of Salford.

== Career ==
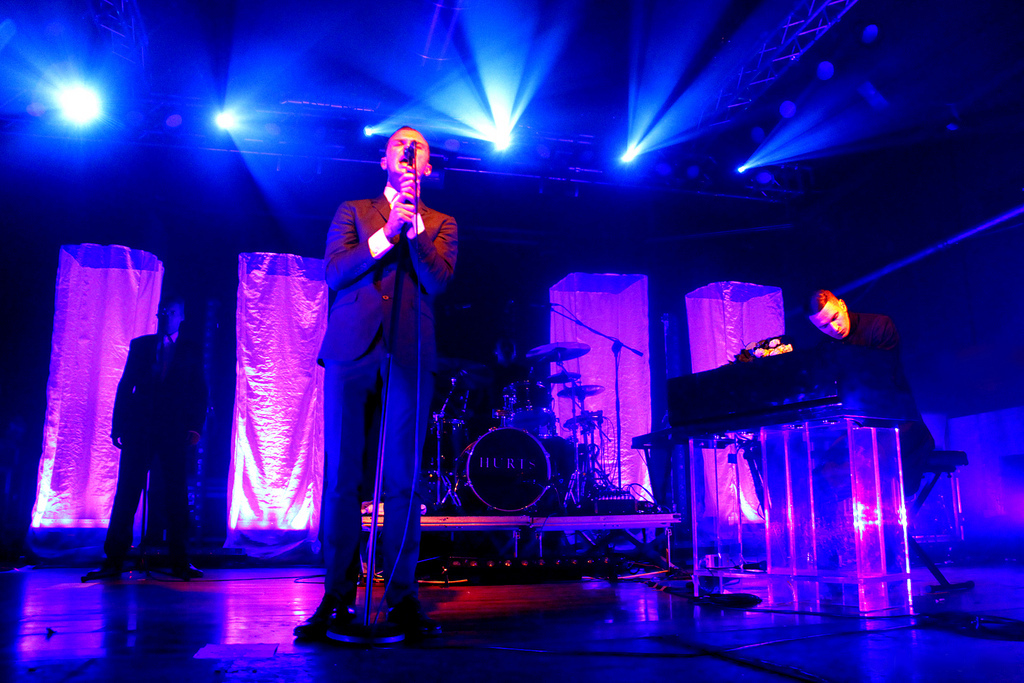
Hurts performing in October 2010

Hutchcraft met Adam Anderson and Scott Forster in Manchester in 2004. Over the next few months, they exchanged music and lyrics via email before forming the band Bureau in March 2006, along with Flick Ward and Jamie Alsop. They performed their first gig in May at The Music Box in Manchester, and were signed to independent record label High Voltage Sounds shortly afterwards. They released their first double A-side single "After Midnight / Dollhouse" in November, which was made "Single of the Week" on Xfm.

Bureau disbanded in 2007, and Hutchcraft and Anderson formed the band Daggers soon after. They signed to Label Fandango and released another double A-side single, "Money / Magazine". Despite failing to chart, the single was nominated for the Popjustice £20 Music Prize. Daggers continued to build a following throughout 2008, and worked with successful producers such as Biff Stannard and Richard X; however, after a disastrous showcase gig for record label representatives in London, Hutchcraft and Anderson returned to Manchester in September to reflect on the band's future. They recorded the mournful ballad "Unspoken" together and realised that this was the sound they wanted to develop. After informing the other members of Daggers that they would be leaving the band to continue as a duo, they went on a short break to Verona, where they claim to have been inspired by a little-known genre from the early 1990s called "disco lento".

Now called Hurts, Hutchcraft and Anderson recorded a low-budget music video for their song "Wonderful Life" with a female dancer who had responded to an advert they placed in a shop window. After they uploaded the video to their YouTube channel in April 2009, it quickly went viral, and they were signed to the RCA Records imprint Major Label three months later. The music video was remade with a bigger budget and more dancers, and this version has received over 87 million views on YouTube.

Hurts finished fourth on the BBC's "Sound of 2010" poll, and Zane Lowe premiered their song "Blood, Tears & Gold" as his "Hottest Record in the World" soon after. They performed their first gig on 22 January at the Michalsky Stylenite in Berlin, followed by a gig on 22 February at St Phillips Church in Salford, where they performed eight songs. This was quickly followed by gigs at Wiltons Music Hall in London, and more gigs in Berlin and Cologne. Following an unexpected surge in popularity after their music was played on radio stations in Greece, they were invited to perform at the MAD Video Music Awards in Athens in June. That same month, it was announced that the duo would release a song featuring vocals from Kylie Minogue. The song, "Devotion", was later included on the band's debut album. Hurts recorded a performance of Minogue's 1994 hit "Confide in Me" for the website of British tabloid The Sun, and the song has since been regularly performed during their concerts. Minogue later covered "Wonderful Life" during a BBC Radio 1 Live Lounge appearance.

Hurts' debut album Happiness was released in September 2010, reaching the top 10 in 12 European countries and selling over 1 million copies worldwide. They also sold more than 1 million singles worldwide. Happiness debuted at No. 4 on the UK Albums Chart, selling 25,000 copies in its first week on sale, making it the fastest-selling debut album by a band in 2010. They have since released four more albums, all of which received positive reviews: Exile (2013), Surrender (2015), Desire (2017), and Faith (2020).

Hutchcraft co-wrote the songs "Saturdays", "Silver Tongues", and "She Is Beauty We Are World Class" for Louis Tomlinson's 2022 album Faith in the Future.

Hutchcraft contributed to Måneskin’s single “Valentine” as one of the songwriters, co-writing the track alongside the band and other credited authors.

== Discography ==
=== With Hurts ===
- Happiness (2010)
- Exile (2013)
- Surrender (2015)
- Desire (2017)
- Faith (2020)

=== Other songwriting credits ===
- "Save Disco" by Pnau (2017)
- "By Your Side" by Calvin Harris and Tom Grennan (2021)
- "Saturdays" by Louis Tomlinson (2022)
- "Silver Tongues" by Louis Tomlinson (2022)
- "She Is Beauty We Are World Class" by Louis Tomlinson (2022)
- "Valentine" by Måneskin (2023)
- "Happier" by Omar Rudberg (2023)
- "Free" by Calvin Harris and Ellie Goulding (2024)
- "Lemonade" by Louis Tomlinson (2025)
