= Miracle (Hurts song) =

Single by Hurts

from the album Exile
- Released: 11 January 2013
- Recorded: 2012
- Studio: Pellerin (Gothenburg, Sweden)
- Length: 3:45
- Label: Major Label; Sony; RCA
- Songwriter: Hurts
- Producer: Hurts

Hurts singles chronology
"Blood, Tears & Gold" (2011)	"Miracle" (2013)	"Blind" (2013)

Alternative single cover
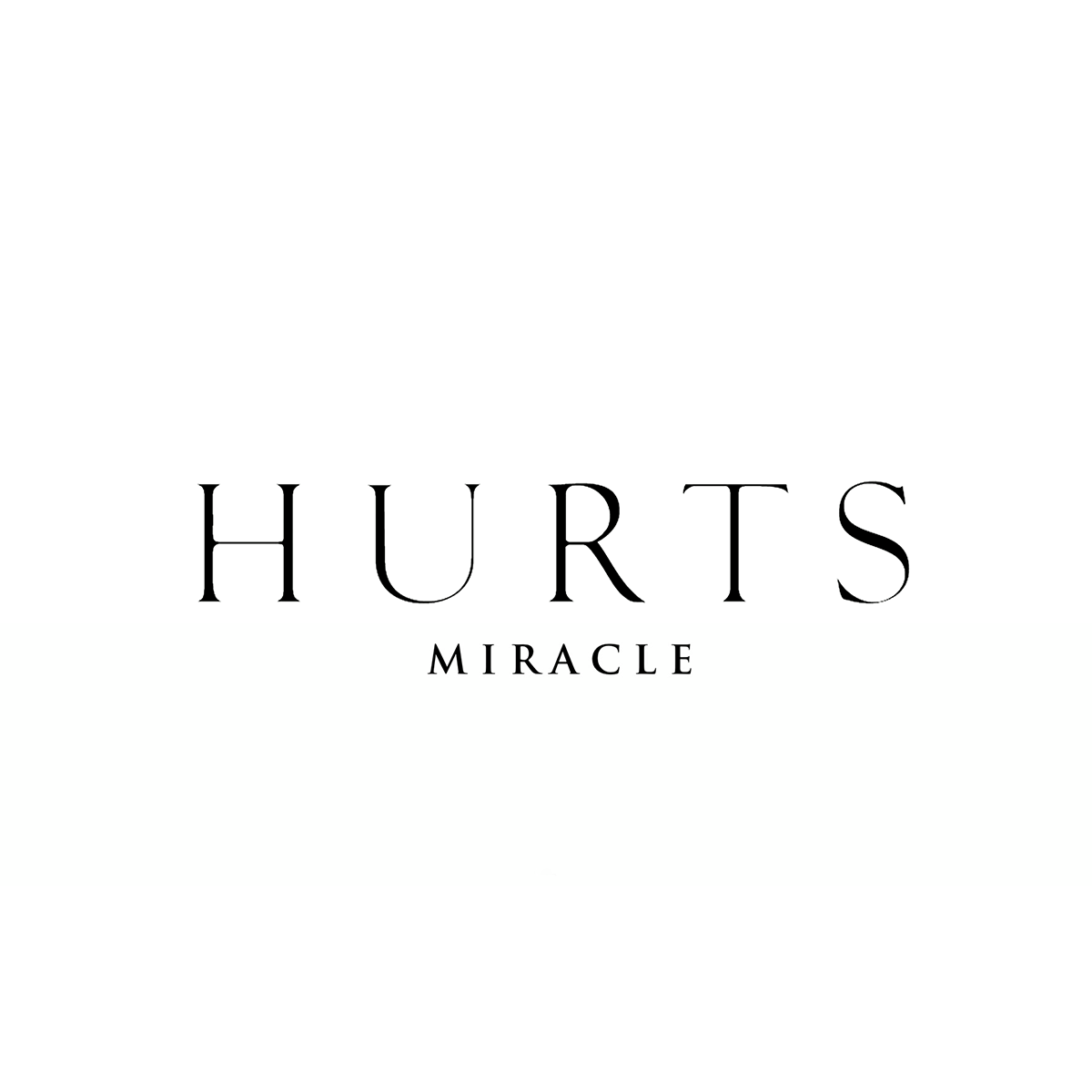

Music video
- "Hurts - Miracle" on YouTube

"Miracle" is the lead single by British duo Hurts taken off their second studio album Exile, which was released on 10 March 2013, exactly a day before the album release. The song premiered on BBC Radio 1 on 4 January 2013. In Germany, the "Robots Don't Sleep Remix" was released instead. A remix EP was released on 1 March.

== Music video ==
Two versions of the music video exist. The first video was filmed in Colindale (London). The video was released on 4 February 2013.

Black colour dominates the video. Black marries the band's widescreen synthpop with this dark and dramatic journey through a post-apocalyptic shopping centre, peppered with religious imagery and fearless half-clad dancers, ending on a rooftop with the Hurts hashtag-like logo in flames. This version of the video was leaked and then deleted. The official music video was posted on Hurts official Vevo account on 28 February, giving a very different concept from the first version released.

First version was directed by Chris Turner and the second one by Frank Borin.

== Live performances ==
Hurts performed the single live at The Jonathan Ross Show on 9 February 2013, which was their first performance of the song on a television programme.

== Track listing and formats ==
- iTunes single
1. "Miracle" – 3:44
- Miracle (Robots Don't Sleep Remix) – iTunes single
1. "Miracle" (Robots Don't Sleep Remix) – 3:41
- Miracle (Remixes) – iTunes EP
1. "Miracle" – 3:44
2. "Miracle" (Burns 50Hz Version) – 4:47
3. "Miracle" (Breakage's an Inferior Titles Moment Remix) – 5:06
4. "Miracle" (Russ Chimes Remix) – 4:32
5. "Miracle" (Atatika's 'Miraculous' Remix) – 5:44
- Miracle (UK Remixes) – iTunes EP
1. "Miracle" – 3:44
2. "Miracle" (Burns 50Hz Version) – 4:47
3. "Miracle" (Breakage's an Inferior Titles Moment Remix) – 5:06
4. "Miracle" (Russ Chimes Remix) – 4:32
5. "Miracle" (Kill FM Remix) – 5:11
6. "Miracle" (Atatika's 'Miraculous' Remix) – 5:44

== Personnel ==
- Hurts — keyboards, lyrics, music, programming, production, singer
- Pete Watson – piano, bass guitar
- Paul Walsham – drums
- Wil Malone – conductor, performance arranger
- Dan Grech-Marguerat – engineer, producer
- John Barclay, Tom Rees-Roberts – trumpet
- Duncan Fuller – assistant engineer
- Laurence Davis, Richard Watkins, Simon Rayner – horn
- Andy Wood, Richard Edwards – trombone
- Jakob Hermann – engineer, guitar
- Spike Stent – mixing engineer
- David Emery – assistant engineer
- Ted Jensen – mastering engineer

== Charts ==
Chart (2013)	Peak position
Austria (Ö3 Austria Top 40)	43
Belgium (Ultratip Bubbling Under Flanders)	6
Germany (GfK)	23
Hungary (Rádiós Top 40)	19
Switzerland (Schweizer Hitparade)	27
UK Singles (Official Charts Company)	120
