= Exile (Hurts album) =

Studio album by Hurts
- Released: 8 March 2013
- Recorded: January–June 2012
- Studio: Pellerin (Gothenburg, Sweden)
- Length: 50:49
- Label: Major Label
- Producer: Dan Grech-Marguerat; Hurts; Jonas Quant

Hurts chronology
Happiness (2010)	Exile (2013)	Surrender (2015)

Singles from Exile
- 1. "Miracle" Released: 11 January 2013; 2. "Blind" Released: 10 May 2013; 3. "Somebody to Die For" Released: 21 July 2013

Exile is the second studio album by English synth-pop duo Hurts. It was released on 8 March 2013 by Major Label. The album was produced by Hurts, along with Jonas Quant—with whom the duo worked on their debut album, Happiness (2010)—and Dan Grech-Marguerat. "Miracle" was released on 11 January 2013 as the lead single from the album, followed by "Blind" on 10 May 2013 and "Somebody to Die For" on 21 July 2013. Upon release, Exile debuted at number nine on the UK Albums Chart, while charting inside the top 10 in eight other countries.

== Background ==
The album's title was revealed in December 2012, followed by the track listing and artwork in January and February 2013, respectively. Hurts singer Theo Hutchcraft came up with the title while sitting in a bar in Osaka; he glimpsed it on a scrolling billboard, and it was the only word he could understand. "That sense of being in a weird place. Freedom, fear, isolation, joy, religion, punishment, the decadence that comes with exile—always being on tour, always far away from home. It did feel like we were on the run, always chasing something".

Hutchcraft read Cormac McCarthy's 2006 apocalyptic novel The Road three times while writing the album, which was recorded from January to June 2012. Speaking to NME about Exile, he said: "We had to push ourselves and express the more intense, darker side which lies at the heart of our music. The first record was mainly about love and loss. This is a record about sex and death. The whole process was one of the heaviest and most extreme experiences we've had, but now we're on the outside looking in, it feels like we've made something truly unique and special."

== Composition ==
Compared to Hurts' debut album, Happiness, Exile incorporates more orchestral and rock instrumentation, while retaining the duo's core new wave and krautrock influences. According to Matt Collar of AllMusic, the album "updat[es] their '80s electronic sound with a sparkling, contemporary R&B sheen that weaves in Baroque orchestral sections, choirs of backing vocals, and even some swaggering hard rock guitar attitude." The album's lyrical themes include sadism, sickness, possessiveness and envy.

The album's second track, "Miracle", employs an anthemic chorus and a Depeche Mode-esque backdrop of stadium guitars and synths. Adam Anderson described it as the most effortless song the duo have ever done, and compared writing it to the creation of "Stay" from Happiness. Critics compared "Miracle" to Nine Inch Nails, as well as Coldplay's songs "Paradise" and "Princess of China".

"Sandman" has an R&B feel to it; according to Hutchcraft, the duo aimed to "make a song that sounded like Hudson Mohawke, but as a pop song." The song was described as "a mechanical krautrocky dirge with a pop heart", while its child choir was branded "creepy" and "cloying" by critics.

Inspired by Cormac McCarthy's 2006 apocalyptic novel of the same name and J. G. Ballard's 1973 novel Crash, "The Road" is about a car accident. "We tried to write the darkest song we could", says Hutchcraft. "We thought 'How bleak can we make it?'" He explained, "We wanted people to hear 'The Road' first because it's the most extreme example of the idea on the record."

To record "Help", the duo enlisted a choir made up of fans from around the world. "They were all brilliant", Hutchcraft said. "It was such a powerful thing, watching them. So emotional. To hear a mass of people singing 'I just need some help'. It was heartbreaking."

== Release and promotion ==
Promotion for Exile started with a two-minute mini-promo for "The Road" directed by Nez Khammal, which was unveiled on 14 December 2012. Conceptually, the video takes the viewer on a journey of the life of Hurts members Hutchcraft and Anderson.

Following its premiere on BBC Radio 1 as Zane Lowe's "Hottest Record in the World" on 12 February 2013, the song "Sandman" was made available as a free download from Hurts' official website. The duo performed a cover of Bruno Mars' "Locked Out of Heaven" along with "Miracle" and "Exile" in a live session at BBC Radio 1's Maida Vale Studios for Zane Lowe on 13 February 2013.

In February 2013, Hurts performed a NME Awards show at London's Heaven and a gig at Berlin's Postbahnhof, before embarking on a 12-date European headline tour, which commenced in Cologne on 14 March and ended in Glasgow on 2 April. The second leg of the tour started on 25 October 2013, visiting countries such as the UK, Denmark, Norway, Sweden, Estonia, Czech Republic, Germany and Luxembourg.

=== Singles ===
The album's lead single, "Miracle", received its first worldwide radio play on Huw Stephens' BBC Radio 1 breakfast show on 4 January 2013. The song was released digitally in several continental European countries on 11 January 2013 and in the United Kingdom on 10 March 2013. Hurts performed "Miracle" on Dermot O'Leary's BBC Radio 2 show on 9 March 2013, alongside a cover version of "Wonderwall" by Oasis.

"Blind" was released as the album's second single on 10 May 2013. The duo premiered the track during a live session at Absolute Radio. The accompanying video was shot on location in Spain and debuted on 4 April 2013.

"Somebody to Die For" was released on 19 July 2013 as the third single from the album. The duo premiered the track during a special live session at Spotify in January 2013.

== Critical reception ==
Professional ratings
Aggregate scores
Source	Rating
Metacritic	59/100
Review scores
Source	Rating
AllMusic	4.5/5 stars
Clash	4/10
The Guardian	3/5 stars
The Independent	4/5 stars
musicOMH	3/5 stars
NME	7/10
The Observer	2/5 stars
PopMatters	5/10
This Is Fake DIY	7/10
Time Out London	2/5 stars

Exile received mixed reviews from music critics. At Metacritic, which assigns a weighted mean rating out of 100 to reviews from mainstream critics, the album received an average score of 59, based on 16 reviews, which indicates "mixed or average reviews". Simon Price of The Independent wrote that "Exile employs greater variety than Happiness, from acoustic piano to—shock—what sounds like electric guitar, but without sacrificing any of the grandeur. It's often reminiscent of Soft Cell or late 1980s Depeche Mode. It's on close personal terms with magnificence." AllMusic editor Matt Collar viewed the album as a "bigger, brasher, even more passionate version of the cinematic feel heard on Happiness", adding that "[w]hat's clear about Hurts on Exile is how skilled Hutchcraft and Anderson are at seamlessly incorporating their influences, so you can hear the bands' inspirations in every line even as you marvel that this album is like nothing you've heard before." Dan Martin of NME compared Exile to Muse's album The 2nd Law and stated that, "by hooking their comeback on Exile's lead single 'Miracle', [Hurts] reminded everyone just how bloody fantastic they were at writing anthemic songs." Gareth Ware of This Is Fake DIY expressed that the album "cements [the duo's] place as mainstream pop's most daring and ambitious offering. While the relentless realisation of their film-ready stylings may not be to everyone's tastes, the fact they're here at all in the first place is a cause worth celebrating in itself."

The Guardian's Caroline Sullivan commented that "though the duo now incorporate spasms of grotty, Nine Inch Nailsy guitar [...], Exile is still defined by its synth-pop froideur", noting that Hurts have "a gift for striding, anthemic choruses that turn even the most overwrought songs into unshakeable earworms." Chris Saunders of musicOMH complimented Hurts for "making stadium sized pop music with a darker underbelly, without forcing it, in the same black vein as Depeche Mode", while remarking, "Exile isn't a bad album, and Hurts do what they do well [...] Yet Exile is found wanting when they try too much to be the stadium band rather than allowing the drama to play out." Tom Hocknell of BBC Music opined that, although Exile "occasionally takes itself so seriously that it's hard not to smirk", the album "genuinely builds upon its predecessor" and "reinforces the feeling in modern pop that no other group sounds quite as hurt as Hurts." The Observer's Hermione Hoby faulted the album for lacking a "killer single" and wrote, "It's all laid on thick—the violins, the choir-sung, stadium-friendly choruses—but the songwriting isn't sturdy enough to hold it all up." In a review for PopMatters, Maria Schurr characterised the duo as "style over substance" and found that musically, the album is "rarely memorable enough". Schurr continued, "No matter how many dark subjects are nested throughout, too often the music on Exile falls back into the same old tricks of bells-and-whistles pop choruses and obvious hooks." Time Out London's Oliver Keens felt that the album's "poppy moments have become as lazy and humdrum as 'Sandman'", concluding that "too often the desire to directly rival Muse or U2 makes [Hurts] sound lost and featherweight in comparison." John Freeman of Clash stated the album "starts brightly", but critiqued that tracks like "Blind", "Sandman" and "The Rope" "[reduce] Exile to a chilling example of naked ambition prioritising production style over songwriting substance."

== Commercial performance ==
Exile debuted at number nine on the UK Albums Chart, selling 12,124 copies in its first week.

== Track listing ==
All tracks are written by Hurts, except where noted.

No.	Title	Writer(s)	Producer(s)	Length
1.	"Exile"	Hurts, Jonas Quant	Hurts; Quant	4:17
2.	"Miracle"		Hurts; Dan Grech-Marguerat	3:44
3.	"Sandman"	Hurts, Quant	Hurts; Quant	3:54
4.	"Blind"	Hurts, Quant	Quant	4:23
5.	"Only You"		Hurts; Quant	4:29
6.	"The Road"		Hurts	4:35
7.	"Cupid"	Hurts, Quant	Quant	2:42
8.	"Mercy"		Hurts; Quant	4:06
9.	"The Crow"		Hurts	5:33
10.	"Somebody to Die For"		Hurts; Grech-Marguerat	4:35
11.	"The Rope"	Hurts, Quant	Quant	4:14
12.	"Help"		Hurts; Grech-Marguerat	4:17
Total length:				50:49

Deluxe edition bonus tracks
No.	Title	Producer(s)	Length
13.	"Heaven"	Hurts; Quant; Grech-Marguerat	4:04
14.	"Guilt"	Hurts	2:55
Total length:			57:48

Deluxe edition bonus DVD
No.	Title	Length
1.	"Россия"	31:04

Japanese edition bonus track
No.	Title	{{{extra_column}}}	Length
15.	"Miracle" (Burns 50Hz Version)	Hurts	4:47

== Personnel ==
Credits adapted from the liner notes of the deluxe edition of Exile.

=== Hurts ===
- Hurts – programming (all tracks); production (tracks 1–3, 5, 6, 8–10, 12–14); instruments (tracks 1, 3, 4, 6, 7, 9, 10, 14); keyboards (tracks 2, 5, 8, 11–13); guitar (track 11); mixing (track 14)
- Adam Anderson – art direction
- Theo Hutchcraft – vocals, art direction

=== Additional personnel ===
- Malin Abrahamsson – choir vocals (tracks 8, 11)
- John Barclay – trumpet (tracks 2, 12)
- Dick Beetham – mastering (tracks 6, 13, 14)
- Mark Berrow – violin (tracks 10, 12, 13)
- Rachel Stephanie Bolt – viola (tracks 10, 12, 13)
- Emil Chakalov – violin (tracks 10, 12, 13)
- Dermot Crehan – violin (tracks 10, 12, 13)
- Caroline Dale – cello (tracks 10, 12, 13)
- Dave Daniels – cello (tracks 10, 12, 13)
- Laurence Davies – horn (tracks 2, 4, 12)
- Liz Edwards – violin (tracks 10, 12, 13)
- Richard Edwards – trombone (tracks 2, 4, 12)
- David Emery – assistant engineering (tracks 1–5, 7–12)
- Martin Forslund – assistant engineering (tracks 5, 8, 11)
- Duncan Fuller – assistant engineering (tracks 2, 6, 9, 10, 12, 13)
- Karolin Funke – choir vocals (tracks 8, 11)
- Jennifer Götvall – choir vocals (tracks 8, 11)
- Dan Grech-Marguerat – production (tracks 2, 9, 10, 12, 13); engineering (tracks 2, 6, 9, 10, 12, 13), engineering (tracks 4, 6); mixing (track 6)
- Peter Hanson – violin (tracks 10, 12, 13)
- Jakob Hermann – engineering (tracks 1–5, 7–8, 10, 11); drums (tracks 5, 8, 11)
- The Hurts Choir – additional vocals (track 12)
- Garfield Jackson – viola (tracks 10, 12, 13)
- Ted Jensen – mastering (tracks 1–5, 7–12)
- Elton John – piano (track 12)
- Salome Kent – strings, vocals (track 11)
- Patrick Kiernan – violin (tracks 10, 12, 13)
- Boguslaw Kostecki – violin (tracks 10, 12, 13)
- Julian Leaper – violin (tracks 10, 12, 13)
- Gaby Lester – violin (tracks 10, 12, 13)
- Anthony Lewis – cello (tracks 10, 12, 13)
- Martin Loveday – cello (tracks 10, 12, 13)
- Steve Mair – bass (tracks 10, 12, 13)
- Wil Malone – brass arrangement, brass conductor (tracks 2, 4); trumpet (track 4); string arrangement, string conductor (tracks 10, 12, 13)
- Rita Manning – violin (tracks 10, 12, 13)
- Charl Marais – photography
- Perry Montague-Mason – violin (tracks 10, 12, 13)
- Andy Parker – viola (tracks 10, 12, 13)
- Jonas Quant – instruments (tracks 1, 3, 4, 7); production, programming (tracks 1, 3–5, 7, 8, 11, 13); keyboards (tracks 5, 8, 11, 13); guitar (track 11); mixing (track 13)
- Tom Pigott-Smith – violin (tracks 10, 12, 13)
- Anthony Pleeth – cello (tracks 10, 12, 13)
- Maciej Rakowski – violin (tracks 10, 12, 13)
- Simon Rayner – horn (tracks 2, 4, 12)
- Jonathan Rees – violin (tracks 10, 12, 13)
- Tom Rees-Roberts – trumpet (tracks 2, 4, 12)
- Frank Schaefer – cello (tracks 10, 12, 13)
- Nathalie Schmeikal – backing vocals (track 4)
- Mary Scully – bass (tracks 10, 12, 13)
- Shilling & Shilling – design
- Emlyn Singleton – violin (tracks 10, 12, 13)
- Oskar Stenmark – bass guitar, trombone, trumpet (track 8)
- Per Stenbeck – bass guitar (track 11)
- Spike Stent – mixing (tracks 1–4, 7–12)
- Tina Sunnero – choir vocals (tracks 8, 11)
- Cathy Thompson – violin (tracks 10, 12, 13)
- Chris Tombling – violin (tracks 10, 12, 13)
- Allen Walley – bass (tracks 10, 12, 13)
- Paul Walsham – drums (tracks 2, 9, 10, 12, 13)
- Vicci Wardman – viola (tracks 10, 12, 13)
- Richard Watkins – horn (tracks 2, 4, 12)
- Pete Watson – bass guitar (track 2); piano (tracks 2, 10, 12, 13); performer (track 6)
- Bruce White – viola (tracks 10, 12, 13)
- Andy Wood – trombone (tracks 2, 4, 12)
- Steve Wright – viola (tracks 10, 12, 13)
- Warren Zielinski – violin (tracks 10, 12, 13)

== Charts ==
=== Weekly charts ===
Chart (2013)	Peak position
Australian Albums (ARIA)	90
Austrian Albums (Ö3 Austria)	4
Belgian Albums (Ultratop Flanders)	24
Belgian Albums (Ultratop Wallonia)	29
Croatian Albums (HDU)	18
Czech Albums (ČNS IFPI)	7
Danish Albums (Hitlisten)	31
Dutch Albums (Album Top 100)	20
Estonian Albums (Raadio 2)	5
Finnish Albums (Suomen virallinen lista)	2
French Albums (SNEP)	183
German Albums (Offizielle Top 100)	3
Greek Albums (IFPI)	26
Hungarian Albums (MAHASZ)	5
Irish Albums (IRMA)	34
Italian Albums (FIMI)	34
Japanese Albums (Oricon	105
Polish Albums (ZPAV)	3
Scottish Albums (OCC)	13
Slovenian Albums (Val 202)	15
South Korean Albums (Gaon)	60
Spanish Albums (PROMUSICAE)	25
Swedish Albums (Sverigetopplistan)	17
Swiss Albums (Schweizer Hitparade)	2
UK Albums (OCC)	9

=== Year-end charts ===
Chart (2013)	Position
German Albums (Offizielle Top 100)	96
Swiss Albums (Schweizer Hitparade)	63

== Certifications ==
Region	Certification	Certified units/sales
Germany (BVMI)	Gold	100,000^{^}
Poland (ZPAV)	Gold	10,000^{*}
Switzerland (IFPI Switzerland)	Gold	10,000^{^}
^{*} Sales figures based on certification alone.^{^} Shipments figures based on certification alone.

== Release history ==
Region	Date	Format	Edition	Label	Ref(s)
Australia	8 March 2013	CD; digital download	Standard; deluxe	Sony	
Germany	8 March 2013	CD; CD + DVD; LP; digital download	Standard; deluxe	Sony	
Sweden	8 March 2013	CD; CD + DVD; LP; digital download	Standard; deluxe	Sony	
Ireland	8 March 2013	CD; CD + DVD; digital download	Standard; deluxe	Major Label	
United Kingdom	11 March 2013	CD; CD + DVD; LP; digital download	Standard; deluxe	Major Label	
Poland	12 March 2013	CD; CD + DVD; LP; digital download	Standard; deluxe	Sony	
Italy	12 March 2013	CD; CD + DVD; digital download	Standard; deluxe	Sony	
Japan	13 March 2013	CD; digital download	Standard	Sony	
